= List of Turkish tornadoes in 2026 =

List of tornadoes in Turkey and surrounding regions in 2026

Turkish tornadoes of 2026
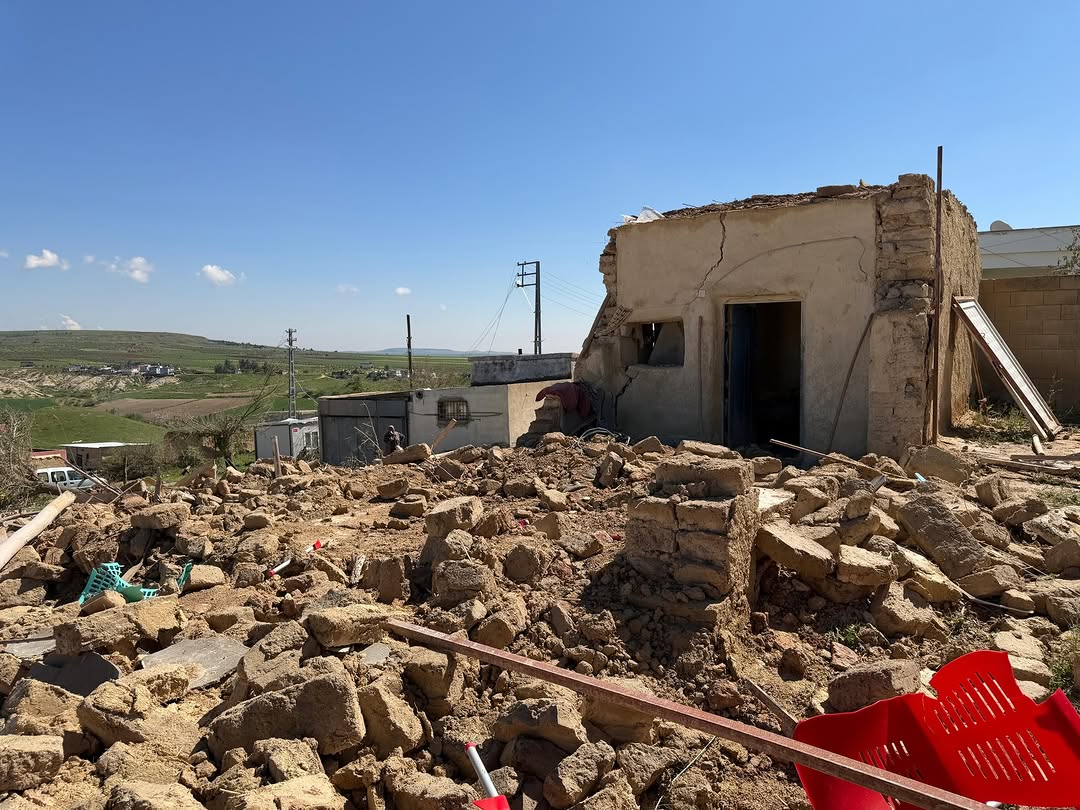
- Damage produced by the IF4 Akçamezra-Kayacık, Turkey tornado on 3 May.
- Timespan: 4 January - Present
- Maximum rated tornado: IF4 tornado: Akçamezra, Turkey on 3 May
- Tornadoes: 133
- Fatalities: 4 (26 injuries)

The 2026 Turkish tornado season is the current season of tornadoes and tornado outbreaks across Turkey in 2026. As of November, there have been 133 confirmed tornadoes across several cities, resulting in 4 fatalities and at least 26 injuries.

IFU	IF0	IF0.5	IF1	IF1.5	IF2	IF2.5	IF3	IF4	IF5	Total
82	3	8	15	9	12	1	2	1	0	133

Many different meteorological organizations across Turkey document tornado events, often using different tornado intensity scales, including the Fujita (F) scale, the Enhanced Fujita (EF) scale, and the International Fujita (IF) scale. For consistency, this list primarily uses the IF-scale, the preferred scale of the European Severe Storms Laboratory (ESSL) and its database, the European Severe Weather Database (ESWD).

== Climatology ==
To be expanded

== Season summary ==
- Note: Unrated tornadoes are counted as IFU on the graphs

== January ==
IFU	IF0	IF0.5	IF1	IF1.5	IF2	IF2.5	IF3	IF4	IF5	Total
2	0	2	4	3	2	0	0	0	0	13

=== 8 January event ===
List of confirmed tornadoes – Thursday, 8 January 2026 (Note: All dates are based on the local time zone where the tornado touched down; however, all times are in Coordinated Universal Time for consistency.)
IF#	Location	Region	Country	Start coord.	Time (UTC)	Path length	Max. width
IF2	Kızılağaç to Karacalar to Sülek	Antalya	Turkey	36.7482°N 31.5517°E	16:35	Unknown	Unknown
IF2	This strong tornado struck three villages and caused significant damage. The roofs to approximately six buildings were heavily damaged, multiple barns suffered wall collapses, numerous greenhouses were destroyed, and several trees were snapped or uprooted. A parked Fiat car was tossed 4 metres (4.4 yd) and overturned, injuring its occupant.						

=== 26 January event ===
List of confirmed tornadoes – Monday, 26 January 2026
IF#	Location	Region	Country	Start coord.	Time (UTC)	Path length	Max. width
IF1.5	Sarıbelen	Antalya	Turkey	36.2662°N 29.49°E	16:35	Unknown	Unknown
IF1.5	This tornado heavily impacted rural farmland, where numerous greenhouses were torn apart or collapsed and large sections of crops were destroyed. As it tracked onward, several homes and buildings sustained roof damage, windows were shattered, and power transmission lines were brought down. The tornado continued damaging farm equipment up until it dissipated.						
IF1	Finike area	Antalya	Turkey	36.3444°N 30.1636°E	17:35	Unknown	Unknown
IF1	A waterspout formed offshore near Saklısu before making landfall and impacting a multi-story residential building, shattering balcony railing windows. It traveled inland where it caused significant damage to agricultural areas by destroying multiple greenhouses. As it continued along its path, the tornado broke energy transmission lines, leading to power outages across the area, before it ultimately dissipated.						
IF1	Mavikent	Antalya	Turkey	36.3145°N 30.3478°E	18:00	Unknown	Unknown
IF1	A tornado developed and moved through agricultural areas, where it caused significant damage to multiple greenhouses, tearing apart structures and destroying crops grown inside. As it continued along its path, energy transmission lines were damaged. Additional structural damage occurred as parts of a building's roof were torn off. The tornado continued over farmland before lifting.						
IF2	Aksu	Antalya	Turkey	36.8804°N 30.9371°E	19:15	Unknown	Unknown
IF2	This strong tornado began in Aksu and moved through coastal areas, where it caused severe damage by tearing boats from their moorings, overturning and smashing many of them along the shoreline and riverbanks. As it continued inland, the tornado damaged or destroyed piers and nearby structures while also blowing down trees, traffic signs, and streetlights, leaving debris scattered across the area. Agricultural zones were heavily impacted as well, with numerous greenhouses torn apart and crops destroyed, while additional structural damage included roofs being ripped off buildings and windows shattered. The tornado continued to move further inland where it eventually dissipated over fields. One person was injured.						
IF1	Çolaklı	Antalya	Turkey	36.8373°N 31.3176°E	20:20	Unknown	Unknown
IF1	This tornado damaged several houses and uprooted numerous trees.						
IF1.5	Denizyaka to Büklüce	Antalya	Turkey	36.8591°N 31.1841°E	20:25	Unknown	Unknown
IF1.5	A tornado moved through Denizyaka and Büklüce, where it caused concentrated damage by uprooting and snapping numerous trees and severely impacting structures. A mosque minaret collapsed and fell onto a nearby structure while surrounding buildings also sustained notable damage. The tornado continued through the semi-rural area leaving widespread tree damage and structural impacts before dissipating.						

=== 27 January event ===
List of confirmed tornadoes – Tuesday, 27 January 2026
IF#	Location	Region	Country	Start coord.	Time (UTC)	Path length	Max. width
IF1	SE of Karadere	Antalya	Turkey	36.326°N 29.2855°E	04:05	0.7 km (0.43 mi)	30 m (33 yd)
IF1	This tornado damaged and destroyed numerous greenhouses and uprooted several trees.						
IF0.5	Zırlankaya	Antalya	Turkey	37.0213°N 31.0231°E	08:55	Unknown	Unknown
IF0.5	A weak tornado damaged greenhouses and lofted light debris.						
IFU	Akgöl	Mersin	Turkey	36.2900°N 33.9600°E	13:50	Unknown	Unknown
IFU	A short lived watersprout.						
IF0.5	Arkum	Mersin	Turkey	36.3503°N 34.0569°E	14:10	Unknown	Unknown
IF0.5	A large greenhouse was damaged.						

=== 30 January event ===
List of confirmed tornadoes – Friday, 30 January 2026
IF#	Location	Region	Country	Start coord.	Time (UTC)	Path length	Max. width
IFU	E of Adana	Adana	Turkey	36.9919°N 35.4399°E	12:00	Unknown	Unknown
IFU	A tornado was observed but caused no damage.						

=== 31 January event ===
List of confirmed tornadoes – Saturday, 31 January 2026
IF#	Location	Region	Country	Start coord.	Time (UTC)	Path length	Max. width
IF1.5	Ahatlar	Aydın	Turkey	37.9892°N 28.1004°E	11:40	Unknown	Unknown
IF1.5	A tornado impacted several rural neighborhoods in the Köşk district, initially causing widespread roof damage as strong winds tore sections of roofing from many homes and broke branches from olive trees across agricultural areas. As it moved through more elevated areas, the damage intensified, with numerous houses having roofs completely blown away, some walls collapsing, and metal roofing structures lifted and thrown into nearby fields, while balcony railings were bent and twisted by the force of the winds. A mosque minaret was also damaged, and additional structural impacts were observed across homes and buildings, with debris scattered throughout the affected areas as the tornado lifted.						

== February ==
IFU	IF0	IF0.5	IF1	IF1.5	IF2	IF2.5	IF3	IF4	IF5	Total
1	1	2	0	0	0	0	0	0	0	4

=== 6 February event ===
List of confirmed tornadoes – Friday, 6 February 2026
IF#	Location	Region	Country	Start coord.	Time (UTC)	Path length	Max. width
IF0.5	Beykonak	Antalya	Turkey	36.3393°N 30.31°E	01:40	Unknown	Unknown
IF0.5	This weak tornado caused damage to multiple greenhouses.						

=== 12 February event ===
List of confirmed tornadoes – Thursday, 12 February 2026
IF#	Location	Region	Country	Start coord.	Time (UTC)	Path length	Max. width
IF0	Narince	Mersin	Turkey	36.1482°N 32.9358°E	15:30	Unknown	Unknown
IF0	A weak tornado damaged greenhouse covers.						

=== 17 February event ===
List of confirmed tornadoes – Tuesday, 17 February 2026
IF#	Location	Region	Country	Start coord.	Time (UTC)	Path length	Max. width
IFU	Karaisalı	Adana	Turkey	37.2571°N 35.0586°E	17:00	Unknown	Unknown
IFU	A tornado was recorded causing no damage.						

=== 18 February event ===
List of confirmed tornadoes – Wednesday, 18 February 2026
IF#	Location	Region	Country	Start coord.	Time (UTC)	Path length	Max. width
IF0.5	Avsallar	Antalya	Turkey	36.6244°N 31.7582°E	00:30	Unknown	Unknown
IF0.5	A waterspout made landfall in Avsallar, damaging metal structures and uprooting trees.						

== March ==
IFU	IF0	IF0.5	IF1	IF1.5	IF2	IF2.5	IF3	IF4	IF5	Total
?	?	?	?	?	?	0	0	0	0	?

=== 20 March event ===
List of confirmed tornadoes – Friday, 20 March 2026
IF#	Location	Region	Country	Start coord.	Time (UTC)	Path length	Max. width
IF0.5	Arkum	Mersin	Turkey	36.3678°N 34.0531°E	22:30	Unknown	Unknown
IF0.5	This tornado damaged multiple greenhouses.						

=== 28 March event ===
List of confirmed tornadoes – Saturday, 28 March 2026
IF#	Location	Region	Country	Start coord.	Time (UTC)	Path length	Max. width
IF1	NE of Kumluca	Antalya	Turkey	36.3788°N 30.3229°E	23:40	Unknown	Unknown
IF1	This tornado struck Sarıkavak, collapsing greenhouses and lifting greenhouse covers.						

== April ==
IFU	IF0	IF0.5	IF1	IF1.5	IF2	IF2.5	IF3	IF4	IF5	Total
4	0	0	1	1	0	0	0	0	0	6

- One tornado has been confirmed but has not yet been rated.

=== 3 April event ===
List of confirmed tornadoes – Friday, 3 April 2026
IF#	Location	Region	Country	Start coord.	Time (UTC)	Path length	Max. width
IFU	Kızıltepe area	Mardin	Turkey	37.1914°N 40.5849°E	16:00	Unknown	Unknown
IFU	A tornado was observed but caused no damage.						

=== 5 April event ===
List of confirmed tornadoes – Sunday, 5 April 2026
IF#	Location	Region	Country	Start coord.	Time (UTC)	Path length	Max. width
IFU	E of Adana	Adana	Turkey	37.0106°N 35.4961°E	13:25	Unknown	Unknown
IFU	Landspout tornado was observed. No known damage.						
IFU	Akkuyu	Adana	Turkey	36.2662°N 29.49°E	14:00	Unknown	Unknown
IFU	Tornado was reported. Ground contact likely.						

=== 6 April event ===
List of confirmed tornadoes – Monday, 6 April 2026
IF#	Location	Region	Country	Start coord.	Time (UTC)	Path length	Max. width
IFU	Soysallı area	Adana	Turkey	37.1444°N 35.6653°E	13:00	Unknown	Unknown
IFU	This tornado was photographed over a field, causing no damage.						

=== 7 April event ===
List of confirmed tornadoes – Tuesday, 7 April 2026
IF#	Location	Region	Country	Start coord.	Time (UTC)	Path length	Max. width
IF1.5	S of Hilvan	Şanlıurfa	Turkey	37.4928°N 37.4928°E	10:50	Unknown	Unknown
IF1.5	A damaging tornado struck the village of Uzuncuk, causing significant structural damage. Numerous houses had their roofs torn off, trees were uprooted, and debris was scattered across the area. Two people were injured by flying debris and transported to hospital with non-life-threatening injuries.						

=== 8 April event ===
List of confirmed tornadoes – Wednesday, 8 April 2026
IF#	Location	Region	Country	Start coord.	Time (UTC)	Path length	Max. width
IF1	Diyarbakır area	Diyarbakır	Turkey	37.9627°N 40.1785°E	14:00	Unknown	Unknown
IF1	Video shows this tornado was picking up dust and damaging things in a field.						

== May ==
IFU	IF0	IF0.5	IF1	IF1.5	IF2	IF2.5	IF3	IF4	IF5	Total
4	0	1	4	1	8	1	0	1	0	20

- Two tornadoes have been confirmed but have not been rated yet.

=== 2 May event ===
List of confirmed tornadoes – Saturday, 2 May 2026
IF#	Location	Region	Country	Start coord.	Time (UTC)	Path length	Max. width
IFU	Dilek	Akdeniz Region	Turkey	36.5500°N 31.9600°E	07:35	Unknown	Unknown
IFU	A brief watersprount tornado was spotted in Dilek causing no reported damage.						

=== 3 May event ===
List of confirmed tornadoes – Sunday, May 3, 2026
EF#	Location	Region	Country	Start coord.	Time (UTC)	Path length	Max. width
IF4	S of Ayyasha to SW of Silsia / Çangallı to W of İnkılap to Üçdamlar to Çaybeyi to Akçamezra to E of Kayacık to S of Karadibek	Al-Bab in Aleppo / Elbeyli, Oğuzeli in Gaziantep	Syria / Turkey	36.78°N 37.52°E	12:10	27.1 km (16.8 mi)	790 m (860 yd)
IF4	See section on this tornado – A violent tornado affected several villages in Syria and Turkey. The tornado touched down in fields south of Ayyasha, a farming town in Aleppo Governorate, located near the Turkish border. The circulation was initially weak and embedded in heavy hail; however, it quickly intensified to IF2 strength as it impacted the town, where structural damage was reported to roofs and walls, and power lines and utility poles were bent or collapsed. Between Ayyasha and the nearby town of Silsia, numerous strong pistachio trees sustained heavy damage, with many being uprooted, snapped, or debranched, which after multiple damage surveys, were set at IF4 intensity. Silsila was then hit on the western edge by the tornado, where there was damage to vegetation and structures, with many houses losing roofs or walls. The tornado then crossed the border into Turkey, where it impacted the Turkish town of Çangallı. Maintaining IF2 intensity, roofs were damaged, power lines were downed, and a power transmission tower collapsed. The circulation then began to rapidly shrink, going from a width of around 600 meters to just 30 meters. It began to turn northwest in an attempted occlusion, but failed and made a loop over fields just west of İnkılap before continuing northeast. It remained weak with a deviant path before restabilizing on a nearly northward track, where it reached its maximum width of around 650 meters. It passed by the village of Çaybeyi, where intense damage was done to utility poles and outbuildings along a stretch of road west of the village at at least IF3 intensity. At least one outbuilding was completely demolished, and nearby trees were snapped and debranched. Continuing north, the tornado reached peak strength in the village of Akçamezra, where roofs were destroyed, utility poles collapsed, trailers and a semi-truck were respectively thrown/overturned, and several buildings received significant structural damage. On the southeastern side of the village, a solid brick and masonry construction home with around 30 cm thick walls with some stucco and veneer reinforcement was heavily damaged. A nearby car was also picked up and tossed around several meters. The damage at this area was of IF3 intensity. More damage up to IF2.5 intensity was recorded as the tornado tracked through the eastern part of the village, and another area of IF3 damage occurred when the tornado hit farmhouses on the outskirts of town. Several farmhouses received significant damage, and one was almost completely destroyed with just part of one wall remaining. The construction was also solid brick and stone masonry around 30–40 cm thick, though connections within the walls seemed weak and were not reinforced. The tornado moved through rural areas and crop fields until it reached east of Kayacık, where it damaged the roof of some farm buildings before crossing a highway. A van driving on the road was thrown into a nearby field, injuring 2 occupants. The tornado continued through the field, damaging trees and the roofs of farm buildings south of Karadibek before dissipating over some hills. This is the strongest tornado of Turkey and Syria, and the first official IF4 rated tornado since 2021.						
IF1.5	Oğuzeli	Gaziantep	Turkey	36.9651°N 37.5085°E	13:20		
IF1.5	This tornado impacted Oğuzeli, downing numerous trees and badly damaging roofs. A man was injured after his vehicle he was driving struck a road sign thrown by the tornado.						
IF2	E of Harran	Şanlıurfa	Turkey	36.8239°N 37.572°E	14:45		
IF2	A strong damaged solar panels around Aşağıkoçlu.						
IF2	ENE of Harran	Şanlıurfa	Turkey	37.0069°N 39.4224°E	15:00		
IF2	This significant tornado badly damaged homes and leveled farm buildings in Yukarıyazıcı. Roofs were also destroyed.						
IF2.5	SSW of Viranşehir	Şanlıurfa	Turkey	37.0459°N 39.6428°E	15:00		
IF2.5	A strong tornado caused significant damage to homes in the village of Malta.						
IF2	Viranşehir	Şanlıurfa	Turkey	37.2302°N 39.7932°E	15:00		
IF2	This strong tornado collapsed farm structures and enterprise homes. A solar panel park was also badly damaged.						
IF0.5	S of Viranşehir	Şanlıurfa	Turkey	37.0717°N 39.7345°E	15:15		
IF0.5	Minor damage occurred in the town of Ayaklı.						
IF2	NE of Viranşehir	Şanlıurfa	Turkey	37.3982°N 39.9019°E	15:15		
IF2	A strong tornado impacted Kalmazlar, completely destroying farmhouses and significantly damaging roofs on other buildings.						
IF2	NNE of Viranşehir	Şanlıurfa	Turkey	37.4179°N 39.8625°E	15:35		
IF2	A significant tornado struck the town of Kadıköy. The tornado collapsed transmission towers and destroyed farm buildings. Eight people were injured.						
IF2	Subaşı	Mardin	Turkey	37.4317°N 39.952°E	16:15		
IF2	This tornado struck Subaşı and caused significant damage in the village. A construction container was overturned, injuring four workers. Power poles were also collapsed.						
IF2	Gümüştaş to Harabe	Diyarbakır	Turkey	37.5599°N 40.0151°E	16:50	7 km (4.3 mi)	
IF2	A significant tornado snapped wooden utility poles, snapped or uprooted trees, damaged roofs and destroyed solar panels.						
IF1	NW of Çınar	Diyarbakır	Turkey	37.7302°N 40.3951°E	17:15		
IF1	A tornado damaged roofs and snapped or uprooted trees.						

=== 12 May event ===
List of confirmed tornadoes – Tuesday, 12 May 2026
IF#	Location	Region	Country	Start coord.	Time (UTC)	Path length	Max. width
IF1	Akkoyunlu	Şırnak	Turkey	37.3310°N 41.6800°E	13:00		
IF1	A tornado was observed causing damage. A sheet metal roof with wooden beam was thrown, light debris was lofted, rooftop water tanks were toppled, trees were uprooted/branches snapped. Probable landspout based on satellite data.						

=== 14 May event ===
List of confirmed tornadoes – Thursday, 14 May 2026
IF#	Location	Region	Country	Start coord.	Time (UTC)	Path length	Max. width
IFU	E of Menemen	İzmir	Turkey	38.597°N 27.1479°E	09:45	Unknown	Unknown
IFU	Tornado was reported and caused no reported damage.						
IF?	Bağdatlı	Çorum	Turkey	40.266°N 34.049°E	11:10		
IF?	Tornado was reported and possibly caused damage. More info to come.						
IF1	Kavşut	Çorum	Turkey	40.275°N 34.137°E	11:20		
IF1	A tornado caused damage to structures. More info to come.						
IF2	Oyaca	Çorum	Turkey	40.352°N 34.344°E	11:45		
IF2	A tornado caused damage in the Oyaca village causing 5 injuries. More info to come.						

=== 15 May event ===
List of confirmed tornadoes – Friday, 15 May 2026
IF#	Location	Region	Country	Start coord.	Time (UTC)	Path length	Max. width
IF?	SW of Kadirli	Osmaniye	Turkey	47.378°N 36.187°E	08:30		
IF?	Tornado was reported and possibly caused tree damage. More info to come.						

=== 20 May event ===
List of confirmed tornadoes – Wednesday, 20 May 2026
IF#	Location	Region	Country	Start coord.	Time (UTC)	Path length	Max. width
IF1	Kaşobası	Adana	Turkey	37.2774°N 36.3875°E	10:30		
IF1	A tornado was observed causing damage. More info to come.						

== June ==
IFU	IF0	IF0.5	IF1	IF1.5	IF2	IF2.5	IF3	IF4	IF5	Total
1	0	0	1	0	0	0	0	0	0	2

=== 12 June event ===
List of confirmed tornadoes – Friday, 12 June 2026
IF#	Location	Region	Country	Start coord.	Time (UTC)	Path length	Max. width
IFU	WSW of Kozluca	Kars	Turkey	40.51°N 43.46°E	11:15–11:25	Unknown	Unknown
IFU	A tornado touched down causing no damage.						

=== 24 June event ===
List of confirmed tornadoes – Wednesday, 24 June 2026
IF#	Location	Region	Country	Start coord.	Time (UTC)	Path length	Max. width
IF1	Ahlat	Bitlis	Turkey	38.7546°N 42.4833°E	09:15		
IF1	A tornado was observed and did damage to roofs. More info to come.						

== July ==
IFU	IF0	IF0.5	IF1	IF1.5	IF2	IF2.5	IF3	IF4	IF5	Total
3	0	1	1	0	0	0	0	0	0	5

=== July 4 event ===
List of confirmed tornadoes – Saturday, July 4, 2026
EF#	Location	Region	State/Province	Start coord.	Time (UTC)	Path length	Max. width
IFU	N of İzmit	Kocaeli	Turkey	40.8500°N 29.8833°E	14:30		
IFU	A waterspout came ashore damaging trees, umbrellas, and houses. More info to come.						
IFU	Ereğli	Zonguldak	Turkey	41.2908°N 31.3765°E	17:30		
IFU	A waterspout came ashore snapping tree branches.More info to come.						
IF0.5	Ereğli	Zonguldak	Turkey	41.2833°N 31.4167°E	17:47		
IF0.5	A waterspout came ashore damaging trees, sinking boats and ships, and damaging houses. More info to come.						

=== July 24 event ===
List of confirmed tornadoes – Friday, July 24, 2026
EF#	Location	Region	State/Province	Start coord.	Time (UTC)	Path length	Max. width
IF1	Pınarcık	Antalya	Turkey	37.0056°N 31.0344°E	20:50		
IF1	A tornado was observed downing trees, and damaging greenhouses.						

=== July 25 event ===
List of confirmed tornadoes – Saturday, July 25, 2026
EF#	Location	Region	State/Province	Start coord.	Time (UTC)	Path length	Max. width
IF?	Yumurtalık	Adana	Turkey	36.7725°N 35.7925°E	04:30		
IF?	A weak tornado was observed.More info to come.						

== August ==
IFU	IF0	IF0.5	IF1	IF1.5	IF2	IF2.5	IF3	IF4	IF5	Total
3	1	0	0	0	?	0	?	0	0	4

=== August 9 event ===
List of confirmed tornadoes – Sunday, August 9, 2026
EF#	Location	Region	State/Province	Start coord.	Time (UTC)	Path length	Max. width
IF0	Kurtsuyu	Düzce	Turkey	40.980679°N 31.252919°E	13:50		
IF0	A weak tornado which did minimal damage.						

=== August 13 event ===
List of confirmed tornadoes – Thursday, August 13, 2026
EF#	Location	Region	State/Province	Start coord.	Time (UTC)	Path length	Max. width
IFU	Tirebolu	Giresun	Turkey	41.007380°N 38.813805°E	16:45		
IFU	A cone shaped tornadic waterspout which stayed over water. No known damage occurred.						

=== August 16 event ===
List of confirmed tornadoes – Sunday, August 16, 2026
EF#	Location	Region	State/Province	Start coord.	Time (UTC)	Path length	Max. width
IFU	İmralı	Bursa Province	Turkey	40.53750°N 28.53500°E			
IFU	A nocturnal waterspout touched down near the cost of İmralı.						
IFU	Kilyos	İstanbul Province	Turkey	41.2486°N 29.0364°E	10:15		
IFU	A brief waterspout which touched down near the cost of İstanbul.						

== September ==
IFU	IF0	IF0.5	IF1	IF1.5	IF2	IF2.5	IF3	IF4	IF5	Total
1	0	0	1	0	0	0	0	0	0	2

=== September 18 event ===
List of confirmed tornadoes – Friday, September 18, 2026
EF#	Location	Region	State/Province	Start coord.	Time (UTC)	Path length	Max. width
IF?	Coast of Değirmenli	Trabzon	Turkey	41.0050°N 39.7475°E	12:00		
IF?	A waterspout that likely made landfall.More info to come.						

=== September 23 event ===
List of confirmed tornadoes – Wednesday, September 23, 2026
EF#	Location	Region	State/Province	Start coord.	Time (UTC)	Path length	Max. width
IF1	Cide	Kastamonu	Turkey	41.8976°N 32.9846°E	10:00		
IF1	A waterspout made landfall in Cide, Kastamonu, completely deroofing a beach cafe structure, shattering cafeteria glass panels, and heavily bending a metal signboard pole along the coastal road. The strong winds also overturned a portable metal cabin and fully uprooted several roadside trees.More info to come.						

== October ==
IFU	IF0	IF0.5	IF1	IF1.5	IF2	IF2.5	IF3	IF4	IF5	Total
0	0	1	1	2	2	0	1	0	0	7

=== October 1 event ===
List of confirmed tornadoes – Thursday, October 1, 2026
EF#	Location	Region	State/Province	Start coord.	Time (UTC)	Path length	Max. width
IF0.5	Mavikent	Antalya	Turkey	36.2974°N 30.3281°E	15:30		
IF0.5	A waterspout was observed moving onshore, where it damaged two greenhouses. The time was based on SAT data.						

=== October 13 event ===
List of confirmed tornadoes – Tuesday, October 13, 2026
EF#	Location	Region	State/Province	Start coord.	Time (UTC)	Path length	Max. width
IF1	Taşağıl	Antalya	Turkey	36.9042°N 31.2320°E	10:45		
IF1	A Tornado was reported which occurred over fields and greenhouses near Taşağıl village. Four greenhouses damaged / collapsed.						

=== October 15 event ===
List of confirmed tornadoes – Thursday, October 15, 2026
EF#	Location	Region	State/Province	Start coord.	Time (UTC)	Path length	Max. width
IF1.5	Taşkesen	Erzurum	Turkey	39.7110°N 41.4730°E	09:00		
IF1.5	A tornado struck Taşkesen, Erzurum. Multiple roofs were destroyed and multiple building experienced significant damage. More info to come.						

=== October 17 event ===
List of confirmed tornadoes – Saturday, October 17, 2026
EF#	Location	Region	State/Province	Start coord.	Time (UTC)	Path length	Max. width
IF1.5	Sarıçam	Adana	Turkey	37.0333°N 35.4124°E	09:00		
IF1.5	A tornado was reported/recorded, causing minor structural damage with roofs blown off houses and multiple strong trees were uprooted.						
IF2	Yüreğir	Adana	Turkey	37.0028°N 35.3726°E	12:00		
IF2	A brief but strong tornado struck Yüreğir, Adana.This tornado caused detachment and structural failure of solar panels, ripped roofs of prefabricated houses, and uprooted trees.						

=== October 26 event ===
List of confirmed tornadoes – Monday, October 26, 2026
EF#	Location	Region	State/Province	Start coord.	Time (UTC)	Path length	Max. width
IF3	Kepez	Antalya	Turkey	36.9460°N 30.6957°E	19:36		
IF3	An intense tornado struck portions of Kepez, Antalya, Turkey, collapsing a crane and destroying two shipping containers occupied by construction workers, with one being lofted 300 metres (980 ft) onto the roof of a school. The tornado threw five workers from the containers, killing four and leaving one injured, with two workers dying at the scene and two others being declared dead later at the hospital. The fifth worker sustained only minor injuries, and no other structures were reported to have been impacted by the tornado.						

=== October 29 event ===
List of confirmed tornadoes – Thursday, October 29, 2026
EF#	Location	Region	State/Province	Start coord.	Time (UTC)	Path length	Max. width
IF2	Karataş	Adana	Turkey	36.5496°N 35.3579°E	21:00		
IF2	A strong tornado hit an area of Karataş, Turkey in the early morning hours of October 29. A construction site container was likely lifted for a short distance and thrown, partly demolishing it.						

== November ==
IFU	IF0	IF0.5	IF1	IF1.5	IF2	IF2.5	IF3	IF4	IF5	Total
0	0	0	0	0	0	0	1	0	0	1

=== November 6 event ===
List of confirmed tornadoes – Friday, November 6, 2026
EF#	Location	Region	State/Province	Start coord.	Time (UTC)	Path length	Max. width
IF3	Qaljah	Amuda to Sulak	Turkey and Syria	37.0490°N 40.8320°E	21:00	20 km (12 mi)	
IF3	An intense tornado hit Turkey and Syria.						

== See also ==
- Tornadoes of 2026
- Weather of 2026
  - List of European tornadoes in 2026
- List of European tornadoes and tornado outbreaks
