= List of tornadoes in Turkey =

List of tornadoes that happened in Turkey

A large wedge tornado near Antalya on 24 January 2019

This page includes all Turkey tornadoes that are in the European Severe Weather Database. Unknown tornadoes (Tornadoes causing damage but not rated) are classified under IFU on this page.

== Climatology ==
Based on historical records and meteorological databases, including the Turkish State Meteorological Service and the European Severe Weather Database (ESWD), over 700 tornado events were documented in Turkey between 1818 and 2026. The intensity of these tornadoes typically ranges from IFU to IF4, with IF1 being the most common.

Most of the tornadoes that happen in Turkey are waterspouts or weak landspouts, but stronger events have been reported, like the Ankara-Çubuk F3 and Akçamezra-Oğuzeli IF4.

Tornadoes in Turkey usually cause significant damage because the country's infrastructure is not designed to withstand tornadoes or high-winds.

== List of tornadoes ==
=== Before 20th century ===
IFU	IF0	IF0.5	IF1	IF1.5	IF2	IF2.5	IF3	IF4	IF5	Total
0	0	0	0	0	1	0	0	0	0	1

List of confirmed tornadoes
F#	Location	Region	Start Coord.	Date	Time (UTC)	Casualties	Path length	Max width
F2	Çeşme	İzmir	38.3230°N 26.3060°E	5/12/1818	12:00	13 deaths	Unknown	Unknown
F2	A strong and historical tornado (initially developing as a waterspout) struck Çeşme in the İzmir Province, on 5 December 1818. According to 19th-century scientific literature by Gilbert (1828), this strong tornado made landfall, destroyed multiple houses, uprooted trees, and violently threw 13 people and 50 kettles into the sea. Based on the severe historical damage reports, it was rated F2 by ESWD and it stands as one of the earliest scientifically documented tornado events in Turkish history.							

=== 20th century ===
IFU	IF0	IF0.5	IF1	IF1.5	IF2	IF2.5	IF3	IF4	IF5	Total
5	0	0	0	0	1	0	0	0	0	6

List of confirmed tornadoes
F#	Location	Region	Start Coord.	Date	Time (UTC)	Casualties	Path length	Max width
F2	Büyükçekmece	Istanbul	41.0150°N 28.5600°E	19/07/1914	12:00	2 deaths, 14 injuries	Unknown	400 m (440 yd)
F2	A strong tornado (initially developing as a waterspout over the Sea of Marmara) made landfall southeast of Büyükçekmece, Istanbul, on 19 July 1914 between 14:30 and 15:00 local time. According to Ottoman Presidential Archive documents and contemporary media reports, the tornado reached a maximum width of approximately 400 meters. As it moved through the Harman location near the lake, it caused severe structural and agricultural destruction, completely flattening crop fields and throwing harvests hundreds of meters into the air. The event resulted in two fatalities and 14 injuries, with total financial damages estimated at 2,000 Ottoman Liras. This historic tornado was the record holder for the largest tornado in Turkey until 24 January 2019. It was rated F2 by ESWD.							
N/A	Adrianopel	Edirne	41.6770°N 26.5560°E	28/07/1930	00:00 (+/-6)	20 deaths, 100-1000 injuries	Unknown	Unknown
N/A	The 1930 Edirne tornado was a deadly tornado that struck Adrianopel, Edirne, during the night of 27–28 July 1930. This tornado struck the city center, damaging several houses and the historic Selimiye Mosque. According to the newspaper reports archived in the European Severe Weather Database (ESWD), the disaster killed 20 people and injured hundreds, making it the deadliest tornado ever recorded in Turkish history.							
IFU	Şile	Istanbul	41.1750°N 29.6110°E	10/08/1997	08:00	Unknown	Unknown	Unknown
IFU	This tornado developed over land at approximately 08:00 UTC, the event was documented by local media outlets, including reports archived by Kent Haber.							
N/A	Lara	Antalya	36.8560°N 30.8550°E	22/01/1998	09:00	1 death, 1 missing, 3 injuries	Unknown	Unknown
N/A	This tornado developed over land at approximately 09:00 UTC, this tornado caused significant casualties and damage. According to contemporary newspaper sources including Hürriyet and ESWD, the event resulted in one fatality, one missing person, and three injuries.							
IFU	Güzeloba	Antalya	36.8640°N 30.7850°E	22/01/1998	09:00	None	Unknown	Unknown
IFU	This tornado Developed over land at approximately 09:00 UTC, this tornado was part of the same severe weather outbreak reported by Hürriyet newspaper.							
N/A	Serik	Antalya	36.9170°N 31.0990°E	13/02/1999	02:00	1 death, 1 injury	Unknown	Unknown
N/A	This tornado struck the Serik district in the Antalya Province, on 13 February 1999. This tornado resulted in one fatality and one injury.							

=== 2000s ===
IFU	IF0	IF0.5	IF1	IF1.5	IF2	IF2.5	IF3	IF4	IF5	Total
43	2	0	12	3	2	0	2	0	0	60

F#	Location	Region	Start coord.	Date.	Time (UTC)	Casualties	Path length	Max. width
IFU	Kale	Antalya	36.2440°N 29.9850°E	28/11/2000	12:00	0	Unknown	Unknown
IFU	A tornado struck the Kale district (now known as Demre) in the Antalya Province, during the evening of 27 November 2000. Developing over land at approximately 20:00 UTC, this tornado caused localized destruction.							
IFU	İstiklal, Antalya, Aydın, Antalya and Esentepe, Antalya	Antalya	36.6110°N 32.6920°E	16/02/2001	09:00	0	5 km (3.1 mi)	Unknown
IFU	A tornado struck the İstiklal, Aydın, and Esentepe neighborhoods in the Antalya Province, on 16 February 2001. Developing over land at approximately 09:00 UTC, this tornado carved a damage path length of 5 kilometers.							
F1	Artova	Tokat	40.1170°N 36.3020°E	27/05/2001	15:00	0	Unknown	Unknown
F1	A tornado struck the Tanyeli settlement within the Artova district of Tokat Province, on 27 May 2001. Developing over land at approximately 15:00 UTC with a visible funnel cloud, this tornado was officially rated F1 by ESWD							
IFU	Karaçulha	Mersin	36.6610°N 29.2110°E	24/11/2001	12:00	0	Unknown	Unknown
IFU	A tornado struck the Karaçulha neighborhood in the Muğla Province, on 24 November 2001. Developing over land at approximately 12:00 UTC, this tornado caused minor property damage, such as smashing windows and whirling loose material.							
IFU	Hacımehmetli	Konya	38.3330°N 32.2500°E	12/03/2002	16:00	0	Unknown	Unknown
IFU	A tornado struck the Hacımehmetli neighborhood in the Konya Province, on 12 March 2002. Developing over land at approximately 16:00 UTC, this tornado had an average path width of 30 meters.							
IFU	Muratlı	Tekirdağ	41.1710°N 27.5030°E	20/03/2002	16:00	0 (1 injured)	Unknown	Unknown
IFU	A tornado struck the Muratlı district in the Tekirdağ Province, on 20 March 2002. Developing over land at approximately 16:00 UTC, this tornado caused localized damage and resulted in 1 injury.							
IFU	Kozlu	Zonguldak	41.4700°N 31.7460°E	13/06/2002	16:00	0	Unknown	Unknown
IFU	A waterspout was observed over the sea near the Kozlu district in the Zonguldak Province, on 13 June 2002. Developing entirely over water at approximately 16:00 UTC, the event caused no reported damage or casualties.							
Unknown	Dalaman	Muğla	36.7650°N 28.8042°E	02/02/2003	00:00	0	Unknown	Unknown
Unknown	A tornado struck the Dalaman area in the Muğla Province, on 2 February 2003. Developing over land at approximately 00:00 UTC, this tornado caused localized structural damage to several houses and barns.							
IFU	Kale	Antalya	36.2444°N 29.9850°E	02/02/2003	03:00	0	Unknown	Unknown
IFU	A tornado struck the Kale area in the Antalya Province, on 2 February 2003. Developing over land at approximately 03:00 UTC, this tornado caused no reported damage.							
F3	Sunlü	Ankara	40.1870°N 33.0370°E	19/06/2004	09:30	3 (14 injured)	1 km (0.62 mi)	150 m (160 yd)
F3	An Intense F3 tornado struck the Sünlü village in the Çubuk district of Ankara Province, on 19 June 2004. Developing over land at approximately 09:30 UTC for a duration of 10 minutes, this tornado carved a 1 km (0.62 mi) path length with a maximum width of 150 m (160 yd). The disaster caused catastrophic destruction, completely destroying 19 houses down to their foundation walls and throwing a Dodge pickup truck 100 m (110 yd) away. According to the Turkish media and the Turkish State Meteorological Service reports, the event resulted in three fatalities (including two children) and 14 injuries. Based on the severe structural devastation, the tornado was officially given a rating of F3 by ESWD, making it one of the most intense documented tornadoes in modern Turkish history.							
Unknown	Çaycuma	Zonguldak	41.4264°N 32.0756°E	11/08/2004	17:00	0 (11 injured)	Unknown	Unknown
Unknown	A tornado struck a textile industry area in Çaycuma, Zonguldak Province, on 11 August 2004. Developing over land at approximately 17:00 UTC, the tornado caused structural damage and resulted in 11 injuries.							
IFU	Şahinağa	Adana	36.8000°N 35.4000°E	21/11/2004	12:30	0	Unknown	Unknown
IFU	A tornado was observed over land in the Şahinağa neighborhood of Adana Province, on 21 November 2004 at approximately 12:30 UTC, causing no reported casualties or damage.							
IF1.5	Ayvacık	Çanakkale	39.6011°N 26.4047°E	27/1/2005	02:00	0 (2 injured)	Unknown	Unknown
IF1.5	A destructive tornado struck the Ahmetçe village in the Ayvacık district of Çanakkale Province, on 27 January 2005. Moving inland from the Aegean Sea, the tornado completely destroyed the minaret of the village mosque, which collapsed onto two neighboring houses, and ripped the roof off four other homes. The storm also severed power lines and snapped numerous historic olive trees in the region. The event resulted in two injuries, including a resident who was reportedly thrown 20 meters by the force of the wind, and caused significant financial damage to the community. It was rated IF1.5 by ESWD							
IFU	Danışment	Eskişehir	39.8830°N 30.7000°E	1/06/2005	14:00	0	Unknown	Unknown
IFU	A tornado was observed over land in the Danışment neighborhood of Eskişehir Province, on 1 June 2005 at approximately 14:00 UTC, causing no reported casualties or damage.							
IFU	Gerze	Sinop	41.8200°N 35.3500°E	21/08/2005	10:00	0	Unknown	Unknown
IFU	A waterspout was observed over the Black Sea. Causing no reported casualties or damage.							
IFU	Unspecified	Ordu	40.9847°N 37.8789°E	1/09/2005	08:00	0	Unknown	Unknown
IFU	A tornado was reported in the Ordu Province. Causing no reported casualties or damage.							
IFU	N of Kefken	Kocaeli	41.2000°N 30.2300°E	1/09/2005	16:00	0	Unknown	Unknown
IFU	A tornado was reported in the coast of Kefken, Kocaeli. Causing no reported casualties or damage.							
Unknown	Selbeyi	Sinop	41.9667°N 34.8500°E	11/09/2005	10:00	0	Unknown	Unknown
Unknown	A tornado struck the Selbeyi village in the Sinop Province, on 11 September 2005. Developing over land at approximately 10:00 UTC, this tornado caused significant structural damage, including the destruction of houses.							
IF1.5	Kumluca	Yeşilköy	36.7167°N 31.6000°E	02/10/2005	14:00	0	Unknown	Unknown
IF1.5	A destructive tornado struck the Yeşilköy village and Adrasan resort in the Kumluca district of Antalya Province, on 23 October 2005. Developing around 17:00 local time and lasting approximately ten minutes, the tornado caused widespread structural damage, completely ripping off roofs and collapsing walls of 22 residential houses. Additionally, severe agricultural destruction was reported, damaging 30 decares of greenhouses and 50 decares of citrus orchards, alongside severing local power and communication lines. It was rated IF1.5 by ESWD.							
IFU	Unspecified	Adana	37.0050°N 35.3000°E	16/10/2005	13:00	0	Unknown	Unknown
IFU	A tornado was reported in the Adana region. Causing no reported casualties or significant damage.							
F1	Yenimahalle	Antalya	37.1370°N 30.7990°E	18/11/2005	13:00	0	Unknown	Unknown
F1	A tornado struck the Yenimahalle and Karşıyaka neighborhoods in the Antalya Province, on 18 November 2005. Developing over land at approximately 13:00 UTC with a visible funnel cloud, this tornado was officially given rating of F1 by ESWD.							
Unknown	Armutlu	Yalova	40.5194°N 28.8281°E	08/08/2006	10:00	0	Unknown	Unknown
Unknown	A tornado struck the Armutlu district in the Yalova Province. The tornado caused localized structural damage to houses and uprooted trees.							
IFU	Antalya	Akdeniz Region	36.8400°N 30.6700°E	18/10/2006	11:00	0	Unknown	Unknown
IFU	A significant outbreak of nine separate waterspouts was observed simultaneously over the sea near the Muratpaşa district of Antalya Province. No reported damage. This entry refers to one of them.							
IFU	Antalya	Akdeniz Region	36.8400°N 30.6700°E	18/10/2026	11:00	0	Unknown	Unknown
IFU	A significant outbreak of nine separate waterspouts was observed simultaneously over the sea near the Muratpaşa district of Antalya Province. No reported damage. This entry refers to one of them.							
IFU	Antalya	Akdeniz Region	36.8400°N 30.6700°E	18/10/2006	11:00	0	Unknown	Unknown
IFU	A significant outbreak of nine separate waterspouts was observed simultaneously over the sea near the Muratpaşa district of Antalya Province. No reported damage. This entry refers to one of them.							
IFU	Antalya	Akdeniz Region	36.8400°N 30.6700°E	18/10/2006	11:00	0	Unknown	Unknown
IFU	A significant outbreak of nine separate waterspouts was observed simultaneously over the sea near the Muratpaşa district of Antalya Province. No reported damage. This entry refers to one of them.							
IFU	Antalya	Akdeniz Region	36.8400°N 30.6700°E	18/10/2006	11:00	0	Unknown	Unknown
IFU	A significant outbreak of nine separate waterspouts was observed simultaneously over the sea near the Muratpaşa district of Antalya Province. No reported damage. This entry refers to one of them.							
IFU	Antalya	Akdeniz Region	36.8400°N 30.6700°E	18/10/2006	11:00	0	Unknown	Unknown
IFU	A significant outbreak of nine separate waterspouts was observed simultaneously over the sea near the Muratpaşa district of Antalya Province. No reported damage. This entry refers to one of them.							
IFU	Antalya	Akdeniz Region	36.8400°N 30.6700°E	18/10/2006	11:00	0	Unknown	Unknown
IFU	A significant outbreak of nine separate waterspouts was observed simultaneously over the sea near the Muratpaşa district of Antalya Province. No reported damage.This entry refers to one of them.							
IFU	Antalya	Akdeniz Region	36.8400°N 30.6700°E	18/10/2006	11:00	0	Unknown	Unknown
IFU	A significant outbreak of nine separate waterspouts was observed simultaneously over the sea near the Muratpaşa district of Antalya Province. No reported damage.This entry refers to one of them.							
IFU	Antalya	Akdeniz Region	36.8400°N 30.6700°E	18/10/2006	11:00	0	Unknown	Unknown
IFU	A significant outbreak of nine separate waterspouts was observed simultaneously over the sea near the Muratpaşa district of Antalya Province. No reported damage. This entry refers to one of them.							
IFU	Unspecified	Alanya	36.5525°N 32.0025°E	19/10/2006	12:00	0	Unknown	Unknown
IFU	A Waterspout which stayed over water.							
F1	Unspecified	N of Sinop	42.0250°N 35.1575°E	26/10/2006	12:30	0	Unknown	Unknown
F1	A tornado struck the Selbeyi village in the Sinop Province, on 11 September 2005. The tornado caused moderate structural damage. Video evidence and contemporary media reports confirm that the intense winds heavily damaged residential roofs and shattered windows. Eyewitness accounts from local interviews documented the severity of the sudden indoor impact, flying debris, and scattering of household belongings during the event.This tornado lasted 2 minutes and was given a rating of F1 by ESWD.							
Unknown	Unspecified/Unknown	Hizan	38.2167°N 42.4333°E	4/05/2007	02:00	0	Unknown	Unknown
Unknown	A tornado which is barely documented on ESWD and local media. No image of the tornado surfaced.							
F1	Doluca	Batman	38.0140°N 41.1860°E	26/05/2007	16:00	0	Unknown	Unknown
F1	A tornado caused damages to solid trees.							
F1	Erciş	Van	39.2072°N 43.3769°E	28/05/2007	09:00	0	5 km (3.1 mi)	Unknown
F1	A tornado struck the village of Hasanabdal in Erciş. The tornado completely ripped off the metal roofing of 20 residential homes and destroyed livestock barns. Debris from the roofs was lofted and scattered up to 5 kilometers (3.1 mi) away, and numerous trees were entirely uprooted. While no casualties were reported, the severe damage prompted village leaders to request emergency relocation due to the compounding natural disasters.							
F0	Gürpınar	Istanbul	40.96°N 28.95°E	27/06/2007	08:00	0	Unknown	Unknown
F0	A rare waterspout made landfall in Gürpınar, İstanbul. This tornado caused minor damage.							
Unknown	Karanlıkdere	Balıkesir	39.79°N 28.5°E	27/06/2007	08:00	0	Unknown	Unknown
Unknown	A tornado observed and filmed near Karanlikdere.							
IFU	Unspecified	Giresun	40.93°N 38.4°E	16/07/2007	08:00	0	Unknown	Unknown
IFU	A waterspout observed near Giresun over the Black Sea.							
F2	Umuttepe	Van	39.1225°N 44.0656°E	27/07/2007	09:00	0	Unknown	Unknown
F2	A tornado struck Umuttepe, Van. Only one photo of the damages available at present. It was given a rating of F2 by ESWD with the rating having high uncertainty.							
IFU	Unspecified	İskenderun	36.5817°N 36.1650°E	5/10/2007	09:00	0	Unknown	Unknown
IFU	A Waterspout was spotted in the Coast of İskenderun.							
F1	İmamlar	Denizli	37.1081°N 29.3936°E	5/11/2007	05:00	0	Unknown	Unknown
F1	A tornado struck İmamlar, Denizli. Only a few photos of the damages available at present. It was given a rating of F1 by ESWD with the rating having high uncertainty.							
F1	Çerçikaya	Hatay	36.4167°N 36.0833°E	6/11/2007	22:00	0	Unknown	Unknown
F1	A nocturnal tornado struck Çerçikaya, Hatay. It was given a rating of F1 by ESWD.							
F1	Fethiye	Muğla	36.6220°N 29.1160°E	13/11/2007	13:00	0	Unknown	Unknown
F1	A tornado reported which tracked through Mugla province, destroying greenhouses. It was given a rating of F1 by ESWD.							
F1	Manavgat	Antalya	36.7870°N 31.4430°E	5/12/2007	11:00	0	Unknown	Unknown
F1	A tornado near Antalya reported which caused high damages. It was given a rating of F1 by ESWD.							
Unknown	Kalkan	Antalya	36.2660°N 29.4150°E	12/03/2008	15:00	0	Unknown	Unknown
Unknown	A tornadic waterspout made landfall near Antalya. Damage was observed but it is unspecified how severe it was.							
Unknown	Unspecified	S of Antalya	36.9050°N 30.7300°E	31/07/2008	13:30	0 (7 injured)	Unknown	Unknown
Unknown	A tornadic waterspout made landfall near Antalya. 7 people were injured.							
F1	Nusaybin	Mardin	37.0700°N 41.2170°E	23/08/2008	21:00	0	Unknown	Unknown
F1	A tornado struck Nusaybin, Mardin.							
F2	Karateke	İzmir	38.1000°N 27.6830°E	16/09/2008	09:00	0	Unknown	Unknown
F2	A tornado reported that hit Karateke village; barns were completely destroyed.							
IFU	Mahmutlar	Antalya	36.4600°N 32.0990°E	18/09/2008	06:00	0	Unknown	Unknown
IFU	A Waterspout was spotted near the coast of Mahmutlar, Antalya							
IFU	Mürefte	Marmara region	40.6500°N 27.2400°E	24/09/2008	09:00	0	Unknown	Unknown
IFU	A Waterspout was spotted near the coast of Mürefte.							
IFU	N of Karamürsel	Kocaeli	40.6890°N 29.6150°E	3/10/2008	09:00	0	Unknown	Unknown
IFU	A Waterspout was spotted at the Gulf of İzmit.							
IFU	SE of Kargıcak	Mersin	36.4200°N 33.6700°E	22/11/2008	10:00	0	Unknown	Unknown
IFU	A Waterspout was spotted near the coast of Kargıcak, Mersin.							
F1	Çerçikaya	Hatay	36.4170°N 36.0830°E	2/01/2009	10:00	0	Unknown	Unknown
F1	A tornado struck Çerçikaya, Hatay. Moderate damage occurred							
IFU	İskenderun	Hatay	36.5820°N 36.0800°E	3/01/2009	17:00	0	Unknown	Unknown
IFU	A waterspout was spotted.							
F1	Beymelek	Antalya	36.2600°N 30.0340°E	14/01/2009	14:00	0	Unknown	Unknown
F1	A tornado was reported which hit Beymelek village; up to 40 houses damaged.							
Unknown	Hacıveliler	Antalya	36.3500°N 30.3000°E	23/01/2009	10:00	0	Unknown	Unknown
Unknown	A tornado reported in Haciveliler settlement near Kumluca; 5 houses were damaged.							
Unknown	Kaş	Antalya	36.2010°N 29.6390°E	24/01/2009	09:00	0	Unknown	Unknown
Unknown	A tornado reported which damaged up to 100 houses and several greenhouses.							
IFU	Unspecified	N Sinop	42.0500°N 35.2500°E	01/02/2009	16:38	0	Unknown	Unknown
IFU	A waterspout was observed near the coast of Sinop.							
Unknown	Kılıçlı	Adana	37.0790°N 35.4560°E	14/02/2009	12:00	0 (1 injured)	Unknown	Unknown
Unknown	A tornado that caused damage. 1 person was injured.							
F3	Nizip	Gaziantep	37.0100°N 37.7940°E	14/02/2009	14:00	4 deaths	10 km (6.2 mi)	Unknown
F3	An intense tornado struck Nizip, Gaziantep. 4 people were killed. Multiple cars were thrown and a van and a truck received significant damage. It was given a rating of F3 by ESWD.							
IF0	SSW of Gazipaşa	Antalya	36.2200°N 32.2700°E	23/02/2009	09:00	0	Unknown	Unknown
IF0	A waterspout off-shore was reported near Gazipasa. several km SW of Alanya; waterspout hit some boats.							
Unknown	Fethiye	Muğla	36.6400°N 29.1160°E	9/03/2009	06:00	0	Unknown	Unknown
Unknown	A tornado report in Fethiye. Mugla Province; damages to the lical cemetery caused.							
IF1.5	Unspecified	Erzurum	39.9090°N 41.2000°E	19/03/2009	10:00	0	Unknown	Unknown
IF1.5	A tornado reported which hit the region near Erzurum; houses and power lines damaged; roofs blown away.							

=== 2010s ===
IFU	IF0	IF0.5	IF1	IF1.5	IF2	IF2.5	IF3	IF4	IF5	Total
0	0	0	0	0	0	0	0	0	0	0

=== 2026 ===
==== May 3 ====
List of confirmed tornadoes – Sunday, May 3, 2026 (Note: All dates are based on the local time zone where the tornado touched down; however, all times are in Coordinated Universal Time for consistency.)
EF#	Location	Region	Country	Start coord.	Time (UTC)	Path length	Max. width
IF4	S of Ayyasha to SW of Silsila / Çangallı to W of İnkılap to Üçdamlar to Çaybeyi to Akçamezra to E of Kayacık to S of Karadibek	Al-Bab in Aleppo / Elbeyli, Oğuzeli in Gaziantep	Syria / Turkey	36.78°N 37.52°E	12:10	27.1 km (16.8 mi)	790 m (860 yd)
IF4	See section on this tornado – A violent tornado affected several villages in Syria and Turkey. The tornado touched down in fields south of Ayyasha, a farming town in Aleppo Governorate, located near the Turkish border. The circulation was initially weak and embedded in heavy hail; however, it quickly intensified to IF2 strength as it impacted the town, where structural damage was reported to roofs and walls, and power lines and utility poles were bent or collapsed. Between Ayyasha and the nearby town of Silsila, numerous strong pistachio trees sustained heavy damage, with many being uprooted, snapped, or debranched, which after multiple damage surveys, were set at IF4 intensity. Silsila was then hit on the western edge by the tornado, where there was damage to vegetation and structures, with many homes losing roofs or walls. The tornado then crossed the border into Turkey, where it impacted the Turkish town of Çangallı. Maintaining IF2 intensity, roofs were damaged, power lines were downed, and a power transmission tower collapsed. The circulation then began to rapidly shrink, going from a width of around 600 meters to just 30 meters. It began to turn northwest in an attempted occlusion, but failed and made a loop over fields just west of İnkılap before continuing northeast. It remained weak with a deviant path before restabilizing on a nearly northward track, where it reached its maximum width of around 790 meters. It passed by the village of Çaybeyi, where intense damage was done to utility poles and outbuildings along a stretch of road west of the village at atleast IF3 intensity. At least one outbuilding was completely demolished, and nearby trees were snapped and debranched. Continuing north, the tornado reached peak strength in the village of Akçamezra, where roofs were destroyed, utility poles collapsed, trailers and a semi-truck were respectively thrown/overturned, and several buildings received significant structural damage. On the southeastern side of the village, a solid brick and masonry construction home with around 30cm thick walls with some stucco and veneer reinforcement was heavily damaged. A nearby car was also picked up and tossed around several meters. The damage at this area was of IF3 intensity. More damage up to IF2+ intensity was recorded as the tornado tracked through the eastern part of the village, and another area of IF3 damage occurred when the tornado hit farmhouses on the outskirts of town. Several farmhouses received significant damage, and one was almost completely destroyed with just part of one wall remaining. The construction was also solid brick and stone masonry around 30-40cm thick, though connections within the walls seemed weak and were not reinforced. The tornado moved through rural areas and crop fields until it reached east of Kayacık, where it damaged the roof of some farm buildings before crossing a highway. A van driving on the road was thrown into a nearby field, injuring 2 occupants. The tornado continued through the field, damaging trees and the roofs of farm buildings south of Karadibek before dissipating over some hills. This is the strongest tornado of Turkey and Syria, and the first official IF4 rated tornado since 2021.						
IF1.5	Oğuzeli	Gaziantep	Turkey	36.9651°N 37.5085°E	13:20		
IF1.5	This tornado impacted Oğuzeli, downing numerous trees and badly damaging roofs. A man was injured after his vehicle he was driving struck a road sign thrown by the tornado.						
IF2	E of Harran	Şanlıurfa	Turkey	36.8239°N 37.572°E	14:45		
IF2	A strong tornado damaged solar panels around Aşağıkoçlu.						
IF2	ENE of Harran	Şanlıurfa	Turkey	37.0069°N 39.4224°E	15:00		
IF2	This significant tornado badly damaged homes and leveled farm buildings in Yukarıyazıcı. Roofs were also destroyed.						
IF2.5	SSW of Viranşehir	Şanlıurfa	Turkey	37.0459°N 39.6428°E	15:00		
IF2.5	A strong tornado caused significant damage to homes in the village of Malta.						
IF2	Viranşehir	Şanlıurfa	Turkey	37.2302°N 39.7932°E	15:00		
IF2	This strong tornado collapsed farm structures and enterprise homes. A solar panel park was also badly damaged.						
IF0.5	S of Viranşehir	Şanlıurfa	Turkey	37.0717°N 39.7345°E	15:15		
IF0.5	Minor damage occurred in the town of Ayaklı.						
IF2	NE of Viranşehir	Şanlıurfa	Turkey	37.3982°N 39.9019°E	15:15		
IF2	A strong tornado impacted Kalmazlar, completely destroying farmhouses and significantly damaging roofs on other buildings.						
IF2	NNE of Viranşehir	Şanlıurfa	Turkey	37.4179°N 39.8625°E	15:35		
IF2	A significant tornado struck the town of Kadıköy. The tornado collapsed transmission towers and destroyed farm buildings. Eight people were injured.						
IF2	Subaşı	Mardin	Turkey	37.4317°N 39.952°E	16:15		
IF2	This tornado struck Subaşı and caused significant damage in the village. A construction container was overturned, injuring four workers. Power poles were also collapsed.						
IF2	Gümüştaş to Harabe	Diyarbakır	Turkey	37.5599°N 40.0151°E	16:50	7 km (4.3 mi)	
IF2	A significant tornado snapped wooden utility poles, snapped or uprooted trees, damaged roofs and destroyed solar panels.						
IF1	NW of Çınar	Diyarbakır	Turkey	37.7302°N 40.3951°E	17:15		
IF1	A tornado damaged roofs and snapped or uprooted trees.						

==== October 17 ====
List of confirmed tornadoes – Saturday, October 17, 2026
EF#	Location	Region	Country	Start coord.	Time (UTC)	Path length	Max. width
IFU	Alanya	Akdeniz Bölgesi	Turkey	36.4839°N 31.9604°E	05:30	Unknown	Unknown
IFU	A waterspout was spotted. No damages were reported.						
IFU	İncekum	Akdeniz Bölgesi	Turkey	36.6146°N 31.7285°E	06:00	Unknown	Unknown
IFU	A waterspout was spotted. No damages were reported.						
IFU	Eğerce Mahallesi	Marmara	Turkey	40.3705°N 28.6346°E	09:00	Unknown	Unknown
IFU	A waterspout was spotted. No damages were reported.						
IF1.5	Sarıçam	Adana Province	Turkey	37.0333°N 35.4124°E	09:00	Unknown	Unknown
IF1.5	A tornado was reported, causing minor structural damage with roofs blown off houses and multiple strong trees were uprooted.						
IF1.5	Karasu Mahallesi	Sakarya Province	Turkey	41.0712°N 30.7849°E	09:00	Unknown	Unknown
IF1.5	A tornado struck the Karasu Mahallesi neighbourhood, damaged several roofs, and lifted and scattered roof tiles.						
IF2	Yüreğir	Adana Province	Turkey	37.0028°N 35.3726°E	12:00	Unknown	Unknown
IF2	A brief but strong tornado stuck Yüreğir, Adana Province. This tornado caused detachment and structural failure of solar panels, ripped roofs of prefabricated houses, and uprooted trees.						

==== October 25 ====
List of confirmed tornadoes – Sunday, October 25, 2026
EF#	Location	Region	Country	Start coord.	Time (UTC)	Path length	Max. width
IF1	Halilağa	Van Province	Turkey	38.499°N 43.3698°E	02:25	Unknown	Unknown
IF1	A tornado was reported to have damaged roofs in Halilağa.						

==== October 26 ====
List of confirmed tornadoes – Monday, October 26, 2026
EF#	Location	Region	Country	Start coord.	Time (UTC)	Path length	Max. width
IF3	Kepez	Antalya Province	Turkey	36.946°N 30.6957°E	19:36		
IF3	4 fatalities – The tornado struck a construction site in the Fevzi Çakmak neighbourhood of Kepez, Antalya, collapsing a crane and destroying two shipping containers occupied by construction workers. One of the containers, measuring approximately 20 ft (6 m) in length and weighing at least 2-2.5 tonnes (2.2-2.8 short tons) when empty and potentially up to 4 tonnes (4.4 short tons) when occupied, was lofted approximately 300 metres (980 ft) onto the roof of a school. One person was injured. The ESSL assessed the tornado as IF3, coded SCC/3, based on the lofting of the heavy construction-site container.						

==== October 29 ====
List of confirmed tornadoes – Thursday, October 29, 2026
EF#	Location	Region	Country	Start coord.	Time (UTC)	Path length	Max. width
IF2	Karataş	Adana Province	Turkey	36.5496°N 35.3579°E	21:00	Unknown	Unknown
IF2	A tornado stuck an area of Karataş, reportedly lifting a construction site container a short distance before overturning it. the container was partially demolished.						

== See also ==
- List of European tornadoes in 2026
- List of European tornadoes and tornado outbreaks
- 2026 Akçamezra tornado
- List of Turkish tornadoes in 2026
