= 2026 Turkey tornado outbreak =

2026 tornado outbreak in Turkey

- Radar imagery of tornadic storms 14 minutes after the IF4 tornado touched down near Turkey/Syria.

Meteorological history
- Date: 3 May 2026

Tornado outbreak
- Tornadoes: 14
- Max. rating: IF4 tornado
- Duration: 6 hours, 10 minutes
- Highest winds: Tornadic – 380 km/h (240 mph) (Akçamezra, Turkey IF4 on 3 May) (Highest tornadic windspeed ever recorded in Turkey)
- Highest gusts: Non-tornadic – 180 km/h (110 mph) (Gaziantep Province, Turkey) (Highest non-tornadic windspeed ever recorded in Turkey)
- Lowest pressure: 998 hPa (mbar); 29.47 inHg
- Largest hail: 7 cm (2.8 in) in Tabqa, Syria (Tied for largest recorded hailstone in Syria)

Overall effects
- Fatalities: 0 (+3 non–tornadic)
- Injuries: 21 (+46 non-tornadic)
- Areas affected: Southern Turkey, Northern and Western Syria, Cyprus
- Part of the Tornado outbreaks of 2026

A violent tornado outbreak took place on 3 May 2026 across the Middle Eastern countries of Turkey and Syria. Throughout the day, several weak to strong tornadoes touched down in southern Turkey and Syria, severely damaging multiple structures and vegetation. Of the 14 tornadoes which occurred during the outbreak, nine tornadoes were rated at or above IF2. One tornado which crossed the Turkey/Syria border received a rating of IF4, marking it as the first violent (IF4+) tornado in the Middle East and the first of such tornadoes to occur outside of the Americas since 2021.

In total, the outbreak would produce 14 tornadoes, injuring 21 people. A significant wind event accompanying this outbreak would kill 3 people and injure a further 46 other people.

== Meteorological synopsis ==
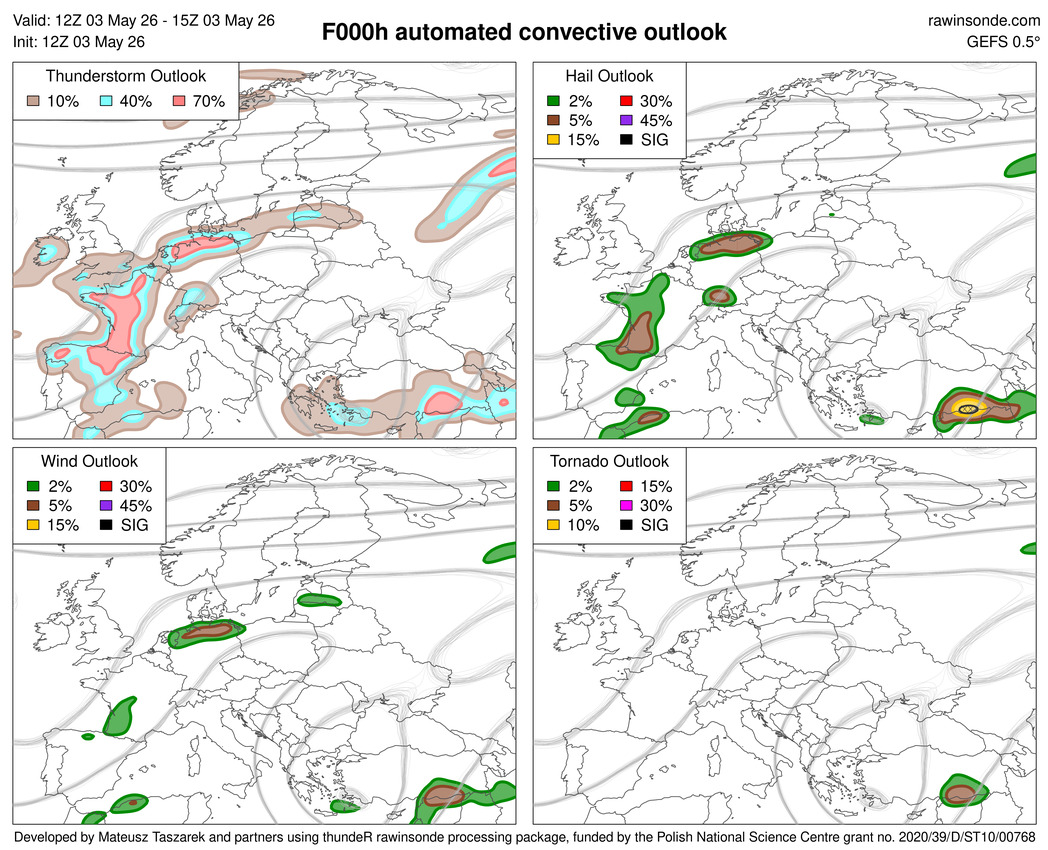
Automated convective outlook for the area on 3 May 2026 at 12Z.

Early on 3 May, the European Storm Forecast Experiment outlined a level 1/3 severe weather threat across southern Turkey and northern Syria, primarily for large hail and strong to severe wind gusts. A tornado risk was not initially anticipated, however.

A strong ridge extended from North Africa to Eastern/Central Europe, framed by two upper-level troughs to its east and west. The eastern trough, which was positioned over the Aegean Sea and Turkey, had near record-low thickness values. This trough was accompanied by a broad low-level vortex affecting most of Turkey.

== Confirmed tornadoes ==
IFU	IF0	IF0.5	IF1	IF1.5	IF2	IF2.5	IF3	IF4	IF5	Total
1	0	1	2	1	7	1	0	1	0	14

=== 3 May event ===
List of confirmed tornadoes – Sunday, 3 May 2026 (Note: All dates are based on the local time zone where the tornado touched down; however, all times are in Coordinated Universal Time for consistency.)
IF#	Location	Region	Country	Start coord.	Time (UTC)	Path length	Max. width
IF1	Sygkrasi	Famagusta	Cyprus	35.273°N 33.852°E	11:05		
IF1	A tornado was reported to have damaged roofs in Sygkrasi.						
IFU	Hama	Hama	Syria	35.138°N 36.756°E	11:40	Unknown	Unknown
IFU	A brief landspout tornado was spotted in Hama causing no reported damage.						
IF4	S of Ayyasha, SY to Akçamezra, TR to Kayacık, TR	Aleppo (SY), Kilis (TR), Gaziantep (TR), Adıyaman (TR)	Syria, Turkey	36.668°N 37.521°E	12:10–12:40	27.1 km (16.8 mi)	790 m (860 yd)
IF4	See section on this tornado. 2 people were injured.						
IF1.5	Oğuzeli	Gaziantep	Turkey	36.9651°N 37.5085°E	13:20		
IF1.5	This tornado impacted Oğuzeli, downing numerous trees and badly damaging roofs. A man was injured after his vehicle he was driving struck a road sign thrown by the tornado.						
IF2	E of Harran	Şanlıurfa	Turkey	36.8239°N 37.572°E	14:45		
IF2	A strong damaged solar panels around Aşağıkoçlu.						
IF2	ENE of Harran	Şanlıurfa	Turkey	37.0069°N 39.4224°E	15:00		
IF2	This significant tornado badly damaged homes and leveled farm buildings in Yukarıyazıcı. Roofs were also destroyed.						
IF2.5	SSW of Viranşehir	Şanlıurfa	Turkey	37.0459°N 39.6428°E	15:00		
IF2.5	A strong tornado caused significant damage to homes in the village of Malta.						
IF2	Viranşehir	Şanlıurfa	Turkey	37.2302°N 39.7932°E	15:00		
IF2	This strong tornado collapsed farm structures and enterprise homes. A solar panel park was also badly damaged.						
IF0.5	S of Viranşehir	Şanlıurfa	Turkey	37.0717°N 39.7345°E	15:15		
IF0.5	Minor damage occurred in the town of Ayaklı.						
IF2	NE of Viranşehir	Şanlıurfa	Turkey	37.3982°N 39.9019°E	15:15		
IF2	A strong tornado impacted Kalmazlar, completely destroying farmhouses and significantly damaging roofs on other buildings.						
IF2	NNE of Viranşehir	Şanlıurfa	Turkey	37.4179°N 39.8625°E	15:35		
IF2	A significant tornado struck the town of Kadıköy. The tornado collapsed transmission towers and destroyed farm buildings. Eight people were injured.						
IF2	Subaşı	Mardin	Turkey	37.4317°N 39.952°E	16:15		
IF2	This tornado struck Subaşı and caused significant damage in the village. A construction container was overturned, injuring four workers. Power poles were also collapsed.						
IF2	Gümüştaş to Harabe	Diyarbakır	Turkey	37.5599°N 40.0151°E	16:50	7 km (4.3 mi)	
IF2	A significant tornado snapped wooden utility poles, snapped or uprooted trees, damaged roofs and destroyed solar panels.						
IF1	NW of Çınar	Diyarbakır	Turkey	37.7302°N 40.3951°E	17:15		
IF1	A tornado damaged roofs and snapped or uprooted trees.						

=== Ayyasha, Syria/Çaybeyi–Akçamezra–Kayacık, Turkey ===
Ayyasha, Syria/Akçamezra–Kayacık, Turkey
- The thin but violent tornado as seen near Çangallı, Elbeyli District.

Meteorological history
- Formed: 3 May 2026, 3:10 p.m. TRT (UTC+03:00)
- Dissipated: 3 May 2026, 3:40 p.m. TRT (UTC+03:00)
- Duration: 30 minutes

IF4 tornado
- Highest winds: 380 km/h (240 mph)

Overall effects
- Fatalities: 0
- Injuries: 2

This violent and damaging tornado first touched down at 3:10 p.m. TRT, near the Turkish border just southeast of Ayyasha. The tornado was initially weak causing light damage in fields, the tornado then rapidly intensified to IF2 strength when it moved north into town causing significant damage to roofs and walls to buildings with power lines and utility poles being significantly bent or collapsed. As the tornado moved into the northern part of town, it collapsed a free-standing wall and debranched trees. The tornado then began moving northeast intensifying to IF3 strength as it debarked and completely debranched many mature pistachio trees. The tornado then weakened to IF2.5 strength as it traveled near the town of Silsile where numerous large trees sustained heavy damage, with many being uprooted, snapped, or debranched. The tornado then impacted the western side of Silsile where there was significant damage done to vegetation and structures, with many structures losing their roofs and walls.

Security camera footage of the tornado near Çangallı, Turkey

The tornado then crossed the border into Turkey, becoming more pronounced and maintaining its significant IF2.5 intensity as it impacted the town of Çangallı, Turkey where masonry buildings were damaged with roofs being heavily damaged, power lines were downed, and a transmission tower collapsed. Pistachio trees in this area also sustained major damage. As the tornado continued on its northeastward path it barely missed the town of İnkılap when the tornado started turning northwest in an attempt to occlude only to fail doing so resulting in the tornado doing a loop in a field near the village. For the next 1.5 km (0.93 mi) of the tornadoes path northwest of Üçdamlar. The tornado began rapidly shrinking, going from almost 800 m (870 yd) wide to only 200 m (220 yd) wide as it was near Çaybeyi that the tornado intensified to IF4 strength as it completely swept three farm buildings off of their foundations with one of them being thrown 100 m (110 yd) being obliterated upon impact. The tornado then also scoured the ground leading to a sandpapering affect on mature pistachio trees causing violent damage. Numerous trees were also denuded with few being completely debarked, and some others being ripped out of the ground and lofted short distances.

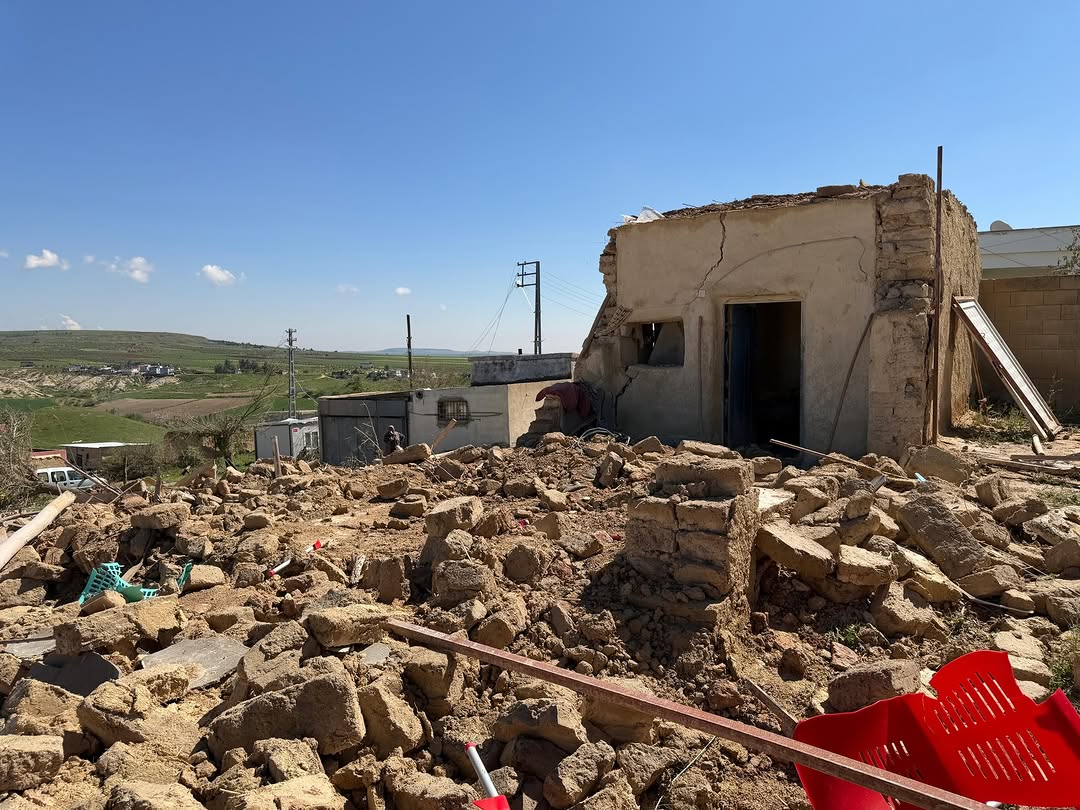
IF3 damage to a masonry house in Akçamezra.

Continuing north, the tornado shrunk again, this time down to 100 m (110 yd) as it impacted the village of Akçamezra, across the village, the tornado destroyed masonry homes, collapsed utility poles, with some trailers/semi-trucks being thrown/overturned along with more structures sustaining significant damage. The core of the narrow IF3 strength tornado showed at the southeastern side of the village, three masonry homes were completely destroyed, but one in particular with 50 cm (20 in) thick walls having ~60% of the structures walls collapsed. A nearby car was also picked up and thrown 15–20 m (16–22 yd) by the tornado as it debarked more trees, destroyed utility poles, and completely destroyed another masonry home. The tornado weakened slightly to IF2.5 strength as the tornado tracked through the eastern part of the village before quickly reintensifying to IF3 strength as it impacted many farmhouses just on the outside of the village. Several farmhouses received major damage with one of them being nearly completely destroyed besides one wall standing, the farmhouse was well constructed with around 30–40 cm (12–16 in) thick walls.

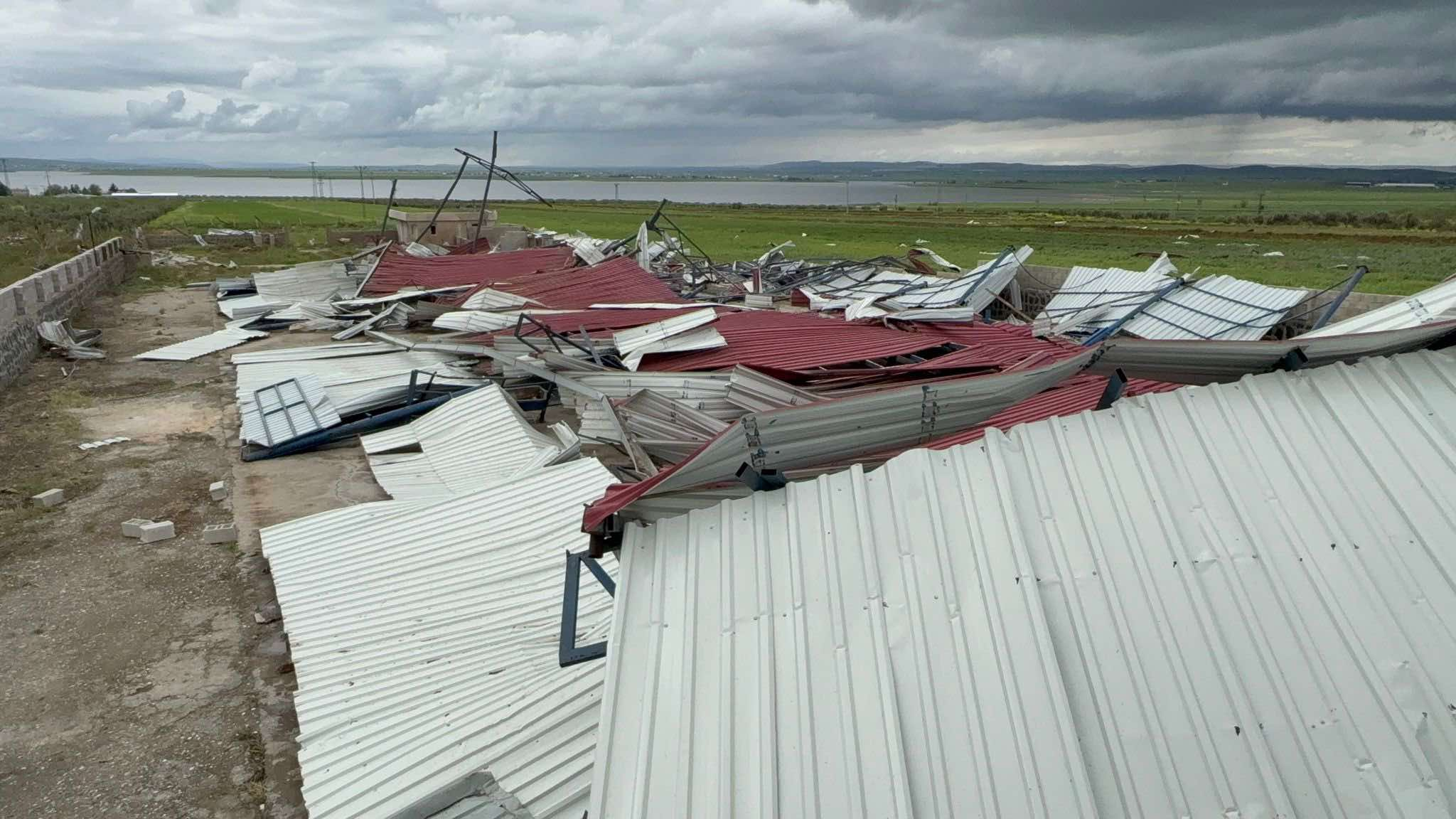
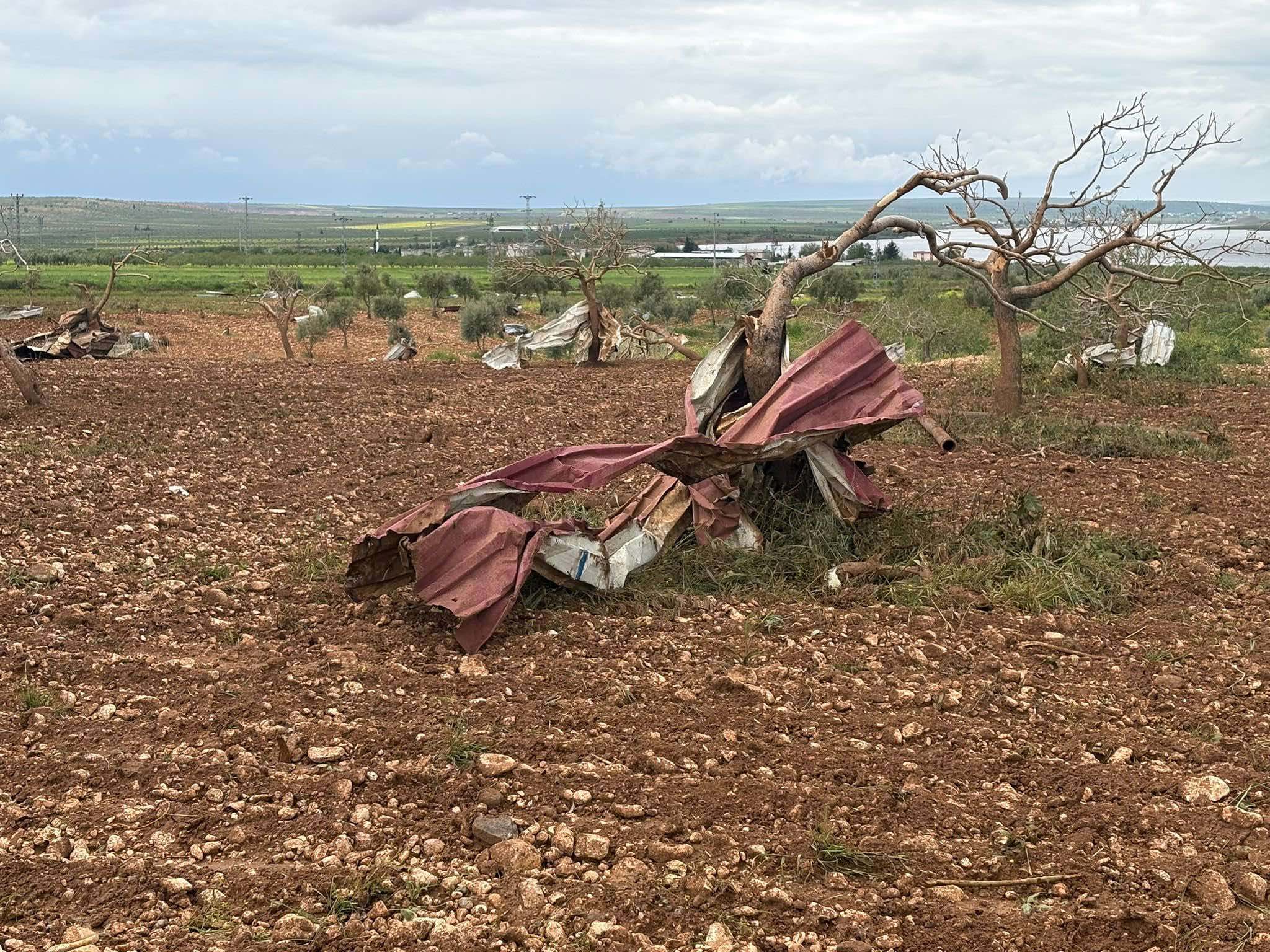
Damage near Kayacık, where a strong metal-frame outbuilding was completely destroyed and nearby pistachio trees were heavily damaged.

The tornado continued, moving through rural areas mainly causing damage to crops before weakening to IF2 strength and moving into the eastern side of Kayacık where it damaged the roofs of farm buildings and crossing a highway. A van driving on the highway was thrown into a nearby field injuring both occupants, the tornado continued in that field weakening again to IF1 intensity as it damaged trees and some more farm building roofs south of Karadibek. Eyewitnesses captured the tornado roping out where it lightly damaged crops and then finally dissipated at 3:40 p.m. TRT over some hills near the village.

The tornado reached a peak width of 790 m (860 yd) and traveled 27.1 km (16.8 mi) in 30 minutes. Along its track, it damaged or destroyed numerous buildings injuring two people.

On September 22, with the help from the European Severe Storm Laboratory (ESSL) and the European Severe Weather Database (ESWD), the original IF3 rating was upgraded to an IF4, with estimated winds speed at 380 km/h (240 mph). The upgrade was based from several areas of extreme debarking and denuding of several mature pistachio trees. Ground scouring was also noted.

== See also ==
- List of European tornadoes and tornado outbreaks
- List of Asian tornadoes in 2026
- 2021 South Moravia tornado - Another IF4 tornado that happened in Europe
- List of Turkey tornadoes
