= Dilek =

Dilek is a Turkish word meaning wish, request or desire. It is used as a feminine given name as well as a noun and may refer to:

== Given name ==
- Dilek Akagün Yılmaz (born 1963), Turkish politician
- Dilek Engin (born 1981), German politician
- Dilek Gürsoy (born 1976), German heart surgeon of Turkish descent
- Dilek Huseyinzadegan, Turkish-American philosopher
- Dilek Kalayci (born 1967), Turkish–German politician
- Dilek Kınık (born 1995), Turkish volleyball player
- Dilek Koçak (born 2005), Turkish female middle distance runner
- Dilek Koçbay (born 1982), Turkish FIFA listed football referee
- Dilek Öztürk (born 2001), Turkish long-distance runner
- Dilek Sabanci (born 1964), Turkish executive and a member of the Sabancı family
- Dilek Serbest (born 1981), Turkish actress and model

== Places ==
- Dilek, Köprüköy
- Dilek, Malatya, a town in the central district of Malatya Province, Turkey
- Dilek, Taşköprü, a village in Turkey
- Dilek Peninsula, a peninsula lying between the districts of Didim and Kuşadası in Aydın Province, western Turkey
- Dilek Peninsula-Büyük Menderes Delta National Park, a national park in Aydın province, Turkey
- Dilek Sabancı Sport Hall, a sports hall in Antalya, Turkey

== Other uses ==
- Dilek Ecza Deposu, fifth largest-pharmaceutical warehouse in Turkey
