= Gürsoy =

Gürsoy is a Turkish surname. It may refer to:

- Bedri Gürsoy (1902–1994), Turkish football player
- Dilek Gürsoy (born 1976), German female heart surgeon of Turkish descent
- Gürhan Gürsoy (born 1987), Turkish professional footballer
- Güven Gürsoy (born 1992), Turkish professional footballer
- Hüseyin Gürsoy (1934–1993), Turkish wrestler
- Nilüfer Gürsoy (1921–2024), Turkish female philologist, politician and memoirist
- Yaprak Gürsoy (born 1978), Turkish female political scientist and associate professor
