= Ovaköy =

Ovaköy can refer to:

- Ovaköy, Köşk
- Ovaköy, Pasinler
