= Gaziler, Kepez =

Gaziler
- Neighbourhood
- Location within Turkey
- Coordinates: 37°00′28″N 30°47′06″E
- Country: Turkey
- Province: Antalya
- District: Kepez
- Population (2025): 3,704
- Time zone: UTC+3 (TRT)

Gaziler is a neighbourhood of the municipality and district of Kepez, Antalya Province, Turkey. Its population is 3,704 (2025).

== Population ==
Historical population
Year	Pop.	±% p.a.
2013	3,197	—
2014	3,360	+5.10%
2015	3,403	+1.28%
2016	3,338	−1.91%
2017	3,280	−1.74%
2018	3,334	+1.65%
2019	3,471	+4.11%
2020	3,558	+2.51%
2021	3,538	−0.56%
2022	3,689	+4.27%
2023	3,846	+4.26%
2024	3,762	−2.18%
2025	3,704	−1.54%
Source: TÜİK
