= Odabaşı, Kepez =

Odabaşı
- Neighbourhood
- Location within Turkey
- Country: Turkey
- Province: Antalya
- District: Kepez
- Population (2025): 1,598
- Time zone: UTC+3 (TRT)

Odabaşı is a neighbourhood of the municipality and district of Kepez, Antalya Province, Turkey. Its population is 1,598 (2025).

== Population ==
Historical population
Year	Pop.	±% p.a.
2013	881	—
2014	896	+1.70%
2015	894	−0.22%
2016	915	+2.35%
2017	952	+4.04%
2018	955	+0.32%
2019	963	+0.84%
2020	981	+1.87%
2021	998	+1.73%
2022	1,080	+8.22%
2023	1,225	+13.43%
2024	1,366	+11.51%
2025	1,598	+16.98%
Source: TÜİK
