= Kızıllı, Kepez =

Kızıllı
- Neighbourhood
- Location within Turkey
- Coordinates: 37°06′45″N 30°42′39″E
- Country: Turkey
- Province: Antalya
- District: Kepez
- Population (2025): 1,403
- Time zone: UTC+3 (TRT)

Kızıllı is a neighbourhood in the District of Kepez, Antalya Province, Turkey. Its population is 1,403 (2025).

== Population ==
Historical population
| Year | Pop. | ±% p.a. |
|---|---|---|
| 2013 | 1,113 | — |
| 2014 | 1,107 | −0.54% |
| 2015 | 1,111 | +0.36% |
| 2016 | 1,140 | +2.61% |
| 2017 | 1,161 | +1.84% |
| 2018 | 1,257 | +8.27% |
| 2019 | 1,278 | +1.67% |
| 2020 | 1,287 | +0.70% |
| 2021 | 1,338 | +3.96% |
| 2022 | 1,352 | +1.05% |
| 2023 | 1,354 | +0.15% |
| 2024 | 1,391 | +2.73% |
| 2025 | 1,403 | +0.86% |
Source: TÜİK
