= Başköy, Kepez =

Başköy
- Neighbourhood
- Location within Turkey
- Coordinates: 37°02′51″N 30°39′10″E
- Country: Turkey
- Province: Antalya
- District: Kepez
- Population (2025): 863
- Time zone: UTC+3 (TRT)

Başköy is a neighbourhood of the municipality and district of Kepez, Antalya Province, Turkey. Its population is 863 (2025).

== Population ==
Historical population
Year	Pop.	±% p.a.
2007	458	—
2008	483	+5.46%
2009	554	+14.70%
2010	570	+2.89%
2011	571	+0.18%
2012	580	+1.58%
2013	847	+46.03%
2014	760	−10.27%
2015	696	−8.42%
2016	662	−4.89%
2017	623	−5.89%
2018	735	+17.98%
2019	761	+3.54%
2020	767	+0.79%
2021	756	−1.43%
2022	766	+1.32%
2023	864	+12.79%
2024	853	−1.27%
2025	863	+1.17%
Source: TÜİK
