= Nauloi =

Town of ancient Cilicia

Coordinates: 36°28′30″N 32°07′01″E

Nauloi was a town of ancient Cilicia.

Its site is tentatively located near Mahmutlar, in Asiatic Turkey.
