= Duacı, Kepez =

Duacı
- Neighbourhood
- Location within Turkey
- Coordinates: 36°58′N 30°39′E
- Country: Turkey
- Province: Antalya
- District: Kepez
- Population (2025): 3,015
- Time zone: UTC+3 (TRT)

Duacı is a neighbourhood of the municipality and district of Kepez, Antalya Province, Turkey. Its population is 3,015 (2025). The village is inhabited by Tahtacı.

== Population ==
Historical population
Year	Pop.	±% p.a.
2013	2,010	—
2014	2,057	+2.34%
2015	2,137	+3.89%
2016	2,152	+0.70%
2017	2,252	+4.65%
2018	2,318	+2.93%
2019	2,458	+6.04%
2020	2,539	+3.30%
2021	2,682	+5.63%
2022	2,837	+5.78%
2023	2,924	+3.07%
2024	2,976	+1.78%
2025	3,015	+1.31%
Source: TÜİK
