= Varsak =

Varsak may refer to:

- Varsak (tribe), Turkmen tribe
- Varsak Karşıyaka, district of Antalya
- Yatagan, type of knife
