= Kirişçiler, Kepez =

Kirişçiler
- Neighbourhood
- Location within Turkey
- Coordinates: 37°03′N 30°42′E
- Country: Turkey
- Province: Antalya
- District: Kepez
- Population (2025): 1,429
- Time zone: UTC+3 (TRT)

Kirişçiler is a neighbourhood of the municipality and district of Kepez, Antalya Province, Turkey. Its population is 1,429 (2025).

== Population ==
Historical population
Year	Pop.	±% p.a.
2013	775	—
2014	767	−1.03%
2015	765	−0.26%
2016	821	+7.32%
2017	860	+4.75%
2018	1,037	+20.58%
2019	1,048	+1.06%
2020	1,079	+2.96%
2021	1,120	+3.80%
2022	1,207	+7.77%
2023	1,408	+16.65%
2024	1,450	+2.98%
2025	1,429	−1.45%
Source: TÜİK
