= Çamlıca, Kepez =

Çamlıca
- Neighbourhood
- Location within Turkey
- Coordinates: 37.0502°N 30.7380°E
- Country: Turkey
- Province: Antalya
- District: Kepez
- Population (2025): 445
- Time zone: UTC+3 (TRT)

Çamlıca is a neighbourhood of the municipality and district of Kepez, Antalya Province, Turkey. Its population is 445 (2025).

== Population ==
Historical population
Year	Pop.	±% p.a.
2013	373	—
2014	385	+3.22%
2015	361	−6.23%
2016	384	+6.37%
2017	396	+3.12%
2018	442	+11.62%
2019	405	−8.37%
2020	413	+1.98%
2021	424	+2.66%
2022	416	−1.89%
2023	439	+5.53%
2024	439	+0.00%
2025	445	+1.37%
Source: TÜİK
