= Altıeylül, Köşk =

Village in Turkey

Altıeylül
- Neighbourhood
- Location in Turkey
- Coordinates: 37°50′41″N 28°04′03″E
- Country: Turkey
- Province: Altıeylül
- District: Köşk
- Population (2024): 1,865
- Time zone: UTC+3 (TRT)

Altıeylül is a neighbourhood in the municipality and district of Köşk, Aydın Province, Turkey. Its population is 1,865 (2024).
