= Menteşeler, Köşk =

Menteşeler
- Neighbourhood
- Location in Turkey Menteşeler (Turkey Aegean)
- Coordinates: 37°58′10″N 28°05′30″E
- Country: Turkey
- Province: Aydın
- District: Köşk
- Population (2022): 194
- Time zone: UTC+3 (TRT)

Menteşeler is a neighbourhood in the municipality and district of Köşk, Aydın Province, Turkey. Its population is 194 (2022).
