= Cumadere, Köşk =

Cumadere
- Neighbourhood
- Location in Turkey Cumadere (Turkey Aegean)
- Coordinates: 37°54′N 28°01′E
- Country: Turkey
- Province: Aydın
- District: Köşk
- Population (2022): 177
- Time zone: UTC+3 (TRT)

Cumadere is a neighbourhood in the municipality and district of Köşk, Aydın Province, Turkey. Its population is 177 (2022).
