= Karatepe, Köşk =

Karatepe
- Neighbourhood
- Location in Turkey Karatepe (Turkey Aegean)
- Coordinates: 37.9333°N 28.0833°E
- Country: Turkey
- Province: Aydın
- District: Köşk
- Population (2022): 391
- Time zone: UTC+3 (TRT)

Karatepe is a neighbourhood in the municipality and district of Köşk, Aydın Province, Turkey. Its population is 391 (2022).
