= Ketenyeri, Köşk =

Ketenyeri
- Neighbourhood
- Location in Turkey Ketenyeri (Turkey Aegean)
- Coordinates: 37°58′30″N 28°06′0″E
- Country: Turkey
- Province: Aydın
- District: Köşk
- Population (2022): 290
- Time zone: UTC+3 (TRT)

Ketenyeri is a neighbourhood in the municipality and district of Köşk, Aydın Province, Turkey. Its population is 290 (2022).
