= Baklaköy, Köşk =

Baklaköy
- Neighbourhood
- Location in Turkey Baklaköy (Turkey Aegean)
- Coordinates: 37.8667°N 28.0667°E
- Country: Turkey
- Province: Aydın
- District: Köşk
- Population (2022): 283
- Time zone: UTC+3 (TRT)

Baklaköy is a neighbourhood in the municipality and district of Köşk, Aydın Province, Turkey. Its population is 283 (2022).
