= Kepez =

Kepez may refer to:

- Kepez, Antalya, an intracity district of Antalya, Turkey
  - Kepez Belediyesi B.K., sports club based in the district
- Kepez, Akçadağ, a town in Malatya Province. Includes Kürecik, home for Kürecik Radar Station
- Kepez, Çanakkale, a town in Çanakkale Province, Turkey
- Kepez, Silifke, a village in Silifke district of Mersin Province
- Kepez, Sındırgı, a village
