= Beyköy, Köşk =

Beyköy
- Neighbourhood
- Location in Turkey Beyköy (Turkey Aegean)
- Coordinates: 37.8532°N 28.0195°E
- Country: Turkey
- Province: Aydın
- District: Köşk
- Population (2022): 867
- Time zone: UTC+3 (TRT)

Beyköy is a neighbourhood in the municipality and district of Köşk, Aydın Province, Turkey. Its population is 867 (2022).
