= Gökkiriş, Köşk =

Gökkiriş
- Neighbourhood
- Location in Turkey Gökkiriş (Turkey Aegean)
- Coordinates: 37°58′41″N 28°04′34″E
- Country: Turkey
- Province: Aydın
- District: Köşk
- Population (2022): 681
- Time zone: UTC+3 (TRT)

Gökkiriş is a neighbourhood in the municipality and district of Köşk, Aydın Province, Turkey. Its population is 681 (2022).
