= Ilıdağ, Köşk =

Ilıdağ
- Neighbourhood
- Location in Turkey Ilıdağ (Turkey Aegean)
- Coordinates: 37°56′38″N 28°02′31″E
- Country: Turkey
- Province: Aydın
- District: Köşk
- Population (2022): 1,534
- Time zone: UTC+3 (TRT)

Ilıdağ is a neighbourhood in the municipality and district of Köşk, Aydın Province, Turkey. Its population is 1,534 (2022).
