= Koçak, Köşk =

Koçak
- Neighbourhood
- Country: Turkey
- Province: Aydın
- District: Köşk
- Population (2022): 379
- Time zone: UTC+3 (TRT)

Koçak is a neighbourhood in the municipality and district of Köşk, Aydın Province, Turkey. Its population is 379 (2022).
