= Kızılcayer, Köşk =

Kızılcayer
- Neighbourhood
- Location in Turkey Kızılcayer (Turkey Aegean)
- Coordinates: 37°53′31″N 28°02′56″E
- Country: Turkey
- Province: Aydın
- District: Köşk
- Population (2022): 269
- Time zone: UTC+3 (TRT)

Kızılcayer is a neighbourhood in the municipality and district of Köşk, Aydın Province, Turkey. Its population is 269 (2022).
