= Yavuzköy, Köşk =

Yavuzköy
- Neighbourhood
- Country: Turkey
- Province: Aydın
- District: Köşk
- Population (2022): 662
- Time zone: UTC+3 (TRT)

Yavuzköy is a neighbourhood in the municipality and district of Köşk, Aydın Province, Turkey. Its population is 662 (2022).
