= Başçayır, Köşk =

Başçayır
- Neighbourhood
- Location in Turkey Başçayır (Turkey Aegean)
- Coordinates: 37.9558°N 28.0733°E
- Country: Turkey
- Province: Aydın
- District: Köşk
- Population (2022): 1,359
- Time zone: UTC+3 (TRT)

Başçayır is a neighbourhood in the municipality and district of Köşk, Aydın Province, Turkey. Its population is 1,359 (2022).
