= Kızılcaköy, Köşk =

Kızılcaköy
- Neighbourhood
- Location in Turkey Kızılcaköy (Turkey Aegean)
- Coordinates: 37°57′50″N 28°06′25″E
- Country: Turkey
- Province: Aydın
- District: Köşk
- Population (2022): 695
- Time zone: UTC+3 (TRT)

Kızılcaköy is a neighbourhood in the municipality and district of Köşk, Aydın Province, Turkey. Its population is 695 (2022).
