= Çarşı, Köşk =

Village in Turkey

Çarşı
- Neighbourhood
- Location in Turkey Çarşı (Turkey Aegean)
- Coordinates: 37°51′34″N 28°03′42″E
- Country: Turkey
- Province: Aydın
- District: Köşk
- Population (2024): 4,667
- Time zone: UTC+3 (TRT)

Çarşı is a neighbourhood in the municipality and district of Köşk, Aydın Province, Turkey. Its population is 4,667 (2024).
