= Soğukkuyu, Köşk =

Village in Turkey

Soğukkuyu
- Neighbourhood
- Location in Turkey Soğukkuyu (Turkey Aegean)
- Coordinates: 37°51′27″N 28°02′56″E
- Country: Turkey
- Province: Aydın
- District: Köşk
- Population (2024): 3,373
- Time zone: UTC+3 (TRT)

Soğukkuyu is a neighbourhood in the municipality and district of Köşk, Aydın Province, Turkey. Its population is 3,373 (2024).
