= Cumayanı, Köşk =

Cumayanı
- Neighbourhood
- Location in Turkey Cumayanı (Turkey Aegean)
- Coordinates: 37.984°N 28.101°E
- Country: Turkey
- Province: Aydın
- District: Köşk
- Population (2022): 532
- Time zone: UTC+3 (TRT)

Cumayanı is a neighbourhood in the municipality and district of Köşk, Aydın Province, Turkey. Its population is 532 (2022).
