= Akçaköy, Köşk =

Akçaköy
- Neighbourhood
- Location in Turkey Akçaköy (Turkey Aegean)
- Coordinates: 37.9636°N 28.0225°E
- Country: Turkey
- Province: Aydın
- District: Köşk
- Population (2022): 2,035
- Time zone: UTC+3 (TRT)

Akçaköy is a neighbourhood in the municipality and district of Köşk, Aydın Province, Turkey. Its population is 2,035 (2022).
