= Mezeköy, Köşk =

Mezeköy
- Neighbourhood
- Location in Turkey Mezeköy (Turkey Aegean)
- Coordinates: 37°54′N 28°03′E
- Country: Turkey
- Province: Aydın
- District: Köşk
- Population (2022): 319
- Time zone: UTC+3 (TRT)

Mezeköy is a neighbourhood in the municipality and district of Köşk, Aydın Province, Turkey. Its population is 319 (2022).
