= Varsak Karşıyaka =

- Neighbourhood
- Location within Turkey
- Coordinates: 36°58′40″N 30°42′50″E
- Country: Turkey
- Province: Antalya
- District: Kepez
- Population (2025): 14,274
- Time zone: UTC+3 (TRT)

Varsak Karşıyaka is a neighbourhood of the municipality and district of Kepez, Antalya Province, Turkey. Its population is 14,274 (2025). Varsak was an independent municipality until it was merged into the new district of Kepez in 2008.

== Population ==
Historical population
Year	Pop.	±% p.a.
2007	11,939	—
2008	12,729	+6.62%
2009	13,250	+4.09%
2010	14,476	+9.25%
2011	15,972	+10.33%
2012	17,491	+9.51%
2013	19,263	+10.13%
2014	21,371	+10.94%
2015	23,126	+8.21%
2016	24,939	+7.84%
2017	27,016	+8.33%
2018	10,292	−61.90%
2019	10,549	+2.50%
2020	11,285	+6.98%
2021	11,776	+4.35%
2022	12,258	+4.09%
2023	12,798	+4.41%
2024	13,517	+5.62%
2025	14,274	+5.60%
Source: TÜİK
