= Serdaroğlu, Köşk =

Village in Turkey

Serdaroğlu
- Neighbourhood
- Location in Turkey Serdaroğlu (Turkey Aegean)
- Coordinates: 37°50′25″N 28°02′46″E
- Country: Turkey
- Province: Aydın
- District: Köşk
- Population (2024): 2,951
- Time zone: UTC+3 (TRT)

Serdaroğlu is a neighbourhood in the municipality and district of Köşk, Aydın Province, Turkey. Its population is 2,951 (2024).
