= Değirmenli =

Değirmenli is the adjectival form of the Turkish word değirmen for "mill", and therefore literally "with mills". It may refer to the following places in Turkey:

- Değirmenli, Ardahan
- Değirmenli, Çat
- Değirmenli, Çermik
- Değirmenli, Ceyhan
- Değirmenli, Dicle
- Değirmenli, İspir
- Değirmenli, Manavgat

== See also ==
- Değirmencik (disambiguation)
- Değirmendere (disambiguation)
