= Çiftlikköy, Köşk =

Çiftlikköy
- Neighbourhood
- Location in Turkey Çiftlikköy (Turkey Aegean)
- Coordinates: 37°50′02″N 28°00′54″E
- Country: Turkey
- Province: Aydın
- District: Köşk
- Population (2022): 1,479
- Time zone: UTC+3 (TRT)

Çiftlikköy is a neighbourhood in the municipality and district of Köşk, Aydın Province, Turkey. Its population is 1,479 (2022).
