= Güzelköy, Köşk =

Güzelköy
- Neighbourhood
- Country: Turkey
- Province: Aydın
- District: Köşk
- Population (2022): 326
- Time zone: UTC+3 (TRT)

Güzelköy is a neighbourhood in the municipality and district of Köşk, Aydın Province, Turkey. Its population is 326 (2022).
