= Uzundere, Köşk =

Uzundere
- Neighbourhood
- Location in Turkey Uzundere (Turkey Aegean)
- Coordinates: 37.9167°N 28.0667°E
- Country: Turkey
- Province: Aydın
- District: Köşk
- Population (2022): 592
- Time zone: UTC+3 (TRT)

Uzundere is a neighbourhood in the municipality and district of Köşk, Aydın Province, Turkey. Its population is 592 (2022).
