= Değirmencik =

Değirmencik may refer to the following places in Turkey:

- Değirmencik, Bayburt
- Değirmencik, Biga
- Değirmencik, Daday
- Değirmencik, Nusaybin
