= Kayacık =

Kayacık may refer to:

== People ==
- Oya Kayacık (1938–2020), Turkish nurse

== Places in Turkey ==
- Kayacık, Adıyaman
- Kayacık, Amasya
- Kayacık, Çavdır
- Kayacık, Ezine
- Kayacık, İliç
- Kayacık, Kestel
- Kayacık, Kulp
- Kayacık, Yapraklı
- Kayacık Dam
