= Dilek Huseyinzadegan =

American philosopher

- Awards: DAAD

Education
- Education: DePaul University (PhD), Bogazici University (BA)

Philosophical work
- Era: 21st-century philosophy
- Region: Western philosophy
- Institutions: Emory University
- Main interests: political philosophy

Dilek Huseyinzadegan is a Turkish-American philosopher and an associate professor of philosophy at Emory University. She is known for her works on political philosophy.

== Books ==
- Kant’s Nonideal Theory of Politics, Northwestern University Press 2019, ISBN 978-0-8101-3988-6
