= Değirmencik, Nusaybin =

Village in Mardin Province, Turkey

Değirmencik
- Neighbourhood
- Location in Turkey
- Coordinates: 37°9′11″N 41°37′11″E
- Country: Turkey
- Province: Mardin
- District: Nusaybin
- Population (2021): 0
- Time zone: UTC+3 (TRT)

Değirmencik (Kurdish: Qolika; Syriac: Qūlḫān) is a neighbourhood in the municipality and district of Nusaybin, Mardin Province in Turkey. It was populated by Yazidi Kurds of the Dasikan tribe. The village is unpopulated as of 2021.

== History ==
Qūlḫān (today called Değirmencik) was historically inhabited by Syriac Orthodox Christians. In the Syriac Orthodox patriarchal register of dues of 1870, it was recorded that the village had twelve households, who paid sixty-four dues, and it did not have a church or a priest.

== Demography ==
Population
Year	Pop.	±%
1935	135	—
1985	341	+152.6%
1990	114	−66.6%
2000	0	−100.0%
2012	0	0.00%
2021	0	0.00%

== Bibliography ==
- Bcheiry, Iskandar (2009). The Syriac Orthodox Patriarchal Register of Dues of 1870: An Unpublished Historical Document from the Late Ottoman Period. Gorgias Press.
- Kreyenbroek, Philip G. (2009). Yezidism in Europe: Different Generations Speak about Their Religion. Otto Harrassowitz Verlag. ISBN 9783447060608.
- Sediyani, İbrahim (2009). Adını arayan coğrafya. Özedönüş Yayınları. ISBN 9786054296002.
- Tan, Altan (2018). Turabidin'den Berriye'ye. Aşiretler - Dinler - Diller - Kültürler (in Turkish). Pak Ajans Yayincilik Turizm Ve Diş Ticaret Limited şirketi. ISBN 9789944360944.
