= Köşk =

- District and municipality
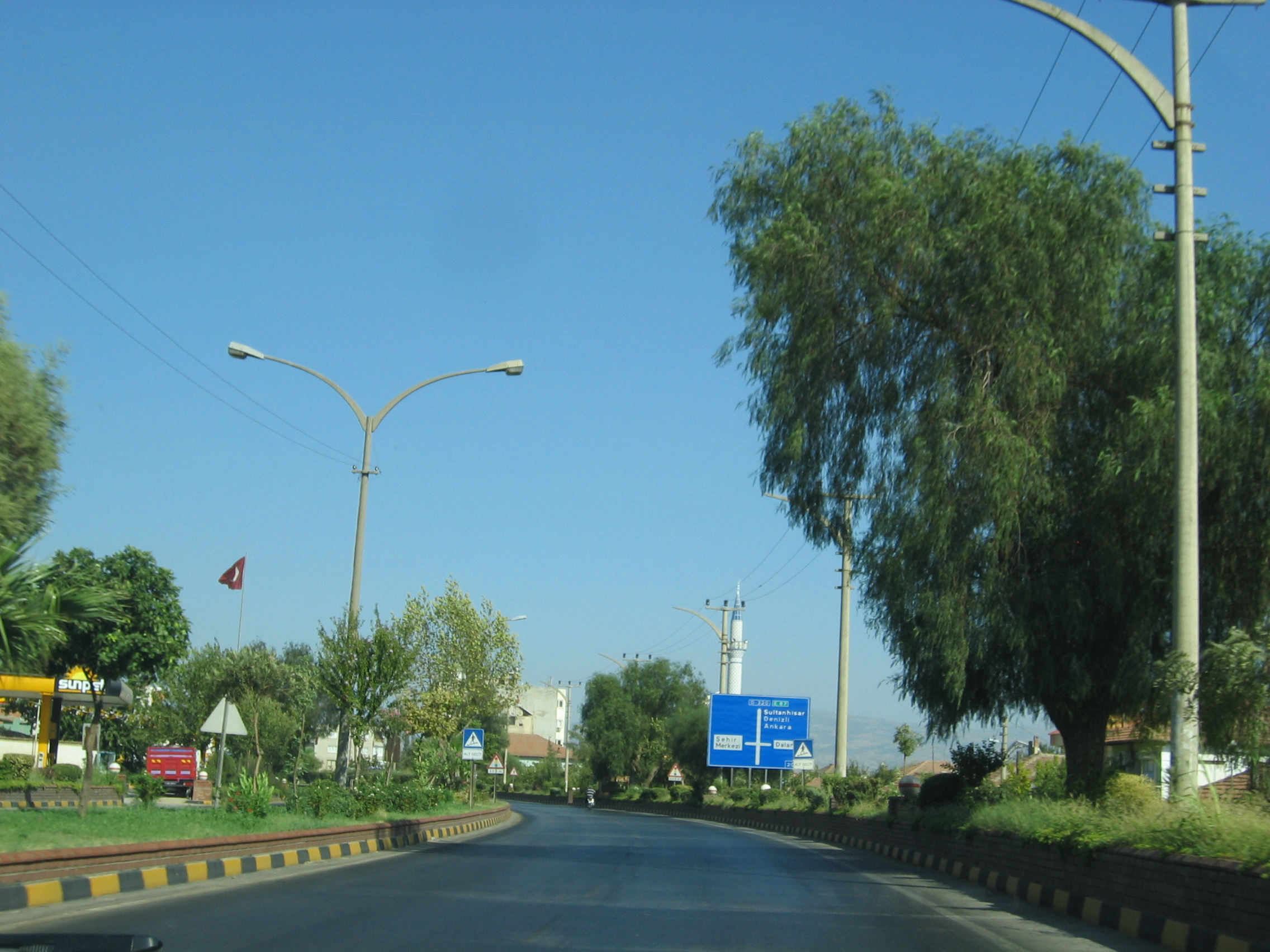

- Map showing Köşk District in Aydın Province

- Location within Turkey Location within Turkey Aegean
- Coordinates: 37°51′12″N 28°3′6″E
- Country: Turkey
- Province: Aydın

Government
  - Mayor: Nuri Güler (AKP)
- Area: 187 km^{2} (72 sq mi)
- Population (2022): 28,235
  - Density: 151/km^{2} (391/sq mi)
- Time zone: UTC+3 (TRT)
- Postal code: 09570
- Area code: 0256
- Website: www.kosk.bel.tr

Köşk is a municipality and district of Aydın Province, Turkey. Its area is 187 km^{2}, and its population is 28,235 (2022). "Köşk" is a noun in Turkish and refers to an ornate wooden mansion, smaller than a palace.

== Composition ==
There are 28 neighbourhoods in Köşk District:

- Ahatlar
- Akçaköy
- Altıeylül
- Baklaköy
- Başçayır
- Beyköy
- Çarşı
- Çiftlikköy
- Cumadere
- Cumayanı
- Gökkiriş
- Gündoğan
- Güzelköy
- Ilıdağ
- Karatepe
- Ketenyeri
- Kıran
- Kızılcaköy
- Kızılcayer
- Koçak
- Menteşeler
- Mezeköy
- Ovaköy
- Sarıçam
- Serdaroğlu
- Soğukkuyu
- Uzundere
- Yavuzköy
