= Yaprak Gürsoy =

Turkish researcher

- Born: 1978 (age 47–48); Istanbul, Turkey
- Education: University of Virginia
- Occupation: Political Scientist
- Employer(s): London School of Economics, United Kingdom
- Awards: (BAGEP) Young Scientist Award
- Website: Yaprak Gursoy website

Yaprak Gürsoy is a Professor of European Politics and the Chair of Contemporary Turkish Studies at the London School of Economics. Prior to joining the LSE she was a Senior Lecturer and the Undergraduate Programme Director of Politics and International Relations at Aston University, Birmingham. She previously worked as an associate professor in the Department of International Relations at the Istanbul Bilgi University and a senior member of the St Antony's College, Oxford University. Professor Gürsoy is also co-founder and co-convenor of The Turkish Politics Specialist Group of PSA (Political Studies Association).

Along with being the vice-president of the International Political Science Association Research Committee on Armed Forces and Society, she is also the assistant editor of the Turkish journal Uluslararası Ilişkiler.

Yaprak Gürsoy received her PhD degree in Comparative Politics from the Woodrow Wilson Department of Politics at the University of Virginia. She has three books and more than twenty articles published in academic journals like Political Science Quarterly, Democratization, South European Society and Politics, Turkish Studies and the Journal of Modern Greek Studies.

== Awards ==
Gürsoy received the prestigious the Science Academy Society of Turkey Young Scientist Award (BAGEP) which encourages young academics with an award and financial grant to give them opportunity to advance their studies in 2016. Gürsoy was also one of the winners of LSE Excellence in Education Award 2022, designed to support the School’s aspiration of creating ‘a culture where excellence in teaching is valued and rewarded on a level with excellence in research’.

== Works ==
Include:

- Between Military Rule and Democracy: Regime Consolidation in Greece, Turkey, and Beyond (University of Michigan Press, 2017, ISBN 978-0-472-12299-8)
- "Emotions and Narratives of the Spirit of Gallipoli: Turkey’s Collective Identity and Status in International Relations," British Journal of Middle Eastern Studies, Online First (April 2022): 1-20.
- "Anti-Populist Coups d’état in the Twenty-first Century: Reasons, Dynamics and Consequences," Third World Quarterly, Vol. 42, No. 4 (2021): 793-81.
- "Moving Beyond European and Latin American Typologies: The Peculiarities of AKP’s Populism in Turkey," Journal of Contemporary Asia, Vol. 51, No. 1 (January 2021): 157-178.
- "Reconsidering Britain’s Soft Power: Lessons from the Perceptions of the Turkish Political Elite," Cambridge Review of International Affairs, Online First (October 2020): 1-19.
- “The 15 July 2016 Failed Coup and the Security Sector”, Routledge Handbook on Turkish Politics, edited by Alpaslan Özerdem and Matthew Whiting (Routledge, 2019), 284-295.
- “Turkey”, The Handbook of European Defence Policies and Armed Forces, edited by Hugo Meijer and Marco Wyss (Oxford: Oxford University Press, 2018), 157-178.
- “Turkey is facing its own coronavirus crisis – so why is it sending medical supplies to the UK?,” The Conversation, 22 April 2020.
- “Turkish Populism as a ‘Theory-Reconstructing’ Case Study,” LSE Euro Crisis Blog, 11 December 2019.
- “Why would a Third Country Root for Soft Brexit? Views and Lessons from Turkey,” The Foreign Policy Centre, 29 January 2019.
- “Turkey in and out of NATO? An Instance of a Turbulent Alliance with Western Institutions,” (with İlke Toygur), Royal Institute of Elcano ARI 73/2018, 11 June 2018.
- “The Recent Crisis between Greece and Turkey: Two NATO Allies on the Brink of War, Again,” The Foreign Policy Centre, 24 April 2018.
- "Brexit: Türkiye-Birleşik Krallık-AB İlişkilerinde Siyasi ve Ekonomik Riskler ve Fırsatlar," (Brexit: Political and Economic Risks and Opportunities in Turkish-UK-EU Relations) Dış Ekonomik İlişkiler Kurulu (DEIK), September 2019.
- "Brexit and the UK-Turkey Relationship,” Renewing and Rethinking Bilateralism after Brexit, edited by Andrew Glencross, Aston Centre for Europe, July 2019.
