= Ahatlar, Köşk =

Ahatlar
- Neighbourhood
- Location in Turkey Ahatlar (Turkey Aegean)
- Coordinates: 37°59′10″N 28°5′40″E
- Country: Turkey
- Province: Aydın
- District: Köşk
- Population (2022): 492
- Time zone: UTC+3 (TRT)

Ahatlar is a neighbourhood in the municipality and district of Köşk, Aydın Province, Turkey. Its population is 492 (2022).
