= Arkum =

- Neighbourhood
- Location in Turkey
- Coordinates: 36°21′N 34°03′E
- Country: Turkey
- Province: Mersin
- District: Silifke
- Elevation: 2 m (6.6 ft)
- Population (2022): 1,737
- Time zone: UTC+3 (TRT)

Arkum is a neighbourhood in the municipality and district of Silifke, Mersin Province, Turkey. Its population is 1,737 (2022). Before the 2013 reorganisation, it was a town (belde).

It is in the alluvial plain at the east of Göksu River. In the vicinity of Arkum, the Mediterranean Sea coast runs from north to south and is about 2 kilometres (1.2 mi) from Arkum, so the town may be considered as a coastal town. Towns Atakent and Atayurt are to the north and Silifke is to the west. Distance to Silifke is about 10 kilometres (6.2 mi) and distance to Mersin is about 75 kilometres (47 mi).
