= Taşkesen =

Taşkesen may refer to:

- Taşkesen, Devrek
- Taşkesen, Bayburt
- Taşkesen, Keban
