= Dilek Engin =

German politician (born 1981)

- Engin in 2026

Member of the Landtag of North Rhine-Westphalia
- Incumbent
- Assumed office 1 June 2022
- Preceded by: Andreas Bialas
- Constituency: Wuppertal II

Personal details
- Born: 19 July 1981 (age 45)
- Party: Social Democratic Party (since 2012)

Dilek Engin (born 19 July 1981) is a German politician serving as a member of the Landtag of North Rhine-Westphalia since 2022. She has served as education policy spokesperson of the Social Democratic Party group in the Landtag since 2022.
