= Dilek Gürsoy =

Turco-German cardiac surgeon

- Born: 1976 (age 49–50); Neuss, Germany
- Education: University of Düsseldorf
- Occupation: Surgeon
- Known for: First female physician in Europe to implant artificial heart
- Medical career
- Field: Cardiothoracic surgery
- Awards: "Physician of the Year 2019" by German Medical Club

Dilek Gürsoy (born 1976) is a German heart surgeon of Turkish descent. In 2012, she became the first female surgeon in Europe to implant an artificial heart.

== Early life ==
Dilek Gürsoy was born in Neuss in 1976 to parents, who emigrated in 1969 from Fatsa, Ordu in Turkey to work in Germany as Gastarbeiter. One of her two brothers died during childhood. Her father died from sudden cardiac death as she was ten years old. Her mother Zeynep was an assembly-line worker at Pierburg plant. Dilek was raised by her mother, who had taught herself to read and write because her family did not send her to school. During her preschool time in the kindergarten, she learned the German language, and met a German couple, who served as a guide in the German world and her hometown's society. She was schooled in Martin-Luther-Grundschule for primary i, and then completed the high school at Quirinus-Gymnasium in Neuss. She was the first in her family to go to university, where she focused on cardiovascular surgery. Her future professional career has been always surgery since her childhood.

== Medical career ==
After graduation from University of Düsseldorf, she worked as assistant physician, specialist and assistant medical director. In addition, she has worked with Reiner Körfer in Bad Oeynhausen, Essen and Duisburg to develop a new type of artificial heart without wires and external power sources. In 2017, she worked in Bremen. Since March 2019, she works as a consultant surgeon and as the director of LVAD program at the cardiac surgery department at the Helios-clinic in Siegburg.

=== Recognition ===
After becoming curious about Gürsoy's work, Chancellor of Germany Angela Merkel invited her to a conversation on 21 September 2017. She was named to receive the award "Medizinerin des Jahres 2019" ("Physician of the Year 2019") by the German Medical Club on 18 November 2019 for her achievement as the first female physician in Europe to implant an artificial heart. She was honored as one of the BBC 100 Women in December 2022.

== Private life ==
Gürsoy enjoys to live in her hometown Neuss. She returns to hometown on weekends when she has to work in another city.

She is a football fan of Borussia Mönchengladbach, is a member of the club and holds a season ticket.
