= Ayyasha =

Ayyasha عياشة
- Village
- Location in Syria
- Coordinates: 36°40′03″N 37°31′17″E
- Country: Syria
- Governorate: Aleppo
- District: al-Bab
- Subdistrict: al-Rai

Population (2004)
  - Total: 468
- Time zone: UTC+3 (AST)
- Geocode: C1270

Ayyasha (Arabic: عياشة; Turkish: Ayaşa) is a village in northern Aleppo Governorate, in northwestern Syria. Located along the border with Turkey, it is administratively part of Nahiya al-Rai in al-Bab District. In the 2004 census, Ayyasha had a population of 468.

On May 3, 2026, a strong, violent IF4 tornado caused damage in and around the village.
