= Mahmutlar =

- Neighbourhood
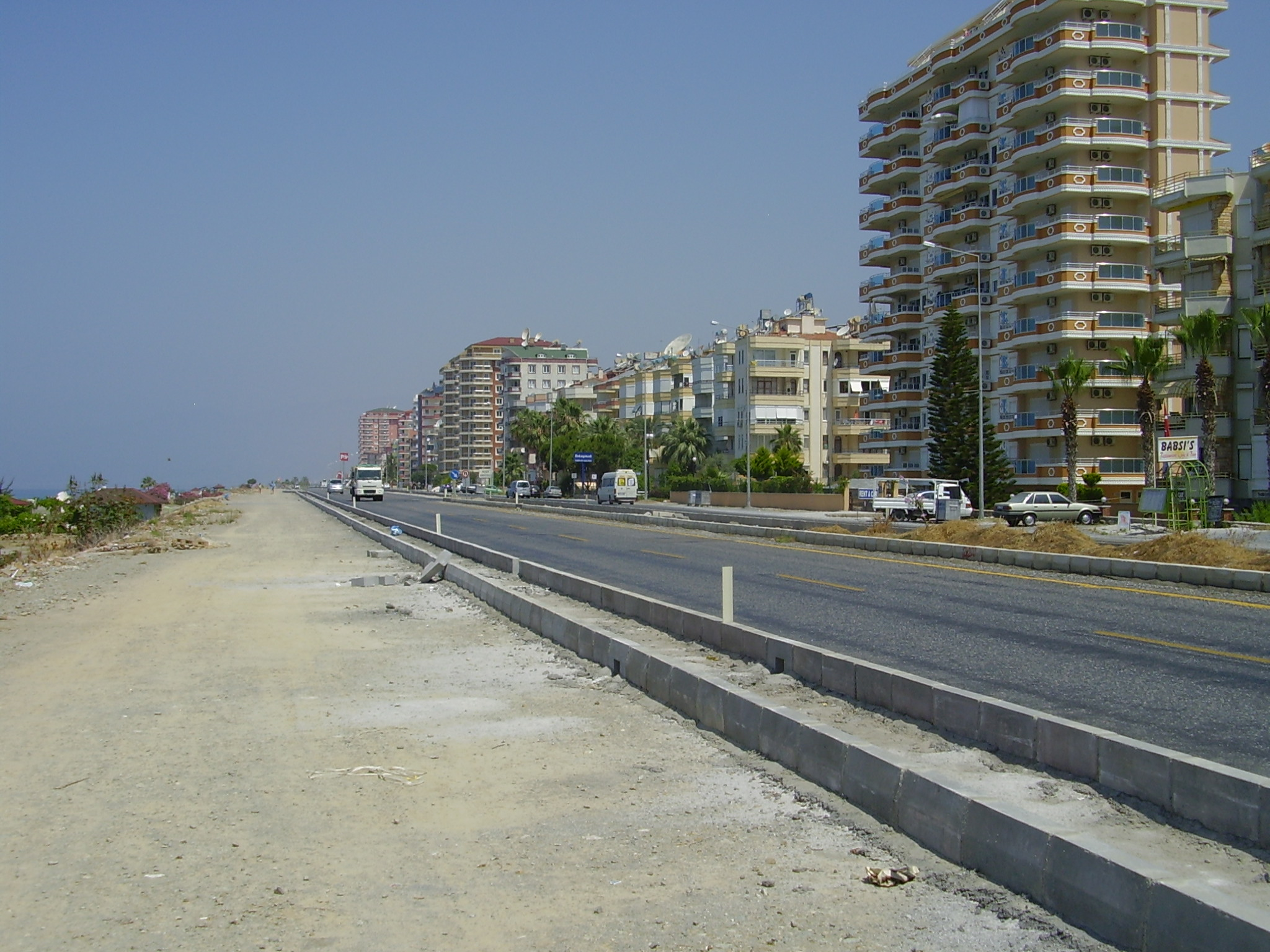

- Location within Turkey
- Coordinates: 36°29′34″N 32°05′57″E
- Country: Turkey
- Province: Antalya
- District: Alanya
- Population (2022): 53,034
- Time zone: UTC+3 (TRT)

Mahmutlar is a neighbourhood of the municipality and district of Alanya, Antalya Province, Turkey. Its population is 53,034 (2022). It lies 10 km east of Alanya. Before the 2013 reorganisation, it was a town (belde). The town has been transformed by the building of holiday homes and apartments for European tourists. Roads and services have been improved to cater for the growing tourist industry.
