= Kayacık, Adıyaman =

Village in Adıyaman Province, Turkey

Kayacık
- Village
- Location within Turkey
- Coordinates: 37.704°N 38.099°E
- Country: Turkey
- Province: Adıyaman
- District: Adıyaman
- Population (2021): 205
- Time zone: UTC+3 (TRT)

Kayacık (Kurdish: Qeyecix) is a village in the Adıyaman District, Adıyaman Province, Turkey. It is populated by Kurds of the Reşwan tribe and had a population of 205 in 2021.
