= Kepez, Antalya =

District of Antalya, Turkey

Kepez
- District and municipality
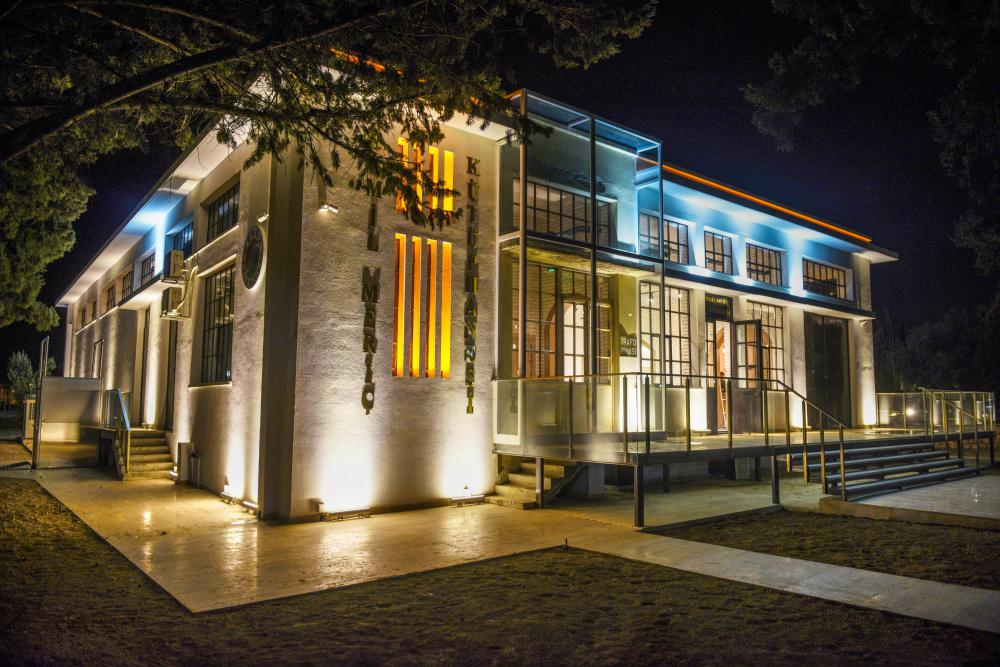
- Cemil Meriç Library in Dokuma Park at night

- Logo

- Map showing Kepez District in Antalya Province

- Location within Turkey
- Coordinates: 36°55′N 30°41′E
- Country: Turkey
- Province: Antalya

Government
  - Mayor: Mesut Kocagöz (CHP)
- Area: 292 km^{2} (113 sq mi)
- Elevation: 289 m (948 ft)
- Population (2025): 649,102
  - Density: 2,220/km^{2} (5,760/sq mi)
- Time zone: UTC+3 (TRT)
- Postal code: 07090
- Area code: 0242
- Website: www.kepez-bld.gov.tr

Kepez is a municipality and district of Antalya Province, Turkey. Its area is 292 km^{2}, and its population is 649,102 (2025).

== Geography ==
Kepez is a part of Greater Antalya proper. The name Kepez means rocky area, referring to the local landscape prior to urbanisation, which consisted of a rocky plateau.

=== Composition ===
There are 68 neighbourhoods in Kepez District:

- Ahatlı
- Aktoprak
- Altıayak
- Altınova Düden
- Altınova Orta
- Altınova Sinan
- Atatürk
- Avni Tolunay
- Ayanoğlu
- Aydoğmuş
- Baraj
- Barış
- Başköy
- Beşkonaklılar
- Çamlıbel
- Çamlıca
- Çankaya
- Demirel
- Duacı
- Düdenbaşı
- Duraliler
- Emek
- Erenköy
- Esentepe
- Fabrikalar
- Fatih
- Fevzi Çakmak
- Gazi
- Gaziler
- Göçerler
- Göksu
- Gülveren
- Gündoğdu
- Güneş
- Habibler
- Hüsnükarakaş
- Kanal
- Karşıyaka
- Kazımkarabekir
- Kepez
- Kirişçiler
- Kızıllı
- Kültür
- Kütükçü
- Kuzeyyaka
- Mehmet Akif Ersoy
- Menderes
- Odabaşı
- Özgürlük
- Şafak
- Santral
- Şelale
- Sütçüler
- Teomanpaşa
- Ulus
- Ünsal
- Varsak Esentepe
- Varsak Karşıyaka
- Varsak Menderes
- Yavuz Selim
- Yenidoğan
- Yeniemek
- Yenimahalle
- Yeşiltepe
- Yeşilyurt
- Yükseliş
- Zafer
- Zeytinlik

== History ==
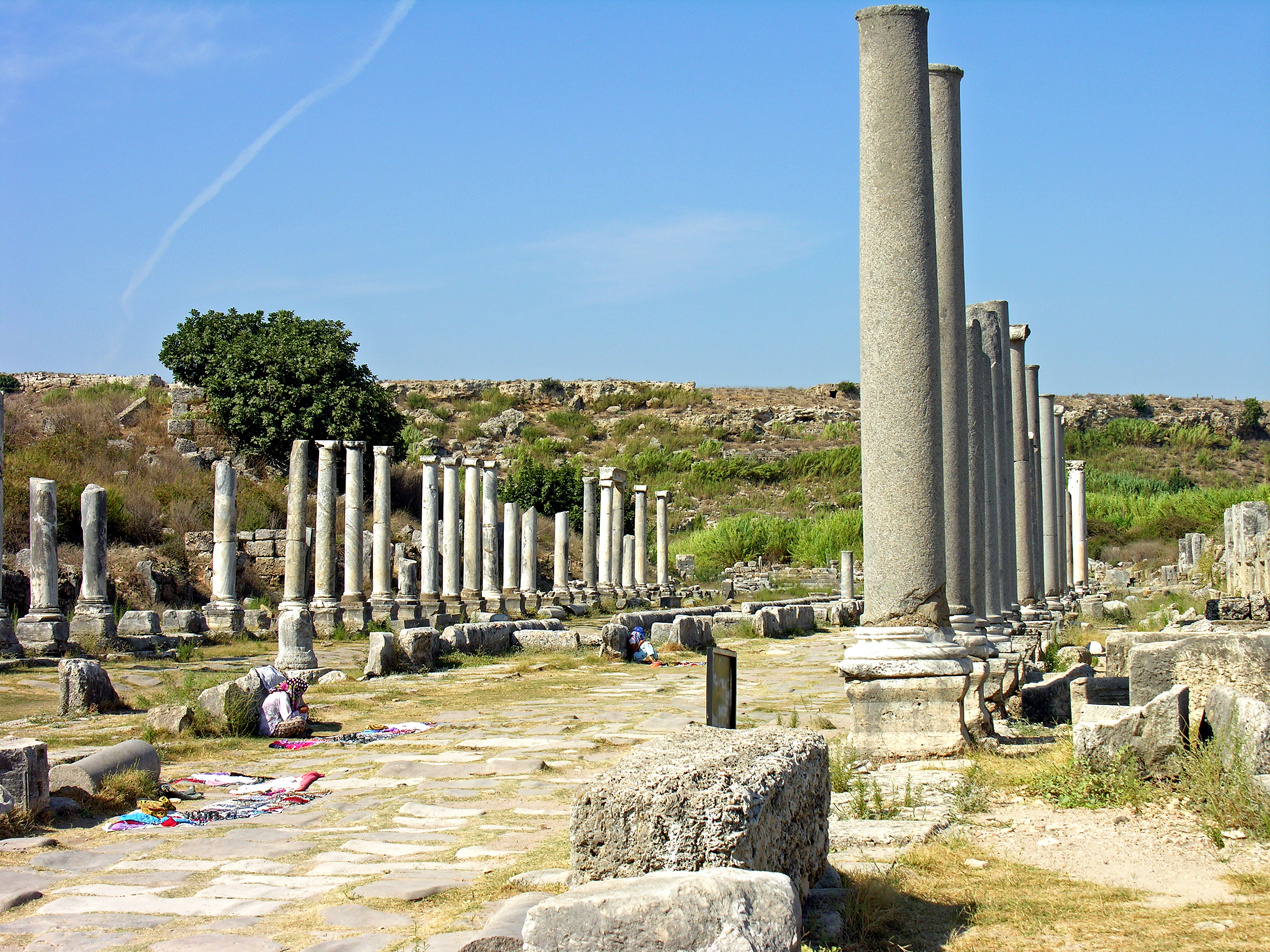
Ancient Greek and Roman ruins in Kepez

Kepez, like the rest of Greater Antalya, was wrested between the Seljuk Turks and the Byzantines during the 11th and 12th centuries. After 1216, Kepez was incorporated into the Seljuk realm. After the disintegration of the Seljuks, the area fell under the control of the Turkmen Beylik of Teke. In 1389, the city was captured by the Ottoman Empire. After the defeat of the Ottomans in the Battle of Ankara in 1402, Kepez was annexed by the Karamanids, another Turkmen principality, and stayed within their control until 1415. During this brief period a Turkmen tribe named Varsak was settled around Kepez. After 1415 Antalya became an Ottoman territory. During the Republican era the scattered population around Kepez increased. After Antalya was declared as the metropolitan center, the Kepez municipality was incorporated into Greater Antalya in 1993 and the corresponding district governorate was established in 2008.

== Population ==
Historical population
Year	Pop.	±% p.a.
2008	387,904	—
2009	394,672	+1.74%
2010	406,819	+3.08%
2011	419,997	+3.24%
2012	433,961	+3.32%
2013	450,734	+3.87%
2014	470,759	+4.44%
2015	497,242	+5.63%
2016	508,123	+2.19%
2017	519,966	+2.33%
2018	531,619	+2.24%
2019	556,033	+4.59%
2020	574,183	+3.26%
2021	591,895	+3.08%
2022	608,675	+2.83%
2023	614,135	+0.90%
2024	629,479	+2.50%
2025	649,102	+3.12%
Source: TÜİK

== Archaeology ==
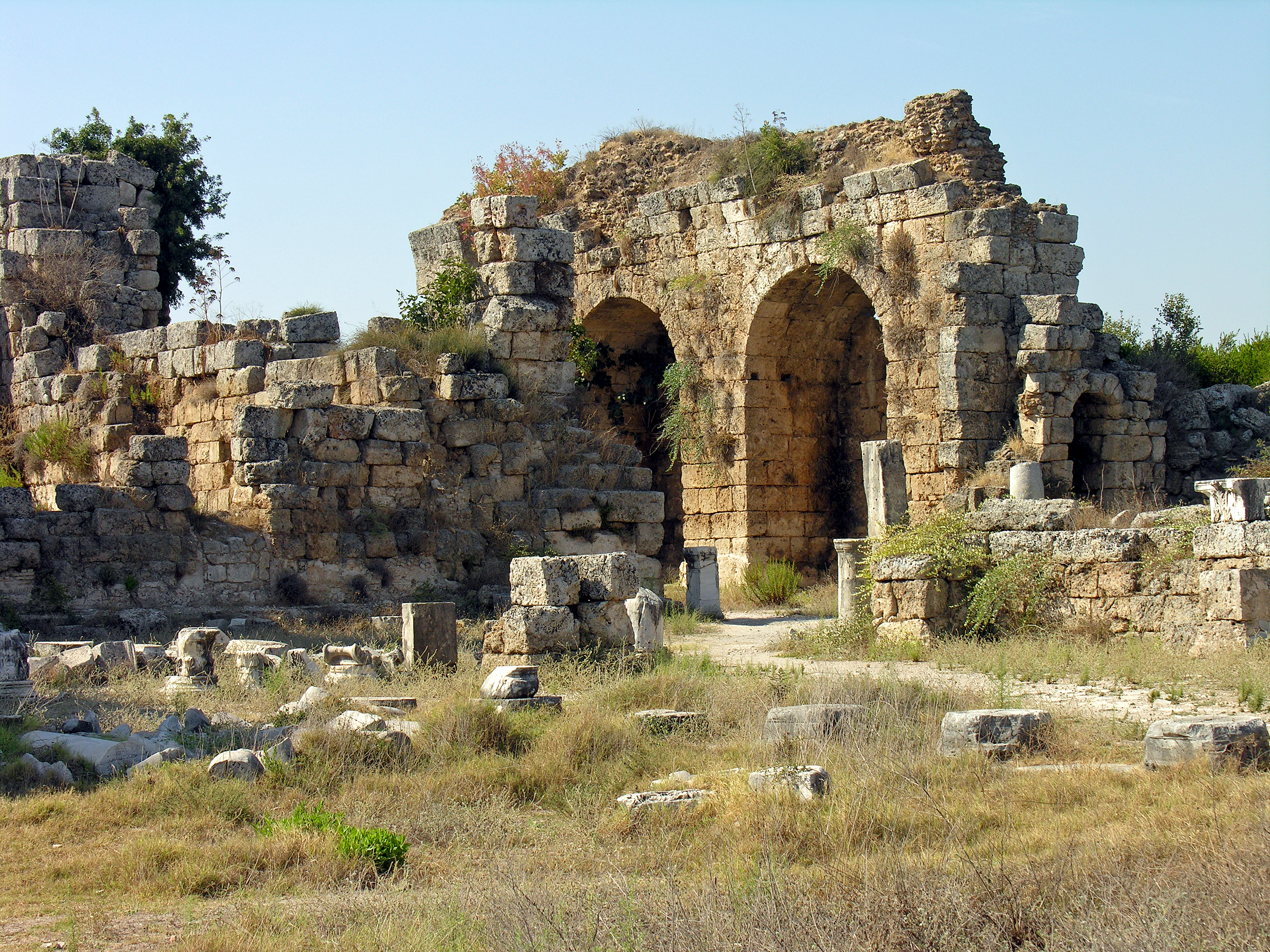
Ruins of an ancient city in Kepez

The ancient city of Lyrboton Kome (Ancient Greek: Λυρβωτῶν κώμη), located in the Kepez district on a hill in Varsak, was discovered in 1910 by European archaeologists. The city was an important olive oil production center in the region and had close ties to Perge. The ancient city became a settlement during the Hellenistic era but the area grew during the era of Roman Emperor Domitian in the first century.

== Kepez today ==
Antalya bus terminal and a cement factory as well as a hydroelectric plant are in Kepez. Although not a seaside district, Kepez maintains a number of tourist attractions like Düden Waterfalls and the zoo of Antalya. Scenic areas, such as Kepezüstü, are also visited.
