= Akçamezra, Oğuzeli =

Village in Gaziantep Province, Turkey

Akçamezra
- Neighbourhood
- Location within Turkey
- Coordinates: 36°48′20″N 37°34′27″E
- Country: Turkey
- Province: Gaziantep
- District: Oğuzeli
- Population (2022): 171
- Time zone: UTC+3 (TRT)

Akçamezra is a neighbourhood in the municipality and district of Oğuzeli, Gaziantep Province, Turkey. Its population is 171 (2022).

== 2026 tornado ==
On May 3, 2026, a violent IF4 tornado struck Oğuzeli (city) and Akçamezra, destroying multiple houses, pistachio trees, along with other things. This is the strongest tornado both in Syria and Turkey.
