= Üçdamlar, Oğuzeli =

Village in Gaziantep Province, Turkey

Üçdamlar
- Neighbourhood
- Location in Turkey
- Coordinates: 36°45′32″N 37°34′39″E
- Country: Turkey
- Province: Gaziantep
- District: Oğuzeli
- Population (2022): 82
- Time zone: UTC+3 (TRT)

Üçdamlar, formerly and still informally called Kandevir, is a neighbourhood in the municipality and district of Oğuzeli, Gaziantep Province, Turkey. Its population is 82 (2022). The village is inhabited by Turkmens from various tribes, including Elbegli and Barak, as well as Abdals of the Kurular tribe.
