= Subaşı, Derik =

Village in Mardin Province, Turkey

Subaşı
- Neighbourhood
- Location in Turkey
- Coordinates: 37.430°N 39.953°E
- Country: Turkey
- Province: Mardin
- District: Derik
- Population (2021): 581
- Time zone: UTC+3 (TRT)

Subaşı (Kurdish: Zok) is a neighbourhood in the municipality and district of Derik, Mardin Province in Turkey. The village is populated by Kurds of the Sefan tribe and had a population of 581 in 2021.
