= Gümüştaş, Çınar =

Village in Turkey

Gümüştaş
- Neighbourhood
- Location in Turkey
- Coordinates: 37°32′06″N 39°58′34″E
- Country: Turkey
- Province: Diyarbakır
- District: Çınar
- Population (2022): 1,103
- Time zone: UTC+3 (TRT)

Gümüştaş is a neighbourhood in the municipality and district of Çınar, Diyarbakır Province in Turkey. Its population is 1,103 (2022).
