= İnkılap, Oğuzeli =

Village in Gaziantep Province, Turkey

İnkılap
- Neighbourhood
- Location in Turkey
- Coordinates: 36°44′8″N 37°33′41″E
- Country: Turkey
- Province: Gaziantep
- District: Oğuzeli
- Population (2022): 70
- Time zone: UTC+3 (TRT)

İnkılap is a neighbourhood in the municipality and district of Oğuzeli, Gaziantep Province, Turkey. Its population is 70 (2022). The village is inhabited by various tribes of Turkmens.
