= Çaybeyi, Oğuzeli =

Village in Gaziantep Province, Turkey

Çaybeyi
- Neighbourhood
- Location in Turkey
- Coordinates: 36°47′27″N 37°34′58″E
- Country: Turkey
- Province: Gaziantep
- District: Oğuzeli
- Population (2022): 248
- Time zone: UTC+3 (TRT)

Çaybeyi, historically Yona, is a neighbourhood in the municipality and district of Oğuzeli, Gaziantep Province, Turkey. Its population is 248 (2022).
