= Çangallı, Elbeyli =

Village in Kilis Province, Turkey

Çangallı
- Village
- Location within Turkey
- Coordinates: 36°42′44″N 37°33′16″E
- Country: Turkey
- Province: Kilis
- District: Elbeyli
- Population (2022): 88
- Time zone: UTC+3 (TRT)

Çangallı is a village in the Elbeyli District, Kilis Province, Turkey. The village is inhabited by Turkmens of the Elbegli tribe and Abdals of the Kurular tribe and had a population of 88 in 2022.
