= Turkish Statistical Institute =

Turkish government agency

- Türkiye İstatistik Kurumu

Agency overview
- Formed: 25 April 1926 (100 years ago)
- Jurisdiction: Turkey
- Headquarters: Ankara, Turkey
- Agency executive: Erhan Çetinkaya, President
- Website: tuik.gov.tr

The Turkish Statistical Institute (commonly known as TurkStat; Turkish: Türkiye İstatistik Kurumu, abbreviated TÜİK) is a Turkish government agency responsible for producing official statistics on Turkey's population, resources, economy, society, and culture. Founded on 25 April 1926 and headquartered in Ankara, the institute operates through 26 regional directorates across the country. Formerly known as the State Institute of Statistics (Turkish: Devlet İstatistik Enstitüsü, DİE), the institute was reorganized and renamed under Law No. 5429 on 18 November 2005.

== History ==
The institute was established on 25 April 1926 as the Central Statistical Department (Turkish: Merkezi İstatistik Dairesi), shortly after the founding of the Republic of Turkey. Over the following decades, the organization underwent several name changes: it became the General Directorate of Statistics (Turkish: İstatistik Umum Müdürlüğü) in 1930, then İstatistik Genel Müdürlüğü in 1945, and was reorganized as the State Institute of Statistics (Turkish: Devlet İstatistik Enstitüsü) in 1962.

In 2005, the Turkish government enacted Law No. 5429, which modernized the institute's organizational structure and aligned its practices with international standards. The legislation established principles for official statistics, created a multi-annual statistical programme, and reorganized the Statistical Council as part of the institute's structure. The institute was renamed the Turkish Statistical Institute (TÜİK) on 18 November 2005.

== Functions ==
TurkStat serves as Turkey's primary producer of official statistics and the coordination authority for the Turkish Statistical System. Its core responsibilities include conducting nationwide censuses, producing economic indicators such as GDP, inflation, and trade statistics, and monitoring social indicators related to education, health, employment, and quality of life. The institute also collects data on agricultural production, land use, and environmental sustainability.

In 2007, TurkStat implemented an address-based population registration system to improve demographic data collection. The institute publishes the Consumer Price Index (CPI) and Producer Price Index (PPI) monthly, calculated using a basket of goods and services weighted by household expenditure surveys.

== International cooperation ==
TurkStat operates in compliance with global statistical standards set by the United Nations and the European Union. As part of Turkey's EU harmonization efforts, the institute has adopted the European Statistical System (ESS) framework to ensure data comparability and quality. TurkStat collaborates with international organizations including the World Bank, OECD, and IMF.

== Controversies ==
TurkStat has faced criticism regarding the reliability of its statistics, particularly concerning inflation and unemployment data. Since April 2019, the head of TurkStat has been replaced multiple times by President Recep Tayyip Erdoğan, leading to allegations that leadership changes occurred when reported figures exceeded government expectations. In January 2022, President Erdoğan dismissed Professor Erdal Dinçer from the helm of TurkStat after the institute released data showing annual inflation had reached a 19-year high of 36.1 percent.

In response to concerns about official statistics, the Inflation Research Group (ENAG), an independent team of economists and academics based in Istanbul, was established in 2020 to publish alternative inflation calculations. ENAG's figures have frequently exceeded TurkStat's official rates, sometimes by more than double. TurkStat filed criminal complaints against ENAG in 2021, accusing the group of misleading the public, though courts dismissed the cases.

The International Statistical Institute, the International Association for Official Statistics, and the ISI Advisory Board on Ethics issued a joint statement in 2022 expressing concern about the dismissal of TurkStat's president and the transparency of appointment procedures, stating that such actions significantly undermined the institution's credibility. A 2022 MetroPoll survey found that 69 percent of Turkish respondents believed ENAG's inflation figures were more accurate than TurkStat's official data.

== See also ==
- List of Turkish provinces by life expectancy
- Economy of Turkey
- Demographics of Turkey
