= List of tornadoes rated on the 2018 International Fujita scale =

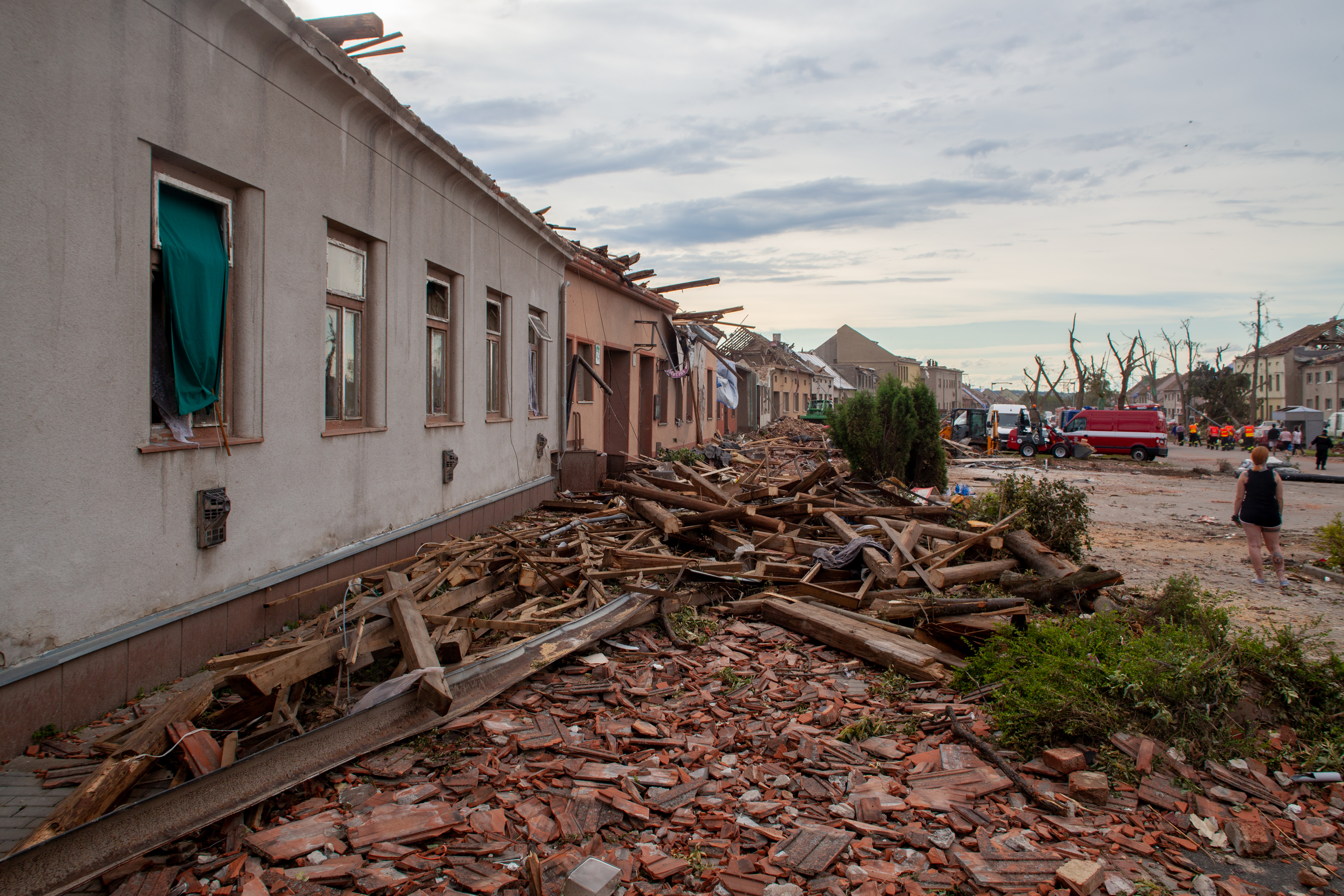
Damaged houses from the 2021 South Moravia tornado, which is currently tied as the strongest tornado ever rated on the International Fujita scale

This is a list of tornadoes that have been rated officially or unofficially on the International Fujita scale (IF-scale). The International Fujita scale was drafted in 2018 by the European Severe Storms Laboratory (ESSL) along with multiple European meteorological agencies. As of 2026, the scale is used all over Europe, however, various tornadoes have received official/unofficial ratings under the scale. Since the scale is not officially in use, official ratings can only come from published academic papers or analyses from a government meteorological agency or from the European Severe Storms Laboratory and their partners. On May 6th, 2023, version 0.99.9d was published, which changed it to a 9-step rating scale. This replaced the 12-step scale used to rate tornadoes on this list.

== List ==
At least 40 tornadoes received an official or unofficial rating on the 2018 draft version of the International Fujita scale, with official ones in the Czech Republic, Denmark, Italy, Russia, Greece, Germany, Turkey, Poland, Norway, Sweden, Netherlands, Cyprus, Spain, Slovak Republic, and in France, and two unofficial ones in the United States.

Tornadoes officially or unofficially rated on the International Fujita scale
IF-scale rating	Day	Year	Country	Subdivision	Location	Notes	Rated by
IF0+	October 16	1942	Denmark	Kalundborg Kommune	Føllenslev	A tornado destroyed the roof of a hay barrack. The tornado was given an F0 rating on the F scale, T1 on the torro scale, and an IF0+ rating on the IF scale due to the roof damage	ESSL
IF2	May 16	1953	Denmark	Kolding Municipality	Hejls	A strong tornado deroofed several homes, damaged a forest & tossed a chicken barn up to 3 kilometers. The tornado was given an F2 rating on the F scale, and an IF2 rating on the IF scale due to the roof damage	ESSL
IF2−	September 6	1954	Denmark	Fredericia Municipality	Nørremark	This strong tornado earned an F2/T4 rating, and an IF2− rating on the IF scale when it overturned a car	ESSL
IF2+	September 9	1955	Denmark	Kolding Municipality	Kolding	An intense tornado displaced a car 20 meters into a yard, earning an F2/T5 rating, and an IF2+ rating on the IF scale	ESSL
≥IF2+	May 10	2015	Germany	Bavaria	Affing	An intense tornado that destroyed trees and badly damaged or destroyed numerous structures. This tornado was rated F3 on the Fujita scale and T6 on the TORRO scale. In the initial publication of the draft version of the IF scale, damage to a sturdy house from this tornado was rated ≥IF2+.	ESSL
IF4	July 8	2015	Italy	Riviera del Brenta	Dolo, Mira, Veneto	A violent tornado that damaged or destroyed numerous structures, with a few pockets of damage being rated F4 on the Fujita scale. In the initial publication of the draft version of the IF scale, two locations from this tornado that were rated F4 were identified and rated as IF4.	ESSL
IF1+	November 10	2017	Germany	Brandenburg	Barenthin	A short-lived tornado that caused the destruction and collapse of an old house, damage to multiple other structures, and multiple trees were snapped. This tornado is rated F1 on the Fujita scale and T3 on the TORRO scale. In the initial publication of the draft version of the IF scale, damage to a shed from this tornado was rated IF1+.	ESSL
IF1	April 27	2018	Sweden	Jönköping County	Värnamo	A tornado struck the Industrial district of Värnamo. Several roofs were damaged, windows were destroyed & objects were thrown. The tornado received an F1 rating on the Fujita scale, but was rated IF1 on the IF scale. It was noted that it may have reached IF1+ or IF2− intensity.	ESSL
IF2	May 11	2018	Sweden	Östergötland County	Vårdsberg	A strong tornado snapped & uprooted several spruce trees at a forest edge. This tornado received a rating of F2 on the Fujita scale & was given a rating of IF2 on the IF scale.	ESSL
IF1+	June 14	2019	Denmark	Aabenraa Municipality	Kruså	Several trees were downed & a garage were destroyed by this tornado. This tornado is rated F1 on the Fujita scale and T3 on the TORRO scale. The tornado received an IF1+ rating on the IF scale because of the collapsed garage.	ESSL
IF2−	June 14	2019	Denmark	Region of Southern Denmark	Åbenrå	This strong tornado overturned cars in a hospital parking lot. The main rating of this tornado was F2 on the Fujita scale and T4 on the TORRO scale. At an ESSL tornado-workshop on the IF-scale, this tornado was rated IF2− based on overturned cars.	ESSL
IF1	August 10	2019	Denmark	Helsingør Municipality	Ålsgårde	A tornado that broke branches off oak trees that had a diameter up to 20 centimetres (7.9 in). The main rating of this tornado is F1 on the Fujita scale, however, the tree damage received an intensity rating of IF1.	ESSL
IF2	May 29	2020	Russia	Oryol Oblast	Verkhov'ye	A strong tornado occurred in a forest, causing significant forestry damage. This tornado received a rating of F2 on the Fujita scale, however, it was noted that the extensive debarking, trunks being snapped, and additional debarking that was caused by "snapping impacts" were the reasons this tornado was given a rating of IF2.	ESSL
IF2−	September 25	2020	Denmark	Albertslund Kommune	Albertslund	This strong tornado damaged many homes and trees within a 4.4-kilometer (2.7 mi) long & 220-meter (720 ft) wide path. Roof tiles were stripped off homes, large trees were uprooted or snapped &Trampolines were thrown long distances. A tree was uprooted and then dragged up to 2 meters across the ground. The main rating of this tornado was F2 on the Fujita scale and T4 on the TORRO scale. The Tornado received an IF2− rating because it snapped several healthy trees. .	ESSL
IF1	November 26	2020	Spain	Andalucía	Encinarejo de Córdoba	A tornado damaged some roofs & damaged windshields on a car. The main rating of this tornado is F1 on the Fujita scale, however, the roof damage received an intensity rating of IF1.	ESSL
IF1	December 9	2020	Greece	Aitolía kai Akarnanía	Astakós	A tornado damaged some roofs. The main rating of this tornado is F1 on the Fujita scale, however, the roof damage received an intensity rating of IF1.	ESSL
IF1+	December 14	2020	Cyprus	Nicosia	Astromeritis	A tornado associated with a squall line caused roof damage, downed signs & downed trees. tornado was rated F1 on the F scale, and an IF1+. on the IF scale	ESSL
IF0+	January 30	2021	Turkey	Hatay Province	Tekebaşı	A Tornado damaged greenhouses & crops. The tornado earned an F0 on the fujita, T1 on the torro scale, and IF0+ on the IF scale	
IF1	January 30	2021	Turkey	Hatay Province	Vakıflı	A Restaurant area sustained moderate damage. Garage roof torn off, roofs damaged & a pine tree were snapped. The tornado earned an F1 rating on the fujita scale, and an IF1 rating on the IF scale.	ESSL
IF1	February 11	2021	Turkey	Balıkesir Province	Paşalimanı	A tornado overturned or threw 15 small boats into the sea & damaged roofs. A forest was also damaged. It earned an F1 rating on the fujita scale, and an IF1 rating on the IF scale.	ESSL
IF2	February 11	2021	Turkey	İzmir Province	Alaçatı	A strong tornado damaged or destroyed several buildings, damaged or tossed boats & flipped vehicles, one of which landed behind some walls. Trees were snapped or uprooted. The tornado was given an F2 rating on the F scale, and an IF2 rating on the IF scale. 16 people were injured	ESSL
IF1+	March 22	2021	Turkey	Yozgat Province	Külhüyük	A tornado snapped power poles, resulting in power outages & snapped trees. Some roofs sustained damage & a weak outbuilding was blown down. The tornado received a rating of IF1+, but it was noted that IF2− was possible as well.	ESSL
IF1	April 22	2021	Slovak Republic	Košický kraj	Ortáše	A tornado caused moderate damage to buildings and trees. The tornado was given an F1 rating on the fujita scale, and an IF1 rating on the IF scale	ESSL
IF4	June 24	2021	Czech Republic	South Moravian Region	Hrušky, Moravská Nová Ves, Mikulčice, Lužice	2021 South Moravia tornado – A violent and deadly tornado that damaged or destroyed 1,200 structures through multiple towns. In 2021, the Czech Hydrometeorological Institute (CHMI) published a survey and analysis report of the tornado, rating it F4 on the Fujita scale. In 2022, a joint report with the European Severe Storms Laboratory and other European meteorological agencies officially rated this tornado an IF4, with at least 14 different locations of IF4 damage occurring. In Mikulčice, a well-built brick structure was completely destroyed, which would warrant an IF5 rating. However, a rather weak connection between the roof and the walls was found, which prevented the damage to be assigned an IF5 rating. This location was assigned peak windspeed estimated at 380 km/h (236.1 mph).	ESSL, CHMI, SHMÚ, Charles University, Tomáš Prouza
IF1	October 12	2021	Turkey	Muğla Province	Selimiye	A tornado caused moderate damage to buildings and trees. The tornado was given an F1 rating on the fujita scale, and an IF1 rating on the IF scale	ESSL
IF1+	October 21	2021	Netherlands	Zuid-Holland	Barendrecht	A tornado associated with Storm Aurore hit Barendrecht. Roof tiles were stripped off homes, trees were uprooted & cars were moved. The main rating of this tornado is F1 on the Fujita scale, however, the car sliding received a rating of IF1+. 4 people were injured.	ESSL
IF0+	November 2	2021	Turkey	Mersin Province	Tisan	A Tornado damaged roofs, downed trees, small fisher boats lifted or overthrown. A single small boat was thrown onto a tree. The tornado earned an F0 on the fujita, T1 on the torro scale, and IF0+ on the IF scale	ESSL
IF1	November 27	2021	Greece	Elis Province	Palaiochori	A tornado (or tornado family) that caused damage to multiple trees, overturned cars, and caused telecommunication infrastructure damage. This tornado was rated F1 on the Fujita scale . However, Wooden power poles that were snapped by the tornado were given a rating of IF1 and damage to some roofs was given a rating of IF1−.	ESSL
IF2−	November 29	2021	Greece	Preveza	Kanali	A strong waterspout came ashore and caused significant infrastructure damage. This tornado was rated a low-end F2 on the Fujita scale; however, an IF2− rating was assigned to at least one roof that was destroyed on a "likely weak frame" house.	ESSL
IF4 (Unofficial)	December 10	2021	United States	Tennessee, Kentucky	Woodland Mills (Tennessee), Cayce (Kentucky), Mayfield, Benton, Princeton, Dawson Springs, Bremen	2021 Western Kentucky tornado — A long-tracked wedge and ninth tornado spawned by the Quad-State supercell, that damaged, destroyed, or obliterated numerous structures along a path of 165.6 miles (266.5 km). This tornado was officially rated an EF4 on the Enhanced Fujita scale. During a thread on Twitter, Pieter Groenemeijer, the director of the European Severe Storms Laboratory, discussed the differences between the 2021 Western Kentucky tornado and the 2021 South Moravia tornado. In the thread, it was noted that one of the EF4 damage indicators would "probably be a D-class structure in the IF rating system, which gives a rating of IF4 when (almost) completely destroyed as seems to be the case here", meaning the 2021 Western Kentucky tornado would have probably been equivalent to at least an IF4 on the International Fujita scale.	Pieter Groenemeijer (Director of ESSL)
IF1+	December 19	2021	Turkey	Antalya Province	Avsallar	A waterspout that came ashore, becoming a tornado that overturned a truck passing on a road along the shore. The main rating of this tornado is F1 on the Fujita scale, however, the overturned truck received a rating of IF1+.	ESSL
IF1−	February 22	2022	Turkey	Muğla Province	Yalı	A waterspout came ashore, becoming a tornado that caused damage to roofs and power lines. The main rating of this tornado is F1 on the Fujita scale, however, it is noted that a container near a local hotel was "overthrown", which received a rating of IF1−.	ESSL
IF1	April 7	2022	Poland	Greater Poland Voivodeship	Ostrów Wielkopolski	An extremely brief tornado occurred in Poland which caused damage to structures and damaged or uprooted multiple trees along a path of 0.31 kilometres (0.19 mi). Based on damage to trees, it is believed this tornado could have been an anticyclonic tornado. This tornado received a rating of F1 on the Fujita scale, however, it was also noted that "IF1 category of damage was assigned (upper T2 / lower T3)" for certain portions of the tornadoes damage.	ESSL
IF4/IF5 (Unofficial)	April 29	2022	United States	Kansas	Andover	2022 Andover tornado — An intense tornado that damaged or destroyed numerous structures, including obliterating multiple poorly anchored structures. This tornado was rated EF3 on the Enhanced Fujita scale by the National Weather Service. On October 26, 2022, at the AMS 30th Conference on Severe Local Storms, the European Severe Storms Laboratory presented evidence through photogrammetry that the tornado had winds of at least 118.0 metres per second (264 mph), with a graphic showing IF4 and IF5 intensity.	ESSL
IF1	June 27	2022	Netherlands	Zeeland	Zierikzee	A brief, but deadly waterspout that came ashore. The main rating of this tornado was F1 on the Fujita scale. However, it was noted that rooftiles being blown off from structures by the tornado was rated IF1− and an overturned trailer was rated IF1.	ESSL
IF1	June 29	2022	Czech Republic	South Bohemian Region	Sviny	A brief tornado that caused IF1 damage at three locations along a path of 2.3 kilometres (1.4 mi). Near the beginning of the path, two mature poplar trees were damaged, with one being uprooted and the other having significantly broken branches from the crown of the tree. Both of these trees received IF1 ratings. The tornado then entered a grove of trees, causing minor damage, except branches were broken near the upper portions of the trees, indicating IF1 damage. This tornado received a rating of F1 on the Fujita scale from the European Severe Storms Laboratory, but the Czech Hydrometeorological Institute, the Czech Republic's government meteorological agency, officially rated this tornado IF1.	CHMI
IF1	August 6	2022	Sweden	Dalarnas län	Kallholen	A tornado that uprooted a few pine trees and received a rating of F1 on the Fujita scale and T3 on the TORRO scale. However, it was noted that the uprooted trees were rated IF1.	ESSL
IF1	October 16	2022	Norway	Rogaland	Sandve	The first of tornadoes in Norway that day. The main rating of this tornado was F1 on the Fujita scale, however, the European Severe Storms Laboratory gave it a "maximum intensity" rating of IF1.	ESSL
IF1	October 16	2022	Norway	Telemark	Brevikstranda	The second of two tornadoes in Norway that day. The main rating of this tornado was F1 on the Fujita scale, however, it was noted that tree damage was up to IF1.	ESSL
IF3	October 23	2022	France	Hauts-de-France	Bihucourt	2022 Belleuse-Bihucourt, France/Leuze-en-Hainaut, Belgium tornado – A long track tornado tracked 206 kilometres (128 mi) through France & Belgium, damaging or destroying many homes. The tornado was rated F3 on the Fujita scale & IF3 on the IF scale. 1 person was injured	ESSL

== See also ==
- Tornado
  - Tornadoes by year
  - Tornado records
  - Tornado climatology
  - Tornado myths
- Tornado intensity
  - Fujita scale
  - Enhanced Fujita scale
  - International Fujita scale
  - TORRO scale
