= Meteorology in the 21st century =

This is a timeline of scientific and technological advancements as well as notable academic or government publications in the area of atmospheric sciences and meteorology during the 21st century. Some historical weather events are included that mark time periods where advancements were made, or even that sparked policy change.

== 2000s ==
=== 2001 ===
- January – Researchers from the University of Maryland, College Park and McGill University published a numerical case study, funded by the National Science Foundation, on Hurricane Andrew in 1992.

=== 2002 ===
- April–September – A Service Assessment Team was formed by the United States government to assess the quality of forecasts and post-tornado assessments conducted by the National Weather Service (NWS) office in Baltimore/Washington for the 2002 La Plata tornado. Their assessment and findings, released in September 2002, found:
  - That the local NWS office failed to indicate the initial findings of F5 damage on the Fujita scale was "preliminary" to the media and public.
  - The Service Assessment Team also recommended the National Oceanic and Atmospheric Administration require local National Weather Service offices to only release "potentially greater than F3" if F4 or F5 damage was suspected and to only release information regarding F4 or F5 damage after Quick Response Team (QRT) had assessed the damage.
- September – The National Weather Service creates a national Quick Response Team (QRT), whose job is to assess and analyze locations believed to have sustained F4 or F5 damage on the Fujita scale.

=== 2003 ===
- August – Researchers at McGill University's Department of Atmospheric and Oceanic Sciences published case study to the American Meteorological Society on Hurricane Earl in 1998.

=== 2004 ===
- February – Researchers at the Cooperative Institute for Meteorological Satellite Studies (CIMSS) published a case study to the American Meteorological Society on category 5 Hurricane Isabel in 2003.

=== 2005 ===
- June 2005 – January 2006 – A record 27 named storms occurred during the Atlantic hurricane season. The National Hurricane Center runs out of names from its standard list and uses Greek alphabet for the first time.

=== 2006 ===
- November – Timothy P. Marshall and Stuart Robinson published a case study to the American Meteorological Society about the 2005 Birmingham tornado.

=== 2007 ===
- February – The Enhanced Fujita scale is formally released and put into use across the United States, replacing the Fujita scale.
- May – The 2007 Greensburg tornado family occurred, producing a tornado family of 22 tornadoes, including the first tornado to receive the rating of EF5 on the Enhanced Fujita scale; the 2007 Greensburg tornado.

=== 2008 ===
- August – Timothy P. Marshall, a meteorologist and structural and forensic engineer with Haag Engineering, Karl A. Jungbluth with the National Weather Service, and Abigail Baca with RMS Consulting Group, published a detailed damage survey and analysis for the 2008 Parkersburg–New Hartford tornado.
- October
  - Leslie R. Lemon with the University of Oklahoma and Mike Umscheid with the National Weather Service published a detailed case study on The Greensburg tornado family.
  - Matthew R. Clark with the United Kingdom's Met Office published a case study on a tornadic storm in southern England on December 30, 2006.

=== 2009 ===
- February – Researchers with the University of Mississippi, University at Buffalo, and University of California Riverside published a case study on the relief efforts conducted in response to Hurricane Katrina in 2005.

== 2010s ==
=== 2010 ===
- June – Richard M. Zoraster, with the Los Angeles County Emergency Medical Services Agency, publishes a case study, through the University of Cambridge, on the population vulnerably during Hurricane Katrina in 2005.

=== 2011 ===
- April – The 2011 Super Outbreak occurs across the United States.
- May – A violent EF5 tornado strikes Joplin, Missouri, killing 158 people, becoming the deadliest modern-day tornado in the United States.
- October – The Hong Kong Observatory and the U.S. Center for Severe Weather Research publish a joint paper analyzing a rare tornado in Hong Kong on May 20, 2002.

=== 2012 ===
- February – Researchers at North Carolina State University's Department of Marine, Earth, and Atmospheric Science published a case study to the American Meteorological Society on category 5 Hurricane Felix in 2007.

=== 2013 ===
- April – Environment Canada (EC) adopts a variation of the Enhanced Fujita scale (CEF-scale), replacing the Fujita scale across Canada.
- May
  - A violent EF5 tornado impacts Moore, Oklahoma, which would be the last tornado to receive the rating of EF5 on the Enhanced Fujita scale until 2025.
  - A violent tornado impacts areas around El Reno, Oklahoma. The University of Oklahoma's RaXPol mobile Doppler weather radar, positioned at a nearby overpass, measured winds preliminarily analyzed as in excess of 296 mph (476 km/h). These winds are considered the second-highest ever measured worldwide, just shy of the 302 ± 22 mph (486 ± 35 km/h) recorded during the 1999 Bridge Creek–Moore tornado.
- August – The International Federation of Red Cross and Red Crescent Societies publish a report on Tropical Storm Washi in 2011, challenging the official death toll, saying it was 2,546, rather than the 1,292 deaths reported by the World Meteorological Organization.

=== 2014 ===
- August – Meteorologist, structural and forensic engineer Timothy P. Marshall, along with the National Weather Service and Texas Tech University's National Wind Institute, published a detailed damage survey and analysis of the 2014 Mayflower–Vilonia, Arkansas EF4 tornado.
- October
  - Researchers with the Cooperative Institute for Severe and High-Impact Weather Research and Operations (CIWRO), National Weather Service (NWS), National Severe Storms Laboratory (NSSL), and Timothy P. Marshall with Haag Engineering, published a detailed damage survey and analysis on the 2013 Moore, Oklahoma EF5 tornado.
  - Researchers at Lyndon State College and the University of Colorado Boulder published a damage and radar analysis of the 2013 Moore tornado.

=== 2015 ===
- September – The European Severe Storms Laboratory along with the Max Planck Institute for Nuclear Physics publish a detailed assessment of the 1764 Woldegk tornado, in which it was assigned a rating of F5 on the Fujita scale, marking the oldest official F5 tornado.

=== 2016 ===
- August – The National Oceanic and Atmospheric Administration publishes that a Doppler on Wheels measured 40 to 90 metres per second (89 to 201 mph; 0.040 to 0.090 km/s) for 21 seconds during the 2016 Dodge City EF2 tornado.

=== 2017 ===
- March – Researchers at Florida State University, the University of Colorado Denver, the University of Texas at Austin, and the University of Notre Dame, published a case study to the American Meteorological Society on the effects that category 4 Hurricane Gustav in 2008 had on the Bay of St. Louis.

=== 2018 ===
- August – Researchers with the University of Oklahoma's School of Meteorology (OU SoM), National Weather Service (NWS), National Severe Storms Laboratory (NSSL), and Ohio University, published a detailed analysis of the multiple-vortex nature of the 2013 El Reno, Oklahoma tornado.

=== 2019 ===
- 2019–2023 – The Targeted Observation by Radars and UAS of Supercells (TORUS) project, led by the University of Nebraska–Lincoln, along with the NOAA National Severe Storms Laboratory (NSSL), NOAA Office of Marine and Aviation Operations (OMAO), Cooperative Institute for Severe and High-Impact Weather Research and Operations (CIWRO), and Texas Tech University, and the University of Colorado Boulder, occurs.

== 2020s ==
=== 2020 ===
- March – The European Centre for Medium-Range Weather Forecasts (ECMWF) announced that a worldwide reduction in aircraft flights due to the COVID-19 pandemic could impact the accuracy of weather forecasts, citing commercial airlines' use of Aircraft Meteorological Data Relay (AMDAR) as an integral contribution to weather forecast accuracy. The ECMWF predicted that AMDAR coverage would decrease by 65% or more due to the drop in commercial flights.
- May – Researchers at Howard University, the Cooperative Science Center for Atmospheric Sciences and Meteorology, and the National Center for Atmospheric Research (NCAR), published a detailed damage survey and analysis on the 2011 Tuscaloosa–Birmingham EF4 tornado.
- June – The World Meteorological Organization announces new records for the longest lightning bolt (700 km) and the "megaflash" with the longest duration (16.73 s).

=== 2021 ===
- April – Typhoon Surigae Forms and strengthens from category two-equivalent to a category five within a single day (April 17). Two days later, while Typhoon Surigae was still a category 4-equivalent, Matthew Cappucci, a meteorologist with The Washington Post, published an analysis linking the rapid-strengthening of Typhoon Surigae to climate change saying it was "bearing the fingerprint of climate change".

=== 2022 ===
- March – The National Weather Service publishes a new damage survey and analysis for the 2012 Henryville EF4 tornado, where a "possible EF5 damage" location is identified and discussed.
- June – A review elucidates the current state of climate change extreme event attribution science, concluding probabilities and costs-severities of links as well as identifying potential ways for its improvement.
- July
  - Scientists report that heatwaves in western Europe are increasing "three-to-four times faster compared to the rest of the northern midlatitudes over the past 42 years" and that certain atmospheric dynamical changes can explain their increase.
  - A study shows that climate change-related exceptional marine heatwaves in the Mediterranean Sea during 2015–2019 resulted in widespread mass sealife die-offs in five consecutive years.
  - A research team, from the University of Oklahoma, National Severe Storms Laboratory, and University of Alabama in Huntsville was funded by the National Oceanic and Atmospheric Administration to investigate a stretch 8.7 miles (14 km) of the 2019 Greenwood Springs, Mississippi EF2 tornado where the National Weather Service was unable to survey. In their survey, published in Monthly Weather Review, they note that the tornado "produced forest devastation and electrical infrastructure damage up to at least EF4 intensity" and conclude by writing that "the Greenwood Springs event was a violent tornado, potentially even EF5 intensity."
- August – The National Centers for Environmental Information publish a report called Assessing the Global Climate in July 2022, where they state an all-time record cold temperature occurred in Australia during the month. On October 7, 2022, Zack Labe, a climate scientist for the NOAA Geophysical Fluid Dynamics Laboratory released a statement and a climate report from Berkeley Earth on the average monthly temperature, tweeting, "There are still no areas of record cold so far in 2022." Labe's statement also denied the record cold temperatures in Brazil, reported by the National Institute of Meteorology in May 2022, a month before the official start of winter, was also not record cold temperatures.
- September
  - Category 5 Hurricane Ian strikes Florida, causing $113 billion in damage, making it the costliest hurricane in Florida history and third costliest hurricane to ever strike the United States.
  - NOAA conducts the first successful launch of the Altius-600 small uncrewed aircraft system into Hurricane Ian, which records winds up to 216 miles per hour (348 km/h).
- October – Timothy Marshall, a meteorologist, structural and forensic engineer; Zachary B. Wienhoff, with Haag Engineering Company; Christine L. Wielgos, a meteorologist at the National Weather Service of Paducah; and Brian E. Smith, a meteorologist at the National Weather Service of Omaha, publish a detailed damage survey and analysis of the 2021 Western Kentucky tornado.

=== 2023 ===
- January
  - Perseverance provides the first ever detailed weather report on Mars.
  - The 2023 Pasadena–Deer Park tornado prompts the National Weather Service forecasting office in Houston to issue a rare tornado emergency, the first ever issued by the office.
- February
  - Elizabeth Leitman becomes the first woman to issue a convective watch from the Storm Prediction Center.
  - February–March – Cyclone Freddy becomes the longest-lasting and highest-ACE-producing tropical cyclone ever recorded worldwide, traveling across the southern Indian Ocean, Mozambique, and Madagascar for 36 days and producing 87.01 units of ACE.
- April
  - The TORNADO Act was introduced by U.S. Senator Roger Wicker as well as eight other senators from the 118th United States Congress.
  - Researchers with the University of Western Ontario's Northern Tornado Project (NTP) and the University of Illinois Urbana-Champaign (UIUC) published an assessment of the 2018 Alonsa, Manitoba EF4 tornado, in which they assess that the tornado may have had EF5-intensity winds.
  - Meteorologists at the National Hurricane Center publish a 72-page report on Hurricane Ian in 2022.
- July – The International Fujita scale (IF-scale) is officially published.
- September – The National Weather Service offices in Jackson, Mississippi and Nashville, Tennessee, along with the National Severe Storms Laboratory (NSSL) and the University of Oklahoma's CIWRO publish a joint damage survey and analysis on the 2023 Rolling Fork–Silver City EF4 tornado, the 2023 Black Hawk–Winona EF3 tornado, and the 2023 New Wren–Amory EF3 tornado.
- November – American meteorologist and tornado expert Thomas P. Grazulis publish Significant Tornadoes 1974–2022, which includes the outbreak intensity score (OIS), a new way to classify and rank tornado outbreaks.
- December 2023 – April 2024 – The Detecting and Evaluating Low-level Tornado Attributes (DELTA) project, led by NOAA, along with the National Severe Storms Laboratory and several research universities, occurred.

=== 2024 ===
- January – A study by the Northern Tornadoes Project and the University of Western Ontario released information on Treefall Identification and Direction Analysis (TrIDA) maps, a new artificial intelligence (A.I.) application tested using Canadian tornadoes as the machine learning data. TrIDA maps had approximately 80% verification rates.
- February
  - Researchers with the University of Tennessee and University of Missouri publish an academic study about how survivors from the 2011 Joplin tornado recover from "Tornado Brain", a new term for the PTSD of tornado survivors.
  - Researchers with Auburn University (AU), Florida International University (FIU), Pennsylvania State University (Penn State), Louisiana State University (LSU), University of South Alabama, University of Illinois Urbana-Champaign (UIUC), University of Kentucky, and CoreLogic, published an academic case study on how hurricane-resistant houses performed during the 2022 Arabi–New Orleans EF3 tornado.
  - A study by the Lawrence Berkeley National Laboratory and the University of Wisconsin–Madison was published in the Proceedings of the National Academy of Sciences which proposed adding a "Category 6" to the Saffir–Simpson hurricane wind scale to adequately convey storms' risk to the public, the researchers noting a number of storms have already achieved that intensity.
- March
  - Anthony W. Lyza, Matthew D. Flournoy, and A. Addison Alford, researchers with the National Severe Storms Laboratory, Storm Prediction Center, CIWRO, and the University of Oklahoma's School of Meteorology, published a paper titled Comparison of Tornado Damage Characteristics to Low-Altitude WSR-88D Radar Observations and Implications for Tornado Intensity Estimation. In the paper, the authors state, ">20% of supercell tornadoes may be capable of producing EF4–EF5 damage" and that "the legacy F-scale wind speed ranges may ultimately provide a better estimate of peak tornado wind speeds at 10–15 m AGL for strong–violent tornadoes and a better damage-based intensity rating for all tornadoes".
  - Researchers from the University of Massachusetts Lowell, University Corporation for Atmospheric Research (UCAR), and the NOAA National Hurricane Center published a case study regarding the forecasting of Hurricane Ian in September 2022.
  - A study published by the University of California, San Diego, in Nature, concluded that accelerated melting of ice in Greenland and Antarctica has decreased Earth's rotational velocity, affecting Coordinated Universal Time (UTC) adjustments and causing problems for computer networks that rely on UTC.
- April
  - The United States House of Representatives passed The Weather Act Reauthorization.
  - The European Severe Storms Laboratory and the Czech Hydrometeorological Institute, along with seven other European organizations, publish a detailed damage survey and analysis on the 2021 South Moravia tornado using the International Fujita scale.
  - Timothy A. Coleman, with the University of Alabama in Huntsville (UAH), Richard L. Thompson with the NOAA Storm Prediction Center, and Dr. Gregory S. Forbes, a retired meteorologist from The Weather Channel publish an article to the Journal of Applied Meteorology and Climatology stating, "it is apparent that the perceived shift in tornado activity from the traditional tornado alley in the Great Plains to the eastern U.S. is indeed real".
- May
  - Researchers with the Ocean University of China's College of Oceanic and Atmospheric Sciences and Physical Oceanography Laboratory published an article to the American Meteorological Society explaining how the Indian Ocean Dipole (IOD), which was first discovered in 1999, has two distinct patterns: "the coastal IOD and the offshore IOD".
  - Robby Frost, Colin Welty, and James Ruppert with the University of Oklahoma's School of Meteorology (OU SoM) published a case study to the American Meteorological Society on how the low-level jet stream influenced Tropical Storm Erin in 2007.

== See also ==
- Timeline of meteorology
- Meteorology
- Glossary of meteorology
- Outline of meteorology
- Atlantic hurricane season
- North Indian Ocean tropical cyclone
- Pacific hurricane
- Pacific typhoon climatology
- Timeline of temperature and pressure measurement technology
- History of tornado research
