= Sviny =

Sviny may refer to places in the Czech Republic:

- Sviny (Tábor District), a municipality and village in the South Bohemian Region
- Sviny (Žďár nad Sázavou District), a municipality and village in the Vysočina Region
- Trhové Sviny, a town in the South Bohemian Region
