= European Storm Forecast Experiment =

European weather forecasting initiative

The European Storm Forecast Experiment, known as ESTOFEX, is an initiative of a team of European meteorologists, and students in meteorology founded in 2002. It serves as a platform for exchange of knowledge about forecasting severe convective storms in Europe and elsewhere. It is a voluntary organisation and is currently unfunded. It aims to raise awareness and provide real-time education about severe weather forecasting. ESTOFEX issues storm warnings on a semi-daily basis. It also collects reports from the general public about severe convective weather incidents in order to validate its forecasts. Reports should be submitted to the European Severe Weather Database (ESWD).

ESTOFEX forecasts are published under a Creative Commons Attribution-Noncommercial-Share Alike 3.0 license.

Its definitions of severe convective weather phenomena are one or several of the following :

severe:

- hail with a diameter of at least 2.0 cm (0.8 in),
- tornado,
- wind gusts with a speed of at least 25 m/s (49 kn),
- excessive rainfall of at least 60 mm (2.4 in).

extremely severe :

- hail with a diameter of at least 5.0 cm (2.0 in),
- wind gusts with a speed of at least 33 m/s (64 kn),
- a tornado of IF2 intensity or higher on the International Fujita scale.

As an organization that is more focused on operational meteorology, i.e. weather forecasting, ESTOFEX functions somewhat as a counterpart to the US Storm Prediction Center (SPC). The research oriented correlate is the European Severe Storms Laboratory (ESSL) which itself is modeled somewhat after the US National Severe Storms Laboratory (NSSL), with both US counterparts enjoying stronger institutional support as long-time governmental entities.
