= İncekum Nature Park =

Protected area in Turkey

İmcekum Nature Park
- İncekum Tabiat Parkı
- Location within Turkey
- Location: Alanya, Antalya Province, Turkey
- Coordinates: 36°37′38″N 31°45′26″E
- Area: 271 ha (670 acres)
- Established: 2006; 20 years ago
- Governing body: Directorate-General of Nature Protection and National Parks; Ministry of Environment and Forest

İncekum Nature Park (Turkish: İncekum Tabiat Parkı) is a nature park in Turkey. It is in Avsallar town, on the Mediterranean Sea side between Antalya and Alanya to the south of the Turkish state highway D.400 connecting Antalya to Mersin. Its distance to Alanya is 24 kilometres (15 mi)

The nature Park consists of two sections. The first section was a picnic area and the second section was the training center of the Ministry of Forestry. In 2003 they were combined and in 2006 they were declared a nature park.

The total area of the nature park is 271 hectares (670 acres). The flora of the park consists of palm tree, oleander, acacia, laurus, sandalwood and oak.
