= František Němec (cinematographer) =

Czech cinematography (1932–2025)

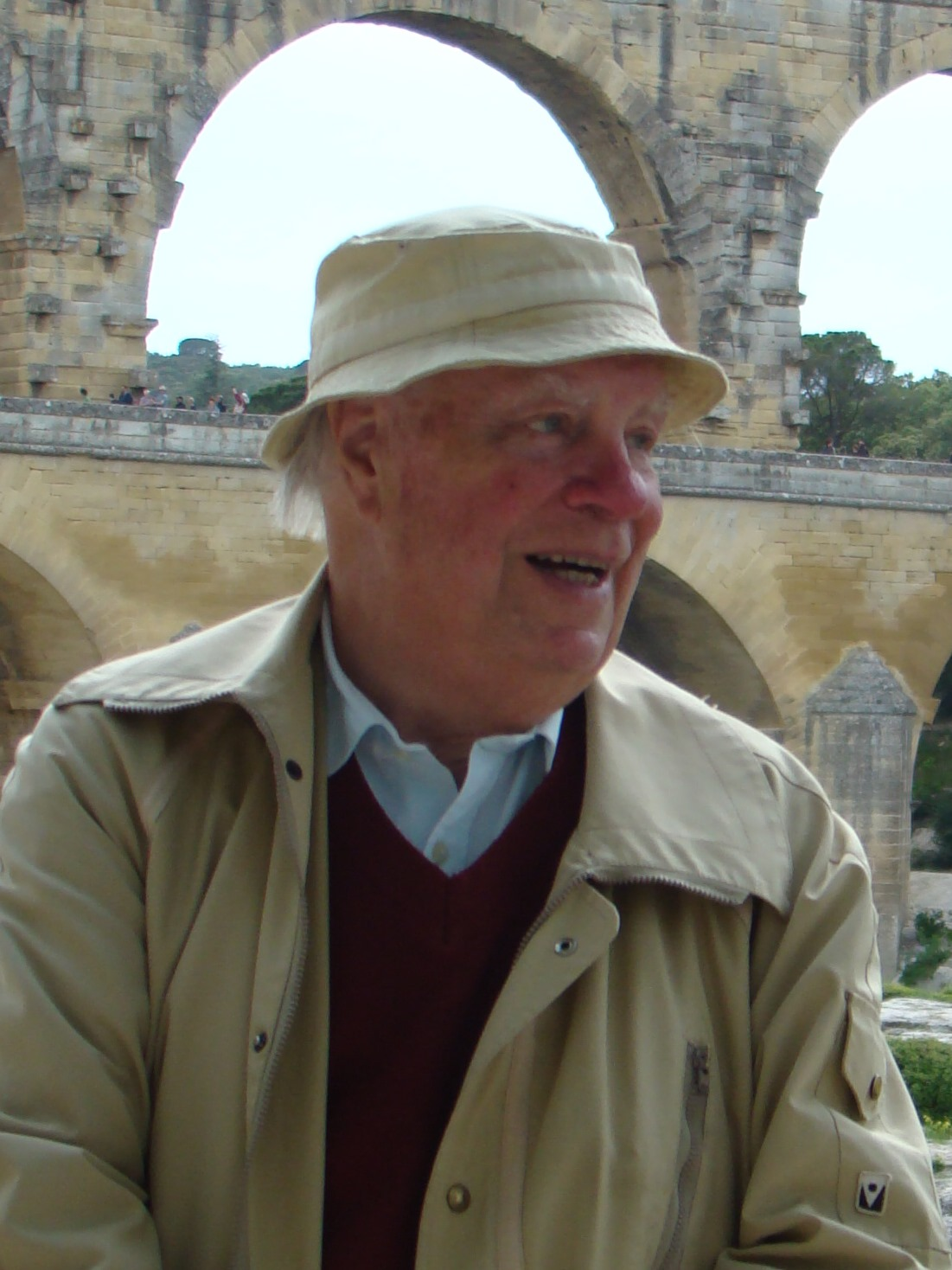
- Němec in 2012
- Born: 20 November 1932; Hodonín, Czechoslovakia
- Died: 31 August 2025 (aged 92); Czech Republic
- Occupation: Cinematographer

František Němec (20 November 1932 – 31 August 2025) was a Czech cinematographer and photographer.

== Life and work ==
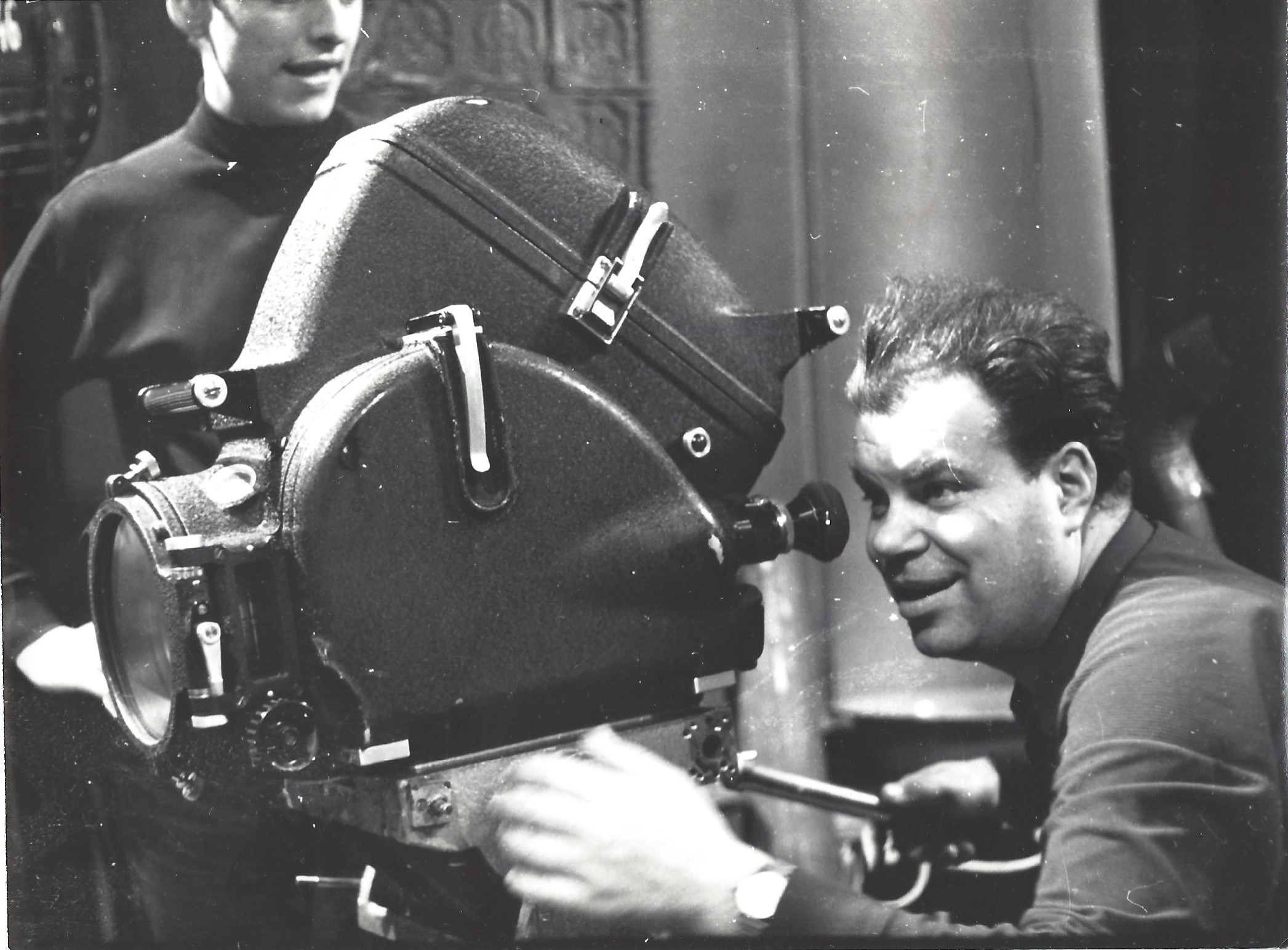
Němec behind the camera in a studio

Němec was born on 20 November 1932 in Hodonín in what was then Czechoslovakia. Later, he moved with his family to Prague, where he studied at the Department of Film and Television Image at Film and TV School of the Academy of Performing Arts in Prague (FAMU) under Professor Jan Stallich. After graduating in 1959, he joined Czech Television as a cameraman. During his time at Czech Television, he focused mainly on filming fairy tales and programs for children, including the well-known bedtime story series Krkonošské pohádky (Krkonoše Fairy Tales) or the popular fairy tale About the Princess Who Ratcheted. During the beginning of his career he created interpretations of classic literary works, such as the production of Evženie Grandetová (adaptation of Eugénie Grandet; 1966) or the TV series Jana Eyrová (adaptation of Jane Eyre; 1973).

In addition to his profession as a cameraman, he also devoted himself to photography and during his travels he took a plethora of pictures documenting important places, monuments and natural scenery throughout Europe. He was a member of the Association of Czech Cinematographers (AČK) and the Film and Television Association (FITES). In 2013, he received the Lifetime Achievement Award at the Zlín Film Festival.

On 23 February 2017, Němec received the DILIA Lifetime Achievement Award at the Lucerna cinema. At the suggestion of its presidium, it was awarded to him by the Association of Czech Cinematographers.

Němec died on 31 August 2025, at the age of 92.
