= Lužice (Hodonín District) =

- Municipality
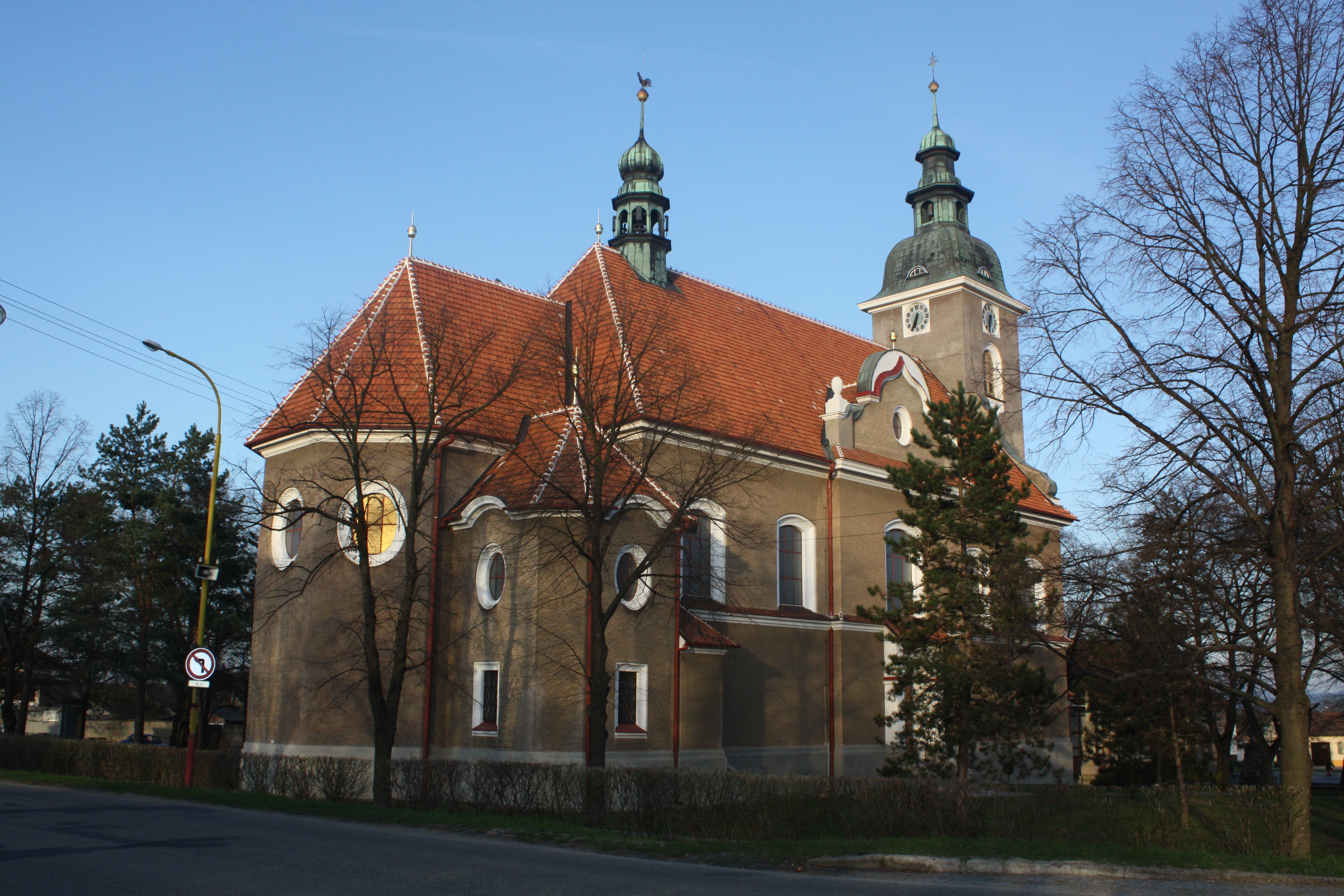
- Church of Saints Cyril and Methodius

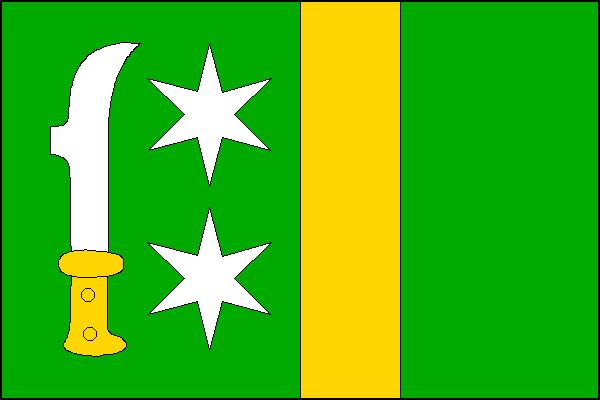
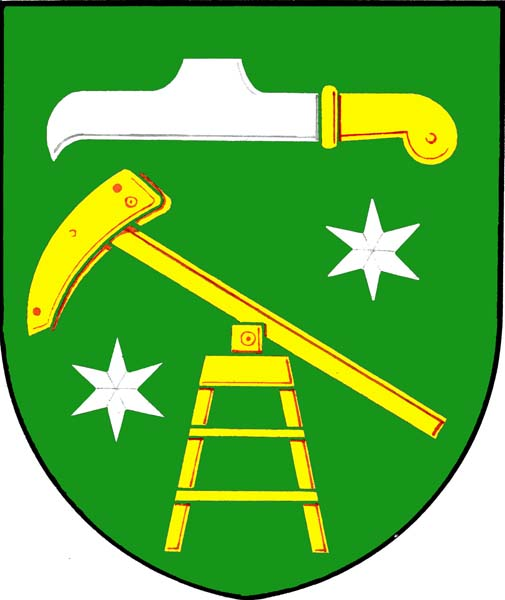
- Flag Coat of arms

- Location in the Czech Republic
- Coordinates: 48°50′28″N 17°4′16″E
- Country: Czech Republic
- Region: South Moravian
- District: Hodonín
- First mentioned: 1250

Area
  - Total: 7.62 km^{2} (2.94 sq mi)
- Elevation: 176 m (577 ft)

Population (2026-01-01)
  - Total: 2,911
  - Density: 382/km^{2} (989/sq mi)
- Time zone: UTC+1 (CET)
  - Summer (DST): UTC+2 (CEST)
- Postal code: 696 18
- Website: www.luziceuhodonina.cz

Lužice (German: Luschitz) is a municipality and village in Hodonín District in the South Moravian Region of the Czech Republic. It has about 2,900 inhabitants.

== Geography ==
Lužice is located about 3 kilometres (2 mi) west of Hodonín and 50 km (31 mi) southeast of Brno. It lies in a flat landscape in the Lower Morava Valley. The Kyjovka River flows through the municipality.

== History ==
The first written mention of Lužice is from 1250. From 1511, it was part of the Hodonín estate. Until the industrialisation in the 19th century, it was an agricultural village. From 1840 to 1931, lignite was mined here. The railway was built in 1841. A large glass factory operated in Lužice from 1870 to 1933.

The municipality was heavily damaged by the 2021 South Moravia tornado.

== Demographics ==
Historical population

Year	Pop.	±%
1869	972	—
1880	1,479	+52.2%
1890	1,688	+14.1%
1900	1,742	+3.2%
1910	2,076	+19.2%

Year	Pop.	±%
1921	2,245	+8.1%
1930	2,136	−4.9%
1950	2,061	−3.5%
1961	2,530	+22.8%
1970	2,641	+4.4%

Year	Pop.	±%
1980	2,669	+1.1%
1991	2,515	−5.8%
2001	2,742	+9.0%
2011	2,781	+1.4%
2021	2,804	+0.8%

Source: Censuses

== Economy ==
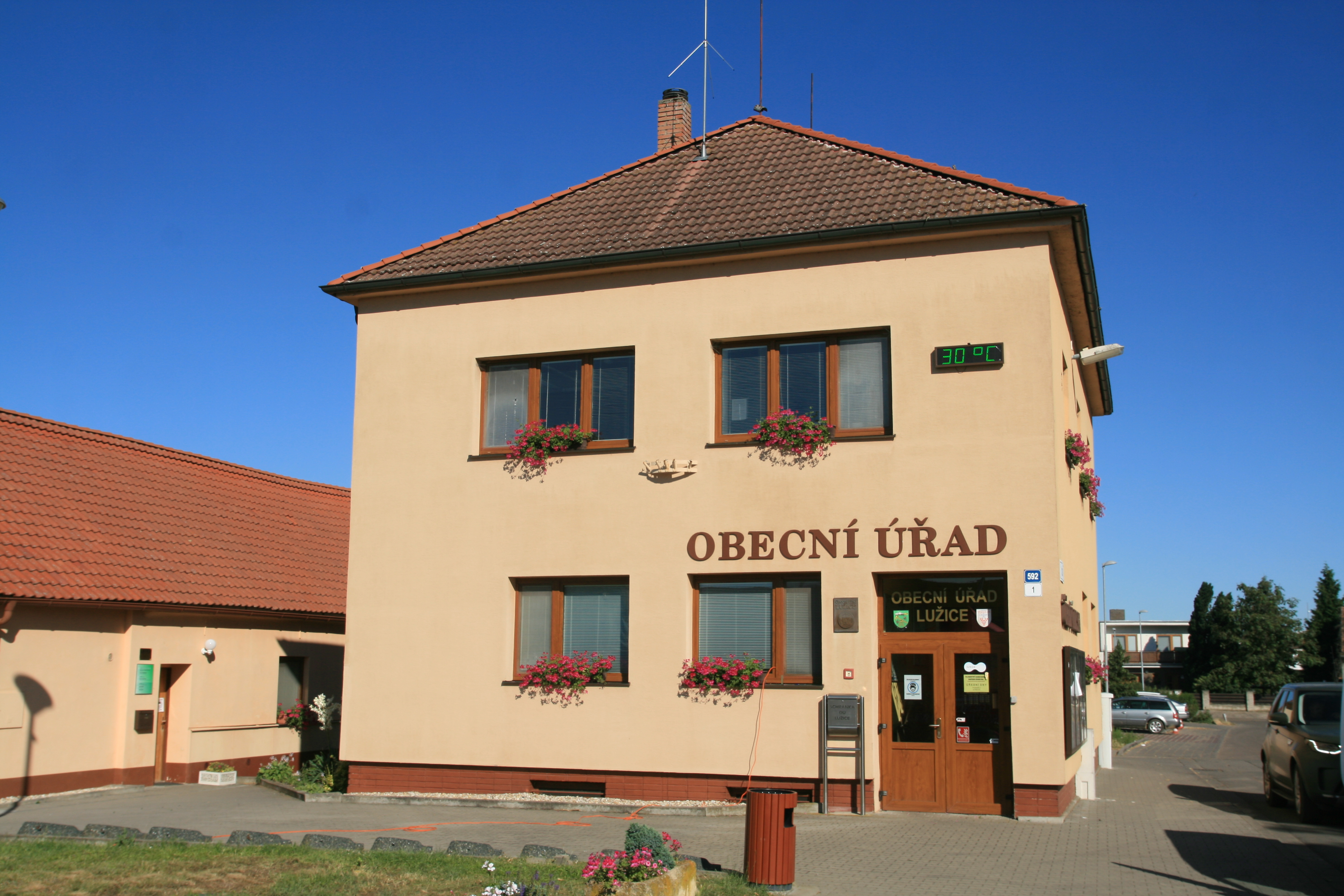
Municipal office

Lužice is known for viticulture. The municipality lies in the Slovácká wine subregion.

== Transport ==
The I/55 road (the section from Břeclav to Hodonín) runs through the municipal territory.

Lužice is located on the railway line Přerov–Břeclav.

== Sights ==
The only protected cultural monument in the municipality is a sculptural group of the Pietà, dating from 1725.

The main landmark of Lužice is the Church of Saints Cyril and Methodius. It was built in 1874.
