= Librantowa =

- Village
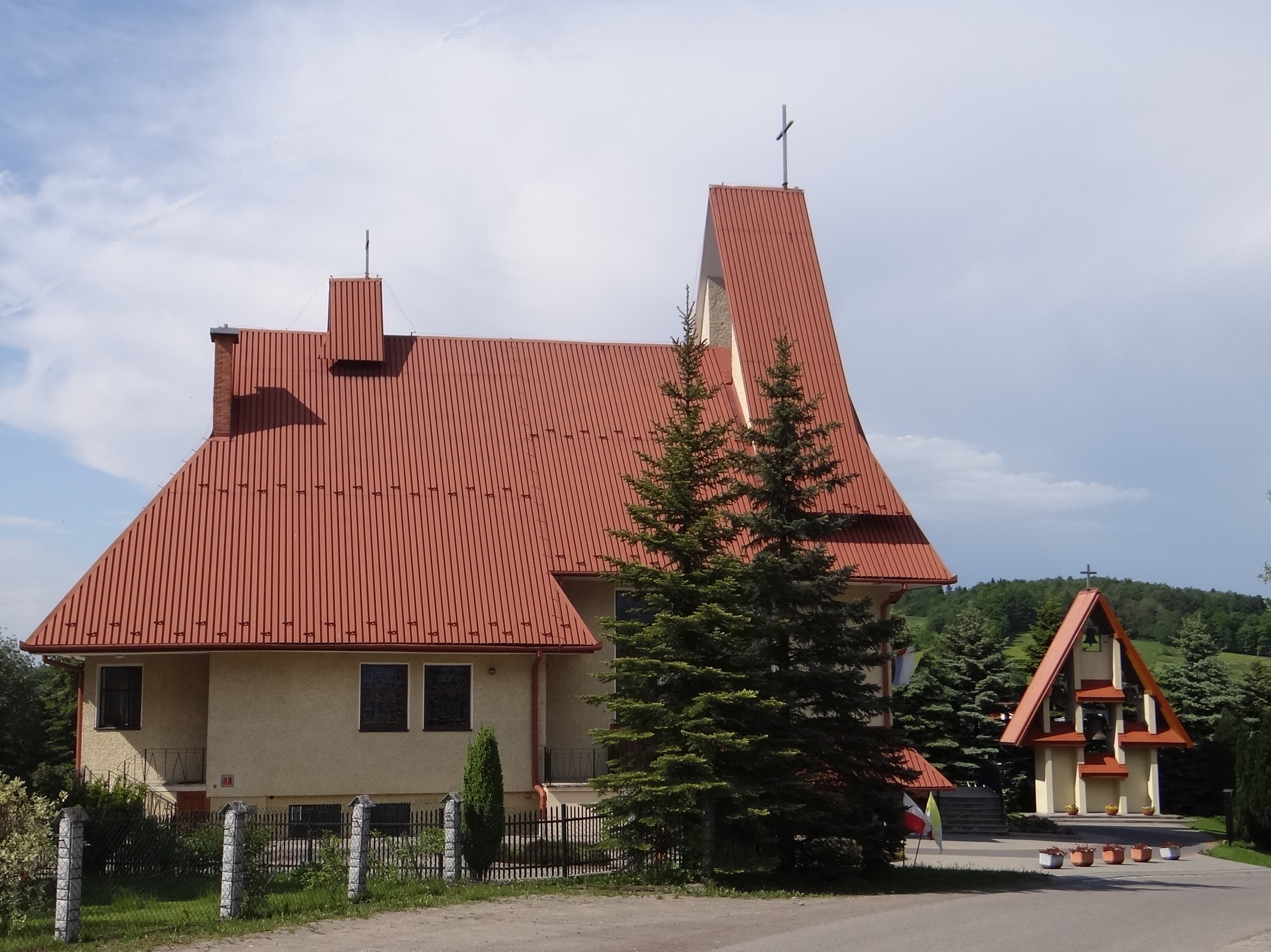
- Church of Saint Albert Chmielowski

- Location within Poland
- Coordinates: 49°39′57″N 20°45′19″E
- Country: Poland
- Voivodeship: Lesser Poland
- County: Nowy Sącz
- Gmina: Chełmiec

Population
  - Total: 1,099

Librantowa [libranˈtɔva] is a village in the administrative district of Gmina Chełmiec, within Nowy Sącz County, Lesser Poland Voivodeship, in southern Poland.

In the June 2021 European tornado outbreak, the village was struck by a tornado rated F2 on the Fujita scale
