= Hodonín Zoo =

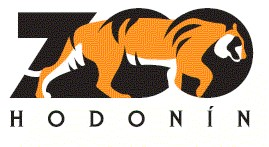

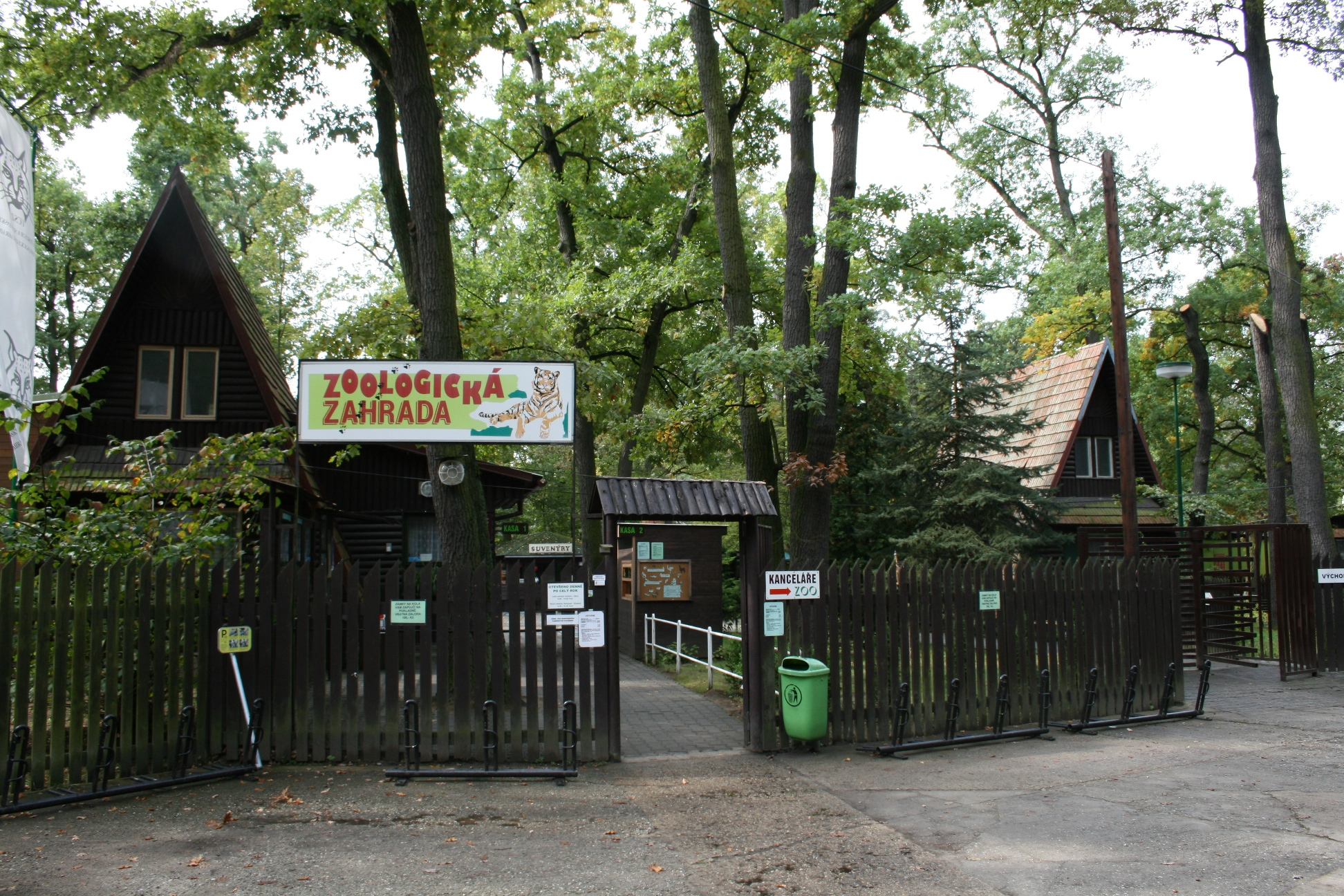
- Entrance
- Interactive map of Hodonín Zoo
- 48°51′50″N 17°06′20″E
- Date opened: 1977
- Location: U Červených domků 3529; 695 01 Hodonín
- Land area: 7.5 hectares
- No. of animals: 900
- No. of species: 250
- Memberships: EAZA
- Website: www.zoo-hodonin.cz

Hodonín Zoo is a zoo, located on the northwestern outskirts of Hodonín in the South Moravian Region of the Czech Republic.

== History ==
Hodonín Zoo was created on the initiative of the former City National Committee, chaired by Emil Schwarz. Founded in 1976, the zoo was partly open to but officially opened on 29 September 1977.

On 24 June 2021, Hodonín Zoo was severely impacted by the F4 2021 South Moravia tornado.
