= Moravská Nová Ves =

- Market town
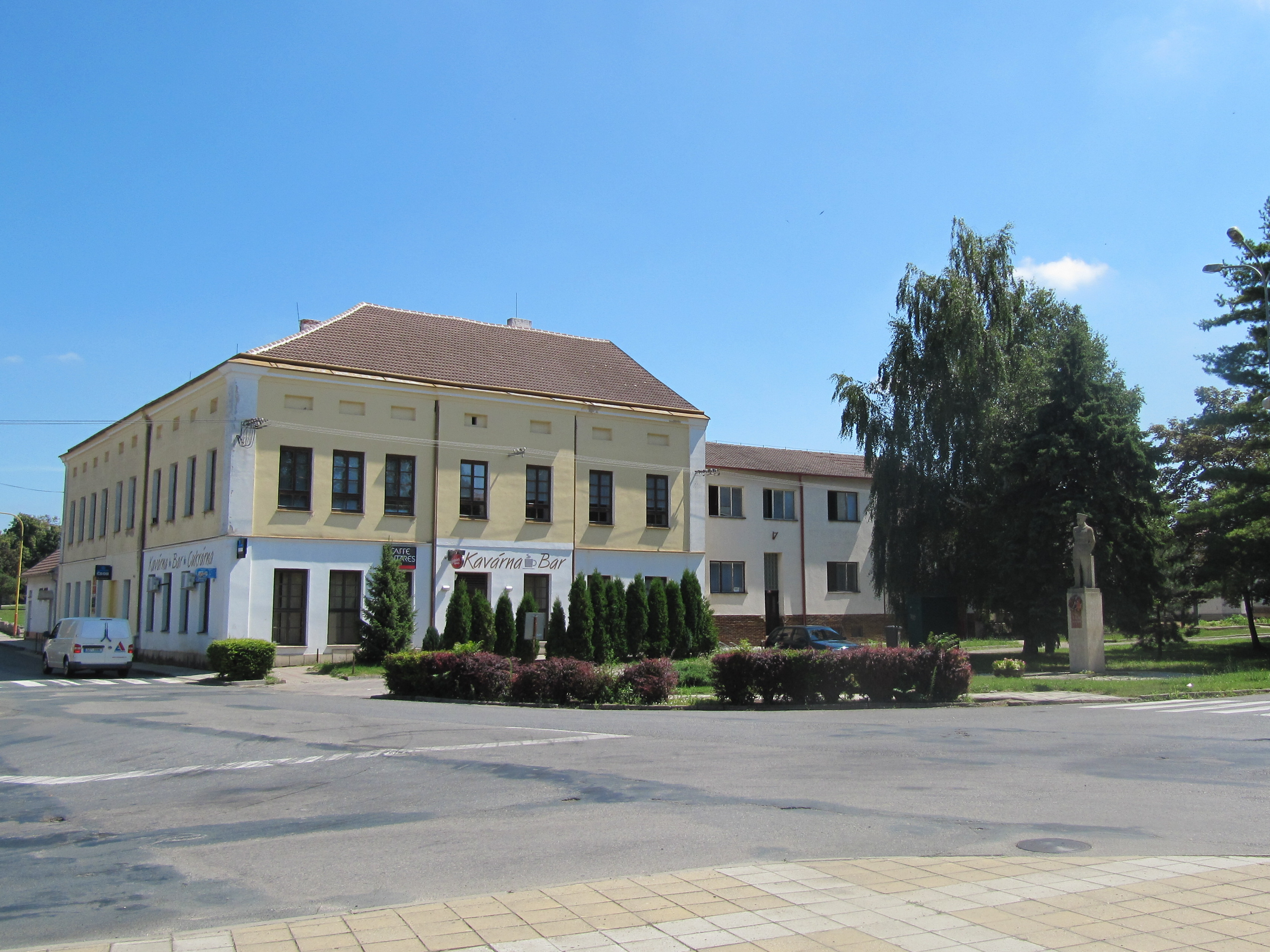
- Centre of Moravská Nová Ves

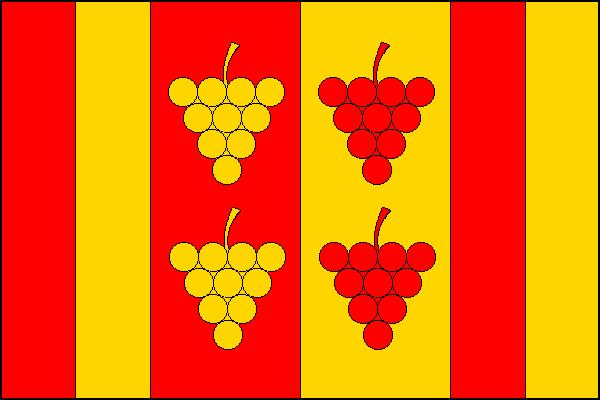
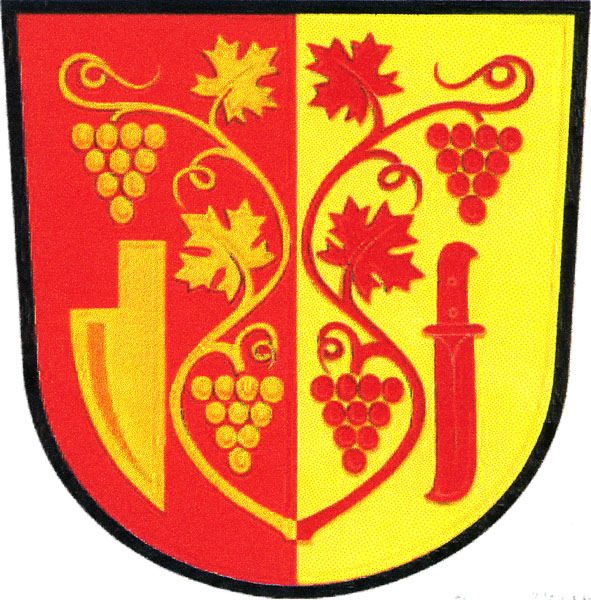
- Flag Coat of arms

- Location in the Czech Republic
- Coordinates: 48°48′7″N 17°1′24″E
- Country: Czech Republic
- Region: South Moravian
- District: Břeclav
- First mentioned: 1261

Area
  - Total: 23.41 km^{2} (9.04 sq mi)
- Elevation: 190 m (620 ft)

Population (2026-01-01)
  - Total: 2,690
  - Density: 115/km^{2} (298/sq mi)
- Time zone: UTC+1 (CET)
  - Summer (DST): UTC+2 (CEST)
- Postal code: 691 55
- Website: www.mnves.cz

Moravská Nová Ves (Czech pronunciation: [ˈmorafskaː ˈnovaː ˈvɛs]; until 1911 Nová Ves; German: Mährisch Neudorf) is a market town in Břeclav District in the South Moravian Region of the Czech Republic. It has about 2,700 inhabitants.

== Etymology ==
The name means 'Moravian new village' in Czech.

== Geography ==
Moravská Nová Ves is located about 10 kilometres (6 mi) northeast of Břeclav and 51 km (32 mi) southeast of Brno, on the border with Slovakia. It lies in a flat landscape of the Lower Morava Valley. The municipality is crossed by the Kyjovka River. The Czech–Slovak border is formed here by the Morava River.

== History ==
The first written mention of Nová Ves is from 1261. The settlement was founded shortly before by the Cistercian monastery in Velehrad. Located near the Moravian-Hungarian border, the village was constantly threatened by raids from the Kingdom of Hungary, which hindered its development. This state lasted until the 18th century. After that, Nová Ves began to develop and in 1807 it was promoted to a market town. Since 1911, it has been using the name Moravská Nová Ves.

Moravská Nová Ves was heavily damaged by the 2021 South Moravia tornado.

== Demographics ==
Historical population

Year	Pop.	±%
1869	1,887	—
1880	2,099	+11.2%
1890	2,277	+8.5%
1900	2,397	+5.3%
1910	2,697	+12.5%

Year	Pop.	±%
1921	2,883	+6.9%
1930	2,914	+1.1%
1950	2,953	+1.3%
1961	3,043	+3.0%
1970	2,774	−8.8%

Year	Pop.	±%
1980	2,650	−4.5%
1991	2,557	−3.5%
2001	2,528	−1.1%
2011	2,514	−0.6%
2021	2,495	−0.8%

Source: Censuses

== Economy ==
Moravská Nová Ves is known for viticulture and winemaking. It lies in the Slovácká wine subregion.

== Transport ==
The I/55 road (the section from Břeclav to Hodonín) runs through the municipal territory.

Moravská Nová Ves is located on the railway line Přerov–Břeclav.

== Sights ==
The main landmark of the market town is the Church of Saint James the Great. It was built in 1771–1773, on the site of an older church. The tower survived from the original building and was raised during the construction of the new church.
