= International Fujita scale =

Tornado rating system

The International Fujita scale (abbreviated as IF-Scale) is a scale that rates the intensity of tornadoes and other wind events based on the severity of the damage they cause. It is used by the European Severe Storms Laboratory (ESSL) and various other organizations including Deutscher Wetterdienst (DWD) and State Meteorological Agency (AEMET). The scale is intended to be analogous to the Fujita and Enhanced Fujita scales, while being more applicable internationally by accounting for factors such as differences in building codes.

In 2018, the first draft version of the IF-scale, version 0.10 was published. This version was based on a 12-step rating scale. Over the next few years, dozens of tornadoes would be rated on this version of the scale. Most notably, the 2021 South Moravia tornado received a rating (IF4) and full damage survey on the IF-scale conducted by ESSL, the Czech Hydrometeorological Institute and four other organizations. On May 6, 2023, version 0.99.9d was published, which changed it to a 9-step rating scale. In late July 2023, the first official version of the IF scale was published.

== 2018 version ==
Tornado rating classifications
IF0−	IF0	IF0+	IF1−	IF1	IF1+	IF2−	IF2	IF2+	IF3	IF4	IF5
Weak						Strong				Violent	
						Significant					
									Intense		

=== Parameters ===
The 12 categories for the International Fujita scale are listed below, in order of increasing intensity. Although the wind speeds and photographic damage examples are updated, which are more or less still accurate. However, for the actual IF-scale in practice, damage indicators (the type of structure which has been damaged) are predominantly used in determining the tornado intensity. The IF-scale steps are defined by a central value and an error. The errors have been estimated to be 30% of the central value, resulting in overlapping speed ranges. The distances between the central values of the steps have been so chosen that the upper bound exceeds the central value of the next step, ensuring a balance between the resolution of the scale and the expected errors. Since ESSL required that the steps be consistent with the original Fujita scale, they introduced steps with − and + suffixes indicating steps one third higher or lower than the central value of the original scale, e.g. IF2− equals "IF2 − 1/3IF2" and IF2+ equals "IF2 + 1/3IF2". Above F2, such a subdivision was not introduced and only full steps are used.

Scale	Wind speed (Estimated)		
Scale	mph	km/h	m/s
IF0−	45 ± 14	72 ± 22	20 ± 6
IF0	56 ± 17	90 ± 27	25 ± 7
IF0+	67 ± 20	108 ± 32	30 ± 9
IF1−	70 ± 24	128 ± 38	36 ± 11
IF1	92 ± 28	149 ± 45	41 ± 12
IF1+	106 ± 32	170 ± 51	47 ± 14
IF2−	120 ± 36	193 ± 58	54 ± 16
IF2	135 ± 40	217 ± 65	60 ± 18
IF2+	150 ± 45	241 ± 72	67 ± 20
IF3	182 ± 55	293 ± 88	81 ± 24
IF4	234 ± 70	376 ± 113	105 ± 31
IF5	290 ± 87	466 ± 140	130 ± 39

== 2023 version ==
On May 6, 2023, version 0.99.9d was published, which changed it to a 9-step rating scale. In this version, the wind speed damage indicator was introduced, which made it the first tornado intensity and damage scale to use measured wind speeds and Doppler weather radar measured wind speeds. When the first official publication of the IF scale, the 9-step rating scale was kept. It was noted that each scale's wind speed is to be taken with a 20% error margin on each side of the central value. This was done to ensure the lower or upper bound of the overlapping rating came close to the central value of the other rating.

Tornado rating classifications
IF0	IF0.5	IF1	IF1.5	IF2	IF2.5	IF3	IF4	IF5
Weak				Strong			Violent	
				Significant				
						Intense		

Scale	Wind speed (Estimated) (Central value; Full range of the 20% error margin)		
Scale	mph	km/h	m/s
IF0	55; 44–66	90; 72–108	25; 20–30
IF0.5	75; 60–90	120; 96–144	33; 27–40
IF1	90; 72–108	150; 120–180	40; 32–48
IF1.5	110; 88–132	180; 144–216	50; 40–60
IF2	135; 108–162	220; 176–264	60; 48–72
IF2.5	160; 128–192	250; 200–300	70; 56–84
IF3	180; 144–216	290; 232–348	80; 64–96
IF4	236; 184–276	380; 304–456	105; 84–126
IF5	290; 232–348	470; 376–564	130; 104–156

=== Damage indicators, subclasses, and degrees of damage ===
The IF scale currently has 23 damage indicators (DI), each with a varying number of subclasses and degrees of damage (DoD).

DI Abbr.	Damage indicator (DI)	Subclasses	Degrees of damage
BS	Building - structure	A, AB, B, C, D, E, F	0, 1A, 1B, 2
BR	Building - roof	A, AB, B, C, D, E, F	0, 1, 2
BN	Building - non-structural elements	SW, SS, TW, TS, HW, HS	0, 1, 2, 3
BM	Building - anchoring	SM, SI, DB	1
VH	Road Vehicles	C, E, L, T	0, 1, 2, 3, 4
TR	Trees	W, A, S	0, 1, 2, 3, 4, 5, 6, 7, 8, 9
TS	Tree stands	WA, S	0, 1, 2, 3, 4
WT	Wind turbines	A, S	0, 1, 2, 3
GH	Greenhouses	W, A, S	0, 1, 2, 3
TC	Train cars	S, F	0, 1
MH	Mobile homes / Static caravans	–	0, 1, 2, 3, 4, 5
PT	Poles and towers	W, S, T	0, 1, 2
SP	Solar Panels	–	0, 1
FC	Fences	W, S	0, 1
FW	Free-standing walls	Z, A, AB, B, C, D, E, F	1, 2
SN	Signs and billboards	T, M	0, 1, 2
SW	Connected scaffolding	–	1
CP	Carports / garages	–	1
SS	Service Station Canopies	–	0, 1, 2, 3
SC	Shipping Containers	A, B, C, D, E, F	1, 2, 3
CR	Cranes	G, t	1, 2
OF	Outdoor Furniture	L, H	0, 1, 2
WM	Wind Speed Measurement	See section below	See section below

=== DI: Wind Speed Measurement ===
A unique feature of the International Fujita scale compared to the Fujita or Enhanced Fujita scale is a new damage indicator based on measured wind speeds. For the IF scale, only wind speeds measured at or below 10 metres (11 yd) can be used to determine a rating. Doppler weather radar measurements are also able to be used to determine a rating if they are measured within damaging distance. For radar measurements, any readings below 60 metres (66 yd) can be used to determine a rating.

==== Three second measurement ====
For three-second wind speed measurements, it is assumed to be an average of 88.8% of the three-second measurement.

Degree of Damage (DoD) / Measured IF# Speed	Three Second Measurement		
Degree of Damage (DoD) / Measured IF# Speed	mph	km/h	m/s
DoD 0 / IF0	42.5–56	69–91	19–25
DoD 0.5 / IF0.5	57–74.5	92–120	26–32
DoD 1 / IF1	73.9–90	119–146	33–40
DoD 1.5 / IF1.5	91–109	147–176	40–49
DoD 2 / IF2	110–129	177–208	50–57
DoD 2.5 / IF2.5	129–156.5	209–242	58–70
DoD 3 / IF3	151–183.9	243–296	68–82
DoD 4 / IF4	184–231	297–373	83–103
DoD 5 / IF5	≥232	≥374	≥104

==== Two second measurement ====
For two-second wind speed measurements, it is assumed to be an average of 90.9% of the two-second measurement.

Degree of Damage (DoD) / Measured IF# Speed	Two Second Measurement		
Degree of Damage (DoD) / Measured IF# Speed	mph	km/h	m/s
DoD 0 / IF0	43.4–58	70–94	20–26
DoD 0.5 / IF0.5	59–74	95–120	27–33
DoD 1 / IF1	75–93	121–150	34–40
DoD 1.5 / IF1.5	93–111.8	150–180	42–50
DoD 2 / IF2	111.8–132	180–213	51–59
DoD 2.5 / IF2.5	133–154	214–248	60–68
DoD 3 / IF3	154–188	249–303	69–84
DoD 4 / IF4	188–237	304–382	85–106
DoD 5 / IF5	≥238	≥383	≥107

==== One second measurement ====
For one-second wind speed measurements, it is assumed to be an average of 92.5% of the one-second measurement.

Degree of Damage (DoD) / Measured IF# Speed	One Second Measurement		
Degree of Damage (DoD) / Measured IF# Speed	mph	km/h	m/s
DoD 0 / IF0	44.1–58	71–95	20–26
DoD 0.5 / IF0.5	59–76	96–123	27–34
DoD 1 / IF1	77–94	124–152	35–42
DoD 1.5 / IF1.5	95–113	153–183	43–51
DoD 2 / IF2	114–134	184–220	52–60
DoD 2.5 / IF2.5	135–156	218–252	61–70
DoD 3 / IF3	157–191	253–308	71–85
DoD 4 / IF4	192–241	309–388	86–107
DoD 5 / IF5	≥241.5	≥389	≥108

==== Zero second measurement ====
For zero-second wind speed measurements, it is assumed to be an instantaneous wind speed measurement. This can only be used if it was 10Hz or higher sample rate.

Degree of Damage (DoD) / Measured IF# Speed	Zero Second Measurement		
Degree of Damage (DoD) / Measured IF# Speed	mph	km/h	m/s
DoD 0 / IF0	47.8–64	77–103	22–28
DoD 0.5 / IF0.5	64–82	104–132	29–36
DoD 1 / IF1	82–101.9	133–164	37–45
DoD 1.5 / IF1.5	102–123	165–198	46–55
DoD 2 / IF2	124–145	199–234	56–65
DoD 2.5 / IF2.5	146–169	235–273	66–75
DoD 3 / IF3	170–207	274–333	76–92
DoD 4 / IF4	208–260	334–420	93–116
DoD 5 / IF5	≥261	≥421	≥117

== See also ==
- List of tornadoes rated on the International Fujita scale
- Beaufort scale
- Saffir–Simpson hurricane wind scale
- Severe weather terminology (United States)
- TORRO scale
- Tornado intensity and damage
- Enhanced Fujita scale
- Wind engineering
- Lists of tornadoes and tornado outbreaks
  - List of F5 and EF5 tornadoes
- Meteorology in the 21st century
