= Sviny (Žďár nad Sázavou District) =

- Municipality
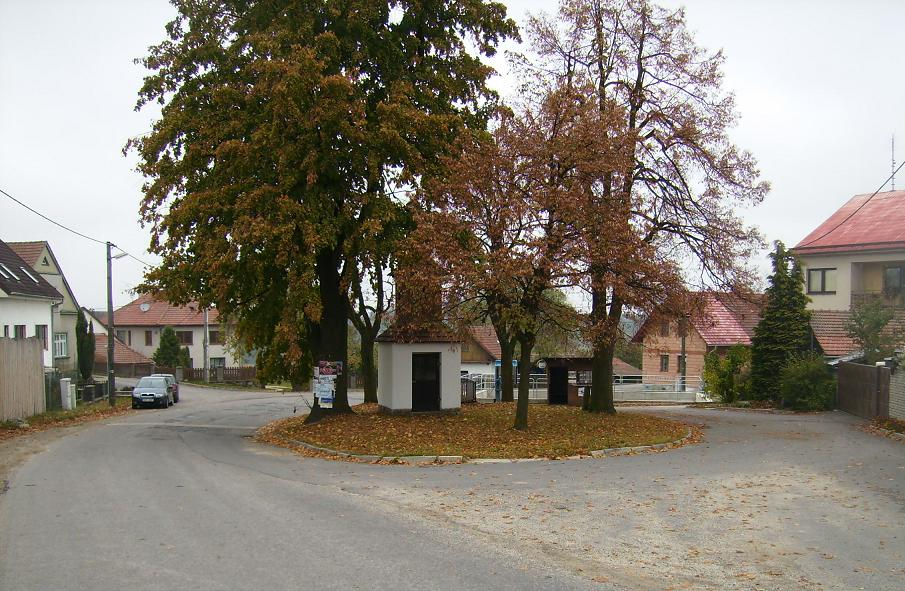
- Centre of Sviny

- Flag Coat of arms

- Location in the Czech Republic
- Coordinates: 49°21′51″N 16°5′6″E
- Country: Czech Republic
- Region: Vysočina
- District: Žďár nad Sázavou
- First mentioned: 1368

Area
  - Total: 3.71 km^{2} (1.43 sq mi)
- Elevation: 590 m (1,940 ft)

Population (2026-01-01)
  - Total: 118
  - Density: 31.8/km^{2} (82.4/sq mi)
- Time zone: UTC+1 (CET)
  - Summer (DST): UTC+2 (CEST)
- Postal code: 594 51
- Website: www.obecsviny.cz

Sviny is a municipality and village in Žďár nad Sázavou District in the Vysočina Region of the Czech Republic. It has about 100 inhabitants.

Sviny lies approximately 26 kilometres (16 mi) south-east of Žďár nad Sázavou, 37 km (23 mi) east of Jihlava, and 146 km (91 mi) south-east of Prague.

== Demographics ==
Historical population
Year	Pop.	±%
1869	156	—
1880	154	−1.3%
1890	165	+7.1%
1900	143	−13.3%
1910	148	+3.5%
1921	149	+0.7%
1930	160	+7.4%
1950	109	−31.9%
1961	114	+4.6%
1970	121	+6.1%
1980	100	−17.4%
1991	102	+2.0%
2001	110	+7.8%
2011	103	−6.4%
2021	110	+6.8%
Source: Censuses
