= European Severe Storms Laboratory =

Organization

- ESSL logo
- Abbreviation: ESSL
- Predecessor: TorDACH
- Formation: 12 August 2006
- Type: NGO
- Purpose: advance research on extreme weather events on a European level
- Location: c/o DLR, Münchener Str. 20, 82234 Wessling, Germany
- Region served: Europe
- Official language: English
- Director: Pieter Groenemeijer
- Treasurer and Director of Operations: Alois M. Holzer
- Main organ: General Assembly
- Website: ESSL

The European Severe Storms Laboratory (ESSL) is a scientific organisation that conducts research on severe convective storms, tornadoes, intense precipitation events, and avalanches across Europe and the Mediterranean. It operates the widely consulted European Severe Weather Database (ESWD).

== History and purpose of the ESSL ==
The European Severe Storms Laboratory started as an informal network of European scientists with the goal to advance research on severe convective storms and extreme weather events on a European level. It was initiated in 2002 by Nikolai Dotzek and became a non-profit organization with charitable status in 2006.

The ESSL focuses on research questions concerning convective storms and other extreme weather phenomena which can be treated more efficiently on a pan-European scale. It can be seen as roughly the European counterpart to the US's National Severe Storms Laboratory (NSSL). Some members of ESSL participate in the European Storm Forecast Experiment (ESTOFEX) which issues daily forecasts of severe convective storms. It can be seen as the operational counterpart to the US Storm Prediction Center (SPC) akin to ESSL being the research counterpart to NSSL, although both European organizations currently lack the institutional support enjoyed by the US organisations which are government entities.

The statutory purposes of the ESSL are:

- to advance research on severe convective storms and extreme weather events on a European level
- to operate and extend the European Severe Weather Database (ESWD)
- to support or organize the European Conferences on Severe Storms

== Projects, research and development ==
=== European Severe Weather Database ===
The European Severe Weather Database (ESWD) collects and verifies reports on dust, sand- or steam devils, tornadoes, gustnadoes, large hail, heavy rain and snowfall, severe wind gusts, damaging lightning strikes and avalanches all over Europe and around the Mediterranean. The ESWD is the most important database for such events in Europe. Everyone is welcome to report extreme weather observations. Each report undergoes a quality control and each event is flagged either as received (QC0), plausibility checked (QC0+), report confirmed by reliable source (QC1) or as scientific case study (QC2). QC0+ Are events that are very likely to have occurred, but some details, such as their exact time, precise location, or report characteristics are unknown or uncertain. QC1 means that the events and reported contents have been confirmed. QC2 means that the events and reported contents are confirmed and have been subject of a scientific case study. Extraordinary work has been performed to verify the validity of all pieces of information given in a certain report based on detailed case studies on a scientific level. Therefore QC2 is relatively rare compared to QC1.

=== European Weather Observer ===
The European Weather Observer (EWOB) is a project similar to NSSL's Mping project. It's a database with real time reports of weather, severe weather and its impacts. The database is filled by reports relayed to ESSL by its partners as well as the EWOB app. Scientists will use the data to find out how they can best use data from meteorological satellites and radars to best predict severe weather. Weather observations by human beings are indispensable to develop relationships between what satellites and radars see and what kind of weather is actually happening on the ground. EWOB was released on December 15, 2015. Weather forecasters have to deal with the problem that satellites cannot see what happens under a storm cloud, radars do not scan close to the Earth’s surface and that measurements from their observation stations are far apart. EWOB allows them to be aware that, e.g., a thunderstorm started to produce wind damage, or that the rain suddenly started to freeze on the road, which is crucial information for issuing timely weather warnings.

=== European Conference on Severe Storms ===
The European Conference on Severe Storms (ECSS) is a conference series organized by the ESSL since 2002 and taking place biannually. During the ECSS two prices are offered:

- The Heino-Tooming-Award is named after the meteorologist Heino Tooming († 2004) and awards excellent scientific work on severe storms in European collaborations.
- The Nikolai Dotzek Award is named after meteorologist Nikolai Dotzek and honors distinguished scientific individual performance or lifetime achievement.

=== ESSL Testbed ===
The ESSL Testbed is an annually returning event with the aim to enhance severe weather forecasting across Europe. A growing range of tools is steadily becoming available for weather forecasters as a basis for their forecasts and warnings. These are, however, not always used optimally, because of a lack of interaction between their developers and the forecasters. Additionally, there is a lack of international exchange of “best practices” on forecasting extreme weather events. Therefore, the ESSL Testbed, as a permanent facility, will bring together forecasters and developers from across the world: In a quasi-operational setting with a focus on severe weather, developers will present and explain their tools, forecasters give feedback, and the tools are put to the test. The core activity of the Testbed is the preparation of experimental severe weather forecasts. The ESSL Testbed was inspired by the HWT and its yearly “Spring Program”, organized by the Storm Prediction Center & NSSL.

=== Convective Hazard Evolution under Climate Change (CHECC) ===
ESSL is part of the ClimXtreme research network, funded by the German Ministry of Education and Research and carries out the project CHECC, part of ClimXtreme Module B.

Convective hazards such as large hail, severe wind gusts, tornadoes and heavy rainfall are responsible for high economic damages, fatalities and injuries across the world, in Europe, and in Germany. There are insufficient observations to determine whether trends in such local phenomena exist, but recent studies suggest that conditions associated with such hazards have become more frequent across large parts of Europe in recent decades. These conclusions are in part based on work with Additive Regression Convective Hazard Models (AR-CHaMo) that have been developed using state-of-the-art reanalysis data and observations collected in the European Severe Weather Database (ESWD).

The CHECC project improves AR-CHaMo by using newer reanalysis datasets with higher spatial and temporal resolutions, such as ERA5, COSMO-REA6 and MERRA2. The added resolution is expected to better resolve the conditions that give rise to the convective storms and hence to improved statistical models. More improvement is expected from additional observational data that is retrieved from media archives and thus enhances the severe weather database used for training the models. The robustness of the models will be investigated by applying them to different regions, e.g. Europe and a part of North America.

CHECC uses the models to investigate if significant trends in modelled hazard occurrence can be detected both in the past and in future climate projections. Furthermore, CHECC studies which part of these trends can be attributable to changes in tropospheric flow patterns, by assessing the impacts of any detected changes on the underlying physical drivers of convective events.

Finally, CHECC will explore the use of convection-permitting reanalysis data, such as COSMO-REA2. This is of particular interest as climate projections are gradually becoming available at convection-permitting module resolutions. As part of this section of the study, predictor parameters will need to be modified owing to the higher spatial resolution which requires proxies that describe the convective storms themselves rather than their respective mesoscale environment.

=== International Fujita scale ===
The International Fujita scale (IF scale) rates the intensity of tornadoes and other wind events based on the severity of the damage they cause. It is used by the European Severe Storms Laboratory and various other organizations including Deutscher Wetterdienst (DWD) and State Meteorological Agency (AEMET). The scale is intended to be analogous to the Fujita and Enhanced Fujita scales, while being more applicable internationally by accounting for factors such as differences in building codes.

In 2018, the first draft version of the IF-scale, version 0.10 was published. This version was based on a 12-step rating scale. Over the next few years, dozens of tornadoes would be rated on this version of the scale. Most notably, the 2021 South Moravia tornado received a rating (IF4) and full damage survey on the IF-scale conducted by ESSL, the Czech Hydrometeorological Institute and four other organizations. On May 6, 2023, version 0.99.9d was published, which changed it to a 9-step rating scale. In late July 2023, the first official version of the IF scale was published.

=== Automatic Severe Weather Prediction (AR-CHARMO) ===
On July 27, 2022, ESSL launched a site with experimental forecasts of lightning and hail for Europe based on post-processed weather model data.

== Organisation ==
The ESSL has two headquarters, one in Weßling close to Munich in Germany, and the other Wiener Neustadt in Austria. Both the German and the Austrian branch work together closely as formulated in a Memorandum of Understanding in 2012, the management boards are nearly identical.

Institutional members of the general assembly are national weather services such as the German DWD and the ZAMG, as well as meteorological research institutes like Research Center for Environmental Changes of the Academia Sinica in Taiwan or the German Aerospace Center’s Institute of Planetary Research DLR. Other members of the general assembly are scientists interested in severe weather research from all over the world.

== See also ==
- Skywarn Europe
- TORRO
- ESTOFEX
- NSSL
