= Hodonín =

- Town
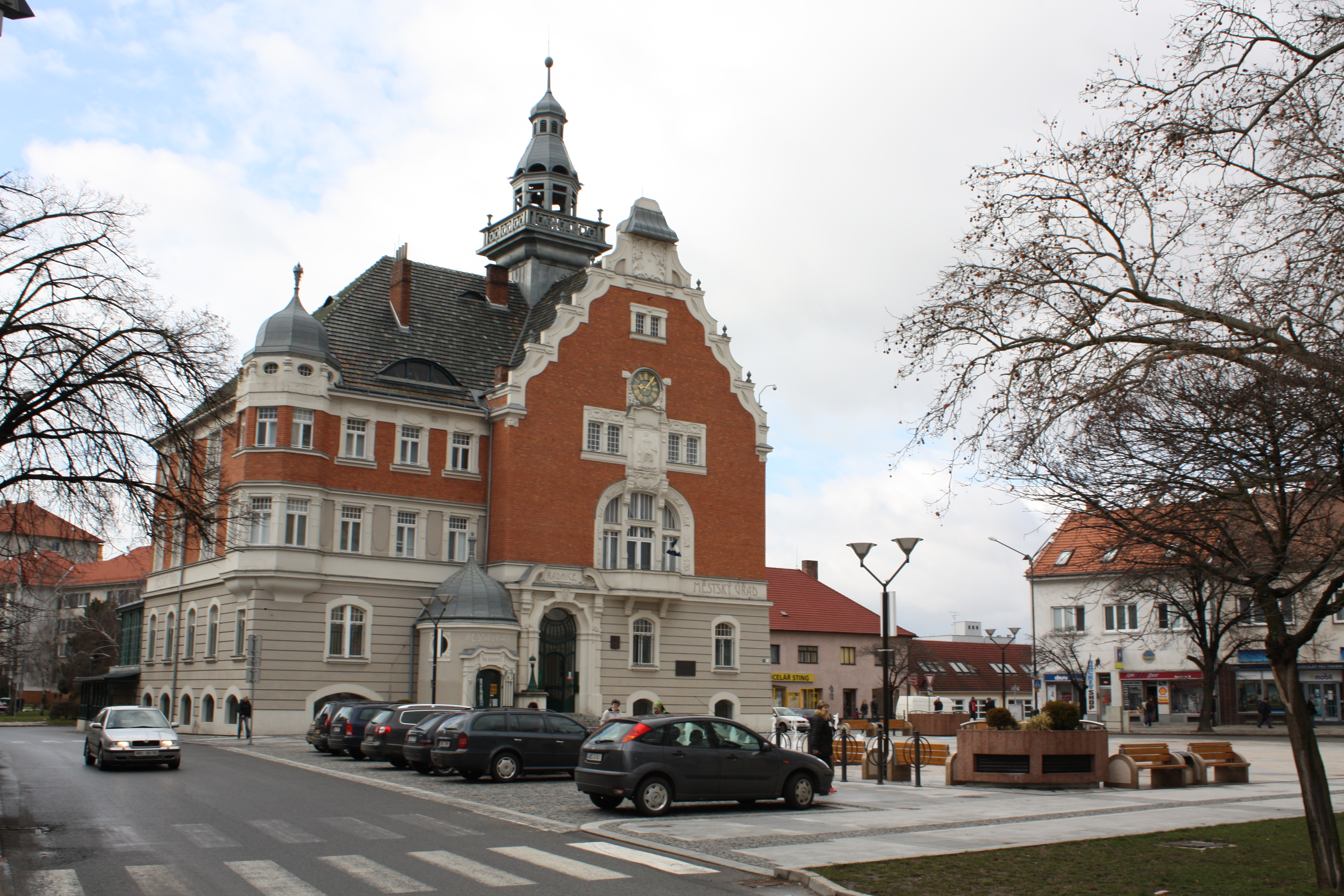
- Town hall

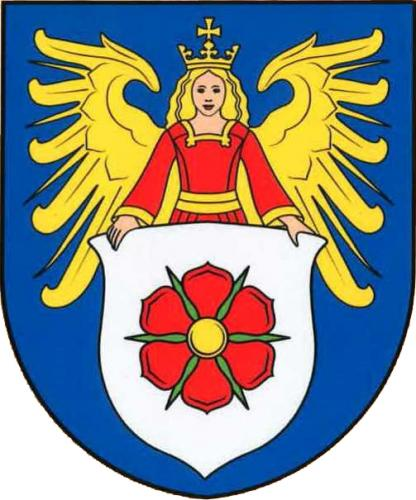
- Flag Coat of arms

- Location in the Czech Republic
- Coordinates: 48°50′56″N 17°7′57″E
- Country: Czech Republic
- Region: South Moravian
- District: Hodonín
- First mentioned: 1169

Government
  - Mayor: Libor Střecha

Area
  - Total: 63.31 km^{2} (24.44 sq mi)
- Elevation: 167 m (548 ft)

Population (2026-01-01)
  - Total: 23,344
  - Density: 368.7/km^{2} (955.0/sq mi)
- Time zone: UTC+1 (CET)
  - Summer (DST): UTC+2 (CEST)
- Postal code: 695 01
- Website: www.hodonin.eu

Hodonín (Czech pronunciation: [ˈɦodoɲiːn]; German: Göding) is a town in the South Moravian Region of the Czech Republic. It has about 23,000 inhabitants. The town is located on the Morava River in the Lower Morava Valley, on the border with Slovakia.

Hodonín was founded in the 11th century and became a town in 1228. However, it began to grow significantly only in the 19th century due to industrialisation. Among the main landmarks of Hodonín are the Church of Saint Lawrence and the Art Nouveau town hall. The town is known as the birthplace of Tomáš Garrigue Masaryk, the first president of Czechoslovakia.

== Etymology ==
The name is derived from the personal name Hodona. In Old Czech, the name was written as Godonín and the German name Göding was derived from it.

== Geography ==
Hodonín is located about 51 kilometres (32 mi) southeast of Brno, on the border with Slovakia. It lies in a flat landscape in the Lower Morava Valley. The town is situated on the right bank of the Morava River, which forms the Czech–Slovak border in this area. The western municipal boundary is formed by the Kyjovka River, which feeds here a system of eight fishponds.

== History ==
The castle in Hodonín was founded sometime in the 11th century. However, the document from 1046 which was the oldest mention of the castle, is demonstrably a forgery.

The first written credible mention of Hodonín is from 1169. In 1228, it became a town. During the Thirty Years' War the town was severely damaged and the population decreased. In the 18th century a local castle was rebuilt to a tobacco factory, whose production helped repopulate the town. The railway to Hodonín was built in 1841, and extended to Holíč in 1891.

Hodonín was the first town in the Protectorate of Bohemia and Moravia to be liberated from Nazi Germany occupation at the end of World War II. The battle for the town that was part of the Bratislava–Brno offensive, began on 11 April 1945, after the Red Army captured the nearby Holíč. Soviet troops crossed the Morava River and advanced toward Hodonín, supported by fighter planes that had already bombed German defenses and retreating units in the area. After approximately 24 hours of fighting, Soviet forces overcame the German resistance, and by 8 p.m. on 12 April, the town was fully liberated.

The northern part of the municipal territory (especially the locality of Pánov, a retirement home and the Hodonín Zoo) was severely damaged by the 2021 South Moravia tornado.

== Demographics ==
Historical population

Year	Pop.	±%
1869	5,202	—
1880	6,512	+25.2%
1890	8,482	+30.3%
1900	10,233	+20.6%
1910	12,197	+19.2%

Year	Pop.	±%
1921	13,200	+8.2%
1930	14,793	+12.1%
1950	13,572	−8.3%
1961	18,021	+32.8%
1970	20,863	+15.8%

Year	Pop.	±%
1980	25,485	+22.2%
1991	28,230	+10.8%
2001	27,361	−3.1%
2011	24,961	−8.8%
2021	24,100	−3.4%

Source: Censuses

== Economy ==
In the vicinity of the town is an oil field and a stratum of lignite. Lignite was mined here from the beginning of the 19th century until 2009.

The largest industrial employers based in the town are Delimax (manufacturer of delicatessen and fish products) and MND (oil and gas producer).

== Transport ==
The I/55 road (the section from Břeclav to Uherské Hradiště) passes through the town. There is a road border crossing and a railway border crossing, leading to neighbouring Holíč.

Hodonín is located on the intraregional railway lines Břeclav–Olomouc and Brno–Hodonín. There is also the line from Hodonín to Vrbovce in Slovakia.

== Sights ==
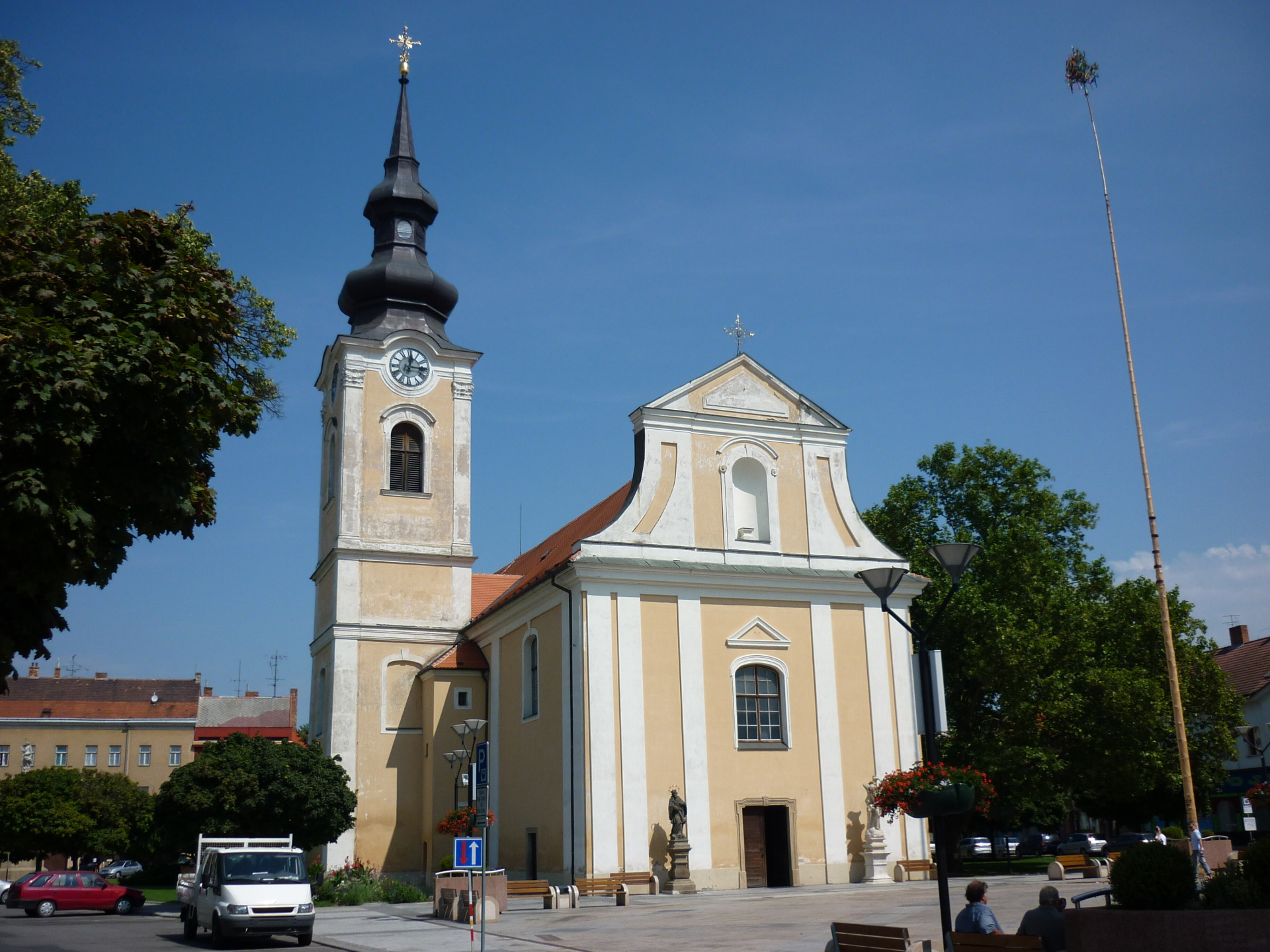
Church of Saint Lawrence

The main sights are the Church of Saint Lawrence and the town hall, both located on the town square. The church is originally a Gothic structure from the first half of the 13th century, rebuilt in the Baroque style in 1780–1786. The town hall was built in the Art Nouveau style in 1902–1904, by architect Ernst von Gotthilf in 1902–1904. Its tower is open to the public as a lookout tower.

The Hodonín Zoo was founded in 1977 and it is one of the smallest and youngest zoos in the country.

The history of local oil extraction, lignite mining and related technological processes are presented in the Museum of Oil Extraction and Geology.

== Notable people ==
- Tomáš Garrigue Masaryk (1850–1937), politician, the first president of Czechoslovakia
- Henry Kučera (1925–2010), linguist and pioneer of computer linguistics
- František Němec (1932–2025), cinematographer
- Václav Nedomanský (born 1944), ice hockey player
- Zdeněk Škromach (born 1956), politician
- Karel Komárek (born 1969), entrepreneur and philanthropist
- Dana Čechová (born 1983), table tennis player
- Vítězslav Veselý (born 1983), javelin thrower
- Michal Kempný (born 1990), ice hockey player
- Erik Daniel (born 1992), footballer

== Twin towns – sister cities ==
Hodonín is twinned with:

- Holíč, Slovakia
- Jasło, Poland
- Skalica, Slovakia
- Trebišov, Slovakia
- Vignola, Italy
- Zistersdorf, Austria
