= 2021 South Moravia tornado =

IF4 tornado in 2021

- The tornado as it was in Hodonín

Meteorological history
- Formed: 24 June 2021

IF4 tornado
- on the International Fujita scale
- Highest winds: 380 km/h (240 mph)

Overall effects
- Fatalities: 6
- Injuries: 576
- Damage: ~15 billion Kč
- Areas affected: South Moravian Region
- Part of the tornado outbreaks of 2021

In the evening hours of 24 June 2021, a rare, violent, and deadly long-tracked tornado struck several villages in the Hodonín and Břeclav districts of the South Moravian Region of the Czech Republic, killing six people and injuring 576 others. This tornado is the widest on record in Europe, at 3.5 kilometres (2.2 mi) maximum width. The tornado struck seven municipalities, with the worst damage in the villages of Hrušky, Moravská Nová Ves, Mikulčice and Lužice.

This tornado was the strongest ever documented in modern Czech history and the deadliest European tornado since 2001. It was rated as an F4 on the Fujita scale and an IF4 on the International Fujita scale. This made it the first confirmed violent (IF4+) tornado in Europe since June 2017, when an IF4 tornado struck the village of Maloye Pes'yanovo in Russia, until the 2026 Akçamezra tornado on 3 May 2026, it was the only IF4 rated tornado to occur since the scale was introduced.

== Tornado summary ==
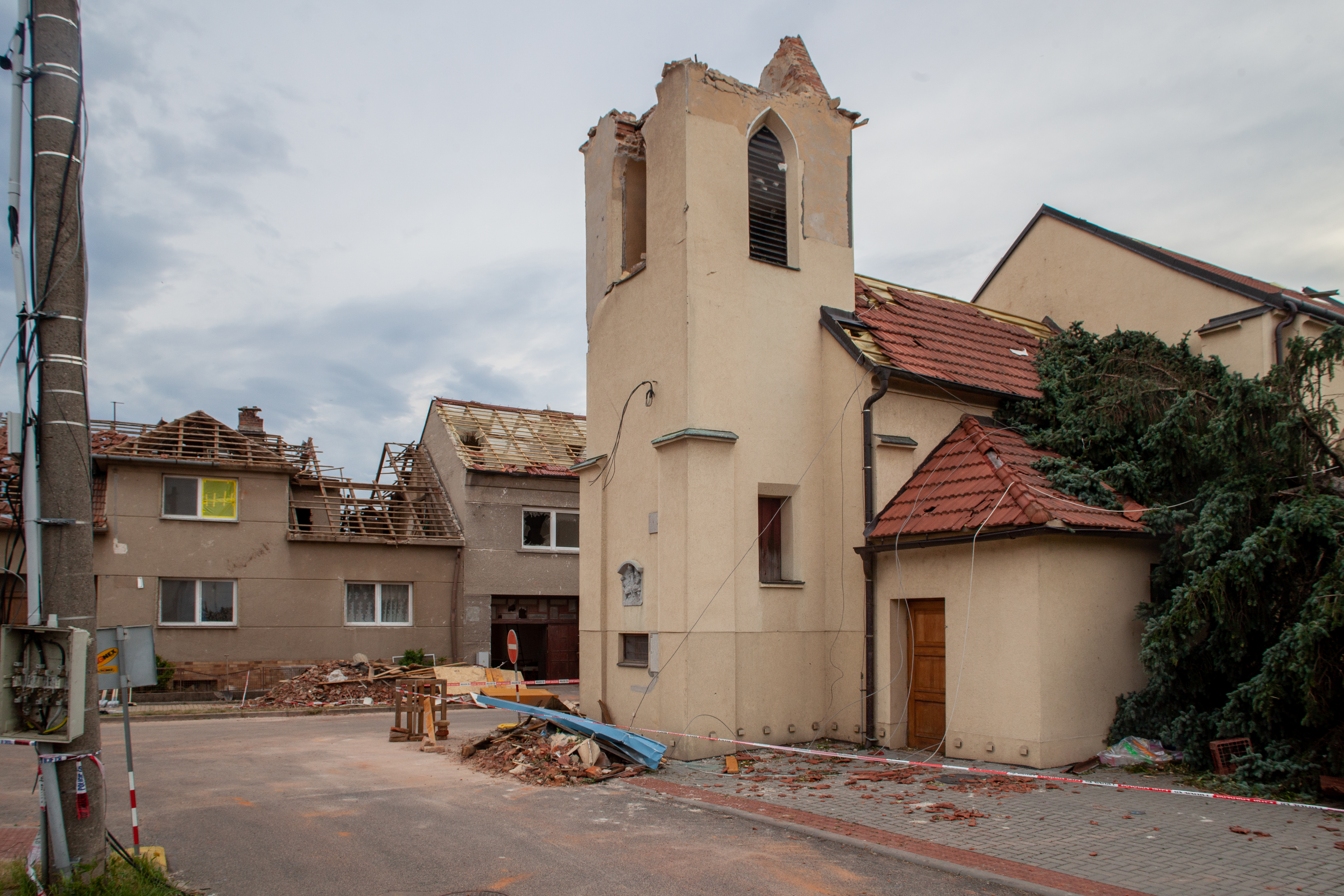
Damaged Church of Saint Bartholomew in Hrušky

The tornado first touched down just east of Břeclav, initially moving over open fields before continuing east and reaching F2 strength as some metal truss transmission towers were knocked over, and cars were blown off roadways into safety barriers. An area of F3-level tree damage occurred farther to the northeast, where a stand of large trees were denuded and mowed down. The tornado reached its peak width of 2.8 kilometers (1.7 mi) in this area. It then narrowed slightly and continued producing F3 damage to trees it moved to the east-northeast towards Hrušky. A small industrial complex was impacted in this area, and two brick buildings were significantly damaged, with the damage at that location being rated F2.

The large and intense tornado then struck Hrušky directly at F3 intensity, resulting in widespread, major structural damage throughout the southern half of the town. Numerous well-built brick homes had their roofs torn off, some of which sustained collapse of exterior walls, and a school building and a church were also severely damaged. Several cars were tossed against houses and into gardens, and a metal shipping container was thrown and wrapped around a large iron gate post. A 7-tonne caravan was lofted 20 meters (65 ft) over a garage, and two multi-tonne fair attractions were displaced several meters from where they originated. Groves of trees were snapped and debarked, outbuildings were leveled, and 201 houses were damaged in Hrušky, 58 of which were destroyed.

Shortly after exiting Hrušky, the tornado reached F4 intensity as it moved through a rural area, producing extreme damage to vegetation. Trees were completely stripped clean of bark and limbs in this area, and scoured grass and crops from nearby fields was left plastered against the trunks. Weakening back to F3 intensity, the tornado impacted a nearby cattle facility. Roofing was torn off, walls were collapsed, livestock was killed, and concrete roof and wall slabs were ripped from the large farm building and scattered into fields at this location. Nearby industrial and agricultural buildings were also severely damaged or destroyed, while trailers, tractors, and large concrete blocks from a hay storage structure were thrown as well.

Continuing at F3 strength, the large and powerful tornado struck Moravská Nová Ves, inflicting major structural damage to hundreds of well-built brick homes, apartment buildings, and businesses, dozens of which had roofs torn off and exterior walls collapsed. A pub and two boarding houses were destroyed in Moravská Nová Ves, and a large church had its roof torn off. The church's clock tower was also damaged, and the clock itself was stopped at 7:25 pm, the time the tornado struck the town. Multiple vehicles were flipped, large trees were snapped and denuded, and streets in town were blocked by structural debris and downed power lines following the tornado. A total of 369 buildings were damaged in Moravská Nová Ves, 31 of which were destroyed.

The tornado narrowed further but reached peak strength as it ripped directly through the neighboring town of Mikulčice, leaving widespread destruction and several areas of violent F4 damage. Multiple well-built brick and masonry homes had F4-level structural damage, some of which sustained collapse of thick load-bearing walls, and a few were partially to completely leveled. At one location at the west edge of town, three adjacent masonry homes were completely destroyed at F4 intensity, one of which was flattened with no walls left standing. Several inches of topsoil was scoured from a nearby farm field, and debris from destroyed structures was strewn long distances. Numerous homes and several businesses were heavily damaged or destroyed in the central part of town, including a brick house that was leveled to the ground and had two cars tossed on top of the remaining pile of rubble. Some other homes in this area were left with only a few walls standing, and gravestones were cracked and broken at a cemetery. The exterior walls of structures that remained standing were scarred and impaled by pieces of debris, and streets were left strewn with bricks and lumber.

Some of the most violent damage occurred in the eastern part of town, where multiple very well-built masonry homes were largely destroyed, and trees sustained severe debarking, some of which were completely stripped clean of all bark. An occupied passenger bus in this area was thrown over a small hill into a brick home that was destroyed, severely injuring multiple passengers. Major damage also occurred along the railroad tracks, where multiple overhead lines and pylons were toppled, several industrial buildings were destroyed, and heavy concrete slabs were displaced and moved several meters. Railroad signals were also destroyed, and sound canceling barriers were torn apart with their debris scattered across a wide area. Multiple vehicles were thrown and mangled in the Mikulčice area, and one car was lofted 200 meters (656 ft) through the air into an open field at a vineyard, where it was found with its engine block torn out and missing. The engine block was later found 150 meters (492 ft) away from where the car was located, thrown in the opposite direction of the movement of the tornado. Iron wiring used to secure grape vines at the vineyard was found twisted around trees, and several brick wine storage buildings were damaged or collapsed. A total of 300 homes were damaged in Mikulčice, 62 of which were destroyed.

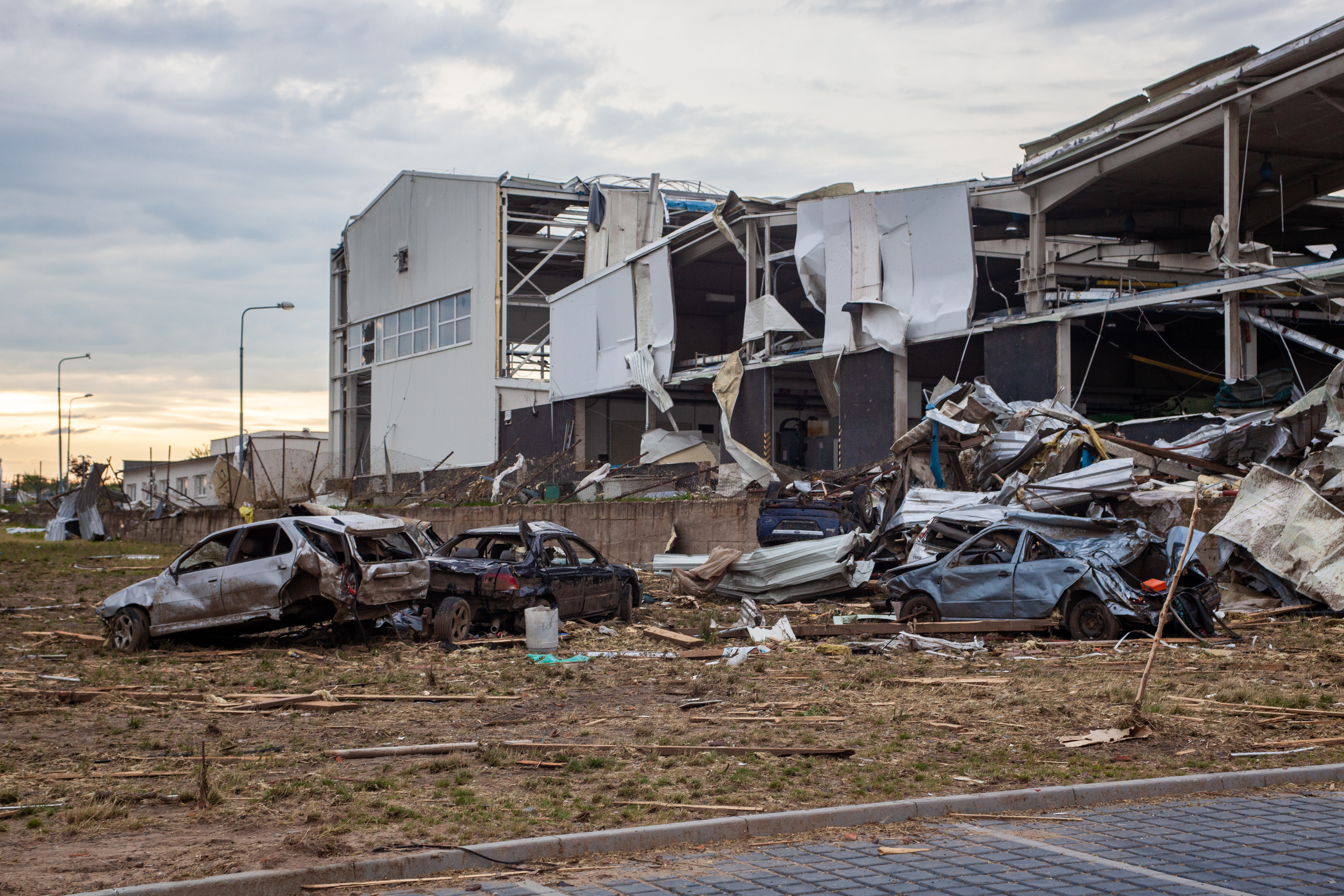
Major damage to cars and an industrial building in Lužice

Continuing into Lužice, the tornado became narrower but continued to produce a path of very intense damage. A majority of the damage in Lužice was rated F3, though a small area of F4 damage was noted in the southern part of town, where two very well-built brick homes sustained major structural damage, including collapse of multiple thick masonry walls. Multiple other homes and apartment buildings were damaged or destroyed, trees were debarked, large industrial buildings and factories sustained major structural damage, streets were left covered with debris, and severed gas and electrical lines sparked multiple small fires in the wake of the tornado. Numerous cars were thrown and piled against one metal-framed industrial building that was heavily damaged in town, and a smaller masonry structure was completely destroyed, though it was not well-constructed enough to warrant a rating higher than F3.

The tornado continued through the northeastern part of Lužice at F3 strength, where several vineyards and gardens sustained extensive damage, and some smaller wooden and brick structures were destroyed. Trees were snapped and denuded, and multiple houses were destroyed near Lake Lužák. A total of 100 homes were damaged in Lužice, 17 of which were destroyed. After exiting Lužice, the tornado remained narrow and weakened to F2 strength, but still proceeded to cut a path of extensive damage through the northern part of neighboring Hodonín. Multiple large apartment buildings, office buildings, businesses, and houses sustained significant damage. Several other buildings, including a retirement home, a sports complex, an arena, and structures at the Hodonín Zoo were also severely damaged. A few metal buildings were destroyed, along with numerous solar panels at a solar energy facility. Cars were flipped in parking lots, debris from impacted structures was found speared into the ground, and many small sheds and cottages were obliterated at a large allotment garden. Many trees and power lines were downed, and hundreds of structures were damaged in Hodonín, some of which were destroyed.

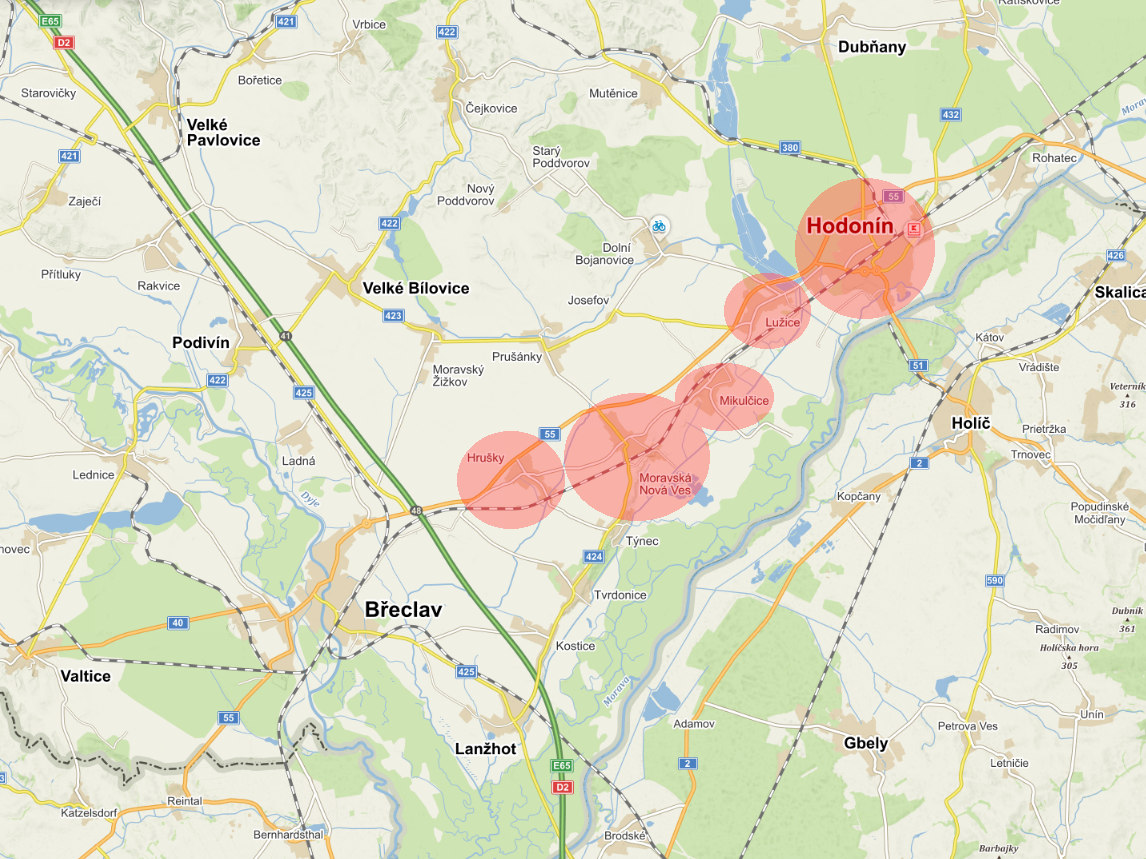
A map of areas affected by the tornado

The strong tornado widened again and curved northward as it exited Hodonín and moved into a rural area, completely mowing down a large swath of trees as it impacted a patch of forest. Metal truss transmission towers were blown over in this area, crops were damaged in farm fields, and damage along this segment of the path was rated F2.

The tornado briefly strengthened again one final time as it struck the village of Pánov at high-end F3 strength. Almost every structure in the small village was damaged in some way, and multiple homes were significantly damaged or destroyed, a few of which were leveled. Outbuildings were destroyed, cars were damaged by flying debris, and large trees were snapped and denuded as well. The tornado continued past Pánov and moved through another densely forested area, weakening back to F2 strength as it flattened another large swath of trees. The tornado continued to weaken, and trees beyond this point were downed at F1 intensity as the tornado continued to the northeast before it abruptly dissipated near Ratíškovice. In all, at least 1,200 buildings were damaged or destroyed by the tornado along its 27.1 kilometer (17 mi)-long path. 6 people were killed by the tornado, and at least 200 more were injured, some critically.

== Aftermath ==
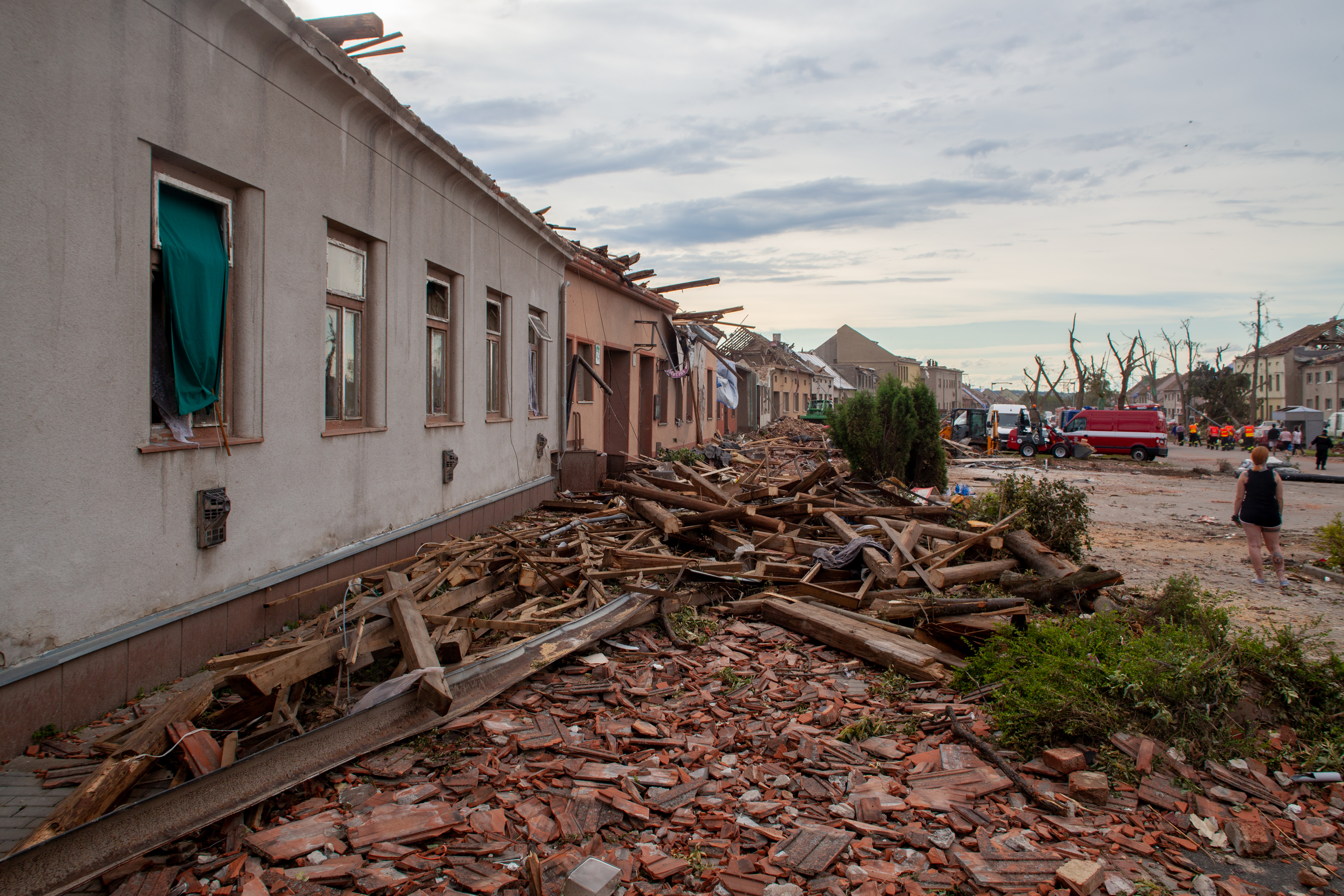
Damaged houses on the Republic Square in Moravská Nová Ves

The tornado caused widespread power outages, with approximately 121,000 households left without electricity in the region. 1202 buildings were damaged or destroyed. 180 buildings that did not completely collapse were scheduled for demolition. The D2 motorway linking Brno with Bratislava in Slovakia was closed. Rescue teams from across the country (including Prague) and also from neighboring Austria and Slovakia were deployed, as was the Czech Army. Overall, the damage was estimated at 15 billion Kč (€589 million or US$703 million), including a damage of about 800 million Kč (US$37.5 million) in the South Moravian Region.

Shortly after the tornado, workers started to fix homes that were not damaged beyond repair. Streets of impacted villages were filled with piles of debris and destroyed vehicles. The governor of South Moravia, Jan Grolich, stressed the need to clean them, and artificial landfills were made for cleaned up debris. Some of it will be used to aid house repairs.

A delegation of the Vietnamese Embassy and the Vietnamese Association in the Czech Republic visited several Vietnamese households to help support and comfort them. A fundraising campaign was launched by the delegation to aid those affected. More than 200,000 Kč (~US$9,300) was raised in a day for essential goods. Over 30 Vietnamese families were affected, according to the association.

Hodonín-born entrepreneur and philanthropist Karel Komárek pledged an immediate donation of 150 million Kč (US$7.03 million) to help the recovery effort. "I was born in Hodonín and this disaster has deeply affected me. We have to act quickly, which is why we immediately set aside funds to help with the recovery effort and to give people back their livelihoods," said Komárek after he announced his donation. He also said he would make more funds available, should the situation require it.

Ice hockey player Michal Kempný, a native of Hodonín, helped to rebuild his hometown after the tornado. The National Czech & Slovak Museum & Library in the U.S. requested direct financial assistance to help impacted areas. The CEO, Dr. Cecilia Rokusek called the tornado the "most devastating storm ever in the country", and that assistance is "essential for preserving our rich history for the long term future".

== Other tornadoes ==
This tornado was part of a small outbreak that affected Europe that day, which produced a total of seven tornadoes. In Poland, one person was injured by an F2 tornado that impacted the towns of Librantowa and Koniuszowa, damaging numerous structures, 15 of which had their roofs torn off. Numerous reports of damaging straight-line winds and large, destructive hail were received as well.

List of reported tornadoes - Thursday, June 24, 2021
F#	Location	Region	Coord.	Time (UTC)	Path length	Damage
Poland
F1	SE of Boronów	Silesian Voivodeship	50.67°N 18.93°E	8:10	unknown	Several trees had their branches snapped, and a telephone line fell on a car.
F2	Koniuszowa to Librantowa	Lesser Poland Voivodeship	49.66°N 20.75°E	14:18	unknown	Dozens of homes and buildings were damaged, including 15 that lost their roofs. Outbuildings were destroyed, trees were downed, and sheet metal was thrown into fences and power lines. One person was injured.
F1	Wrzelów	Lublin Voivodeship	51.22°N 21.85°E	23:30	unknown	20 homes sustained roof damage from this tornado.
Czech Republic
IF4	E of Břeclav to Mikulčice to NE of Hodonín	South Moravian Region	50.12°N 17.07°E	17:40	27.1 km (16.8 mi)	6 deaths – See above section on this tornado – 576 people were injured.
France
F?	SSE of Miribel-les-Échelles	Auvergne-Rhône-Alpes	45.42°N 5.70°E	15:00	unknown	A tornado briefly touched down, causing no damage.
Russia
F?	Lake Peipus	Pskov Oblast	unknown	unknown	unknown	A tornadic waterspout formed over Lake Peipus, causing no damage.
Germany
F?	S of Kinzenbach	Hesse	unknown	17:45	unknown	A tornado was sighted and photographed at the south edge of Kinzenbach, causing no damage.

== See also ==
- Weather of 2021
- List of tornadoes rated on the International Fujita scale
- List of European tornadoes and tornado outbreaks
- List of F4 and EF4 tornadoes
  - List of F4 and EF4 tornadoes (2020–present)
- October 2022 European tornado outbreak – An EF3 tornado struck Bihucourt
