= Avsallar =

- Neighbourhood
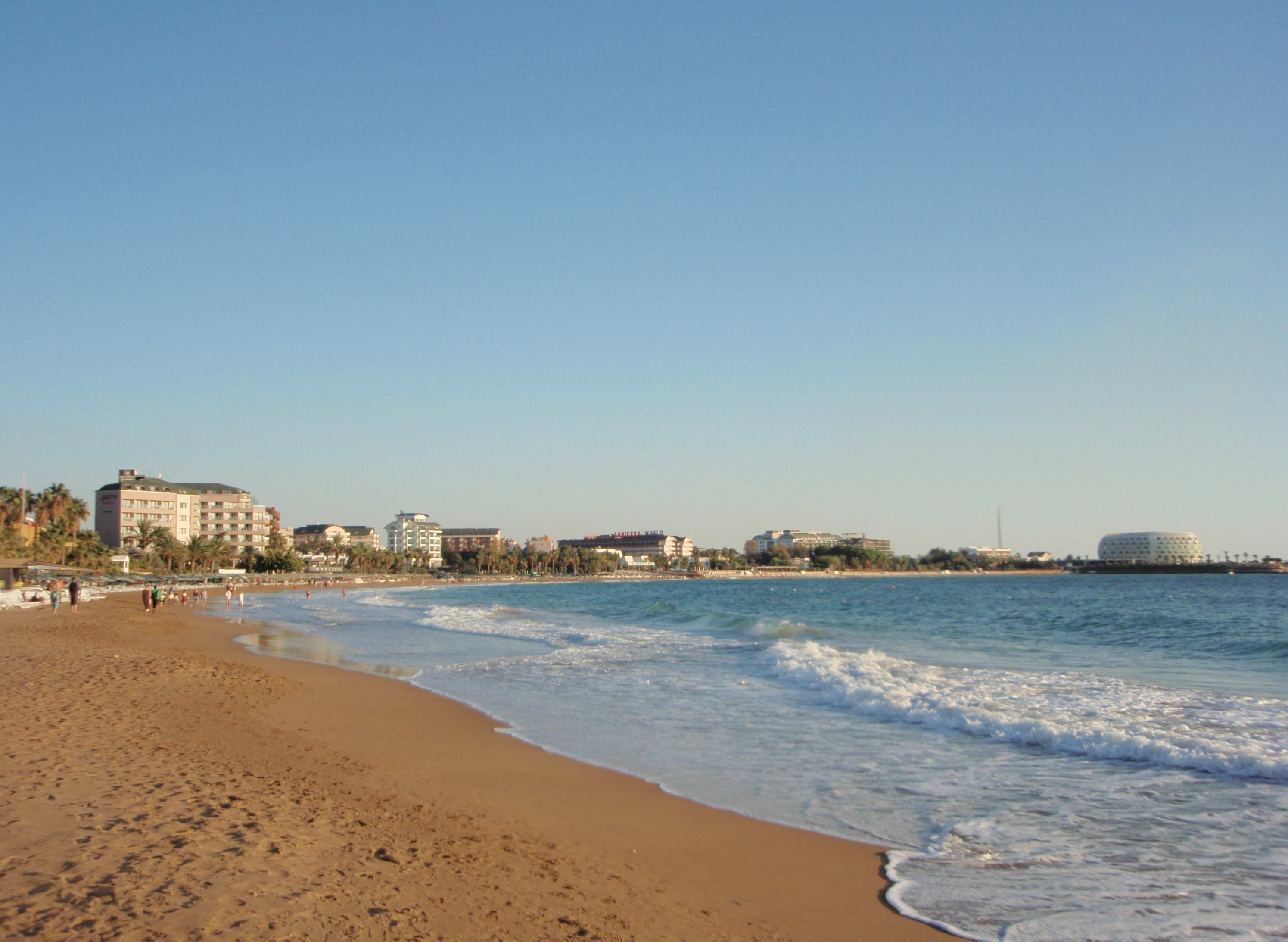
- Avsallar

- Location within Turkey
- Coordinates: 36°37′20″N 31°46′0″E
- Country: Turkey
- Province: Antalya
- District: Alanya
- Elevation: 20 m (66 ft)
- Population (2022): 15,220
- Time zone: UTC+3 (TRT)
- Postal code: 07410
- Area code: 0242

Avsallar is a neighbourhood in the municipality and district of Alanya, Antalya Province, Turkey. Its population is 15,220 (2022). Before the 2013 reorganisation, it was a town (belde).

== Geography ==
It is a coastal town on Turkish state highway D.400 which runs from west to east in southern Turkey. The distance to Alanya is 24 kilometres (15 mi) and to Antalya is 110 kilometres (68 mi).

== History ==
It's believed that Avsallar was founded by a group of Oghuz Turks belonging to the Avshar tribe from Kençek Señir (a historical settlement in Talas Province of Kyrgyzstan) in the 15th century. The name Avsallar is thought to be a corrupted form of Avsharlar (-lar is a Turkic plural suffix). The earlier settlement was to the north of the present Avsallar. In 1843 following a fire, the people moved to present location. In 1986 Avsallar was declared a seat of township.

== Economy ==
The economy of the town depends on tourism and citrus farming. But because of new hotel constructions the proportion of land allocated to farming is shrinking.

== International relations ==
Avsallar is twinned with:

- Nowy Sącz, Poland
