= Sviny (Tábor District) =

- Municipality
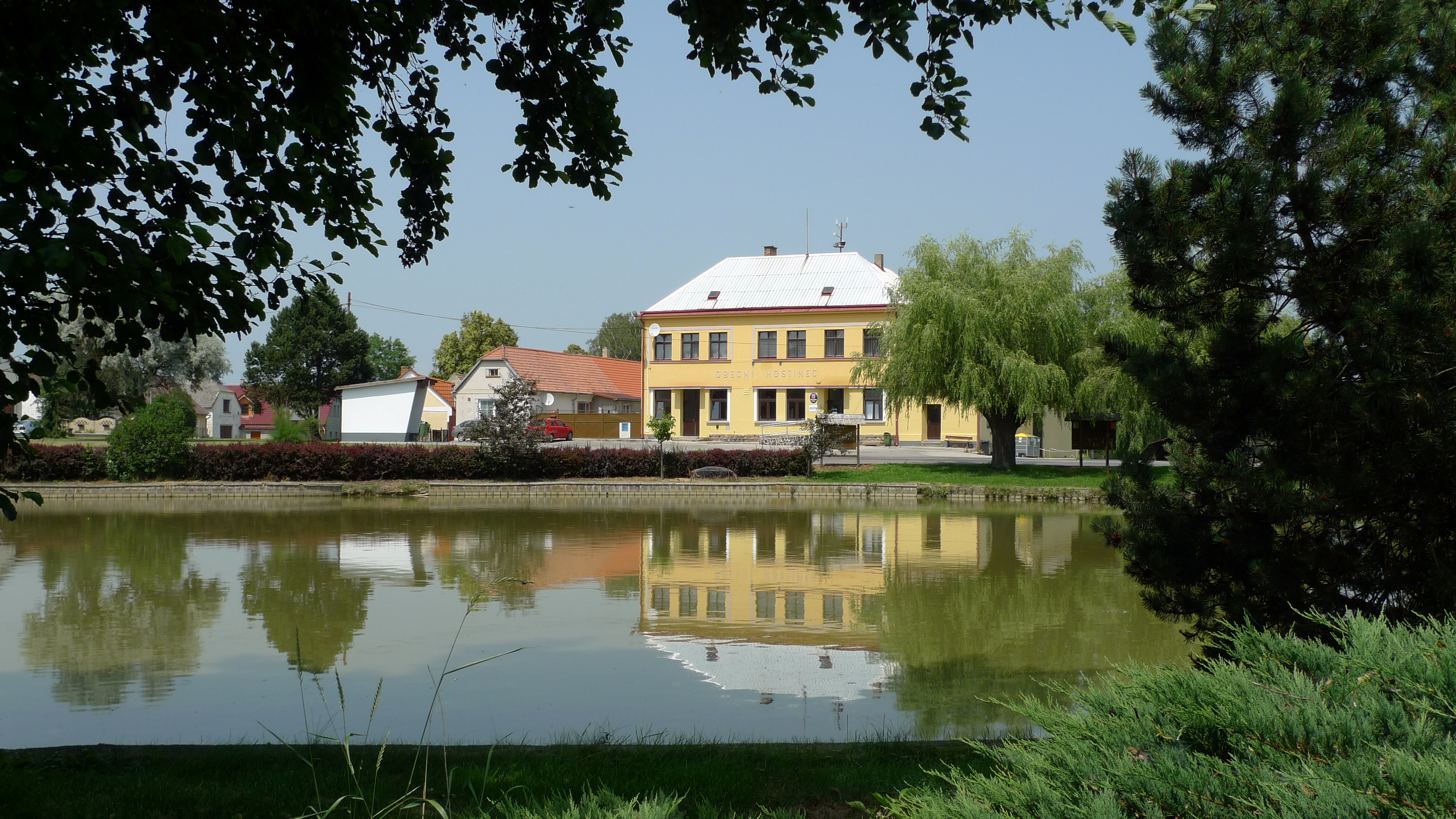
- A pond in the centre of Sviny

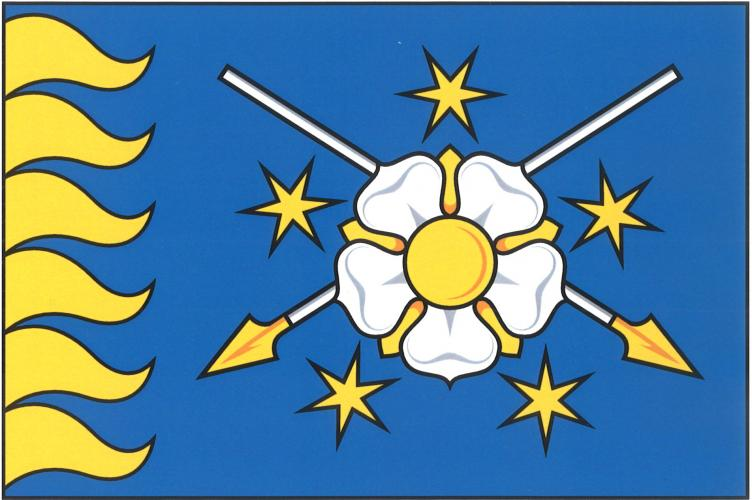
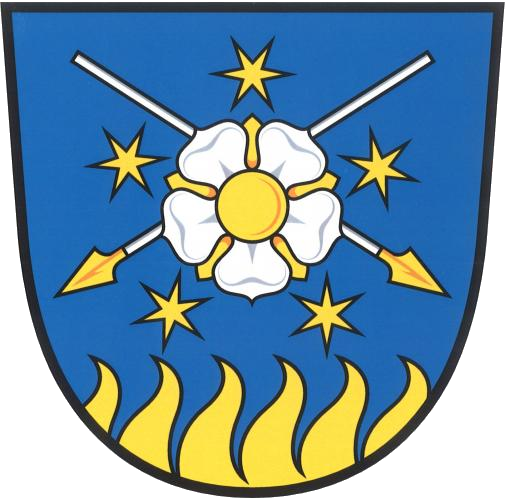
- Flag Coat of arms

- Location in the Czech Republic
- Coordinates: 49°11′14″N 14°38′9″E
- Country: Czech Republic
- Region: South Bohemian
- District: Tábor
- First mentioned: 1379

Area
  - Total: 11.24 km^{2} (4.34 sq mi)
- Elevation: 419 m (1,375 ft)

Population (2026-01-01)
  - Total: 335
  - Density: 29.8/km^{2} (77.2/sq mi)
- Time zone: UTC+1 (CET)
  - Summer (DST): UTC+2 (CEST)
- Postal code: 391 81
- Website: www.obec-sviny.cz

Sviny is a municipality and village in Tábor District in the South Bohemian Region of the Czech Republic. It has about 300 inhabitants.

Sviny lies approximately 26 kilometres (16 mi) south of Tábor, 27 km (17 mi) north-east of České Budějovice, and 102 km (63 mi) south of Prague.

== Administrative division ==
Sviny consists of two municipal parts (in brackets population according to the 2021 census):

- Sviny (296)
- Kundratice (32)

== Demographics ==
Historical population
Year	Pop.	±%
1869	527	—
1880	543	+3.0%
1890	524	−3.5%
1900	488	−6.9%
1910	530	+8.6%
1921	572	+7.9%
1930	526	−8.0%
1950	416	−20.9%
1961	366	−12.0%
1970	332	−9.3%
1980	313	−5.7%
1991	315	+0.6%
2001	313	−0.6%
2011	332	+6.1%
2021	328	−1.2%
Source: Censuses
