= List of European tornadoes in 2025 =

List of tornadoes in Europe and surrounding regions in 2025

European tornadoes of 2025
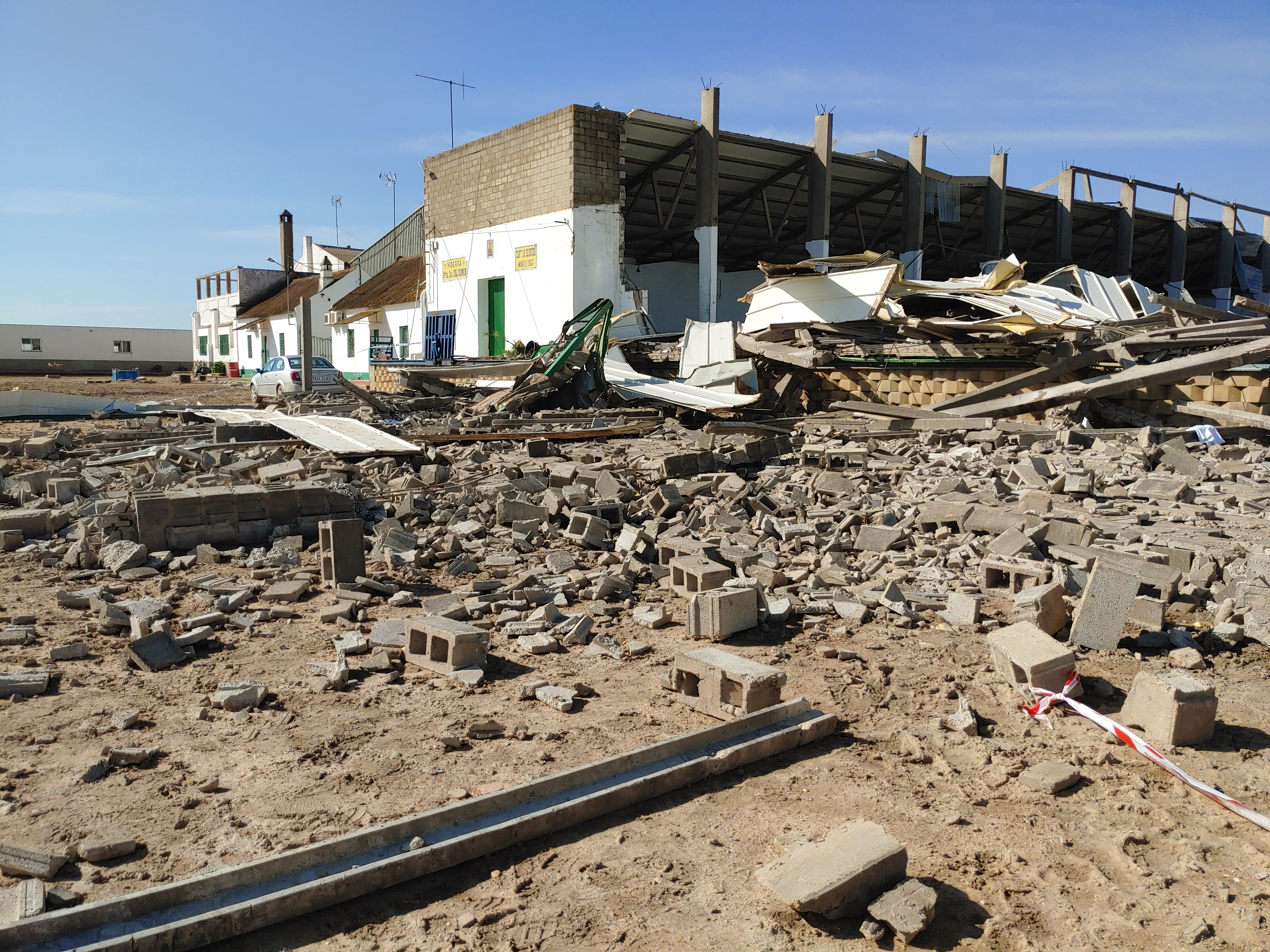
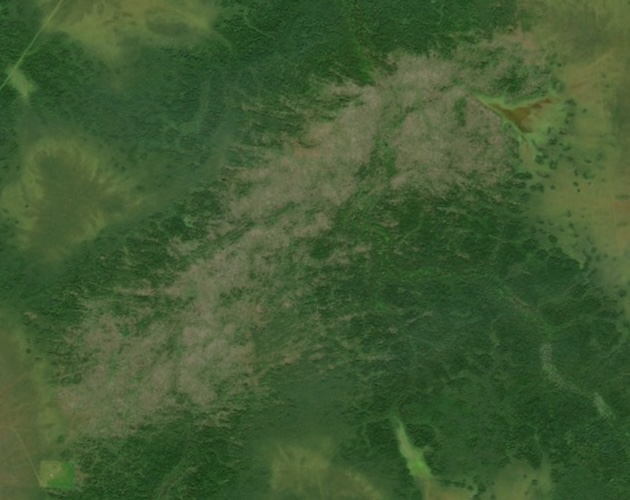
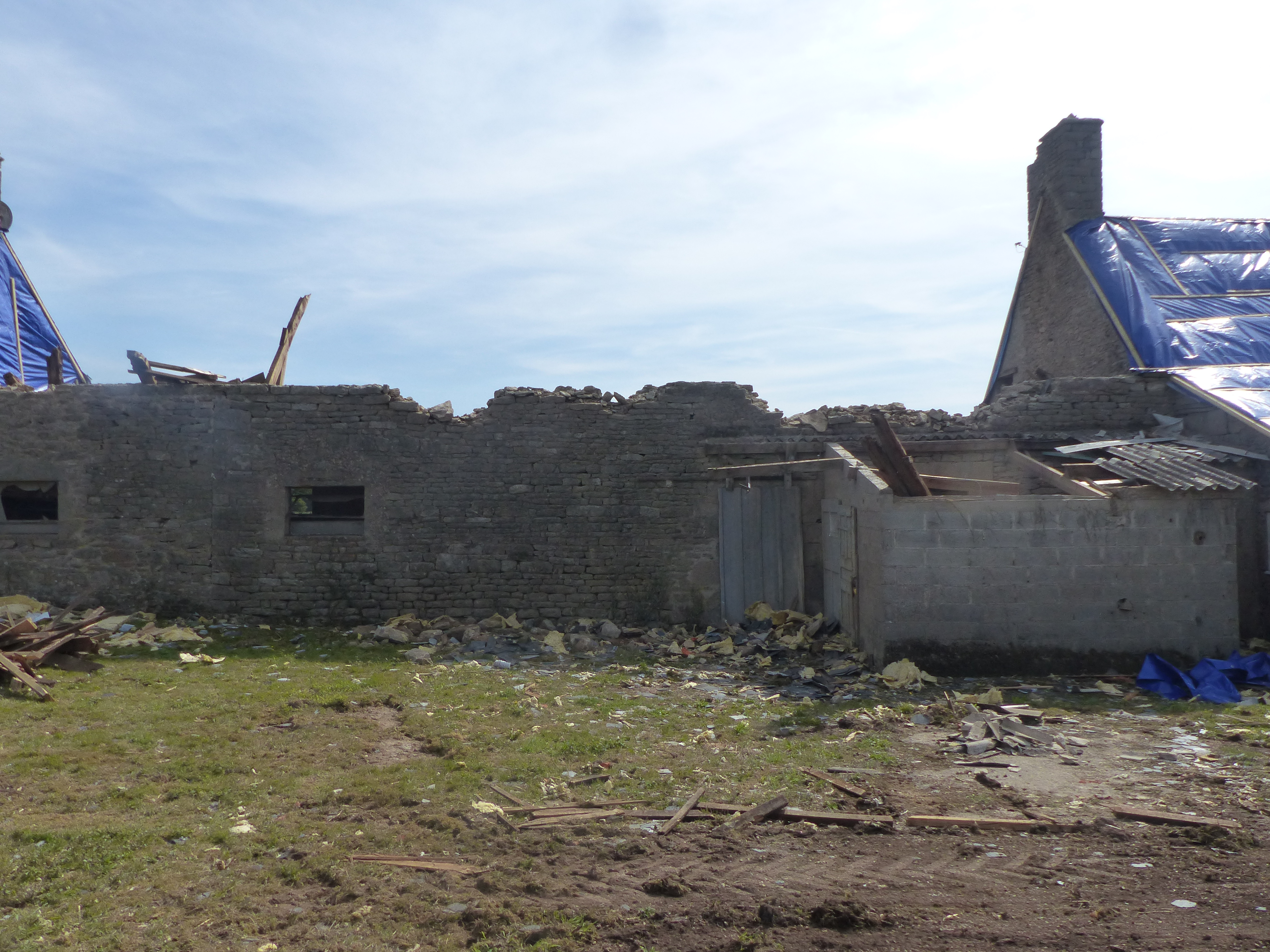
- Clockwise from top: A destroyed warehouse near Coria del Río, Spain, where an IF2 tornado killed three workers on April 4; IF2 tornado damage near Guéhenno, France on October 20; The scar of an F3/IF2 tornado that tore through Khanty-Mansia, Russia on June 17
- Timespan: 5 January 2025 – 31 December 2025
- Maximum rated tornado: IF2 tornado: 25 tornadoes on 25 different days
- Tornadoes: 319
- Fatalities: 7 (52 injuries)

The 2025 European tornado season consisted of tornadoes and tornado outbreaks across Europe.

IFU	IF0	IF0.5	IF1	IF1.5	IF2	IF2.5	IF3	IF4	IF5	Total
107	19	52	67	49	25	0	0	0	0	319

- Note: Some tornadoes have been rated using different scales. They are counted as their closest IF-Scale equivalent on this table.
- Note: 8 tornadoes have been confirmed but have not been rated yet.

Many different meteorological organizations across Europe document tornado events, often using different tornado intensity scales, including the TORRO (T) scale, the Fujita (F) scale, the Enhanced Fujita (EF) scale, and the International Fujita (IF) scale. For consistency, this list primarily uses the IF-scale, the preferred scale of the European Severe Storms Laboratory (ESSL) and its database, the European Severe Weather Database (ESWD).

== Climatology ==
Despite their similar areas, Europe sees significantly fewer tornadoes than the United States. Geography plays a major role in this discrepancy, with the unique features in North America making areas like Tornado Alley ideal for severe weather, while many of these conditions are generally less optimal in Europe. However, the under-reporting of weaker tornadoes across the continent also contributes to this. This under-reporting primarily stems from a lack of pan-European collaboration in monitoring tornadoes, resulting in less public and institutional awareness of them or their danger or the real threat they pose, despite many occurrences of violent, damaging, and deadly tornadoes across the continent.

Tornado activity in Europe typically peaks in the summer months and is lowest during the winter months. More specifically, Central and Northern Europe peak in the summer, the western and central Mediterranean regions peak in autumn, and the eastern Mediterranean region peaks in the winter. Tornadoes over land most often occur in the late afternoon and early evening hours. On the other hand, waterspouts, which sometimes move ashore in coastal areas and become tornadoes, peak in late spring and typically occur earlier in the day.

== Season summary ==
- Note: Unrated tornadoes are counted as IFU on the graphs

The month of January was unusually active in 2025, seeing five IF2 tornadoes in the month, including one in the United Kingdom that injured one person. These were all associated with European windstorms, which peak in intensity in the winter months, creating favourable conditions for severe weather such as tornadoes. February was less active, although one IF2 tornado touched down in Spain. Two more windstorms struck the Iberian coast in March, spawning several tornadoes in Spain.

Early April was very active, with storms in Turkey and Greece spawning seven tornadoes from 1–2 April, including an IF2 tornado in Turkey and an IF1 tornado that went through Rhodes. Just two days later, another windstorm spawned three tornadoes in southern Spain, including one that injured four workers and an IF2 tornado that killed three. Activity remained relatively low for the remainder of the month, although one strong tornado touched down in Hungary.

May also began with a tornado outbreak, this time across Western and Eastern Europe. In all, 11 tornadoes touched down across five countries from 2–4 May, including one in Portugal that resulted in one injury. On 22 May, five tornadoes touched down across the Po Valley in Italy. Another small outbreak occurred across Central Europe late in the month.

June favored more isolated tornado events, including one IF2 tornado in France and Germany each early in the month. Some touched down in unlikely places, namely the IF2 tornado that touched down in Norway and the IF1.5 tornado that injured five in Armenia. However, there were some smaller tornado outbreaks, including ones in Russia, Estonia and Sweden near the end of the month.

July started strong with an IF2 in Finland that damaged unpopulated forests. Not long later there was a small outbreak of 6 tornadoes that had 2 significant IF2s in Italy and Slovakia. The next three days were strong with an IF1.5 in Italy on 8th, an IF2 in Belarus on the 9th and another IF1.5 in Russia on the 10th. It would take a bit for stronger activity but on the 15th there was a strong IF2 in Austria causing significant damage. The rest of the month was mainly weak with IFU and IF0.5 tornadoes but on the 29th there was another IF2 in Belarus. This month tied for the highest tornado count of the year with June.

August also started strong with an IF2 in Russia and an IF1.5 in Italy on the 3rd. The next couple days only consisted of IFUs until the 10th where there were 2 IF1.5s in Poland. August from here until the 23rd only consisted of weak isolated events, on the 23rd there was a strong IF1.5 in Russia causing significant damage to trees. On one of the last days of the month there was a tornado outbreak of 12 tornadoes across different countries, the strongest of these were 3 IF1.5 tornadoes, 2 in France and 1 in Poland.

September had an extremely strong start with an IF1.5 in Italy on the 1st and a large and long-tracked IF2 in France that caused significant damage and injured 4 people on the 2nd. The month had weak tornadoes until the 11th with an IF1.5 in Turkey that partially destroyed roofs in Tezeren village. It wouldn't take long to see another strong tornado as there was a rare IF1.5 tornado in Sweden on the 14th. The rest of the month only consisted of weak tornadoes but there was a small outbreak in Italy on the 22nd that consisted of 9 weak tornadoes, this outbreak was caused by Storm Alessio in the 2025-26 European windstorm season.

October started with a significant IF2 rated landspout in Norway on the 4th. The next couple days would produce 3 IF1.5 tornadoes on 3 different days in Turkey, Sweden, and Syria. The 20th would produce a small outbreak of 8 mostly weak tornadoes, the strongest of which being a long-tracked IF2 that struck several suburbs northwest of Paris, France; this tornado killed 1 person and caused 9 injuries. The 28th saw 4 strong tornadoes, the strongest of which being 2 IF2s in Turkey, the second tornado killing someone. The month ended with an IF2 in Spain that also killed 1 person.

November consisted of mostly weak and isolated events until a small outbreak on the 15th consisting of 2 IF2s in Portugal one of which being deadly, and a city in Italy being hit by 6 tornadoes, the strongest of which being an IF1.5. The rest of November consisted of weak tornadoes until the 27th where an IF1.5 produced in Greece.

December was filled with mainly weak and isolated events but there were 2 IF1.5s in Greece and Cyprus on the 5th. The month ended with 3 weak IF-0.5s all happening on different days in Spain on the 28th, Turkey on the 29th, and Syria on the 31st. Overall 2025 was an average year on tornado count.

== January ==
IFU	IF0	IF0.5	IF1	IF1.5	IF2	IF2.5	IF3	IF4	IF5	Total
2	1	3	3	2	5	0	0	0	0	16

=== 5 January event ===
List of confirmed tornadoes – Sunday, 5 January 2025 (Note: All dates are based on the local time zone where the tornado touched down; however, all times are in Coordinated Universal Time for consistency.)
IF#	Location	Region	Country	Start coord.	Time (UTC)	Path length	Max. width
IF0.5	Peniche	Leiria	Portugal	39.35°N 9.38°W	15:00	Unknown	Unknown
IF0.5	A waterspout made landfall in the Luís de Camões neighbourhood of Peniche, where 21 homes suffered minimal damage. Some trees and signs were downed as well. The IPMA rated it F0/T1 while the ESSL rated it IF0.5.						

=== 7 January event ===
List of confirmed tornadoes – Tuesday, 7 January 2025
IF#	Location	Region	Country	Start coord.	Time (UTC)	Path length	Max. width
IF0.5	Sarıcaali	Edirne	Turkey	40.98°N 26.37°E	03:45	Unknown	Unknown
IF0.5	Minor damage to roofs, trees, and power lines occurred.						

=== 17 January event ===
List of confirmed tornadoes – Friday, 17 January 2025
IF#	Location	Region	Country	Start coord.	Time (UTC)	Path length	Max. width
IF1	Licata	Sicily	Italy	37.11°N 13.87°E	14:21	1.3 km (0.81 mi)	50 m (55 yd)
IF1	A waterspout moved onshore and impacted the outskirts of Licata, damaging crops and destroying greenhouses.						
IF2	S of Avola to W of Canicattini Bagni	Sicily	Italy	36.89°N 15.11°E	14:23	20.3 km (12.6 mi)	100 m (110 yd)
IF2	This long-tracked, multiple-vortex tornado began as a tornadic waterspout, which moved onshore and impacted areas to the southwest of Avola before it dissipated near Canicattini Bagni. A house was unroofed, other homes sustained heavy roof damage, and a masonry outbuilding was destroyed. A metal truss electrical transmission tower was toppled to the ground, and many trees and power lines were downed as well.						
IF0.5	Augusta	Sicily	Italy	37.25°N 15.22°E	15:25	1.4 km (0.87 mi)	65 m (71 yd)
IF0.5	A waterspout moved onshore and struck Augusta, where some buildings had sheet metal roofing torn off, trees and power lines were downed, and an ape car was flipped over. Decorations and concrete monuments were damaged at a cemetery.						
IF2	S of Catania	Sicily	Italy	37.41°N 15.00°E	15:45	14.4 km (8.9 mi)	190 m (210 yd)
IF2	This strong tornado tracked from Vaccarizzo-Delfino to Primosole, near Catania. Buildings suffered major roof damage, and metal roofing was scattered 500 m (550 yd) up a hillside at one location. A metal truss electrical transmission tower was bent in half, metal light poles were bent, and a roulotte trailer was rolled 30 m (33 yd). Significant tree damage occurred along the path, and a semi-trailer was overturned.						
IF1.5	Aci Catena	Sicily	Italy	37.59°N 15.14°E	17:20	2.5 km (1.6 mi)	170 m (190 yd)
IF1.5	A tornado rolled a camper, damaged the roofs of buildings, ripped doors off of building, and trees were downed in convergent patterns.						

=== 21 January event ===
List of confirmed tornadoes – Tuesday, 21 January 2025
IF#	Location	Region	Country	Start coord.	Time (UTC)	Path length	Max. width
IF2	W of Alcácer do Sal	Setúbal	Portugal	38.37°N 8.60°W	23:05	Unknown	Unknown
IF2	Storm Garoe spawned a significant nocturnal tornado that moved through rural areas near Montevil. It caused severe tree damage as many large trees were snapped or uprooted along the path, some being stripped of their branches. Some power lines were also downed, and crop damage occurred.						

=== 23 January event ===
List of confirmed tornadoes – Thursday, 23 January 2025
IF#	Location	Region	Country	Start coord.	Time (UTC)	Path length	Max. width
IF2	Holywell to Quintrell Downs	Cornwall	United Kingdom	50.38°N 5.13°W	09:36	Unknown	Unknown
IF2	This strong tornado moved through Holywell and Quintrell Downs, snapping many trees and damaging the roofs of homes. The most significant damage occurred at the Trevornick Caravan Park, where multiple mobile homes and caravans were tossed around and destroyed, resulting in one injury.						

=== 27 January event ===
List of confirmed tornadoes – Monday, 27 January 2025
IF#	Location	Region	Country	Start coord.	Time (UTC)	Path length	Max. width
IF1	SE of Whitchurch Hill	Oxfordshire	United Kingdom	51.4963°N 1.0609°W	08:15	2.6 km (1.6 mi)	80 m (87 yd)
IF1	Multiple trees were snapped or uprooted by this tornado, and a few sheds were destroyed. TORRO rated this tornado T2/3 while the ESSL rated it as IF1.						
IF1.5	Henley-on-Thames	Oxfordshire	United Kingdom	51.533°N 0.9°W	08:30	Unknown	Unknown
IF1.5	In the valley to the north, a number of mature broadleaved trees (oaks and ash), were uprooted and/or partially delimbed. One example of healthy mature Cherry with a 0.6m diameter trunk, had its trunk completely snapped off at the base.						
IF2	Torre de Juan Abad	Castilla-La Mancha	Spain	38.58°N 3.07°W	14:20	>4 km (2.5 mi)	>300 m (330 yd)
IF2	A strong tornado tracked through the northern part of Torre de Juan Abad, causing significant damage to homes, restaurants, auto repair shops, warehouses, and cars. Several brick and masonry buildings suffered major structural damage, including total roof loss and collapse of multiple exterior walls. The tornado also severely damaged farms in agricultural areas, and snapped or uprooted more than 1,000 olive trees. AEMET rated this tornado EF1 while the ESSL rated it as IF2.						
IF1	Vezin-le-Coquet	Brittany	France	48.117°N 1.75°W	14:21	0.8 km (0.50 mi)	Unknown
IF1	Downed trees and damaged roofs were reported. Tornado is possible in this case.						

=== 31 January event ===
List of confirmed tornadoes – Friday, 31 January 2025
EF#	Location	Region	Country	Start coord.	Time (UTC)	Path length	Max. width
IFU	Villeneuve-Loubet	Provence-Alpes-Côte d'Azur	France	43.63°N 7.14°E	15:00	Unknown	Unknown
IFU	A waterspout made landfall and briefly became a weak tornado, causing no reported damage. This tornado was rated EF0 by Keraunos. (Note: The European Enhanced Fujita (EF) Scale rates tornadoes without damage indicators as EF0. However, such tornadoes are left unrated on the International Fujita (IF) Scale, represented here as IFU, where the U stands for unknown or unrated.)						

== February ==
IFU	IF0	IF0.5	IF1	IF1.5	IF2	IF2.5	IF3	IF4	IF5	Total
0	1	2	1	0	1	0	0	0	0	5

=== 1 February event ===
List of confirmed tornadoes – Saturday, 1 February 2025
EF#	Location	Region	Country	Start coord.	Time (UTC)	Path length	Max. width
IF0	Cavalaire-sur-Mer	Provence-Alpes-Côte d'Azur	France	43.17°N 6.53°E	04:40	Unknown	Unknown
IF0	A landfalling waterspout caused minor damage to buildings.						

=== 11 February event ===
List of confirmed tornadoes – Tuesday, 11 February 2025
IF#	Location	Region	Country	Start coord.	Time (UTC)	Path length	Max. width
IF2	E of Ayamonte	Andalusia	Spain	37.22°N 7.32°W	14:15	4 km (2.5 mi)	100 m (110 yd)
IF2	More than 30 homes had roof and exterior damage in the Pozo del Camino community. Trees and power lines were downed, and free-standing masonry walls were blown over. The ESSL rated this tornado as IF1.5, but an on-site investigation by AEMET found IF2-level intensity.						

=== 14 February event ===
List of confirmed tornadoes – Friday, 14 February 2025
IF#	Location	Region	Country	Start coord.	Time (UTC)	Path length	Max. width
IF0.5	Bacoli	Campania	Italy	40.80°N 14.08°E	12:00	1.2 km (0.75 mi)	Unknown
IF0.5	A brief waterspout hit a deck and light damage occurred to a roof.						

== March ==
IFU	IF0	IF0.5	IF1	IF1.5	IF2	IF2.5	IF3	IF4	IF5	Total
7	0	5	6	5	0	0	0	0	0	23

=== 3 March event ===
List of confirmed tornadoes – Monday, 3 March 2025
IF#	Location	Region	Country	Start coord.	Time (UTC)	Path length	Max. width
IF0.5	W of Liapades	Ionian Islands	Greece	39.67°N 19.74°E	11:32	Unknown	Unknown
IF0.5	This weak tornado broke large tree branches off of trees, damaged roofs, and damaged power poles.						

=== 8 March event ===
List of confirmed tornadoes – Saturday, 8 March 2025
IF#	Location	Region	Country	Start coord.	Time (UTC)	Path length	Max. width
IF1.5	Palos de la Frontera to Moguer	Andalusia	Spain	37.14°N 6.83°W	05:10	4 km (2.5 mi)	80 m (87 yd)
IF1.5	A strong waterspout made landfall in an urban area before moving into a military base, reaching peak intensity in a pine forest, and finally weakening as it tracked through a greenhouse area before dissipating.						
IF1.5	La Algaba to Alcalá del Río	Andalusia	Spain	37.48°N 6.01°W	10:20	1 km (0.62 mi)	40 m (44 yd)
IF1.5	This tornado struck an industrial area, causing damage to at least one warehouse and multiple power poles. Less severe roof and vegetation damage also occurred. The ESSL rated the tornado as IF1+, and an on-site investigation by AEMET found IF1.5 intensity.						

=== 10 March event ===
List of confirmed tornadoes – Monday, 10 March 2025
IF#	Location	Region	Country	Start coord.	Time (UTC)	Path length	Max. width
IF0.5	El Puerto de Santa María	Andalusia	Spain	36.58°N 6.26°W	05:00	Unknown	Unknown
IF0.5	This tornado caused some roof damage in El Puerto de Santa María.						
IFU	E of Inca	Balearic Islands	Spain	39.72°N 2.93°E	12:40	Unknown	Unknown
IFU	A tornado briefly made contact with the ground on the island of Majorca, kicking up some dust and causing no reported damage.						

=== 12 March event ===
List of confirmed tornadoes – Wednesday, 12 March 2025
EF#	Location	Region	Country	Start coord.	Time (UTC)	Path length	Max. width
IFU	Biscarrosse	Nouvelle-Aquitaine	France	44.40°N 1.17°W	09:00	0.2 km (0.12 mi)	Unknown
IFU	Multiple waterspouts appeared off the coast of Biscarrosse during a thunderstorm. One of them came ashore and moved into uninhabited sand dunes, kicking up sand and small vegetation. Keraunos rated this tornado as EF0.						

=== 13 March event ===
List of confirmed tornadoes – Thursday, 13 March 2025
EF#	Location	Region	Country	Start coord.	Time (UTC)	Path length	Max. width
IF1.5	Orihuela	Valencia	Spain	37.995°N 0.877°W	16:45-16:46	Unknown	Unknown
IF1.5	A very brief tornado formed near Barrio del Molino in the outskirts of Orihuela. It knocked down trees and a transmission tower, caused minor roof damage, and collapsed part an agricultural warehouse wall. AEMET rated this tornado EF0/T0.						

=== 15 March event ===
List of confirmed tornadoes – Saturday, 15 March 2025
IF#	Location	Region	Country	Start coord.	Time (UTC)	Path length	Max. width
IF0.5	Bentivoglio	Emilia-Romagna	Italy	44.64°N 11.41°E	14:00	2.68 km (1.67 mi)	150 m (160 yd)
IF0.5	Some buildings sustained roof damage along the outskirts of Bentivoglio, trees and signs were blown over, and a trash can was thrown 150 m (160 yd).						
IFU	Malalbergo	Emilia-Romagna	Italy	44.65°N 11.49°E	14:15	Unknown	Unknown
IFU	A tornado touched down, causing no reported damage.						
IFU	Argenta	Emilia-Romagna	Italy	44.69°N 11.64°E	15:03	Unknown	Unknown
IFU	A tornado touched down, causing no reported damage.						
IF0.5	Voghiera	Emilia-Romagna	Italy	44.73°N 11.73°E	15:18	Unknown	Unknown
IF0.5	This tornado caused light roof damage occurred, downed a tree, and scattered debris in a field.						
IFU	Portomaggiore	Emilia-Romagna	Italy	44.72°N 11.77°E	15:21	Unknown	Unknown
IFU	A tornado touched down, causing no reported damage.						

=== 17 March event ===
List of confirmed tornadoes – Monday, 17 March 2025
IF#	Location	Region	Country	Start coord.	Time (UTC)	Path length	Max. width
IF1	N of Lepe	Andalusia	Spain	37.28°N 7.19°W	17:50	Unknown	Unknown
IF1	A tornado destroyed several greenhouses to the north of Lepe.						
IF1	Palos de la Frontera	Andalusia	Spain	37.21°N 6.91°W	18:40	Unknown	Unknown
IF1	Storm Laurence spawned a nighttime tornado in the Palos de la Frontera area. Some walls were knocked down. and light poles and cables were damaged. There was also damage to greenhouses and crop areas. A child was injured after a wall collapsed on them.						
IF1	NE of Moguer	Andalusia	Spain	37.29°N 6.77°W	19:30	Unknown	Unknown
IF1	A tornado destroyed several greenhouses to the northeast of Moguer. A historic pine tree at Fuentepiña, emblematic of Juan Ramón Jiménez's Platero and I, suffered heavy damage during the storm.						
IF1.5	NW of Conil de la Frontera	Andalusia	Spain	36.30°N 6.12°W	21:10	Unknown	Unknown
IF1.5	This tornado impacted the Fuente del Gallo community to the northwest of Conil de la Frontera, inflicting considerable roof damage to homes and buildings. Trees and power poles were downed, and masonry fences were knocked over.						

=== 20 March event ===
List of confirmed tornadoes – Thursday, 20 March 2025
IF#	Location	Region	Country	Start coord.	Time (UTC)	Path length	Max. width
IF1	El Rompido	Andalusia	Spain	37.22°N 7.12°W	01:45	Unknown	Unknown
IF1	A waterspout caused roof damage in El Rompido when it moved ashore.						

=== 21 March event ===
List of confirmed tornadoes – Friday, 21 March 2025
EF#	Location	Region	Country	Start coord.	Time (UTC)	Path length	Max. width
IF0.5	Chemazé	Pays de la Loire	France	47.78°N 0.77°W	18:07	Unknown	Unknown
IF0.5	A tornado was recorded causing roof and tree damage. It was rated as a high-end EF0 tornado by Keraunos.						

=== 22 March event ===
List of confirmed tornadoes – Saturday, 22 March 2025
EF#	Location	Region	Country	Start coord.	Time (UTC)	Path length	Max. width
IF1.5	Gonfaron	Provence-Alpes-Côte d'Azur	France	43.32°N 6.28°E	19:00	0.4 km (0.25 mi)	Unknown
IF1.5	A brief tornado struck Gonfaron, causing damage to 15 houses, a vehicle, a hangar, and a telephone pole. Road signs and a billboard were knocked down, with debris being carried 3 km (1.9 mi) away. It was rated as a low-end EF1 tornado by Météo-Varoise but as an EF0 tornado by Keraunos.						

=== 23 March event ===
List of confirmed tornadoes – Sunday, 23 March 2025
IF#	Location	Region	Country	Start coord.	Time (UTC)	Path length	Max. width
IFU	Rapallo	Liguria	Italy	44.35°N 9.23°E	08:18-08:21	0.7 km (0.43 mi)	Unknown
IFU	A waterspout moved boats in a port before moving onshore, causing no reported damage.						
IF1	La Seyne-sur-Mer	Provence-Alpes-Côte d'Azur	France	43.10°N 5.88°E	14:20	Unknown	Unknown
IF1	A weak tornado damaged trees and vegetation along a narrow swath of the Janas forest on the Cap Sicié peninsula. It was rated EF0 by Keraunos.						

=== 28 March event ===
List of confirmed tornadoes – Friday, 28 March 2025
IF#	Location	Region	Country	Start coord.	Time (UTC)	Path length	Max. width
IFU	Santa Cesarea Terme	Apulia	Italy	40.03°N 18.45°E	11:21-11:30	Unknown	Unknown
IFU	Twin waterspouts occurred, the first of which made landfall but caused no reported damage.						

=== 30 March event ===
List of confirmed tornadoes – Sunday, 30 March 2025
IF#	Location	Region	Country	Start coord.	Time (UTC)	Path length	Max. width
IF1	SE of Perleberg	Brandenburg	Germany	53.04°N 11.901°E	12:25	1.3 km (0.81 mi)	40 m (44 yd)
IF1	Amid a strong thunderstorm, a tornado struck just northwest of the town of Uenze, damaging roofs and vegetation. Debris was thrown up to 600 m (660 yd).						

== April ==
IFU	IF0	IF0.5	IF1	IF1.5	IF2	IF2.5	IF3	IF4	IF5	Total
5	1	2	9	4	2	0	0	0	0	23

=== 1 April event ===
List of confirmed tornadoes – Tuesday, 1 April 2025
IF#	Location	Region	Country	Start coord.	Time (UTC)	Path length	Max. width
IF1	Rhodes	South Aegean	Greece	36.45°N 28.22°E	09:54	Unknown	Unknown
IF1	This tornado hit downtown Rhodes, damaging buildings, trees, and cars.						

=== 4 April event ===
List of confirmed tornadoes – Friday, 4 April 2025
IF#	Location	Region	Country	Start coord.	Time (UTC)	Path length	Max. width
IF1	San Bartolomé de la Torre	Andalusia	Spain	37.43°N 7.10°W	07:05	Unknown	Unknown
IF1	This tornado injured four workers when it caused a greenhouse to collapse.						
IF1	Moguer	Andalusia	Spain	37.28°N 6.81°W	07:40	Unknown	Unknown
IF1	A tornado hit areas of Moguer, damaging trees and farms.						
IF2	NE of Coria del Río to S of Seville	Andalusia	Spain	37.27°N 6.04°W	09:35	7.6 km (4.7 mi)	50 m (55 yd)
IF2	3 deaths – A strong tornado killed three people in an agricultural warehouse in the Coria del Río area.						

=== 17 April event ===
List of confirmed tornadoes – Thursday, 17 April 2025
IF#	Location	Region	Country	Start coord.	Time (UTC)	Path length	Max. width
IF1	Southern Verona	Veneto	Italy	45.40°N 10.97°E	13:55	3.2 km (2.0 mi)	70 m (77 yd)
IF1	A tornado damaged roofs, trees, and greenhouses in Southern Verona. Light objects were lofted and two power poles were snapped.						

=== 18 April event ===
List of confirmed tornadoes – Friday, 18 April 2025
IF#	Location	Region	Country	Start coord.	Time (UTC)	Path length	Max. width
IFU	Bečej	South Bačka	Serbia	45.67°N 20.00°E	09:40	Unknown	Unknown
IFU	A funnel cloud was observated briefly touching the ground, causing no reported damage.						

=== 19 April event ===
List of confirmed tornadoes – Saturday, 19 April 2025
IF#	Location	Region	Country	Start coord.	Time (UTC)	Path length	Max. width
IF1	Cuzance to Cressensac-Sarrazac	Occitania	France	44.97°N 1.55°E	12:30	9.1 km (5.7 mi)	150 m (160 yd)
IF1	A tornado uprooted about 200 walnut trees and damaged roofs, agricultural facilities, and infrastructure. Keraunos rated this tornado as EF1 while the ESSL rated it as IF1.						
IFU	Cavanac	Occitania	France	43.17°N 2.33°E	14:07	0.3 km (0.19 mi)	Unknown
IFU	A weak tornado was observed affecting small vegetation.						

=== 21 April event ===
List of confirmed tornadoes – Monday, 21 April 2025
IF#	Location	Region	Country	Start coord.	Time (UTC)	Path length	Max. width
IF1.5	NE of Bologoye	Tver	Russia	58.0653°N 34.4350°E	12:00	4.55 km (2.83 mi)	390 m (430 yd)
IF1.5	A tornado scar was noted on Sentinel-2 satellite imagery.						

=== 23 April event ===
List of confirmed tornadoes – Wednesday, 23 April 2025
IF#	Location	Region	Country	Start coord.	Time (UTC)	Path length	Max. width
IF0	Chaumont-Gistoux	Walloon Brabant	Belgium	50.68°N 4.73°E	17:22–17:29	0.5 km (0.31 mi)	50 m (55 yd)
IF0	This weak, brief, but well-documented tornado caused minor damage to vegetation and very minor roof damage near the village of Dion-le-Mont in Chaumont-Gistoux municipality. Belgorage rated this tornado as F0/T0 while the ESSL rated it IF0.						

=== 25 April event ===
List of confirmed tornadoes – Friday, 25 April 2025
IF#	Location	Region	Country	Start coord.	Time (UTC)	Path length	Max. width
IFU	Northern Minsk	Minsk	Belarus	53.95°N 27.55°E	10:00	Unknown	Unknown
IFU	A landspout tornado was observed in rural areas near the Sel'khozposolok district in the northern part of Minsk. No damage was reported.						

=== 27 April event ===
List of confirmed tornadoes – Sunday, 27 April 2025
IF#	Location	Region	Country	Start coord.	Time (UTC)	Path length	Max. width
IFU	N of Viterbo	Lazio	Italy	42.47°N 12.09°E	13:50	1.2 km (0.75 mi)	25 m (27 yd)
IFU	A brief tornado was observed, leaving a small scar through grassy fields visible on satellite imagery. No further damage was reported.						

== May ==
IFU	IF0	IF0.5	IF1	IF1.5	IF2	IF2.5	IF3	IF4	IF5	Total
16	2	3	21	8	0	0	0	0	0	50

=== 2 May event ===
List of confirmed tornadoes – Friday, 2 May 2025
IF#	Location	Region	Country	Start coord.	Time (UTC)	Path length	Max. width
IF1.5	E of Beja	Beja	Portugal	38.02°N 7.79°W	07:09–07:11	1.2 km (0.75 mi)	Unknown
IF1.5	A tornado struck the village of Porto Peles, causing significant roof and tree damage. The IPMA rated this tornado as F1/T2/IF1.5, a rating that the ESSL reaffirmed.						
IF1	Campo Maior	Portalegre	Portugal	39.06°N 7.12°W	12:00	0.7 km (0.43 mi)	Unknown
IF1	A tornado in the Degolados parish of Campo Maior damaged houses, sheds, football field, power lines, and trees. One person was treated at the scene by first responders. The IPMA rated this tornado as F1/T2/IF1.						
IF1	Calera y Chozas	Castilla–La Mancha	Spain	38.882°N 4.9819°W	13:15	1.3 km (0.81 mi)	60 m (66 yd)
IF1	Tornado associated with passage of cumulonimbus. Photo shows clear funnel and tornadic damage was found in the area.						
IFU	Stemwede	North Rhine-Westphalia	Germany	52.4670°N 8.5000°W	13:23	Unknown	Unknown
IFU	An uncondensed tornado was recorded.						

=== 3 May event ===
List of confirmed tornadoes – Saturday, 3 May 2025
IF#	Location	Region	Country	Start coord.	Time (UTC)	Path length	Max. width
IFU	Sesimbra	Setúbal	Portugal	38.44°N 9.11°W	07:06–07:07	Unknown	Unknown
IFU	A waterspout sunk some boats before briefly making landfall.						
IF1	Sardoal	Santarém	Portugal	39.53°N 8.17°W	11:42–11:44	3 km (1.9 mi)	Unknown
IF1	A large tornado downed trees, some of which landed on houses. Damage to high voltage power lines was reported.						
IF1.5	SE Waldkappel	Hesse	Germany	51.09°N 9.79°E	15:10	1.7 km (1.1 mi)	110 m (120 yd)
IF1.5	A tornado tracked over the Waldkappel district of Stolzhausen, causing some roof damage and considerable forest damage.						
IF1.5	S of Biebertal	Hesse	Germany	50.62°N 8.56°E	15:52	3.5 km (2.2 mi)	290 m (320 yd)
IF1.5	This tornado uprooted and snapped several trees before entering Rodheim-Bieber and causing minor damage to the roofs of buildings.						
IF1	Reichenbach im Vogtland to Lengenfeld	Saxony	Germany	50.61°N 12.30°E	18:48	6.25 km (3.88 mi)	220 m (240 yd)
IF1	This tornado caused moderate damage to trees and some buildings.						

=== 4 May event ===
List of confirmed tornadoes – Sunday, 4 May 2025
IF#	Location	Region	Country	Start coord.	Time (UTC)	Path length	Max. width
IF1	Rechki	Mogilev	Belarus	54.0301°N 30.2341°E	13:35	Unknown	Unknown
IF1	In the Mogilev region, the roofs of two residential buildings and 12 agricultural buildings were damaged. In the agro-town of Rechki, several residential buildings were damaged (possibly more). 3.5 km to the east, northeast of the agro-town, a windthrow was found based on a satellite image						
IF1	W of Drybin	Mogilev	Belarus	54.13°N 31.03°E	14:40	Unknown	Unknown
IF1	A tornado touched down near Novaye Prybuzhzha, causing light roof damage.						

=== 7 May event ===
List of confirmed tornadoes – Wednesday, 7 May 2025
IF#	Location	Region	Country	Start coord.	Time (UTC)	Path length	Max. width
IFU	S of Horia	Tulcea	Romania	44.98°N 28.45°E	14:15	Unknown	Unknown
IFU	A landspout tornado occurred over open land between Horia and Atmagea, causing no reported damage.						

=== 8 May event ===
List of confirmed tornadoes – Thursday, 8 May 2025
IF#	Location	Region	Country	Start coord.	Time (UTC)	Path length	Max. width
IF1	NNE of Svetlyi	Orenburg	Russia	51.44°N 61.16°E	11:45	Unknown	Unknown
IF1	This tornado struck the small village of Tobolsky, killing cows and damaging farm machines.						
IFU	N of Lipovu	Dolj	Romania	44.14°N 23.60°E	15:25	Unknown	Unknown
IFU	A tornado was observed tracking over open fields, soon becoming rain-wrapped. No damage was reported.						

=== 9 May event ===
List of confirmed tornadoes – Friday, 9 May 2025
IF#	Location	Region	Country	Start coord.	Time (UTC)	Path length	Max. width
IF1.5	Pavlohrad	Dnipropetrovsk	Ukraine	48.52°N 35.87°E	16:00	Unknown	Unknown
IF1.5	A tornado tore off roofs, uprooted trees, and downed power lines.						

=== 10 May event ===
List of confirmed tornadoes – Saturday, 10 May 2025
IF#	Location	Region	Country	Start coord.	Time (UTC)	Path length	Max. width
IFU	NE of Cabañas de Ebro	Aragon	Spain	41.81°N 1.14°W	12:45	Unknown	Unknown
IFU	A tornado was observed over farmland with no reported damage.						
IF0	E of Vilnius	Vilnius	Lithuania	54.683°N 25.317°E	13:32	Unknown	Unknown
IF0	Brief lanspout tornado observed. Whirl passed by close to trees. No damage to trees (apart from some leaves whirling in the air).						
IF1.5	S of Cherkessk	Karachay-Cherkessia	Russia	44.223°N 42.046°E	14:30	Unknown	Unknown
IF1.5	Tornado hit areas near Cherkessk town. Trees snapped, power lines damaged.						

=== 12 May event ===
List of confirmed tornadoes – Monday, 12 May 2025
IF#	Location	Region	Country	Start coord.	Time (UTC)	Path length	Max. width
IFU	Chornobai	Cherkasy	Ukraine	49.67°N 32.33°E	12:00	Unknown	Unknown
IFU	A landspout tornado occurred, causing no reported damage.						

=== 14 May event ===
List of confirmed tornadoes – Wednesday, 14 May 2025
IF#	Location	Region	Country	Start coord.	Time (UTC)	Path length	Max. width
IFU	Villamañán area	Castile and León	Spain	42.32°N 5.57°W	18:00	Unknown	Unknown
IFU	A tornado was observed, causing no reported damage.						

=== 17 May event ===
List of confirmed tornadoes – Saturday, 17 May 2025
IF#	Location	Region	Country	Start coord.	Time (UTC)	Path length	Max. width
IFU	San Lucido	Calabria	Italy	39.30°N 16.05°E	10:20	Unknown	Unknown
IFU	A waterspout made landfall, causing no reported damage.						

=== 18 May event ===
List of confirmed tornadoes – Sunday, 18 May 2025
IF#	Location	Region	Country	Start coord.	Time (UTC)	Path length	Max. width
IF1	NW Český Krumlov	South Bohemia	Czech Republic	48.83°N 14.30°E	10:45	1 km (0.62 mi)	100 m (110 yd)
IF1	A tornado affected the village of Vyšný, primarily uprooting and snapping trees.						
IFU	E of Bieganowo	Greater Poland	Poland	52.2650°N 17.6910°E	18:00	Unknown	Unknown
IFU	A brief tornado was observed.						

=== 22 May event ===
List of confirmed tornadoes – Thursday, 22 May 2025
IF#	Location	Region	Country	Start coord.	Time (UTC)	Path length	Max. width
IF1	NE of Monfumo to Pederobba to Valdobbiadene	Veneto	Italy	45.86°N 11.99°E	14:30	8.4 km (5.2 mi)	300 m (330 yd)
IF1	This tornado touched down to the northeast of Monfumo, causing tree damage and flattening grass. It then entered the Onigo subdivision of Pederobba, damaging roofs and lofting debris. It crossed the Piave River, moving through into Bigolino (part of Valdobbiadene) and dissipating shortly thereafter.						
IF0.5	Valvasone	Friuli-Venezia Giulia	Italy	45.99°N 12.87°E	15:30	1.5 km (0.93 mi)	140 m (150 yd)
IF0.5	A brief tornado moved through Valvasone, moving light objects and causing minor tree and roof damage.						
IF1	SSW of San Daniele del Friuli	Friuli-Venezia Giulia	Italy	46.14°N 12.95°E	15:40	1.6 km (0.99 mi)	220 m (240 yd)
IF1	A thin area of forest was damaged by this tornado.						
IF1	Dignano	Friuli-Venezia Giulia	Italy	46.09°N 12.95°E	15:45	6.3 km (3.9 mi)	150 m (160 yd)
IF1	This tornado touched down to the south of the village of Bonzicco, part of the Dignano municipality. It tracked north-northeast, moving through Dignano, where it damaged the town's school. It continued east of the Vidulis subdivision, eventually dissipating over open land. Damage to trees, roofs, and small structures occurred throughout the path, with relatively small debris thrown up to hundreds of meters away.						
IF1	Buja	Friuli-Venezia Giulia	Italy	46.20°N 13.13°E	16:25	1.5 km (0.93 mi)	50 m (55 yd)
IF1	A brief tornado touched down over open land, causing vegetation damage. It moved into the Arba subdivision of Buja, seriously damaging one roof and removing a large door before dissipating.						
IFU	Radostów	Lublin	Poland	50.58°N 23.88°E	19:28	Unknown	Unknown
IFU	A tornado was observed over open land, causing no reported damage.						

=== 23 May event ===
List of confirmed tornadoes – Friday, 23 May 2025
IF#	Location	Region	Country	Start coord.	Time (UTC)	Path length	Max. width
IFU	NE of Volochysk	Khmelnytskyi	Ukraine	49.6330°N 26.3170°E	14:00	Unknown	Unknown
IFU	A landspout was observed in Yakhnivtsi. No known damage occurred.						

=== 24 May event ===
List of confirmed tornadoes – Saturday, 24 May 2025
IF#	Location	Region	Country	Start coord.	Time (UTC)	Path length	Max. width
IF1	W of Idritsa	Pskov	Russia	56.3590°N 28.7360°E	15:45	4.4 km (2.7 mi)	900 m (980 yd)
IF1	A tornado scar was noted on Sentinel-2 satellite imagery.						

=== 28 May event ===
List of confirmed tornadoes – Wednesday, 28 May 2025
IF#	Location	Region	Country	Start coord.	Time (UTC)	Path length	Max. width
IF1	SE Biebergemünd	Hesse	Germany	50.16°N 9.32°E	13:12	2.1 km (1.3 mi)	30 m (33 yd)
IF1	A tornado moved over the Bieber village of Biebergemünd, causing roof and tree damage.						
IF1.5	Hessisch Lichtenau	Hesse	Germany	51.20°N 9.71°E	14:53	1.4 km (0.87 mi)	20 m (22 yd)
IF1.5	This tornado formed near the center of town, initially causing minor roof and tree damage. Intensifying as it moved through town, a small caravan was overturned and destroyed. It continued producing roof damage, additionally bending road signs and a maple tree at peak intensity, dissipating shortly thereafter.						
IFU	Steinau an der Straße	Hesse	Germany	50.31°N 9.46°E	15:17	Unknown	Unknown
IFU	A tornado was observed, causing no known damage.						
IF1	Teresin	Greater Poland	Poland	53.02°N 16.50°E	15:40	Unknown	Unknown
IF1	This brief tornado caused minor roof and tree damage in the Trzcianka area.						
IF1	Hammerbrücke to Klingenthal	Saxony	Germany	50.430°N 12.414°E	16:30	6.6 km (4.1 mi)	130 m (140 yd)
IF1	A tornado moved through forested areas.						
IFU	Theres	Bavaria	Germany	50.02°N 10.42°E	16:31	Unknown	Unknown
IFU	A tornado was observed, causing no known damage.						
IF0.5	Riedseltz	Grand Est	France	48.99°N 7.95°E	18:10–18:25	6.8 km (4.2 mi)	80 m (87 yd)
IF0.5	This high-end EF0/IF0.5 tornado first verifiably touched down in the northern part of Riedseltz, where it caused minor roof damage as it passed over a housing estate. Continuing into southern Wissembourg, a microlight club was affected. Finally, it dissipated near the heart of Schleithal. The rotation persisted, although no further damage was identified.						
IF1	Egloffstein	Bavaria	Germany	50.2422°N 11.1183°E	18:31	0.35 km (0.22 mi)	50 m (55 yd)
IF1	Several roofs and trees were damaged within a 50-metre-wide path running through the entire village of Bieberbach. The characteristics of the path and the damage, in combination with radar analysis, confirm that a tornado occurred. The tornado's path was likely longer.						

== June ==
IFU	IF0	IF0.5	IF1	IF1.5	IF2	IF2.5	IF3	IF4	IF5	Total
7	3	4	16	15	8	0	0	0	0	55

- Note: Two tornadoes have been confirmed but have not been rated yet.

=== 1 June event ===
List of confirmed tornadoes – Sunday, 1 June 2025
IF#	Location	Region	Country	Start coord.	Time (UTC)	Path length	Max. width
IF2	N of Job to Roche-en-Forez to Lérigneux to S of Écotay-l'Olme	Auvergne-Rhône-Alpes	France	45.61°N 3.95°E	19:04	20.9 km (13.0 mi)	550 m (600 yd)
IF2	A powerful EF2/IF2 tornado tracked across the Forez mountains in Central France, particularly affecting the commune of Roche-en-Forez and injuring one person. The first tornadic damage was identified north of Job in the Puy-de-Dôme department, where wide swaths of forest were damaged or destroyed at EF1 intensity. Wind damage was identified at an earlier point, although it was unclear whether it was caused by the tornado or the parent supercell's rear flank downdraft. The tornado continued damaging trees in forested area as it passed into the Loire department, crossing over a mountain peak at an elevation of 1,503 m (4,931 ft), thus becoming the highest-elevation tornado ever recorded in France. In Roche-en-Forez, many trees were snapped or uprooted with some even being debarked. Several properties were also affected, including one building with its entire roof ripped off. Outbuildings were also heavily damaged and debris was thrown into nearby fields. In this area, the tornado was at EF1-2 intensity. Moving through the commune, the tornado would reach its maximum intensity of EF2 strength. Every tree in the path was uprooted and debranched, with some debarked, and power lines were downed. Several buildings were badly damaged, including another with its roof entirely ripped off and exterior walls damaged, with debris carried away long distances. It slightly weakened as it continued, although a stone cross attached to a monument was ripped off by the winds. The tornado moved downhill, widening as it approached Lérigneux where similar damage occurred at a slightly lower intensity as in Roche-en-Forez: many buildings and trees in the area were damaged. Northwest of Bard, a caravan was destroyed amid other damages. A nearby weather station recorded winds of 167 km/h (104 mph). The tornado moved through a housing estate in Bard, where buildings and trees were damaged. Weakening, the caused more minor tree damage in Verrières-en-Forez before dissipating in Écotay-l'Olme.						

=== 2 June event ===
List of confirmed tornadoes – Monday, 2 June 2025
IF#	Location	Region	Country	Start coord.	Time (UTC)	Path length	Max. width
IF0	Limburgerhof	Rhineland-Palatinate	Germany	49.44°N 8.38°E	14:36	Unknown	Unknown
IF0	A tornado blew a plastic sheet onto a power line.						

=== 4 June event ===
List of confirmed tornadoes – Wednesday, 4 June 2025
IF#	Location	Region	Country	Start coord.	Time (UTC)	Path length	Max. width
IF2	Erbach to S Ulm to SW of Holzheim	Baden-Württemberg, Bavaria	Germany	48.323°N 9.901°E	16:58	15.5 km (9.6 mi)	310 m (340 yd)
IF2	This strong tornado affected areas in the Ulm area, particularly the village of Donaustetten. It touched down south of Erbach, causing low-end damage to trees and other vegetation. Rapidly intensifying, it expanded to its maximum width and snapped several birch trees at near-maximum intensity. Its track also left behind a well-defined convergent pattern over a field. Crossing the Danube, it suddenly narrowed before entering the more urban area of Donaustetten, where intense but relatively sporadic damage would occur, suggesting that the funnel was not in constant contact with the ground. The roof of a house, along with part of its truss, was partially blown off and thrown at peak intensity, a lamppost was bent, and vehicles were severely damaged. More roof and tree damage occurred as it passed through this same street. No significant damage was located for a stretch of about 200 m (220 yd) before a new, more continuous damage path began in the far eastern portion of the village. Roofs were partially blown off, a garden was heavily damaged, and a tree was uprooted before it exited the village and entered an adjacent field. From here, the tornado showed signs of weakening as it began to travel in a more northerly direction. It caused mainly low-end vegetation damage and knocked over a road sign as it passed north of Illerkirchberg, crossing the Iller River into Bavaria. It dissipated shortly after crossing the Autobahn 7, just southwest of Holzheim.						

=== 5 June event ===
List of confirmed tornadoes – Thursday, 5 June 2025
IF#	Location	Region	Country	Start coord.	Time (UTC)	Path length	Max. width
IF1.5	Musteika, LT to WNW of Pyershamaysk, BY	Alytus (LT), Grodno (BY)	Lithuania, Belarus	53.9267°N 24.4433°E	11:30–11:55	17 km (11 mi)	430 m (470 yd)
IF1.5	This tornado tracked through forested land, downing thousands of trees.						
IF0.5	Vršac	South Banat	Serbia	45.12°N 21.30°E	16:20	Unknown	Unknown
IF0.5	A small tornado broke off a few large tree branches in the Vršac area.						
IF1	Hjørring	North Jutland	Denmark	57.47°N 9.99°E	19:00	0.78 km (0.48 mi)	45 m (49 yd)
IF1	Strong roofs and some trees were damaged by this erratic landspout tornado.						
IF0	Ter Apel	Groningen	Netherlands	52.88°N 7.06°E	19:30	Unknown	Unknown
IF0	A weak tornado tore off a few tree branches.						

=== 7 June event ===
List of confirmed tornadoes – Saturday, 7 June 2025
IF#	Location	Region	Country	Start coord.	Time (UTC)	Path length	Max. width
IF1.5	NE of Bor	Nizhny Novgorod	Russia	56.43°N 44.31°E	12:00	Unknown	Unknown
IF1.5	A tornado near the village of Potemino snapped several pine trees.						
IF1	Süß	Bavaria	Germany	49.547°N 11.795°E	12:30	0.25 km (0.16 mi)	40 m (44 yd)
IF1	This tornado caused light tree and roof damage.						
IF?	Čeľadice	Nitra	Slovakia	48.33°N 18.25°E	16:30		
IF?	A damaging tornado was confirmed by the Slovak Hydrometeorological Institute (SHMI). More information to come.						
IF1	Glewitz area	Mecklenburg-Vorpommern	Germany	54.017°N 12.923°E	16:40	1.3 km (0.81 mi)	Unknown
IF1	This tornado began south of town and eventually dissipated to its east, causing tree damage throughout its path. A video captured by the Leyerhof Volunteer Fire Brigade showed a well-defined, broad funnel cloud displaying multiple vortices.						
IF1	Pulborough	West Sussex	United Kingdom	50.96°N 0.50°W	17:55	1.3 km (0.81 mi)	55 m (60 yd)
IF1	A tornado damaged or snapped several trees. It was rated T2 by TORRO and IF1 by the ESSL.						
IF1.5	Ath area	Hainaut	Belgium	50.63°N 3.78°E	17:35	2.9 km (1.8 mi)	100 m (110 yd)
IF1.5	An F1/T2–3 caused damage to vegetation and some buildings in the Ath area. The tornado first verifiably touched down near the village of Ormeignies. It may have touched down further southwest of here, but the damage was light and could not be assuredly attributed to the tornado. Here, the roof of a barn was heavily damaged at near-peak intensity. Later on, several poplar trees were debranched at peak intensity. It began to weaken as it crossed through a field. It caused minor roof damage in a neighborhood in the southern portion of Ath before dissipating.						
IF?	Flavacourt	Hauts-de-France	France	49.35°N 1.82°E	17:45	3 km (1.9 mi)	40 m (44 yd)
IF?	A tornado touched down between Flavacourt and Trie-Château, damaging a roof and downing branches. This tornado was rated EF0 by KERAUNOS.						
IFU	NW of Žvirgždaičiai	Marijampolė	Lithuania	54.84°N 22.93°E	18:33	Unknown	Unknown
IFU	A brief tornado was photographed near Keturnaujiena. No damage was reported.						

=== 8 June event ===
List of confirmed tornadoes – Sunday, 8 June 2025
IF#	Location	Region	Country	Start coord.	Time (UTC)	Path length	Max. width
IF1	SSW of Uglich	Yaroslavl	Russia	57.4300°N 38.2400°E	16:50	Unknown	Unknown
IF1	Numerous trees were uprooted or snapped and large tree branches were downed.						

=== 9 June event ===
List of confirmed tornadoes – Monday, 9 June 2025
IF#	Location	Region	Country	Start coord.	Time (UTC)	Path length	Max. width
IF2	NE of Nizma	Vologda	Russia	59.2320°N 40.3920°E	12:00	14 km (8.7 mi)	441 m (482 yd)
IF2	A tornado scar was noted on Sentinel-2 satellite imagery.						
IF1.5	W of Pavlovskaya	Vologda	Russia	59.7190°N 42.3950°E	14:40	11.7 km (7.3 mi)	900 m (980 yd)
IF1.5	A large tornado scar was noted on Sentinel-2 satellite imagery.						

=== 10 June event ===
List of confirmed tornadoes – Tuesday, 10 June 2025
IF#	Location	Region	Country	Start coord.	Time (UTC)	Path length	Max. width
IF0.5	Northern Greifswald	Mecklenburg-Vorpommern	Germany	54.095°N 13.369°E	13:05	0.9 km (0.56 mi)	35 m (38 yd)
IF0.5	A weak tornado moved over the northern part of the city, where tree branches were snapped, a roof was partially ripped off, and a trampoline was thrown a distance of 200 m (220 yd) over multi-story buildings.						

=== 14 June event ===
List of confirmed tornadoes – Saturday, 14 June 2025
IF#	Location	Region	Country	Start coord.	Time (UTC)	Path length	Max. width
IF1.5	W of Vakhrushi	Kirov	Russia	57.49°N 50.23°E	11:15	8.6 km (5.3 mi)	470 m (510 yd)
IF1.5	A strong tornado caused considerable damage in to a forest.						

=== 15 June event ===
List of confirmed tornadoes – Sunday, 15 June 2025
IF#	Location	Region	Country	Start coord.	Time (UTC)	Path length	Max. width
IF1.5	Baiersbronn	Baden-Württemberg	Germany	48.5873°N 8.3180°E	10:00	1.7 km (1.1 mi)	160 m (170 yd)
IF1.5	This tornado remained in forests, uprooting or snapping several hundred trees and snapping large tree branches.						
IF1.5	Baiersbronn	Baden-Württemberg	Germany	48.5873°N 8.3180°E	10:03	2.5 km (1.6 mi)	90 m (98 yd)
IF1.5	This tornado struck parts of Schönmünzach, damaging a few roofs and uprooting or snapping trees.						

=== 16 June event ===
List of confirmed tornadoes – Monday, 16 June 2025
IF#	Location	Region	Country	Start coord.	Time (UTC)	Path length	Max. width
IFU	Casalgrande	Emilia-Romagna	Italy	44.59°N 10.77°E	12:45	Unknown	Unknown
IFU	An anticyclonic tornado moved an excavator.						
IF1	Conza della Campania	Campania	Italy	40.88°N 15.27°E	14:25	3.1 km (1.9 mi)	90 m (98 yd)
IF1	A landspout tornado lightly damaged roofs, snapped or uprooted trees, and affected farmland. It may have started as a waterspout over a lake or crossed over it.						

=== 17 June event ===
List of confirmed tornadoes – Tuesday, 17 June 2025
IF#	Location	Region	Country	Start coord.	Time (UTC)	Path length	Max. width
IF2	Støren	Trøndelag	Norway	63.04°N 10.29°E	15:55		
IF2	A strong tornado struck a camping site. Caravans were tossed and heavily damaged or destroyed, outdoor furniture was tossed, light poles were downed, and a barn was destroyed. It likely crossed the Gaula River; more information on the path to come.						

=== 18 June event ===
List of confirmed tornadoes – Wednesday, 18 June 2025
IF#	Location	Region	Country	Start coord.	Time (UTC)	Path length	Max. width
IF2	N of Kagalnitskaya	Rostov	Russia	46.98°N 40.14°E	04:20	Unknown	Unknown
IF2	A powerful tornado snapped reinforced concrete poles near the village of Glubokii Yar.						
IF1	SW of Carlentini	Sicily	Italy	37.19°N 14.94°E	11:00	1.9 km (1.2 mi)	160 m (170 yd)
IF1	A tornado struck the community of Pedagaggi. In the area, a roof was severely damaged, trees were uprooted or snapped, power lines and gates were damaged, and two outbuildings were nearly destroyed. Flying debris also damaged cars. Additionally, a weather station recorded a wind gust of 132.1 km/h (82.1 mph) as the tornado moved over it.						

=== 20 June event ===
List of confirmed tornadoes – Friday, 20 June 2025
IF#	Location	Region	Country	Start coord.	Time (UTC)	Path length	Max. width
IFU	Cherdakly area	Ulyanovsk	Russia	54.31°N 48.91°E	05:00	Unknown	Unknown
IFU	A tornado was observed; no damage was reported.						
IFU	Lebyazhye area	Kirov	Russia	57.44°N 49.55°E	10:45	Unknown	Unknown
IFU	A tornado was observed; no damage was reported.						

=== 21 June event ===
List of confirmed tornadoes – Saturday, 21 June 2025
IF#	Location	Region	Country	Start coord.	Time (UTC)	Path length	Max. width
IF1	SW of Nolinsk	Kirov	Russia	57.48°N 49.84°E	11:30	Unknown	Unknown
IF1	A tornado damaged trees as it tracked through forests.						

=== 24 June event ===
List of confirmed tornadoes – Tuesday, 24 June 2025
IF#	Location	Region	Country	Start coord.	Time (UTC)	Path length	Max. width
IF1	Maru	Viljandi	Estonia	58.18°N 25.23°E	16:57	Unknown	Unknown
IF1	A weak tornado downed trees and knocked off the lid of a beehive.						
IF1.5	Kannu	Tartu	Estonia	58.30°N 27.04°E	18:22	Unknown	Unknown
IF1.5	A tornado caused damage to forests and crop fields.						
IF0.5	NE of Muskiz	Basque Country	Spain	43.333°N 3.1°W	20:09	Unknown	Unknown
IF0.5	Several trees were snapped in half and their tops tossed over 15 m (16 yd).						

=== 26 June event ===
List of confirmed tornadoes – Thursday, 26 June 2025
IF#	Location	Region	Country	Start coord.	Time (UTC)	Path length	Max. width
IF2	SE of Liebenwalde	Brandenburg	Germany	52.813°N 13.466°E	16:27	5.6 km (3.5 mi)	300 m (330 yd)
IF2	A multiple-vortex "hybrid tornado" triggered by an outflow boundary interaction caused significant tree damage in forested areas.						

=== 27 June event ===
List of confirmed tornadoes – Friday, 27 June 2025
IF#	Location	Region	Country	Start coord.	Time (UTC)	Path length	Max. width
IFU	S of Starobin	Gomel	Belarus	52.70°N 27.45°E	14:40	Unknown	Unknown
IFU	A tornado was observed by a storm chaser. No info on damage.						
IF0	W of Zhytkavichy	Gomel	Belarus	52.22°N 27.70°E	17:15	Unknown	Unknown
IF0	A weak tornado near the village of Liudenevichi broke a few tree branches.						

=== 28 June event ===
List of confirmed tornadoes – Saturday, 28 June 2025
IF#	Location	Region	Country	Start coord.	Time (UTC)	Path length	Max. width
IF1	NW of Lundersæter	Innlandet	Norway	60.37°N 11.88°E	15:25	3.38 km (2.10 mi)	160 m (170 yd)
IF1	A tornado tracked through rural forested areas.						
IF1.5	N of Lundersæter	Innlandet	Norway	60.33°N 12.23°E	16:00	3.25 km (2.02 mi)	150 m (160 yd)
IF1.5	A tornado tracked through rural forested areas and crossed over a lake.						
IF0.5	N of Torsby	Värmland	Sweden	60.23°N 13.01°E	16:50	Unknown	Unknown
IF0.5	A weak tornado near the community of Fensbol downed trees and causing minor roof damage, additionally ripping the roof off of a small shed.						
IF1.5	NE of Torsby	Värmland	Sweden	60.20°N 13.24°E	17:10	9.88 km (6.14 mi)	510 m (560 yd)
IF1.5	Another tornado downed spruce trees, blocking off roads.						
IF1.5	NNE of Hagfors	Värmland	Sweden	60.14°N 13.84°E	18:00	8.32 km (5.17 mi)	465 m (509 yd)
IF1.5	A waterspout over a lake made landfall several times on the shore and on islands, where trees were damaged. A man was also thrown from his boat, but it is not known if he sustained injuries.						

== July ==
IFU	IF0	IF0.5	IF1	IF1.5	IF2	IF2.5	IF3	IF4	IF5	Total
23	6	9	5	5	6	0	0	0	0	55

- Note: One tornado has been confirmed but has not been rated yet

=== 3 July event ===
List of confirmed tornadoes – Thursday, 3 July 2025
IF#	Location	Region	Country	Start coord.	Time (UTC)	Path length	Max. width
IF2	SE of Parkano	Pirkanmaa	Finland	61.95°N 23.11°E	17:20	10.45 km (6.49 mi)	270 m (300 yd)
IF2	A strong tornado caused extensive tree damage as it tracked through unpopulated forests.						

=== 4 July event ===
List of confirmed tornadoes – Friday, 4 July 2025
IF#	Location	Region	Country	Start coord.	Time (UTC)	Path length	Max. width
IF0.5	Senorbì	Sardinia	Italy	39.52°N 9.13°E	12:42	1.1 km (0.68 mi)	20 m (22 yd)
IF0.5	A weak landspout tornado knocked over a fence and peeled sheet metal from a roof.						

=== 6 July event ===
List of confirmed tornadoes – Sunday, 6 July 2025
IF#	Location	Region	Country	Start coord.	Time (UTC)	Path length	Max. width
IF0	S of Saint-Amand-Longpré	Centre-Val de Loire	France	47.68°N 1.02°E	16:53	1.1 km (0.68 mi)	30 m (33 yd)
IF0	A weak tornado damaged shed roofs and broke tree branches.						

=== 7 July event ===
List of confirmed tornadoes – Monday, 7 July 2025
IF#	Location	Region	Country	Start coord.	Time (UTC)	Path length	Max. width
IFU	N of Trieste	Friuli-Venezia Giulia	Italy	45.70°N 13.72°E	01:02	Unknown	Unknown
IFU	A waterspout made landfall; no damage was reported.						
IF2	S of Gualdo Cattaneo	Umbria	Italy	42.87°N 12.52°E	09:40	2.7 km (1.7 mi)	80 m (87 yd)
IF2	A strong tornado primarily caused vegetation damage as many trees were downed or debranched and fields were damaged. Lesser damage also occurred to roofs and power lines. Some debris was also lofted long distances.						
IF1	Southern Berga	Saxony-Anhalt	Germany	51.452°N 11.006°E	10:17	1.0 km (0.62 mi)	30 m (33 yd)
IF1	A weak tornado tracked through Berga, causing light roof damage to many buildings. One girl was injured by flying debris.						
IFU	NE of Hohenmölsen	Saxony-Anhalt	Germany	51.17°N 12.11°E	15:20	Unknown	Unknown
IFU	A weak tornado was observed making ground contact. No damage was reported.						
IF2	Beloveža to Hažlín	Prešov	Slovakia	49.30°N 21.40°E	15:30	0.8 km (0.50 mi)	300 m (330 yd)
IF2	A strong tornado caused significant damage to trees and vegetation.						
IF1.5	Cigliano	Piedmont	Italy	45.31°N 8.02°E	18:10	2.0 km (1.2 mi)	50 m (55 yd)
IF1.5	This tornado started in crop fields before tracking into town, where it heavily damaged roofs, snapped tree branches, and collapsed a wall of a weakly constructed autorepair shop.						

=== 8 July event ===
List of confirmed tornadoes – Tuesday, 8 July 2025
IF#	Location	Region	Country	Start coord.	Time (UTC)	Path length	Max. width
IF1.5	Capaccio Paestum	Campania	Italy	40.39°N 15.00°E	04:58-05:06	0.4 km (0.25 mi)	70 m (77 yd)
IF1.5	A waterspout made landfall, damaging vehicles, trees, and fences; one truck cab (the driver's compartment of a truck) was blown over and another car's windows were blown out.						
IFU	Dębogóra area	Kuyavia–Pomerania	Poland	53.05°N 17.45°E	08:20	Unknown	Unknown
IFU	A brief landspout tornado was observed.						
IFU	Koper	Coastal–Karst	Slovenia	45.56°N 13.72°E	09:10	Unknown	Unknown
IFU	A waterspout made landfall near the port area of Koper; no damage was reported.						

=== 9 July event ===
List of confirmed tornadoes – Wednesday, 9 July 2025
IF#	Location	Region	Country	Start coord.	Time (UTC)	Path length	Max. width
IF2	N of Gorodok	Vitebsk	Belarus	55.58°N 29.98°E	14:10	Unknown	Unknown
IF2	A powerful tornado passed through village of Varkhi, damaging 29 buildings and downing many trees.						
IFU	NE of Ushachy	Vitebsk	Belarus	55.21°N 28.88°E	14:20	Unknown	Unknown
IFU	A tornado was observed; no damage was reported.						

=== 10 July event ===
List of confirmed tornadoes – Thursday, 10 July 2025
IF#	Location	Region	Country	Start coord.	Time (UTC)	Path length	Max. width
IF1.5	N of Polibino	Pskov	Russia	56.13°N 30.40°E	05:00	Unknown	Unknown
IF1.5	A strong tornado snapped and uprooted trees, damaged roofs, and knocked down power lines.						
IFU	Wahlstedt	Schleswig-Holstein	Germany	53.95°N 10.22°E	15:50	Unknown	Unknown
IFU	A long-lived funnel cloud briefly made ground contact.						

=== 13 July event ===
List of confirmed tornadoes – Sunday, 13 July 2025
IF#	Location	Region	Country	Start coord.	Time (UTC)	Path length	Max. width
IF0.5	Savona	Liguria	Italy	44.28°N 8.51°E	04:48	Unknown	Unknown
IF0.5	A waterspout made landfall on a beach, where it tossed outdoor furniture and light objects.						

=== 14 July event ===
List of confirmed tornadoes – Monday, 14 July 2025
IF#	Location	Region	Country	Start coord.	Time (UTC)	Path length	Max. width
IF0.5	Southern Niederwerth	Rhineland-Palatinate	Germany	50.386°N 7.612°E	15:00	0.35 km (0.22 mi)	35 m (38 yd)
IF0.5	A tornado damaged many trees.						

=== 15 July event ===
List of confirmed tornadoes – Tuesday, 15 July 2025
IF#	Location	Region	Country	Start coord.	Time (UTC)	Path length	Max. width
IFU	E of Luhavaya Slabada	Minsk	Belarus	53.7851°N 27.8542°E	10:30	Unknown	Unknown
IFU	A tornado damaged many trees.						
IF2	SW of Taufkirchen an der Pram	Upper Austria	Austria	48.407°N 13.535°E	13:05	Unknown	Unknown
IF2	The tornado touched down South-West of town, when it entered it partially collapsed walls, uprooted trees, damaged cars and destroyed roofs, no injuries were reported.						
IFU	W of Rumšiškės	Kaunas	Lithuania	54.85°N 24.2°E	17:20	Unknown	Unknown
IFU	Waterspout came ashore near Rumšiškės, no damage was reported.						

=== 16 July event ===
List of confirmed tornadoes – Wednesday, 16 July 2025
IF#	Location	Region	Country	Start coord.	Time (UTC)	Path length	Max. width
IFU	Westerland	Schleswig-Holstein	Germany	54.9050°N 8.2850°E	06:50	Unknown	Unknown
IFU	A tornado quickly moved offshore from a beach. No damage occurred.						
IFU	Schüttsiel	Schleswig-Holstein	Germany	54.69°N 8.725°E	06:56	Unknown	Unknown
IFU	A tornado was observed. No damage occurred.						

=== 18 July event ===
List of confirmed tornadoes – Friday, 18 July 2025
IF#	Location	Region	Country	Start coord.	Time (UTC)	Path length	Max. width
IFU	Ivenets area	Minsk	Belarus	53.8899°N 26.741°E	12:40	Unknown	Unknown
IFU	Several tornadoes were reported near Ivenets, no damage reported.						
IFU	Gorodeysky	Minsk	Belarus	53.3047°N 26.6243°E	18:00	Unknown	Unknown
IFU	Several tornadoes were reported near Ivenets, no damage reported.						

=== 19 July event ===
List of confirmed tornadoes – Saturday, 19 July 2025
IF#	Location	Region	Country	Start coord.	Time (UTC)	Path length	Max. width
IF0.5	Eldon	Durham	United Kingdom	54.63°N 1.65°W	14:11		
IF0.5	A tornado caused minor roof damage to sheds and houses. Vegetation was also lightly damaged.						
IFU	Samułki Duże	Podlaskie	Poland	52.90°N 23.03°E	16:40	Unknown	Unknown
IFU	A landspout tornado was observed.						
IFU	Mazyr	Gomel	Belarus	52.1°N 29.15°E	17:55	Unknown	Unknown
IFU	Tornado observed likely north of Mayzyr town. No damage was reported.						

=== 20 July event ===
List of confirmed tornadoes – Sunday, 20 July 2025
IF#	Location	Region	Country	Start coord.	Time (UTC)	Path length	Max. width
IF0.5	Cuckney	Nottinghamshire	United Kingdom	53.22°N 1.15°W	17:38	0.7 km (0.43 mi)	50 m (55 yd)
IF0.5	A weak tornado caused minor tree damage.						

=== 21 July event ===
List of confirmed tornadoes – Monday, 21 July 2025
IF#	Location	Region	Country	Start coord.	Time (UTC)	Path length	Max. width
IF0	Tours to Rochecorbon	Centre-Val de Loire	France	47.38°N 0.68°E	08:45	36 km (22 mi)	150 m (160 yd)
IF0	This tornado crossed the runway of Tours Airport, where several trees were uprooted. Six roofs were damaged as it continued on its path. Another tornado was confirmed in Rilly-sur-Loire, in the path of the parent supercell, which may have been the same tornado. Agricultural buildings, cars damaged. Branches and various objects are projected at a distance. In Rilly-sur-Loire, a century-old walnut tree uprooted, a badly damaged shed. Le Plessy farm camping also impacted and several uprooted trees in the surrounding forest. The tornado was also rated EF1 by keraunos.						
IF?	Chitenay	Centre-Val de Loire	France	47.4879°N 1.3447°E	09:32	9.8 km (6.1 mi)	Unknown
IF?	A small tornado uprooted trees or lopped off, a few small sections of roofing torn away, many agricultural buildings were damaged. Tornado is unable to receive rating for the time being due to lack of eye witness reports, it was rated EF0 by Kéraunos.						
IFU	Cormeilles-en-Vexin	Île-de-France	France	49.12°N 2.02°E	11:30	Unknown	Unknown
IFU	A tornado was observed; no damage was initially reported.						
IF1	Sernaglia della Battaglia to Pieve di Soligo	Veneto	Italy	45.88°N 12.14°E	11:45	5.7 km (3.5 mi)	190 m (210 yd)
IF1	This tornado touched down in the outskirts of Sernaglia della Battaglia, causing damage to trees, crops, greenhouse covers, roofs, and power lines along its path until dissipating in Pieve di Soligo.						
IFU	Lisse	South Holland	Netherlands	52.24°N 4.55°E	16:34	Unknown	Unknown
IFU	A tornado was observed; debris was seen in the air although no damage was reported.						

=== 23 July event ===
List of confirmed tornadoes – Wednesday, 23 July 2025
IF#	Location	Region	Country	Start coord.	Time (UTC)	Path length	Max. width
IF1	S of Vars-sur-Roseix	Nouvelle-Aquitaine	France	45.25°N 1.37°E	17:05	Unknown	Unknown
IF1	This brief, narrow tornado tracked for only a few hundred meters between two homes but caused concentrated damage along its short path. A house was severely impacted, with a large portion of the roof torn off in seconds, part of the living room ceiling collapsing, and debris such as garden furniture carried up to a kilometer away. Several trees were damaged, a cornfield was disturbed, and road signs were thrown dozens of meters, while the small, counterclockwise vortex was also seen lifting water from the roadway before dissipating in a nearby field.						
IF1	Sainte-Orse	Nouvelle-Aquitaine	France	45.2000°N 1.0830°W	17:18	2.6 km (1.6 mi)	100 m (110 yd)
IF1	Damage to the roofs of houses, outbuildings, and a sheep pen were reported alongside vehicle damage and downed power lines and trees.						
IF0.5	Chavagnac	Nouvelle-Aquitaine	France	45.0741°N 1.3773°W	18:30	1.9 km (1.2 mi)	80 m (87 yd)
IF0.5	A tornado damaged trees and a plastic greenhouse.						

=== 24 July event ===
List of confirmed tornadoes – Thursday, 24 July 2025
IF#	Location	Region	Country	Start coord.	Time (UTC)	Path length	Max. width
IF0	Celle Ligure	Liguria	Italy	44.34°N 8.54°E	07:10	Unknown	Unknown
IF0	A waterspout made landfall, where it affected boats and small objects. Two small boats were flipped and light objects in other boats were moved or lofted.						
IFU	Varazze	Liguria	Italy	44.35°N 8.56°E	09:50-10:26	Unknown	Unknown
IFU	Another waterspout made landfall; no damage was reported.						
IF1.5	N of Lipińskie Małe	Warmia-Masuria	Poland	53.772°N 22.395°E	09:53	Unknown	Unknown
IF1.5	This brief tornado caused considerable forest damage.						
IFU	Celle Ligure	Liguria	Italy	44.34°N 8.54°E	10:04-10:25	Unknown	Unknown
IFU	A waterspout made landfall, causing no known damage.						

=== 26 July event ===
List of confirmed tornadoes – Saturday, 26 July 2025
IF#	Location	Region	Country	Start coord.	Time (UTC)	Path length	Max. width
IF0.5	Tropea	Calabria	Italy	38.68°N 15.89°E	16:50	Unknown	Unknown
IF0.5	A waterspout made landfall, lofting umbrellas and light chairs.						
IF0	Nicotera	Calabria	Italy	38.54°N 15.93°E	17:08	Unknown	Unknown
IF0	Another nearby waterspout made landfall, rolling a lawn chair and drawing tarps upwards.						
IF0	Briatico	Calabria	Italy	38.73°N 16.05°E	17:15	Unknown	Unknown
IF0	A third waterspout made landfall, rolling an umbrella and a lawnchair and lofting light objects.						

=== 27 July event ===
List of confirmed tornadoes – Sunday, 27 July 2025
IF#	Location	Region	Country	Start coord.	Time (UTC)	Path length	Max. width
IF0	Falconara Albanese	Calabria	Italy	39.26°N 16.06°E	08:15	Unknown	Unknown
IF0	A waterspout flung objects on a beach.						
IFU	S of Pálfa	Tolna	Hungary	46.62°N 18.62°E	12:40	Unknown	Unknown
IFU	A landspout tornado remained over open fields.						

=== 28 July event ===
List of confirmed tornadoes – Monday, 28 July 2025
IF#	Location	Region	Country	Start coord.	Time (UTC)	Path length	Max. width
IF0.5	S of Monopoli	Apulia	Italy	40.89°N 17.34°E	15:20	2 km (1.2 mi)	280 m (310 yd)
IF0.5	A tornado lofted sheets from a greenhouse. Some greenhouses were also collapsed.						

=== 29 July event ===
List of confirmed tornadoes – Tuesday, 29 July 2025
IF#	Location	Region	Country	Start coord.	Time (UTC)	Path length	Max. width
IFU	Ehingen area	Baden-Württemberg	Germany	48.2670°N 9.8330°E	16:05	Unknown	Unknown
IFU	A tornado was observed by ponds.						
IF2	Eastern Kalodzishchy	Minsk	Belarus	53.93°N 27.82°E	18:45	5 km (3.1 mi)	400 m (440 yd)
IF2	This tornado touched down in forests southeast of town, where large swaths of forest were heavily damaged with almost all trees in the path being snapped or uprooted. Moving into the eastern portion of town, it damaged or destroyed roofs and power lines before dissipating.						

=== 30 July event ===
List of confirmed tornadoes – Wednesday, 30 July 2025
IF#	Location	Region	Country	Start coord.	Time (UTC)	Path length	Max. width
IFU	Custonaci	Sicily	Italy	38.09°N 12.65°E	06:10	Unknown	Unknown
IFU	A waterspout made landfall, causing no known damage.						
IF1	SW of Bramming	Southern Denmark	Denmark	55.423°N 8.66°E	10:25	0.11 km (0.068 mi)	45 m (49 yd)
IF1	A brief tornado touched down in the southeastern part of Store Darum and caused localized but noticeable damage within a small residential area. A playhouse and several sheds were blown away after their anchors failed, roof tiles were stripped from the corner of a newer masonry home, and a flagpole was snapped, likely by flying debris. Trampolines were reportedly lifted high into the air, with damage largely confined to nearby trees and structures along just a few streets before the tornado quickly dissipated.						

=== 31 July event ===
List of confirmed tornadoes – Thursday, 31 July 2025
IF#	Location	Region	Country	Start coord.	Time (UTC)	Path length	Max. width
IF1.5	NE of Malung	Dalarna	Sweden	60.73°N 13.82°E	13:05	2.4 km (1.5 mi)	150 m (160 yd)
IF1.5	A tornado downed dozens of trees in forests around the E45 highway.						
IFU	S of Balling	Central Denmark	Denmark	56.57°N 8.89°E	14:08-14:09	Unknown	Unknown
IFU	A landspout tornado was observed over the village of Rettrup, tossing objects at a property.						

== August ==
IFU	IF0	IF0.5	IF1	IF1.5	IF2	IF2.5	IF3	IF4	IF5	Total
19	2	7	7	7	2	0	0	0	0	48

- Note: Four tornadoes have been confirmed but has not been rated yet.

=== 1 August event ===
List of confirmed tornadoes – Friday, 1 August 2025
IF#	Location	Region	Country	Start coord.	Time (UTC)	Path length	Max. width
IF0.5	S of Stege	Zealand	Denmark	54.9759°N 12.2675°E	09:45	0.78 km (0.48 mi)	360 m (390 yd)
IF0.5	This relatively large yet weak tornado damaged a roof, uprooted trees and tossed outdoor furniture before moving over a Lagoon.						
IFU	S of Jebjerg	Central Denmark	Denmark	56.643°N 9.0135°E	16:50	Unknown	Unknown
IFU	A tornado was observed.						
IFU	Nowy Dwór	Greater Poland	Poland	52.28°N 15.95°E	16:57	Unknown	Unknown
IFU	A brief landspout tornado was observed; no damage was reported.						

=== 2 August event ===
List of confirmed tornadoes – Saturday, 2 August 2025
IF#	Location	Region	Country	Start coord.	Time (UTC)	Path length	Max. width
IF0.5	Wangerooge	Lower Saxony	Germany	53.79°N 7.90°E	07:52	Unknown	Unknown
IF0.5	A waterspout made landfall on a beach on northern Wangerooge island, moving and shifting some heavy beach chairs.						
IFU	Framura	Liguria	Italy	44.20°N 9.56°E	09:50	Unknown	Unknown
IFU	A waterspout made landfall; no damage was reported.						
IF0.5	Western Dolo	Veneto	Italy	53.79°N 7.90°E	10:20	2.3 km (1.4 mi)	600 m (660 yd)
IF0.5	A large but weak tornado impacted the western portions of Dolo, causing light damage to roofs and vegetation including crops and trees.						
IF0	E of Strøby	Zealand	Denmark	55.3831°N 12.3167°E	11:10	Unknown	Unknown
IF0	A weak tornado damaged a farmstead.						
IF0	Ostrowo	Pomerania	Poland	54.82°N 18.25°E	13:30	Unknown	Unknown
IF0	A brief tornado snapped weak tree branches and damaged crops.						

=== 3 August event ===
List of confirmed tornadoes – Sunday, 3 August 2025
IF#	Location	Region	Country	Start coord.	Time (UTC)	Path length	Max. width
IF1	N of Tuapse	Krasnodar	Russia	44.14°N 39.03°E	12:30	Unknown	Unknown
IF1	A waterspout made landfall at a resort, lifting a boat through the air.						
IF1.5	Peschici	Apulia	Italy	41.91°N 16.00°E	17:00	Unknown	Unknown
IF1.5	This tornado damaged vegetation by flattening parts of forest and snapping or uprooting many trees, damaged cars and power lines, and lightly damaged a touristic village.						

=== 4 August event ===
List of confirmed tornadoes – Monday, 4 August 2025
IF#	Location	Region	Country	Start coord.	Time (UTC)	Path length	Max. width
IFU	Ortona	Abruzzo	Italy	42.36°N 14.41°E	09:58-10:08	Unknown	Unknown
IFU	A waterspout made landfall; no damage was reported.						

=== 5 August event ===
List of confirmed tornadoes – Tuesday, 5 August 2025
IF#	Location	Region	Country	Start coord.	Time (UTC)	Path length	Max. width
IFU	Bagnara Calabra	Calabria	Italy	38.27°N 15.77°E	10:30	Unknown	Unknown
IFU	A waterspout made landfall; no damage was reported.						
IFU	Lipari (1st tornado)	Sicily	Italy	38.41°N 14.94°E	16:15	Unknown	Unknown
IFU	A waterspout made landfall on the island of Vulcano; no damage was reported.						
IFU	Lipari (2nd tornado)	Sicily	Italy	38.40°N 14.95°E	16:18	Unknown	Unknown
IFU	Another waterspout made landfall on the island of Vulcano (Sicily); no damage was reported.						

=== 10 August event ===
List of confirmed tornadoes – Sunday, 10 August 2025
IF#	Location	Region	Country	Start coord.	Time (UTC)	Path length	Max. width
IFU	Kruopiai area	Šiauliai	Lithuania	56.25°N 23.05°E	13:00	Unknown	Unknown
IFU	A landspout tornado was recorded; no damage was reported.						
IF1.5	NNE of Lipowy Most	Podlaskie	Poland	53.21°N 23.54°E	13:10	8.44 km (5.24 mi)	970 m (1,060 yd)
IF1.5	A tornado caused significant forest damage.						
IF1.5	E of Leszczany	Podlaskie	Poland	53.19°N 23.74°E	13:14	5.5 km (3.4 mi)	260 m (280 yd)
IF1.5	Another tornado tracked through forests. Preliminary rating.						

=== 16 August event ===
List of confirmed tornadoes – Saturday, 16 August 2025
IF#	Location	Region	Country	Start coord.	Time (UTC)	Path length	Max. width
IF0.5	Mottola	Apulia	Italy	40.66°N 16.97°E	10:30	1 km (0.62 mi)	Unknown
IF0.5	A hybrid tornado damaged wineyards, weak trees, and a street sign in addition to lofting light objects.						
IF0.5	Modica	Sicily	Italy	36.83°N 14.75°E	10:30	3.7 km (2.3 mi)	80 m (87 yd)
IF0.5	An anticyclonic tornado caused some roof & tree damage						

=== 18 August event ===
List of confirmed tornadoes – Monday, 18 August 2025
IF#	Location	Region	Country	Start coord.	Time (UTC)	Path length	Max. width
IF1.5	Suksun	Perm	Russia	40.66°N 16.97°E	14:12	Unknown	Unknown
IF1.5	Over 100 buildings and many trees were damaged by this tornado, including several with their roofs torn completely off upper floors destroyed.						
IF?	N of Archit (1st tornado)	Perm	Russia	57.1099°N 57.6338°E	14:30	Unknown	Unknown
IF?	Tornado was reported in a forest, more info to come						

=== 20 August event ===
List of confirmed tornadoes – Wednesday, 20 August 2025
IF#	Location	Region	Country	Start coord.	Time (UTC)	Path length	Max. width
IF1	SE of Hälleviksstrand	Västra Götaland	Sweden	58.12°N 11.47°E	22:55	Unknown	Unknown
IF1	A waterspout caused some damage in a camping site after making landfall.						

=== 21 August event ===
List of confirmed tornadoes – Thursday, 21 August 2025
IF#	Location	Region	Country	Start coord.	Time (UTC)	Path length	Max. width
IF1	S of Gothenburg	Västra Götaland	Sweden	57.60°N 11.92°E	06:35	0.3 km (0.19 mi)	15 m (16 yd)
IF1	A waterspout made landfall at a port, loosening roof tiles and damaging the roofs and walls of a waste management facility.						
IFU	Aglientu	Sardinia	Italy	41.14°N 9.04°E	06:50	Unknown	Unknown
IFU	A waterspout made landfall; no damage was reported.						
IFU	Positano	Campania	Italy	40.63°N 14.48°E	09:22	Unknown	Unknown
IFU	A waterspout made landfall; no damage was reported.						
IFU	Cagnes-sur-Mer	Provence-Alpes-Côte d'Azur	France	43.6640°N 7.1460°E	15:15	Unknown	Unknown
IFU	A waterspout was observed and very likely moved onshore causing possible damage.						

=== 23 August event ===
List of confirmed tornadoes – Saturday, 23 August 2025
IF#	Location	Region	Country	Start coord.	Time (UTC)	Path length	Max. width
IF1.5	W of Falkenhagen	Brandenburg	Germany	53.3652°N 13.7583°E	13:10	4 km (2.5 mi)	140 m (150 yd)
IF1.5	Numerous trees were snapped or uprooted and large tree branches were broken.						
IFU	Hiddensee to Ummanz	Mecklenburg-Vorpommern	Germany	54.56°N 13.10°E	13:25	Unknown	Unknown
IFU	A waterspout made landfall on multiple islands, breaking off tree branches.						
IFU	Solnechnoye	Saint Petersburg	Russia	60.14°N 29.92°E	17:00	Unknown	Unknown
IFU	A waterspout made landfall; no damage was reported.						

=== 24 August event ===
List of confirmed tornadoes – Sunday, 24 August 2025
IF#	Location	Region	Country	Start coord.	Time (UTC)	Path length	Max. width
IFU	N of Siilinjärvi	North Savo	Finland	63.072°N 27.601°E	08:50	8.6 km (5.3 mi)	470 m (510 yd)
IFU	A tornado was observed in the area doing no visible damage. It is unclear whether it was a waterspout or a landspout.						

=== 25 August event ===
List of confirmed tornadoes – Monday, 25 August 2025
IF#	Location	Region	Country	Start coord.	Time (UTC)	Path length	Max. width
IFU	Kambarka area	Udmurtia	Russia	56.26°N 54.19°E	14:30	Unknown	Unknown
IFU	A brief landspout tornado was observed; no damage was reported.						

=== 28 August event ===
List of confirmed tornadoes – Thursday, 28 August 2025
IF#	Location	Region	Country	Start coord.	Time (UTC)	Path length	Max. width
IF0.5	Somaglia	Lombardia	Italy	45.14°N 9.63°E	13:29	0.2 km (0.12 mi)	80 m (87 yd)
IF0.5	A brief rain-wrapped tornado caused light roof damage, snapped a tree and several branches, and moved light objects around.						

=== 29 August event ===
List of confirmed tornadoes – Friday, 29 August 2025
IF#	Location	Region	Country	Start coord.	Time (UTC)	Path length	Max. width
IF?	Bergerac	Nouvelle Aquitaine	France	44.85°N 0.45°E	10:43		
IF?	A tornado damaged a bakery. More info to come.						
IFU	Marçay	Centre-Val de Loire	France	47.10°N 0.21°E	11:30	Unknown	Unknown
IFU	A short and weak tornado was observed.						
IF1	Bias	Nouvelle-Aquitaine	France	44.41°N 0.66°E	11:36	2.2 km (1.4 mi)	150 m (160 yd)
IF1	At least eighteen roofs of homes or businesses and a farm were damaged.						
IFU	Śrem area	Greater Poland	Poland	52.07°N 16.99°E	11:47	Unknown	Unknown
IFU	A brief tornado was observed.						
IF1	Boisseuil to Saint-Hilaire-Bonneval	Nouvelle-Aquitaine	France	45.75°N 1.33°E	12:25	3.3 km (2.1 mi)	90 m (98 yd)
IF1	A possible tornado damaged homes and vegetation. Broken windows and fences, broken branches, and uprooted trees were reported, and light objects were tossed.						
IF1.5	Gniezno	Greater Poland	Poland	52.51°N 17.59°E	13:13	20.8 km (12.9 mi)	
IF1.5	A strong tornado overturned vehicles and damaged roofs and trees. One person was injured when a tree fell on a car. More info to come.						
IF?	Boisville-la-Saint-Père	Centre-Val de Loire	France	48.32°N 1.69°E	13:20		
IF?	Roofs and vegetation were damaged. More info to come.						
IF1	Verderio Superiore	Lombardia	Italy	45.66°N 9.43°E	14:00	2.8 km (1.7 mi)	100 m (110 yd)
IF1	Roof tiles blown off, trees were uprooted or snapped, street signs were damaged & light objects tossed 10s of metres.						
IF0.5	Goito	Lombardia	Italy	45.25°N 10.66°E	14:45	2 km (1.2 mi)	
IF0.5	A cemetery sustained damage, trees and branches were downed, and powerlines were damaged by falling trees.						
IF1.5	Saint-Rabier	Nouvelle-Aquitaine	France	45.15°N 1.16°E	15:12	6.4 km (4.0 mi)	100 m (110 yd)
IF1.5	A tornado damaged around 40 homes, broke tree branches, and tossed a trampoline. One mobile home was overturned, injuring one person.						
IF1.5	N of Martel	Occitania	France	44.94°N 1.64°E	16:40	7.3 km (4.5 mi)	150 m (160 yd)
IF1.5	Several trees were snapped or uprooted and numerous large tree branches were broken.						
IF1	La Chapelle-sur-Aveyron	Centre-Val de Loire	France	47.86°N 2.87°E	18:00		
IF1	A tornado was observed making ground contact, later causing minor roof damage to several homes.						

== September ==
IFU	IF0	IF0.5	IF1	IF1.5	IF2	IF2.5	IF3	IF4	IF5	Total
20	3	6	3	4	1	0	0	0	0	38

- Note: One tornado has been confirmed but has not been rated yet.

=== 1 September event ===
List of confirmed tornadoes – Monday, 1 September 2025
IF#	Location	Region	Country	Start coord.	Time (UTC)	Path length	Max. width
IFU	SW of Mykolaiv	Mykolaiv	Ukraine	46.8466°N 31.7943°E	12:15	Unknown	Unknown
IFU	A possible landspout tornado was observed.						
IF1	NNW of Lonigo	Veneto	Italy	45.3975°N 11.3448°E	19:53	0.4 km (0.25 mi)	Unknown
IF1	Trees were downed in opposite directions and roof materials were strewn in a field by this tornado.						
IF1.5	NE of Lonigo	Veneto	Italy	45.3951°N 11.3699°E	19:55	1.6 km (0.99 mi)	300 m (330 yd)
IF1.5	Trees, fences, and signs were downed in a convergent pattern and roofs were damaged.						

=== 2 September event ===
List of confirmed tornadoes – Tuesday, 2 September 2025
IF#	Location	Region	Country	Start coord.	Time (UTC)	Path length	Max. width
IFU	Follonica	Tuscany	Italy	42.9019°N 10.7810°E	05:07	Unknown	Unknown
IFU	A waterspout made landfall, causing no reported damage.						
IF1	Landévant	Brittany	France	47.7814°N 3.1081°W	05:50	1.9 km (1.2 mi)	300 m (330 yd)
IF1	Several trees were snapped or uprooted, with large branches downed. An outdoor furniture, roofs and gates were also damaged.						
IF2	Guéhenno	Brittany	France	47.9002°N 2.6520°W	06:22	19.7 km (12.2 mi)	650 m (710 yd)
IF2	This strong, multi-vortex tornado struck several communes, injuring four people and damaging about ten homes. One house had a piece of wood driven into the wall just behind a bed, and two people in a mobile home were thrown roughly 150 m (160 yd) into a nearby field.						

=== 3 September event ===
List of confirmed tornadoes – Wednesday, 3 September 2025
IF#	Location	Region	Country	Start coord.	Time (UTC)	Path length	Max. width
IF1.5	Southern Bocholt	North Rhine-Westphalia	Germany	51.8150°N 6.6100°E	19:40	1.7 km (1.1 mi)	30 m (33 yd)
IF1.5	This tornado began with vegetation damage over fields before moving into more urban areas, where several roofs had their tiles removed.						

=== 4 September event ===
List of confirmed tornadoes – Thursday, 4 September 2025
IF#	Location	Region	Country	Start coord.	Time (UTC)	Path length	Max. width
IFU	Newark on Trent area	Nottinghamshire	United Kingdom	53.0752°N 0.8067°W	11:40	Unknown	Unknown
IFU	A tornado was observed. No damage was reported.						

=== 5 September event ===
List of confirmed tornadoes – Friday, 5 September 2025
IF#	Location	Region	Country	Start coord.	Time (UTC)	Path length	Max. width
IF0	Drusenheim	Grand Est	France	48.7544°N 7.9558°E	13:05	Unknown	Unknown
IF0	Tree branches were snapped, tarps were torn off, and a gazebo was damaged by a brief tornado.						

=== 6 September event ===
List of confirmed tornadoes – Saturday, 6 September 2025
IF#	Location	Region	Country	Start coord.	Time (UTC)	Path length	Max. width
IFU	SW of Tomislavgrad	Canton 10	Bosnia	43.67°N 17.14°E	14:00	Unknown	Unknown
IFU	Reportedly over land, no known damages.						

=== 8 September event ===
List of confirmed tornadoes – Monday, 8 September 2025
IF#	Location	Region	Country	Start coord.	Time (UTC)	Path length	Max. width
IFU	NE of Marklowice	Silesia	Poland	50.0319°N 18.5461°E	15:24	Unknown	Unknown
IFU	A tornado was observed; no damage was reported.						

=== 10 September event ===
List of confirmed tornadoes – Wednesday, 10 September 2025
IF#	Location	Region	Country	Start coord.	Time (UTC)	Path length	Max. width
IFU	Fondi	Lazio	Italy	41.2951°N 13.3151°E	08:50	Unknown	Unknown
IFU	A waterspout caused damage at two beaching facilities.						

=== 11 September event ===
List of confirmed tornadoes – Thursday, 11 September 2025
IF#	Location	Region	Country	Start coord.	Time (UTC)	Path length	Max. width
IF0	Torre San Giovanni	Apulia	Italy	39.8779°N 18.1307°E	02:25	Unknown	Unknown
IF0	A waterspout made landfall, overturning and tossing beach chairs.						

=== 13 September event ===
List of confirmed tornadoes – Saturday, 13 September 2025
IF#	Location	Region	Country	Start coord.	Time (UTC)	Path length	Max. width
IFU	Ostiglia area	Lombardy	Italy	45.0832°N 11.1008°E	12:50	Unknown	Unknown
IFU	A landspout tornado lofted dust in a field.						
IFU	Varazze	Liguria	Italy	44.3546°N 8.5697°E	13:43-14:05	Unknown	Unknown
IFU	A waterspout made landfall in a port; no damage was reported.						
IF0	Skalica	Trnava	Slovakia	48.8560°N 17.1732°E	16:55	Unknown	Unknown
IF0	A weak tornado caused no damage.						

=== 14 September event ===
List of confirmed tornadoes – Sunday, 14 September 2025
IF#	Location	Region	Country	Start coord.	Time (UTC)	Path length	Max. width
IF1.5	Karlskrona	Blekinge	Sweden	56.16°N 15.58°E	14:25	Unknown	Unknown
IF1.5	This tornado struck Karlskrona, damaging numerous trees and the roofs of several buildings, some of which were destroyed.						

=== 15 September event ===
List of confirmed tornadoes – Monday, 15 September 2025
IF#	Location	Region	Country	Start coord.	Time (UTC)	Path length	Max. width
IF1	Alvesta	Kronoberg	Sweden	56.8953°N 14.5446°E	15:03	Unknown	Unknown
IF1	Trees were downed and the roofs of many buildings were damaged, including that of an auto repair shop where the tornado was captured on video. More info to come.						

=== 21 September event ===
List of confirmed tornadoes – Sunday, 21 September 2025
IF#	Location	Region	Country	Start coord.	Time (UTC)	Path length	Max. width
IF?	Lattes to Baillargues	Occitania	France	43.5862°N 3.9058°E	10:47	~16 km (9.9 mi)	100 m (110 yd)
IF?	An EF0 tornado damaged trees, overturned heavy pots and a park bench, and damaged tents, fences, and temporary toilets at a festival site. More info to come.						

=== 22 September event ===
List of confirmed tornadoes – Monday, 22 September 2025
IF#	Location	Region	Country	Start coord.	Time (UTC)	Path length	Max. width
IFU	Riva Trigoso	Liguria	Italy	44.2599°N 9.4155°E	07:12-07:23	Unknown	Unknown
IFU	A waterspout made landfall, causing no known damage.						
IF0.5	Forte dei Marmi	Tuscany	Italy	43.9483°N 10.1767°E	09:40	Unknown	Unknown
IF0.5	Light objects and boats were tossed and damaged by a landfalling waterspout.						
IF0.5	Marina di Pietrasanta	Tuscany	Italy	43.9139°N 10.2092°E	09:50	Unknown	Unknown
IF0.5	Another waterspout lofted light objects from a beach and caused minor roof damage.						
IFU	Viareggio (1st tornado)	Tuscany	Italy	43.8535°N 10.2415°E	09:55	Unknown	Unknown
IFU	A waterspout lofted light objects at a beach.						
IF0.5	Viareggio (2nd tornado)	Tuscany	Italy	43.8876°N 10.2288°E	10:00	Unknown	Unknown
IF0.5	Another waterspout lofted and rolled small objects and a boat at a beach, additionally ripping off a sheet metal roof.						
IF0.5	Cecina	Tuscany	Italy	43.3083°N 10.4809°E	10:40	Unknown	Unknown
IF0.5	A waterspout made landfall, causing damage to a roof before dissipating.						
IFU	Ladispoli	Lazio	Italy	41.9435°N 12.0825°E	13:17	Unknown	Unknown
IFU	Tarps were lofted and a boat was overturned.						
IFU	W of Fordongianus	Sardinia	Italy	39.9911°N 8.7788°E	16:00	Unknown	Unknown
IFU	A tornado was photographed. No known damage occurred.						
IFU	Castiglione della Pescaia	Tuscany	Italy	42.7590°N 10.9106°E	16:17	Unknown	Unknown
IFU	A waterspout made landfall, causing no known damage.						

=== 23 September event ===
List of confirmed tornadoes – Tuesday, 23 September 2025
IF#	Location	Region	Country	Start coord.	Time (UTC)	Path length	Max. width
IFU	Cagliari	Sardinia	Italy	39.2211°N 9.1891°E	10:15	Unknown	Unknown
IFU	A waterspout made landfall on Poetto beach, causing no known damage.						

=== 24 September event ===
List of confirmed tornadoes – Wednesday, 24 September 2025
IF#	Location	Region	Country	Start coord.	Time (UTC)	Path length	Max. width
IFU	E Ostellato	Emilia-Romagna	Italy	44.7433°N 12.0215°E	14:50	Unknown	Unknown
IFU	A tornado lofted dust over open fields.						
IFU	Lumbarda	Dubrovnik-Neretva	Croatia	42.9107°N 17.1637°E	16:05	Unknown	Unknown
IFU	A waterspout made landfall. No damage was reported.						

=== 27 September event ===
List of confirmed tornadoes – Saturday, 27 September 2025
IF#	Location	Region	Country	Start coord.	Time (UTC)	Path length	Max. width
IF0.5	Genoa	Liguria	Italy	44.3919°N 8.9585°E	02:10	Unknown	Unknown
IF0.5	A waterspout made landfall, ripping off some sheet metal.						

=== 28 September event ===
List of confirmed tornadoes – Sunday, 28 September 2025
IF#	Location	Region	Country	Start coord.	Time (UTC)	Path length	Max. width
IFU	W of Veglie (1st tornado)	Apulia	Italy	40.3413°N 17.8998°E	10:29-10:38	Unknown	Unknown
IFU	A landspout tornado was observed; no damage was reported.						
IFU	W of Veglie (2nd tornado)	Apulia	Italy	40.3368°N 17.9064°E	10:47-10:59	Unknown	Unknown
IFU	A second, anticyclonic landspout was observed; no damage was reported.						

=== 29 September event ===
List of confirmed tornadoes – Monday, 29 September 2025
IF#	Location	Region	Country	Start coord.	Time (UTC)	Path length	Max. width
IF0.5	Tympaki	Crete	Greece	35.0705°N 24.7531°E	04:05	Unknown	Unknown
IF0.5	A tornado, possibly originating as a waterspout, damaged greenhouses.						

== October ==
IFU	IF0	IF0.5	IF1	IF1.5	IF2	IF2.5	IF3	IF4	IF5	Total
4	1	6	5	8	5	0	0	0	0	29

=== 1 October event ===
List of confirmed tornadoes – Wednesday, 1 October 2025
IF#	Location	Region	Country	Start coord.	Time (UTC)	Path length	Max. width
IF0.5	W of Trani	Apulia	Italy	41.2872°N 16.3920°E	13:57	0.6 km (0.37 mi)	60 m (66 yd)
IF0.5	A waterspout lightly damaged roofs and lofted sheet metal and trash cans.						
IFU	Policoro area	Basilicata	Italy	40.2121°N 16.7056°E	14:50	Unknown	Unknown
IFU	A probable landspout tornado caused no reported damage.						
IF0.5	Southern Milazzo	Sicily	Italy	38.2066°N 15.2345°E	23:28	1.2 km (0.75 mi)	Unknown
IF0.5	Sheet metal from a roof and a trampoline were thrown hundreds of meters, and fences and roofs were lightly damaged by this waterspout that moved ashore.						

=== 2 October event ===
List of confirmed tornadoes – Thursday, 2 October 2025
IF#	Location	Region	Country	Start coord.	Time (UTC)	Path length	Max. width
IFU	Barletta	Apulia	Italy	41.3210°N 16.2924°E	17:05	Unknown	Unknown
IFU	A waterspout made landfall. No damage could be confirmed.						

=== 4 October event ===
List of confirmed tornadoes – Saturday, 4 October 2025
IF#	Location	Region	Country	Start coord.	Time (UTC)	Path length	Max. width
IF2	Oppdal area	Trøndelag	Norway	62.5939°N 9.6805°E	09:00		
IF2	A damaging landspout tracked through a downtown area. Three people were slightly injured. More info to come.						

=== 9 October event ===
List of confirmed tornadoes – Thursday, 9 October 2025
IF#	Location	Region	Country	Start coord.	Time (UTC)	Path length	Max. width
IF1.5	W of Sälen	Dalarna	Sweden	61.1560°N 12.7491°E	15:25	>1.5 km (0.93 mi)	Unknown
IF1.5	Over ten thousand trees were downed in heavily forested land. It is possible this tornado began in Norway.						

=== 20 October event ===
List of confirmed tornadoes – Monday, 20 October 2025
IF#	Location	Region	Country	Start coord.	Time (UTC)	Path length	Max. width
IF0.5	Dereham	Norfolk	United Kingdom	52.6802°N 0.9386°E	13:30	Unknown	Unknown
IF0.5	A weak tornado moved through Dereham causing minor damage to homes and injuring one person.						
IF1.5	E of Boekhoute	East Flanders	Belgium	51.2500°N 3.7560°E	14:56	Unknown	Unknown
IF1.5	A tornado caused damage in Assenede. A firefighter sustained injuries. More info to come.						
IF1	Anglesqueville-la-Bras-Long to SW of Bourville	Normandy	France	49.7810°N 0.7822°E	15:18	2.5 km (1.6 mi)	100 m (110 yd)
IF1	This tornado caused mostly minor damage, including uprooted fruit trees, snapped branches, a severed oak tree, destroyed garden furniture and small structures, a small chalet blown away, and roof tiles displaced from nearby buildings. KERAUNOS rated this tornado EF0.						
IF1	N of Michery	Bourgogne-Franche-Comté	France	48.3196°N 3.2239°E	15:25	Unknown	Unknown
IF1	A brief tornado was filmed and a few small tree branches were snapped. KERAUNOS rated this tornado EF0.						
IF0.5	Reilly to Chaumont-en-Vexin to Le Mesnil-Théribus	Hauts-de-France	France	49.2658°N 1.8619°E	15:40	13.2 km (8.2 mi)	150 m (160 yd)
IF0.5	This tornado moved through the eastern side of Chaumont-en-Vexin, damaging several roofs and downing trees and tree branches. KERAUNOS rated this tornado EF0.						
IF2	Achères to Ermont to Saint-Prix to Fontenay-en-Parisis	Île-de-France	France	48.9918°N 2.2586°E	15:48–16:09	21 km (13 mi)	600 m (660 yd)
IF2	1 death – A strong, deadly tornado struck several suburbs northwest of Paris, including Ermont, Argenteuil, Eaubonne, Saint-Prix, Andilly, Montmorency, and Franconville. Three tower cranes collapsed, multiple roofs were torn off, and debris such as tiles and other objects blocked streets. Several vehicles were damaged or overturned. At least nine people were injured. More info to come. KERAUNOS rated this tornado EF2.						
IF0.5	SW of Teroele	Friesland	Netherlands	52.9294°N 5.6779°E	17:15	Unknown	Unknown
IF0.5	This tornado damaged the roof of a barn and snapped some branches off of a weeping willow tree.						
IF1	E of Chambley-Bussières to SSE of Rezonville-Vionville	Grand Est	France	49.0504°N 5.9189°E	20:30	7.2 km (4.5 mi)	80 m (87 yd)
IF1	This tornado uprooted, topped, and cut numerous trees with debris scattered over long distances, damaged several properties by tearing off roofing materials and fences, blew away a small shelter, and lofted sheet metal up to 800 m (870 yd) from its point of origin. KERAUNOS rated this tornado EF1.						

=== 21 October event ===
List of confirmed tornadoes – Tuesday, 21 October 2025
IF#	Location	Region	Country	Start coord.	Time (UTC)	Path length	Max. width
IF0.5	Butera	Sicily	Italy	37.1193°N 14.0647°E	13:05	3 km (1.9 mi)	30 m (33 yd)
IF0.5	A waterspout moved ashore, lofting greenhouse sheets.						

=== 23 October event ===
List of confirmed tornadoes – Thursday, 23 October 2025
IF#	Location	Region	Country	Start coord.	Time (UTC)	Path length	Max. width
IF1.5	NW of Seibersbach	Rhineland-Palatinate	Germany	49.0177°N 9.4682°E	07:47	1.5 km (0.93 mi)	220 m (240 yd)
IF1.5	A tornado caused damage near Seibersbach. More info to come.						
IFU	S of Camogli	Liguria	Italy	44.3431°N 9.1565°E	12:50	Unknown	Unknown
IFU	This waterspout moved inland and caused no damage.						

=== 27 October event ===
List of confirmed tornadoes – Monday, 27 October 2025
IF#	Location	Region	Country	Start coord.	Time (UTC)	Path length	Max. width
IF1	Enez	Edirne	Turkey	40.7249°N 26.0847°E	13:25	Unknown	Unknown
IF1	This tornado struck Enez and damaged the roof of at least two houses and also damaged power poles.						

=== 28 October event ===
List of confirmed tornadoes – Tuesday, 28 October 2025
IF#	Location	Region	Country	Start coord.	Time (UTC)	Path length	Max. width
IF1.5	S of Chipiona	Andalusia	Spain	36.6743°N 6.4063°W	03:45	Unknown	Unknown
IF1.5	A waterspout made landfall, snapping trees, damaging roofs and collapsing some free standing walls.						
IF0	Alvor	Faro	Portugal	37.1211°N 8.5879°W	13:00	Unknown	Unknown
IF0	A very weak waterspout made landfall on the beach in Alvor, passing over outdoor furniture but without shifting the furniture.						

=== 29 October event ===
List of confirmed tornadoes – Wednesday, 29 October 2025
IF#	Location	Region	Country	Start coord.	Time (UTC)	Path length	Max. width
IF1	Isla Cristina area	Andalusia	Spain	37.2010°N 7.3249°W	08:05	Unknown	Unknown
IF1	A tornado damaged trees and roofs.						
IF2	Gibraleón	Andalusia	Spain	37.3746°N 6.9691°W	08:25	2.5 km (1.5 mi)	Unknown
IF2	1 death – A strong tornado struck Gibraleón, damaging trees and roofs of buildings in town. A falling structure severely injured a man who eventually passed away two days after.						

== November ==
IFU	IF0	IF0.5	IF1	IF1.5	IF2	IF2.5	IF3	IF4	IF5	Total
9	2	11	4	3	2	0	0	0	0	31

=== 1 November event ===
List of confirmed tornadoes – Saturday, 1 November 2025
IF#	Location	Region	Country	Start coord.	Time (UTC)	Path length	Max. width
IF0.5	Milford on Sea	Hampshire	United Kingdom	50.7205°N 1.5874°W	00:15	0.8 km (0.50 mi)	50 m (55 yd)
IF0.5	This tornado caused minor damage to several properties, mainly removing small numbers of roof tiles and toppling weak single-skin brick walls that had fencing or vegetation attached to them.						

=== 3 November event ===
List of confirmed tornadoes – Monday, 3 November 2025
IF#	Location	Region	Country	Start coord.	Time (UTC)	Path length	Max. width
IFU	Vietri sul Mare	Campania	Italy	40.6675°N 14.7282°E	10:15	Unknown	Unknown
IFU	A waterspout made landfall in Vietri sul Mare and caused no damage.						

=== 6 November event ===
List of confirmed tornadoes – Thursday, 6 November 2025
IF#	Location	Region	Country	Start coord.	Time (UTC)	Path length	Max. width
IF1.5	Western Palma de Mallorca	Balearic Islands	Spain	39.563°N 2.611°E	08:00	0.5 km (0.31 mi)	Unknown
IF1.5	Numerous trees were snapped or downed in a forest in western Palma.						

=== 7 November event ===
List of confirmed tornadoes – Friday, 7 November 2025
IF#	Location	Region	Country	Start coord.	Time (UTC)	Path length	Max. width
IF0.5	S of San Nicolò d'Arcidano	Sardinia	Italy	39.6575°N 8.6566°E	09:05	0.5 km (0.31 mi)	95 m (104 yd)
IF0.5	A tornado tracked through greenhouses, damaging the structural integrity of a few weak ones.						

=== 10 November event ===
List of confirmed tornadoes – Monday, 10 November 2025
IF#	Location	Region	Country	Start coord.	Time (UTC)	Path length	Max. width
IF0.5	Patras	Western Greece	Greece	38.2465°N 21.7348°E	12:30	Unknown	Unknown
IF0.5	A brief tornado damaged a few trees, cars and buildings.						

=== 15 November event ===
List of confirmed tornadoes – Saturday, 15 November 2025
IF#	Location	Region	Country	Start coord.	Time (UTC)	Path length	Max. width
IF2	Albufeira	Faro	Portugal	37.1061°N 8.2541°W	10:06	Unknown	Unknown
IF2	1 death – This strong tornado began over water before moving ashore, striking a campsite in Albufeira. Mobile homes were completely destroyed and numerous trees were snapped or uprooted. Twenty-eight people were also injured.						
IF2	Lagoa	Faro	Portugal	37.1119°N 8.5079°W	11:20	Unknown	Unknown
IF2	This waterspout made landfall and became a strong tornado that tore through Lagoa and caused significant damage to trees and trailers. Major debranching occurred to several trees.						
IFU	Genoa (1st tornado)	Liguria	Italy	44.4260°N 8.7390°E	12:10	Unknown	Unknown
IFU	A waterspout made landfall in western Genoa causing no known damage.						
IF1	Genoa (2nd tornado)	Liguria	Italy	44.4236°N 8.7875°E	12:50	1.9 km (1.2 mi)	Unknown
IF1	A tornado overturned multiple containers in the Pra' neighborhood.						
IF1.5	Genoa (3rd tornado)	Liguria	Italy	44.4247°N 8.8138°E	13:00	1 km (0.62 mi)	100 m (110 yd)
IF1.5	This tornado downed trees and tree branches, damaged windows and roofs of buildings, moved a small boat, lofted light objects and blew a truck onto its side.						
IF0.5	Genoa (4th tornado)	Liguria	Italy	44.4268°N 8.8361°E	13:05	1.3 km (0.81 mi)	160 m (170 yd)
IF0.5	A waterspout made landfall and moved through the Sestri Ponente area. Minor damage occurred to roofs, light objects were moved around, a tent was ripped and a singular tree branch was downed.						
IF0	Genoa (5th tornado)	Liguria	Italy	44.3932°N 8.9567°E	13:15	1.2 km (0.75 mi)	160 m (170 yd)
IF0	This weak tornado affected the Albaro neighborhood where some small motorbikes, potted plants and a sign were tossed around. A tree branch was also downed.						
IF0.5	Genoa (6th tornado)	Liguria	Italy	44.3944°N 8.9948°E	13:26–13:32	Unknown	Unknown
IF0.5	A tornado tossed light objects around, blew down a tree and damaged a roof in the Quarto dei Mille neighborhood.						
IFU	Bogliasco	Liguria	Italy	44.3762°N 9.0777°E	15:43	Unknown	Unknown
IFU	A waterspout made landfall and caused no damage.						

=== 18 November event ===
List of confirmed tornadoes – Tuesday, 18 November 2025
IF#	Location	Region	Country	Start coord.	Time (UTC)	Path length	Max. width
IF0.5	Eastern Marina di Casalvelino (1st tornado)	Campania	Italy	40.1736°N 15.1366°E	12:00	3.1 km (1.9 mi)	Unknown
IF0.5	This waterspout moved ashore and downed a tree and a tree branch. Some sheet metal was also ripped off of roofs.						
IFU	Eastern Marina di Casalvelino (2nd tornado)	Campania	Italy	40.1658°N 15.1415°E	12:00	Unknown	Unknown
IFU	A waterspout made landfall and caused no damage.						

=== 20 November event ===
List of confirmed tornadoes – Thursday, 20 November 2025
IF#	Location	Region	Country	Start coord.	Time (UTC)	Path length	Max. width
IFU	Western Terracina	Lazio	Italy	41.2733°N 13.1543°E	12:30	Unknown	Unknown
IFU	A waterspout made landfall and caused no damage.						

=== 21 November event ===
List of confirmed tornadoes – Friday, 21 November 2025
IF#	Location	Region	Country	Start coord.	Time (UTC)	Path length	Max. width
IF0.5	W of Lefkimmi	Ionian Islands	Greece	39.4233°N 20.0387°E	00:30	Unknown	Unknown
IF0.5	This tornado damaged large tree branches, roofs of buildings and power poles.						
IF0.5	S of Ravenna	Emilia-Romagna	Italy	44.3577°N 12.2065°E	15:15	0.7 km (0.43 mi)	Unknown
IF0.5	Outdoor furniture was tossed around, some of which traveled considerable distances.						

=== 24 November event ===
List of confirmed tornadoes – Monday, 24 November 2025
IF#	Location	Region	Country	Start coord.	Time (UTC)	Path length	Max. width
IF1	Illingen	Saarland	Germany	49.3678°N 7.0418°E	14:45	1.1 km (0.68 mi)	30 m (33 yd)
IF1	A brief tornado first became evident near a community school and then tracked through nearby residential neighborhoods, damaging property as it moved from yard to yard. A greenhouse lost multiple panels, two beehives were destroyed, sheds had roofing torn off and tossed into neighboring lots, and a material tent was carried roughly 200 m (220 yd), striking and bending a street lamp along the way. Farther along the path, loose outdoor items including a heavy beach chair were lofted and thrown into homes, causing roof, gable, and shelter damage, with one house partially losing sections of its roof before the tornado dissipated.						

=== 26 November event ===
List of confirmed tornadoes – Wednesday, 26 November 2025
IF#	Location	Region	Country	Start coord.	Time (UTC)	Path length	Max. width
IF0.5	Parapotamos	Epirus	Greece	39.5477°N 20.3243°E	07:30	Unknown	Unknown
IF0.5	This tornado caused damage to the metal sheets at a factory and several trees.						
IFU	Mathraki	Ionian Islands	Greece	39.7639°N 19.5179°E	08:00	Unknown	Unknown
IFU	A waterspout came ashore, causing no damage.						

=== 27 November event ===
List of confirmed tornadoes – Thursday, 27 November 2025
IF#	Location	Region	Country	Start coord.	Time (UTC)	Path length	Max. width
IF1.5	Foinikounta	Peloponnese	Greece	36.808°N 21.8064°E	04:50-5:05	Unknown	Unknown
IF1.5	This tornado damaged roofs, partially collapsed walls, lifted cars, broke large branches off of trees, damaged crops, and damaged greenhouses.						

=== 30 November event ===
List of confirmed tornadoes – Sunday, 30 November 2025
IF#	Location	Region	Country	Start coord.	Time (UTC)	Path length	Max. width
IFU	Genoa	Liguria	Italy	44.4179°N 8.7959°E	14:05	Unknown	Unknown
IFU	A waterspout made landfall in Genoa causing no reported damage.						

== December ==
IFU	IF0	IF0.5	IF1	IF1.5	IF2	IF2.5	IF3	IF4	IF5	Total
5	0	3	4	2	0	0	0	0	0	14

=== 2 December event ===
List of confirmed tornadoes – Tuesday, 2 December 2025
IF#	Location	Region	Country	Start coord.	Time (UTC)	Path length	Max. width
IF1	Manduria	Apulia	Italy	40.3477°N 17.6471°E	14:23	6.7 km (4.2 mi)	90 m (98 yd)
IF1	A tornado touched down in Manduria and uprooted trees.						

=== 5 December event ===
List of confirmed tornadoes – Friday, 5 December 2025
IF#	Location	Region	Country	Start coord.	Time (UTC)	Path length	Max. width
IF1	SE of Charakas	Crete	Greece	34.9848°N 25.2857°E	00:15	Unknown	100 m (110 yd)
IF1	This tornado struck Tsoutsouras, damaging several structures and trees.						
IF1.5	S of Palaikastro	Crete	Greece	35.1304°N 26.2509°E	07:00	Unknown	Unknown
IF1.5	A tornado affected the settlement of Azokeramos, damaging over one thousand olive trees.						

=== 6 December event ===
List of confirmed tornadoes – Saturday, 6 December 2025
IF#	Location	Region	Country	Start coord.	Time (UTC)	Path length	Max. width
IF1	Seaford	East Sussex	United Kingdom	50.7753°N 0.0868°E	01:35	1.3 km (0.81 mi)	45 m (49 yd)
IF1	A waterspout came ashore and caused mostly minor, scattered damage along its short path. Most affected homes lost only a small portion of roof tiles, but roughly 40 properties sustained some level of impact. The most significant damage occurred when detached garage roofs were lifted and thrown onto nearby houses, in one case breaking brickwork along a gable wall. At least three homes were left temporarily uninhabitable due to roof damage and subsequent water intrusion.						

=== 15 December event ===
List of confirmed tornadoes – Monday, 15 December 2025
IF#	Location	Region	Country	Start coord.	Time (UTC)	Path length	Max. width
IF1	Rota	Andalusia	Spain	36.6198°N 6.3599°W	16:05	Unknown	Unknown
IF1	A waterspout made landfall in Rota, lifting and tossing metal roofing.						

=== 23 December event ===
List of confirmed tornadoes – Tuesday, 23 December 2025
IF#	Location	Region	Country	Start coord.	Time (UTC)	Path length	Max. width
IFU	Messina	Sicily	Italy	38.1829°N 15.5615°E	15:25	Unknown	Unknown
IFU	A waterspout moved ashore and quickly dissipated, causing no damage.						
IFU	SE of Saline Joniche	Calabria	Italy	37.9379°N 15.7193°E	15:45	Unknown	Unknown
IFU	This waterspout briefly moved ashore and lofted light debris.						

=== 24 December event ===
List of confirmed tornadoes – Wednesday, 24 December 2025
IF#	Location	Region	Country	Start coord.	Time (UTC)	Path length	Max. width
IFU	SSW of Vietri sul Mare	Campania	Italy	40.6645°N 14.7122°E	11:15	Unknown	Unknown
IFU	An anticyclonic waterspout made landfall and caused no damage.						

=== 28 December event ===
List of confirmed tornadoes – Sunday, 28 December 2025
IF#	Location	Region	Country	Start coord.	Time (UTC)	Path length	Max. width
IF0.5	SE of Mazarrón	Murcia	Spain	37.5642°N 1.2565°W	16:25	Unknown	Unknown
IF0.5	A waterspout made landfall and struck Puerto de Mazarrón, lifting boat covers and inflicting minor damage to roofs.						

== See also ==
- Tornadoes of 2025
- Weather of 2025
  - 2024-25 European windstorm season
- List of European tornadoes and tornado outbreaks
