= Luhavaya Slabada rural council =

Lower-level subdivision of Minsk, Belarus

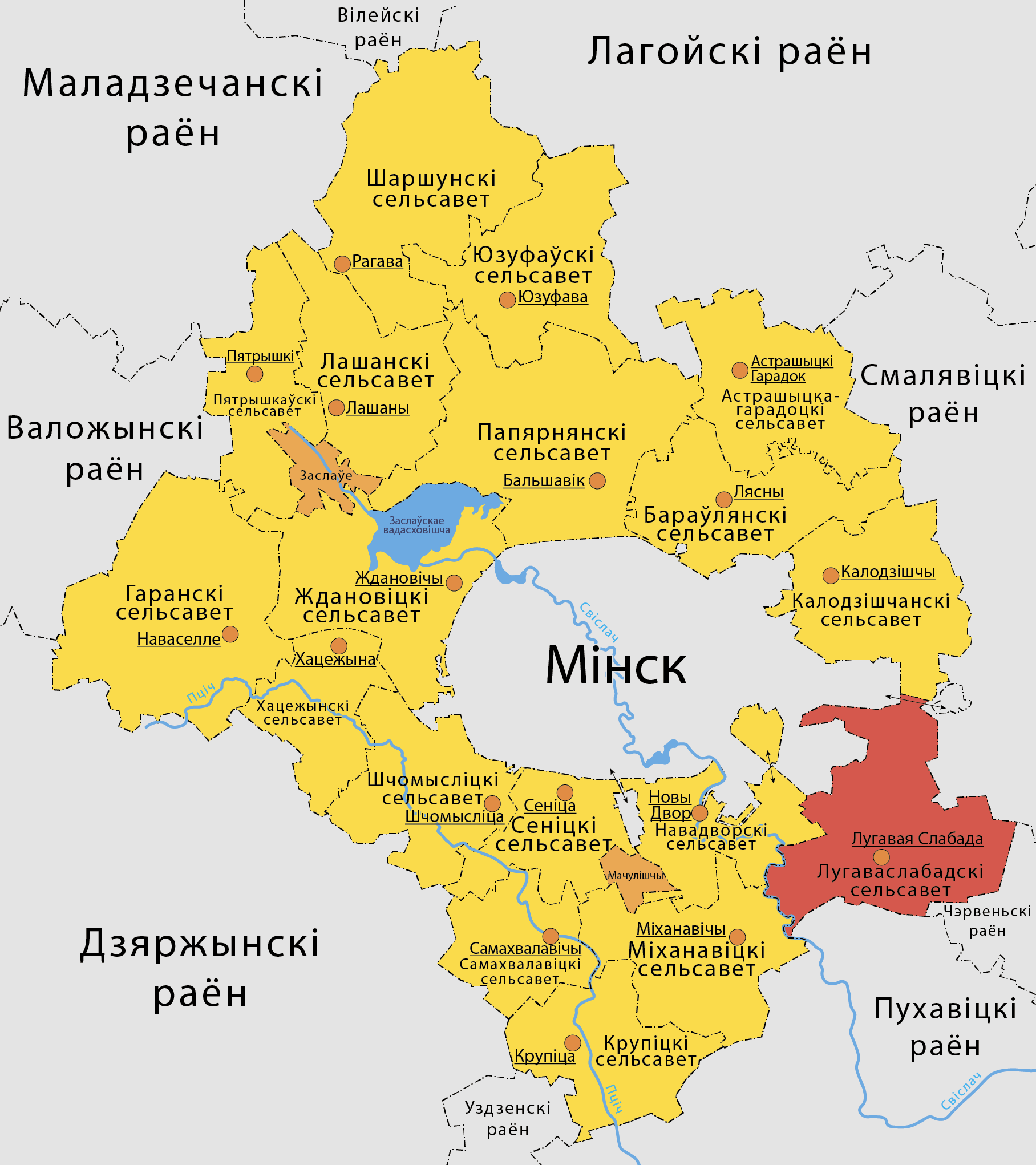
Map of Minsk District

Luhavaya Slabada rural council (Belarusian: Лугаваслабадскі сельсавет; Russian: Луговослободской сельсовет) is a lower-level subdivision (selsoviet) of Minsk district, Minsk region, Belarus. Its administrative center is the agrotown of Luhavaya Slabada.

== Rural localities ==
The populations are from the 2009 Belarusian census (7,188 total) and 2019 Belarusian census (8,874 total)

Russian name	Belarusian name	Pop. 2009	Pop. 2019
д Весёлки	в Вясёлкі	3	28
д Гузгаловка	в Гузгалаўка	161	188
д Даниловка	в Данілаўка	23	56
д Дворец	в Дварэц	31	31
д Дуброво	в Дуброва	39	26
д Ефимово	в Яўхімова	94	172
д Заболотье	в Забалацце	232	212
аг Замосточье	аг Замасточча	2310	2672
д Заречье	в Зарэчча	80	166
д Застаринье	в Застарынне	5	3
д Заямочное	в Заямачнае	134	142
д Ксаверово	в Ксавярова	20	28
д Лебединец	в Лебядзінец	32	48
аг Луговая Слобода	аг Лугавая Слабада	1352	1447
д Обчак	в Абчак	317	554
п Привольный	п Прывольны	1961	2363
д Прилесье	в Прылессе	232	517
д Синило	в Сініло	162	221
