= Nizma =

Nizma Низьма
- Village
- Location within Vologda Oblast Location within Russia
- Coordinates: 59°11′N 40°16′E
- Country: Russia
- Region: Vologda Oblast
- District: Vologodsky District
- Time zone: UTC+3:00

Nizma (Russian: Низьма) is a rural locality (a village) in Markovskoye Rural Settlement, Vologodsky District, Vologda Oblast, Russia. The population was 7 as of 2002.

== Geography ==
Nizma is located 31 km east of Vologda (the district's administrative centre) by road. Lobkovo is the nearest rural locality.
