= Keraunos =

French meteorological organization

- Observatoire Français des Tornades et des Orages Violents
- Named after: Κεραυνός (Greek word for thunderbolt)
- Established: 2006 (19 years ago)
- Founders: Pierre Mahieu, Emmanuel Wesolek
- Legal status: société par actions simplifiée
- Focus: Meteorology
- Headquarters: Wattignies
- Country: France
- Official Languages: French language
- Website: keraunos.org

Keraunos, (sometimes written as KERAUNOS, in all caps) or the Tornadoes and Severe Storms French Observatory, is a French meteorological organization specializing in severe weather. It operates a free website that allows the public to access a considerable amount of information on these climatic phenomena thanks to real-time data, analytical articles, etc. It is also a consultancy firm that sells its expertise to companies and institutions that need forecasts or more detailed information.

== History ==
The company was founded in 2006 by two self-taught meteorologists, Pierre Mahieu and Emmanuel Wesolek, who felt that France lacked an organization specializing in the detection and study of thunderstorms. The owners of the Keraunos research office use the North American method of approaching this subject and have already published several articles in world-renowned meteorology journals. Keraunos became a simplified joint-stock company on September 6, 2010.

== Mission ==
Keraunos employs multidisciplinary experts, some with over 20 years of experience, in meteorology, climatology, hydrology, and risk management. Its activities include weather forecasting, weather warnings, and expertise for hail, tornadoes, lightning, severe gusts, and torrential rains.

Keraunos provides the general public with free, high-quality information on storm events affecting the population, as well as a range of paid services for businesses and communities. Keraunos consultants frequently provide media input on both weather news and scientific documentaries on the subject.

== Services ==
Keraunos has its own autonomous forecasting center, specialized in the field of violent phenomena. It runs numerical weather prediction models at variable resolutions, up to 0.9 km, over France. Some models are deterministic and others probabilistic to increase the reliability of forecasts.

=== Website ===
The free website offers:

- real-time tracking of thunderstorm activity in France.
- forecasting of areas at risk for thunderstorm development.
- articles on recent news stories that have made headlines.
- a library of thunderstorm photos, including those taken by storm chasers.
- databases of thunderstorm events with "post-the-fact" analyses of historical tornado cases.
- articles on severe thunderstorms for public education.
- publications, including some published in scientific journals, analyzing cases of severe thunderstorms.

=== Consulting Services ===
The services provided for a fee are tailored to meet each need in three areas:

- specialized forecast bulletins for storms and related risks (hail, gusts, intense rain, etc.) requested by the user, ranging from short to long term.
- alerts for the user of the development of severe weather phenomena and post-occurrence reports.
- providing a proprietary database of hail, tornadoes, wind gusts, torrential rain, and other intense weather phenomena occurring in France to conduct expert assessments for clients and provide a climatology of weather risk exposure, municipality by municipality in France.

== Other Activities ==
Keraunos experts participate in various international conferences on severe thunderstorms. The organization also organizes seminars for enthusiasts, researchers, professionals, and storm chasers. Some publications by KERAUNOS members are:

- Emmanuel Wesolek; Pierre Mahieu (Observatoire Français des Tornades et des Orages Violents) (June 2011). "The F4 tornado of August 3, 2008, in Northern France: Case study of a tornadic storm in a low CAPE environment". Atmospheric Research (5th European Conference on Severe Storms). 100 (4). Elsevier: 649–656. Bibcode:2011AtmRe.100..649W. doi:10.1016/j.atmosres.2010.09.003.
- Emmanuel Wesolek; Pierre Mahieu (Observatoire Français des Tornades et des Orages Violents) (October 2011). "Contribution to an European Adaptation of the Enhanced Fujita Scale : Analysis of Damage Caused by Tornadoes in France" (PDF). Atmospheric Research (6th European Conference On Severe Storms). Palma de Mallorca: Elsevier.
- C. Berthet; E. Wesolek; Dessensa; J.L. Sanchez (Observatoire Français des Tornades et des Orages Violents) (April 2013). "Extreme Hail Day Climatology in Southwestern France". Atmospheric Research. 123 (1). Elsevier: 139–150. Bibcode:2013AtmRe.123..139B. doi:10.1016/j.atmosres.2012.10.007.
- Thilo Kühne; Georg Pistotnik; Emmanuel Wesolek; Pierre Mahieu; Artur Surowiecki (June 2013). "Obstacles and barriers in research work on historical tornadoes in Central Europe". 7th European Conference on Severe Storms. doi:10.13140/2.1.1402.9605.
