= Pavlovskaya, Totemsky District, Vologda Oblast =

Pavlovskaya Павловская
- Village
- Location within Vologda Oblast Location within Russia
- Coordinates: 59°43′N 42°26′E
- Country: Russia
- Region: Vologda Oblast
- District: Totemsky District
- Time zone: UTC+3:00

Pavlovskaya (Russian: Павловская) is a rural locality (a village) in Kalininskoye Rural Settlement, Totemsky District, Vologda Oblast, Russia. The population was 4 as of 2002.

== Geography ==
Pavlovskaya is located 48 km southwest of Totma (the district's administrative centre) by road. Osovaya is the nearest rural locality.
