= Beloveža =

- Municipality
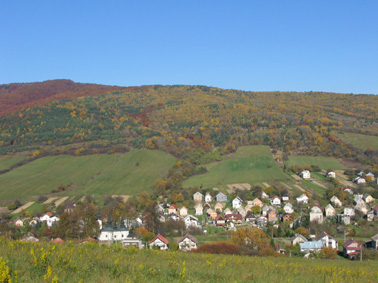

- Flag Coat of arms

- Location of Beloveža in the Prešov Region Location of Beloveža in Slovakia
- Coordinates: 49.28°N 21.37°E
- Country: Slovakia
- Region: Prešov Region
- District: Bardejov District
- First mentioned: 1355

Area
  - Total: 10.15 km^{2} (3.92 sq mi)
- Elevation: 295 m (968 ft)

Population (2025)
  - Total: 789
- Time zone: UTC+1 (CET)
  - Summer (DST): UTC+2 (CEST)
- Postal code: 861 4
- Area code: +421 54
- Vehicle registration plate (until 2022): BJ
- Website: beloveza.com

Beloveža (Rusyn: Біловежа, romanized: Bilovezha, Hungarian: Bélavézse) is a village and municipality in Bardejov District, in the Prešov Region of north-east Slovakia.

== History ==
In historical records, the village was first mentioned in 1355. The Catholic church of St. Michael the Archangel of 1778 can be found in the village.

== Geography ==
The municipality lies at an altitude of 295 metres (968 ft) and covers an area of 10.15 km^{2} (3.92 sq mi) (2025).

== Population ==
Population statistic (10 years)
Year	1995	2005	2015	2025
Count	813	816	804	789
Difference		+0.36%	−1.47%	−1.86%

Population statistic
Year	2024	2025
Count	789	789
Difference		+0%

It has a population of 789 people (31 December 2025).

=== Ethnicity ===
Census 2021 (1+ %)
Ethnicity	Number	Fraction
Slovak	695	89.67%
Rusyn	264	34.06%
Not found out	11	1.41%
Ukrainian	8	1.03%
Total	775	

In year 2021 was 775 people by ethnicity 695 as Slovak, 264 as Rusyn, 11 as Not found out, 8 as Ukrainian, 3 as Czech, 1 as Hungarian and 1 as Other.

Note on population: The difference values of population numbers in the table "Population statistic" and in the sections "Ethnicity" & "Religion" is caused by the use of various statistical methods.

=== Religion ===
Census 2021 (1+ %)
Religion	Number	Fraction
Greek Catholic Church	620	80%
Roman Catholic Church	78	10.06%
None	45	5.81%
Eastern Orthodox Church	13	1.68%
Evangelical Church	10	1.29%
Not found out	8	1.03%
Total	775	

In year 2021 was 775 people by religion 620 from Greek Catholic Church, 78 from Roman Catholic Church, 45 from None, 13 from Eastern Orthodox Church, 10 from Evangelical Church, 8 from Not found out and 1 from Other.

== Genealogical resources ==
The records for genealogical research are available at the state archive "Statny Archiv in Presov, Slovakia"

- Roman Catholic church records (births/marriages/deaths): 1750-1896 (parish B)
- Greek Catholic church records (births/marriages/deaths): 1753-1906 (parish A)

== See also ==
- List of municipalities and towns in Slovakia
