= Luhavaya Slabada =

Agrotown in Minsk Region, Belarus

Luhavaya Slabada Лугавая Слабада (Belarusian) Луговая Слобода (Russian)
- Agrotown
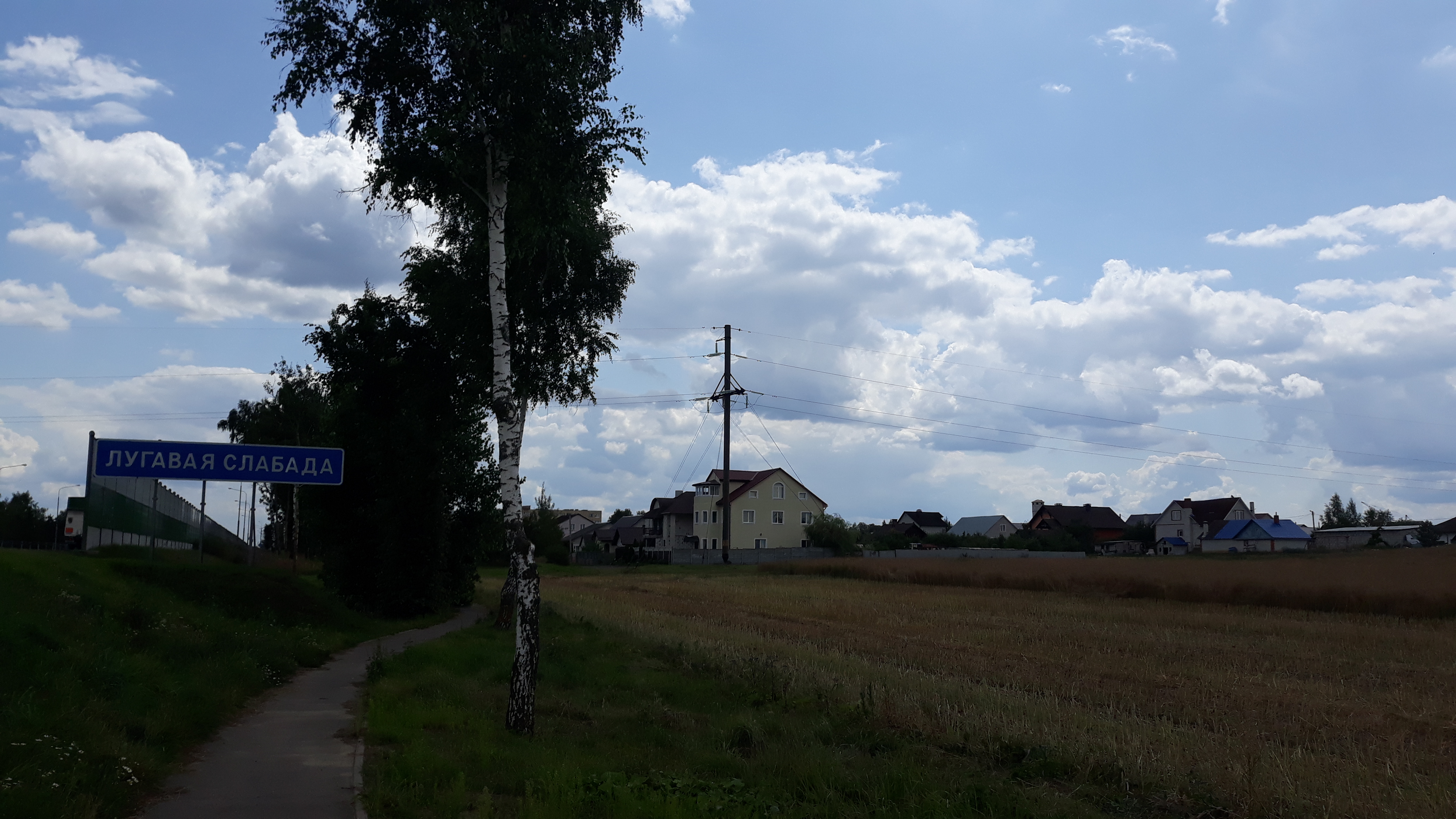

- Location within Belarus
- Coordinates: 53°47′00″N 27°50′59″E
- Country: Belarus
- Region: Minsk Region
- District: Minsk District

Population (2010)
  - Total: 1,436
- Time zone: UTC+3 (MSK)

Luhavaya Slabada (Belarusian: Лугавая Слабада; Russian: Луговая Слобода, romanized: Lugovaya Sloboda) is an agrotown in Minsk District, Minsk Region, Belarus. It serves as the administrative center of Luhavaya Slabada rural council. It is located 22 kilometres (14 mi) southeast of the capital Minsk and 15 kilometres (9.3 mi) from Mikhanavichy. In 1999, it had a population of 1,238. In 2010, it had a population of 1,436.
