= Radostów, Lublin Voivodeship =

Radostów
- Village
- Location within Poland
- Coordinates: 50°35′N 23°53′E
- Country: Poland
- Voivodeship: Lublin
- County: Hrubieszów
- Gmina: Mircze

Radostów [raˈdɔstuf] is a village in the administrative district of Gmina Mircze, within Hrubieszów County, Lublin Voivodeship, in eastern Poland, close to the border with Ukraine.
