= Château de Fougeret =

Château in Vienne, France

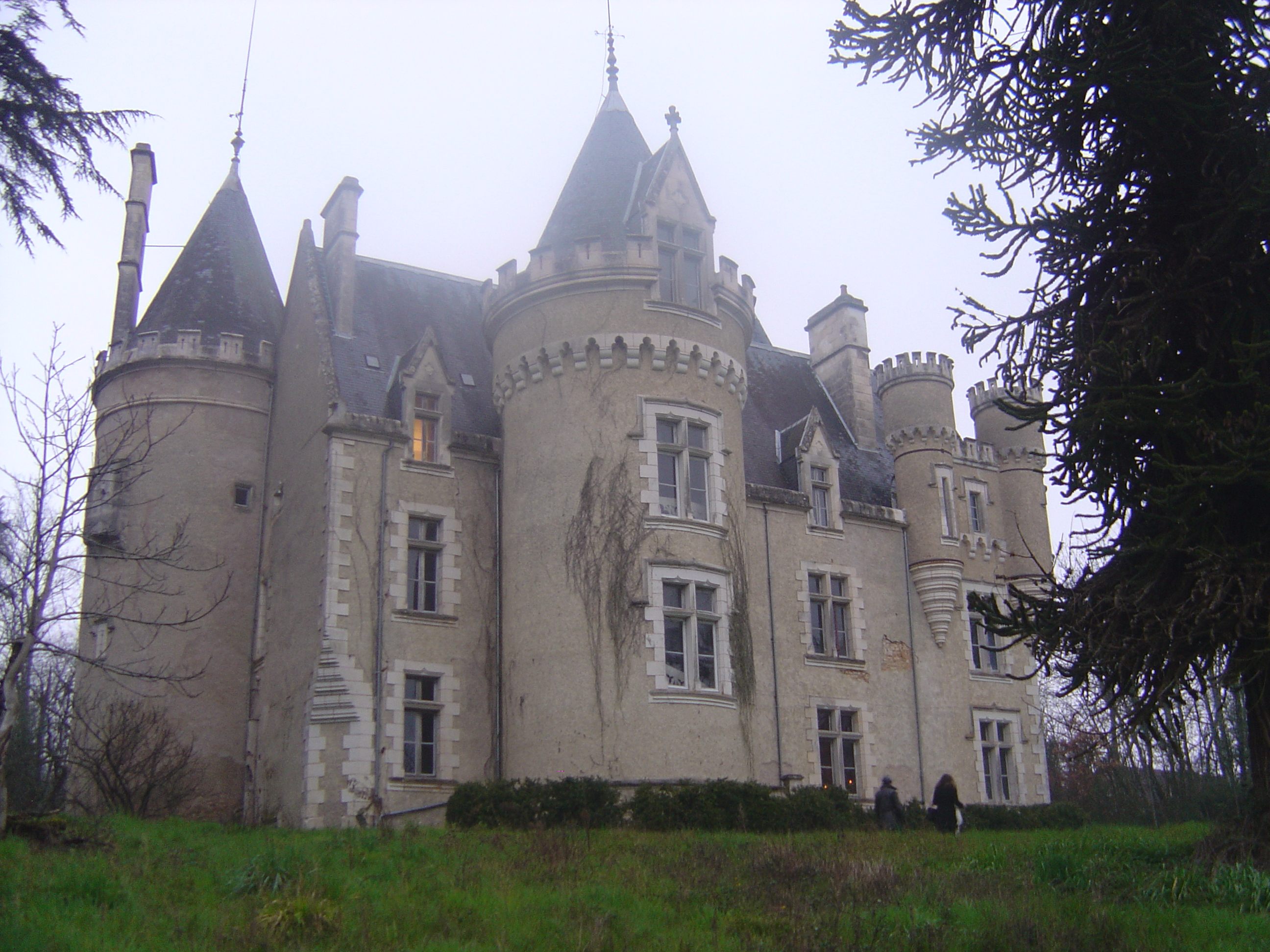
- The rear elevation

- Location within France Château de Fougeret (Nouvelle-Aquitaine) Château de Fougeret (Vienne)

General information
- Type: Château
- Location: Queaux, France
- Coordinates: 46.338795°N 0.674436°E
- Owner: Véronique Geffroy

Website
- www.fougeret.com

Monument historique
- Designated: 9 November 2010
- Reference no.: PA86000040

The Château de Fougeret is a château, located in Queaux, in the French department of Vienne, Nouvelle-Aquitaine, France. It was built between the 15th and 16th centuries and widely renovated during the 19th century.

It has been listed as a historical monument since 2010.

== Description ==
Located at the top of a 38-metre cliff (125 ft), it dominates the Vienne Valley. It has a 10-hectare park (25-acre) along the Vienne River with an arboretum of species coming from the New World, such as American walnuts, giant sequoias, etc.

The corps de logis is flanked by three round towers and a chapel. Two independent towers are added close to the main building.

The leaflet from the Ministry of Culture, which designated the château as a historical monument, mentions, for example, a few remarkable elements; wall paintings and frescoes, ceilings with flat floor arches decorated and painted, a mosaic, woodwork, a monumental Gothic fireplace made of sculpted stone, a spiral staircase built of stone in Gothic style with a tracery railing like the staircase of Chambord and mullioned windows.

It has kept some elements from the Middle Ages, including its brattices, basement, sarcophagus, icehouse and two mullioned windows. Its renovation in the 19th century by a bourgeois family was done to modernise and stage the richness and the significance of its owners. Another level is added, the distribution and the organisation of the windows are rethought and the inside becomes advanced.

In 2009, Véronique Geffroy and her husband François buy the château, after years of abandon and decide to restore it to move in.

== Paranormal activities ==
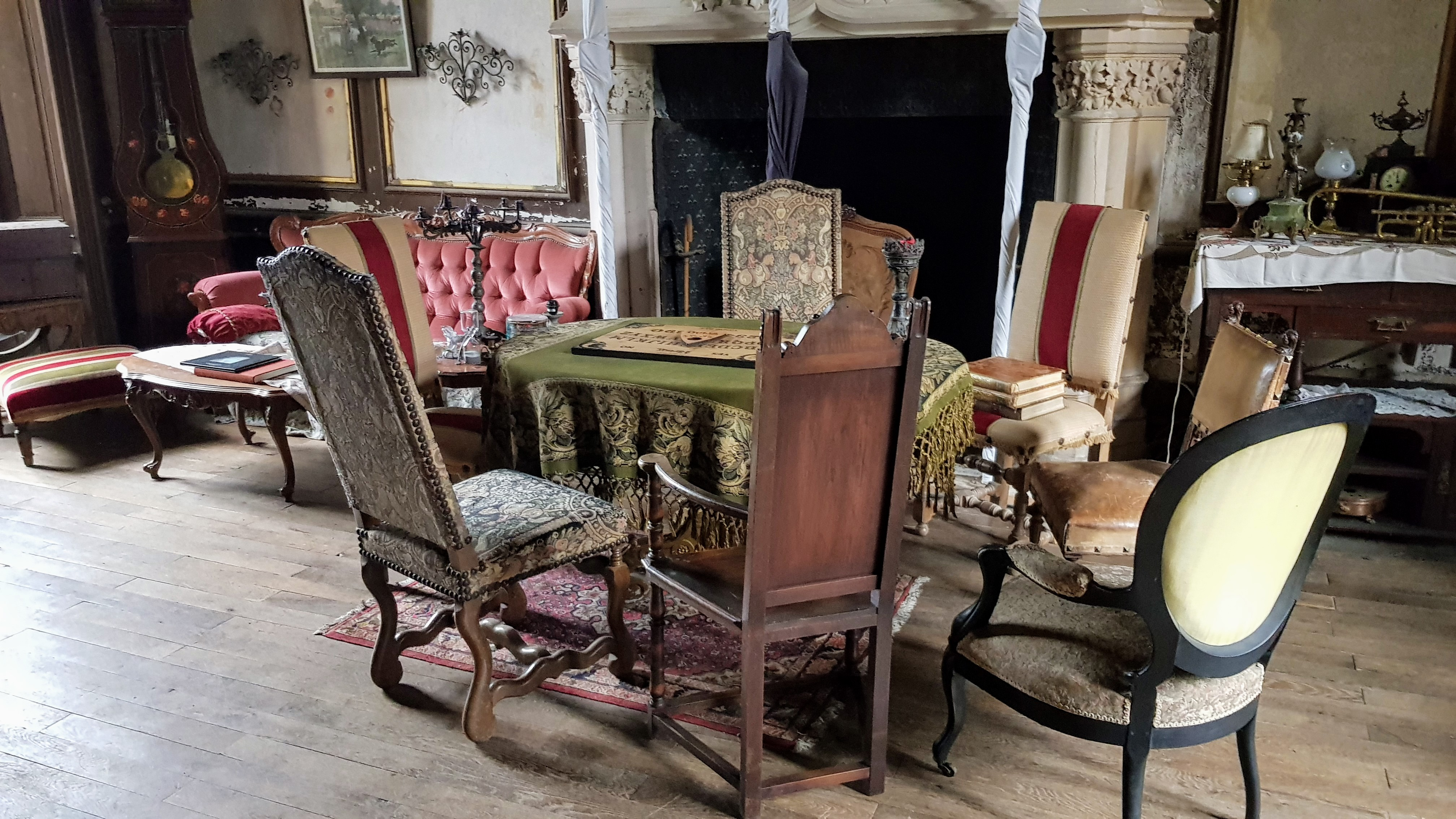
A spirit Ouija table in the sitting room

After they bought the château in 2009, the new owners had to face the lack of money and the discovery of new unplanned repairs.

According to them, they have been witnesses of paranormal events, which leads them to organise paranormal nights in the château from 2010 despite the very bad state and the risk for the visitors (electric hazard, weak floors, lack of fire alarm, safety lighting, emergency exits, etc.).

The concept works well and attracts a lot of people. So much that a lot of media dedicated TV shows to the story and its paranormal activity. Fougeret is regularly referred to on the internet and television as "the most haunted place in France". These shows and a lot of YouTubers made for the fame of the château.

Of course, people mostly know that the story and the folklore around Fougeret are a tourist attraction to pay the bills.
