= Château de Châlucet =

Ruined castle in Nouvelle-Aquitaine, France

Coordinates: 45°43′56″N 1°18′40″E

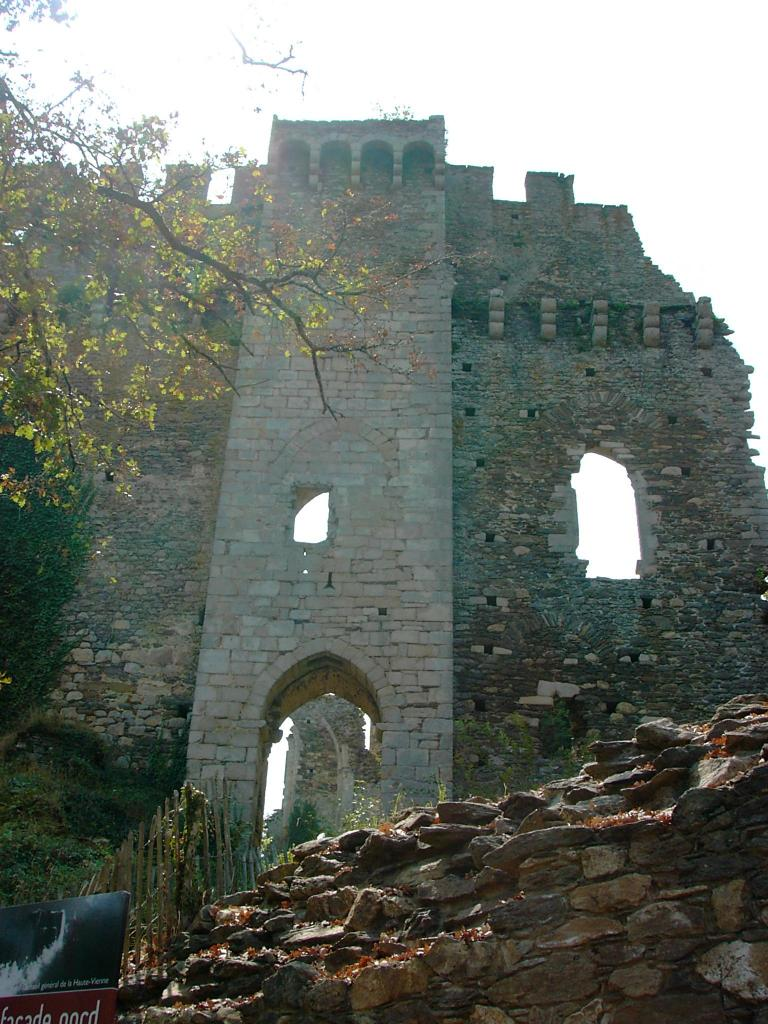
North side of Châlucet

The Château de Châlucet (sometimes written as Chalusset), a ruined castle, is in the commune of Saint-Jean-Ligoure, about 10 km to the south of Limoges, in the département of Haute-Vienne, and less than 2 km from the Pôle de Lanaud.

The ruins dominate the confluence of the rivers Briance and Ligoure.

== History ==
The castle was built in the 13th century by Bishop Eustorge. In 1306, it was ceded by Henri de Sully to the French king, Philip IV. In 1369, it was attacked by the English. It was a refuge for Huguenots during the Wars of Religion. In 1539, the townspeople of Limoges secured its demolition.

An object of power for the local lords and belonging to the Abbey of Solignac, it was the symbol of the feudal power for those (mainly bishops or Viscounts of Limoges) who disputed the use and control of it. At the beginning of the 14th century, the king of France himself seemed to make very large investments there. By an irony of the history, its defensive role, very dissuasive until the 15th century, was fully used during the Hundred Years' War by bands of plunderers which roamed the country.

== Description ==
The castle is a medieval fortress, with a purely defensive goal; it is composed of two parts:

- a castle, on the top of a timbered rocky overcrop represents the upper Châlucet (French: Haut Châlucet);
- a square keep of the 12th century, called "Tour Jeanette" is the remaining part of the residence building, that was the lower Châlucet (French: bas Châlucet). The overall shape of the fortress was trapezoidal, and was composed of the main building (formerly arched), courtyards, and the keep.

Restored at the end of the 1990s, the Château de Châlucet is easily accessible today, with a tourist circuit and explanatory panels. The castle is open to visitors all year, with guided tours possible from April to November.

The property of the département, it has been listed since 1875 as a monument historique by the French Ministry of Culture.

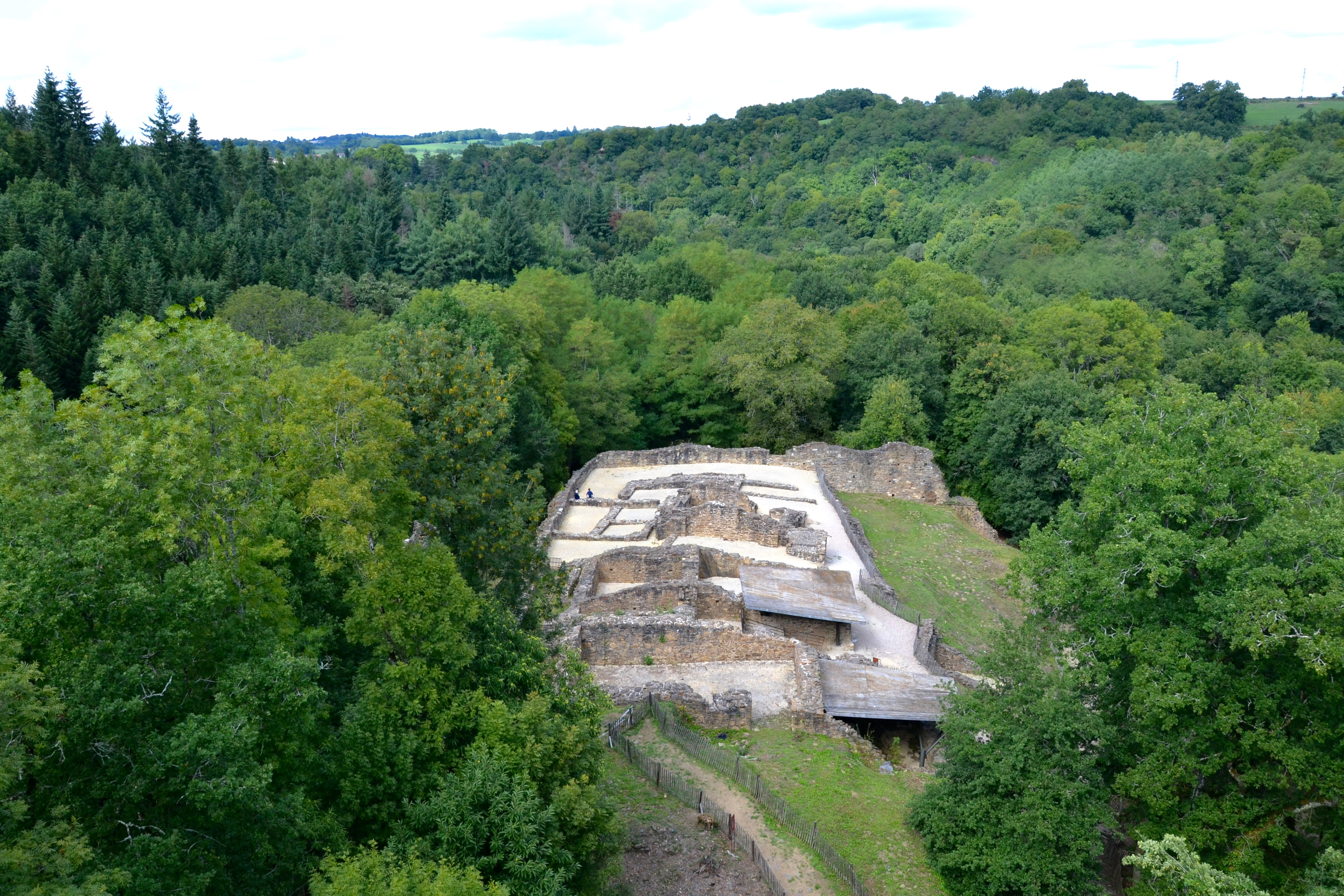
The lower castle from the Tour Jeannette

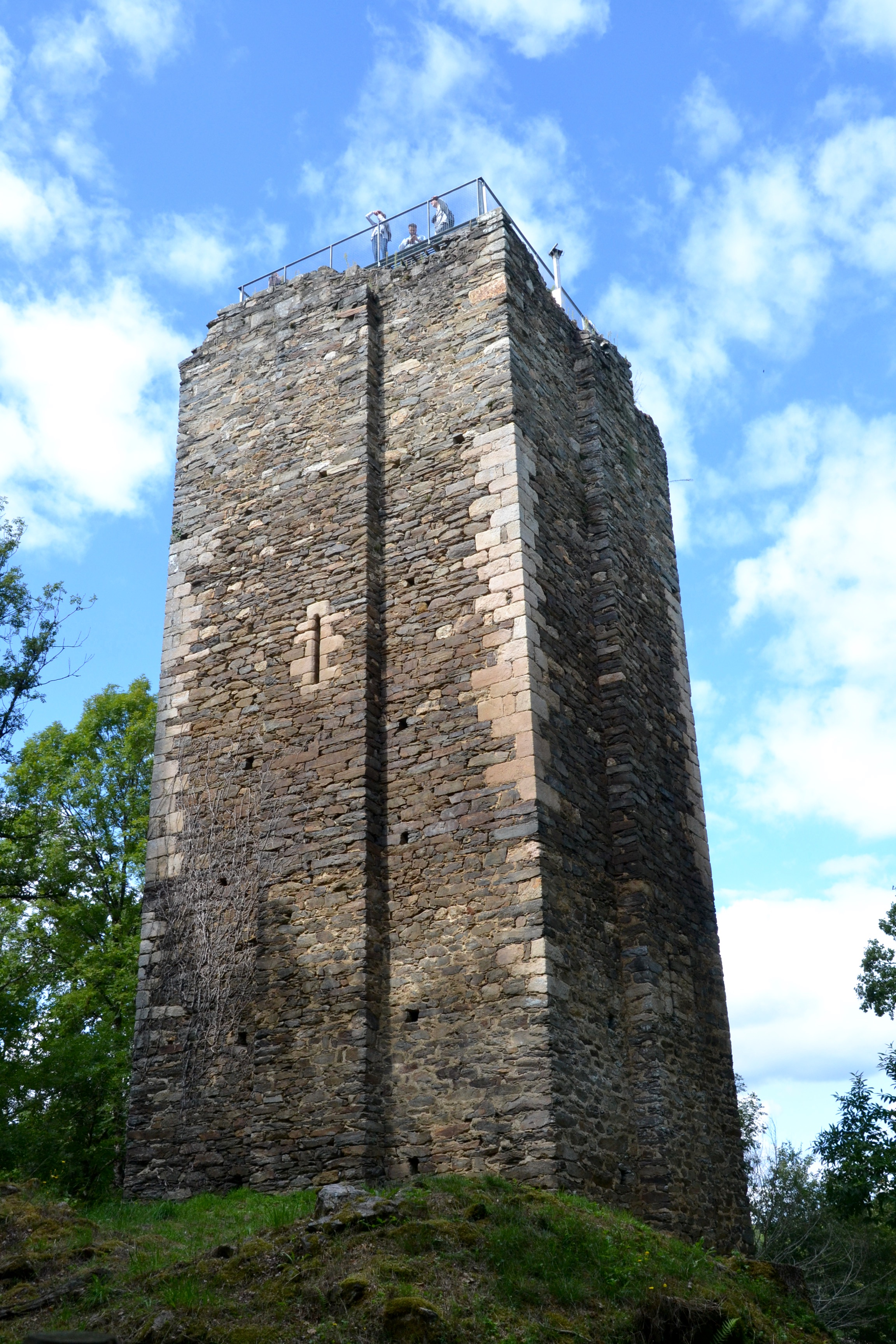
Tour Jeannette

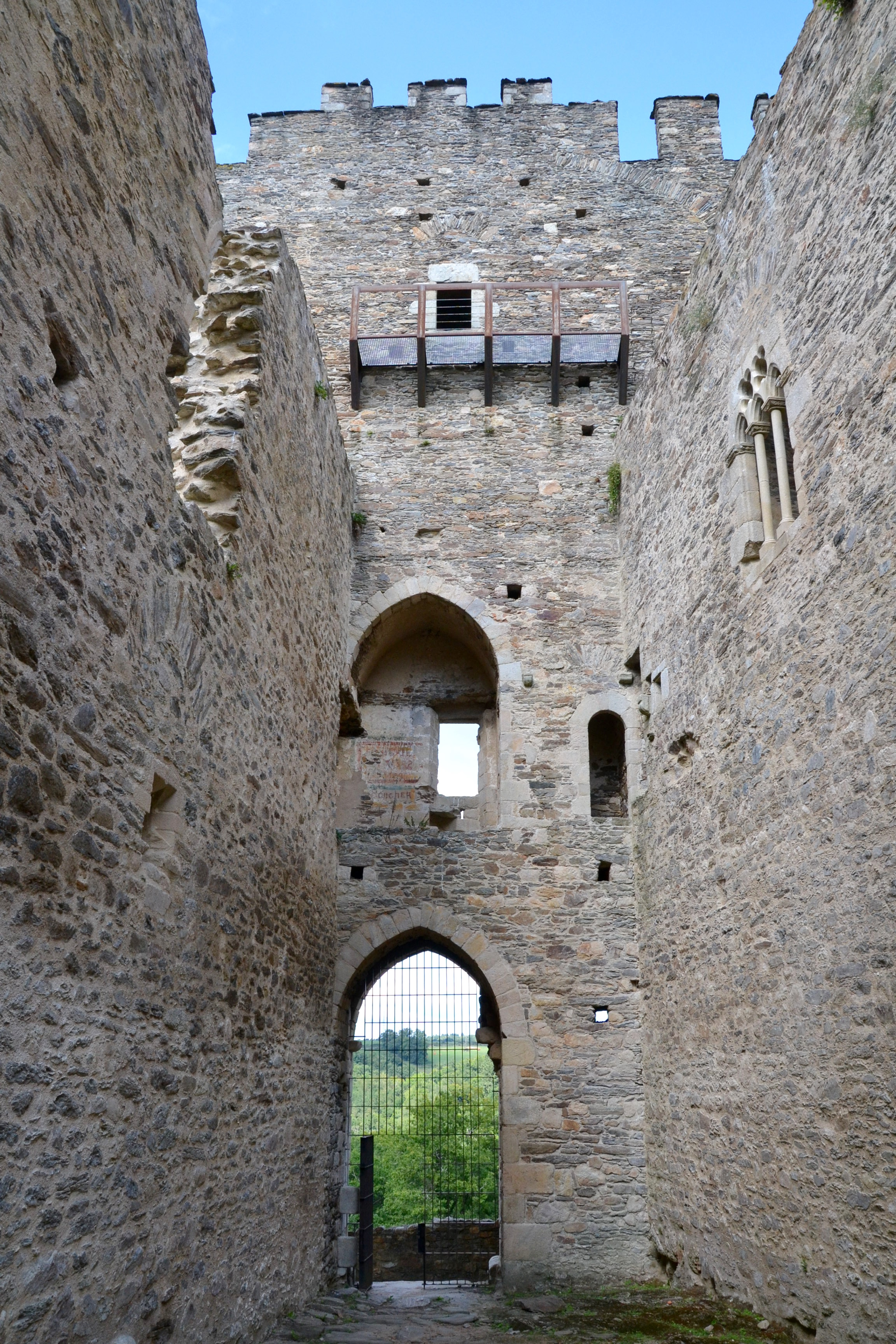
The lower castle

== See also ==
- List of castles in France
