= Bosmie-l'Aiguille =

- Commune
- Coat of arms
- Location of Bosmie-l'Aiguille
- Location within France Location within Nouvelle-Aquitaine
- Coordinates: 45°46′07″N 1°13′39″E
- Country: France
- Region: Nouvelle-Aquitaine
- Department: Haute-Vienne
- Arrondissement: Limoges
- Canton: Aixe-sur-Vienne
- Intercommunality: Val de Vienne

Government
  - Mayor (2020–2026): Maurice Leboutet
- Area^{1}: 8.01 km^{2} (3.09 sq mi)
- Highest elevation: 375 m (1,230 ft)
- Lowest elevation: 210 m (690 ft)
- Population (2023): 2,667
  - Density: 333/km^{2} (862/sq mi)
- Time zone: UTC+01:00 (CET)
  - Summer (DST): UTC+02:00 (CEST)
- INSEE/Postal code: 87021 /87110
- ^{1} French Land Register data, which excludes lakes, ponds, glaciers > 1 km^{2} (0.386 sq mi or 247 acres) and river estuaries.

Bosmie-l'Aiguille (French pronunciation: [bɔsmi lɛɡɥij]; Occitan: Bòsc Mian) is a commune in the Haute-Vienne department in the Nouvelle-Aquitaine region in western France.

== Geography ==
The river Briance forms all of the commune's north-eastern border, then flows into the Vienne, which forms part of its northern border. L'Aiguille station has rail connections to Bordeaux, Périgueux, Brive-la-Gaillarde and Limoges.

== Population ==
Historical population
Year	Pop.	±% p.a.
1968	1,191	—
1975	1,332	+1.61%
1982	1,704	+3.58%
1990	1,950	+1.70%
1999	2,197	+1.33%
2007	2,279	+0.46%
2012	2,418	+1.19%
2017	2,579	+1.30%
2023	2,667	+0.56%
Source: INSEE

Inhabitants are known as Bosmiauds in French.

== See also ==
- Communes of the Haute-Vienne department
