= Saint-Genest-sur-Roselle =

- Commune
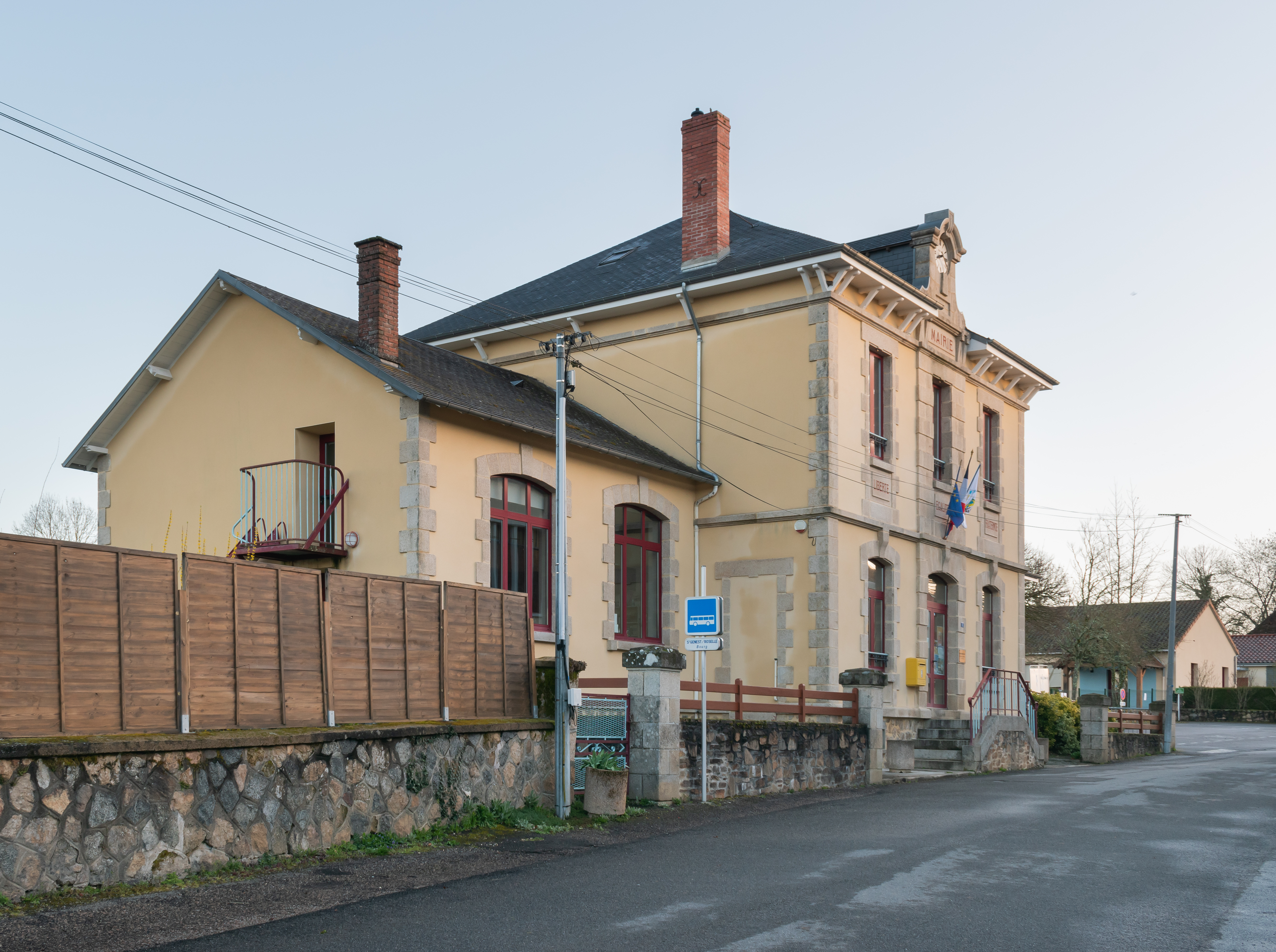
- The town hall in Saint-Genest-sur-Roselle
- Location of Saint-Genest-sur-Roselle
- Location within France Location within Nouvelle-Aquitaine
- Coordinates: 45°42′14″N 1°25′37″E
- Country: France
- Region: Nouvelle-Aquitaine
- Department: Haute-Vienne
- Arrondissement: Limoges
- Canton: Condat-sur-Vienne

Government
  - Mayor (2020–2026): Jacqueline Lhomme Leoment
- Area^{1}: 19.22 km^{2} (7.42 sq mi)
- Highest elevation: 421 m (1,381 ft)
- Lowest elevation: 270 m (890 ft)
- Population (2023): 540
  - Density: 28/km^{2} (73/sq mi)
- Time zone: UTC+01:00 (CET)
  - Summer (DST): UTC+02:00 (CEST)
- INSEE/Postal code: 87144 /87260
- ^{1} French Land Register data, which excludes lakes, ponds, glaciers > 1 km^{2} (0.386 sq mi or 247 acres) and river estuaries.

Saint-Genest-sur-Roselle (Occitan: Sent Giniés) is a commune in the Haute-Vienne department in the Nouvelle-Aquitaine region in west-central France.

== Geography ==
The Roselle, a tributary of the Briance, forms most of the commune's northern border; the Briance forms all of its southern border.

== See also ==
- Communes of the Haute-Vienne department
