= Saint-Maurice-les-Brousses =

- Commune
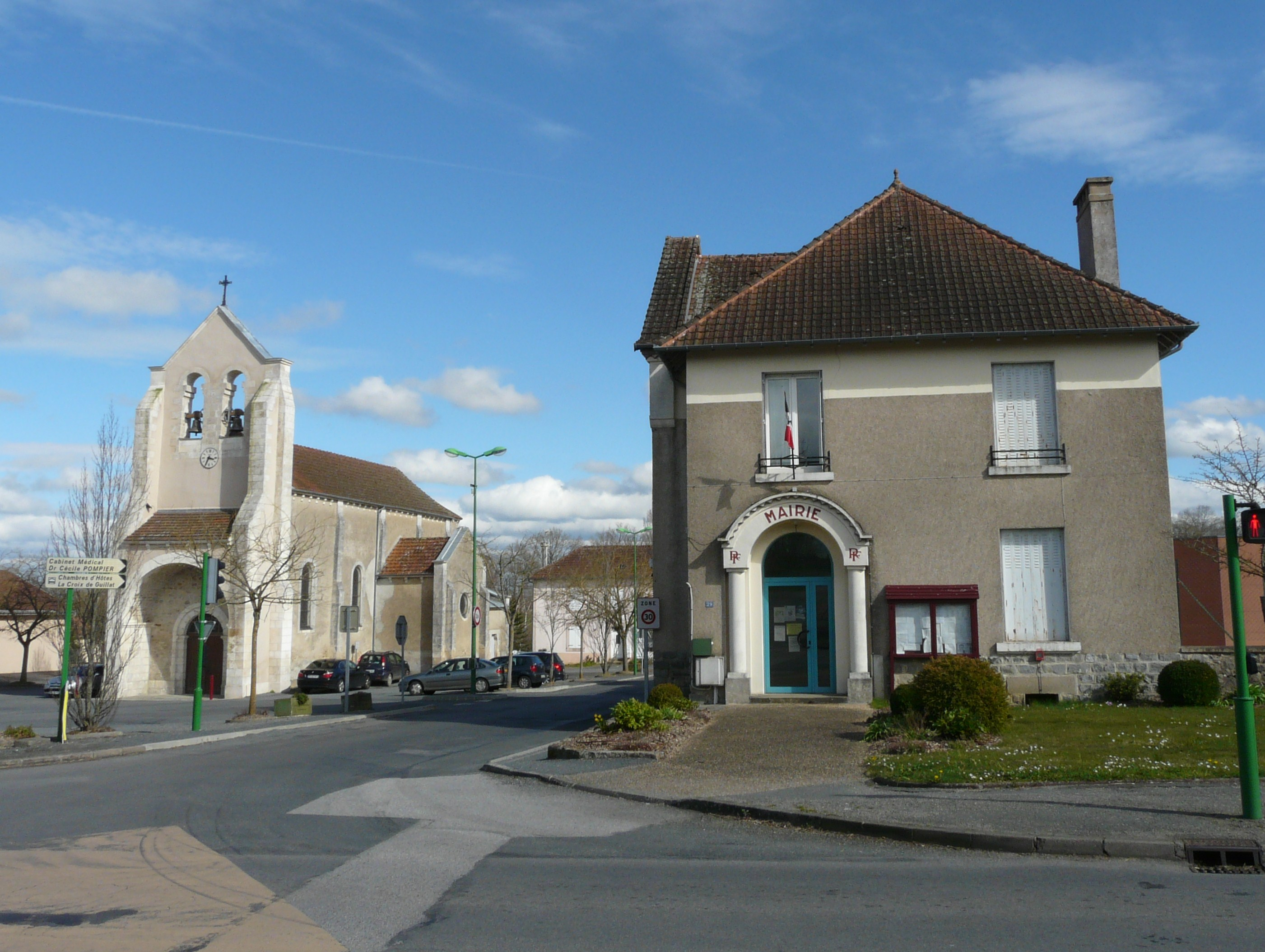
- Town hall
- Location of Saint-Maurice-les-Brousses
- Location within France Location within Nouvelle-Aquitaine
- Coordinates: 45°42′01″N 1°14′13″E
- Country: France
- Region: Nouvelle-Aquitaine
- Department: Haute-Vienne
- Arrondissement: Limoges
- Canton: Condat-sur-Vienne

Government
  - Mayor (2020–2026): Georges Dargentolle
- Area^{1}: 10.87 km^{2} (4.20 sq mi)
- Highest elevation: 413 m (1,355 ft)
- Lowest elevation: 319 m (1,047 ft)
- Population (2023): 1,041
  - Density: 95.77/km^{2} (248.0/sq mi)
- Time zone: UTC+01:00 (CET)
  - Summer (DST): UTC+02:00 (CEST)
- INSEE/Postal code: 87169 /87800
- ^{1} French Land Register data, which excludes lakes, ponds, glaciers > 1 km^{2} (0.386 sq mi or 247 acres) and river estuaries.

Saint-Maurice-les-Brousses (French: [sɛ̃ mɔʁis le bʁus]; Occitan: Sent Mauseris) is a commune in the Haute-Vienne department in the Nouvelle-Aquitaine region in west-central France.

== See also ==
- Communes of the Haute-Vienne department
