= Canton of Condat-sur-Vienne =

Coordinates: 45.79°N 1.23°E

The canton of Condat-sur-Vienne is an administrative division of the Haute-Vienne department, western France. It was created at the French canton reorganisation which came into effect in March 2015. Its seat is in Condat-sur-Vienne.

It consists of the following communes:

1. Boisseuil
2. Condat-sur-Vienne
3. Eyjeaux
4. Pierre-Buffière
5. Saint-Bonnet-Briance
6. Saint-Genest-sur-Roselle
7. Saint-Hilaire-Bonneval
8. Saint-Jean-Ligoure
9. Saint-Maurice-les-Brousses
10. Saint-Paul
11. Solignac
12. Le Vigen
