= Saint-Hilaire-Bonneval =

- Commune
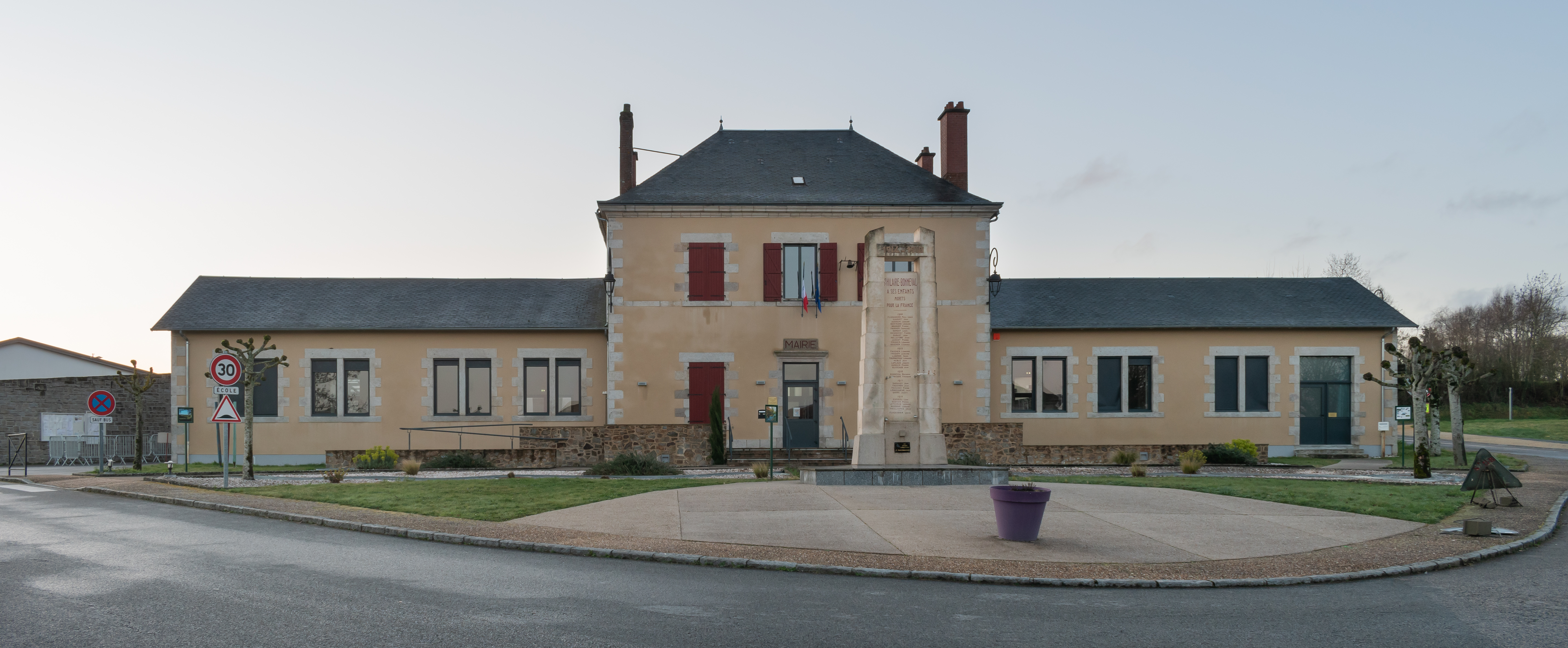
- Town hall in Saint-Hilaire-Bonneval

- Coat of arms
- Location of Saint-Hilaire-Bonneval
- Location within France Location within Nouvelle-Aquitaine
- Coordinates: 45°43′13″N 1°22′30″E
- Country: France
- Region: Nouvelle-Aquitaine
- Department: Haute-Vienne
- Arrondissement: Limoges
- Canton: Condat-sur-Vienne

Government
  - Mayor (2020–2026): Christian Latouille
- Area^{1}: 28.49 km^{2} (11.00 sq mi)
- Highest elevation: 383 m (1,257 ft)
- Lowest elevation: 229 m (751 ft)
- Population (2023): 1,010
  - Density: 35.5/km^{2} (91.8/sq mi)
- Time zone: UTC+01:00 (CET)
  - Summer (DST): UTC+02:00 (CEST)
- INSEE/Postal code: 87148 /87260
- ^{1} French Land Register data, which excludes lakes, ponds, glaciers > 1 km^{2} (0.386 sq mi or 247 acres) and river estuaries.

Saint-Hilaire-Bonneval (French pronunciation: [sɛ̃.t‿ilɛʁ bɔnval]; Occitan: Sent Alari Bona Vau) is a commune in the Haute-Vienne department in the Nouvelle-Aquitaine region in west-central France.

== Geography ==
The river Briance forms all of the commune's western border.

== See also ==
- Communes of the Haute-Vienne department
