= Pierre-Buffière station =

Railway station in Pierre-Buffière, France

Coordinates: 45°41′58″N 1°20′51″E

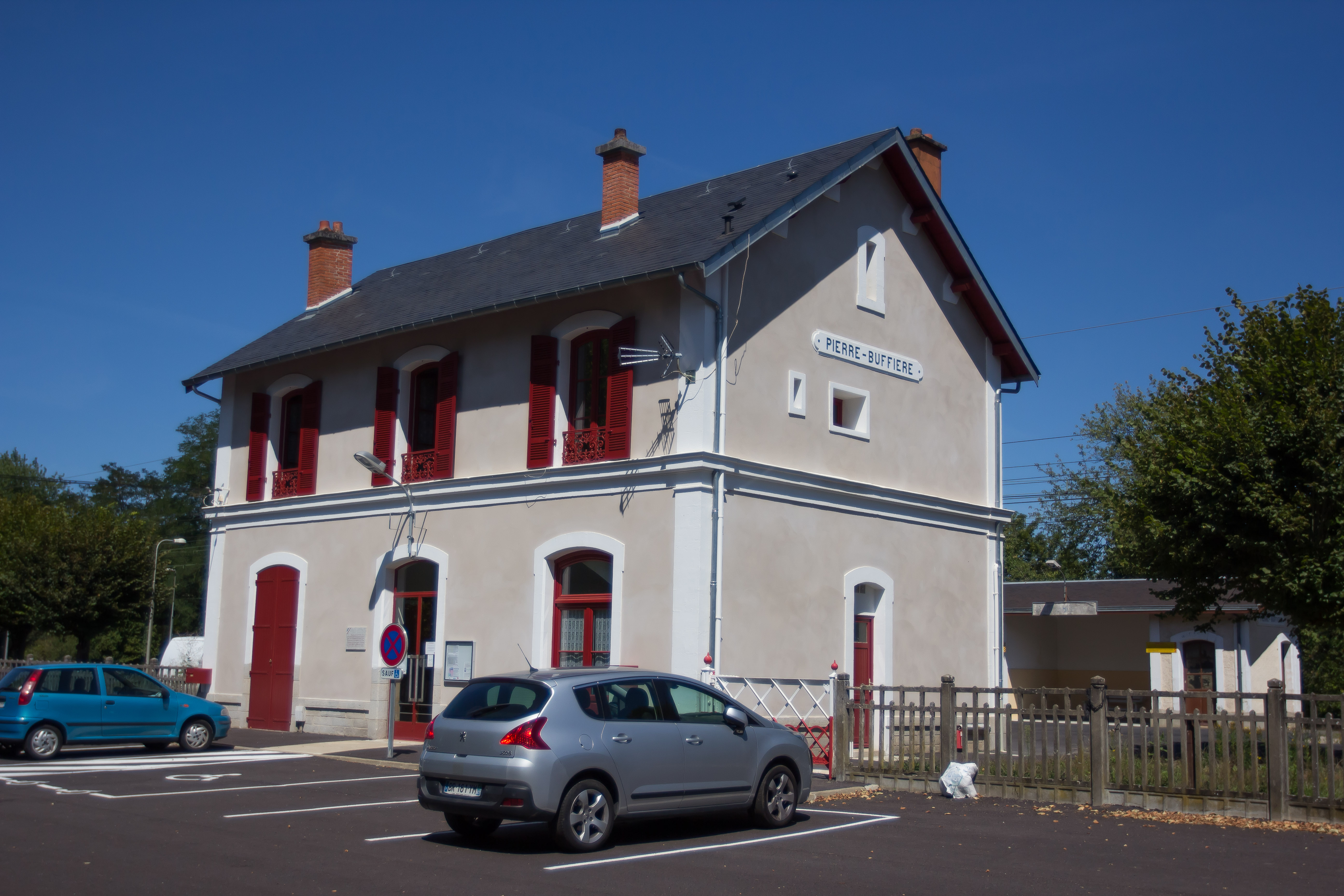
The station in 2015.

Pierre-Buffière is a railway station in Pierre-Buffière, Nouvelle-Aquitaine, France. The station opened on 1 July 1893 and is located on the Orléans–Montauban railway line. The station is served by TER (local) services operated by SNCF.

== Train services ==
The following services currently call at Pierre-Buffière:

- local service (TER Nouvelle-Aquitaine) Limoges - Uzerche - Brive-la-Gaillarde

Preceding station	TER Nouvelle-Aquitaine	Following station
Solignac-Le Vigen towards Limoges	22	Magnac-Vicq towards Brive-la-Gaillarde
