= Pierre-Buffière =

- Commune
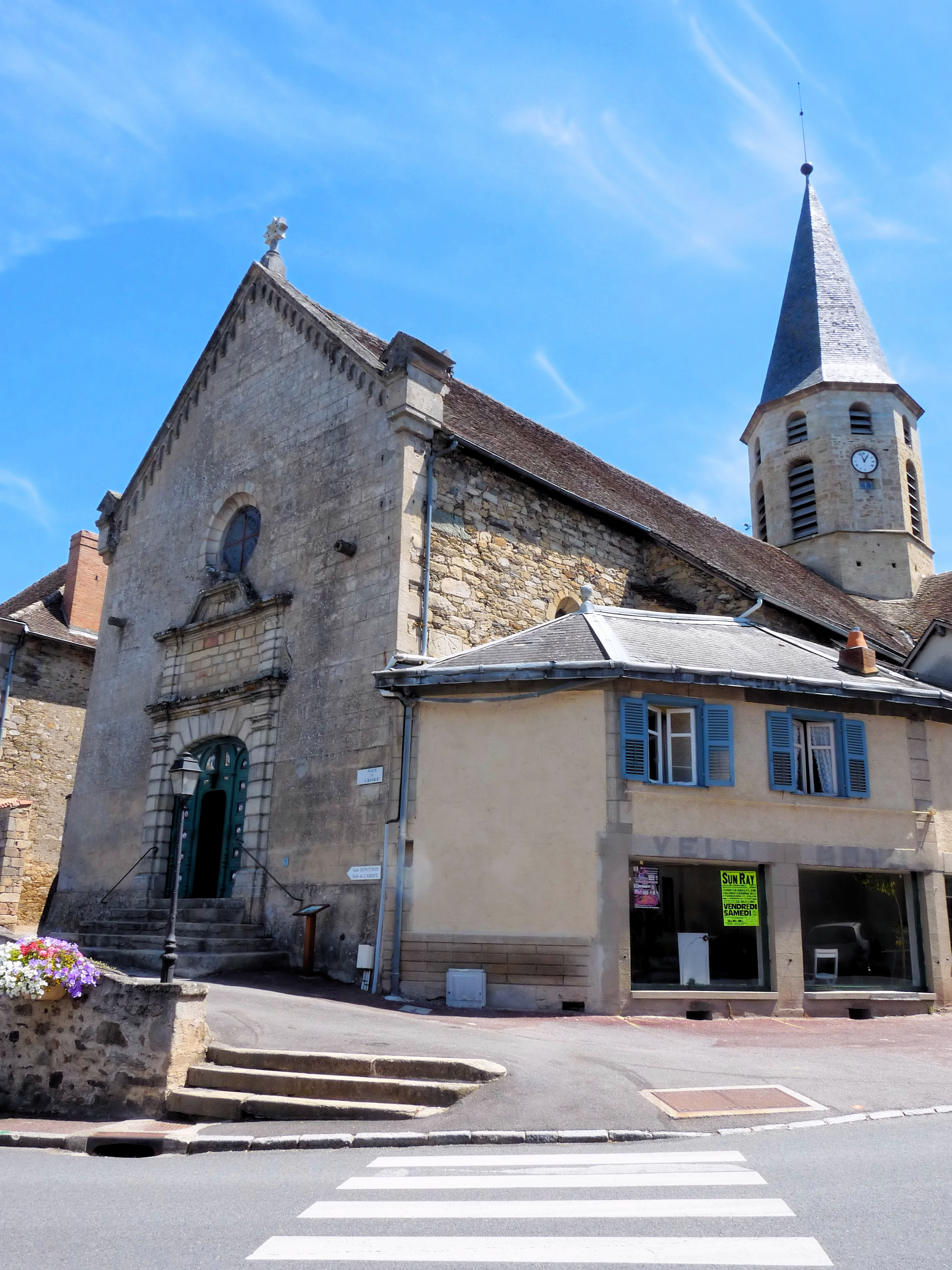
- The church in Pierre-Buffière

- Coat of arms
- Location of Pierre-Buffière
- Location within France Location within Nouvelle-Aquitaine
- Coordinates: 45°41′44″N 1°21′36″E
- Country: France
- Region: Nouvelle-Aquitaine
- Department: Haute-Vienne
- Arrondissement: Limoges
- Canton: Condat-sur-Vienne

Government
  - Mayor (2020–2026): Stéphane Patier
- Area^{1}: 5.75 km^{2} (2.22 sq mi)
- Highest elevation: 374 m (1,227 ft)
- Lowest elevation: 240 m (790 ft)
- Population (2023): 1,139
  - Density: 198/km^{2} (513/sq mi)
- Time zone: UTC+01:00 (CET)
  - Summer (DST): UTC+02:00 (CEST)
- INSEE/Postal code: 87119 /87260
- ^{1} French Land Register data, which excludes lakes, ponds, glaciers > 1 km^{2} (0.386 sq mi or 247 acres) and river estuaries.

Pierre-Buffière (French pronunciation: [pjɛʁ byfjɛʁ]; Occitan: Peira Bufiera) is a commune in the Haute-Vienne department in the Nouvelle-Aquitaine region in west-central France. Inhabitants are known as Pierre-Buffiérois.

The commune is listed as a Village étape.

== Geography ==
The village lies on the left bank of the Briance, which flows westward through the northern part of the commune. Pierre-Buffière station has rail connections to Brive-la-Gaillarde and Limoges.

== Gallery ==
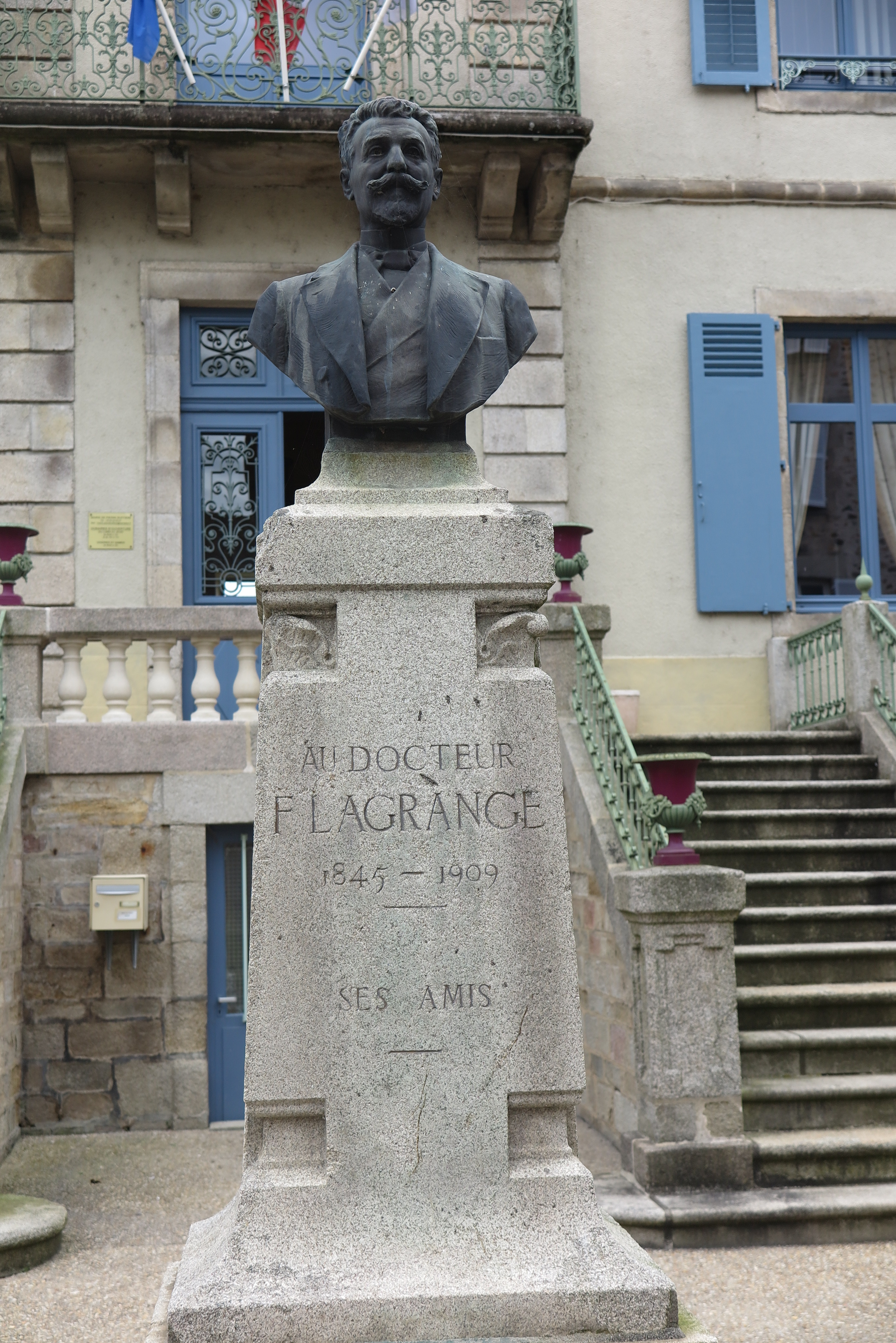
Fernand Lagrange

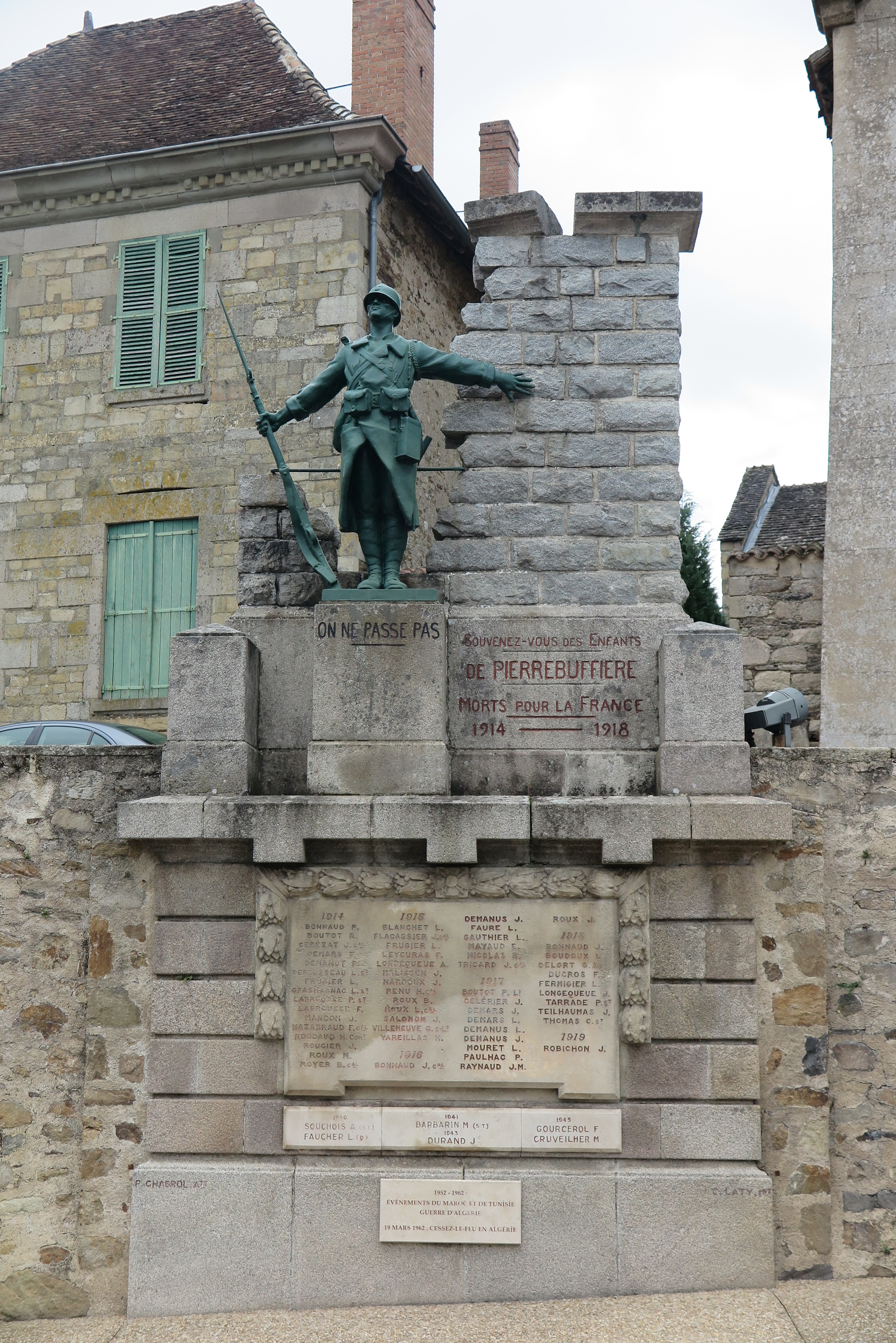
War memorial

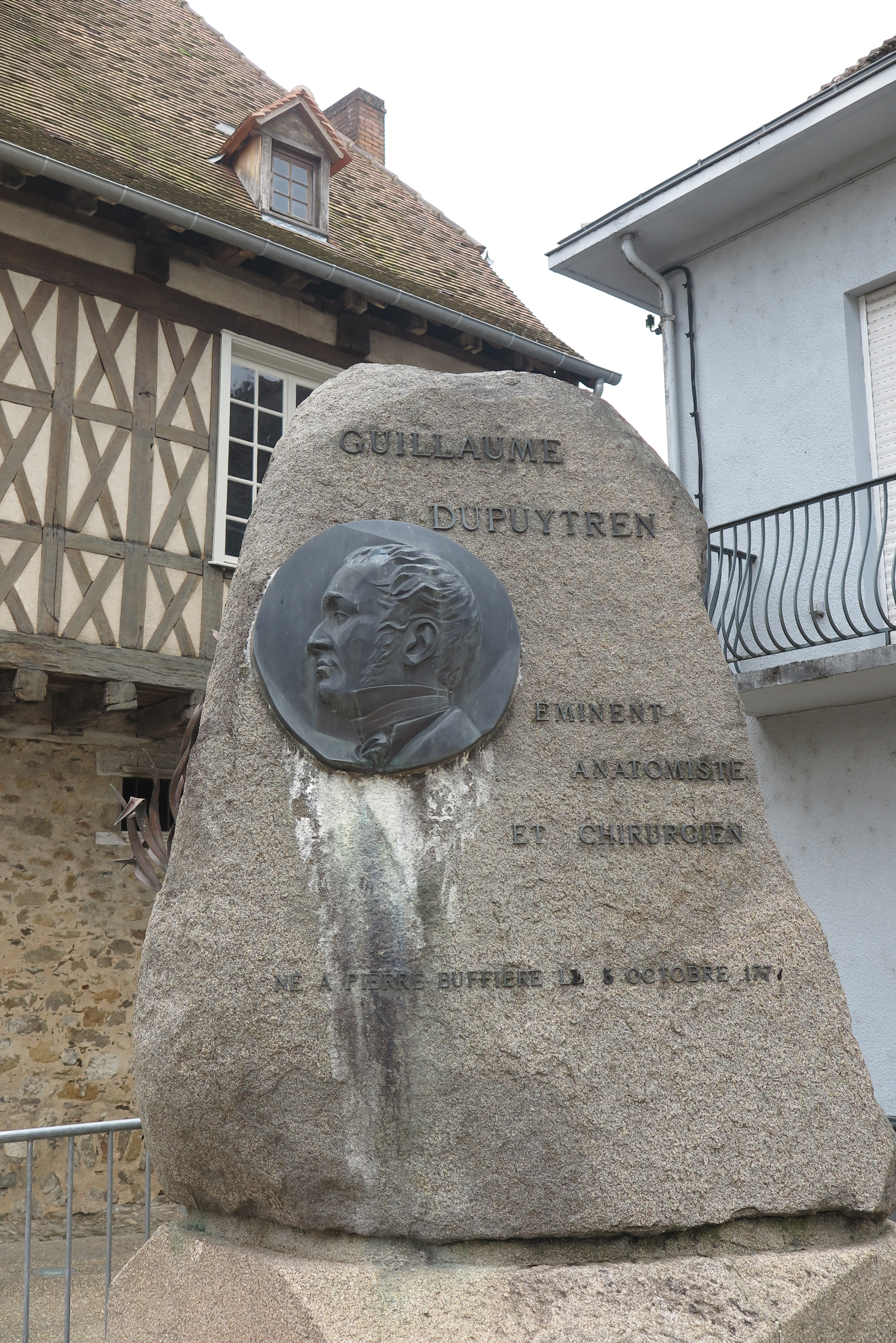
Dupuytren

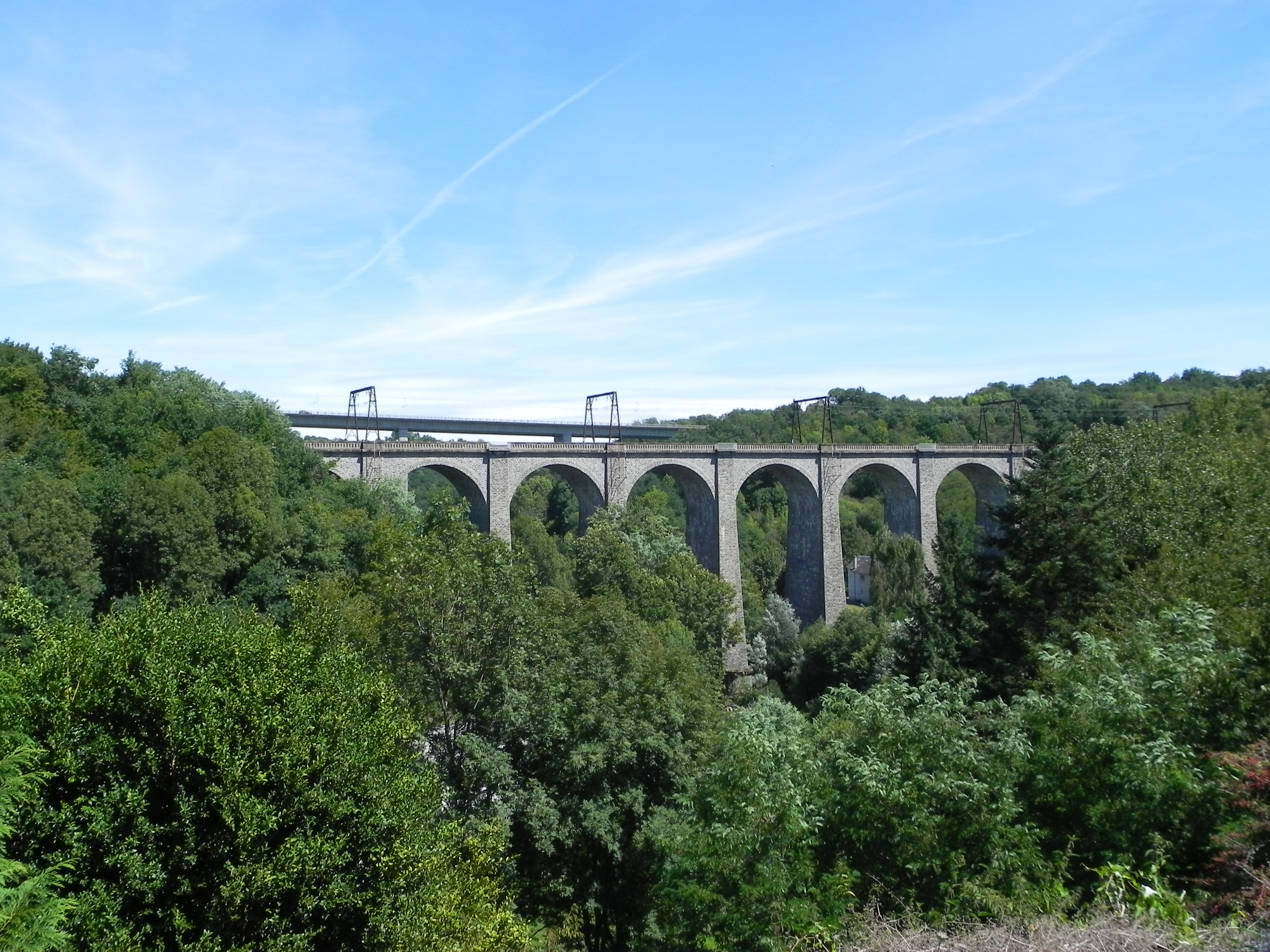
Train bridge

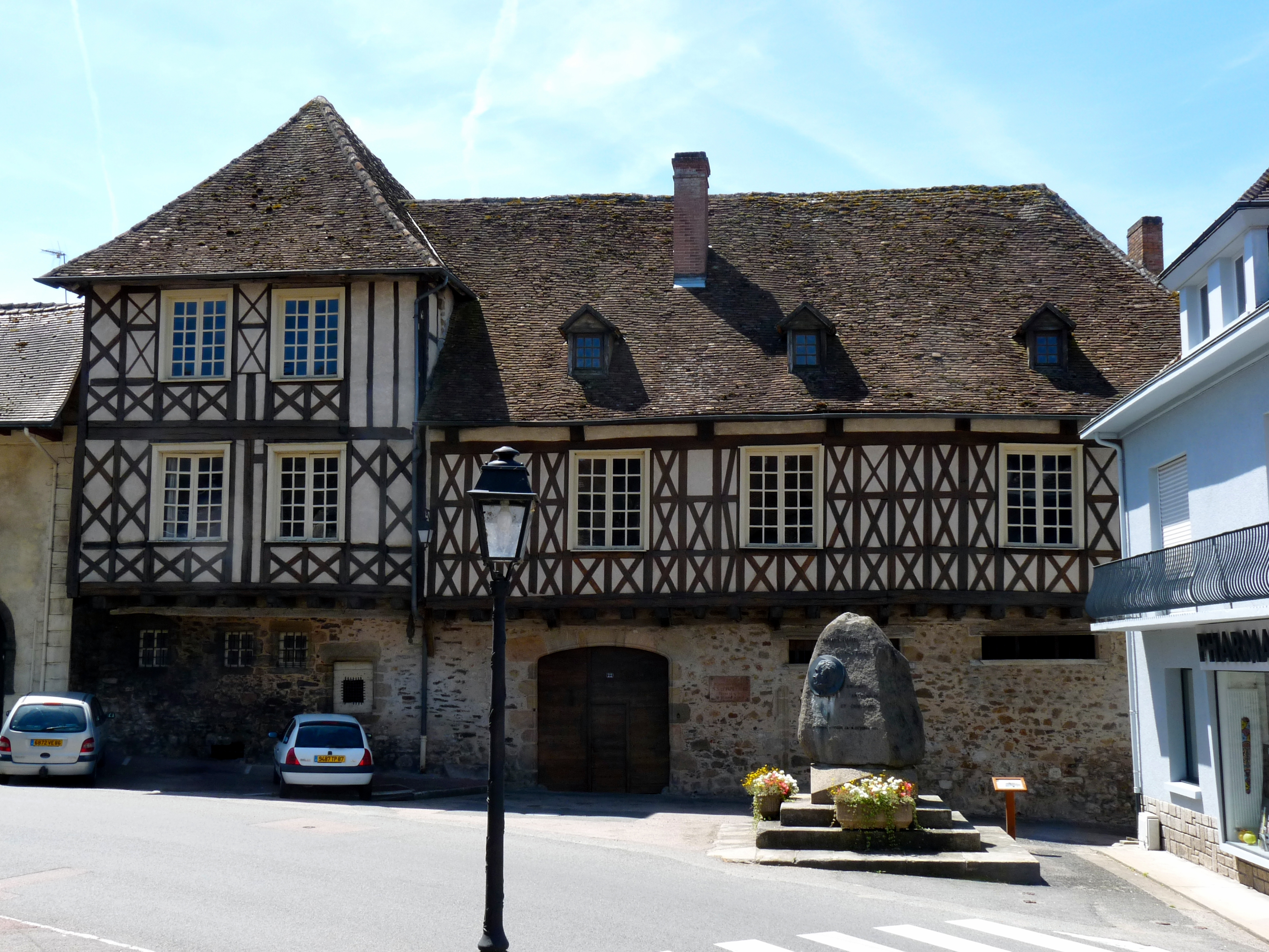
Hotel

== See also ==
- Communes of the Haute-Vienne department
