= Boisseuil =

- Commune
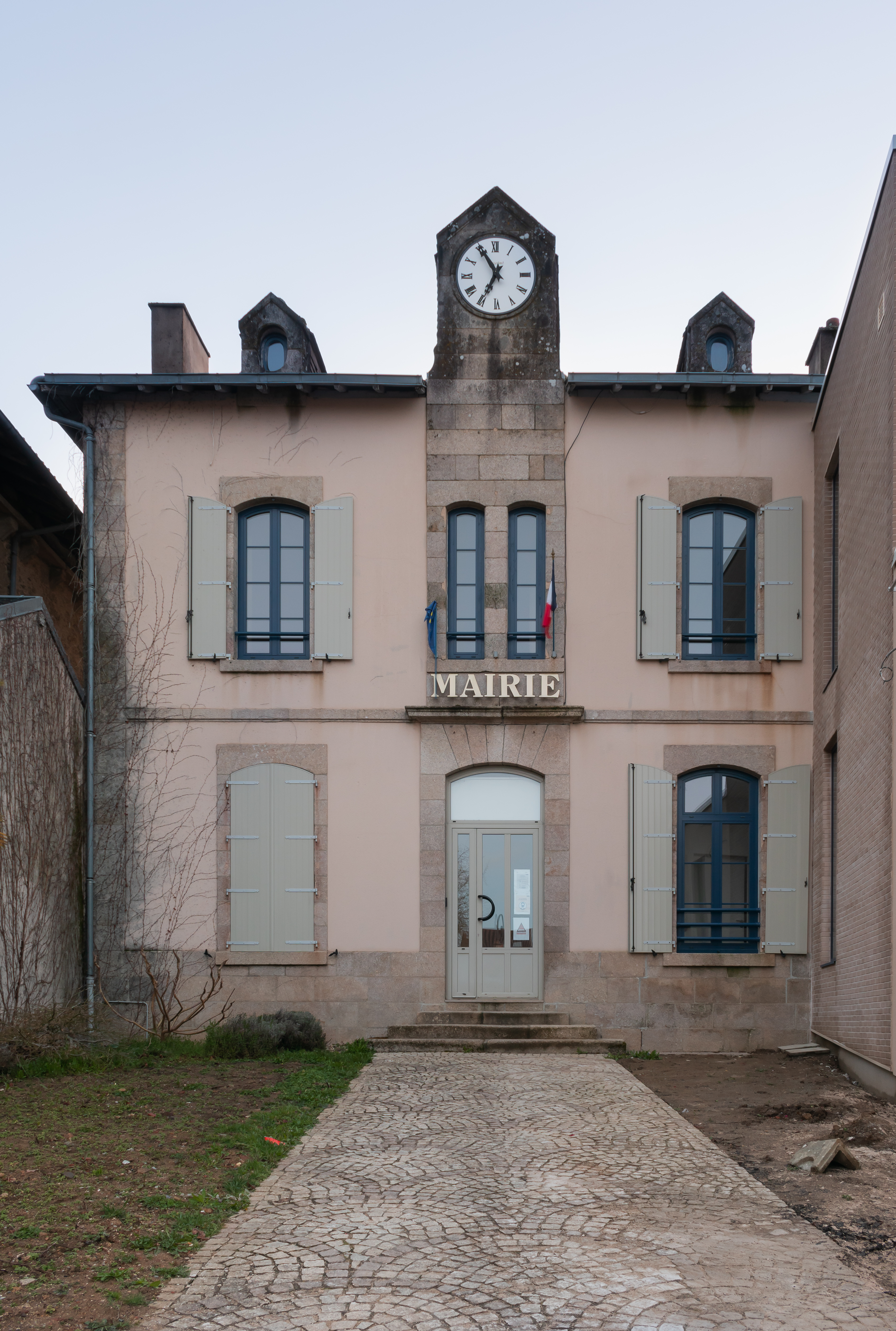
- The town hall in Boisseuil

- Coat of arms
- Location of Boisseuil
- Location within France Location within Nouvelle-Aquitaine
- Coordinates: 45°46′15″N 1°19′56″E
- Country: France
- Region: Nouvelle-Aquitaine
- Department: Haute-Vienne
- Arrondissement: Limoges
- Canton: Condat-sur-Vienne
- Intercommunality: CU Limoges Métropole

Government
  - Mayor (2020–2026): Philippe Janicot
- Area^{1}: 18.92 km^{2} (7.31 sq mi)
- Highest elevation: 403 m (1,322 ft)
- Lowest elevation: 223 m (732 ft)
- Population (2023): 3,010
  - Density: 159/km^{2} (412/sq mi)
- Time zone: UTC+01:00 (CET)
  - Summer (DST): UTC+02:00 (CEST)
- INSEE/Postal code: 87019 /87220
- ^{1} French Land Register data, which excludes lakes, ponds, glaciers > 1 km^{2} (0.386 sq mi or 247 acres) and river estuaries.

Boisseuil (French pronunciation: [bwasœj]; Occitan: Boissuelh) is a commune in the Haute-Vienne department in the Nouvelle-Aquitaine region in western France.

== Geography ==
The river Briance forms most of the commune's southern border.

== Population ==
Historical population
Year	Pop.	±% p.a.
1968	574	—
1975	838	+5.55%
1982	1,223	+5.55%
1990	1,558	+3.07%
1999	1,969	+2.64%
2007	2,463	+2.84%
2012	2,801	+2.61%
2017	2,928	+0.89%
2023	3,010	+0.46%
Source: INSEE

Inhabitants are known as Boisseuillais in French.

== See also ==
- Communes of the Haute-Vienne department
