= Eyjeaux =

- Commune
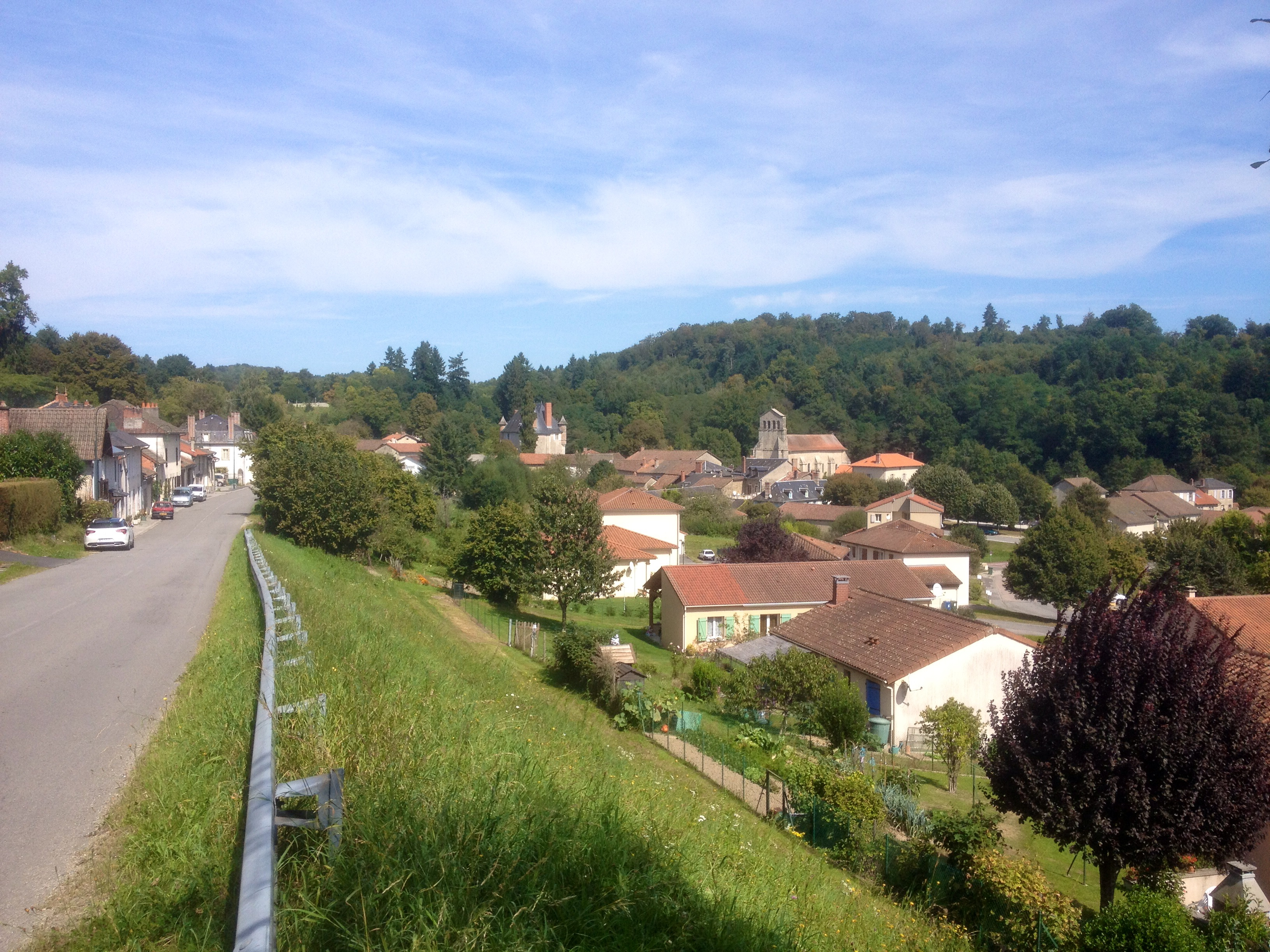
- A general view of the village of Eyjeaux
- Location of Eyjeaux
- Location within France Location within Nouvelle-Aquitaine
- Coordinates: 45°46′41″N 1°23′36″E
- Country: France
- Region: Nouvelle-Aquitaine
- Department: Haute-Vienne
- Arrondissement: Limoges
- Canton: Condat-sur-Vienne
- Intercommunality: CU Limoges Métropole

Government
  - Mayor (2020–2026): Jacques Roux
- Area^{1}: 24.23 km^{2} (9.36 sq mi)
- Highest elevation: 453 m (1,486 ft)
- Lowest elevation: 260 m (850 ft)
- Population (2023): 1,345
  - Density: 55.51/km^{2} (143.8/sq mi)
- Time zone: UTC+01:00 (CET)
  - Summer (DST): UTC+02:00 (CEST)
- INSEE/Postal code: 87063 /87220
- ^{1} French Land Register data, which excludes lakes, ponds, glaciers > 1 km^{2} (0.386 sq mi or 247 acres) and river estuaries.

Eyjeaux (French pronunciation: [eʒo]; Occitan: Esjau) is a commune in the Haute-Vienne department in the Nouvelle-Aquitaine region in western France. The current mayor is Jacques Roux.

== See also ==
- Communes of the Haute-Vienne department
