= Forstfeld =

Forstfeld Forschfald
- Commune
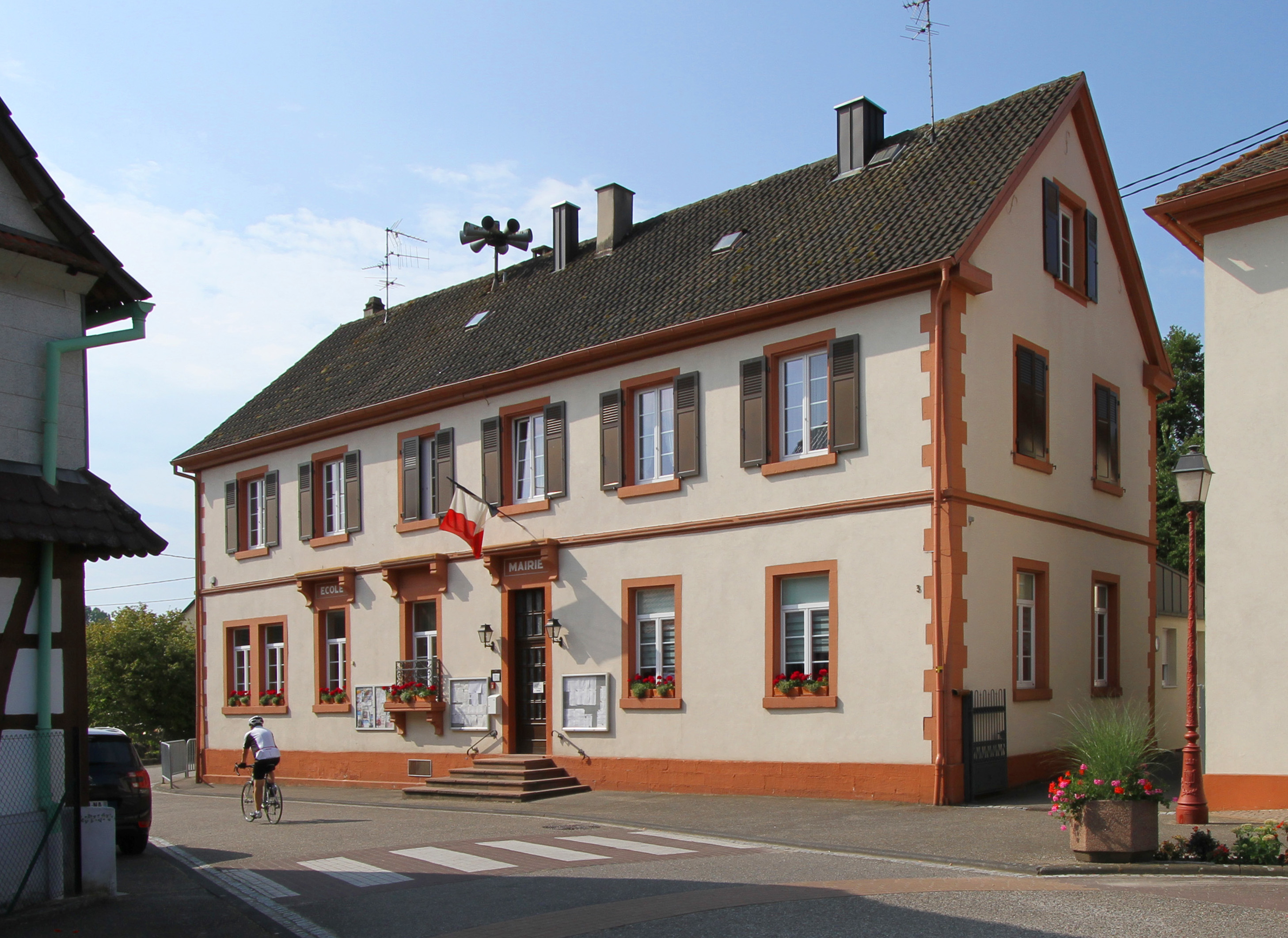
- The town hall in Forstfeld

- Coat of arms
- Location of Forstfeld
- Location within France Location within Grand Est
- Coordinates: 48°51′40″N 8°02′22″E
- Country: France
- Region: Grand Est
- Department: Bas-Rhin
- Arrondissement: Haguenau-Wissembourg
- Canton: Bischwiller

Government
  - Mayor (2020–2026): Philippe Boehmler
- Area^{1}: 4.9 km^{2} (1.9 sq mi)
- Highest elevation: 129 m (423 ft)
- Lowest elevation: 111 m (364 ft)
- Population (2023): 798
  - Density: 160/km^{2} (420/sq mi)
- Time zone: UTC+01:00 (CET)
  - Summer (DST): UTC+02:00 (CEST)
- INSEE/Postal code: 67140 /67480
- ^{1} French Land Register data, which excludes lakes, ponds, glaciers > 1 km^{2} (0.386 sq mi or 247 acres) and river estuaries.

Forstfeld (French pronunciation: [fɔʁstfɛld]; Alsatian: Forschfald) is a commune in the Bas-Rhin department in Grand Est in north-eastern France.

Between 1975 and 2019 the registered population increased from 456 to 754.

== Twin towns ==
- Condat-sur-Vienne

== See also ==
- Communes of the Bas-Rhin department
