= Queaux =

- Commune
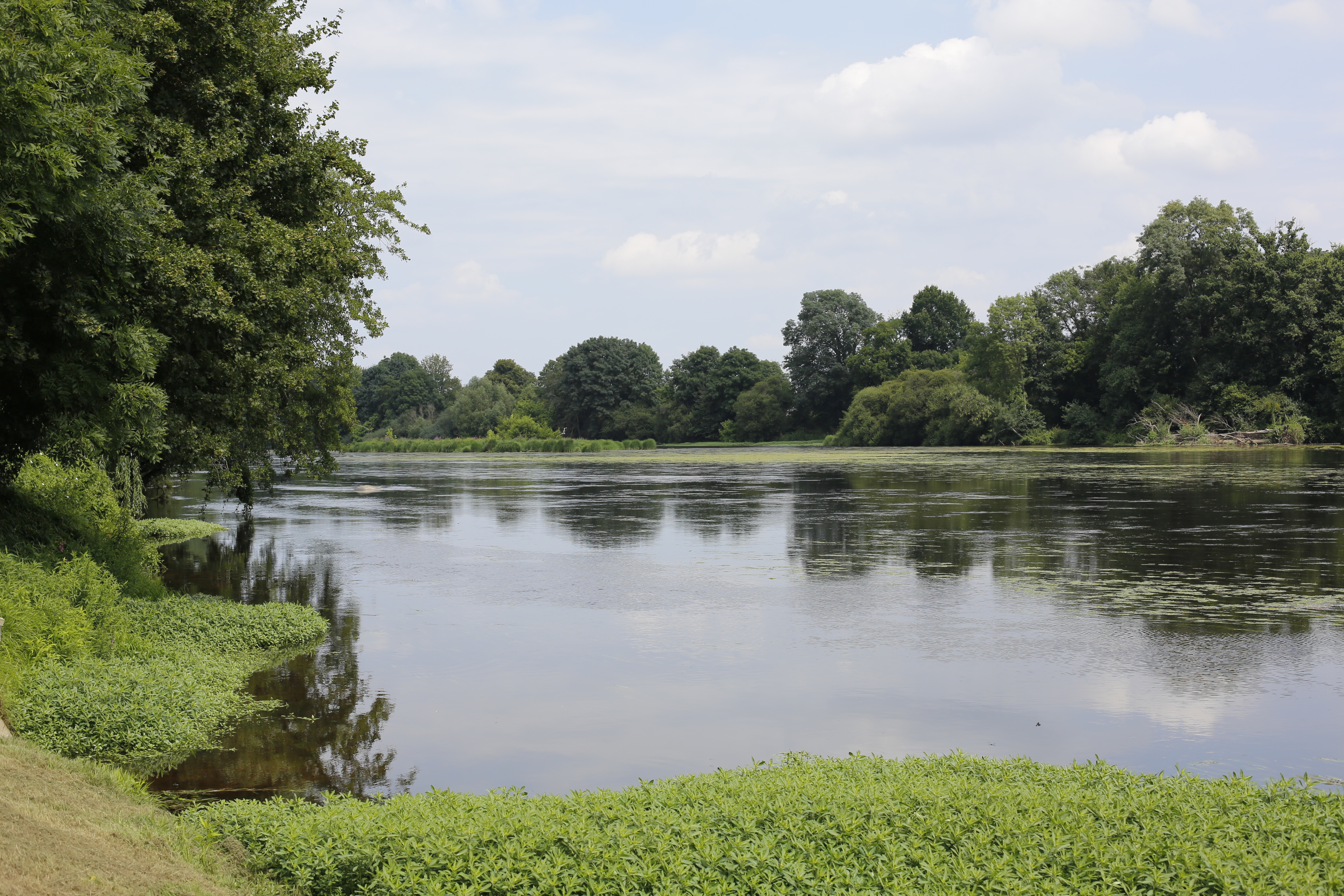
- The banks of the Vienne river, in Queaux
- Location of Queaux
- Location within France Location within Nouvelle-Aquitaine
- Coordinates: 46°19′40″N 0°40′07″E
- Country: France
- Region: Nouvelle-Aquitaine
- Department: Vienne
- Arrondissement: Montmorillon
- Canton: Lussac-les-Châteaux
- Intercommunality: Vienne et Gartempe

Government
  - Mayor (2020–2026): Gisèle Jean
- Area^{1}: 52.64 km^{2} (20.32 sq mi)
- Elevation: 113 m (371 ft)
- Highest elevation: 160 m (520 ft)
- Lowest elevation: 72 m (236 ft)
- Population (2023): 586
  - Density: 11.1/km^{2} (28.8/sq mi)
- Time zone: UTC+01:00 (CET)
  - Summer (DST): UTC+02:00 (CEST)
- INSEE/Postal code: 86203 /86150
- ^{1} French Land Register data, which excludes lakes, ponds, glaciers > 1 km^{2} (0.386 sq mi or 247 acres) and river estuaries.

Queaux (French pronunciation: [ko]) is a commune in the Vienne department in the Nouvelle-Aquitaine region in western France.

== Population ==
Historical population
| Year | Pop. | ±% p.a. |
|---|---|---|
| 1968 | 1,014 | — |
| 1975 | 880 | −2.00% |
| 1982 | 710 | −3.02% |
| 1990 | 603 | −2.02% |
| 1999 | 600 | −0.06% |
| 2007 | 599 | −0.02% |
| 2012 | 532 | −2.34% |
| 2017 | 524 | −0.30% |
| 2023 | 586 | +1.88% |
Source: INSEE

== See also ==
- Communes of the Vienne department
