= Saint-Paul, Haute-Vienne =

Saint-Paul
- Commune
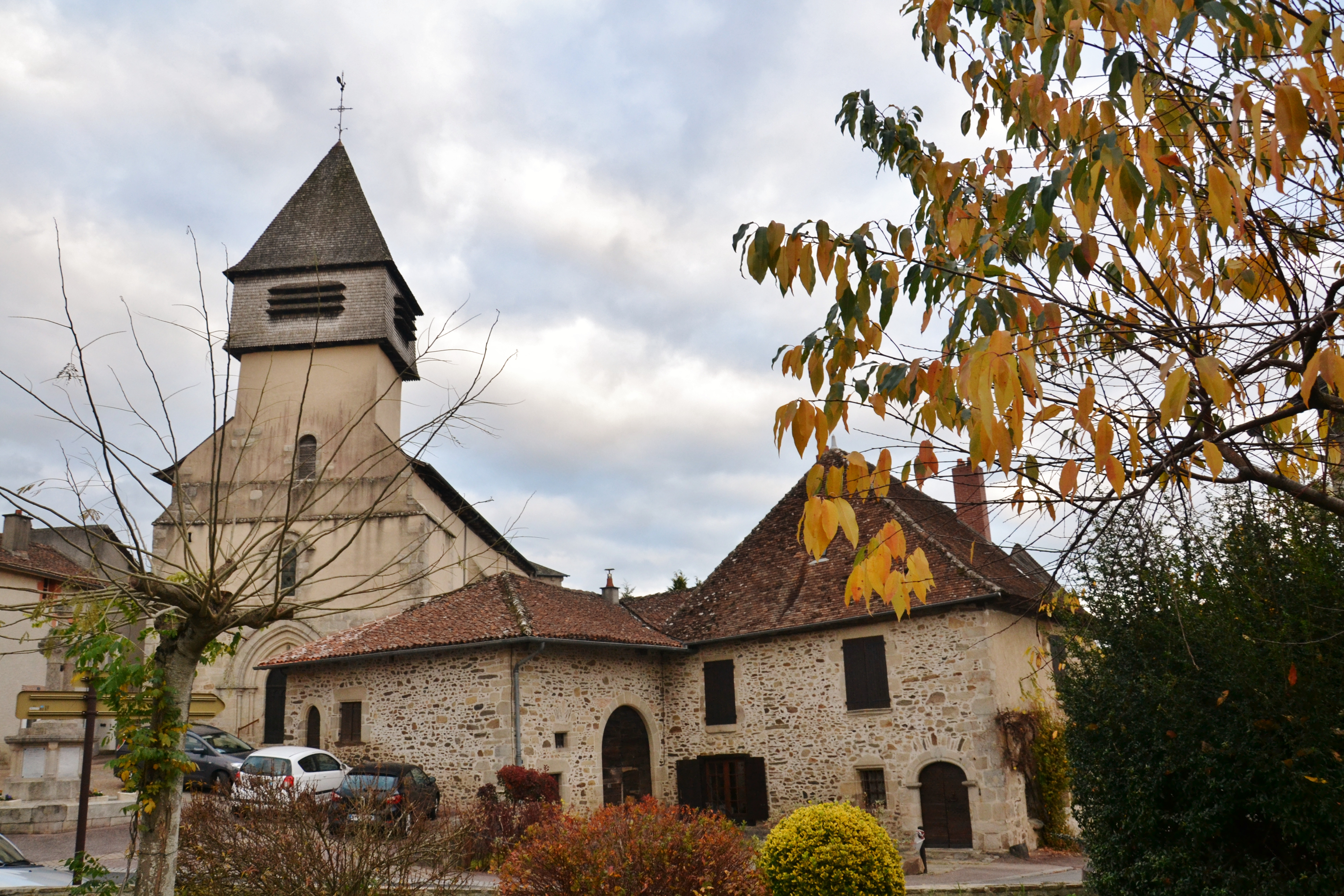
- The church in Saint-Paul

- Coat of arms
- Location of Saint-Paul
- Location within France Location within Nouvelle-Aquitaine
- Coordinates: 45°45′03″N 1°25′59″E
- Country: France
- Region: Nouvelle-Aquitaine
- Department: Haute-Vienne
- Arrondissement: Limoges
- Canton: Condat-sur-Vienne

Government
  - Mayor (2020–2026): Josiane Rouchut
- Area^{1}: 37.39 km^{2} (14.44 sq mi)
- Highest elevation: 460 m (1,510 ft)
- Lowest elevation: 276 m (906 ft)
- Population (2023): 1,235
  - Density: 33.03/km^{2} (85.55/sq mi)
- Time zone: UTC+01:00 (CET)
  - Summer (DST): UTC+02:00 (CEST)
- INSEE/Postal code: 87174 /87260
- ^{1} French Land Register data, which excludes lakes, ponds, glaciers > 1 km^{2} (0.386 sq mi or 247 acres) and river estuaries.

Saint-Paul (French pronunciation: [sɛ̃ pɔl]; Occitan: Sent Paul) is a commune in the Haute-Vienne department in the Nouvelle-Aquitaine region in west-central France.

Inhabitants are known as Saint-Paulais.

== See also ==
- Communes of the Haute-Vienne department
