= Saint-Jean-Ligoure =

- Commune
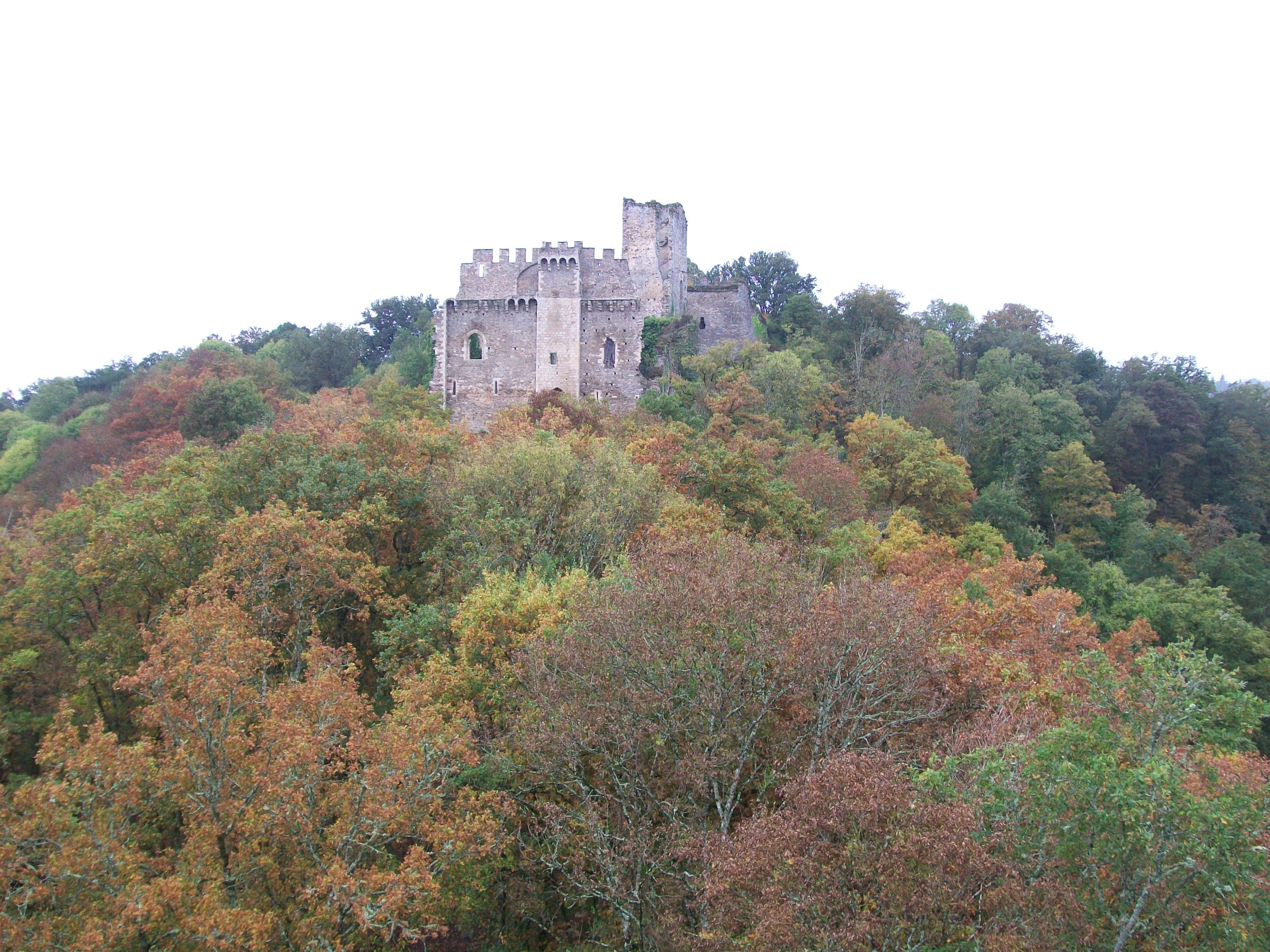
- The Chateau de Chalucet, in Saint-Jean-Ligoure
- Location of Saint-Jean-Ligoure
- Location within France Location within Nouvelle-Aquitaine
- Coordinates: 45°41′24″N 1°18′47″E
- Country: France
- Region: Nouvelle-Aquitaine
- Department: Haute-Vienne
- Arrondissement: Limoges
- Canton: Condat-sur-Vienne

Government
  - Mayor (2020–2026): Didier Marcellaud
- Area^{1}: 30.30 km^{2} (11.70 sq mi)
- Highest elevation: 395 m (1,296 ft)
- Lowest elevation: 226 m (741 ft)
- Population (2023): 505
  - Density: 16.7/km^{2} (43.2/sq mi)
- Time zone: UTC+01:00 (CET)
  - Summer (DST): UTC+02:00 (CEST)
- INSEE/Postal code: 87151 /87260
- ^{1} French Land Register data, which excludes lakes, ponds, glaciers > 1 km^{2} (0.386 sq mi or 247 acres) and river estuaries.

Saint-Jean-Ligoure (French pronunciation: [sɛ̃ ʒɑ̃ liɡuʁ]; Occitan: Sent Joan Ligora) is a commune in the Haute-Vienne department in the Nouvelle-Aquitaine region in west-central France.

== Geography ==
The river Briance forms all of the commune's northeastern border.

== See also ==
- Château de Châlucet
- Communes of the Haute-Vienne department
