= Saint-Bonnet-Briance =

- Commune
- Location of Saint-Bonnet-Briance
- Location within France Location within Nouvelle-Aquitaine
- Coordinates: 45°42′30″N 1°28′38″E
- Country: France
- Region: Nouvelle-Aquitaine
- Department: Haute-Vienne
- Arrondissement: Limoges
- Canton: Condat-sur-Vienne

Government
  - Mayor (2020–2026): Claude Reygnaud
- Area^{1}: 30.06 km^{2} (11.61 sq mi)
- Highest elevation: 459 m (1,506 ft)
- Lowest elevation: 310 m (1,020 ft)
- Population (2023): 531
  - Density: 17.7/km^{2} (45.8/sq mi)
- Time zone: UTC+01:00 (CET)
  - Summer (DST): UTC+02:00 (CEST)
- INSEE/Postal code: 87138 /87260
- ^{1} French Land Register data, which excludes lakes, ponds, glaciers > 1 km^{2} (0.386 sq mi or 247 acres) and river estuaries.

Saint-Bonnet-Briance (French pronunciation: [sɛ̃ bɔnɛ bʁijɑ̃s]; Limousin: Sent Bonet Briança) is a commune in the Haute-Vienne department in the Nouvelle-Aquitaine region in west-central France.

== Geography ==
The river Briance forms most of the commune's southern border.

== See also ==
- Communes of the Haute-Vienne department
