= Solignac =

- Commune
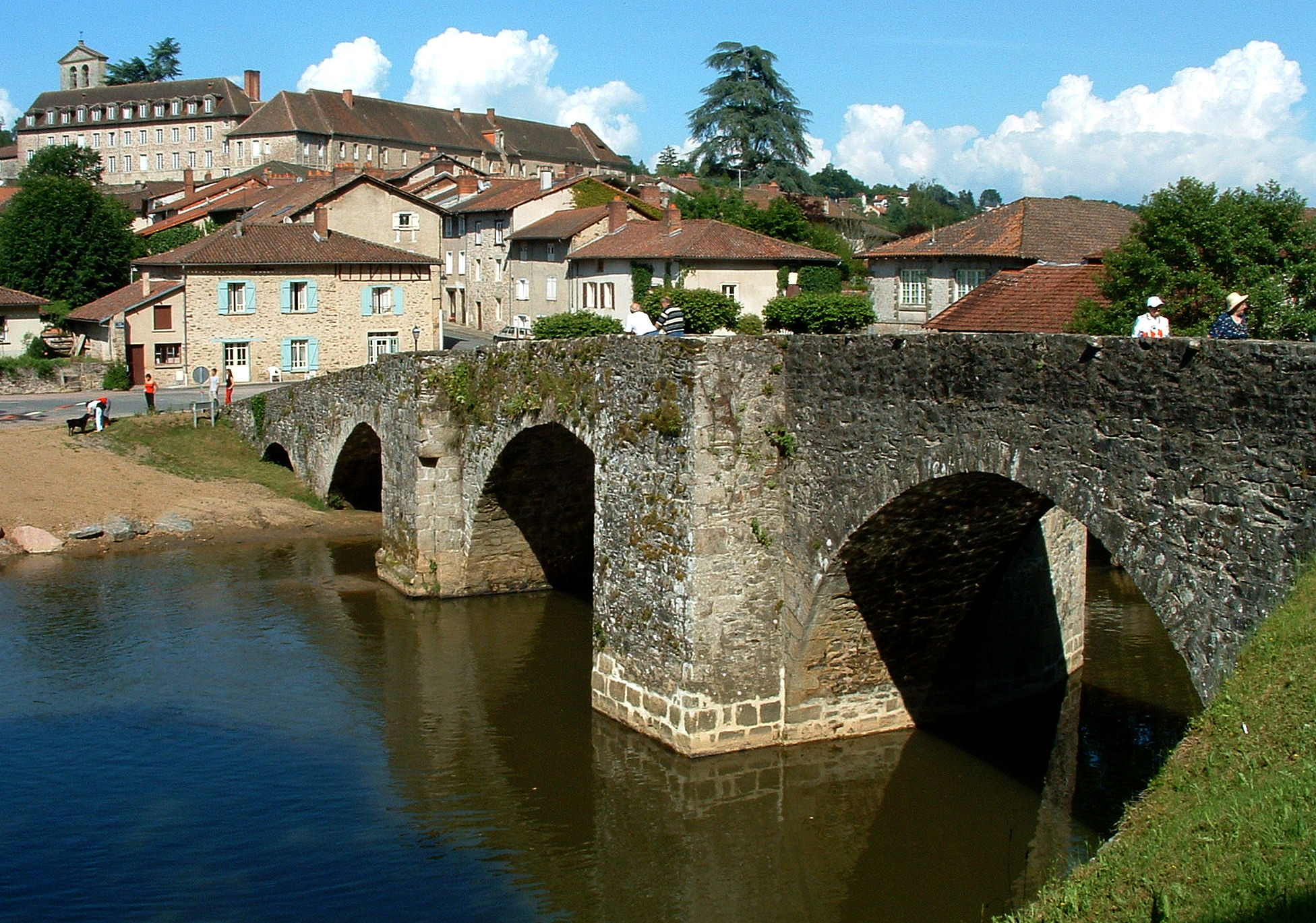
- The Romanesque bridge in Solignac, with the abbey and surrounding buildings beyond

- Coat of arms
- Location of Solignac
- Location within France Location within Nouvelle-Aquitaine
- Coordinates: 45°45′22″N 1°16′34″E
- Country: France
- Region: Nouvelle-Aquitaine
- Department: Haute-Vienne
- Arrondissement: Limoges
- Canton: Condat-sur-Vienne
- Intercommunality: CU Limoges Métropole

Government
  - Mayor (2020–2026): Alexandre Portheault
- Area^{1}: 16.54 km^{2} (6.39 sq mi)
- Highest elevation: 392 m (1,286 ft)
- Lowest elevation: 12 m (39 ft)
- Population (2023): 1,552
  - Density: 93.83/km^{2} (243.0/sq mi)
- Time zone: UTC+01:00 (CET)
  - Summer (DST): UTC+02:00 (CEST)
- INSEE/Postal code: 87192 /87110
- ^{1} French Land Register data, which excludes lakes, ponds, glaciers > 1 km^{2} (0.386 sq mi or 247 acres) and river estuaries.

Solignac (French pronunciation: [sɔliɲak]; Occitan: Solenhac) is a commune in the Haute-Vienne department in the Nouvelle-Aquitaine region in west-central France.

== Geography ==
The village lies on the right bank of the Briance, which flows westward through the commune. It contains the former Abbey of Solignac, part of the Benedictine order; founded in 631 and rebuilt several times, the current buildings date from the 17th century. Suppressed during the French Revolution and used as a porcelain factory until 1931, the former Abbey church is known as an exceptional example of Romanesque architecture and has been designated a National Historic Monument. On 1 August 2021 the community of Benedictine monks returned to the abbey and will be an active religious site once again.

Solignac-Le Vigen station has rail connections to Brive-la-Gaillarde and Limoges. Inhabitants are known as Solignacois in French.

== Personalities ==
- St Ramaclus, 7th-century monk who was the first abbot at Solignac Abbey.
- Joseph Brousseau, French architect probably born at Solignac around 1733 and died at Sées in the Orne on 5 February 1797.
- Georges d'Aubusson de La Feuillade (1609-1697), later Bishop of Embrun and Bishop of Metz was a member and later Abbot of Solignac Abbey, from 1639 to 1649;

== See also ==
- Communes of the Haute-Vienne department
