= Condat-sur-Vienne =

- Commune
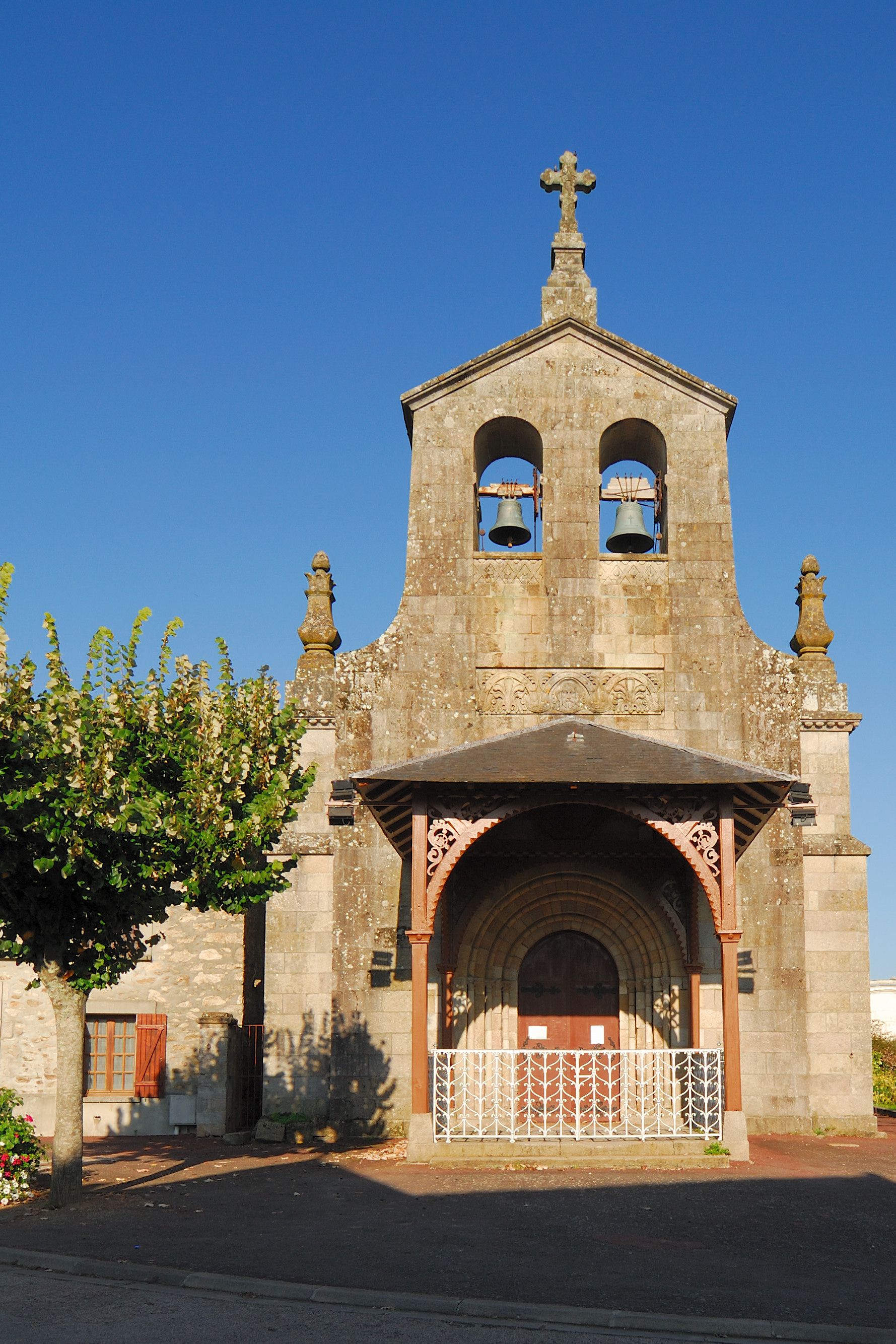
- The church in Condat-sur-Vienne
- Location of Condat-sur-Vienne
- Location within France Location within Nouvelle-Aquitaine
- Coordinates: 45°47′38″N 1°13′57″E
- Country: France
- Region: Nouvelle-Aquitaine
- Department: Haute-Vienne
- Arrondissement: Limoges
- Canton: Condat-sur-Vienne
- Intercommunality: CU Limoges Métropole

Government
  - Mayor (2020–2026): Émilie Rabeteau
- Area^{1}: 15.47 km^{2} (5.97 sq mi)
- Highest elevation: 351 m (1,152 ft)
- Lowest elevation: 210 m (690 ft)
- Population (2023): 5,281
  - Density: 341.4/km^{2} (884.1/sq mi)
- Time zone: UTC+01:00 (CET)
  - Summer (DST): UTC+02:00 (CEST)
- INSEE/Postal code: 87048 /87920
- ^{1} French Land Register data, which excludes lakes, ponds, glaciers > 1 km^{2} (0.386 sq mi or 247 acres) and river estuaries.

Condat-sur-Vienne (French pronunciation: [kɔ̃da syʁ vjɛn], literally Condat on Vienne; Occitan: Condat) is a commune in the Haute-Vienne department in the Nouvelle-Aquitaine region in western France.

== Geography ==
The river Briance forms most of the commune's southern border, then flows into the Vienne, which forms all of its western border.

== Population ==
Inhabitants are known as Condatois in French.

Historical population
Year	Pop.	±% p.a.
1968	1,458	—
1975	2,108	+5.41%
1982	3,509	+7.55%
1990	4,090	+1.93%
1999	4,249	+0.42%
2007	4,667	+1.18%
2012	4,779	+0.48%
2017	5,150	+1.51%
2023	5,281	+0.42%
Source: INSEE

== Twin towns ==
- Forstfeld, Alsace
- Cilavegna, Lombardy

== See also ==
- Communes of the Haute-Vienne department
