= Solignac–Le Vigen station =

Railway station in Le Vigen, France

Coordinates: 45°45′23″N 1°17′09″E

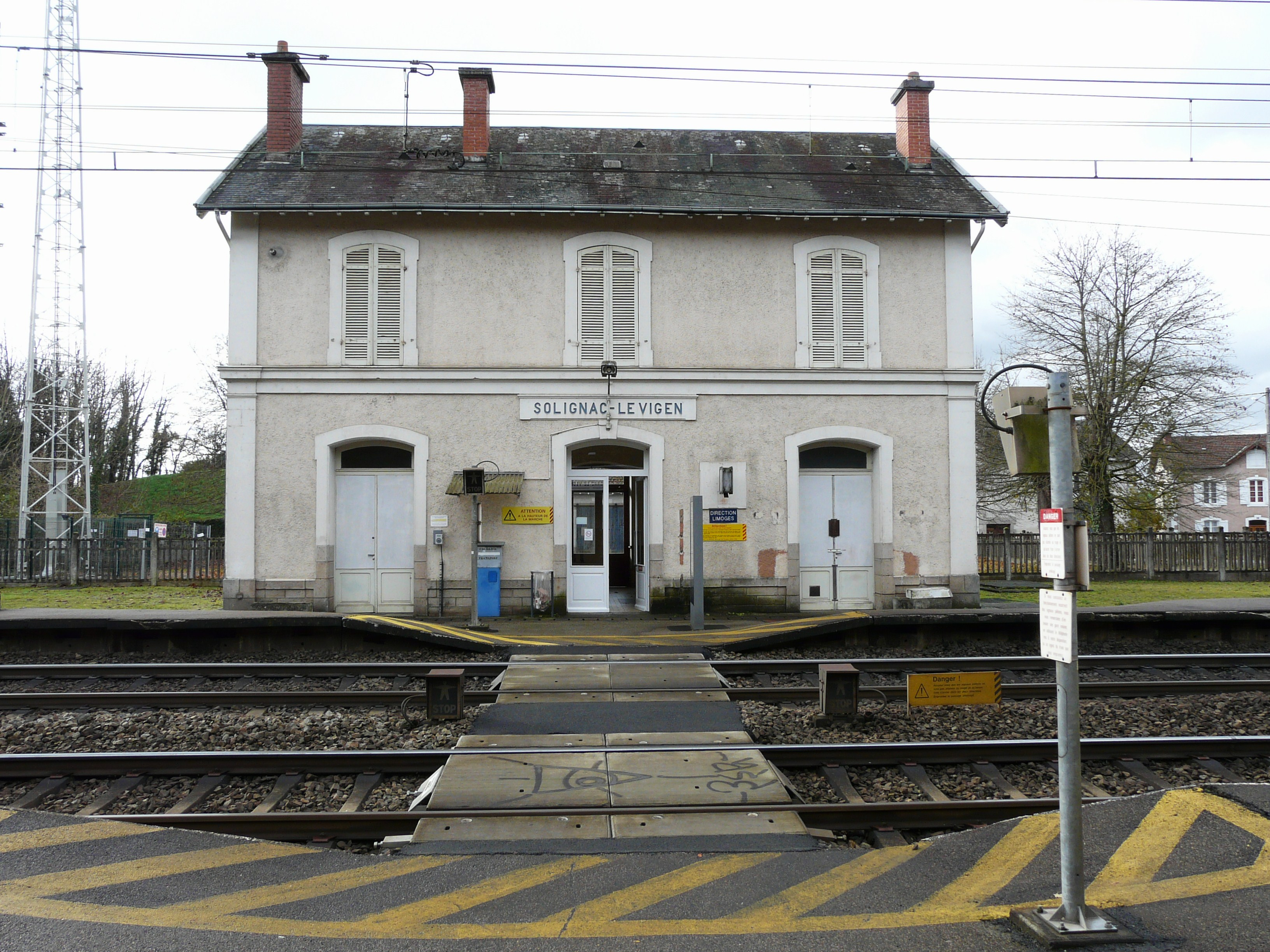
Solignac-Le Vigen station

Solignac–Le Vigen is a railway station serving Solignac and Le Vigen, Nouvelle-Aquitaine, France. The station opened on 1 July 1893 and is located on the Orléans–Montauban railway line. The station is served by TER (local) services operated by SNCF.

== Train services ==
The following services currently call at Solignac-Le Vigen:

- local service (TER Nouvelle-Aquitaine) Limoges - Uzerche - Brive-la-Gaillarde

Preceding station	TER Nouvelle-Aquitaine	Following station
Limoges Terminus	22	Pierre-Buffière towards Brive-la-Gaillarde
