= Briance =

River in central France

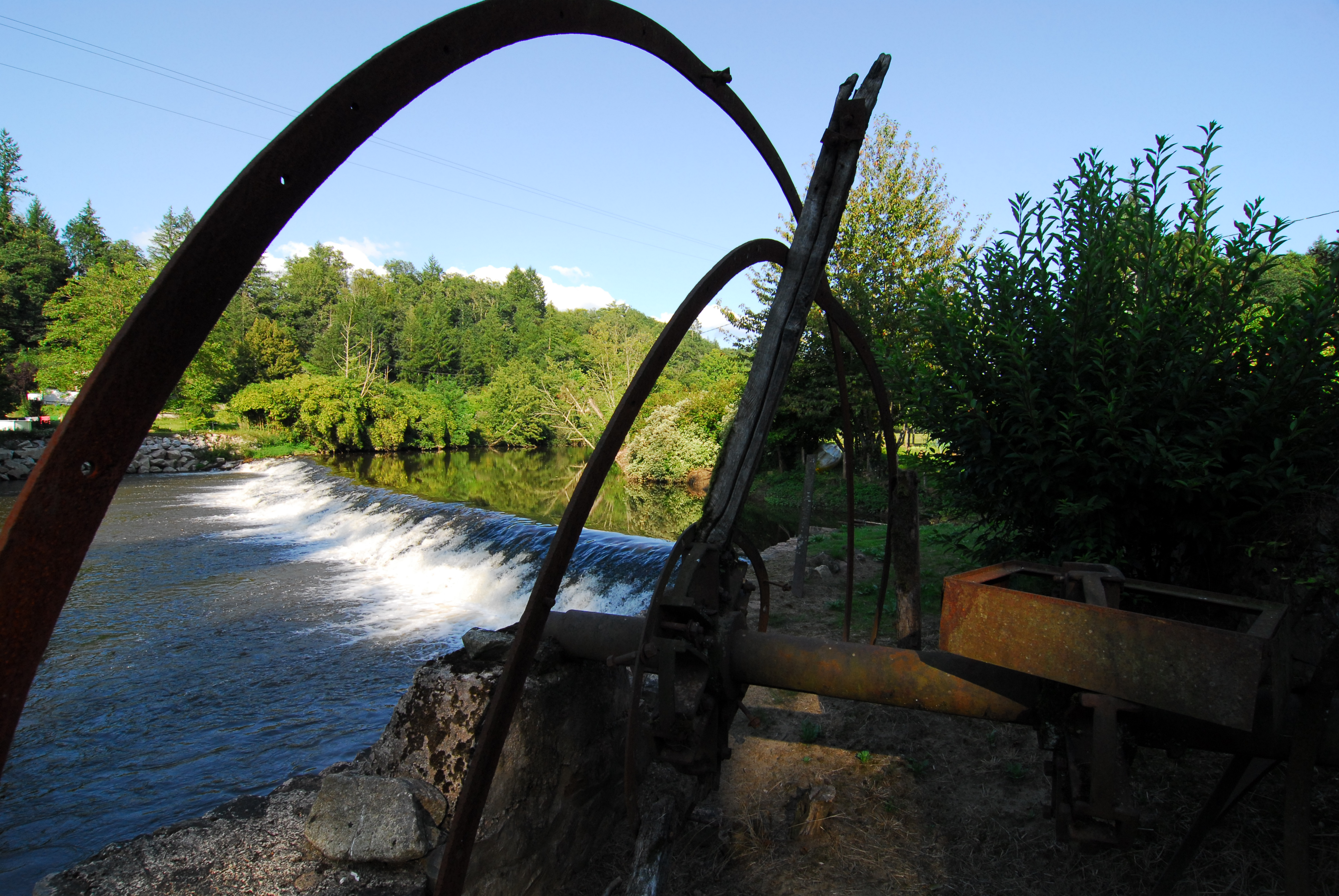
- The Briance

- Location within France Location within Nouvelle-Aquitaine

Location
- Country: France

Physical characteristics
- Source
  - location: La Croisille-sur-Briance
  - coordinates: 45°35′39″N 01°38′06″E
  - elevation: 540 m (1,770 ft)
- Mouth
  - location: Vienne
  - coordinates: 45°46′54″N 01°12′15″E
  - elevation: 205 m (673 ft)
- Length: 57.7 km (35.9 mi)
- Basin size: 597 km^{2} (231 sq mi)
- Discharge
  - average: 8.17 m^{3}/s (289 cu ft/s)

Basin features
- Progression: Vienne→ Loire→ Atlantic Ocean

The Briance (French pronunciation: [bʁijɑ̃s]; Occitan: Briança) is a 57.7 km (35.9 mi) long river in the Haute-Vienne département, central France. Its source is at La Croisille-sur-Briance. It flows generally northwest. It is a left tributary of the Vienne into which it flows between Condat-sur-Vienne and Bosmie-l'Aiguille.

== Communes along its course ==
This list is ordered from source to mouth: La Croisille-sur-Briance, Saint-Vitte-sur-Briance, Saint-Méard, Linards, Glanges, Saint-Bonnet-Briance, Saint-Genest-sur-Roselle, Vicq-sur-Breuilh, Saint-Hilaire-Bonneval, Pierre-Buffière, Saint-Jean-Ligoure, Boisseuil, Le Vigen, Solignac, Condat-sur-Vienne, Jourgnac, Bosmie-l'Aiguille
