= Vienne (river) =

River in west-central France

Vienne Vinhana (Occitan)
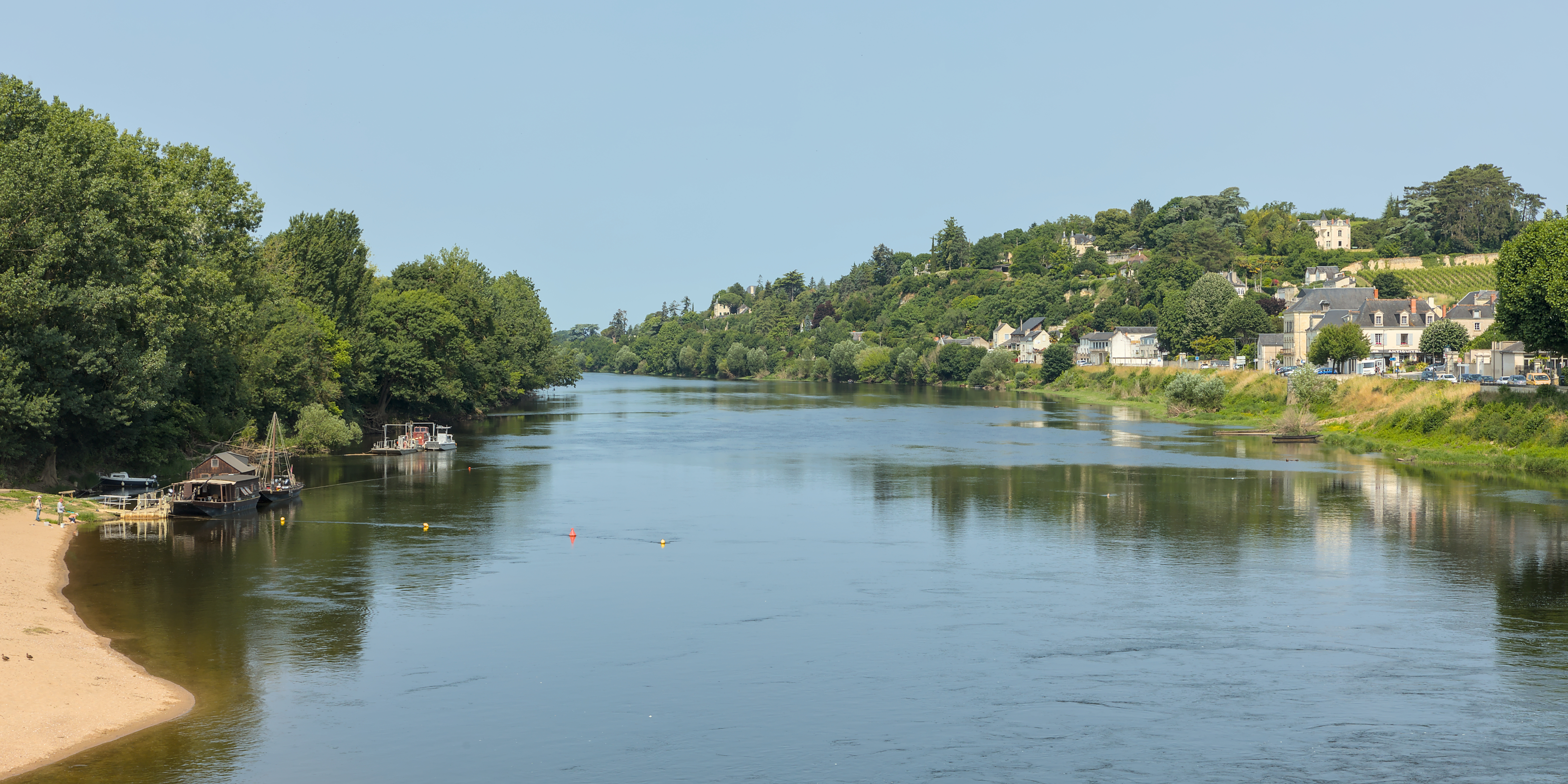
- The Vienne in Chinon

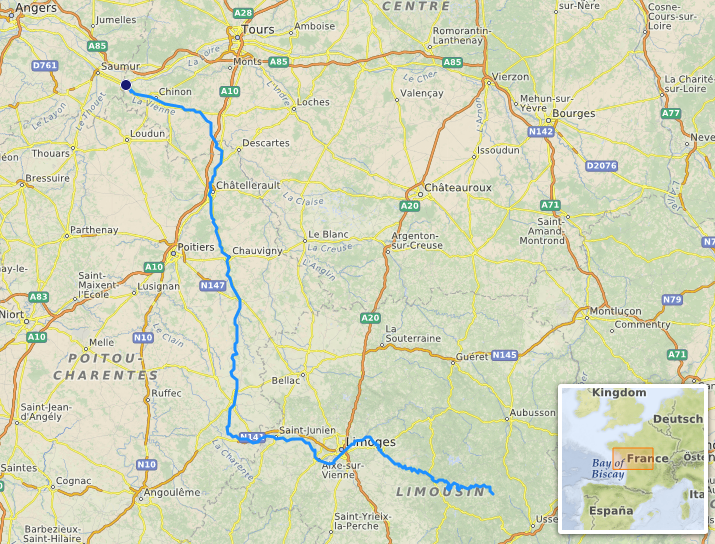

Location
- Country: France

Physical characteristics
- Source
  - location: Plateau de Millevaches
  - elevation: 880 m (2,890 ft)
- Mouth
  - location: Loire
  - coordinates: 47°12′45″N 0°4′31″E
- Length: 363 km (226 mi)
- Basin size: 21,105 km^{2} (8,149 sq mi)
- Discharge
  - average: 203 m^{3}/s (7,200 cu ft/s)

Basin features
- Progression: Loire→ Atlantic Ocean

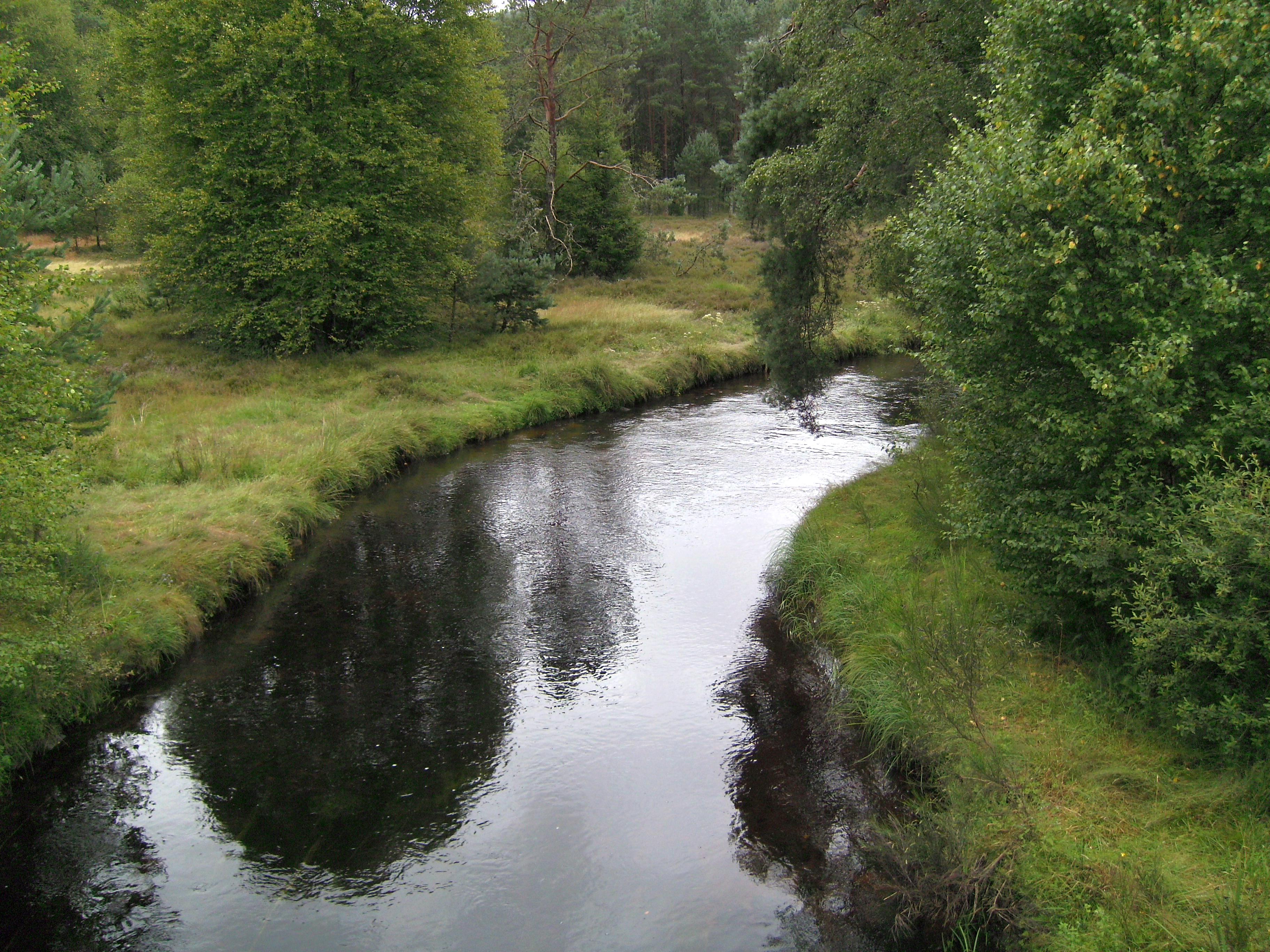
The Vienne in a wooded landscape near Peyrelevade, close to its source on the Millevaches Massif

The Vienne (French pronunciation: [vjɛn]; Occitan: Vinhana, pronounced [viɲaˈno]) is a major river in south-western France. It is 363 km (226 mi) long. It is a significant left tributary of the lower Loire. It supports numerous hydroelectric dams, and it is the main river of the northern part of the Nouvelle-Aquitaine region.

Two French departments are named after the Vienne: Haute-Vienne (87) in the Limousin region and Vienne (86) both in the Nouvelle-Aquitaine region.

== Course ==
The Vienne rises as a spring in the department of Corrèze, at the foot of Mont Audouze, on the Plateau de Millevaches, near Peyrelevade. It then flows roughly west to the city of Limoges where it once played a major role in the famous Limoges porcelain industry. A little way after Limoges it turn to the north. En route to its confluence with the Loire, the Vienne is joined by the rivers Creuse and Clain. Finally, after a journey of 372 km it reaches the Loire at Candes-Saint-Martin in the department of Indre-et-Loire.

The Vienne flows through the following departments and towns:

- Corrèze: Peyrelevade
- Creuse
- Haute-Vienne: Eymoutiers, Saint-Léonard-de-Noblat, Limoges, Aixe-sur-Vienne, Saint-Junien
- Charente: Chabanais, Confolens
- Vienne: L'Isle-Jourdain, Lussac-les-Châteaux, Chauvigny, Châtellerault
- Indre-et-Loire: L'Île-Bouchard, Chinon

Tributaries include:

- The Creuse, which joins the Vienne north of Châtellerault
- The Clain, which flows through the city of Poitiers, and joins the Vienne in Châtellerault
- The Briance, which joins the Vienne in Condat-sur-Vienne
- The Taurion, which joins the Vienne north of Saint-Priest-Taurion
