= List of populated places in Gaziantep Province =

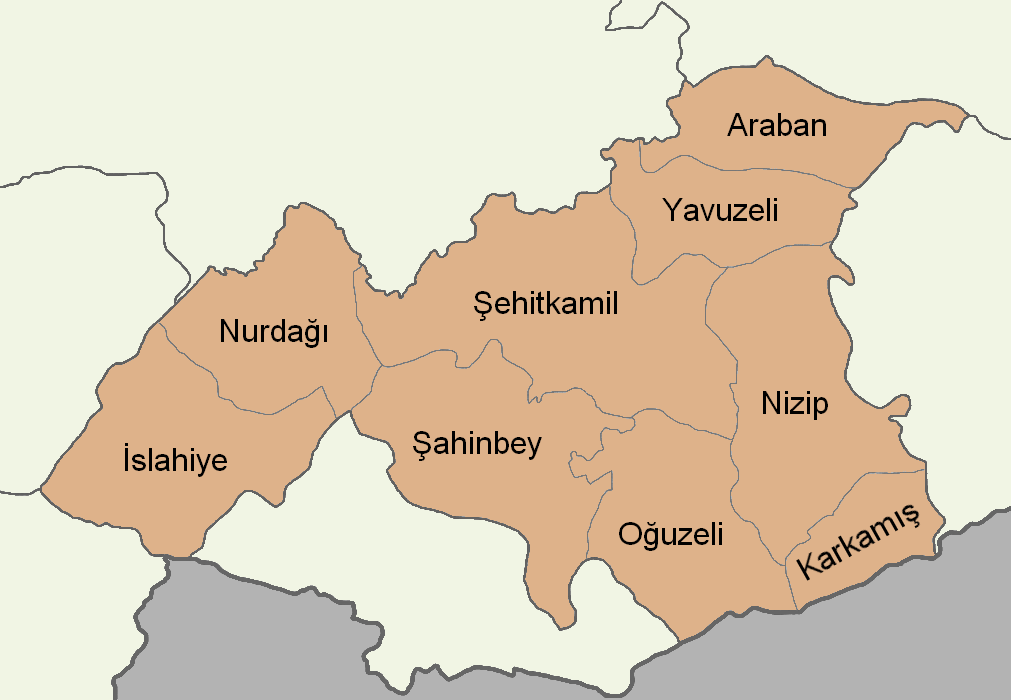
Gaziantep Province with its districts

Below is the list of populated places in Gaziantep Province, Turkey by district. The first two districts, Şahinbey and Şehitkamil, are parts of Gaziantep Province. The first place in each list is the administrative center of the district.

== Şahinbey ==
- Şahinbey
- Akbayır, Şahinbey
- Akyazı, Şahinbey
- Almalı, Şahinbey
- Bekişli, Şahinbey
- Belenköy, Şahinbey
- Beşkuyu, Şahinbey
- Bozca, Şahinbey
- Cevizli, Şahinbey
- Çapalı, Şahinbey
- Çevreli, Şahinbey
- Çimenli, Şahinbey
- Çöreklik, Şahinbey
- Çubukdiken, Şahinbey
- Doğanca, Şahinbey
- Dokur, Şahinbey
- Ekinli, Şahinbey
- Gerciğin, Şahinbey
- Gülpınar, Şahinbey
- Güllüce, Şahinbey
- Hacıarslan, Şahinbey
- Hacıköprü, Şahinbey
- Hacıköy, Şahinbey
- Kapçağız, Şahinbey
- Kavşak, Şahinbey
- Kayakent, Şahinbey
- Kazıklı, Şahinbey
- Killik, Şahinbey
- Kumruhamurkesen, Şahinbey
- Kuşçu, Şahinbey
- Külecik, Şahinbey
- Kürüm, Şahinbey
- Morcalı, Şahinbey
- Narlıca, Şahinbey
- Ortaklar, Şahinbey
- Ozanlı, Şahinbey
- Pancarlı, Şahinbey
- Sarıkaya, Şahinbey
- Sırasöğüt, Şahinbey
- Şahinbey Mülk, Şahinbey
- Tiyekli, Şahinbey
- Töreli, Şahinbey
- Türközü, Şahinbey
- Ufacık, Şahinbey
- Uğurtepe, Şahinbey
- Yamaçtepe, Şahinbey
- Yaycı, Şahinbey
- Yaylacık, Şahinbey
- Yeniköy, Şahinbey
- Yeşilköy, Şahinbey
- Yığmatepe, Şahinbey
- Yoğuntaş, Şahinbey
- Zeytinli, Şahinbey

== Şehitkamil ==
- Şehitkamil
- Acaroba, Şehitkamil
- Ağaçlıboyno, Şehitkamil
- Akçaburç, Şehitkamil
- Akçagöze, Şehitkamil
- Atalar, Şehitkamil
- Bağbaşı, Şehitkamil
- Battal, Şehitkamil
- Bayatlı, Şehitkamil
- Bedirköy, Şehitkamil
- Beyreli, Şehitkamil
- Bozobası, Şehitkamil
- Çağkuyu, Şehitkamil
- Cerityeniyapan, Şehitkamil
- Durnalık, Şehitkamil
- Dülük, Şehitkamil
- Dündarlı, Şehitkamil
- Eskişarkaya, Şehitkamil
- Günbulur, Şehitkamil
- Güngürge, Şehitkamil
- İncesu, Şehitkamil
- İskenderli, Şehitkamil
- Kabasakız, Şehitkamil
- Karacaören, Şehitkamil
- Karakesek, Şehitkamil
- Karayusuflu, Şehitkamil
- Karpuzkaya, Şehitkamil
- Serintepe, Şehitkamil
- Koçlu, Şehitkamil
- Köksalan, Şehitkamil
- Medegöz, Şehitkamil
- Öğümsöğüt, Şehitkamil
- Övündük, Şehitkamil
- Büyükpınar, Şehitkamil
- Sarılar, Şehitkamil
- Seymenli, Şehitkamil
- Sofalıcı, Şehitkamil
- Suboğazı, Şehitkamil
- Sülüklü, Şehitkamil
- Tekirsin, Şehitkamil
- Tokdemir, Şehitkamil
- Türkyurdu, Şehitkamil
- Uğruca, Şehitkamil
- Üçgöze, Şehitkamil
- Ülkerli, Şehitkamil
- Yalankoz, Şehitkamil
- Yamaçoba, Şehitkamil
- Yayıktaş, Şehitkamil
- Yenişarkaya, Şehitkamil
- Yeşilce, Şehitkamil
- Yığınlı, Şehitkamil

== Araban ==
- Araban
- Akbudak, Araban
- Akkoç, Araban
- Altınpınar, Araban
- Aşağıkaravaiz, Araban
- Aşağıyufkalı, Araban
- Başpınar, Araban
- Beydili, Araban
- Çiftekoz, Araban
- Dağdancık, Araban
- Doğan, Araban
- Elif, Araban
- Erenbağ, Araban
- Emirhaydar, Araban
- Esentepe, Araban
- Eskialtıntaş, Araban
- Fakılı, Araban
- Fıstıklıdağ, Araban
- Gelinbuğday, Araban
- Gökçepayam, Araban
- Güzey, Araban
- Güllüce, Araban
- Gümüşpınar, Araban
- Hasanoğlu, Araban
- Hisar, Araban
- Karababa, Araban
- Karacaören, Araban
- Köklüce, Araban
- Körhacıobası, Araban
- Küçüklü, Araban
- Muratlı, Araban
- Nurettin, Araban
- Sarıkaya, Araban
- Sarıtepe, Araban
- Tarlabaşı, Araban
- Taşdeğirmen, Araban
- Yaylacık, Araban
- Yolveren, Araban
- Yukarıkaravaiz, Araban
- Yukarıyufkalı, Araban
- Ziyaret, Araban

== İslahiye ==
- İslahiye
- Ağabey, İslahiye
- Ağalarobası, İslahiye
- Akınyolu, İslahiye
- Alaca, İslahiye
- Altınüzüm, İslahiye
- Arpalı, İslahiye
- Şerikanlı, İslahiye
- Bayraktepe, İslahiye
- Boğaziçi, İslahiye
- Burunsuzlar, İslahiye
- Çerçili, İslahiye
- Çınarlı, İslahiye
- Çolaklar, İslahiye
- Çubuk, İslahiye
- Değirmencik, İslahiye
- Elbistanhüyüğü, İslahiye
- Esenler, İslahiye
- Fevzipaşa, İslahiye
- Güllühüyük, İslahiye
- Güngören, İslahiye
- Hanağzı, İslahiye
- Hasanlök, İslahiye
- İdilli, İslahiye
- Kabaklar, İslahiye
- Kalaycık, İslahiye
- Kale, İslahiye
- Karacaören, İslahiye
- Karakaya, İslahiye
- Karapınar, İslahiye
- Karapolat, İslahiye
- Kayabaşı, İslahiye
- Kazıklı, İslahiye
- Kırıkçalı, İslahiye
- Koçcağız, İslahiye
- Kozdere, İslahiye
- Köklü, İslahiye
- Kuşçumustafa, İslahiye
- Ortaklı, İslahiye
- Örtülü, İslahiye
- Sulumağara, İslahiye
- Şahmaran, İslahiye
- Tandır, İslahiye
- Telli, İslahiye
- Türkbahçe, İslahiye
- Yağızlar, İslahiye
- Yelliburun, İslahiye
- Yeniceli, İslahiye
- Yeniköy, İslahiye
- Yesemek, İslahiye
- Yeşilova, İslahiye
- Yeşilyurt, İslahiye
- Yolbaşı, İslahiye
- Yukarıbilenler, İslahiye
- Zincirli, İslahiye

== Karkamış ==
- Karkamış
- Akçaköy, Karkamış
- Alaçalı, Karkamış
- Alagöz, Karkamış
- Arıkdere, Karkamış
- Ayyıldız, Karkamış
- Balaban, Karkamış
- Beşkılıç, Karkamış
- Çiftlik, Karkamış
- Eceler, Karkamış
- Elifoğlu, Karkamış
- Erenyolu, Karkamış
- Gürçay, Karkamış
- Karacurun, Karkamış
- Karanfil, Karkamış
- Kelekli, Karkamış
- Kepirler, Karkamış
- Kıvırcık, Karkamış
- Korkmazlar, Karkamış
- Kuruyazı, Karkamış
- Öncüler, Karkamış
- Örmetaş, Karkamış
- Savaş, Karkamış
- Soylu, Karkamış
- Subağı, Karkamış
- Şenlik, Karkamış
- Teketaşı, Karkamış
- Tosunlu, Karkamış
- Türkyurdu, Karkamış
- Yarımca, Karkamış
- Yaşar, Karkamış
- Yazır, Karkamış
- Yeşerti, Karkamış
- Yolağzı, Karkamış
- Yurtbağı, Karkamış
- Zührecik, Karkamış

== Nizip ==
- Nizip
- Adaklı, Nizip
- Akçakent, Nizip
- Akkuyu, Nizip
- Alahacı, Nizip
- Altındağ, Nizip
- Aşağıbayındır, Nizip
- Aşağıçardak, Nizip
- Bağlıca, Nizip
- Bahçeli, Nizip
- Ballı, Nizip
- Belkıs, Nizip
- Boyluca, Nizip
- Bozalioğlu, Nizip
- Çakmaktepe, Nizip
- Çanakçı, Nizip
- Çatalca, Nizip
- Dayıdağ, Nizip
- Dazhüyük, Nizip
- Doğrular, Nizip
- Duraklı, Nizip
- Dutlu, Nizip
- Düzbayır, Nizip
- Ekinci, Nizip
- Erenköy, Nizip
- Eskikonak, Nizip
- Gaziler, Nizip
- Gevence, Nizip
- Gökçeli, Nizip
- Güder, Nizip
- Gülkaya, Nizip
- Gümüşgün, Nizip
- Günaltı, Nizip
- Gürbaşak, Nizip
- Güzelköy, Nizip
- Hancağız, Nizip
- Hazımoğlu, Nizip
- İkizce, Nizip
- İntepe, Nizip
- Kaleköy, Nizip
- Kamışlı, Nizip
- Karaburç, Nizip
- Kayalar, Nizip
- Keklik, Nizip
- Kesiktaş, Nizip
- Kıraçgülü, Nizip
- Kıratlı, Nizip
- Kızılcakent, Nizip
- Kızılin, Nizip
- Kocatepe, Nizip
- Korucak, Nizip
- Köseler, Nizip
- Kumla, Nizip
- Kurucahüyük, Nizip
- Mağaracık, Nizip
- Mehmetobası, Nizip
- Mercanlı, Nizip
- Mihrap, Nizip
- Nahırtepe, Nizip
- Oğuzlar, Nizip
- Özyurt, Nizip
- Salkım, Nizip
- Samandöken, Nizip
- Samanlı, Nizip
- Saray, Nizip
- Sarıkoç, Nizip
- Sekili, Nizip
- Söğütlü, Nizip
- Suboyu, Nizip
- Tanır, Nizip
- Tatlıcak, Nizip
- Toydemir, Nizip
- Tuluktaş, Nizip
- Turlu, Nizip
- Turnalı, Nizip
- Uluyatır, Nizip
- Yağcılar, Nizip
- Yağmuralan, Nizip
- Yarımtepe, Nizip
- Yeniyapan, Nizip
- Yeniyazı, Nizip
- Yolçatı, Nizip
- Yukarıbayındır, Nizip
- Yukarıçardak, Nizip
- Dernek, Nizip
- Tosunlu, Nizip

== Nurdağı ==
- Nurdağı
- Altınova, Nurdağı
- Ataköy, Nurdağı
- Atmalı, Nurdağı
- Bademli, Nurdağı
- Balıkalan, Nurdağı
- Başpınar, Nurdağı
- Belpınar, Nurdağı
- Çakmak, Nurdağı
- Demirler, Nurdağı
- Durmuşlar, Nurdağı
- Emirler, Nurdağı
- Gedikli, Nurdağı
- Gökçedere, Nurdağı
- Gözlühüyük, Nurdağı
- Hamidiye, Nurdağı
- İçerisu, Nurdağı
- İkizkuyu, Nurdağı
- İncegedik, Nurdağı
- İncirli, Nurdağı
- Karaburçlu, Nurdağı
- Kartal, Nurdağı
- Torunlar, Nurdağı
- Kırışkal, Nurdağı
- Kırkpınar, Nurdağı
- Kömürler, Nurdağı
- Kuzoluk, Nurdağı
- Mesthüyük, Nurdağı
- Naimler, Nurdağı
- Nogaylar, Nurdağı
- Olucak, Nurdağı
- Sakçagözü
- Sayburun, Nurdağı
- Şatırhüyük, Nurdağı
- Tandırlı, Nurdağı
- Terken, Nurdağı
- Tüllüce, Nurdağı
- Yaylacık, Nurdağı

== Oğuzeli ==
- Oğuzeli
- Acer, Oğuzeli
- Akçamezra, Oğuzeli
- Ambarcık, Oğuzeli
- Arslanlı, Oğuzeli
- Asmacık, Oğuzeli
- Aşağı Güneyse, Oğuzeli
- Aşağı Yeniyapan, Oğuzeli
- Aydınkaya, Oğuzeli
- Belören, Oğuzeli
- Büyükkaracaören, Oğuzeli
- Yeni Cumhuriyet, Oğuzeli
- Çatalçam, Oğuzeli
- Çatalsu, Oğuzeli
- Çavuşbaşı, Oğuzeli
- Çaybeyi, Oğuzeli
- Demirkonak, Oğuzeli
- Devehüyüğü, Oğuzeli
- Dibecik, Oğuzeli
- Dikmetaş, Oğuzeli
- Doğanpınar, Oğuzeli
- Dokuzyol, Oğuzeli
- Duruköy, Oğuzeli
- Dutluca, Oğuzeli
- Ekinveren, Oğuzeli
- Ermiş, Oğuzeli
- Gebe, Oğuzeli
- Gündoğan, Oğuzeli
- Güveçli, Oğuzeli
- Hatunlu, Oğuzeli
- Hötoğlu, Oğuzeli
- İkizkuyu, Oğuzeli
- İnceyol, Oğuzeli
- İnkılap, Oğuzeli
- Kabacaağaç, Oğuzeli
- Karaburun, Oğuzeli
- Karadibek, Oğuzeli
- Karaman, Oğuzeli
- Karataş, Oğuzeli
- Kaşyolu, Oğuzeli
- Kavunluk, Oğuzeli
- Kayacık, Oğuzeli
- Kayalıpınar, Oğuzeli
- Keçikuyusu, Oğuzeli
- Keçili, Oğuzeli
- Kersentaş, Oğuzeli
- Kılavuz, Oğuzeli
- Koçaklar, Oğuzeli
- Kovanlı, Oğuzeli
- Kuruçay, Oğuzeli
- Şıh Küçükkaracaviran, Oğuzeli
- Sergili, Oğuzeli
- Sevindi, Oğuzeli
- Sütlüce, Oğuzeli
- Taşçanak, Oğuzeli
- Taşlı, Oğuzeli
- Tınazdere, Oğuzeli
- Tüzel, Oğuzeli
- Uğurova, Oğuzeli
- Ulaşlı, Oğuzeli
- Üçdamlar, Oğuzeli
- Üçkubbe, Oğuzeli
- Yakacık, Oğuzeli
- Yazılı, Oğuzeli
- Yeniköy, Oğuzeli
- Yeşiltepe, Oğuzeli
- Yukarıgüneyse, Oğuzeli

== Yavuzeli ==
- Yavuzeli
- Akbayır, Yavuzeli
- Aşağıhöçüklü, Yavuzeli
- Aşağıkayabaşı, Yavuzeli
- Aşağıkekliktepe, Yavuzeli
- Bağtepe, Yavuzeli
- Bakırca, Yavuzeli
- Ballık, Yavuzeli
- Beğendik, Yavuzeli
- Bülbül, Yavuzeli
- Büyükkarakuyu, Yavuzeli
- Çiltoprak, Yavuzeli
- Çimenli, Yavuzeli
- Değirmitaş, Yavuzeli
- Düzce, Yavuzeli
- Göçmez, Yavuzeli
- Hacımallı, Yavuzeli
- Havuz, Yavuzeli
- Ilıcak, Yavuzeli
- Karabey, Yavuzeli
- Karahüseyinli, Yavuzeli
- Kasaba, Yavuzeli
- Keşrobası, Yavuzeli
- Gülpınar, Yavuzeli
- Kuzuyatağı, Yavuzeli
- Küçükkarakuyu, Yavuzeli
- Karahan, Yavuzeli
- Örenli, Yavuzeli
- Saraymağara, Yavuzeli
- Sarıbuğday, Yavuzeli
- Sarılar, Yavuzeli
- Süleymanobası, Yavuzeli
- Şenlikçe, Yavuzeli
- Tokaçlı, Yavuzeli
- Üçgöl, Yavuzeli
- Yarımca, Yavuzeli
- Yöreli, Yavuzeli
- Yukarıkekliktepe, Yavuzeli
- Yukarıyeniköy, Yavuzeli
- Yeniyurt, Yavuzeli

== Recent development ==
According to Law act no 6360, all Turkish provinces with a population more than 750 000, were renamed as metropolitan municipality. All districts in those provinces became second level municipalities and all villages in those districts were renamed as a neighborhoods . Thus the villages listed above are officially neighborhoods of Gaziantep.
