= Karaçomak, Şahinbey =

Village in Gaziantep Province, Turkey

Karaçomak
- Neighbourhood
- Location in Turkey
- Coordinates: 36°54′33″N 37°25′23″E
- Country: Turkey
- Province: Gaziantep
- District: Şahinbey
- Population (2022): 252
- Time zone: UTC+3 (TRT)

Karaçomak is a neighbourhood in the municipality and district of Şahinbey, Gaziantep Province, Turkey. Its population is 252 (2022). The village is inhabited by Turkmens and Abdals of the Kara Hacılar tribe. The inhabitants are Alevis and belong to the Hacım Sultan ocak.
