= Bostancık, Şahinbey =

Village in Gaziantep Province, Turkey

Bostancık
- Neighbourhood
- Location in Turkey
- Coordinates: 36°53′25″N 37°20′52″E
- Country: Turkey
- Province: Gaziantep
- District: Şahinbey
- Population (2022): 183
- Time zone: UTC+3 (TRT)

Bostancık is a neighbourhood in the municipality and district of Şahinbey, Gaziantep Province, Turkey. Its population is 183 (2022). The village is inhabited by Turkmens. The inhabitants are Alevis and belong to the Hacım Sultan ocak.
