= Kehriz =

Kehriz may refer to:

- Akbulut, Şahinbey, village in Gaziantep Province, Turkey
- Kumla, Nizip, village in Gaziantep Province, Turkey
- Muhacirosman, Şahinbey, village in Gaziantep Province, Turkey
- Samandöken, Nizip, village in Gaziantep Province, Turkey
- Qanat, water management system
