= Bozca =

Bozca may refer to the following settlements in Turkey:

- Bozca, Akyurt, a neighborhood in Ankara Province
- Bozca, Kozlu, a village in Zonguldak Province
- Bozca, Şahinbey, a village in Gaziantep Province
- Bozca, Viranşehir, a Yazidi village in Şanlıurfa Province
