= Sarıt, Şahinbey =

Village in Gaziantep Province, Turkey

Sarıt
- Neighbourhood
- Location in Turkey
- Coordinates: 36°54′17″N 37°16′29″E
- Country: Turkey
- Province: Gaziantep
- District: Şahinbey
- Population (2022): 855
- Time zone: UTC+3 (TRT)

Sarıt is a neighbourhood in the municipality and district of Şahinbey, Gaziantep Province, Turkey. Sarıt's population is 855 (2022).
