= Deredüzü, Şahinbey =

Village in Gaziantep Province, Turkey

Deredüzü
- Neighbourhood
- Location in Turkey
- Coordinates: 36°54′30″N 37°18′5″E
- Country: Turkey
- Province: Gaziantep
- District: Şahinbey
- Population (2022): 382
- Time zone: UTC+3 (TRT)

Deredüzü is a neighbourhood in the municipality and district of Şahinbey, Gaziantep Province, Turkey. Its population is 382 (2022).
