= Taşyazı, Oğuzeli =

Village in Gaziantep Province, Turkey

Taşyazı
- Neighbourhood
- Location in Turkey
- Coordinates: 36°53′18″N 37°26′53″E
- Country: Turkey
- Province: Gaziantep
- District: Oğuzeli
- Population (2022): 269
- Time zone: UTC+3 (TRT)

Taşyazı, historically Hengirmen, is a neighbourhood in the municipality and district of Oğuzeli, Gaziantep Province, Turkey. Its population is 269 (2022). The village is inhabited by Abdals of the Kara Hacılar tribe.
