= Bayramlı, Şahinbey =

Village in Gaziantep Province, Turkey

Bayramlı
- Neighbourhood
- Location in Turkey
- Coordinates: 37°1′9″N 37°28′59″E
- Country: Turkey
- Province: Gaziantep
- District: Şahinbey
- Population (2022): 943
- Time zone: UTC+3 (TRT)

Bayramlı, historically Aşağıkilisecik, is a neighbourhood in the municipality and district of Şahinbey, Gaziantep Province, Turkey. Its population is 943 (2022).
