= Çapalı, Şahinbey =

Village in Gaziantep Province, Turkey

Çapalı
- Neighbourhood
- Location in Turkey
- Coordinates: 36°51′33″N 37°18′21″E
- Country: Turkey
- Province: Gaziantep
- District: Şahinbey
- Population (2022): 154
- Time zone: UTC+3 (TRT)

Çapalı is a neighbourhood in the municipality and district of Şahinbey, Gaziantep Province, Turkey. Its population is 154 (2022). The village is inhabited by Turkmens. The inhabitants are Alevis belonging to the Dede Kargın, Hacım Sultan and Baba Kaygusuz ocaks.
