= Altınyurt, Oğuzeli =

Village in Gaziantep Province, Turkey

Altınyurt
- Neighbourhood
- Location in Turkey
- Coordinates: 36°55′58″N 37°29′27″E
- Country: Turkey
- Province: Gaziantep
- District: Oğuzeli
- Population (2022): 860
- Time zone: UTC+3 (TRT)

Altınyurt, historically and still informally called Şiveydin, is a neighbourhood in the municipality and district of Oğuzeli, Gaziantep Province, Turkey. Its population is 860 (2022). The village is inhabited by Turkmens of the Elbegli tribe.
