= Osmanlı, Şahinbey =

Village in Gaziantep Province, Turkey

Osmanlı
- Neighbourhood
- Location in Turkey
- Coordinates: 37°1′47″N 37°27′4″E
- Country: Turkey
- Province: Gaziantep
- District: Şahinbey
- Population (2022): 3,912
- Time zone: UTC+3 (TRT)

Osmanlı, historically Babilge, is a neighbourhood in the municipality and district of Şahinbey, Gaziantep Province, Turkey. Its population is 3,912 (2022).
