= Akpınar, Şahinbey =

Village in Gaziantep Province, Turkey

Akpınar
- Neighbourhood
- Location in Turkey
- Coordinates: 37°2′7″N 37°10′45″E
- Country: Turkey
- Province: Gaziantep
- District: Şahinbey
- Population (2022): 322
- Time zone: UTC+3 (TRT)

Akpınar is a neighbourhood in the municipality and district of Şahinbey, Gaziantep Province, Turkey. Its population is 322 (2022).
