= Kaleboynu, Şahinbey =

Village in Gaziantep Province, Turkey

Kaleboynu
- Neighbourhood
- Location in Turkey
- Coordinates: 37°4′19″N 37°11′45″E
- Country: Turkey
- Province: Gaziantep
- District: Şahinbey
- Population (2022): 235
- Time zone: UTC+3 (TRT)

Kaleboynu, historically Tıhnatan, is a neighbourhood in the municipality and district of Şahinbey, Gaziantep Province, Turkey. The village had a population of 235 in 2022.
