= Töreli, Şahinbey =

Village in Gaziantep Province, Turkey

Töreli
- Neighbourhood
- Location in Turkey
- Coordinates: 36°51′9″N 37°19′38″E
- Country: Turkey
- Province: Gaziantep
- District: Şahinbey
- Population (2022): 53
- Time zone: UTC+3 (TRT)

Töreli, historically and still informally known as Babakır, is a neighbourhood in the municipality and district of Şahinbey, Gaziantep Province, Turkey. The village is inhabited Turkmens and had a population of 53 in 2022. The inhabitants are Alevis and belong to the Hacım Sultan and Baba Kaygusuz ocaks.
