= Sarıbaşak, Şahinbey =

Village in Gaziantep Province, Turkey

Sarıbaşak
- Neighbourhood
- Location in Turkey
- Coordinates: 37°6′16″N 37°14′56″E
- Country: Turkey
- Province: Gaziantep
- District: Şahinbey
- Population (2022): 981
- Time zone: UTC+3 (TRT)

Sarıbaşak, historically Ispartınınmezrası, is a neighbourhood in the municipality and district of Şahinbey, Gaziantep Province, Turkey. The village had a population of 981 in 2022.
