= Durantaş, Şahinbey =

Village in Gaziantep Province, Turkey

Durantaş
- Neighbourhood
- Location in Turkey
- Coordinates: 37°1′32″N 37°14′7″E
- Country: Turkey
- Province: Gaziantep
- District: Şahinbey
- Population (2022): 750
- Time zone: UTC+3 (TRT)

Durantaş, historically Zevkir, is a neighbourhood in the municipality and district of Şahinbey, Gaziantep Province, Turkey. The village had a population of 750 in 2022.
