= Yeşildere, Oğuzeli =

Village in Gaziantep Province, Turkey

Yeşildere
- Neighbourhood
- Location in Turkey
- Coordinates: 36°58′55″N 37°30′11″E
- Country: Turkey
- Province: Gaziantep
- District: Oğuzeli
- Population (2022): 716
- Time zone: UTC+3 (TRT)

Yeşildere is a neighbourhood in the municipality and district of Oğuzeli, Gaziantep Province, Turkey. Its population is 716 (2022). The village is inhabited by Abdals of the Maya Sekenler tribe. It was an independent municipality until it was merged into the municipality of Oğuzeli in 2008.
