= Kerer, Şahinbey =

Village in Gaziantep Province, Turkey

Kerer
- Neighbourhood
- Location in Turkey
- Coordinates: 36°52′53″N 37°24′32″E
- Country: Turkey
- Province: Gaziantep
- District: Şahinbey
- Population (2022): 127
- Time zone: UTC+3 (TRT)

Kerer is a neighbourhood in the municipality and district of Şahinbey, Gaziantep Province, Turkey. Its population is 127 (2022). The village is inhabited by Abdals of the Kara Hacılar tribe.
