= Kabarcık, Şahinbey =

Village in Gaziantep Province, Turkey

Kabarcık
- Neighbourhood
- Location in Turkey
- Coordinates: 37°3′25″N 37°11′38″E
- Country: Turkey
- Province: Gaziantep
- District: Şahinbey
- Population (2022): 165
- Time zone: UTC+3 (TRT)

Kabarcık, historically Cartıl, is a neighbourhood in the municipality and district of Şahinbey, Gaziantep Province, Turkey. Its population is 165 (2022).
