= Gürsu, Oğuzeli =

Village in Gaziantep Province, Turkey

Gürsu
- Neighbourhood
- Location in Turkey
- Coordinates: 36°58′53″N 37°29′34″E
- Country: Turkey
- Province: Gaziantep
- District: Oğuzeli
- Population (2022): 1,285
- Time zone: UTC+3 (TRT)

Gürsu, historically Hacar, is a neighbourhood in the municipality and district of Oğuzeli, Gaziantep Province, Turkey. Its population is 1,285 (2022).
