= Yalnızbağ, Oğuzeli =

Village in Gaziantep Province, Turkey

Yalnızbağ
- Neighbourhood
- Location in Turkey
- Coordinates: 36°59′26″N 37°27′42″E
- Country: Turkey
- Province: Gaziantep
- District: Oğuzeli
- Population (2022): 290
- Time zone: UTC+3 (TRT)

Yalnızbağ, formerly and still informally called Nafak, is a neighbourhood in the municipality and district of Oğuzeli, Gaziantep Province, Turkey. Its population is 290 (2022). The village is inhabited by Turkmens.
