= Hacıköprü, Şahinbey =

Village in Gaziantep Province, Turkey

Hacıköprü
- Neighbourhood
- Location in Turkey
- Coordinates: 36°50′39″N 37°21′49″E
- Country: Turkey
- Province: Gaziantep
- District: Şahinbey
- Population (2022): 137
- Time zone: UTC+3 (TRT)

Hacıköprü is a neighbourhood in the municipality and district of Şahinbey, Gaziantep Province, Turkey. The village had a population of 137 in 2022 and is inhabited by Turkmens of the Afshar tribe. The inhabitants are Alevis and belong to the Hacım Sultan ocak.
