= Burç Karakuyu, Şahinbey =

Village in Gaziantep Province, Turkey

Burç Karakuyu
- Neighbourhood
- Location in Turkey
- Coordinates: 36°57′14″N 37°14′31″E
- Country: Turkey
- Province: Gaziantep
- District: Şahinbey
- Population (2022): 137
- Time zone: UTC+3 (TRT)

Burç Karakuyu is a neighbourhood in the municipality and district of Şahinbey, Gaziantep Province, Turkey. The village had a population of 137 in 2022.
