= Serince, Şahinbey =

Village in Gaziantep Province, Turkey

Serince
- Neighbourhood
- Location in Turkey
- Coordinates: 36°59′49″N 37°15′12″E
- Country: Turkey
- Province: Gaziantep
- District: Şahinbey
- Population (2022): 1,292
- Time zone: UTC+3 (TRT)

Serince, historically Zemge, is a neighbourhood in the municipality and district of Şahinbey, Gaziantep Province, Turkey. The village had a population of 1,292 in 2022.
