= Yeşilkent, Şahinbey =

Village in Gaziantep Province, Turkey

Yeşilkent
- Neighbourhood
- Location in Turkey
- Coordinates: 37.025°N 37.429°E
- Country: Turkey
- Province: Gaziantep
- District: Şahinbey
- Population (2022): 1,879
- Time zone: UTC+3 (TRT)

Yeşilkent, historically Nurgana, is a neighbourhood in the municipality and district of Şahinbey, Gaziantep Province, Turkey. The village had a population of 1,879 in 2022.
