= Güzelce, Oğuzeli =

Village in Gaziantep Province, Turkey

Güzelce
- Neighbourhood
- Location in Turkey
- Coordinates: 36°54′13″N 37°27′27″E
- Country: Turkey
- Province: Gaziantep
- District: Oğuzeli
- Population (2022): 84
- Time zone: UTC+3 (TRT)

Güzelce is a neighbourhood in the municipality and district of Oğuzeli, Gaziantep Province, Turkey. Its population is 84 (2022).
