= Sazgın, Oğuzeli =

Village in Gaziantep Province, Turkey

Sazgın
- Neighbourhood
- Location within Turkey
- Coordinates: 36°56′26″N 37°27′47″E
- Country: Turkey
- Province: Gaziantep
- District: Oğuzeli
- Population (2022): 325
- Time zone: UTC+3 (TRT)

Sazgın is a neighbourhood in the municipality and district of Oğuzeli, Gaziantep Province, Turkey. Its population is 325 (2022). The village is inhabited by Turkmens of the Barak tribe and Abdals of the Kara Hacılar tribe.
