= Direkli =

Direkli may refer to:

- Direkli, Amasya, a village in Amasya Province, Turkey
- Direkli, Bingöl, a village in Bingöl Province, Turkey
- Direkli, Genç, a village in Bingöl Province, Turkey
- Direkli, Oğuzeli, a village in Gaziantep Province, Turkey
