= Sünköy, Elazığ =

Village in Turkey

Sünköy
- Village
- Location within Turkey
- Coordinates: 38°40′21″N 38°59′23″E
- Country: Turkey
- Province: Elazığ
- District: Elazığ
- Population (2021): 307
- Time zone: UTC+3 (TRT)

Sünköy is a village in the Elazığ District of Elazığ Province in Turkey. Its population is 307 (2021).

The village is the centre of the Kurdish Alevi Axûçan ocax.

== Notable people ==
- Gültan Kışanak
