= Damlacık, Şahinbey =

Village in Gaziantep Province, Turkey

Damlacık
- Neighbourhood
- Location in Turkey
- Coordinates: 37°5′9″N 37°12′8″E
- Country: Turkey
- Province: Gaziantep
- District: Şahinbey
- Population (2022): 548
- Time zone: UTC+3 (TRT)

Damlacık is a neighbourhood in the municipality and district of Şahinbey, Gaziantep Province, Turkey. The village is inhabited by Turkmens of the Qiziq tribe and had a population of 548 in 2022.
