= Uruş =

Uruş may refer to:

- Uruş, Beypazarı, rural neighborhood in Ankara Province, Turkey
- Dokuzyol, Oğuzeli, historically Uruş, rural neighborhood in Gaziantep Province Turkey
