= Dero Küçükkaracaviran, Oğuzeli =

Village in Gaziantep Province, Turkey

Dero Küçükkaracaviran
- Neighbourhood
- Location in Turkey
- Coordinates: 36°43′38″N 37°35′26″E
- Country: Turkey
- Province: Gaziantep
- District: Oğuzeli
- Population (2022): 61
- Time zone: UTC+3 (TRT)

Dero Küçükkaracaviran, also known as Küçükkaracaören, is a neighbourhood in the municipality and district of Oğuzeli, Gaziantep Province, Turkey. Its population is 61 (2022). The village is inhabited by Turkmens of the Elbegli tribe and Abdals of the Kurular tribe.
