= Sarısalkım, Şahinbey =

Village in Gaziantep Province, Turkey

Sarısalkım
- Neighbourhood
- Location in Turkey
- Coordinates: 37°5′27″N 37°16′49″E
- Country: Turkey
- Province: Gaziantep
- District: Şahinbey
- Population (2022): 3,512
- Time zone: UTC+3 (TRT)

Sarısalkım, historically and still informally called İsbatrin, is a neighbourhood in the municipality and district of Şahinbey, Gaziantep Province, Turkey. The village is inhabited by Turkmens of the Elbegli tribe and had a population of 3,512 in 2022.
