= Yağdöver, Şahinbey =

Village in Gaziantep Province, Turkey

Yağdöver
- Neighbourhood
- Location in Turkey
- Coordinates: 36°55′38″N 37°24′44″E
- Country: Turkey
- Province: Gaziantep
- District: Şahinbey
- Population (2022): 243
- Time zone: UTC+3 (TRT)

Yağdöver, historically Küçükmasere, is a neighbourhood in the municipality and district of Şahinbey, Gaziantep Province, Turkey. Its population is 243 (2022). The village is inhabited by Abdals of the Kara Hacılar tribe.
