= Küçükkızılhisar, Şahinbey =

Village in Gaziantep Province, Turkey

Küçükkızılhisar
- Neighbourhood
- Location in Turkey
- Coordinates: 37°0′10″N 37°18′25″E
- Country: Turkey
- Province: Gaziantep
- District: Şahinbey
- Population (2022): 2,188
- Time zone: UTC+3 (TRT)

Küçükkızılhisar is a neighbourhood in the municipality and district of Şahinbey, Gaziantep Province, Turkey. The village had a population of 2,188 in 2022.
