= Kazıklı, Şahinbey =

Village in Gaziantep Province, Turkey

Kazıklı
- Neighbourhood
- Location in Turkey
- Coordinates: 36°48′14″N 37°18′33″E
- Country: Turkey
- Province: Gaziantep
- District: Şahinbey
- Population (2022): 460
- Time zone: UTC+3 (TRT)

Kazıklı is a neighbourhood in the municipality and district of Şahinbey, Gaziantep Province, Turkey. The village is inhabited by Yörüks and had a population of 460 in 2022. The inhabitants are Alevis and belong to the Hacım Sultan and Baba Kaygusuz ocaks.
