= Çevreli =

Çevreli may refer to the following settlements in Turkey:

- Çevreli, Adaklı, a village in Bingöl Province
- Çevreli, Alaca, a village in Çorum Province
- Çevreli, Almus, a town (belde) in Tokat Province
- Çevreli, Demre, a neighbourhood in Antalya Province
- Çevreli, Kastamonu, a village in Kastamonu Province
- Çevreli, Mudurnu, a village in Bolu Province
- Çevreli, Şahinbey or Burtu, is a neighbourhood in Gaziantep Province
- Çevreli, Tarsus, a neighbourhood in Mersin Province
- Çevreli, Yusufeli, a village in Artvin Province
