= Zeytinli (disambiguation) =

Zeytinli is a neighbourhood of Edremit, Balıkesir Province, Turkey.

Zeytinli may also refer to the following settlements in Turkey:

- Zeytinli, Bayramiç, a village in Çanakkale Province
- Zeytinli, Şahinbey or Ulumasere, a neighbourhood in Gaziantep Province
- Zeytinli, Seyhan, a neighbourhood in Adana Province
- Zeytinli, Yeşilli, a neighbourhood in Mardin Province
