= Şahinbey, Oğuzeli =

Village in Gaziantep Province, Turkey

Şahinbey
- Neighbourhood
- Location in Turkey
- Coordinates: 36°57′2″N 37°25′10″E
- Country: Turkey
- Province: Gaziantep
- District: Oğuzeli
- Population (2022): 2,181
- Time zone: UTC+3 (TRT)

Şahinbey, historically and still informally called Körkün, is a neighbourhood in the municipality and district of Oğuzeli, Gaziantep Province, Turkey. Its population is 2,181 (2022). The village is inhabited by Turkmens of various tribal affiliations, including the Barak tribe as well as Abdals of the Kara Hacılar tribe.
