= Beşdeli, Oğuzeli =

Village in Gaziantep Province, Turkey

Beşdeli
- Neighbourhood
- Location in Turkey
- Coordinates: 36°52′41″N 37°27′43″E
- Country: Turkey
- Province: Gaziantep
- District: Oğuzeli
- Population (2022): 34
- Time zone: UTC+3 (TRT)

Beşdeli is a neighbourhood in the municipality and district of Oğuzeli, Gaziantep Province, Turkey. Its population is 34 (2022). The village is inhabited by Turkmens and Abdals.
