= Cebeler, Şahinbey =

Village in Gaziantep Province, Turkey

Cebeler
- Neighbourhood
- Location in Turkey
- Coordinates: 37°2′21″N 37°15′28″E
- Country: Turkey
- Province: Gaziantep
- District: Şahinbey
- Population (2022): 639
- Time zone: UTC+3 (TRT)

Cebeler, historically Mahraman, is a neighbourhood in the municipality and district of Şahinbey, Gaziantep Province, Turkey. The village had a population of 639 in 2022.
