= Geneyik, Şahinbey =

Village in Gaziantep Province, Turkey

Geneyik
- Neighbourhood
- Location in Turkey
- Coordinates: 36°56′40″N 37°18′32″E
- Country: Turkey
- Province: Gaziantep
- District: Şahinbey
- Population (2022): 621
- Time zone: UTC+3 (TRT)

Geneyik is a neighbourhood in the municipality and district of Şahinbey, Gaziantep Province, Turkey. Its population is 621 (2022). The village is inhabited by Turkmens.
