= Burç Esentepe, Şahinbey =

Village in Gaziantep Province, Turkey

Burç Esentepe
- Neighbourhood
- Location in Turkey
- Coordinates: 37°0′57″N 37°11′8″E
- Country: Turkey
- Province: Gaziantep
- District: Şahinbey
- Population (2022): 2,428
- Time zone: UTC+3 (TRT)

Burç Esentepe is a neighbourhood in the municipality and district of Şahinbey, Gaziantep Province, Turkey. The village had a population of 2,428 in 2022. Burç was an independent municipality until it was merged into the municipality of Şahinbey in 2008.
