= Külecik, Şahinbey =

Village in Gaziantep Province, Turkey

Külecik
- Neighbourhood
- Location in Turkey
- Coordinates: 36°48′57″N 37°18′44″E
- Country: Turkey
- Province: Gaziantep
- District: Şahinbey
- Population (2022): 59
- Time zone: UTC+3 (TRT)

Külecik is a neighbourhood in the municipality and district of Şahinbey, Gaziantep Province, Turkey. The village is inhabited by Turkmens and had a population of 59 in 2022. The inhabitants are Alevis and belong to the Hacım Sultan ocak.
