= Yazıbağı, Şahinbey =

Village in Gaziantep Province, Turkey

Yazıbağı
- Neighbourhood
- Location in Turkey
- Coordinates: 37°2′57″N 37°8′17″E
- Country: Turkey
- Province: Gaziantep
- District: Şahinbey
- Population (2022): 87
- Time zone: UTC+3 (TRT)

Yazıbağı, historically Hezekkaradinek, is a neighbourhood in the municipality and district of Şahinbey, Gaziantep Province, Turkey. The village had a population of 87 in 2022.
