= Killik, Şahinbey =

Village in Gaziantep Province, Turkey

Killik
- Neighbourhood
- Location in Turkey
- Coordinates: 36°50′9″N 37°23′38″E
- Country: Turkey
- Province: Gaziantep
- District: Şahinbey
- Population (2022): 140
- Time zone: UTC+3 (TRT)

Killik is a neighbourhood in the municipality and district of Şahinbey, Gaziantep Province, Turkey. The village had a population of 140 in 2022. The village is inhabited by Turkmens. The inhabitants are Alevis and belong to the Hacım Sultan and Baba Kaygusuz ocaks.
