= Çaybaşı (disambiguation) =

Çaybaşı, formerly Çilader, is a municipality and district of Ordu Province, Turkey.

Çaybaşı may also refer to the following settlements in Turkey:

- Çaybaşı, Çüngüş, a neighbourhood in Diyarbakır Province
- Çaybaşı, Elmalı, a neighbourhood in Antalya Province
- Çaybaşı, Genç, a village in Bingöl Province
- Çaybaşı, Kahta, a village in Adıyaman Province
- Çaybaşı, Kızıltepe, a neighbourhood in Mardin Province
- Çaybaşı, Merzifon, a village in Amasya Province
- Çaybaşı, Oğuzeli or Cağdın, a neighbourhood in Gaziantep Province
