= Almalı, Şahinbey =

Village in Gaziantep Province, Turkey

Almalı
- Neighbourhood
- Location within Turkey
- Coordinates: 36°52′57″N 37°21′59″E
- Country: Turkey
- Province: Gaziantep
- District: Şahinbey
- Population (2022): 246
- Time zone: UTC+3 (TRT)

Almalı is a neighbourhood in the municipality and district of Şahinbey, Gaziantep Province, Turkey. Its population is 246 (2022).
