= Keçili, Oğuzeli =

Village in Gaziantep Province, Turkey

Keçili
- Neighbourhood
- Location in Turkey
- Coordinates: 36°49′59″N 37°44′23″E
- Country: Turkey
- Province: Gaziantep
- District: Oğuzeli
- Population (2022): 97
- Time zone: UTC+3 (TRT)

Keçili is a neighbourhood in the municipality and district of Oğuzeli, Gaziantep Province, Turkey. Its population is 97 (2022). The village is inhabited by Turkmens of the Barak tribe.
