= Dokur, Şahinbey =

Village in Gaziantep Province, Turkey

Dokur
- Neighbourhood
- Location in Turkey
- Coordinates: 36°58′17″N 37°4′18″E
- Country: Turkey
- Province: Gaziantep
- District: Şahinbey
- Population (2022): 163
- Time zone: UTC+3 (TRT)

Dokur, historically Esmegemriği, is a neighbourhood in the municipality and district of Şahinbey, Gaziantep Province, Turkey. Its population is 163 (2022).
