= Hötoğlu, Oğuzeli =

Village in Gaziantep Province, Turkey

Hötoğlu
- Neighbourhood
- Location in Turkey
- Coordinates: 36°46′33″N 37°32′0″E
- Country: Turkey
- Province: Gaziantep
- District: Oğuzeli
- Population (2022): 143
- Time zone: UTC+3 (TRT)

Hötoğlu is a neighbourhood in the municipality and district of Oğuzeli, Gaziantep Province, Turkey. Its population is 143 (2022). The village is inhabited by Turkmens from various tribes and Abdals of the Kurular tribe.
