= Kovanlı, Oğuzeli =

Village in Gaziantep Province, Turkey

Kovanlı
- Neighbourhood
- Location in Turkey
- Coordinates: 36°48′41″N 37°41′59″E
- Country: Turkey
- Province: Gaziantep
- District: Oğuzeli
- Population (2022): 115
- Time zone: UTC+3 (TRT)

Kovanlı, formerly and still informally called Zambır, is a neighbourhood in the municipality and district of Oğuzeli, Gaziantep Province, Turkey. Its population is 115 (2022). The village is inhabited by Turkmens of the Barak tribe.
