= Kılavuz, Oğuzeli =

Village in Gaziantep Province, Turkey

Kılavuz
- Neighbourhood
- Location in Turkey
- Coordinates: 36°48′32″N 37°37′21″E
- Country: Turkey
- Province: Gaziantep
- District: Oğuzeli
- Population (2022): 217
- Time zone: UTC+3 (TRT)

Kılavuz is a neighbourhood in the municipality and district of Oğuzeli, Gaziantep Province, Turkey. Its population is 217 (2022). The village is inhabited by Turkmens, Turkicized Arabs of the Damalha tribe, and Abdals of the Kurular tribe.
