= Çubukdiken, Şahinbey =

Village in Gaziantep Province, Turkey

Çubukdiken
- Neighbourhood
- Location in Turkey
- Coordinates: 37°1′51″N 37°2′32″E
- Country: Turkey
- Province: Gaziantep
- District: Şahinbey
- Population (2022): 369
- Time zone: UTC+3 (TRT)

Çubukdiken, historically Dostallı, is a neighbourhood in the municipality and district of Şahinbey, Gaziantep Province, Turkey. Its population is 369 (2022).
