= Demirkonak, Oğuzeli =

Village in Gaziantep Province, Turkey

Demirkonak
- Neighbourhood
- Location in Turkey
- Coordinates: 36°45′0″N 37°35′57″E
- Country: Turkey
- Province: Gaziantep
- District: Oğuzeli
- Population (2022): 112
- Time zone: UTC+3 (TRT)

Demirkonak, historically Barna, is a neighbourhood in the municipality and district of Oğuzeli, Gaziantep Province, Turkey. Its population is 112 (2022). The village is inhabited by Turkmens from the Barak tribe and Abdals of the Kurular tribe.
