= Ekinveren, Oğuzeli =

Village in Gaziantep Province, Turkey

Ekinveren
- Neighbourhood
- Location in Turkey
- Coordinates: 36°52′33″N 37°39′35″E
- Country: Turkey
- Province: Gaziantep
- District: Oğuzeli
- Population (2022): 182
- Time zone: UTC+3 (TRT)

Ekinveren, historically Tilsevet, is a neighbourhood in the municipality and district of Oğuzeli, Gaziantep Province, Turkey. Its population is 182 (2022). The village is inhabited by Turkmens of the Barak tribe and Abdals of the Kuyucular tribe.
