= Yukarıgüneyse, Oğuzeli =

Village in Gaziantep Province, Turkey

Yukarıgüneyse
- Neighbourhood
- Location in Turkey
- Coordinates: 36°50′16″N 37°32′16″E
- Country: Turkey
- Province: Gaziantep
- District: Oğuzeli
- Population (2022): 148
- Time zone: UTC+3 (TRT)

Yukarıgüneyse is a neighbourhood in the municipality and district of Oğuzeli, Gaziantep Province, Turkey. Its population is 148 (2022). The village is inhabited by Turkmens of the Barak tribe and Turkicized Arabs of the Damalha tribe.
