= Kaşyolu, Oğuzeli =

Village in Gaziantep Province, Turkey

Kaşyolu
- Neighbourhood
- Location in Turkey
- Coordinates: 36°52′23″N 37°35′4″E
- Country: Turkey
- Province: Gaziantep
- District: Oğuzeli
- Population (2022): 191
- Time zone: UTC+3 (TRT)

Kaşyolu, historically Kerim, is a neighbourhood in the municipality and district of Oğuzeli, Gaziantep Province, Turkey. Its population is 191 (2022).
