= Karaburun, Oğuzeli =

Village in Gaziantep Province, Turkey

Karaburun
- Neighbourhood
- Location in Turkey
- Coordinates: 36°49′23″N 37°36′46″E
- Country: Turkey
- Province: Gaziantep
- District: Oğuzeli
- Population (2022): 74
- Time zone: UTC+3 (TRT)

Karaburun is a neighbourhood in the municipality and district of Oğuzeli, Gaziantep Province, Turkey. It has a population of 74 (2022). The village is inhabited by Turkmens of the Elbegli tribe.
