= İnceyol, Oğuzeli =

Village in Gaziantep Province, Turkey

İnceyol
- Neighbourhood
- Location in Turkey
- Coordinates: 36°48′19″N 37°27′47″E
- Country: Turkey
- Province: Gaziantep
- District: Oğuzeli
- Population (2022): 117
- Time zone: UTC+3 (TRT)

İnceyol, historically Aşağısemavin, is a neighbourhood in the municipality and district of Oğuzeli, Gaziantep Province, Turkey. Its population is 117 (2022).
