= Yakacık, Oğuzeli =

Village in Gaziantep Province, Turkey

Yakacık
- Neighbourhood
- Location in Turkey
- Coordinates: 36°54′11″N 37°32′0″E
- Country: Turkey
- Province: Gaziantep
- District: Oğuzeli
- Population (2022): 650
- Time zone: UTC+3 (TRT)

Yakacık, historically and still informally called Zıramba, is a neighbourhood in the municipality and district of Oğuzeli, Gaziantep Province, Turkey. Its population is 650 (2022). The village is inhabited by Turkmens of various tribes, including Elbegli and Barak, as well as Abdals of the Maya Sekenler tribe.
