= İkizkuyu, Oğuzeli =

Village in Gaziantep Province, Turkey

İkizkuyu
- Neighbourhood
- Location in Turkey
- Coordinates: 36°52′37″N 37°29′57″E
- Country: Turkey
- Province: Gaziantep
- District: Oğuzeli
- Population (2022): 59
- Time zone: UTC+3 (TRT)

İkizkuyu is a neighbourhood in the municipality and district of Oğuzeli, Gaziantep Province, Turkey. Its population is 59 (2022). The village is inhabited by Turkmens of the Barak tribe and Abdals of the Kara Hacılar tribe.
