= Ekinli, Şahinbey =

Village in Gaziantep Province, Turkey

Ekinli
- Neighbourhood
- Location in Turkey
- Coordinates: 36°49′13″N 37°21′55″E
- Country: Turkey
- Province: Gaziantep
- District: Şahinbey
- Population (2022): 132
- Time zone: UTC+3 (TRT)

Ekinli is a neighbourhood in the municipality and district of Şahinbey, Gaziantep Province, Turkey. The village had a population of 132 in 2022.
