= Belenköy, Şahinbey =

Village in Gaziantep Province, Turkey

Belenköy
- Neighbourhood
- Location in Turkey
- Coordinates: 37°3′1″N 37°4′35″E
- Country: Turkey
- Province: Gaziantep
- District: Şahinbey
- Population (2022): 249
- Time zone: UTC+3 (TRT)

Belenköy is a neighbourhood in the municipality and district of Şahinbey, Gaziantep Province, Turkey. Its population is 249 (2022).
