= Sarıkaya, Şahinbey =

Village in Gaziantep Province, Turkey

Sarıkaya
- Neighbourhood
- Location in Turkey
- Coordinates: 37°4′55″N 37°2′48″E
- Country: Turkey
- Province: Gaziantep
- District: Şahinbey
- Population (2022): 895
- Time zone: UTC+3 (TRT)

Sarıkaya is a neighbourhood in the municipality and district of Şahinbey, Gaziantep Province, Turkey. Its population is 895 (2022).
