= Cevizli, Şahinbey =

Cevizli
- Neighbourhood
- Location in Turkey
- Coordinates: 36.9354°N 37.1136°E
- Country: Turkey
- Province: Gaziantep
- District: Şahinbey
- Population (2022): 848
- Time zone: UTC+3 (TRT)
- Area code: 0342

Cevizli, also known as Lohan, is a neighbourhood of the municipality and district of Şahinbey, Gaziantep Province, Turkey. Its population is 848 (2022). Before the 2013 reorganisation, it was a town (belde). It is 30 kilometres (19 mi) southwest of Turkey's sixth largest city, Gaziantep.

== Etymology ==
The village was recorded as Lohan or Luhan since the Ottoman times. This name was derived from Uluhan (lit. 'grand inn'), which was used by traveler Alexander Drummond in mid-18th century as the name of the village.

Cevizli, the other name of the village, is also a Turkish word meaning "with nuts," named after the village's walnut and pistachio trees.

== History ==
18th-century Scottish consul Alexander Drummond visited the village and described it as the handsomest he has ever seen in the region in his travel book. He implied that the village then lacked a mosque. The village is inhabited by Turkomans of the Elbegli tribe.

== Geography ==
Geographically, the village sits on the slope of a small hill, opposite a much larger hill with a spring water stream passing between the two hills. In times past the region was heavily wooded and green. Now, most of the greenery that survives, clings to the banks of the spring water stream running between the two hills.

The native fauna once included leopards, bears and tigers. All that remains are striped hyenas, spur-heeled tortoises, the occasional wolf, various species of skink lizards and chameleons, semi-domesticated dogs and cats, as well as geese and poultry. Along with farming animals such as sheep, goats, cattle, mules, donkeys and horses. Some other native species exist, although a new fauna census needs to be conducted in the region to determine what exactly remains.

Summers are dry and hot, swept by hot Saharan and Arabian desert winds. Snow falls in the winter for an average of 17 days during the coldest months. The weather is considered Mediterranean.
