= Gebe, Oğuzeli =

Village in Gaziantep Province, Turkey

Gebe
- Neighbourhood
- Location in Turkey
- Coordinates: 36°48′12″N 37°28′28″E
- Country: Turkey
- Province: Gaziantep
- District: Oğuzeli
- Population (2022): 110
- Time zone: UTC+3 (TRT)

Gebe is a neighbourhood in the municipality and district of Oğuzeli, Gaziantep Province, Turkey. Its population is 110 (2022).
