= Sevindi, Oğuzeli =

Village in Gaziantep Province, Turkey

Sevindi
- Neighbourhood
- Location in Turkey
- Coordinates: 36°47′40″N 37°31′10″E
- Country: Turkey
- Province: Gaziantep
- District: Oğuzeli
- Population (2022): 103
- Time zone: UTC+3 (TRT)

Sevindi is a neighbourhood in the municipality and district of Oğuzeli, Gaziantep Province, Turkey. Its population is 103 (2022). The village is inhabited by Abdals of the Kurular tribe.
