= Yoğuntaş, Şahinbey =

Village in Gaziantep Province, Turkey

Yoğuntaş
- Neighbourhood
- Location in Turkey
- Coordinates: 36°44′1″N 37°22′40″E
- Country: Turkey
- Province: Gaziantep
- District: Şahinbey
- Population (2022): 105
- Time zone: UTC+3 (TRT)

Yoğuntaş, historically Bereke, is a neighbourhood in the municipality and district of Şahinbey, Gaziantep Province, Turkey. The village is inhabited by Turkmens and had a population of 105 in 2022.
