= Akbulut, Şahinbey =

Village in Gaziantep Province, Turkey

Akbulut
- Neighbourhood
- Location in Turkey
- Coordinates: 36°59′27″N 37°24′51″E
- Country: Turkey
- Province: Gaziantep
- District: Şahinbey
- Population (2022): 389
- Time zone: UTC+3 (TRT)

Akbulut, historically Kehriz, is a neighbourhood in the municipality and district of Şahinbey, Gaziantep Province, Turkey. The village had a population of 389 in 2022.
