= Güllüce, Şahinbey =

Village in Gaziantep Province, Turkey

Güllüce
- Neighbourhood
- Location in Turkey
- Coordinates: 36°56′45″N 37°4′21″E
- Country: Turkey
- Province: Gaziantep
- District: Şahinbey
- Population (2022): 125
- Time zone: UTC+3 (TRT)

Güllüce is a neighbourhood in the municipality and district of Şahinbey, Gaziantep Province, Turkey. Its population is 125 (2022).
