= Aydınkaya, Oğuzeli =

Village in Gaziantep Province, Turkey

Aydınkaya
- Neighbourhood
- Location in Turkey
- Coordinates: 36°49′58″N 37°31′33″E
- Country: Turkey
- Province: Gaziantep
- District: Oğuzeli
- Population (2022): 59
- Time zone: UTC+3 (TRT)

Aydınkaya, formerly and still informally known as Kantara, is a neighbourhood in the municipality and district of Oğuzeli, Gaziantep Province, Turkey. Its population is 59 (2022).
