= Kuşçu, Şahinbey =

Village in Gaziantep Province, Turkey

Kuşçu
- Neighbourhood
- Location in Turkey
- Coordinates: 37°0′27″N 37°7′0″E
- Country: Turkey
- Province: Gaziantep
- District: Şahinbey
- Population (2022): 122
- Time zone: UTC+3 (TRT)

Kuşçu is a neighbourhood in the municipality and district of Şahinbey, Gaziantep Province, Turkey. Its population is 122 (2022).

In late 19th century, German orientalist Martin Hartmann listed the village as a settlement of 8 houses inhabited by Turks.
