= Şıh Küçükkaracaviran, Oğuzeli =

Village in Gaziantep Province, Turkey

Şıh Küçükkaracaviran
- Neighbourhood
- Location in Turkey
- Coordinates: 36°53′36″N 37°30′3″E
- Country: Turkey
- Province: Gaziantep
- District: Oğuzeli
- Population (2022): 89
- Time zone: UTC+3 (TRT)

Şıh Küçükkaracaviran is a neighbourhood in the municipality and district of Oğuzeli, Gaziantep Province, Turkey. Its population is 89 (2022).
