= Morcalı, Şahinbey =

Village in Gaziantep Province, Turkey

Morcalı
- Neighbourhood
- Location in Turkey
- Coordinates: 36°55′22″N 37°5′8″E
- Country: Turkey
- Province: Gaziantep
- District: Şahinbey
- Population (2022): 96
- Time zone: UTC+3 (TRT)

Morcalı is a neighbourhood in the municipality and district of Şahinbey, Gaziantep Province, Turkey. The village is inhabited by Turkmens and had a population of 96 in 2022.
