= Dutluca, Oğuzeli =

Village in Gaziantep Province, Turkey

Dutluca
- Neighbourhood
- Location in Turkey
- Coordinates: 36°53′36″N 37°36′42″E
- Country: Turkey
- Province: Gaziantep
- District: Oğuzeli
- Population (2022): 203
- Time zone: UTC+3 (TRT)

Dutluca is a neighbourhood in the municipality and district of Oğuzeli, Gaziantep Province, Turkey. Its population is 203 (2022). The village is inhabited by Turkmens of the Barak tribe and Abdals of the Kuyucular tribe.
