= Kavşak, Şahinbey =

Village in Gaziantep Province, Turkey

Kavşak
- Neighbourhood
- Location in Turkey
- Coordinates: 37°0′38″N 37°8′25″E
- Country: Turkey
- Province: Gaziantep
- District: Şahinbey
- Population (2022): 168
- Time zone: UTC+3 (TRT)

Kavşak, historically Yukarıkilisecik, is a neighbourhood in the municipality and district of Şahinbey, Gaziantep Province, Turkey. The village had a population of 168 in 2022.
