= Kayacık, Oğuzeli =

Village in Gaziantep Province, Turkey

Kayacık
- Neighbourhood
- Location in Turkey
- Coordinates: 36°49′30″N 37°34′26″E
- Country: Turkey
- Province: Gaziantep
- District: Oğuzeli
- Population (2022): 155
- Time zone: UTC+3 (TRT)

Kayacık is a neighbourhood in the municipality and district of Oğuzeli, Gaziantep Province, Turkey. Its population is 155 (2022).
