= Kürüm, Şahinbey =

Village in Gaziantep Province, Turkey

Kürüm
- Neighbourhood
- Location in Turkey
- Coordinates: 36°56′49″N 37°9′42″E
- Country: Turkey
- Province: Gaziantep
- District: Şahinbey
- Population (2022): 237
- Time zone: UTC+3 (TRT)

Kürüm is a neighbourhood in the municipality and district of Şahinbey, Gaziantep Province, Turkey. Its population is 237 (2022).
