= Yamaçtepe, Şahinbey =

Village in Gaziantep Province, Turkey

Yamaçtepe
- Neighbourhood
- Location in Turkey
- Coordinates: 37°4′9″N 37°16′56″E
- Country: Turkey
- Province: Gaziantep
- District: Şahinbey
- Population (2022): 193
- Time zone: UTC+3 (TRT)

Yamaçtepe, historically Yukarısemavin, is a neighbourhood in the municipality and district of Şahinbey, Gaziantep Province, Turkey. The village had a population of 193 in 2022.
