= Çavuşbaşı, Oğuzeli =

Village in Gaziantep Province, Turkey

Çavuşbaşı
- Neighbourhood
- Location in Turkey
- Coordinates: 36°49′47″N 37°29′40″E
- Country: Turkey
- Province: Gaziantep
- District: Oğuzeli
- Population (2022): 27
- Time zone: UTC+3 (TRT)

Çavuşbaşı, historically Dahni, is a neighbourhood in the municipality and district of Oğuzeli, Gaziantep Province, Turkey. Its population is 27 (2022).
