= Oğuzeli =

- District and municipality
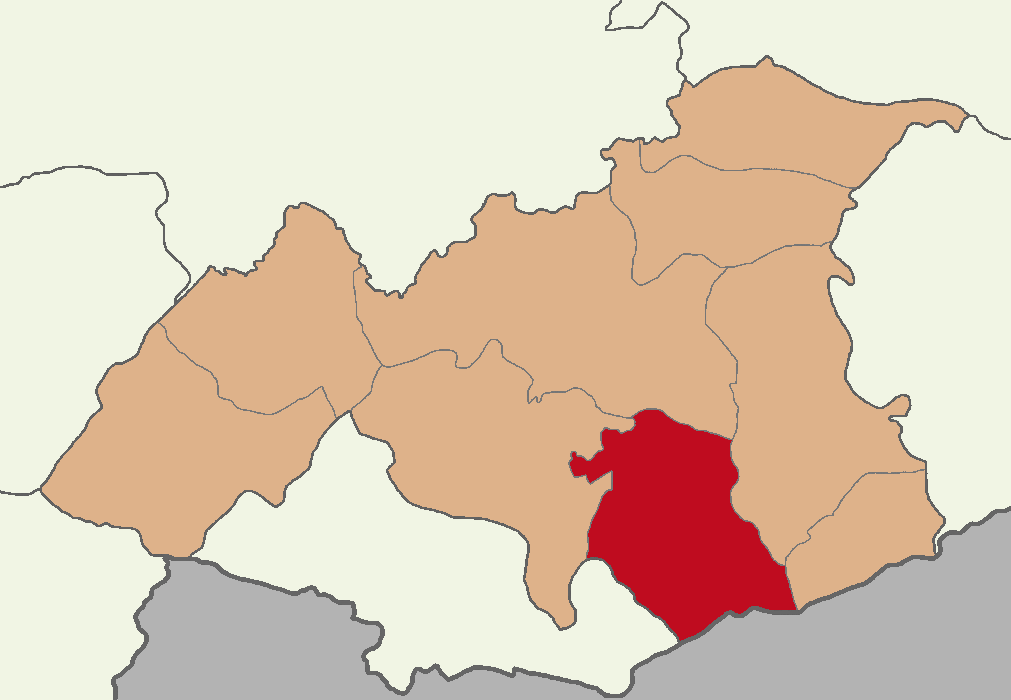
- Map showing Oğuzeli District in Gaziantep Province

- Location in Turkey
- Coordinates: 36°57′54″N 37°30′33″E
- Country: Turkey
- Province: Gaziantep

Government
  - Mayor: Bekir Öztekin (YRP)
- Area: 689 km^{2} (266 sq mi)
- Population (2025): 36,644
  - Density: 53.2/km^{2} (138/sq mi)
- Time zone: UTC+3 (TRT)
- Postal code: 27650
- Area code: 0342
- Website: www.oguzeli.bel.tr

Oğuzeli is a municipality and district of Gaziantep Province, Turkey. Its area is 689 km^{2}, and its population is 36 644 (2025). It is the 6th most populated district of Gaziantep, making it one of the smaller and rural districts alongside Araban, Karkamış, Nurdağı, Yavuzeli. Nevertheless, it is the closest district to the two urban districts of Şehitkamil and Şahinbey that make up Gaziantep City, with its municipal center located just Southeast of the city and the district bordering Hasan Kalyoncu University located at the edge of Şahinbey. As a suburban district, large areas of the district are made of agricultural farms, most particularly used for growing pistachios.

The town is historically inhabited by Turkmens of the Barak tribe and Abdals of the Maya Sekenler tribe.

The suburban district is most significant for housing the Gaziantep GZT Airport, historically referred to as Oğuzeli International Airport, as the 10th busiest airport in Türkiye as of 2025, connecting Gaziantep to many domestic and international destinations. The district is not linked with rail connections and while scheduled shuttle busses going to and from the airport exist, the only ways of reaching the municipal settlement of Oğuzeli remain to be busses and private cars. It is reached through the E90 European motorway, connecting to the O-54 Gaziantep Ring Road, exiting it at its Southeastern edge.

== Composition ==
There are 91 neighbourhoods in Oğuzeli District:

- Acer
- Akçamezra
- Altınyurt
- Ambarcık
- Arslanlı
- Aşağı Güneyse
- Aşağı Yeniyapan
- Asmacık
- Aydınkaya
- Belören
- Beşdeli
- Bulduk
- Büyükkaracaviran
- Çatalçam
- Çatalsu
- Çavuşbaşı
- Çaybaşı
- Çaybeyi
- Cumhuriyet
- Demirkonak
- Dero Küçükkaracaviran
- Devehüyüğü
- Dibecik
- Dikmetaş
- Direkli
- Doğanpınar
- Dokuzyol
- Duruköy
- Dutluca
- Ekinveren
- Ermiş
- Fatih
- Gebe
- Gedik
- Güllük
- Gündoğan
- Gürsu
- Güveçli
- Güzelce
- Hacar
- Hatunlu
- Hötoğlu
- Hürriyet
- İkizkuyu
- İnceyol
- İnkılap
- İnönü
- Kabacaağaç
- Karaburun
- Karadibek
- Karaman
- Karataş
- Kaşyolu
- Kavunluk
- Kayacık
- Kayalıpınar
- Keçikuyusu
- Keçili
- Kersentaş
- Kılavuz
- Koçaklar
- Körkün
- Kovanlı
- Kurtuluş
- Kuruçay
- Mimar Sinan
- Oğuzlar
- Şahinbey
- Sazgın
- Sergili
- Sevindi
- Şıh Küçükkaracaviran
- Subaşı
- Sütlüce
- Taşçanak
- Taşlı
- Taşyazı
- Tınazdere
- Tüzel
- Üçdamlar
- Üçkubbe
- Uğurova
- Ulaşlı
- Yakacık
- Yalnızbağ
- Yazılı
- Yeni Cumhuriyet
- Yeniköy
- Yeşildere
- Yeşiltepe
- Yukarıgüneyse
