= Tınazdere, Oğuzeli =

Village in Gaziantep Province, Turkey

Tınazdere
- Neighbourhood
- Location in Turkey
- Coordinates: 36°55′53″N 37°36′32″E
- Country: Turkey
- Province: Gaziantep
- District: Oğuzeli
- Population (2022): 278
- Time zone: UTC+3 (TRT)

Tınazdere, historically Hülmen, is a neighbourhood in the municipality and district of Oğuzeli, Gaziantep Province, Turkey. Its population is 278 (2022). The village is inhabited by Turkmens of the Barak tribe and Abdals of the Kurular tribe.
