= Kuruçay, Oğuzeli =

Village in Gaziantep Province, Turkey

Kuruçay
- Neighbourhood
- Location in Turkey
- Coordinates: 36°44′37″N 37°34′56″E
- Country: Turkey
- Province: Gaziantep
- District: Oğuzeli
- Population (2022): 35
- Time zone: UTC+3 (TRT)

Kuruçay, formerly and still informally called Kafersarı, is a neighbourhood in the municipality and district of Oğuzeli, Gaziantep Province, Turkey. Its population is 35 (2022). The village is inhabited by Turkmens and Abdals of the Kurular tribe.
