= Karaman, Oğuzeli =

Village in Gaziantep Province, Turkey

Karaman
- Neighbourhood
- Location in Turkey
- Coordinates: 36°50′40″N 37°39′11″E
- Country: Turkey
- Province: Gaziantep
- District: Oğuzeli
- Population (2022): 203
- Time zone: UTC+3 (TRT)

Karaman is a neighbourhood in the municipality and district of Oğuzeli, Gaziantep Province, Turkey. Its population is 203 (2022). The village is inhabited by Turkmens.
