= Pancarlı, Şahinbey =

Village in Gaziantep Province, Turkey

Pancarlı
- Neighbourhood
- Location in Turkey
- Coordinates: 36°48′14″N 37°21′10″E
- Country: Turkey
- Province: Gaziantep
- District: Şahinbey
- Population (2022): 36
- Time zone: UTC+3 (TRT)

Pancarlı is a neighbourhood in the municipality and district of Şahinbey, Gaziantep Province, Turkey. The village is inhabited by Turkmens and had a population of 36 in 2022.
