= Yeşiltepe, Oğuzeli =

Village in Gaziantep Province, Turkey

Yeşiltepe
- Neighbourhood
- Location in Turkey
- Coordinates: 36°47′47″N 37°35′39″E
- Country: Turkey
- Province: Gaziantep
- District: Oğuzeli
- Population (2022): 57
- Time zone: UTC+3 (TRT)

Yeşiltepe is a neighbourhood in the municipality and district of Oğuzeli, Gaziantep Province, Turkey. Its population is 57 (2022).
