= Ozanlı, Şahinbey =

Village in Gaziantep Province, Turkey

Ozanlı
- Neighbourhood
- Location in Turkey
- Coordinates: 36°58′25″N 37°9′4″E
- Country: Turkey
- Province: Gaziantep
- District: Şahinbey
- Population (2022): 134
- Time zone: UTC+3 (TRT)

Ozanlı, historically Pevirge, is a neighbourhood in the municipality and district of Şahinbey, Gaziantep Province, Turkey. Its population is 134 (2022).
