= Dibecik, Oğuzeli =

Village in Gaziantep Province, Turkey

Dibecik
- Neighbourhood
- Location in Turkey
- Coordinates: 36°48′59″N 37°38′48″E
- Country: Turkey
- Province: Gaziantep
- District: Oğuzeli
- Population (2022): 201
- Time zone: UTC+3 (TRT)

Dibecik, formerly and still informally called Vasılı, is a neighbourhood in the municipality and district of Oğuzeli, Gaziantep Province, Turkey. Its population is 201 (2022). The village is inhabited by Turkmens with a minority of Turkicized Arabs of the Damalha tribe and Abdals of the Kurular tribe.
