= Ortaklar, Şahinbey =

Village in Gaziantep Province, Turkey

Ortaklar
- Neighbourhood
- Location in Turkey
- Coordinates: 37°3′10″N 37°1′14″E
- Country: Turkey
- Province: Gaziantep
- District: Şahinbey
- Population (2022): 76
- Time zone: UTC+3 (TRT)

Ortaklar is a neighbourhood in the municipality and district of Şahinbey, Gaziantep Province, Turkey. Its population is 76 (2022).
