= Çöreklik, Şahinbey =

Village in Gaziantep Province, Turkey

Çöreklik
- Neighbourhood
- Location in Turkey
- Coordinates: 36°56′34″N 37°10′35″E
- Country: Turkey
- Province: Gaziantep
- District: Şahinbey
- Population (2022): 70
- Time zone: UTC+3 (TRT)

Çöreklik is a neighbourhood in the municipality and district of Şahinbey, Gaziantep Province, Turkey. Its population is 70 (2022).

In late 19th century, German orientalist Martin Hartmann listed the village as a settlement of 5 houses inhabited by Turks.
