= Taşlı, Oğuzeli =

Village in Gaziantep Province, Turkey

Taşlı
- Neighbourhood
- Location in Turkey
- Coordinates: 36°50′30″N 37°42′44″E
- Country: Turkey
- Province: Gaziantep
- District: Oğuzeli
- Population (2022): 54
- Time zone: UTC+3 (TRT)

Taşlı, formerly and still informally known as Mukbili, is a neighbourhood in the municipality and district of Oğuzeli, Gaziantep Province, Turkey. Its population is 54 (2022). The village is inhabited by Turkmens of the Barak tribe.
