= Çatalsu, Oğuzeli =

Village in Gaziantep Province, Turkey

Çatalsu
- Neighbourhood
- Location in Turkey
- Coordinates: 36°51′52″N 37°25′18″E
- Country: Turkey
- Province: Gaziantep
- District: Oğuzeli
- Population (2022): 415
- Time zone: UTC+3 (TRT)

Çatalsu, formerly and still informally called Arkık, is a neighbourhood in the municipality and district of Oğuzeli, Gaziantep Province, Turkey. Its population is 415 (2022). The village is inhabited by Turkmens and Abdals of the Kara Hacılar tribe.
