= Yığmatepe, Şahinbey =

Village in Gaziantep Province, Turkey

Yığmatepe
- Neighbourhood
- Location in Turkey
- Coordinates: 36°45′23″N 37°20′47″E
- Country: Turkey
- Province: Gaziantep
- District: Şahinbey
- Population (2022): 328
- Time zone: UTC+3 (TRT)

Yığmatepe, historically and still informally called Kemnun or Kemlim, is a neighbourhood in the municipality and district of Şahinbey, Gaziantep Province, Turkey. The village is inhabited by Turkmens of various tribes and had a population of 328 in 2022.
