= Yaylacık, Şahinbey =

Village in Gaziantep Province, Turkey

Yaylacık
- Neighbourhood
- Location in Turkey
- Coordinates: 37°4′56″N 37°8′34″E
- Country: Turkey
- Province: Gaziantep
- District: Şahinbey
- Population (2022): 263
- Time zone: UTC+3 (TRT)

Yaylacık is a neighbourhood in the municipality and district of Şahinbey, Gaziantep Province, Turkey. Its population is 263 (2022).
