= Kapçağız, Şahinbey =

Village in Gaziantep Province, Turkey

Kapçağız
- Neighbourhood
- Location in Turkey
- Coordinates: 36°48′59″N 37°19′46″E
- Country: Turkey
- Province: Gaziantep
- District: Şahinbey
- Population (2022): 634
- Time zone: UTC+3 (TRT)

Kapçağız is a neighbourhood in the municipality and district of Şahinbey, Gaziantep Province, Turkey. The village is inhabited by Turkmens of the Barak tribe and had a population of 634 in 2022.
