= Sütlüce, Oğuzeli =

Village in Gaziantep Province, Turkey

Sütlüce
- Neighbourhood
- Location in Turkey
- Coordinates: 36°50′35″N 37°33′11″E
- Country: Turkey
- Province: Gaziantep
- District: Oğuzeli
- Population (2022): 25
- Time zone: UTC+3 (TRT)

Sütlüce is a neighbourhood in the municipality and district of Oğuzeli, Gaziantep Province, Turkey Its population is 25 (2022). The village is inhabited by Abdals of the Maya Sekenler tribe.
