= Uğurova, Oğuzeli =

Village in Gaziantep Province, Turkey

Uğurova
- Neighbourhood
- Location in Turkey
- Coordinates: 36°53′0″N 37°38′6″E
- Country: Turkey
- Province: Gaziantep
- District: Oğuzeli
- Population (2022): 235
- Time zone: UTC+3 (TRT)

Uğurova, historically Urumevlek (lit. 'Greek field'), is a neighbourhood in the municipality and district of Oğuzeli, Gaziantep Province, Turkey. Its population is 235 (2022). The village is inhabited by Turkmens of the Barak tribe and Abdals of the Kurular tribe.
