= Gerciğin, Şahinbey =

Village in Gaziantep Province, Turkey

Gerciğin
- Neighbourhood
- Location in Turkey
- Coordinates: 37°3′43″N 37°15′22″E
- Country: Turkey
- Province: Gaziantep
- District: Şahinbey
- Population (2022): 371
- Time zone: UTC+3 (TRT)

Gerciğin is a neighbourhood in the municipality and district of Şahinbey, Gaziantep Province, Turkey. The village had a population of 371 in 2022.
