= Akbayır, Şahinbey =

Village in Gaziantep Province, Turkey

Akbayır
- Neighbourhood
- Location in Turkey
- Coordinates: 37°0′30″N 37°1′33″E
- Country: Turkey
- Province: Gaziantep
- District: Şahinbey
- Population (2022): 360
- Time zone: UTC+3 (TRT)

Akbayır, historically Sibke, is a neighbourhood in the municipality and district of Şahinbey, Gaziantep Province, Turkey. Its population is 360 (2022).
