= Sırasöğüt, Şahinbey =

Village in Gaziantep Province, Turkey

Sırasöğüt
- Neighbourhood
- Location in Turkey
- Coordinates: 37°3′9″N 37°6′27″E
- Country: Turkey
- Province: Gaziantep
- District: Şahinbey
- Population (2022): 597
- Time zone: UTC+3 (TRT)

Sırasöğüt, historically Hezek, is a neighbourhood in the municipality and district of Şahinbey, Gaziantep Province, Turkey. Its population is 597 (2022).
