= Ulaşlı, Oğuzeli =

Village in Gaziantep Province, Turkey

Ulaşlı
- Neighbourhood
- Location in Turkey
- Coordinates: 36°47′7″N 37°39′19″E
- Country: Turkey
- Province: Gaziantep
- District: Oğuzeli
- Population (2022): 139
- Time zone: UTC+3 (TRT)

Ulaşlı is a neighbourhood in the municipality and district of Oğuzeli, Gaziantep Province, Turkey. Its population is 139 (2022). The village is inhabited by Turkicized Arabs of the Damalha tribe.
