= Uğurtepe, Şahinbey =

Village in Gaziantep Province, Turkey

Uğurtepe
- Neighbourhood
- Location in Turkey
- Coordinates: 36.95°N 37.095°E
- Country: Turkey
- Province: Gaziantep
- District: Şahinbey
- Population (2022): 136
- Time zone: UTC+3 (TRT)

Uğurtepe, historically Tell Ibrahim, is a neighbourhood in the municipality and district of Şahinbey, Gaziantep Province, Turkey. Its population is 136 (2022).

In late 19th century, German orientalist Martin Hartmann listed the village as a settlement of 6 houses inhabited by Turks.
