= Tiyekli, Şahinbey =

Village in Gaziantep Province, Turkey

Tiyekli
- Neighbourhood
- Location in Turkey
- Coordinates: 37°0′44″N 37°3′46″E
- Country: Turkey
- Province: Gaziantep
- District: Şahinbey
- Population (2022): 147
- Time zone: UTC+3 (TRT)

Tiyekli, historically Hezekyeniyapan, is a neighbourhood in the municipality and district of Şahinbey, Gaziantep Province, Turkey. Its population is 147 (2022).
