= Yeniköy, Oğuzeli =

Village in Gaziantep Province, Turkey

Yeniköy
- Neighbourhood
- Location in Turkey
- Coordinates: 36°52′1″N 37°33′3″E
- Country: Turkey
- Province: Gaziantep
- District: Oğuzeli
- Population (2022): 20
- Time zone: UTC+3 (TRT)

Yeniköy is a neighbourhood in the municipality and district of Oğuzeli, Gaziantep Province, Turkey. Its population is 20 (2022).
