= Kersentaş, Oğuzeli =

Village in Gaziantep Province, Turkey

Kersentaş
- Neighbourhood
- Location in Turkey
- Coordinates: 36°45′37″N 37°41′10″E
- Country: Turkey
- Province: Gaziantep
- District: Oğuzeli
- Population (2022): 93
- Time zone: UTC+3 (TRT)

Kersentaş is a neighbourhood in the municipality and district of Oğuzeli, Gaziantep Province, Turkey. Its population is 93 (2022). The village is inhabited by Turkmens of the Elbegli tribe.
