= Narlıca, Şahinbey =

Village in Gaziantep Province, Turkey

Narlıca
- Neighbourhood
- Location in Turkey
- Coordinates: 37°4′58″N 37°7′24″E
- Country: Turkey
- Province: Gaziantep
- District: Şahinbey
- Population (2022): 132
- Time zone: UTC+3 (TRT)

Narlıca is a neighbourhood in the municipality and district of Şahinbey, Gaziantep Province, Turkey. Its population is 132 (2022).
