= Ermiş, Oğuzeli =

Village in Gaziantep Province, Turkey

Ermiş
- Neighbourhood
- Location in Turkey
- Coordinates: 36°43′53″N 37°37′33″E
- Country: Turkey
- Province: Gaziantep
- District: Oğuzeli
- Population (2022): 305
- Time zone: UTC+3 (TRT)

Ermiş, historically Hüseymin, is a neighbourhood in the municipality and district of Oğuzeli, Gaziantep Province, Turkey. Its population is 305 (2022).
