= Akyazı, Şahinbey =

Village in Gaziantep Province, Turkey

Akyazı
- Neighbourhood
- Location in Turkey
- Coordinates: 36°48′37″N 37°22′50″E
- Country: Turkey
- Province: Gaziantep
- District: Şahinbey
- Population (2022): 123
- Time zone: UTC+3 (TRT)

Akyazı is a neighbourhood in the municipality and district of Şahinbey, Gaziantep Province, Turkey. The village had a population of 123 in 2022.
