= Gülpınar, Şahinbey =

Village in Gaziantep Province, Turkey

Gülpınar
- Neighbourhood
- Location in Turkey
- Coordinates: 36°57′59″N 37°12′2″E
- Country: Turkey
- Province: Gaziantep
- District: Şahinbey
- Population (2022): 408
- Time zone: UTC+3 (TRT)

Gülpınar, historically Kelpin, is a neighbourhood in the municipality and district of Şahinbey, Gaziantep Province, Turkey. The village had a population of 408 in 2022.
