= Kayakent, Şahinbey =

Village in Gaziantep Province, Turkey

Kayakent
- Neighbourhood
- Location in Turkey
- Coordinates: 36°59′44″N 37°8′31″E
- Country: Turkey
- Province: Gaziantep
- District: Şahinbey
- Population (2022): 32
- Time zone: UTC+3 (TRT)

Kayakent is a neighbourhood in the municipality and district of Şahinbey, Gaziantep Province, Turkey. The village had a population of 32 in 2022.
