= Doğanca, Şahinbey =

Village in Gaziantep Province, Turkey

Doğanca
- Neighbourhood
- Location in Turkey
- Coordinates: 36°58′28″N 37°7′27″E
- Country: Turkey
- Province: Gaziantep
- District: Şahinbey
- Population (2022): 217
- Time zone: UTC+3 (TRT)

Doğanca, historically Seğer, is a neighbourhood in the municipality and district of Şahinbey, Gaziantep Province, Turkey. The village had a population of 217 in 2022.
