= Tilhalit =

Village in Gaziantep Province, Turkey

Tilhalit Asmacık
- Neighbourhood
- Location in Turkey
- Coordinates: 36°45′43″N 37°37′46″E
- Country: Turkey
- Province: Gaziantep
- District: Oğuzeli
- Population (2022): 195
- Time zone: UTC+3 (TRT)

Tilhalit, also spelled Tell Khalid (Latin: Trialeth) and officially recognized as Asmacık, is a neighbourhood in the municipality and district of Oğuzeli, Gaziantep Province, Turkey. Its population is 195 (2022). It was a fortress during the 12th century, contested at times by the Crusaders, Zengids and Ayyubids.

The village is inhabited by Abdals of the Kurular tribe.

== History ==
On 29 November 1114, an earthquake devastated Tell Khalid, along with numerous other places across the region of Aleppo. It was also damaged in the 1138 Aleppo earthquake.

In the autumn or winter of 1150, the village was captured by the Zengid ruler Nur ad-Din from the County of Edessa, a Crusader state, which was entirely conquered by the Zengids and other Muslim powers by July 1151. On 17 May 1183, Saladin, a former emir of Nur ad-Din, turned Ayyubid sultan, captured Tell Bashir as part of his general movement to capture Aleppo, which he besieged four days later, from the Zengids. Saladin's brother, Buri, had already been besieging Tell Khalid, but its town and fortress surrendered without fighting upon Saladin's arrival there. It was thereafter bestowed to Badr ad-Din Dildirim al-Yaruqi, the Turkmen lord of nearby Tell Bashir and ally of Saladin. He continued to hold Tell Bashir well after the death of Saladin, and into the 12th century during the latter's son az-Zahir Ghazi's rule over the Emirate of Aleppo, which included Tell Bashir. By 1218, it was firmly in the possession of az-Zahir Ghazi's son and successor, al-Aziz Muhammad. There is scant information about Tell Khalid in the historical record after the Ayyubid era.

== Bibliography ==
- Ambraseys, Nicholas N. (April–June 2004). "The 12th Century Seismic Paroxysm in the Middle East: A Historical Perspective". Annals of Geophysics. 47 (2–3). Istituto nazionale di geofisica: 733–758.
- Chesney, Francis Rawdon (1850). The Expedition for the Survey of the Rivers Euphrates and Tigris. Longman, Brown, Green and Longmans. p. 419.
- Humphreys, Stephen (1977). From Saladin to the Mongols: The Ayyubids of Damascus, 1193–1260. SUNY Press. ISBN 978-0-87395-263-7.
- Khoury, Nuha Samir (1996). Aleppo and its Historian Kamāl al-Dīn ibn al-ʻAdīm: A Historiographical Examination of bughyat al-Ṭalab fī Taʾrīkh Ḥalab. University of Michigan.
- Lyons, M. C.; Jackson, D. E. P. (1982). Saladin: the Politics of the Holy War. Cambridge University Press. ISBN 978-0-521-31739-9.
- Setton, Kenneth S. (1969) [1955]. Baldwin, Marshall W. (ed.). A History of the Crusades: The First Hundred Years (Second ed.). The University of Wisconsin Press. ISBN 9780299048341.
