= Devehüyüğü, Oğuzeli =

Village in Gaziantep Province, Turkey

Devehüyüğü
- Neighbourhood
- Location in Turkey
- Coordinates: 36°45′21″N 37°44′0″E
- Country: Turkey
- Province: Gaziantep
- District: Oğuzeli
- Population (2022): 50
- Time zone: UTC+3 (TRT)

Devehüyüğü is a neighbourhood in the municipality and district of Oğuzeli, Gaziantep Province, Turkey. Its population is 50 (2022). The village is inhabited by Turkmens of the Bozgeyik tribe.
