= Çaybaşı, Oğuzeli =

Village in Gaziantep Province, Turkey

Çaybaşı
- Neighbourhood
- Location in Turkey
- Coordinates: 37°0′53″N 37°30′28″E
- Country: Turkey
- Province: Gaziantep
- District: Oğuzeli
- Population (2022): 551
- Time zone: UTC+3 (TRT)

Çaybaşı, historically Cağdın, is a neighbourhood in the municipality and district of Oğuzeli, Gaziantep Province, Turkey. The village is populated by Abdals of the Maya Sekenler tribe and had a population of 551 in 2022.
