= Yeniköy, Şahinbey =

Village in Gaziantep Province, Turkey

Yeniköy
- Neighbourhood
- Location in Turkey
- Coordinates: 36°51′56″N 37°22′11″E
- Country: Turkey
- Province: Gaziantep
- District: Şahinbey
- Population (2022): 113
- Time zone: UTC+3 (TRT)

Yeniköy is a neighbourhood in the municipality and district of Şahinbey, Gaziantep Province, Turkey. Its population is 113 (2022).
