= Kabacaağaç, Oğuzeli =

Village in Gaziantep Province, Turkey

Kabacaağaç
- Neighbourhood
- Location in Turkey
- Coordinates: 36°47′50″N 37°43′9″E
- Country: Turkey
- Province: Gaziantep
- District: Oğuzeli
- Population (2022): 42
- Time zone: UTC+3 (TRT)

Kabacaağaç is a neighbourhood in the municipality and district of Oğuzeli, Gaziantep Province, Turkey. Its population is 42 (2022). The village is inhabited by Turkmens of the Barak and Bozgeyik tribes.
