= Şahinbey Mülk, Şahinbey =

Village in Gaziantep Province, Turkey

Şahinbey Mülk
- Neighbourhood
- Location in Turkey
- Coordinates: 36°54′24″N 37°12′14″E
- Country: Turkey
- Province: Gaziantep
- District: Şahinbey
- Population (2022): 408
- Time zone: UTC+3 (TRT)

Şahinbey Mülk, or simply Mülk, is a neighbourhood in the municipality and district of Şahinbey, Gaziantep Province, Turkey. Its population is 408 (2022).
