= Türközü, Şahinbey =

Village in Gaziantep Province, Turkey

Türközü
- Neighbourhood
- Location in Turkey
- Coordinates: 36°50′49″N 37°20′56″E
- Country: Turkey
- Province: Gaziantep
- District: Şahinbey
- Population (2022): 50
- Time zone: UTC+3 (TRT)

Türközü is a neighbourhood in the municipality and district of Şahinbey, Gaziantep Province, Turkey. The village had a population of 50 in 2022.
