= Aşağı Güneyse, Oğuzeli =

Village in Gaziantep Province, Turkey

Aşağı Güneyse
- Neighbourhood
- Location within Turkey
- Coordinates: 36°46′6″N 37°39′24″E
- Country: Turkey
- Province: Gaziantep
- District: Oğuzeli
- Population (2022): 33
- Time zone: UTC+3 (TRT)

Aşağı Güneyse is a neighbourhood in the municipality and district of Oğuzeli, Gaziantep Province, Turkey. Its population is 33 (2022). The village is inhabited by Turkmens from the Barak and Bozgeyik tribes.
