= Acer, Oğuzeli =

Village in Gaziantep Province, Turkey

Acer
- Neighbourhood
- Location in Turkey
- Coordinates: 36°55′38″N 37°37′29″E
- Country: Turkey
- Province: Gaziantep
- District: Oğuzeli
- Population (2022): 53
- Time zone: UTC+3 (TRT)

Acer is a neighbourhood in the municipality and district of Oğuzeli, Gaziantep Province, Turkey. Its population is 53 (2022). The village is inhabited by Turkmens of the Elbegli tribe.
