= Kayalıpınar, Oğuzeli =

Village in Gaziantep Province, Turkey

Kayalıpınar
- Neighbourhood
- Location in Turkey
- Coordinates: 36°49′26″N 37°27′12″E
- Country: Turkey
- Province: Gaziantep
- District: Oğuzeli
- Population (2022): 224
- Time zone: UTC+3 (TRT)

Kayalıpınar, formerly and still informally called Mülk, is a neighbourhood in the municipality and district of Oğuzeli, Gaziantep Province, Turkey. Its population is 224 (2022). The village is inhabited by Turkmens of the Barak tribe.
