= Hatunlu, Oğuzeli =

Village in Gaziantep Province, Turkey

Hatunlu
- Neighbourhood
- Location in Turkey
- Coordinates: 36°46′55″N 37°38′44″E
- Country: Turkey
- Province: Gaziantep
- District: Oğuzeli
- Population (2022): 116
- Time zone: UTC+3 (TRT)

Hatunlu is a neighbourhood in the municipality and district of Oğuzeli, Gaziantep Province, Turkey. Its population is 116 (2022). The village is inhabited by Abdals of the Kurular tribe.
