= Beşkuyu, Şahinbey =

Village in Gaziantep Province, Turkey

Beşkuyu
- Neighbourhood
- Location in Turkey
- Coordinates: 37°6′42″N 37°8′52″E
- Country: Turkey
- Province: Gaziantep
- District: Şahinbey
- Population (2022): 427
- Time zone: UTC+3 (TRT)

Beşkuyu, historically Güvaççe, is a neighbourhood in the municipality and district of Şahinbey, Gaziantep Province, Turkey. Its population is 427 (2022).
