= Üçkubbe, Oğuzeli =

Village in Gaziantep Province, Turkey

Üçkubbe
- Neighbourhood
- Location in Turkey
- Coordinates: 36°43′14″N 37°34′18″E
- Country: Turkey
- Province: Gaziantep
- District: Oğuzeli
- Population (2022): 105
- Time zone: UTC+3 (TRT)

Üçkubbe is a neighbourhood in the municipality and district of Oğuzeli, Gaziantep Province, Turkey. Its population is 105 (2022). The village is inhabited by Turkmens of the Elbegli tribe and Abdals of the Kurular tribe.
