= Bekişli, Şahinbey =

Village in Gaziantep Province, Turkey

Bekişli
- Neighbourhood
- Location in Turkey
- Coordinates: 37°2′29″N 37°3′41″E
- Country: Turkey
- Province: Gaziantep
- District: Şahinbey
- Population (2022): 279
- Time zone: UTC+3 (TRT)

Bekişli is a neighbourhood in the municipality and district of Şahinbey, Gaziantep Province, Turkey. Its population is 279 (2022).
