= Yeşilköy, Şahinbey =

Village in Gaziantep Province, Turkey

Yeşilköy
- Neighbourhood
- Location in Turkey
- Coordinates: 36°55′22″N 37°12′36″E
- Country: Turkey
- Province: Gaziantep
- District: Şahinbey
- Population (2022): 158
- Time zone: UTC+3 (TRT)

Yeşilköy, historically Karasakal, is a neighbourhood in the municipality and district of Şahinbey, Gaziantep Province, Turkey. Its population is 158 (2022).

In late 19th century, German orientalist Martin Hartmann listed the village as a settlement of 7 houses inhabited by Turks.
