= Büyükkaracaviran, Oğuzeli =

Village in Gaziantep Province, Turkey

Büyükkaracaviran
- Neighbourhood
- Location in Turkey
- Coordinates: 36°45′51″N 37°32′36″E
- Country: Turkey
- Province: Gaziantep
- District: Oğuzeli
- Population (2022): 478
- Time zone: UTC+3 (TRT)

Büyükkaracaviran is a neighbourhood in the municipality and district of Oğuzeli, Gaziantep Province, Turkey. Its population is 478 (2022). The village is inhabited by Turkmens of various tribes. It was known as Yüreğir in the 16th century.
