= Koçaklar, Oğuzeli =

Village in Gaziantep Province, Turkey

Koçaklar
- Neighbourhood
- Location in Turkey
- Coordinates: 36°52′53″N 37°31′35″E
- Country: Turkey
- Province: Gaziantep
- District: Oğuzeli
- Population (2022): 61
- Time zone: UTC+3 (TRT)

Koçaklar is a neighbourhood in the municipality and district of Oğuzeli, Gaziantep Province, Turkey. Its population is 61 (2022). The village is inhabited by Turkmens of the Barak tribe.
