= Sergili, Oğuzeli =

Village in Gaziantep Province, Turkey

Sergili
- Neighbourhood
- Location in Turkey
- Coordinates: 36°54′33″N 37°38′30″E
- Country: Turkey
- Province: Gaziantep
- District: Oğuzeli
- Population (2022): 80
- Time zone: UTC+3 (TRT)

Sergili, historically Beledin, is a neighbourhood in the municipality and district of Oğuzeli, Gaziantep Province, Turkey. Its population is 80 (2022). The village is inhabited by Turkmens of the Barak tribe and Abdals of the Kurular tribe.
