= Belören, Oğuzeli =

Village in Gaziantep Province, Turkey

Belören
- Neighbourhood
- Location in Turkey
- Coordinates: 36°52′2″N 37°34′39″E
- Country: Turkey
- Province: Gaziantep
- District: Oğuzeli
- Population (2022): 153
- Time zone: UTC+3 (TRT)

Belören is a neighbourhood in the municipality and district of Oğuzeli, Gaziantep Province, Turkey. Its population is 153 (2022). The village is inhabited by Turkicized Arabs of the Damalha tribe and Abdals of the Maya Sekenler tribe.
