= Keçikuyusu, Oğuzeli =

Village in Gaziantep Province, Turkey

Keçikuyusu
- Neighbourhood
- Location in Turkey
- Coordinates: 36°59′38″N 37°36′37″E
- Country: Turkey
- Province: Gaziantep
- District: Oğuzeli
- Population (2022): 144
- Time zone: UTC+3 (TRT)

Keçikuyusu is a neighbourhood in the municipality and district of Oğuzeli, Gaziantep Province, Turkey. Its population is 144 (2022).
