= Kavunluk, Oğuzeli =

Village in Gaziantep Province, Turkey

Kavunluk
- Neighbourhood
- Location in Turkey
- Coordinates: 36°55′39″N 37°33′57″E
- Country: Turkey
- Province: Gaziantep
- District: Oğuzeli
- Population (2022): 107
- Time zone: UTC+3 (TRT)

Kavunluk is a neighbourhood in the municipality and district of Oğuzeli, Gaziantep Province, Turkey. Its population is 107 (2022). The village is inhabited by Turkmens of the Barak tribe.
