= Arslanlı, Oğuzeli =

Village in Gaziantep Province, Turkey

Arslanlı
- Neighbourhood
- Location in Turkey
- Coordinates: 36°45′19″N 37°30′35″E
- Country: Turkey
- Province: Gaziantep
- District: Oğuzeli
- Population (2022): 242
- Time zone: UTC+3 (TRT)

Arslanlı is a neighbourhood in the municipality and district of Oğuzeli, Gaziantep Province, Turkey. Its population is 242 (2022). The village is inhabited by Turkmens from various tribes and Abdals of the Kurular tribe.
