= Çatalçam, Oğuzeli =

Village in Gaziantep Province, Turkey

Çatalçam
- Neighbourhood
- Location in Turkey
- Coordinates: 36°46′59″N 37°42′8″E
- Country: Turkey
- Province: Gaziantep
- District: Oğuzeli
- Population (2022): 113
- Time zone: UTC+3 (TRT)

Çatalçam, historically and still informally called Şibib, is a neighbourhood in the municipality and district of Oğuzeli, Gaziantep Province, Turkey. Its population is 113 (2022). The village is inhabited by Turkmens of the Barak and Bozgeyikli tribes.
