= Doğanpınar, Oğuzeli =

Village in Gaziantep Province, Turkey

Doğanpınar
- Neighbourhood
- Location in Turkey
- Coordinates: 36°50′33″N 37°37′6″E
- Country: Turkey
- Province: Gaziantep
- District: Oğuzeli
- Population (2022): 360
- Time zone: UTC+3 (TRT)

Doğanpınar, formerly and still informally known as Haral, is a neighbourhood in the municipality and district of Oğuzeli, Gaziantep Province, Turkey. Its population is 360 (2022). The village is inhabited by Turkmens of the Barak tribe and Abdals of the Kurular tribe.
