= Karadibek, Oğuzeli =

Village in Gaziantep Province, Turkey

Karadibek
- Neighbourhood
- Location in Turkey
- Coordinates: 36°50′13″N 37°35′17″E
- Country: Turkey
- Province: Gaziantep
- District: Oğuzeli
- Population (2022): 74
- Time zone: UTC+3 (TRT)

Karadibek, historically Harnuba, is a neighbourhood in the municipality and district of Oğuzeli, Gaziantep Province, Turkey. Its population is 74 (2022). The village is inhabited by Abdals of the Kurular tribe.
