= Güveçli, Oğuzeli =

Village in Gaziantep Province, Turkey

Güveçli
- Neighbourhood
- Location in Turkey
- Coordinates: 36°51′10″N 37°40′45″E
- Country: Turkey
- Province: Gaziantep
- District: Oğuzeli
- Population (2022): 86
- Time zone: UTC+3 (TRT)

Güveçli, historically and still informally called Gemrik, is a neighbourhood in the municipality and district of Oğuzeli, Gaziantep Province, Turkey. Its population is 86 (2022). The village is inhabited by Turkmens of the Barak tribe and Abdals of the Kuyucular tribe.
