= Çimenli, Şahinbey =

Village in Gaziantep Province, Turkey

Çimenli
- Neighbourhood
- Location in Turkey
- Coordinates: 36°54′55″N 37°11′2″E
- Country: Turkey
- Province: Gaziantep
- District: Şahinbey
- Population (2022): 360
- Time zone: UTC+3 (TRT)

Çimenli, historically Cilcime, is a neighbourhood in the municipality and district of Şahinbey, Gaziantep Province, Turkey. Its population is 360 (2022).

In late 19th century, German orientalist Martin Hartmann listed the village as a settlement of 25 houses inhabited by Turks.
