= Direkli, Oğuzeli =

Village in Gaziantep Province, Turkey

Direkli
- Neighbourhood
- Location in Turkey
- Coordinates: 36°57′42″N 37°36′14″E
- Country: Turkey
- Province: Gaziantep
- District: Oğuzeli
- Population (2022): 204
- Time zone: UTC+3 (TRT)

Direkli is a neighbourhood in the municipality and district of Oğuzeli, Gaziantep Province, Turkey. Its population is 204 (2022). The village is inhabited by Turkmens of the Barak tribe.
