= Ufacık, Şahinbey =

Village in Gaziantep Province, Turkey

Ufacık
- Neighbourhood
- Location in Turkey
- Coordinates: 36°59′4″N 37°9′35″E
- Country: Turkey
- Province: Gaziantep
- District: Şahinbey
- Population (2022): 147
- Time zone: UTC+3 (TRT)

Ufacık is a neighbourhood in the municipality and district of Şahinbey, Gaziantep Province, Turkey. The village is inhabited by Turkmens and had a population of 147 in 2022.
