= Duruköy, Oğuzeli =

Village in Gaziantep Province, Turkey

Duruköy
- Neighbourhood
- Location in Turkey
- Coordinates: 36°50′15″N 37°30′22″E
- Country: Turkey
- Province: Gaziantep
- District: Oğuzeli
- Population (2022): 63
- Time zone: UTC+3 (TRT)

Duruköy, formerly and still informally known as Humeyli, is a neighbourhood in the municipality and district of Oğuzeli, Gaziantep Province, Turkey. Its population is 63 (2022). The village is inhabited by Turkmens of the Barak tribe.
