= Yazılı, Oğuzeli =

Village in Gaziantep Province, Turkey

Yazılı
- Neighbourhood
- Location in Turkey
- Coordinates: 36°50′49″N 37°27′36″E
- Country: Turkey
- Province: Gaziantep
- District: Oğuzeli
- Population (2022): 593
- Time zone: UTC+3 (TRT)

Yazılı, historically and still informally called Tüm, is a neighbourhood in the municipality and district of Oğuzeli, Gaziantep Province, Turkey. Its population is 593 (2022). The village is inhabited by Abdals of the Kara Hacılar tribe.
