= Ambarcık, Oğuzeli =

Village in Gaziantep Province, Turkey

Ambarcık
- Neighbourhood
- Location in Turkey
- Coordinates: 36°48′48″N 37°31′46″E
- Country: Turkey
- Province: Gaziantep
- District: Oğuzeli
- Population (2022): 96
- Time zone: UTC+3 (TRT)

Ambarcık is a neighbourhood in the municipality and district of Oğuzeli, Gaziantep Province, Turkey. Its population is 96 (2022).
