= Yeni Cumhuriyet, Oğuzeli =

Village in Gaziantep Province, Turkey

Yeni Cumhuriyet
- Neighbourhood
- Location in Turkey
- Coordinates: 36°47′55″N 37°33′26″E
- Country: Turkey
- Province: Gaziantep
- District: Oğuzeli
- Population (2022): 126
- Time zone: UTC+3 (TRT)

Yeni Cumhuriyet is a neighbourhood in the municipality and district of Oğuzeli, Gaziantep Province, Turkey. Its population is 126 (2022).
