= Aşağı Yeniyapan, Oğuzeli =

Village in Gaziantep Province, Turkey

Aşağı Yeniyapan
- Neighbourhood
- Location in Turkey
- Coordinates: 36°46′56″N 37°37′4″E
- Country: Turkey
- Province: Gaziantep
- District: Oğuzeli
- Population (2022): 250
- Time zone: UTC+3 (TRT)

Aşağı Yeniyapan is a neighbourhood in the municipality and district of Oğuzeli, Gaziantep Province, Turkey. Its population is 250 (2022).
