= Taşçanak, Oğuzeli =

Village in Gaziantep Province, Turkey

Taşçanak
- Neighbourhood
- Location in Turkey
- Coordinates: 36°50′9″N 37°41′4″E
- Country: Turkey
- Province: Gaziantep
- District: Oğuzeli
- Population (2022): 51
- Time zone: UTC+3 (TRT)

Taşçanak, historically and still informally called Vartanoz, is a neighbourhood in the municipality and district of Oğuzeli, Gaziantep Province, Turkey. The village is inhabited by Turkmens of the Barak tribe and had a population of 51 in 2022.

== Etymology ==
The original name of the village derives from Vartan, an Armenian name.
