= Tüzel, Oğuzeli =

Village in Gaziantep Province, Turkey

Tüzel
- Neighbourhood
- Location in Turkey
- Coordinates: 36°48′39″N 37°29′57″E
- Country: Turkey
- Province: Gaziantep
- District: Oğuzeli
- Population (2022): 58
- Time zone: UTC+3 (TRT)

Tüzel is a neighbourhood in the municipality and district of Oğuzeli, Gaziantep Province, Turkey. Its population is 58 (2022). The village is inhabited by Turkmens of the Barak tribe and Abdals of the Maya Sekenler tribe.
