= Bozca, Şahinbey =

Village in Gaziantep Province, Turkey

Bozca
- Neighbourhood
- Location in Turkey
- Coordinates: 36°52′6″N 37°23′28″E
- Country: Turkey
- Province: Gaziantep
- District: Şahinbey
- Population (2022): 115
- Time zone: UTC+3 (TRT)

Bozca is a neighbourhood in the municipality and district of Şahinbey, Gaziantep Province, Turkey. Its population is 115 (2022).
