= Dokuzyol, Oğuzeli =

Village in Gaziantep Province, Turkey

Dokuzyol
- Neighbourhood
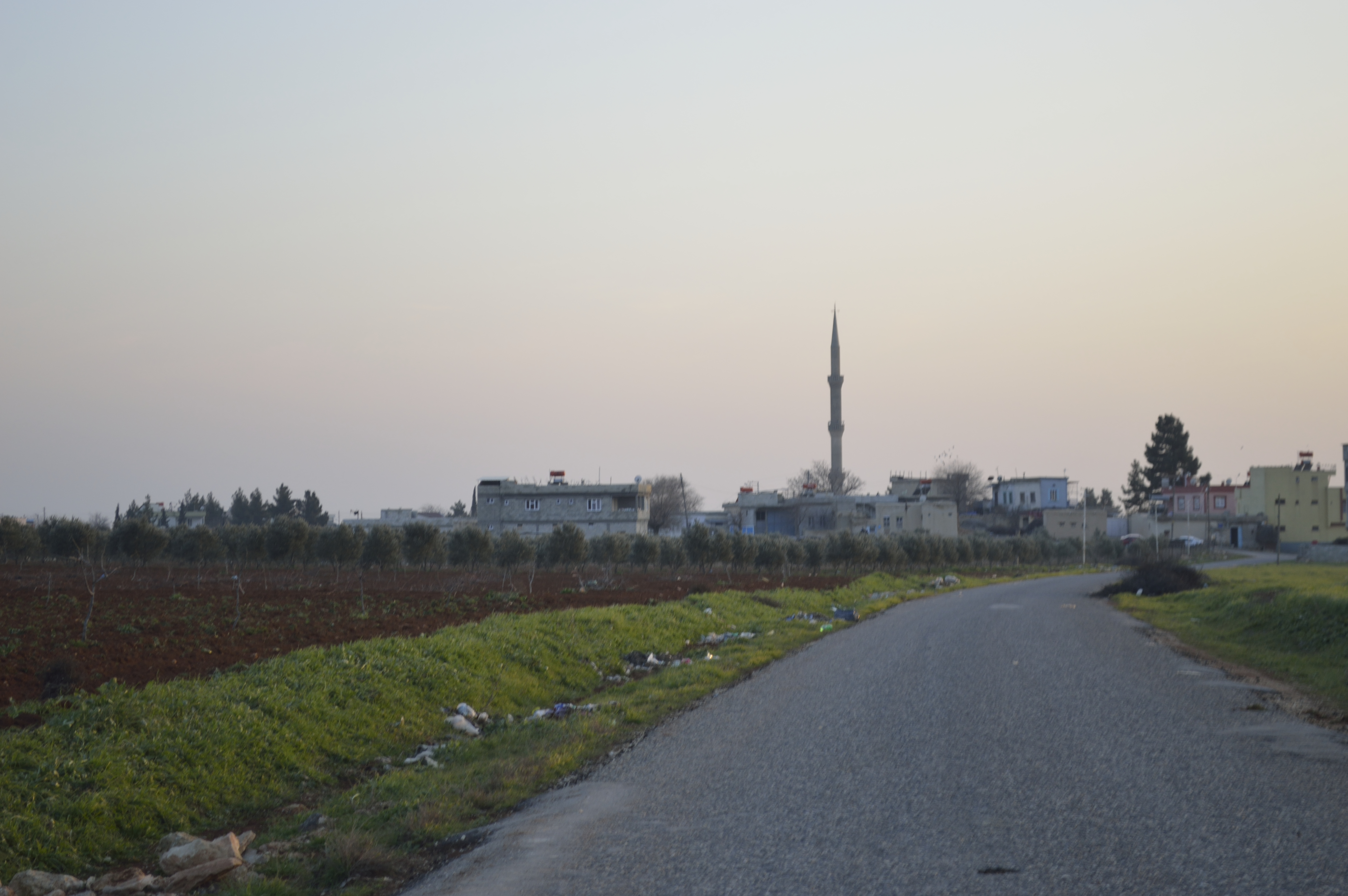
- The silhouette of Dokuzyol

- Location within Turkey
- Coordinates: 36°53′41″N 37°39′20″E
- Country: Turkey
- Province: Gaziantep
- District: Oğuzeli
- Population (2022): 373
- Time zone: UTC+3 (TRT)

Dokuzyol, historically Uruş, is a neighbourhood in the municipality and district of Oğuzeli, Gaziantep Province, Turkey. Its population is 373 (2022). The village is inhabited by Turkmens of the Barak and Bozgeyikli tribes as well as Abdals of the Kuyucular tribe.
