= Çevreli, Şahinbey =

Village in Gaziantep Province, Turkey

Çevreli
- Neighbourhood
- Location in Turkey
- Coordinates: 37°2′9″N 37°4′33″E
- Country: Turkey
- Province: Gaziantep
- District: Şahinbey
- Population (2022): 100
- Time zone: UTC+3 (TRT)

Çevreli, historically Burtu, is a neighbourhood in the municipality and district of Şahinbey, Gaziantep Province, Turkey. Its population is 100 (2022).
