= Şahinbey =

- District and municipality
- Logo

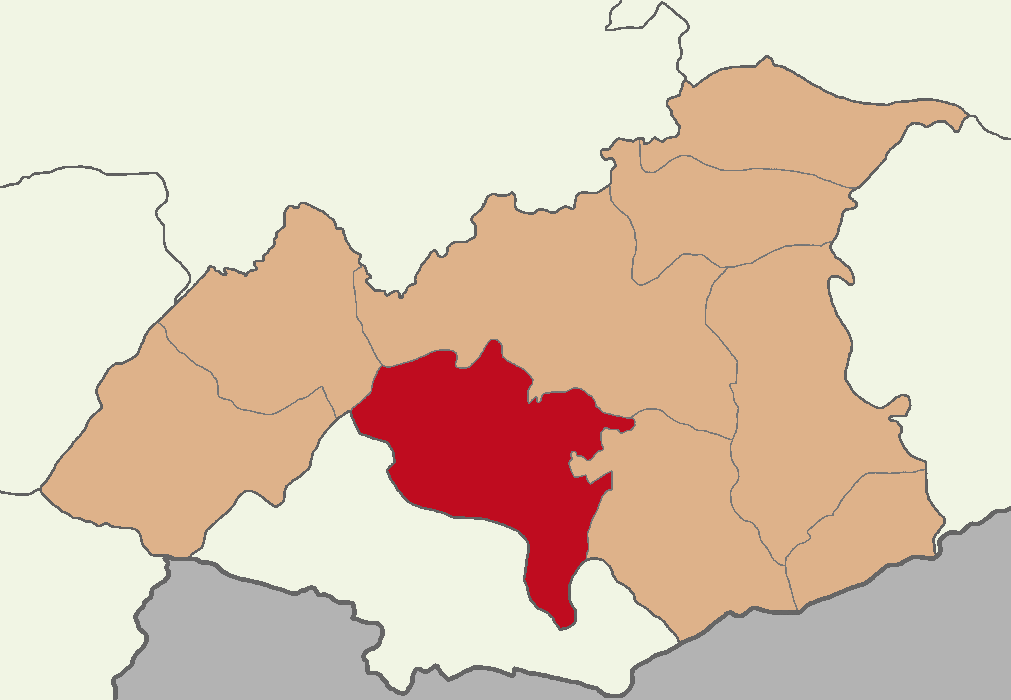
- Map showing Şahinbey District in Gaziantep Province

- Location in Turkey
- Coordinates: 36°54′24″N 37°12′15″E
- Country: Turkey
- Province: Gaziantep

Government
  - Mayor: Mehmet Tahmazoğlu (AKP)
- Area: 960 km^{2} (370 sq mi)
- Population (2022): 941,055
  - Density: 980/km^{2} (2,500/sq mi)
- Time zone: UTC+3 (TRT)
- Area code: 0342
- Website: www.sahinbey.bel.tr

Şahinbey is a municipality and district of Gaziantep Province, Turkey. Its area is 960 km^{2}, and its population is 941,055 (2022). It was named after Şahin Bey (1877–1920), a Turkish National Movement commander. It covers the southern part of the agglomeration of Gaziantep and the adjacent countryside. It is the location of a large amount of student housing for the public University of Gaziantep, as well as the site of two private universities: Zirve and Hasan Kalyoncu.

== Composition ==
There are 181 neighbourhoods in Şahinbey District:

- 23 Nisan
- 25 Aralık
- 60. Yıl
- 75. Yıl
- Abdülhamit Han
- Akbayır
- Akbulut
- Akkent
- Akpınar
- Akyazı
- Akyol
- Alaybey
- Alibaba
- Alleben
- Almalı
- Aydınbaba
- Bağlarbaşı
- Bahçelievler
- Barak
- Barış
- Bayramlı
- Bekirbey
- Bekişli
- Belenköy
- Beşkuyu
- Beştepe
- Bey
- Beyazlar
- Beydili
- Binevler
- Bostancı
- Bostancık
- Boyacı
- Bozca
- Bozoklar
- Bülbülzade
- Burç Esentepe
- Burç Karakuyu
- Cabi
- Çağdaş
- Çamlıca
- Çamtepe
- Çapalı
- Cebeler
- Cemal Gürsel
- Cengiz Topel
- Cevizli
- Çevreli
- Çimenli
- Çöreklik
- Çubukdiken
- Cumhuriyet
- Damlacık
- Deniz
- Deredüzü
- Doğanca
- Dokur
- Dumlupınar
- Durantaş
- Düztepe
- Ekinli
- Ertuğrul Gazi
- Eyüpoğlu
- Fidanlık
- Fırat
- Gazitepe
- Geneyik
- Gerciğin
- Geylani
- Güllüce
- Gülpınar
- Gümüştekin
- Güneş
- Güneykent
- Güzelvadi
- Hacıarslan
- Hacıköprü
- Hacıköy
- Hoşgör
- İbn-i Sina
- İnönü
- İsmetpaşa
- İstiklal
- Kabarcık
- Kahvelipınar
- Kale
- Kaleboynu
- Kanalıcı
- Kapçağız
- Karaçomak
- Karagöz
- Karatarla
- Karataş
- Karayılan
- Kavaklık
- Kavşak
- Kayakent
- Kazıklı
- Kepenek
- Kerer
- Kıbrıs
- Kılınçoğlu
- Killik
- Kolejtepe
- Konak
- Kozanlı
- Kozluca
- Küçükkızılhisar
- Külecik
- Kumruhamurkesen
- Kurbanbaba
- Kürüm
- Kuşçu
- Malazgirt
- Mavikent
- Mimar Sinan
- Morcalı
- Muhacirosman
- Narlıca
- Narlıtepe
- Nuripazarbaşı
- Ocaklar
- Öğretmenevleri
- Onur
- Ortaklar
- Osmanlı
- Ozanlı
- Pancarlı
- Perilikaya
- Saçaklı
- Şahinbey
- Şahinbey Mülk
- Şahintepe
- Şahveli
- Sarıbaşak
- Sarıkaya
- Sarısalkım
- Sarıt
- Savcılı
- Seferpaşa
- Şekeroğlu
- Selçuklu
- Şenyurt
- Serince
- Serinevler
- Sırasöğüt
- Süleymanşah
- Sultanselim
- Suyabatmaz
- Tekstilkent
- Tışlaki
- Tiyekli
- Töreli
- Türkmenler
- Türközü
- Türktepe
- Üçoklar
- Ufacık
- Uğurtepe
- Ulaş
- Ulucanlar
- Ünaldı
- Vatan
- Yağdöver
- Yamaçtepe
- Yavuzlar
- Yaycı
- Yaylacık
- Yazıbağı
- Yazıcık
- Yeditepe
- Yeniköy
- Yeşilevler
- Yeşilkent
- Yeşilköy
- Yeşilpınar
- Yeşilyurt
- Yığmatepe
- Yoğuntaş
- Yukarıbayır
- Zeytinli

== Sport ==
Two women's football clubs are based in Şahinbey. The 2006-established Gazikentspor playing in the Women's Second League and the 2021-founded Gaziantep Asyaspor, which was promoted to the Women's Super League in the [-2023–24 season.
