= Ocak (Alevism) =

Descendants of the dedes in Alevism and Bektashism

Ocak or Odjak (Turkish: Ocak, Kurdish: Ocax, Azerbaijani: Ocaq, lit. 'hearth') is the particular religious community which adherents of Alevism belong to. In Alevi tradition, each ocak is led by a dede, who is assumed to be descended from sayyids.

== Structuring ==
In traditional Alevi society, ocaks were historically passed down patrilineally. Each ocak traced its ancestry to a revered dede (religious leader or saint). However, there is a significant exception to this rule—particularly relevant in mixed marriages, where the mother is Alevi and the father is not (e.g., Sunni, non-religious, or from outside the Alevi tradition). In such cases, Alevi communities often recognize the mother’s ocak as the rightful spiritual lineage for the child.

Ocaks are interconnected and there is a familial connection between them. At the top of the family tree is Haji Bektash Veli. There are people descended from every ocak. The Dedes which are the older sons of ocaks are in a higher position then the younger sons. This hierarchical structure is part of the "Hand in hand, Haqq" mentality.

Since the mid-20th century, large-scale rural-to-urban migration among Alevi communities has significantly diminished the traditional role of ocaks. With urbanization, the socially embedded “dede–talip” relationships that sustained ocak networks largely fragmented, and many ocak-based rituals and communal functions were either abandoned or reconfigured within new institutional settings such as cemevis and cultural associations. In both urban and diaspora contexts, these shifts have fostered more flexible understandings of Alevi identity: many individuals now identify as Alevi on cultural or ethnic grounds, including through either an Alevi mother or father, reflecting the declining relevance of strict ocak affiliation. Consequently, scholars today argue that ocaks have lost much of their former social and ritual authority, functioning increasingly as symbolic markers rather than central institutions in contemporary Alevi life.

There are Dede ocaks in Turkey whose hierarchy has not been established due to the lack of research. The most well-known example is the Şücaeddin Veli.

== See also ==
- Alevism
- Alevi
- Dede (religious figure)
- Haji Bektash Veli
- Sayyid
- Cemevi
- Bektashism
