= Gaziantep Province =

Province of Turkey

Gaziantep Province Gaziantep ili
- Province and metropolitan municipality
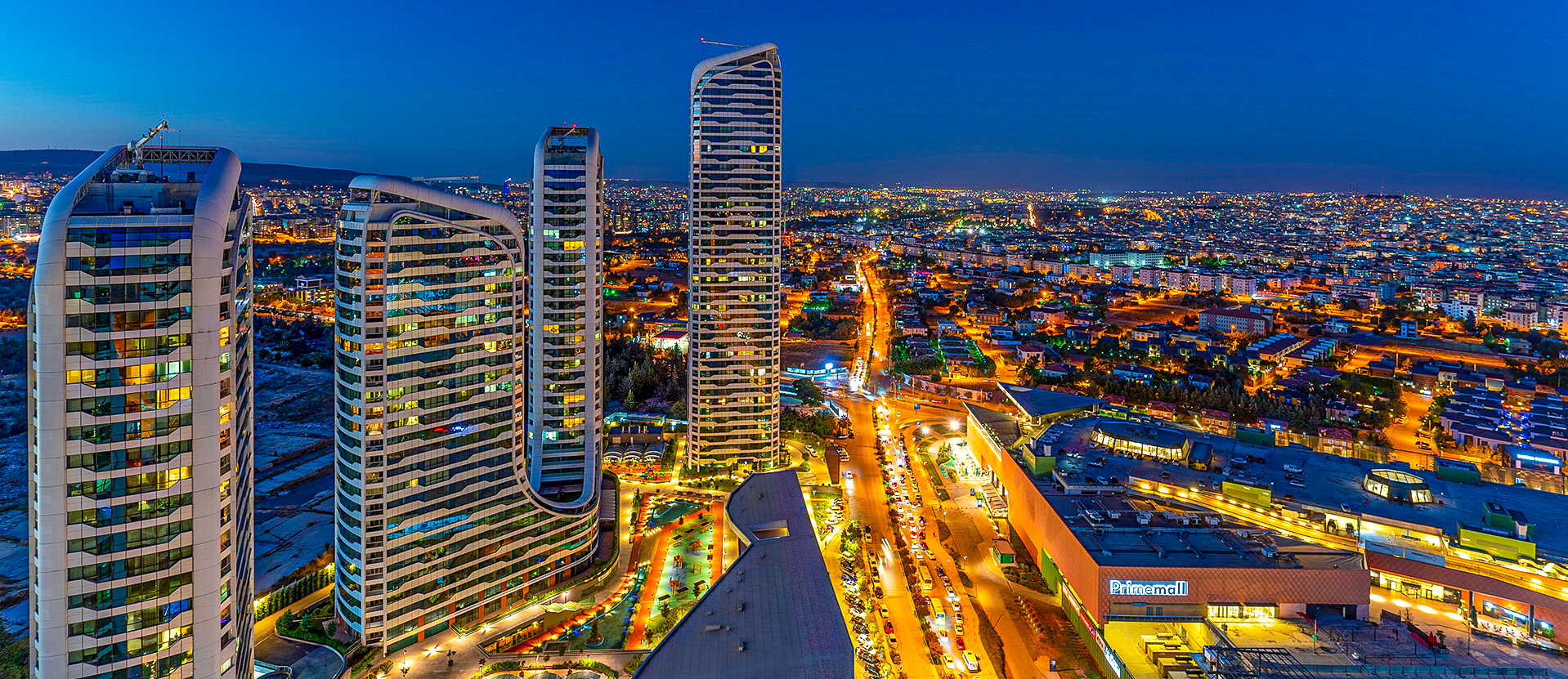
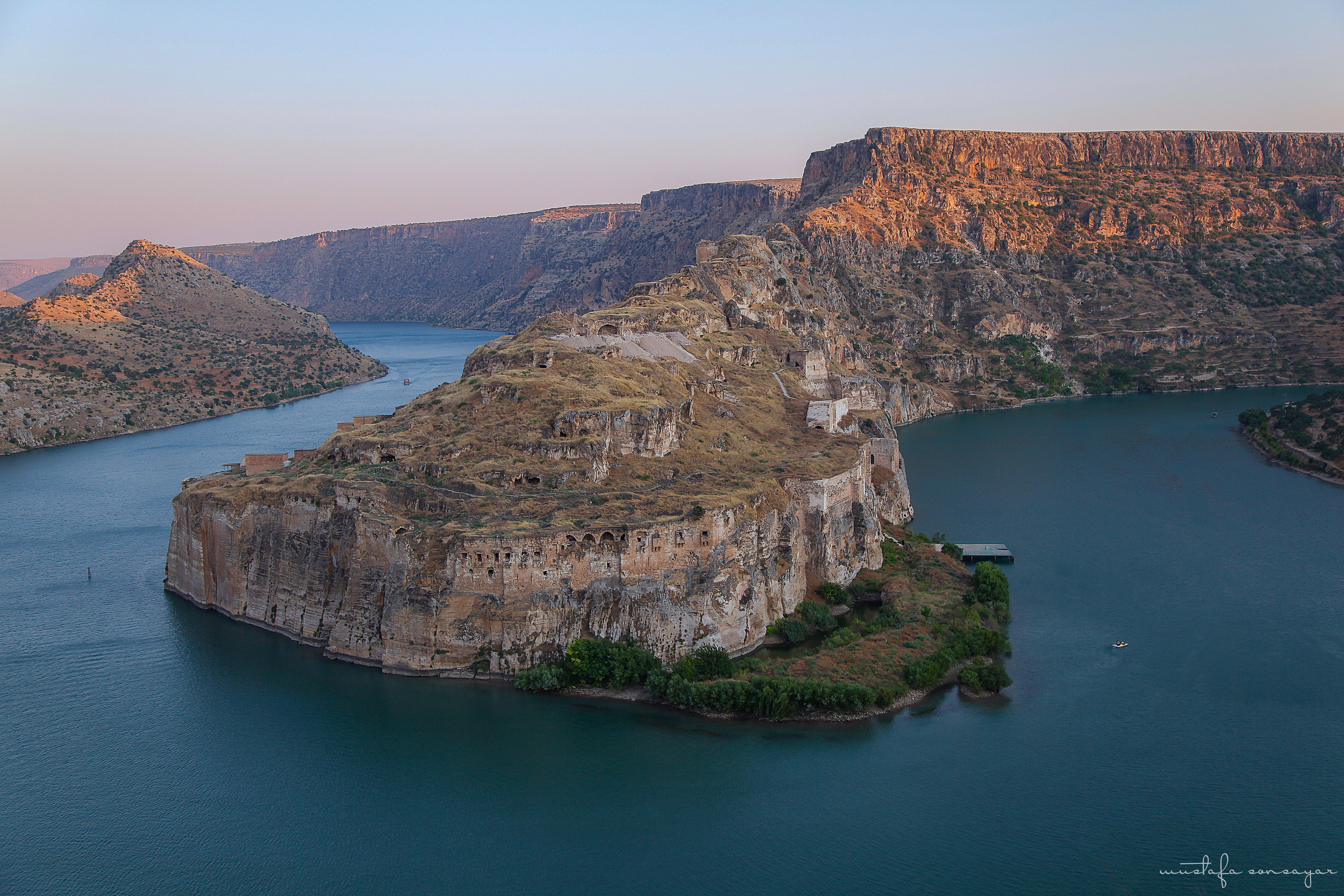
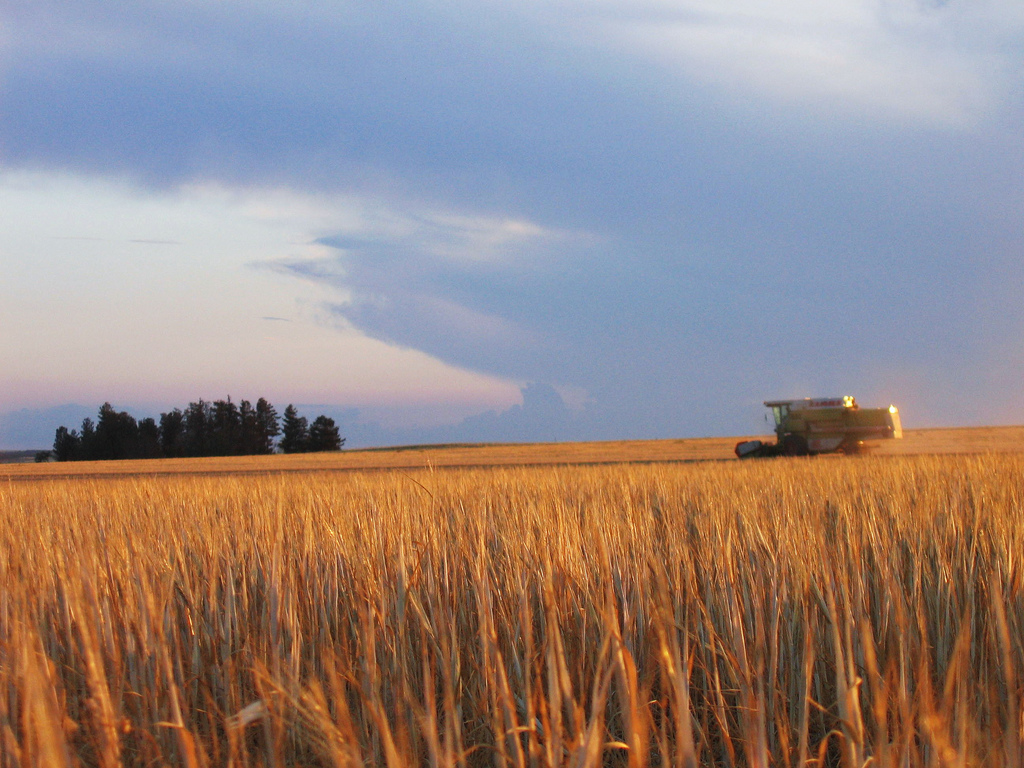
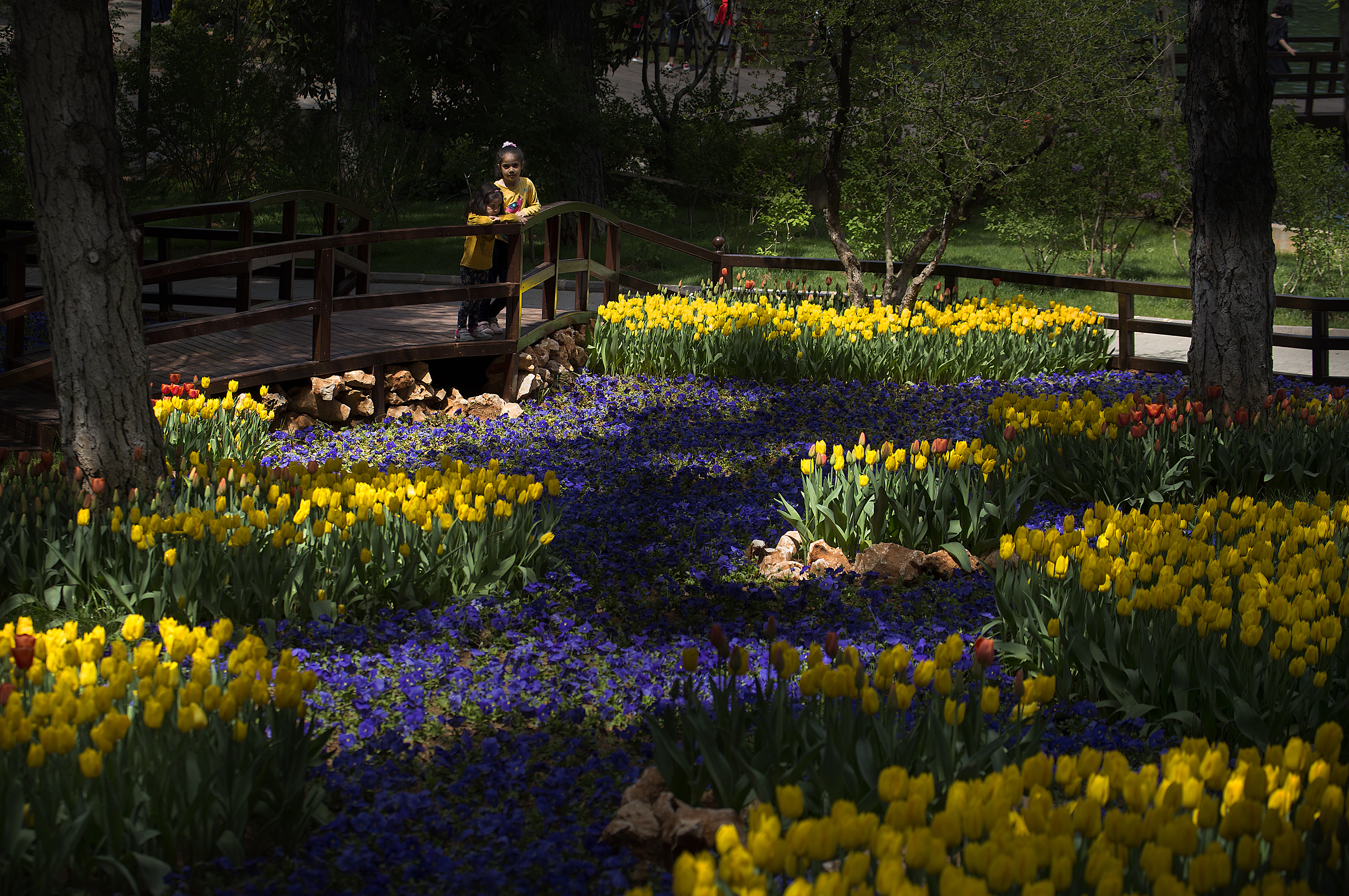
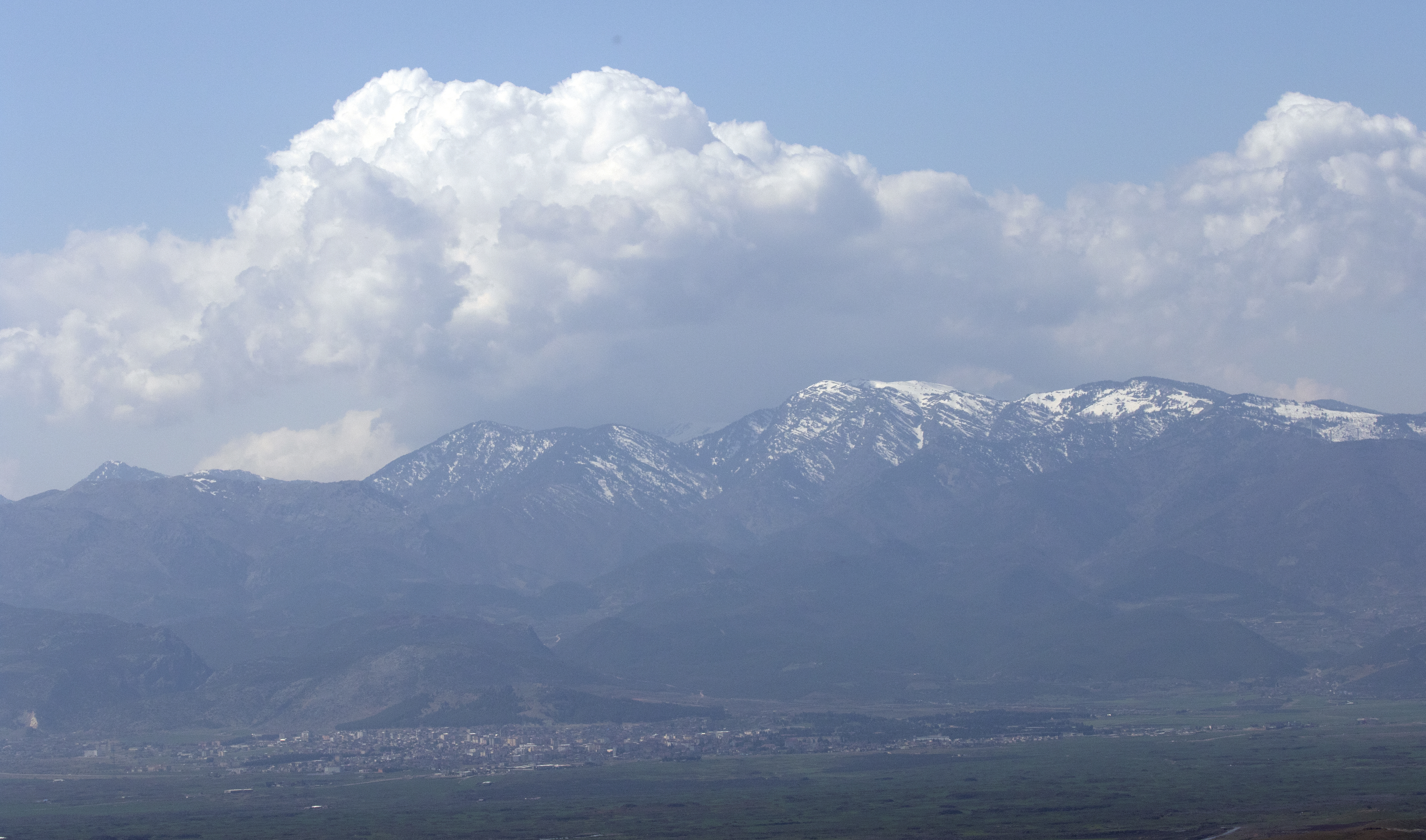
- Clockwise from top: The city of Gaziantep, a barley field near the Syrian border, Amanos Mountains, Dülükbaba Park, Rumkale

- Location of the province within Turkey
- Coordinates: 37°02′26″N 37°18′25″E
- Country: Turkey
- Seat: Gaziantep

Government
  - Mayor: Fatma Şahin (AKP)
  - Vali: Kemal Çeber
- Area: 6,803 km^{2} (2,627 sq mi)
- Population (2022): 2,154,051
  - Density: 316.6/km^{2} (820.1/sq mi)
- Time zone: UTC+3 (TRT)
- Area code: 0342
- Website: www.gaziantep.bel.tr www.gaziantep.gov.tr

Gaziantep Province (Turkish: Gaziantep ili) is a province and metropolitan municipality in south-central Turkey. It is located in the westernmost part of Turkey's Southeastern Anatolia Region and partially in the Mediterranean Region. Its area is 6,803 km^{2}, and its population is 2,154,051 (2022). Its capital is the city of Gaziantep. It neighbours Adıyaman to the northeast, Şanlıurfa to the east, Syria and Kilis to the south, Hatay to the southwest, Osmaniye to the west and Kahramanmaraş to the northwest.

An important trading center since ancient times, the province is also one of Turkey's major manufacturing zones, and its agriculture is dominated by the cultivation of pistachio nuts.

In ancient times, first under the power of Yamhad, then the Hittites and later the Assyrians controlled the region. It saw much fighting during the Crusades, and Saladin won a key battle there in 1183. After World War I and the Ottoman Empire's disintegration, it was invaded by the forces of the French Third Republic during the Turkish War of Independence. It was returned to Turkish control after the Treaty of Lausanne was signed, formally ending hostilities between Turkey and the Allies of World War I.

Originally known as Antep, the title gazi (meaning veteran in Turkish) was added to the province's and the provincial capital's name in 1921, due to its population's actions during the Turkish War of Independence.

Kilis Province was part of Gaziantep Province until it separated in 1994. Turks are the majority in the province although there is a substantial Kurdish population.

== Geography ==
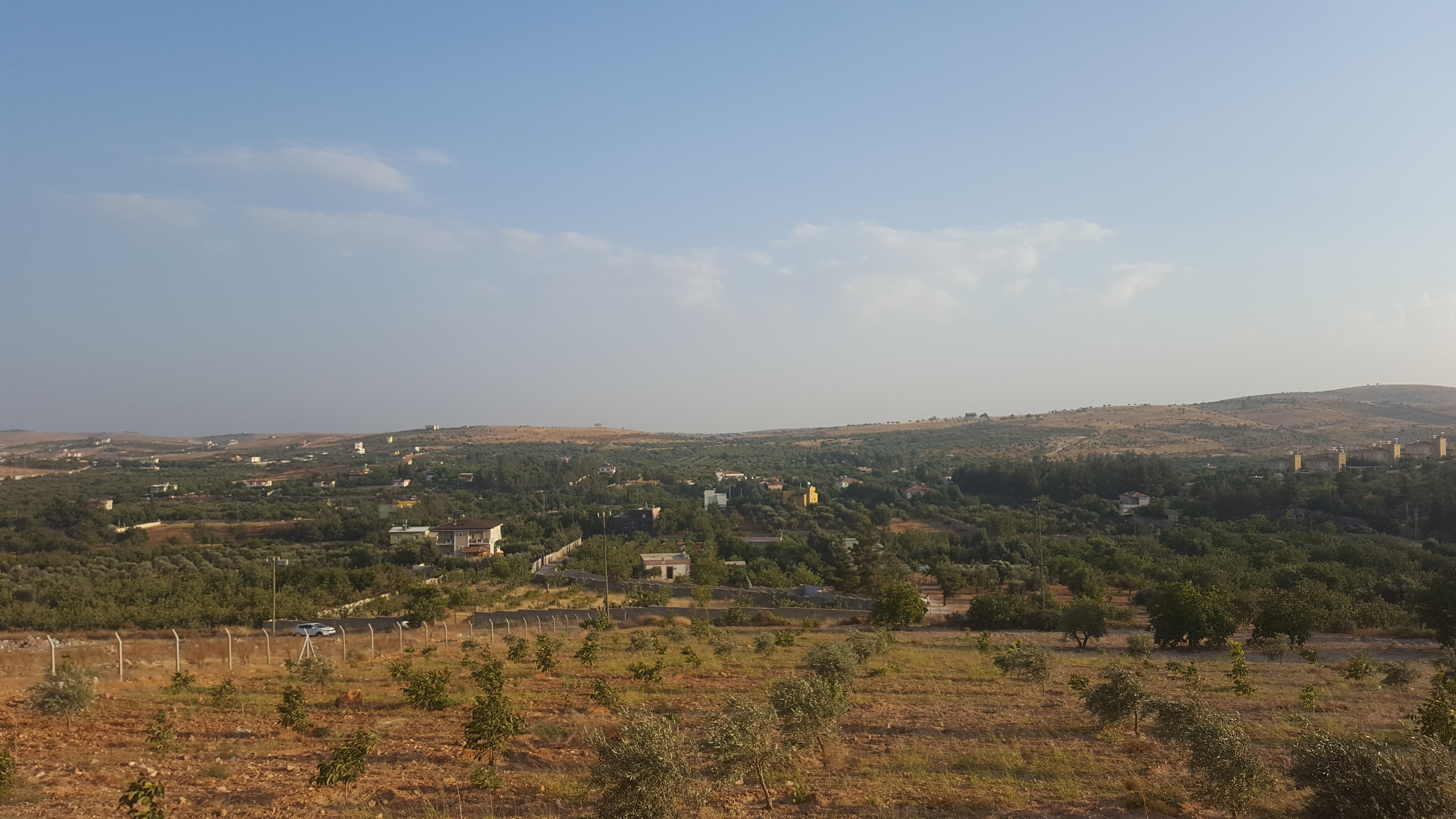
Landscape of the province of Gaziantep

Gaziantep is traversed by the northeasterly lines of equal latitude and longitude.

=== Geology ===
Two major active geological faults meet in western Gaziantep near the border with adjoining Osmaniye Province: the Dead Sea Transform and the East Anatolian Fault. These represent the tectonic boundary between the northward-moving Arabian Plate to the east, and the converging African and Eurasian Plates to the west.

On February 6, 2023, at 04:17 TRT (01:17 UTC), a moment magnitude ( M_{w}) 7.8 earthquake occurred in Gaziantep Province on the East Anatolian Fault, which caused widespread damage and loss of life. The epicenter was 37 km (23 mi) west-northwest of the city of Gaziantep. At 13:24, it was followed by an M_{w}7.7 earthquake.

=== Climate ===
Köppen map of Gaziantep Province and surrounding regions:
- BSh
- Csa
- Dsa
- Dsb

=== Districts ===
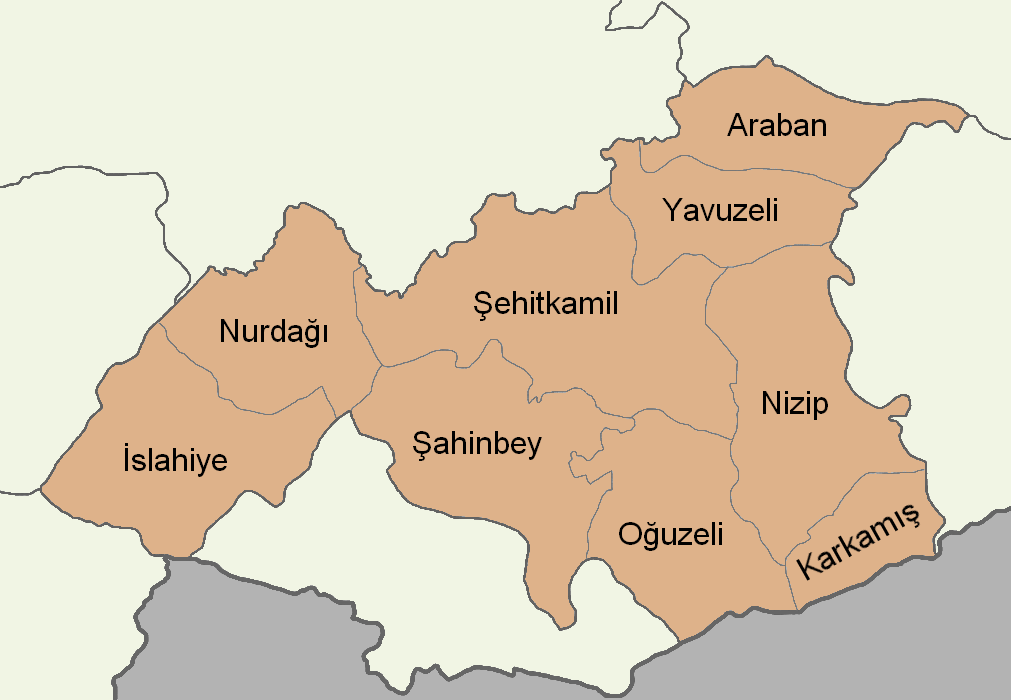
Map of the province with the demarcations of the districts

There are nine districts as listed below:

- Araban
- İslahiye
- Karkamış
- Nizip
- Nurdağı
- Oğuzeli
- Şahinbey
- Şehitkamil
- Yavuzeli

The city of Gaziantep encompasses Şahinbey and Şehitkamil districts; İslahiye and Nurdağı districts form the western part of the province, while the remaining districts lie to the east of Gaziantep city.

== Demographics ==
Historical population
Year	Pop.	±% p.a.
1927	213,499	—
1935	283,506	+3.61%
1940	306,906	+1.60%
1950	328,343	+0.68%
1960	434,579	+2.84%
1970	606,540	+3.39%
1980	808,697	+2.92%
1990	1,140,594	+3.50%
2000	1,285,249	+1.20%
2010	1,700,763	+2.84%
2020	2,101,157	+2.14%
2022	2,154,051	+1.25%
Source: Turkstat

== See also ==
- List of populated places in Gaziantep Province
- Yesemek Quarry and Sculpture Workshop
