= Mütercim Asım =

Lexicographer and historian (1755–1819)

- Born: 1755; Aintab, Ottoman Empire
- Died: 27 November 1819 (aged 63–64); Constantinople, Ottoman Empire

Sayyid Ahmed Asim Efendi (1755 – 27 November 1819), commonly known as Mütercim Asım, was an Ottoman lexicographer and historian.

== Early life and education ==
He was born in Aintab to Mehmed Cenani Efendi, a famous poet and scholar, who was the head scribe of the local court. His grandfather was poet Hulusi Efendi, who descended from Sheikh Osman, with roots in the city of Samarkand (modern-day Uzbekistan). His other ancestors included Sheikh Ahmed Shihabi Efendi, the author of Nazmu'l-leal, and poet Sheikh Ahmed Efendi from the village of Çarpın. Ahmed Asim received a good education in his hometown of Aintab. He learned Arabic, calligraphy, and the Islamic sciences. He was introduced to literature and poetry through the mentorship of his father and Ruhi Mustafa Efendi of Kilis. He was trained as the scribe of the court of Aintab.

== Career ==
Between 1788–89, Asim worked as the scribe of the divan of Nuri Mehmed Pasha, who was Aintab's muqata'ah mutasarrif. Nuri Mehmed Pasha was later involved in a conflict with the Ottoman authorities, who decreed his execution. During this period, Asim lost much of his wealth, although he came from an affluent family. He was especially distraught by the ransacking of his library. Asim moved to Kilis and stayed there for eight months. Due to economic issues, he parted ways with his siblings and family by sending them back to Aintab and headed to Constantinople in 1789–90.

Between the years 1791 and 1797, Ahmed Asim translated the work Tibyân-ı Nâfi‘ der Terceme-i Burhân-i Kātı‘ into Turkish. He presented it to the Ottoman Sultan Selim III, who was content with Asim's work so that he appointed Asim as sefâret, vekāyi‘ tahriri ve nâmenüvislik and also hareket-i dâhil at a madrasa (school). Asim was also provided a home and a 300 kurush salary by the sultan. However, according to Asim's personal account in his work Tarih, he was sent to the kaza of Pravadi (modern-day Bulgaria) and was initially paid 50 to 60 kurush, which he claimed to have gradually decreased to none. Asim's home was later decimated by fire, but he received accommodations from Selim III once again.

In 1798, Asim composed the work Tuhfe-i Âsım, a guide to learn Arabic, taking inspiration from Sünbülzade Vehbi's Tuhfe-i Vehbî. Some time after, Asim translated the Arabic text, Naẓmü's-sîre (also known as Siyer-i Halebî), by Ibrahim bin Mustafa al-Mudari of Aleppo and presented it to Selim III.

After serving as the kadi of Thessaloniki, he retired to Constantinople, where he died in 1819.

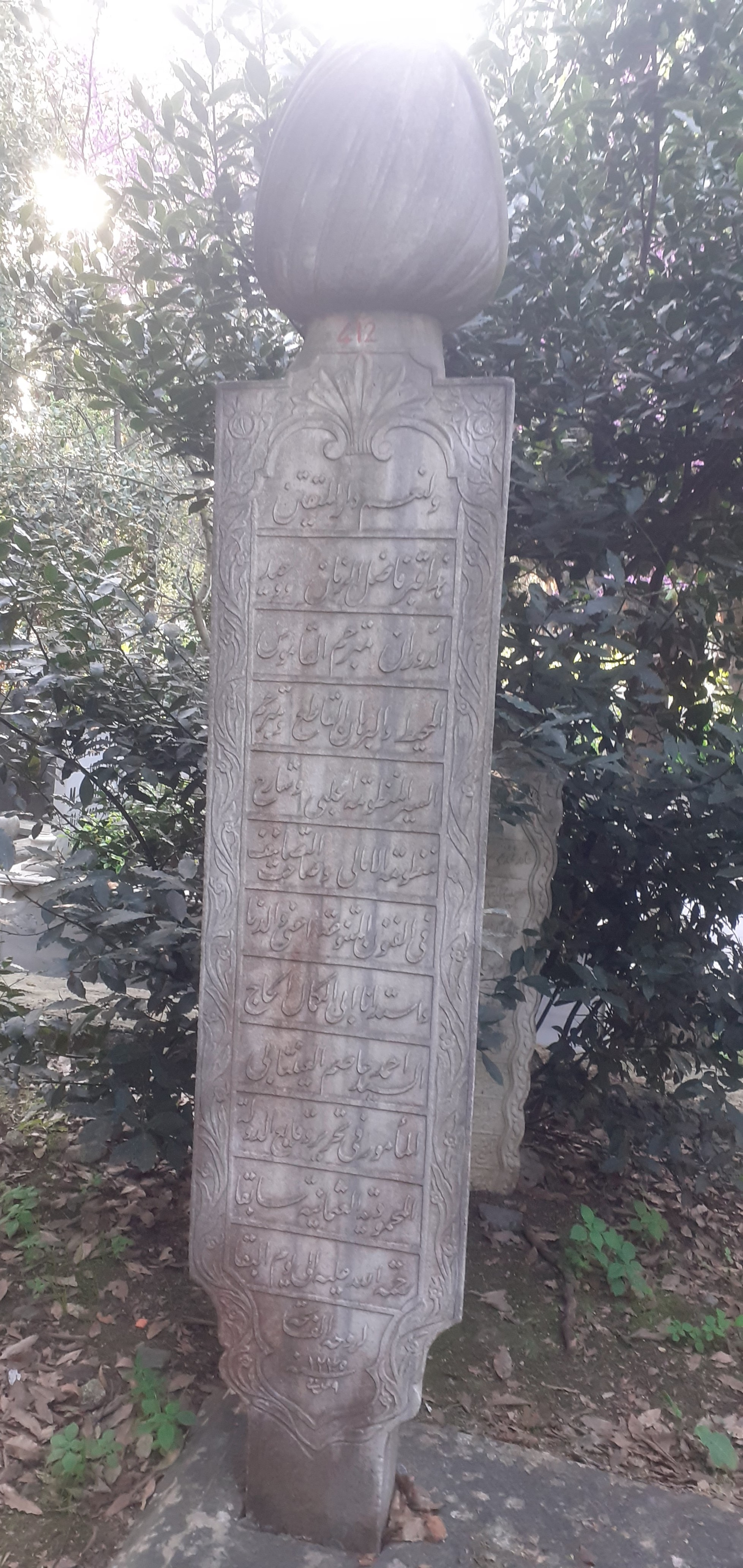
Mütercim Asım's grave at Karacaahmet Cemetery.

== Bibliography ==
- Kaçalin, Mustafa S. (2006). "Mütercim Âsım Efendi". TDV Encyclopedia of Islam, Vol. 32 (el-Münci̇d – Nasi̇h) (in Turkish). Istanbul: Presidency of Religious Affairs, Centre for Islamic Studies. pp. 200–202. ISBN 978-975-389-454-8.
- Yazıcı, Tahsin (2011). "ʿĀṣem Efendī". In Yarshater, Ehsan (ed.). Encyclopædia Iranica (Online ed.). Encyclopædia Iranica Foundation. pp. 740–741.
