= Roman mausoleums of Araban =

Mausoleums in southeastern Turkey

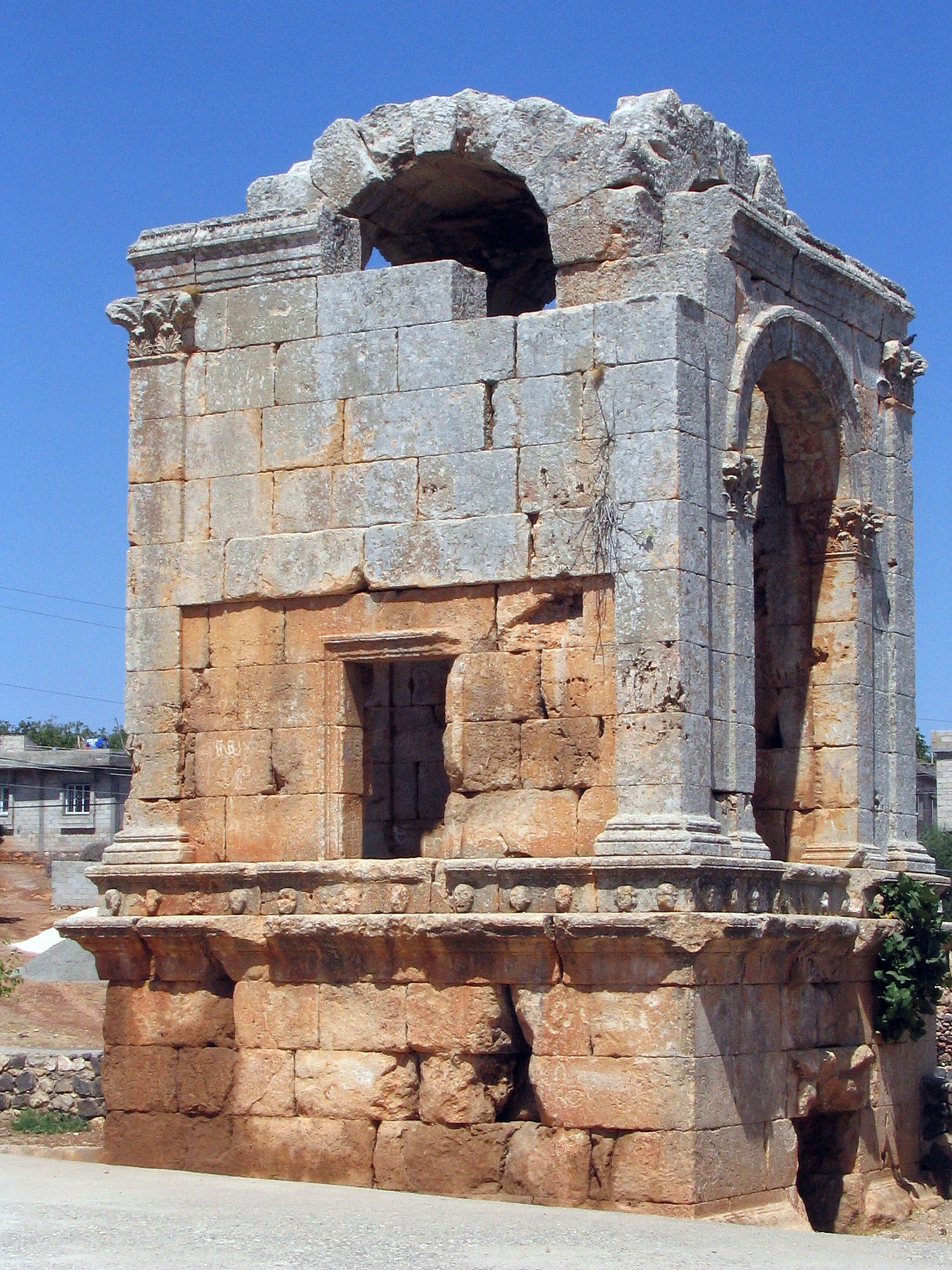
Roman monumental tomb in Elif near Gaziantep, Türkiye

The Roman mausoleums of Araban (Turkish: Araban anıt mezarları) are three mausoleums of the Roman Empire found in three different villages, namely in Elif, Hasanoğlu and Hisar, of Araban district of Gaziantep Province, southeastern Turkey. The mausoleums are dated back to late 2nd century or early 3rd century AD.

These mausoleums are located close to the junction of historic military and trade routes, which were in north-south direction parallel to Euphrates and perpendicular to it in the west-east direction. The three mausoleums are situated very close to each other. They were built for wealthy, noble persons or high-ranked civil servants or military officers.

== Mausoleum of Elif ==
The mausoleum is situated in the middle school's yard at Elif, which is a village of Gaziantep Province's Araban district. It is 30 km (19 mi) east of Araban town and 70 km (43 mi) northeast of Gaziantep. Elif was the ancient Roman settlement of Sugga, which was located close to the junction of the historic roads Doliche-Samosata and Zeugma-Samosata.

The mausoleum is built of ashlar, and consists of a high basement, a body and a vaulted roof. While the western, southern and eastern facades of the mausoleum are arched, the northern facade is closed by a wall put up having a rectangular door opening in its underside. A decorative belt between the basement and the body showing heads of mythologic monster Medusa, who turned gazing people upon her to stone, surrounds the mausoleum. The mausoleum body has four columns of Corinthian order carrying arches. The form of the structure is unknown However, it is considered from the remains that the roof was vaulted. For the date of the mausoleum's construction late 2nd century or early 3rd century is given.

The mausoleum underwent an almost one-year long restoration, which was completed in October 2013.

37°22′39″N 37°52′48″E

== Mausoleum of Hasanoğlu ==
The mausoleum is situated inside the village of Hasanoğlu, which is located about 4 km (2.5 mi) west of Elif. The Mausoleum of Hasanoğlu is built in ashlar on a square-plan basement. Massive pillars on the southern and western facades carry arches. The northern and eastern facades completely as well as half of the basement are demolished. The mausoleum is dated to late 2nd century or early 3rd century.

37°23′06″N 37°51′13″E

== Mausoleum of Hisar ==
Hisar village is located about 3 km (1.9 mi) east of Elif on the west bank of Euphrates. The mausoleum in Hisar is situated inside the village. It was built of ashlar on a flat platform. Four columns of Corinthian order on each corner of the square-plan basement of 4 m × 4 m (13 ft × 13 ft) carry a pyramid-formed roof. There is square-formed column capital of Corinthian order at the top of the pyramidal roof. It is believed that a statue, which is no more existent today, was standing on the capital. The plain designed, 10 m (33 ft) high mausoleum is otherwise completely intact. The date of the building is late 2nd century or early 3rd century.

37°23′10″N 37°55′01″E
