= Yamaçoba, Şehitkamil =

Village in Gaziantep Province, Turkey

Yamaçoba
- Neighbourhood
- Location in Turkey
- Coordinates: 37°10′19″N 37°5′14″E
- Country: Turkey
- Province: Gaziantep
- District: Şehitkamil
- Population (2022): 1,029
- Time zone: UTC+3 (TRT)

Yamaçoba is a neighbourhood in the municipality and district of Şehitkamil, Gaziantep Province, Turkey. Its population is 1,029 (2022). The village is inhabited by Turkmens of the Jerid and Qiziq tribes.
