= Koçlu, Şehitkamil =

Village in Gaziantep Province, Turkey

Koçlu
- Neighbourhood
- Location in Turkey
- Coordinates: 37°18′27″N 37°25′45″E
- Country: Turkey
- Province: Gaziantep
- District: Şehitkamil
- Population (2022): 704
- Time zone: UTC+3 (TRT)

Koçlu is a neighbourhood in the municipality and district of Şehitkamil, Gaziantep Province, Turkey. Its population is 704 (2022). The village is inhabited by Turkmens of the Qiziq tribe.
