= Tokdemir, Şehitkamil =

Village in Gaziantep Province, Turkey

Tokdemir
- Neighbourhood
- Location in Turkey
- Coordinates: 37°11′10″N 37°34′54″E
- Country: Turkey
- Province: Gaziantep
- District: Şehitkamil
- Population (2022): 462
- Time zone: UTC+3 (TRT)

Tokdemir is a neighbourhood in the municipality and district of Şehitkamil, Gaziantep Province, Turkey. Its population is 462 (2022). The village is inhabited by Turkmens of the Qiziq tribe.
