= Gümüşpınar, Araban =

Village in Gaziantep Province, Turkey

Gümüşpınar
- Neighbourhood
- Location in Turkey
- Coordinates: 37°26′40″N 37°53′26″E
- Country: Turkey
- Province: Gaziantep
- District: Araban
- Population (2022): 110
- Time zone: UTC+3 (TRT)

Gümüşpınar is a neighbourhood in the municipality and district of Araban, Gaziantep Province, Turkey. Its population is 110 (2022). The village is inhabited by Alevi Turkmens of the Chepni tribe.
