= Gelinbuğday, Araban =

Village in Gaziantep Province, Turkey

Gelinbuğday
- Neighbourhood
- Location in Turkey
- Coordinates: 37°24′17″N 37°34′49″E
- Country: Turkey
- Province: Gaziantep
- District: Araban
- Population (2022): 241
- Time zone: UTC+3 (TRT)

Gelinbuğday is a neighbourhood in the municipality and district of Araban, Gaziantep Province, Turkey Its population is 241 (2022). The village is inhabited by Turkmens of the Qiziq tribe.
