= Tuğlu, Şehitkamil =

Village in Gaziantep Province, Turkey

Tuğlu
- Neighbourhood
- Location in Turkey
- Coordinates: 37°11′5″N 37°31′50″E
- Country: Turkey
- Province: Gaziantep
- District: Şehitkamil
- Population (2022): 461
- Time zone: UTC+3 (TRT)

Tuğlu is a neighbourhood in the municipality and district of Şehitkamil, Gaziantep Province, Turkey. Its population is 461 (2022). The village is inhabited by Turkmens of the Qiziq tribe.
