= Yenişarkaya, Şehitkamil =

Village in Gaziantep Province, Turkey

Yenişarkaya
- Neighbourhood
- Location in Turkey
- Coordinates: 37°11′43″N 37°8′16″E
- Country: Turkey
- Province: Gaziantep
- District: Şehitkamil
- Population (2022): 384
- Time zone: UTC+3 (TRT)

Yenişarkaya is a neighbourhood in the municipality and district of Şehitkamil, Gaziantep Province, Turkey. Its population is 384 (2022). The village is inhabited by Turkmens of the Jerid tribe and had a population of 384 in 2021.
