= Atalar, Şehitkamil =

Village in Gaziantep Province, Turkey

Atalar
- Neighbourhood
- Location in Turkey
- Coordinates: 37°10′33″N 37°1′15″E
- Country: Turkey
- Province: Gaziantep
- District: Şehitkamil
- Population (2022): 2,620
- Time zone: UTC+3 (TRT)

Atalar, historically and still informally known as Şıhlıcerit, is a neighbourhood in the municipality and district of Şehitkamil, Gaziantep Province, Turkey. Its population is 2,620 (2022). The village is inhabited by Turkmens of the Jerid tribe.
