= Yukarıyeniköy, Yavuzeli =

Village in Gaziantep Province, Turkey

Yukarıyeniköy
- Neighbourhood
- Location in Turkey
- Coordinates: 37°17′47″N 37°41′26″E
- Country: Turkey
- Province: Gaziantep
- District: Yavuzeli
- Population (2022): 338
- Time zone: UTC+3 (TRT)

Yukarıyeniköy is a neighbourhood in the municipality and district of Yavuzeli, Gaziantep Province, Turkey. The village is inhabited by Alevi Turkmens of the Chepni tribe and had a population of 338 in 2022.
