= Muratlı, Araban =

Village in Gaziantep Province, Turkey

Muratlı
- Neighbourhood
- Location in Turkey
- Coordinates: 37°23′48″N 37°32′5″E
- Country: Turkey
- Province: Gaziantep
- District: Araban
- Population (2022): 363
- Time zone: UTC+3 (TRT)

Muratlı, historically Kızık and informally known as Bediren, is a neighbourhood in the municipality and district of Araban, Gaziantep Province, Turkey. Its population is 363 (2022). The village is inhabited by Turkmens of the Qiziq tribe.
