= Sarılar, Şehitkamil =

Village in Gaziantep Province, Turkey

Sarılar
- Neighbourhood
- Location in Turkey
- Coordinates: 37°11′44″N 37°6′46″E
- Country: Turkey
- Province: Gaziantep
- District: Şehitkamil
- Population (2022): 350
- Time zone: UTC+3 (TRT)

Sarılar, formerly and still informally called Kaleobası, is a neighbourhood in the municipality and district of Şehitkamil, Gaziantep Province, Turkey. Its population is 350 (2022). The village is inhabited by Turkmens of the Jerid tribe.
