= Köklüce, Araban =

Village in Gaziantep Province, Turkey

Köklüce
- Neighbourhood
- Location in Turkey
- Coordinates: 37°28′9″N 37°37′8″E
- Country: Turkey
- Province: Gaziantep
- District: Araban
- Population (2022): 1,104
- Time zone: UTC+3 (TRT)

Köklüce, historically Arzıl, is a neighbourhood in the municipality and district of Araban, Gaziantep Province, Turkey. Its population is 1,104 (2022). The village is inhabited by Turkmens of the Qiziq tribe.
