= Karacaburç, Şehitkamil =

Village in Gaziantep Province, Turkey

Karacaburç
- Neighbourhood
- Location in Turkey
- Coordinates: 37°13′31″N 37°20′40″E
- Country: Turkey
- Province: Gaziantep
- District: Şehitkamil
- Population (2022): 1,345
- Time zone: UTC+3 (TRT)

Karacaburç is a neighbourhood in the municipality and district of Şehitkamil, Gaziantep Province, Turkey. Its population is 1,345 (2022). The village is inhabited by Turkmens of the Qiziq tribe.
