= Sarılar, Yavuzeli =

Village in Gaziantep Province, Turkey

Sarılar
- Neighbourhood
- Location in Turkey
- Coordinates: 37°19′10″N 37°49′56″E
- Country: Turkey
- Province: Gaziantep
- District: Yavuzeli
- Population (2022): 638
- Time zone: UTC+3 (TRT)

Sarılar is a neighbourhood in the municipality and district of Yavuzeli, Gaziantep Province, Turkey. The village is inhabited by Alevi Turkmens of the Chepni tribe and had a population of 638 in 2022.
