= Karacaören, Şehitkamil =

Village in Gaziantep Province, Turkey

Karacaören
- Neighbourhood
- Location in Turkey
- Coordinates: 37°12′55″N 37°23′21″E
- Country: Turkey
- Province: Gaziantep
- District: Şehitkamil
- Population (2022): 10,428
- Time zone: UTC+3 (TRT)

Karacaören, also called Kızık Karacaören, is a neighbourhood in the municipality and district of Şehitkamil, Gaziantep Province, Turkey. Its population is 10,428 (2022). The village is inhabited by Turkmens of the Qiziq tribe.
