= Güngürge, Şehitkamil =

Village in Gaziantep Province, Turkey

Güngürge
- Neighbourhood
- Location in Turkey
- Coordinates: 37°12′55″N 37°28′8″E
- Country: Turkey
- Province: Gaziantep
- District: Şehitkamil
- Population (2022): 4,794
- Time zone: UTC+3 (TRT)

Güngürge is a neighbourhood in the municipality and district of Şehitkamil, Gaziantep Province, Turkey. Its population is 4,794 (2022). The village is inhabited by Turkmens of the Qiziq tribe.
