= Tarlabaşı (disambiguation) =

Tarlabaşı is a neighbourhood in the Beyoğlu district of Istanbul Province, Turkey.

Tarlabaşı may also refer to:

- Tarlabaşı, Araban, a neighbourhood in Gaziantep Province, Turkey
- Tarlabaşı, Genç, a village in Bingöl Province, Turkey
- Tarlabaşı, Kızıltepe, a neighbourhood in Mardin Province, Turkey
