= Sarıbuğday, Yavuzeli =

Village in Gaziantep Province, Turkey

Sarıbuğday
- Neighbourhood
- Location in Turkey
- Coordinates: 37°18′15″N 37°30′58″E
- Country: Turkey
- Province: Gaziantep
- District: Yavuzeli
- Population (2022): 324
- Time zone: UTC+3 (TRT)

Sarıbuğday is a neighbourhood in the municipality and district of Yavuzeli, Gaziantep Province, Turkey. The village is inhabited by Turkmens of the Qiziq tribe and had a population of 324 in 2022.
