= Bağbaşı =

Bağbaşı may refer to:

- Bağbaşı, Kahta, a village in Adıyaman Province, Turkey
- Bağbaşı, Şehitkamil, a village in Gaziantep Province, Turkey
- Eğiste, formerly known as Bağbaşı, a village in Konya Province, Turkey
