= Küçükkarakuyu, Yavuzeli =

Village in Gaziantep Province, Turkey

Küçükkarakuyu
- Neighbourhood
- Location in Turkey
- Coordinates: 37°21′2″N 37°32′29″E
- Country: Turkey
- Province: Gaziantep
- District: Yavuzeli
- Population (2022): 198
- Time zone: UTC+3 (TRT)

Küçükkarakuyu (Kurdish: Binamli) is a neighbourhood in the municipality and district of Yavuzeli, Gaziantep Province, Turkey. The village is populated by Kurds and a minority of Turkmens of the Qiziq tribe and had a population of 198 in 2022.
