= Karayusuflu, Şehitkamil =

Village in Gaziantep Province, Turkey

Karayusuflu
- Neighbourhood
- Location in Turkey
- Coordinates: 37°19′24″N 37°27′10″E
- Country: Turkey
- Province: Gaziantep
- District: Şehitkamil
- Population (2022): 156
- Time zone: UTC+3 (TRT)

Karayusuflu is a neighbourhood in the municipality and district of Şehitkamil, Gaziantep Province, Turkey. Its population is 156 (2022). The village is inhabited by Turkmens of the Qiziq tribe.
