= Cerityeniyapan, Şehitkamil =

Village in Gaziantep Province, Turkey

Cerityeniyapan
- Neighbourhood
- Location in Turkey
- Coordinates: 37°10′50″N 37°9′20″E
- Country: Turkey
- Province: Gaziantep
- District: Şehitkamil
- Population (2022): 555
- Time zone: UTC+3 (TRT)

Cerityeniyapan is a neighbourhood in the municipality and district of Şehitkamil, Gaziantep Province, Turkey. Its population is 555 (2022). The village is inhabited by Turkmens of the Jerid tribe.
