= Karacaören, Araban =

Village in Gaziantep Province, Turkey

Karacaören
- Neighbourhood
- Location in Turkey
- Coordinates: 37°28′41″N 37°40′55″E
- Country: Turkey
- Province: Gaziantep
- District: Araban
- Population (2022): 94
- Time zone: UTC+3 (TRT)

Karacaören is a neighbourhood in the municipality and district of Araban, Gaziantep Province, Turkey. Its population is 94 (2022). The village is inhabited by Turkmens of the Qiziq tribe.
