= Süleymanobası, Yavuzeli =

Village in Gaziantep Province, Turkey

Süleymanobası
- Neighbourhood
- Location in Turkey
- Coordinates: 37°15′15″N 37°33′8″E
- Country: Turkey
- Province: Gaziantep
- District: Yavuzeli
- Population (2022): 1,861
- Time zone: UTC+3 (TRT)

Süleymanobası is a neighbourhood in the municipality and district of Yavuzeli, Gaziantep Province, Turkey. The village is populated by Kurds and a minority of Turkmens of the Qiziq tribe and had a population of 1,861 in 2022.
