= Fakılı =

Fakılı may refer to:

- Fakılı, Araban, neighbourhood in Araban, Gaziantep Province, Turkey
- Fakılı, Erdemli, neighbourhood in Erdemli, Mersin Province, Turkey
- İlhan Fakılı (born 2006), Turkish footballer
