= Yayıktaş, Şehitkamil =

Village in Gaziantep Province, Turkey

Yayıktaş
- Neighbourhood
- Location in Turkey
- Coordinates: 37°15′14″N 37°25′29″E
- Country: Turkey
- Province: Gaziantep
- District: Şehitkamil
- Population (2022): 621
- Time zone: UTC+3 (TRT)

Yayıktaş, historically Üçkilise (lit. 'three churches'), is a neighbourhood in the municipality and district of Şehitkamil, Gaziantep Province, Turkey. Its population is 621 (2022). The village is inhabited by Turkmens of the Qiziq tribe.
