= Karpuzkaya, Şehitkamil =

Village in Gaziantep Province, Turkey

Karpuzkaya
- Neighbourhood
- Location in Turkey
- Coordinates: 37°14′28″N 37°13′27″E
- Country: Turkey
- Province: Gaziantep
- District: Şehitkamil
- Population (2022): 416
- Time zone: UTC+3 (TRT)

Karpuzkaya, historically and still informally called Telhüyük, is a neighbourhood in the municipality and district of Şehitkamil, Gaziantep Province, Turkey. Its population is 416 (2022). The village is inhabited by Turkmens of the Qiziq tribe.
