= Altınpınar, Araban =

Village in Gaziantep Province, Turkey

Altınpınar
- Neighbourhood
- Location in Turkey
- Coordinates: 37°24′41″N 37°52′0″E
- Country: Turkey
- Province: Gaziantep
- District: Araban
- Population (2022): 72
- Time zone: UTC+3 (TRT)

Altınpınar, historically and still informally called Kızboğan, is a neighbourhood in the municipality and district of Araban, Gaziantep Province, Turkey. The village is inhabited by Alevi Turkmens of the Chepni tribe and had a population of 72 in 2022.
