= Ballık, Yavuzeli =

Village in Gaziantep Province, Turkey

Ballık
- Neighbourhood
- Location in Turkey
- Coordinates: 37°19′55″N 37°31′58″E
- Country: Turkey
- Province: Gaziantep
- District: Yavuzeli
- Population (2022): 598
- Time zone: UTC+3 (TRT)

Ballık is a neighbourhood in the municipality and district of Yavuzeli, Gaziantep Province, Turkey. The village is inhabited by Turkmens of the Qiziq tribe and had a population of 598 in 2022.
