= Seymenli, Şehitkamil =

Village in Gaziantep Province, Turkey

Seymenli
- Neighbourhood
- Location in Turkey
- Coordinates: 37°18′48″N 37°21′7″E
- Country: Turkey
- Province: Gaziantep
- District: Şehitkamil
- Population (2022): 500
- Time zone: UTC+3 (TRT)

Seymenli, historically and still informally called Dülese, is a neighbourhood in the municipality and district of Şehitkamil, Gaziantep Province, Turkey. Its population is 500 (2022). The village is inhabited by Turkmens of the Qiziq tribe.
