= Yarımca, Yavuzeli =

Village in Gaziantep Province, Turkey

Yarımca
- Neighbourhood
- Location in Turkey
- Coordinates: 37°19′31″N 37°40′5″E
- Country: Turkey
- Province: Gaziantep
- District: Yavuzeli
- Population (2022): 162
- Time zone: UTC+3 (TRT)

Yarımca is a neighbourhood in the municipality and district of Yavuzeli, Gaziantep Province, Turkey. The village is inhabited by Alevi Turkmens of the Chepni tribe and had a population of 162 in 2022.
