= Ilıcak, Yavuzeli =

Village in Gaziantep Province, Turkey

Ilıcak
- Neighbourhood
- Location in Turkey
- Coordinates: 37°20′21″N 37°27′39″E
- Country: Turkey
- Province: Gaziantep
- District: Yavuzeli
- Population (2022): 100
- Time zone: UTC+3 (TRT)

Ilıcak is a neighbourhood in the municipality and district of Yavuzeli, Gaziantep Province, Turkey. The village is inhabited by Turkmens of the Qiziq tribe and had a population of 100 in 2022.
