= Eskişarkaya, Şehitkamil =

Village in Gaziantep Province, Turkey

Eskişarkaya
- Neighbourhood
- Location in Turkey
- Coordinates: 37°13′11″N 37°7′45″E
- Country: Turkey
- Province: Gaziantep
- District: Şehitkamil
- Population (2022): 399
- Time zone: UTC+3 (TRT)

Eskişarkaya is a neighbourhood in the municipality and district of Şehitkamil, Gaziantep Province, Turkey. Its population is 399 (2022). The village is inhabited by Turkmens of the Jerid tribe.
