= Çağkuyu, Şehitkamil =

Village in Gaziantep Province, Turkey

Çağkuyu
- Neighbourhood
- Location in Turkey
- Coordinates: 37°14′45″N 37°27′36″E
- Country: Turkey
- Province: Gaziantep
- District: Şehitkamil
- Population (2022): 758
- Time zone: UTC+3 (TRT)

Çağkuyu is a neighbourhood in the municipality and district of Şehitkamil, Gaziantep Province, Turkey. Its population is 758 (2022). The village is inhabited by Turkmens of the Qiziq tribe.
