= Acaroba, Şehitkamil =

Village in Gaziantep Province, Turkey

Acaroba
- Neighbourhood
- Location in Turkey
- Coordinates: 37°10′27″N 37°7′51″E
- Country: Turkey
- Province: Gaziantep
- District: Şehitkamil
- Population (2022): 234
- Time zone: UTC+3 (TRT)

Acaroba is a neighbourhood in the municipality and district of Şehitkamil, Gaziantep Province, Turkey. Its population is 234 (2022). The village is inhabited by Turkmens of the Jerid tribe.
