= Bağlıca =

Bağlıca is a Turkish place name that may refer to the following places in Turkey:

- Bağlıca, Adıyaman, a village in the District of Adıyaman, Adıyaman Province
- Bağlıca, Amasya, a village in the District of Amasya, Amasya Province
- Bağlıca, Araban, a village in Gaziantep Province
- Bağlıca, Ardanuç, a village in the District of Ardanuç, Artvin Province
- Bağlıca, Artuklu, a village in Mardin Province
- Bağlıca, Çat, in Erzurum Province
- Bağlıca, Emirdağ, a village in the District of Emirdağ, Afyonkarahisar Province
- Bağlıca, Gercüş, a village in the District of Gercüş, Batman Province
- Bağlıca, İliç, a village in Erzincan Province
- Bağlıca, Kurtalan, a village in Siirt Province
- Bağlıca, Kızılcahamam, a village in the District of Kızılcahamam, Ankara Province
- Bağlıca, Nizip or Kubbin, a village in Gaziantep Province
- Bağlıca, Siirt, a village in the Siirt District of Siirt Province
- Bağlıca, Uludere, a village in Şırnak Province
