= İskenderli, Şehitkamil =

Village in Gaziantep Province, Turkey

İskenderli
- Neighbourhood
- Location in Turkey
- Coordinates: 37°11′46″N 37°7′23″E
- Country: Turkey
- Province: Gaziantep
- District: Şehitkamil
- Population (2022): 71
- Time zone: UTC+3 (TRT)

İskenderli is a neighbourhood in the municipality and district of Şehitkamil, Gaziantep Province, Turkey. Its population is 71 (2022). The village is inhabited by Turkmens of the Jerid tribe.
