= Ziyaret, Araban =

Village in Gaziantep Province, Turkey

Ziyaret
- Neighbourhood
- Location in Turkey
- Coordinates: 37°28′35″N 37°42′0″E
- Country: Turkey
- Province: Gaziantep
- District: Araban
- Population (2022): 116
- Time zone: UTC+3 (TRT)

Ziyaret is a neighbourhood in the municipality and district of Araban, Gaziantep Province, Turkey. Its population is 116 (2022). The village is inhabited by Turkmens of the Qiziq tribe.
