= Değirmitaş, Yavuzeli =

Village in Gaziantep Province, Turkey

Değirmitaş
- Neighbourhood
- Location in Turkey
- Coordinates: 37°19′36″N 37°30′28″E
- Country: Turkey
- Province: Gaziantep
- District: Yavuzeli
- Population (2022): 308
- Time zone: UTC+3 (TRT)

Değirmitaş, historically and still informally called Kastel, is a neighbourhood in the municipality and district of Yavuzeli, Gaziantep Province, Turkey. The village is inhabited by Turkmens of the Qiziq tribe and had a population of 308 in 2022.
