= Güllüce, Araban =

Village in Gaziantep Province, Turkey

Güllüce
- Neighbourhood
- Location in Turkey
- Coordinates: 37°27′39″N 37°34′42″E
- Country: Turkey
- Province: Gaziantep
- District: Araban
- Population (2022): 343
- Time zone: UTC+3 (TRT)

Güllüce, formerly and still informally called Telbüzek, is a neighbourhood in the municipality and district of Araban, Gaziantep Province, Turkey. Its population is 343 (2022). The village is inhabited by Turkmens of the Qiziq tribe.
