= Dündarlı, Şehitkamil =

Village in Gaziantep Province, Turkey

Dündarlı
- Neighbourhood
- Location in Turkey
- Coordinates: 37°14′41″N 37°23′28″E
- Country: Turkey
- Province: Gaziantep
- District: Şehitkamil
- Population (2022): 307
- Time zone: UTC+3 (TRT)

Dündarlı is a neighbourhood in the municipality and district of Şehitkamil, Gaziantep Province, Turkey. Its population is 307 (2022). The village is inhabited by Turkmens of the Qiziq tribe, but was formed by Ayrums.
