= Jerid =

Jerid may refer to:

- Djerid, one of the six geographical and economic regions of Tunisia
- Jerid (tribe), a Turkoman tribe from Turkey
- Jereed, a traditional Turkish equestrian team sport
