= Akçagöze, Şehitkamil =

Village in Gaziantep Province, Turkey

Akçagöze
- Neighbourhood
- Location in Turkey
- Coordinates: 37°15′36″N 37°18′8″E
- Country: Turkey
- Province: Gaziantep
- District: Şehitkamil
- Population (2022): 1,408
- Time zone: UTC+3 (TRT)

Akçagöze, historically and still informally called Cıba, is a neighbourhood in the municipality and district of Şehitkamil, Gaziantep Province, Turkey. Its population is 1,408 (2022). The village is inhabited by Turkmens of the Qiziq tribe.
