= Kuzuyatağı, Yavuzeli =

Village in Gaziantep Province, Turkey

Kuzuyatağı
- Neighbourhood
- Location in Turkey
- Coordinates: 37°17′3″N 37°46′29″E
- Country: Turkey
- Province: Gaziantep
- District: Yavuzeli
- Population (2022): 559
- Time zone: UTC+3 (TRT)

Kuzuyatağı, originally and still informally called Miseyri, is a neighbourhood in the municipality and district of Yavuzeli, Gaziantep Province, Turkey. The village is inhabited by Alevi Turkmens of the Chepni tribe and had a population of 559 in 2022.
