= Serintepe, Şehitkamil =

Village in Gaziantep Province, Turkey

Serintepe
- Neighbourhood
- Location in Turkey
- Coordinates: 37°15′30″N 37°12′3″E
- Country: Turkey
- Province: Gaziantep
- District: Şehitkamil
- Population (2022): 547
- Time zone: UTC+3 (TRT)

Serintepe, historically and still informally called Kirlialıcı, is a neighbourhood in the municipality and district of Şehitkamil, Gaziantep Province, Turkey. Its population is 547 (2022). The village is inhabited by Turkmens of the Qiziq tribe.
