= Akbayır, Yavuzeli =

Village in Gaziantep Province, Turkey

Akbayır
- Neighbourhood
- Location in Turkey
- Coordinates: 37°23′2″N 37°33′59″E
- Country: Turkey
- Province: Gaziantep
- District: Yavuzeli
- Population (2022): 212
- Time zone: UTC+3 (TRT)

Akbayır, historically known as Tosbağlı or Tosbağalı, is a neighbourhood in the municipality and district of Yavuzeli, Gaziantep Province, Turkey. The village is inhabited by Turkmens of the Qiziq tribe and had a population of 212 in 2022.
