= Kabasakız, Şehitkamil =

Village in Gaziantep Province, Turkey

Kabasakız
- Neighbourhood
- Location in Turkey
- Coordinates: 37°13′56″N 37°36′33″E
- Country: Turkey
- Province: Gaziantep
- District: Şehitkamil
- Population (2022): 153
- Time zone: UTC+3 (TRT)

Kabasakız is a neighbourhood in the municipality and district of Şehitkamil, Gaziantep Province, Turkey. Its population is 153 (2022).
