= Dımışkılı, Şehitkamil =

Village in Gaziantep Province, Turkey

Dımışkılı
- Neighbourhood
- Location in Turkey
- Coordinates: 37°7′32″N 37°8′58″E
- Country: Turkey
- Province: Gaziantep
- District: Şehitkamil
- Population (2022): 291
- Time zone: UTC+3 (TRT)

Dımışkılı is a neighbourhood in the municipality and district of Şehitkamil, Gaziantep Province, Turkey. Its population is 291 (2022).
