= Tokaçlı, Yavuzeli =

Village in Gaziantep Province, Turkey

Tokaçlı
- Neighbourhood
- Location in Turkey
- Coordinates: 37°15′34″N 37°39′53″E
- Country: Turkey
- Province: Gaziantep
- District: Yavuzeli
- Population (2022): 743
- Time zone: UTC+3 (TRT)

Tokaçlı is a neighbourhood in the municipality and district of Yavuzeli, Gaziantep Province, Turkey. The village had a population of 743 in 2022.
