= Türkyurdu, Şehitkamil =

Village in Gaziantep Province, Turkey

Türkyurdu
- Neighbourhood
- Location in Turkey
- Coordinates: 37°0′17″N 37°38′31″E
- Country: Turkey
- Province: Gaziantep
- District: Şehitkamil
- Population (2022): 69
- Time zone: UTC+3 (TRT)

Türkyurdu, historically Gâvurköy (lit. 'giaour village'), is a neighbourhood in the municipality and district of Şehitkamil, Gaziantep Province, Turkey. Its population is 69 (2022).
