= Örenli, Yavuzeli =

Village in Gaziantep Province, Turkey

Örenli
- Neighbourhood
- Location in Turkey
- Coordinates: 37°15′19″N 37°30′46″E
- Country: Turkey
- Province: Gaziantep
- District: Yavuzeli
- Population (2022): 284
- Time zone: UTC+3 (TRT)

Örenli is a neighbourhood in the municipality and district of Yavuzeli, Gaziantep Province, Turkey. The village had a population of 284 in 2022.
