= Havuz, Yavuzeli =

Village in Gaziantep Province, Turkey

Havuz
- Neighbourhood
- Location in Turkey
- Coordinates: 37°21′6″N 37°43′20″E
- Country: Turkey
- Province: Gaziantep
- District: Yavuzeli
- Population (2022): 229
- Time zone: UTC+3 (TRT)

Havuz is a neighbourhood in the municipality and district of Yavuzeli, Gaziantep Province, Turkey. The village had a population of 229 in 2022.
