= Aşağıyufkalı, Araban =

Village in Gaziantep Province, Turkey

Aşağıyufkalı
- Neighbourhood
- Location in Turkey
- Coordinates: 37°27′6″N 37°45′2″E
- Country: Turkey
- Province: Gaziantep
- District: Araban
- Population (2022): 91
- Time zone: UTC+3 (TRT)

Aşağıyufkalı is a neighbourhood in the municipality and district of Araban, Gaziantep Province, Turkey. The village had a population of 91 in 2022.
