= Saraymağara, Yavuzeli =

Village in Gaziantep Province, Turkey

Saraymağara
- Neighbourhood
- Location in Turkey
- Coordinates: 37°15′35″N 37°36′16″E
- Country: Turkey
- Province: Gaziantep
- District: Yavuzeli
- Population (2022): 490
- Time zone: UTC+3 (TRT)

Saraymağara, historically and still informally called Romanlı, is a neighbourhood in the municipality and district of Yavuzeli, Gaziantep Province, Turkey. The village is inhabited by Kurds of the Reşwan tribe and had a population of 490 in 2022.
