= Günbulur, Şehitkamil =

Village in Gaziantep Province, Turkey

Günbulur
- Neighbourhood
- Location within Turkey
- Coordinates: 37°1′34″N 37°37′45″E
- Country: Turkey
- Province: Gaziantep
- District: Şehitkamil
- Population (2022): 273
- Time zone: UTC+3 (TRT)

Günbulur, historically Keferbostan, is a neighbourhood in the municipality and district of Şehitkamil, Gaziantep Province, Turkey. Its population is 273 (2022). The village is inhabited by non-tribal Turks and Turkmens of the Barak tribe.

== History ==
Previously connected to the Şahinbey district, it was connected to the Şehitkamil district on December 21, 1987. Günbulur was previously a village as an administrative division, but became a neighbourhood after the law change in 2012.
