= Öğümsöğüt, Şehitkamil =

Village in Gaziantep Province, Turkey

Öğümsöğüt
- Neighbourhood
- Location in Turkey
- Coordinates: 37°6′58″N 37°16′43″E
- Country: Turkey
- Province: Gaziantep
- District: Şehitkamil
- Population (2022): 1,641
- Time zone: UTC+3 (TRT)

Öğümsöğüt is a neighbourhood in the municipality and district of Şehitkamil, Gaziantep Province, Turkey. Its population is 1,641 (2022).
