= Keşrobası, Yavuzeli =

Village in Gaziantep Province, Turkey

Keşrobası
- Neighbourhood
- Location in Turkey
- Coordinates: 37°21′14″N 37°34′34″E
- Country: Turkey
- Province: Gaziantep
- District: Yavuzeli
- Population (2022): 226
- Time zone: UTC+3 (TRT)

Keşrobası is a neighbourhood in the municipality and district of Yavuzeli, Gaziantep Province, Turkey. The village had a population of 226 in 2022.
