= Esentepe, Araban =

Village in Gaziantep Province, Turkey

Esentepe
- Neighbourhood
- Location in Turkey
- Coordinates: 37°24′2″N 37°42′42″E
- Country: Turkey
- Province: Gaziantep
- District: Araban
- Population (2022): 793
- Time zone: UTC+3 (TRT)

Esentepe is a neighbourhood in the municipality and district of Araban, Gaziantep Province, Turkey. Its population is 793 (2022).
