= Karahüseyinli, Yavuzeli =

Village in Gaziantep Province, Turkey

Karahüseyinli
- Neighbourhood
- Location in Turkey
- Coordinates: 37°20′9″N 37°36′44″E
- Country: Turkey
- Province: Gaziantep
- District: Yavuzeli
- Population (2022): 143
- Time zone: UTC+3 (TRT)

Karahüseyinli is a neighbourhood in the municipality and district of Yavuzeli, Gaziantep Province, Turkey. The village is populated by Kurds and had a population of 143 in 2022.
