= Güzey, Araban =

Village in Gaziantep Province, Turkey

Güzey
- Neighbourhood
- Location in Turkey
- Coordinates: 37°23′45″N 37°48′24″E
- Country: Turkey
- Province: Gaziantep
- District: Araban
- Population (2022): 310
- Time zone: UTC+3 (TRT)

Güzey is a neighbourhood in the municipality and district of Araban, Gaziantep Province, Turkey. Its population is 310 (2022).
