= Sarıkaya, Araban =

Village in Gaziantep Province, Turkey

Sarıkaya
- Neighbourhood
- Location in Turkey
- Coordinates: 37°31′5″N 37°43′22″E
- Country: Turkey
- Province: Gaziantep
- District: Araban
- Population (2022): 458
- Time zone: UTC+3 (TRT)

Sarıkaya is a neighbourhood in the municipality and district of Araban, Gaziantep Province, Turkey. Its population is 458 (2022).
