= Elif, Araban =

Elif
- Neighbourhood
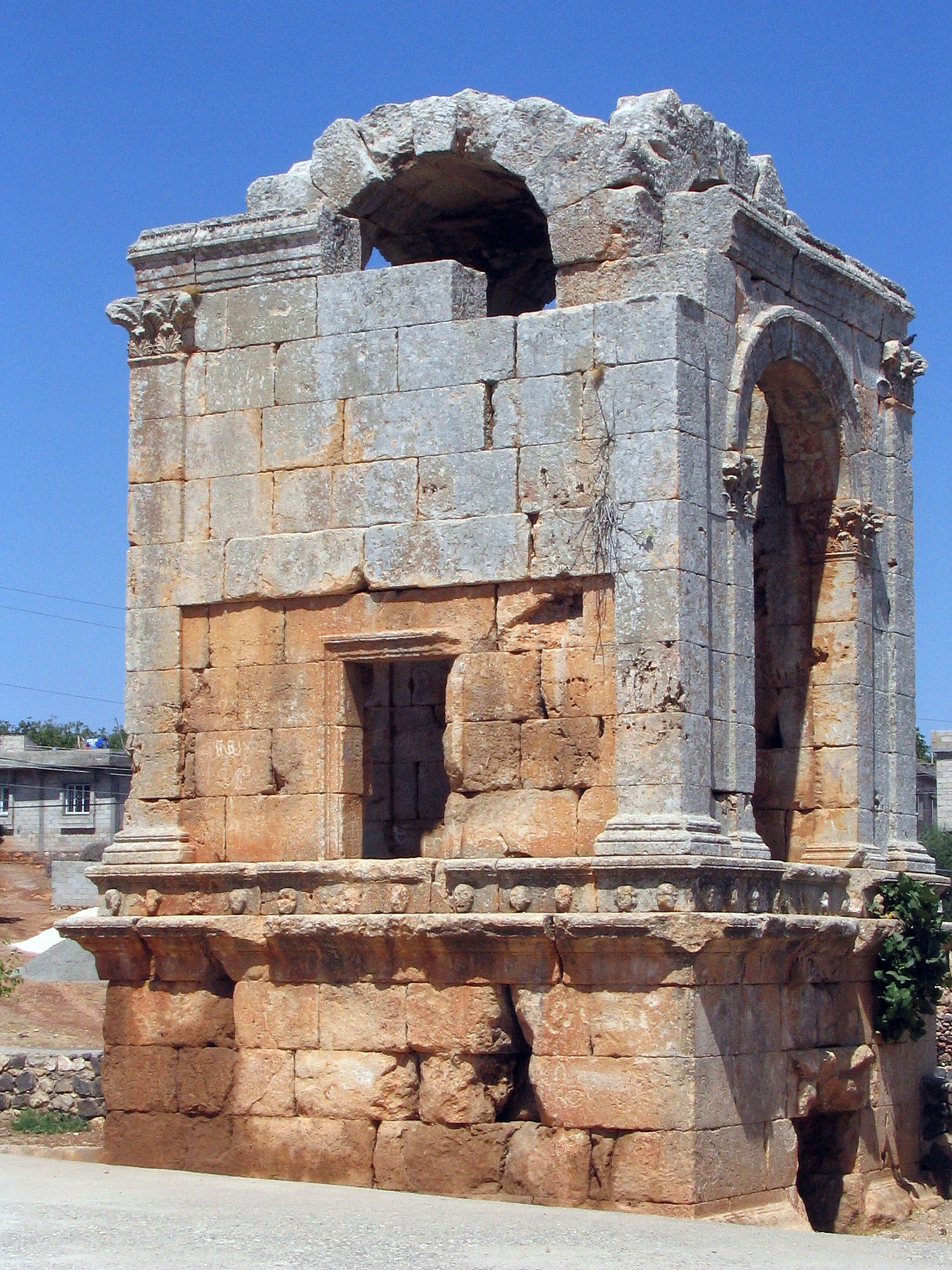
- Roman ruins of Elif

- Location within Turkey
- Coordinates: 37°23′N 37°53′E
- Country: Turkey
- Province: Gaziantep
- District: Araban
- Elevation: 630 m (2,070 ft)
- Population (2022): 3,978
- Time zone: UTC+3 (TRT)
- Postal code: 27650
- Area code: 0342

Elif is a neighbourhood of the municipality and district of Araban, Gaziantep Province, Turkey. Its population is 3,978 (2022). Before the 2013 reorganisation, it was a town (belde). It is 3 kilometres (1.9 mi) from the river Euphrates (Fırat). The distance to Araban is 30 kilometres (19 mi) and to Gaziantep is 70 kilometres (43 mi). In the 2nd or 3rd century the town was a Roman settlement named Sugga. The mausoleum in the town is a Roman building. Elif was declared a seat of township in 1994. Major economic activity is pistachio farming. Some Elif residents work in construction sector.

== See also ==
- Roman mausoleum of Elif
