= Yolveren, Araban =

Village in Gaziantep Province, Turkey

Yolveren
- Neighbourhood
- Location in Turkey
- Coordinates: 37°28′42″N 37°39′23″E
- Country: Turkey
- Province: Gaziantep
- District: Araban
- Population (2022): 281
- Time zone: UTC+3 (TRT)

Yolveren is a neighbourhood in the municipality and district of Araban, Gaziantep Province, Turkey. Its population is 281 (2022).
