= Çiftekoz, Araban =

Village in Gaziantep Province, Turkey

Çiftekoz
- Neighbourhood
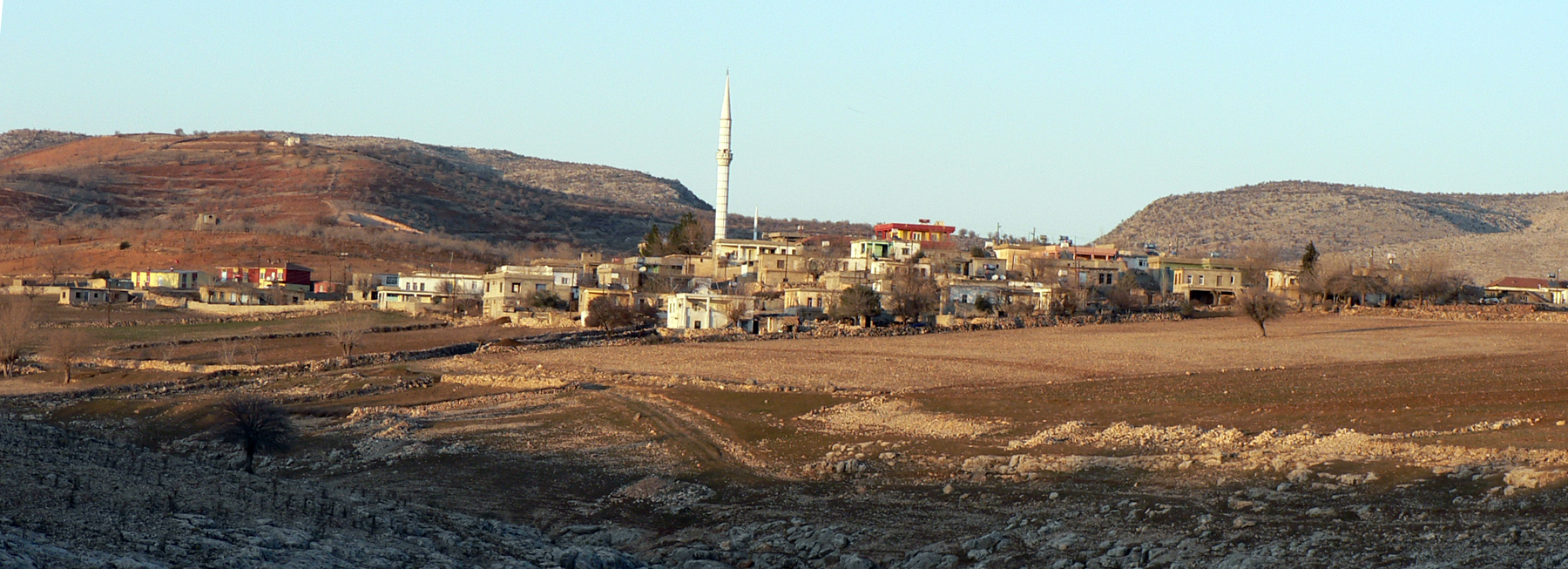
- Silhouette of the village

- Location within Turkey
- Coordinates: 37°26′18″N 37°57′52″E
- Country: Turkey
- Province: Gaziantep
- District: Araban
- Population (2022): 194
- Time zone: UTC+3 (TRT)

Çiftekoz is a neighbourhood in the municipality and district of Araban, Gaziantep Province, Turkey. The village had a population of 194 in 2022.
