= Erenbağ, Araban =

Village in Gaziantep Province, Turkey

Erenbağ
- Neighbourhood
- Location in Turkey
- Coordinates: 37°27′21″N 37°58′7″E
- Country: Turkey
- Province: Gaziantep
- District: Araban
- Population (2022): 85
- Time zone: UTC+3 (TRT)

Erenbağ, formerly and still informally called Şeyhdavut, is a neighbourhood in the municipality and district of Araban, Gaziantep Province, Turkey. Its population is 85 (2022).
