= Sofalıcı, Şehitkamil =

Village in Gaziantep Province, Turkey

Sofalıcı
- Neighbourhood
- Location in Turkey
- Coordinates: 37°7′9″N 37°7′31″E
- Country: Turkey
- Province: Gaziantep
- District: Şehitkamil
- Population (2022): 369
- Time zone: UTC+3 (TRT)

Sofalıcı is a neighbourhood in the municipality and district of Şehitkamil, Gaziantep Province, Turkey. Its population is 369 (2022).
