= Bozobası, Şehitkamil =

Village in Gaziantep Province, Turkey

Bozobası
- Neighbourhood
- Location in Turkey
- Coordinates: 37°13′33″N 37°35′38″E
- Country: Turkey
- Province: Gaziantep
- District: Şehitkamil
- Population (2022): 84
- Time zone: UTC+3 (TRT)

Bozobası is a neighbourhood in the municipality and district of Şehitkamil, Gaziantep Province, Turkey. Its population is 84 (2022).
