= Körhacıobası, Araban =

Village in Gaziantep Province, Turkey

Körhacıobası
- Neighbourhood
- Location in Turkey
- Coordinates: 37°23′52″N 37°37′48″E
- Country: Turkey
- Province: Gaziantep
- District: Araban
- Population (2022): 518
- Time zone: UTC+3 (TRT)

Körhacıobası is a neighbourhood in the municipality and district of Araban, Gaziantep Province, Turkey. Its population is 518 (2022).
