= Yukarıarıl, Şehitkamil =

Village in Gaziantep Province, Turkey

Yukarıarıl
- Neighbourhood
- Location in Turkey
- Coordinates: 37°6′32″N 37°35′58″E
- Country: Turkey
- Province: Gaziantep
- District: Şehitkamil
- Population (2022): 708
- Time zone: UTC+3 (TRT)

Yukarıarıl is a neighbourhood in the municipality and district of Şehitkamil, Gaziantep Province, Turkey. Its population is 708 (2022). The village is inhabited by Turkmens. It was part of the independent municipality Arıl until that was merged into the municipality of Şehitkamil in 2008.
