= Aktoprak, Şehitkamil =

Village in Gaziantep Province, Turkey

Aktoprak
- Neighbourhood
- Location in Turkey
- Coordinates: 37°11′8″N 37°16′51″E
- Country: Turkey
- Province: Gaziantep
- District: Şehitkamil
- Population (2022): 7,695
- Time zone: UTC+3 (TRT)

Aktoprak, historically and still informally called Güccüge, is a neighbourhood in the municipality and district of Şehitkamil, Gaziantep Province, Turkey. Its population is 7,695 (2022). It was an independent municipality until it was merged into the municipality of Şehitkamil in 2008.
