= Şehitkamil =

- District and municipality
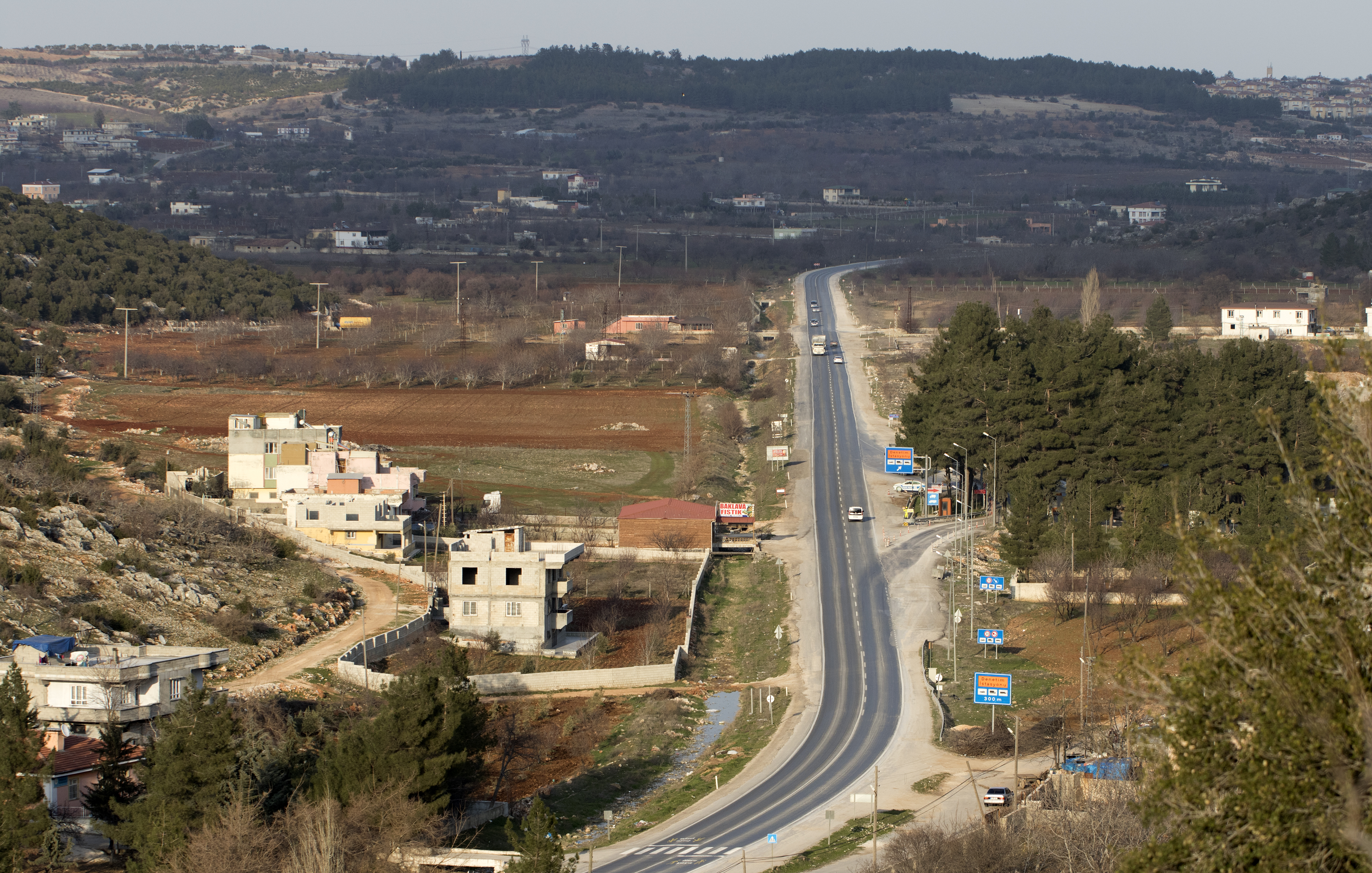
- Yeşilce, Şehitkamil, Gaziantep

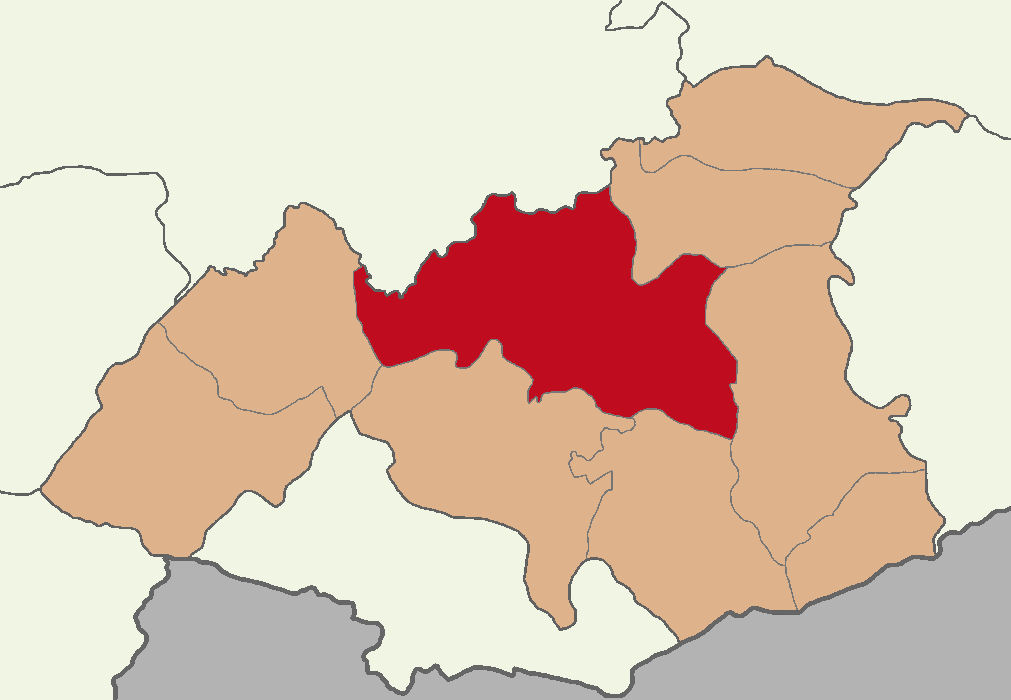
- Map showing Şehitkamil District in Gaziantep Province

- Location within Turkey
- Coordinates: 37°04′29″N 37°23′51″E
- Country: Turkey
- Province: Gaziantep

Government
  - Mayor: Umut Yılmaz (AKP)
- Area: 1,290 km^{2} (500 sq mi)
- Population (2022): 857,167
  - Density: 664/km^{2} (1,720/sq mi)
- Time zone: UTC+3 (TRT)
- Area code: 0342
- Website: www.sehitkamil.bel.tr

Şehitkamil is a municipality and district of Gaziantep Province, Turkey. Its area is 1,290 km^{2}, and its population is 857,167 (2022). It covers the northern part of the agglomeration of Gaziantep and the adjacent countryside. It contains the old city, including Gaziantep Castle, as well as the University of Gaziantep.

On 20 August 2012, a bomb attack occurred, killing at least eight and wounding 64 people.

Şehitkamil was the epicenter of the M_{w} 7.8 2023 Turkey–Syria earthquake, which heavily damaged the district, including its landmarks.

== Composition ==
There are 123 neighbourhoods in Şehitkamil District:

- 15 Temmuz
- 29 Ekim
- 8 Şubat
- Acaroba
- Ağaçlıboyno
- Akçaburç
- Akçagöze
- Aktoprak
- Alparslan
- Aşağıarıl
- Atabek
- Atalar
- Atatürk
- Bağbaşı
- Batıkent
- Battal
- Bayatlı
- Bedirköy
- Belkıs
- Beykent
- Beylerbeyi
- Beyreli
- Bilek
- Boyno
- Bozobası
- Budak
- Burak
- Büyükpınar
- Çağkuyu
- Çamlıtepe
- Cerityeniyapan
- Çıksorut
- Değirmiçem
- Dımışkılı
- Dülük
- Dündarlı
- Durnalık
- Erikli
- Eskişarkaya
- Eydibaba
- Eyüpsultan
- Fevzipaşa
- Fıstıklık
- Gazikent
- Gaziler
- Göksüncük
- Göktürk
- Göllüce
- Günbulur
- Güngürge
- Güvenevler
- Hacıbaba
- İbrahimli
- İbrahimşehir
- İncesu
- Işıklı
- İskenderli
- Kabasakız
- Karacaahmet
- Karacaburç
- Karacaoğlan
- Karacaören
- Karadede
- Karahüyük
- Karakesek
- Karayusuflu
- Karpuzkaya
- Karşıyaka
- Kayaönü
- Kızıkhamurkesen
- Kızık Karasakal
- Koçlu
- Köksalan
- Kozluyazı
- Küllü
- Medegöz
- Merveşehir
- Mevlana
- Mücahitler
- Nesimi
- Öğümsöğüt
- Onat Kutlar
- Osmangazi
- Övündük
- Pancarlı
- Pirsultan
- Sacır
- Safaşehir
- Sam
- Sanayi
- Sancaktepe
- Sarıgüllük
- Sarılar
- Selahattin Eyyübi
- Selimiye
- Serintepe
- Seymenli
- Seyrantepe
- Sinan
- Şirinevler
- Sofalıcı
- Suboğaz
- Sülüklü
- Taşlıca
- Tekirsin
- Tokdemir
- Tuğlu
- Türkyurdu
- Üçgöze
- Uğruca
- Ülkerli
- Ulus
- Umut
- Yalankoz
- Yamaçoba
- Yaprak
- Yayıktaş
- Yenişarkaya
- Yeşilce
- Yeşilova
- Yığınlı
- Yukarıarıl
- Zülfikar

== See also ==
- Gazikentspor, women's football team promoted to the Turkish Women's First Football League for the 2014–15 season.
