= Büyükpınar, Şehitkamil =

Village in Gaziantep Province, Turkey

Büyükpınar
- Neighbourhood
- Location in Turkey
- Coordinates: 37°8′18″N 37°17′14″E
- Country: Turkey
- Province: Gaziantep
- District: Şehitkamil
- Population (2022): 2,477
- Time zone: UTC+3 (TRT)

Büyükpınar is a neighbourhood in the municipality and district of Şehitkamil, Gaziantep Province, Turkey. Its population is 2,477 (2022).
