= Düzce, Yavuzeli =

Village in Gaziantep Province, Turkey

Düzce
- Neighbourhood
- Location in Turkey
- Coordinates: 37°15′51″N 37°43′19″E
- Country: Turkey
- Province: Gaziantep
- District: Yavuzeli
- Population (2022): 212
- Time zone: UTC+3 (TRT)

Düzce is a neighbourhood in the municipality and district of Yavuzeli, Gaziantep Province, Turkey. The village had a population of 212 in 2022.
