= Bilek, Şehitkamil =

Village in Gaziantep Province, Turkey

Bilek
- Neighbourhood
- Location in Turkey
- Coordinates: 37°7′50″N 37°32′32″E
- Country: Turkey
- Province: Gaziantep
- District: Şehitkamil
- Population (2022): 2,905
- Time zone: UTC+3 (TRT)

Bilek is a neighbourhood in the municipality and district of Şehitkamil, Gaziantep Province, Turkey. Its population is 2,905 (2022).
