= Sarıtepe, Araban =

Village in Gaziantep Province, Turkey

Sarıtepe
- Neighbourhood
- Location in Turkey
- Coordinates: 37°23′35″N 37°50′12″E
- Country: Turkey
- Province: Gaziantep
- District: Araban
- Population (2022): 589
- Time zone: UTC+3 (TRT)

Sarıtepe is a neighbourhood in the municipality and district of Araban, Gaziantep Province, Turkey. Its population is 589 (2022).
