= Köksalan, Şehitkamil =

Village in Gaziantep Province, Turkey

Köksalan
- Neighbourhood
- Location in Turkey
- Coordinates: 37°16′39″N 37°14′19″E
- Country: Turkey
- Province: Gaziantep
- District: Şehitkamil
- Population (2022): 1,119
- Time zone: UTC+3 (TRT)

Köksalan, historically and still informally called Mertmenge, is a neighbourhood in the municipality and district of Şehitkamil, Gaziantep Province, Turkey Its population is 1,119 (2022). The village is inhabited by Turkmens of the Elbegli tribe.
