= Emirhaydar, Araban =

Village in Gaziantep Province, Turkey

Emirhaydar
- Neighbourhood
- Location in Turkey
- Coordinates: 37°30′50″N 37°41′46″E
- Country: Turkey
- Province: Gaziantep
- District: Araban
- Population (2022): 286
- Time zone: UTC+3 (TRT)

Emirhaydar is a neighbourhood in the municipality and district of Araban, Gaziantep Province, Turkey. Its population is 286 (2022).
