= Fıstıklıdağ, Araban =

Village in Gaziantep Province, Turkey

Fıstıklıdağ
- Neighbourhood
- Location in Turkey
- Coordinates: 37°27′29″N 38°2′17″E
- Country: Turkey
- Province: Gaziantep
- District: Araban
- Population (2022): 554
- Time zone: UTC+3 (TRT)

Fıstıklıdağ, formerly and still informally called Zekteriş, is a neighbourhood in the municipality and district of Araban, Gaziantep Province, Turkey. Its population is 554 (2022).
