= Gülpınar, Yavuzeli =

Village in Gaziantep Province, Turkey

Gülpınar
- Neighbourhood
- Location in Turkey
- Coordinates: 37°19′18″N 37°43′41″E
- Country: Turkey
- Province: Gaziantep
- District: Yavuzeli
- Population (2022): 291
- Time zone: UTC+3 (TRT)

Gülpınar is a neighbourhood in the municipality and district of Yavuzeli, Gaziantep Province, Turkey. The village had a population of 291 in 2022.
