= Hacımallı, Yavuzeli =

Village in Gaziantep Province, Turkey

Hacımallı
- Neighbourhood
- Location in Turkey
- Coordinates: 37°16′57″N 37°38′11″E
- Country: Turkey
- Province: Gaziantep
- District: Yavuzeli
- Population (2022): 438
- Time zone: UTC+3 (TRT)

Hacımallı is a neighbourhood in the municipality and district of Yavuzeli, Gaziantep Province, Turkey. The village had a population of 438 in 2022.
