= Ahmet Eyüp Türkaslan =

Turkish footballer (1994–2023)

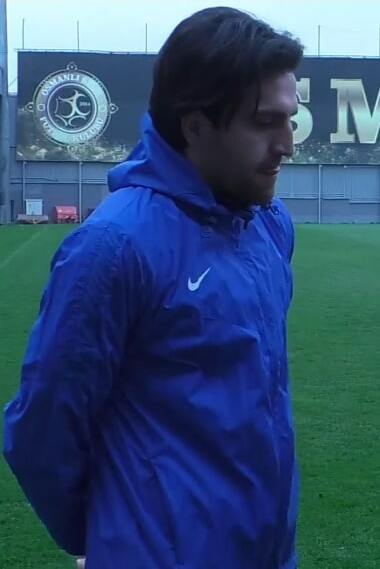
- Türkaslan in 2020

Personal information
- Full name: Ahmet Eyüp Türkaslan
- Date of birth: 11 September 1994
- Place of birth: Yavuzeli, Turkey
- Date of death: 7 February 2023 (aged 28)
- Place of death: Malatya, Turkey
- Height: 1.89 m (6 ft 2 in)
- Position: Goalkeeper

Youth career
- 2007–2011: Gaziantepspor

Senior career*
Years	Team	Apps	(Gls)
2011–2013	Gaziantepspor	0	(0)
2013–2017	Bugsaşspor	40	(0)
2016–2017	→ Osmanlıspor (loan)	1	(0)
2017–2020	Osmanlıspor	28	(0)
2020–2021	Ümraniyespor	16	(0)
2021–2023	Yeni Malatyaspor	2	(0)
Total		87	(0)
- * Club domestic league appearances and goals

Ahmet Eyüp Türkaslan (11 September 1994 – 7 February 2023) was a Turkish professional footballer who played as a goalkeeper.

== Career ==
Türkaslan began his senior career with Bugsaşspor in 2013, and had a short loan at Osmanlıspor in 2016–17. He made his professional debut for Osmanlıspor in a 4–0 loss to Beşiktaş on 3 June 2017. He formally signed with Osmanlıspor, staying there for the next three seasons before moving to Ümraniyespor in 2020.

The following season, he signed a one-year contract with Yeni Malatyaspor.

== Personal life and death ==
Türkaslan was married.

On 6 February 2023, Türkaslan was reported to be trapped under a collapsed residential building after the 2023 Turkey–Syria earthquake. Claims that he had died were denied by the president of the club, Hacı Ahmet Yaman, who said that rescue operations were still ongoing. His wife was rescued from the rubble and asked for help on social media. She added that there were no excavators or cranes at the location. His body was recovered on 7 February 2023. He was 28 at the time of his death.

== Honours ==
Gaziantepspor

- Spor Toto Cup: 2012
