= Büyükkarakuyu, Yavuzeli =

Village in Gaziantep Province, Turkey

Büyükkarakuyu
- Neighbourhood
- Location in Turkey
- Coordinates: 37°14′20″N 37°31′51″E
- Country: Turkey
- Province: Gaziantep
- District: Yavuzeli
- Population (2022): 3,744
- Time zone: UTC+3 (TRT)

Büyükkarakuyu is a neighbourhood in the municipality and district of Yavuzeli, Gaziantep Province, Turkey. The village had a population of 3,744 in 2022.
