= Sinan, Şehitkamil =

Village in Gaziantep Province, Turkey

Sinan
- Neighbourhood
- Location in Turkey
- Coordinates: 37°1′47″N 37°34′31″E
- Country: Turkey
- Province: Gaziantep
- District: Şehitkamil
- Population (2022): 975
- Time zone: UTC+3 (TRT)

Sinan is a neighbourhood in the municipality and district of Şehitkamil, Gaziantep Province, Turkey. Its population was 975 in (2022).
