= Eskialtıntaş, Araban =

Village in Gaziantep Province, Turkey

Eskialtıntaş
- Neighbourhood
- Location in Turkey
- Coordinates: 37°24′9″N 37°41′23″E
- Country: Turkey
- Province: Gaziantep
- District: Araban
- Population (2022): 217
- Time zone: UTC+3 (TRT)

Eskialtıntaş is a neighbourhood in the municipality and district of Araban, Gaziantep Province, Turkey. Its population was 217 in 2022.
