= Karabey, Yavuzeli =

Village in Gaziantep Province, Turkey

Karabey
- Neighbourhood
- Location in Turkey
- Coordinates: 37°16′40″N 37°34′19″E
- Country: Turkey
- Province: Gaziantep
- District: Yavuzeli
- Population (2022): 281
- Time zone: UTC+3 (TRT)

Karabey (Kurdish: Safkan) is a neighbourhood in the municipality and district of Yavuzeli, Gaziantep Province, Turkey. The village is populated by Kurds and had a population of 281 in 2022.
