= Yaylacık, Araban =

Village in Gaziantep Province, Turkey

Yaylacık
- Neighbourhood
- Location in Turkey
- Coordinates: 37°29′47″N 37°44′56″E
- Country: Turkey
- Province: Gaziantep
- District: Araban
- Population (2022): 353
- Time zone: UTC+3 (TRT)

Yaylacık is a neighbourhood in the municipality and district of Araban, Gaziantep Province, Turkey. Its population is 353 (2022). The village is populated by Kurds and had a population of 385 in 2021.
