= Hasanoğlu, Araban =

Village in Gaziantep Province, Turkey

Hasanoğlu
- Neighbourhood
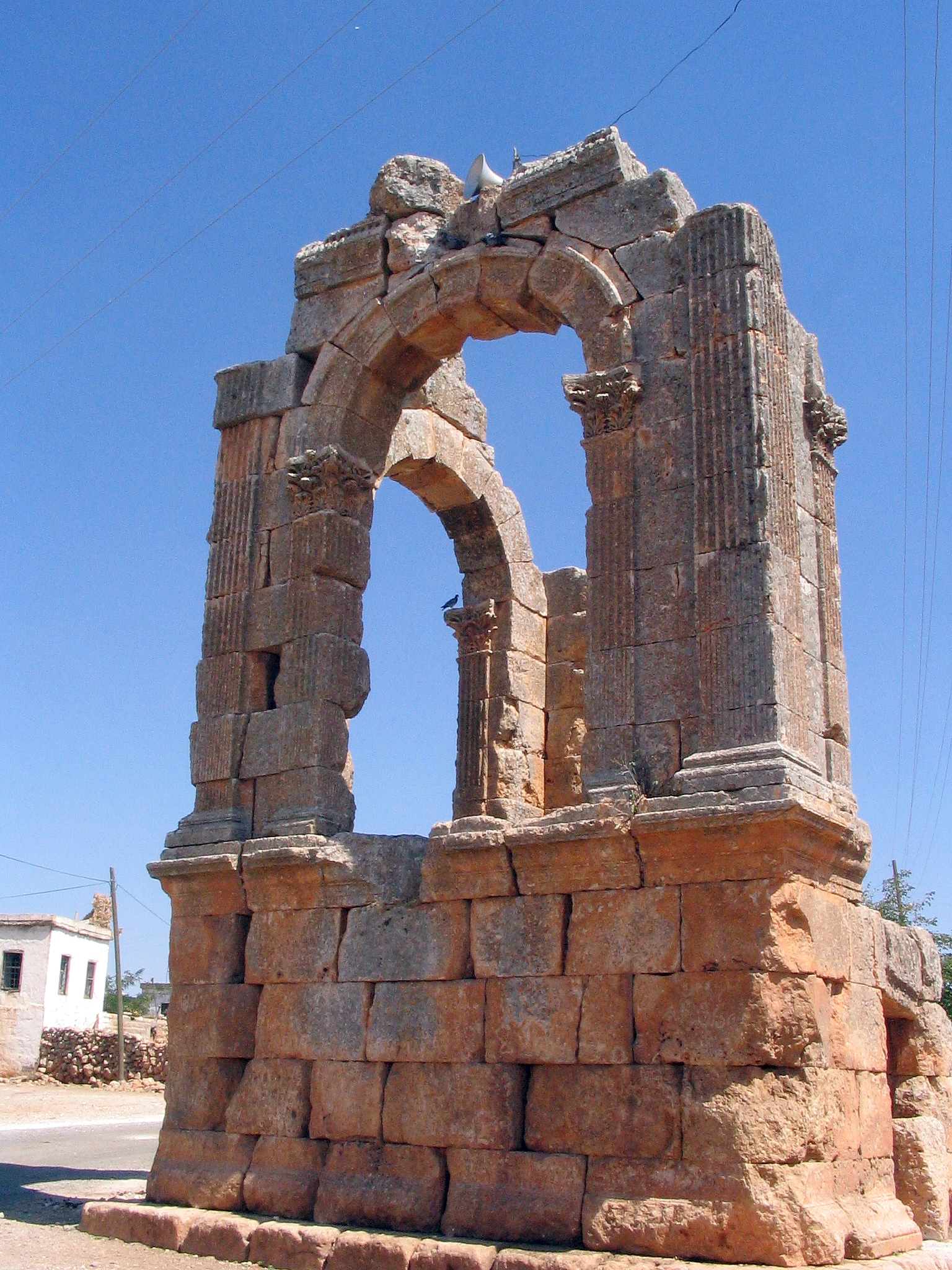
- Roman ruins in the village

- Location within Turkey
- Coordinates: 37°23′6″N 37°51′13″E
- Country: Turkey
- Province: Gaziantep
- District: Araban
- Population (2022): 176
- Time zone: UTC+3 (TRT)

Hasanoğlu is a neighbourhood in the municipality and district of Araban, Gaziantep Province, Turkey. Its population is 176 (2022). The village is inhabited by Alevi Turks of the Chepni tribe.
