= Aşağıkekliktepe, Yavuzeli =

Village in Gaziantep Province, Turkey

Aşağıkekliktepe
- Neighbourhood
- Location in Turkey
- Coordinates: 37.3049°N 37.6251°E
- Country: Turkey
- Province: Gaziantep
- District: Yavuzeli
- Population (2022): 147
- Time zone: UTC+3 (TRT)

Aşağıkekliktepe is a neighbourhood in the municipality and district of Yavuzeli, Gaziantep Province, Turkey. The village had a population of 147 in 2022.
