= Karadede, Şehitkamil =

Village in Gaziantep Province, Turkey

Karadede
- Neighbourhood
- Location in Turkey
- Coordinates: 37°7′31″N 37°9′48″E
- Country: Turkey
- Province: Gaziantep
- District: Şehitkamil
- Population (2022): 631
- Time zone: UTC+3 (TRT)

Karadede is a neighbourhood in the municipality and district of Şehitkamil, Gaziantep Province, Turkey. Its population is 631 (2022).
