= Kasaba, Yavuzeli =

Village in Gaziantep Province, Turkey

Kasaba
- Neighbourhood
- Location in Turkey
- Coordinates: 37°16′44″N 37°50′13″E
- Country: Turkey
- Province: Gaziantep
- District: Yavuzeli
- Population (2022): 329
- Time zone: UTC+3 (TRT)

Kasaba is a neighbourhood in the municipality and district of Yavuzeli, Gaziantep Province, Turkey. The village had a population of 329 in 2022.
