= Başpınar, Araban =

Village in Gaziantep Province, Turkey

Başpınar
- Neighbourhood
- Location in Turkey
- Coordinates: 37°27′3″N 37°51′49″E
- Country: Turkey
- Province: Gaziantep
- District: Araban
- Population (2022): 270
- Time zone: UTC+3 (TRT)

Başpınar is a neighbourhood in the municipality and district of Araban, Gaziantep Province, Turkey. The village is populated by Kurds and had a population of 270 in 2022.
