= Akkoç, Araban =

Village in Gaziantep Province, Turkey

Akkoç
- Neighbourhood
- Location in Turkey
- Coordinates: 37°28′29″N 37°48′0″E
- Country: Turkey
- Province: Gaziantep
- District: Araban
- Population (2022): 100
- Time zone: UTC+3 (TRT)

Akkoç is a neighbourhood in the municipality and district of Araban, Gaziantep Province, Turkey. The village had a population of 100 in 2022.
