= Bağtepe, Yavuzeli =

Village in Gaziantep Province, Turkey

Bağtepe
- Neighbourhood
- Location in Turkey
- Coordinates: 37°19′54″N 37°38′33″E
- Country: Turkey
- Province: Gaziantep
- District: Yavuzeli
- Population (2022): 208
- Time zone: UTC+3 (TRT)

Bağtepe, historically and still informally called Mandollu, is a neighbourhood in the municipality and district of Yavuzeli, Gaziantep Province, Turkey. The village is populated by Kurds and had a population of 208 in 2022.
