= 2012 Gaziantep bombing =

Terrorist incident in Turkey

- Part of the Kurdish–Turkish conflict
- 2012 Gaziantep bombing (Turkey) 37.078132,37.378578
- Location: 37.078132°N 37.378578°E; Şehitkamil, Gaziantep Province, Turkey
- Date: 20 August 2012
- Attack type: Terror attack
- Weapon: Remote-controlled car bombs
- Deaths: 10
- Injuries: 64-69
- Perpetrator: Unclear

The 2012 Gaziantep bombing was a terrorist bomb attack which occurred in the city of Gaziantep, Turkey on 20 August 2012, the second day of the three-day celebrations of "Şeker Bayramı" (Eid-ul-Fitr) that refers to the end of the Islamic holy month of Ramadan.

== Attack ==
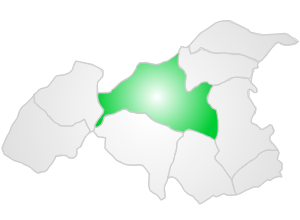
Location of Şehitkamil in Gaziantep

The bomb blast occurred at 19:45 in local time. Bombs were planted in a truck and remotely detonated near Karşıyaka police station in Şehitkamil district, one of the most crowded areas of the city. The police station was the target of the attack.

As a result of the explosion, two public buses caught fire, increasing the casualties. Many other cars parked on the street and shops were also badly damaged by the blast.

== Casualties ==
The attack killed eight people. The next day, a 12-year-old girl died of her wounds. Four of the dead were children. The number of wounded people have been reported by Hürriyet to be 66, some of whom were policemen. Deputy Prime Minister Beşir Atalay later said the wounded numbered 69 people. 17 of the injured people were hospitalized, four of whom were in critical condition.

== Perpetrators ==
Although there was no claim of responsibility, the bombs were believed by Turkish officials to be planted by PKK. However, on 21 August 2012, Fırat News announced that PKK had denied responsibility for the attack and claimed that another Kurdish group, the TAK was responsible for the attack. On 21 August, four people were detained in Şanlıurfa and brought to Gaziantep for questioning.

Turkey also investigated whether any countries, such as Iran, were involved in the attack as well.

== Reactions ==
=== Turkey ===
- Turkey — Turkish President Abdullah Gül expressed his sorrow over the deaths in the attack and strongly condemned those who perpetrated the terrorist attack. Gul also said, "I send my condolences to all our citizens. I condemn people who carried on this felonious attack which killed innocent people including children. Children who died in their prime shows everybody that terror is a crime against humanity. I wish that the whole world will see the real face of these attackers and see that these people are not near the humanitarian values at all."

=== International ===
- European Union — The European Union condemned the attack as a terrorist attack, expressing its deep regrets for the attack, and that "the terrorist threat worries us."
- UK — The UK Foreign and Commonwealth Office condemned the attack as a terrorist attack, and expressed its condolences to the families of those killed during the attack, as well as a speedy recovery to the injured. Foreign Office Minister Alistair Burt tweeted, "I was saddened to hear of the latest terrorist outrage in Gaziantep."
- Iran — Hossein Nakavi, spokesperson for the Iranian parliament's National Security and Foreign Policy Commission, implied that Turkey risked becoming a target of attacks like the Gaziantep bombing by intervening in Syria, and that Turkey should focus on "its own internal affairs instead of intervening in Syria." Nakavi accused Turkey of supporting terrorist groups in Syria, including al-Qaeda, and said that this support is "leading to the deaths of innocent people" and also "jeopardizing Turkey's own safety."
- Italy — Italian President Giorgio Napolitano sent a message of condolence to Turkish President Abdullah Gul regarding the attack, which he described as cowardly.
- Spain — Spains' Ministry of Foreign Affairs and Co-operation condemned the attack as a cowardly terrorist attack. Spain also expressed its condolences to the Turkish government, the Turkish people, and the families and friends of the victims.
- United States — The United States condemned the attack as a terrorist attack, and said that the United States "stands with Turkey in its fight against terrorism." The United States also conveyed its condolences to the families and loved ones of the victims.
- Turkic Council — Members of the Turkic Council condemned the attack as a terrorist attack, expressing their sympathy and support in the fight against terrorism.
