= Yukarıkaravaiz, Araban =

Village in Gaziantep Province, Turkey

Yukarıkaravaiz
- Neighbourhood
- Location in Turkey
- Coordinates: 37°27′38″N 37°48′35″E
- Country: Turkey
- Province: Gaziantep
- District: Araban
- Population (2022): 1,532
- Time zone: UTC+3 (TRT)

Yukarıkaravaiz is a neighbourhood in the municipality and district of Araban, Gaziantep Province, Turkey. Its population is 1,532 (2022).
