= Aşağıkaravaiz, Araban =

Village in Gaziantep Province, Turkey

Aşağıkaravaiz
- Neighbourhood
- Location in Turkey
- Coordinates: 37°26′29″N 37°47′50″E
- Country: Turkey
- Province: Gaziantep
- District: Araban
- Population (2022): 405
- Time zone: UTC+3 (TRT)

Aşağıkaravaiz is a neighbourhood in the municipality and district of Araban, Gaziantep Province, Turkey. The village had a population of 405 in 2022.
