= Karahan, Yavuzeli =

Village in Gaziantep Province, Turkey

Karahan
- Neighbourhood
- Location in Turkey
- Coordinates: 37°21′21″N 37°40′49″E
- Country: Turkey
- Province: Gaziantep
- District: Yavuzeli
- Population (2022): 122
- Time zone: UTC+3 (TRT)

Karahan, historically Nohutalan, is a neighbourhood in the municipality and district of Yavuzeli, Gaziantep Province, Turkey. The village is inhabited by Turkmens and had a population of 122 in 2022.
