= Çimenli, Yavuzeli =

Village in Gaziantep Province, Turkey

Çimenli
- Neighbourhood
- Location in Turkey
- Coordinates: 37°17′2″N 37°35′2″E
- Country: Turkey
- Province: Gaziantep
- District: Yavuzeli
- Population (2022): 97
- Time zone: UTC+3 (TRT)

Çimenli is a neighbourhood in the municipality and district of Yavuzeli, Gaziantep Province, Turkey. The village had a population of 97 in 2022.
