= Doğan, Araban =

Village in Gaziantep Province, Turkey

Doğan
- Neighbourhood
- Location in Turkey
- Coordinates: 37°24′12″N 37°47′4″E
- Country: Turkey
- Province: Gaziantep
- District: Araban
- Population (2022): 186
- Time zone: UTC+3 (TRT)

Doğan is a neighbourhood in the municipality and district of Araban, Gaziantep Province, Turkey. Its population is 186 (2022).
