= Beydili, Araban =

Village in Gaziantep Province, Turkey

Beydili
- Neighbourhood
- Location in Turkey
- Coordinates: 37°30′26″N 37°40′0″E
- Country: Turkey
- Province: Gaziantep
- District: Araban
- Population (2022): 610
- Time zone: UTC+3 (TRT)

Beydili is a neighbourhood in the municipality and district of Araban, Gaziantep Province, Turkey. The village is inhabited by Turkmens and had a population of 610 in 2022.
