= Yeşilce, Şehitkamil =

Village in Gaziantep Province, Turkey

Yeşilce
- Neighbourhood
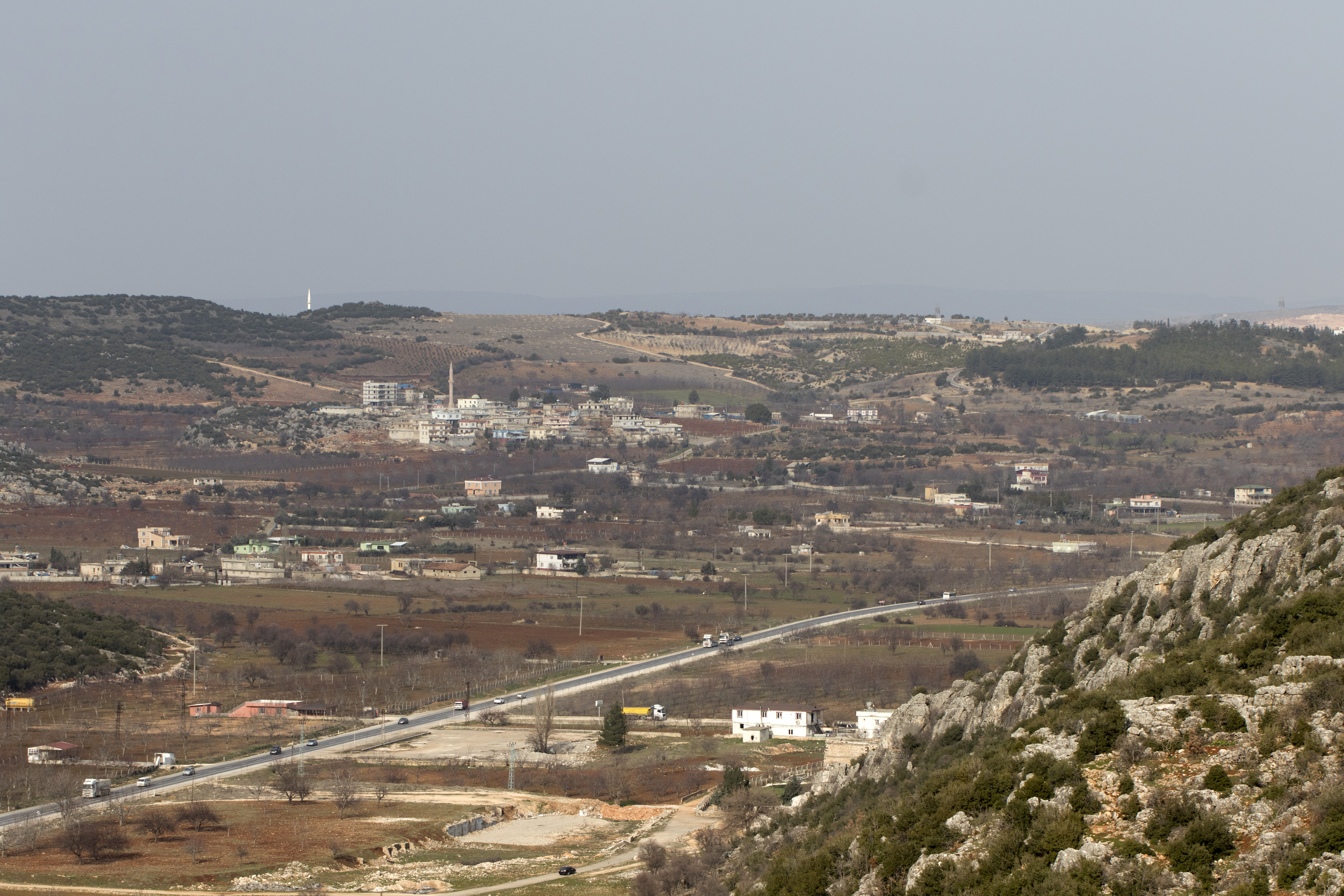
- Overlook of the village

- Location within Turkey
- Coordinates: 37°10′13″N 37°12′33″E
- Country: Turkey
- Province: Gaziantep
- District: Şehitkamil
- Population (2022): 520
- Time zone: UTC+3 (TRT)

Yeşilce, historically and still informally called Böög Araptar, is a neighbourhood in the municipality and district of Şehitkamil, Gaziantep Province, Turkey. Its population is 520 (2022). The village is inhabited by Turkmens.
