= Gökçepayam, Araban =

Village in Gaziantep Province, Turkey

Gökçepayam
- Neighbourhood
- Location in Turkey
- Coordinates: 37°29′5″N 37°46′4″E
- Country: Turkey
- Province: Gaziantep
- District: Araban
- Population (2022): 368
- Time zone: UTC+3 (TRT)

Gökçepayam is a neighbourhood in the municipality and district of Araban, Gaziantep Province, Turkey. Its population is 368 (2022).
