= Ağaçlıboyno, Şehitkamil =

Village in Gaziantep Province, Turkey

Ağaçlıboyno
- Neighbourhood
- Location in Turkey
- Coordinates: 37°11′11″N 37°14′21″E
- Country: Turkey
- Province: Gaziantep
- District: Şehitkamil
- Population (2022): 275
- Time zone: UTC+3 (TRT)

Ağaçlıboyno is a neighbourhood in the municipality and district of Şehitkamil, Gaziantep Province, Turkey. Its population is 275 (2022). The village is inhabited by Turkmens.
