= İbrahimşehir, Şehitkamil =

Village in Gaziantep Province, Turkey

İbrahimşehir
- Neighbourhood
- Location in Turkey
- Coordinates: 37°4′6″N 37°38′0″E
- Country: Turkey
- Province: Gaziantep
- District: Şehitkamil
- Population (2022): 281
- Time zone: UTC+3 (TRT)

İbrahimşehir is a neighbourhood in the municipality and district of Şehitkamil, Gaziantep Province, Turkey. Its population is 281 (2022).
