= Karababa, Araban =

Village in Gaziantep Province, Turkey

Karababa
- Neighbourhood
- Location in Turkey
- Coordinates: 37°25′24″N 37°50′43″E
- Country: Turkey
- Province: Gaziantep
- District: Araban
- Population (2022): 114
- Time zone: UTC+3 (TRT)

Karababa is a neighbourhood in the municipality and district of Araban, Gaziantep Province, Turkey. Its population is 114 (2022). The village is populated by Kurds.
