= Üçgöl, Yavuzeli =

Village in Gaziantep Province, Turkey

Üçgöl
- Neighbourhood
- Location in Turkey
- Coordinates: 37°14′45″N 37°41′17″E
- Country: Turkey
- Province: Gaziantep
- District: Yavuzeli
- Population (2022): 584
- Time zone: UTC+3 (TRT)

Üçgöl is a neighbourhood in the municipality and district of Yavuzeli, Gaziantep Province, Turkey. The village had a population of 584 in 2022.
