= Beyreli, Şehitkamil =

Village in Gaziantep Province, Turkey

Beyreli
- Neighbourhood
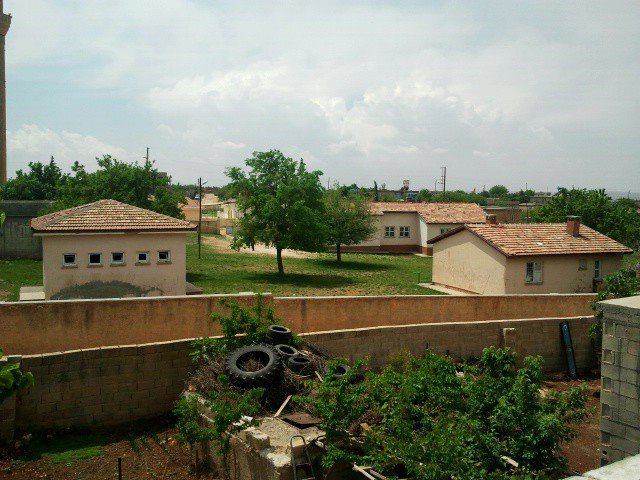

- Location within Turkey
- Coordinates: 37°13′2″N 37°34′47″E
- Country: Turkey
- Province: Gaziantep
- District: Şehitkamil
- Population (2022): 197
- Time zone: UTC+3 (TRT)

Beyreli is a neighbourhood in the municipality and district of Şehitkamil, Gaziantep Province, Turkey. Its population is 197 (2022).

== History ==
The former name of the village was Romanlı.
