= Ülkerli, Şehitkamil =

Village in Gaziantep Province, Turkey

Ülkerli
- Neighbourhood
- Location in Turkey
- Coordinates: 37°13′15″N 37°14′23″E
- Country: Turkey
- Province: Gaziantep
- District: Şehitkamil
- Population (2022): 421
- Time zone: UTC+3 (TRT)

Ülkerli, also known as Yukarı Araptar, is a neighbourhood in the municipality and district of Şehitkamil, Gaziantep Province, Turkey. Its population was 421 in 2022. The village is inhabited by Turkmens.
