= Taşdeğirmen, Araban =

Village in Gaziantep Province, Turkey

Taşdeğirmen
- Neighbourhood
- Location in Turkey
- Coordinates: 37°25′14″N 37°48′20″E
- Country: Turkey
- Province: Gaziantep
- District: Araban
- Population (2022): 865
- Time zone: UTC+3 (TRT)

Taşdeğirmen is a neighbourhood in the municipality and district of Araban, Gaziantep Province, Turkey. Its population is 865 (2022).
