= Yukarıyufkalı, Araban =

Village in Gaziantep Province, Turkey

Yukarıyufkalı
- Neighbourhood
- Location in Turkey
- Coordinates: 37.4702°N 37.7509°E
- Country: Turkey
- Province: Gaziantep
- District: Araban
- Population (2022): 95
- Time zone: UTC+3 (TRT)

Yukarıyufkalı is a neighbourhood in the municipality and district of Araban, Gaziantep Province, Turkey. Its population is 95 (2022).
