= Akbudak, Araban =

Village in Gaziantep Province, Turkey

Akbudak
- Neighbourhood
- Location in Turkey
- Coordinates: 37°26′39″N 37°56′14″E
- Country: Turkey
- Province: Gaziantep
- District: Araban
- Population (2022): 923
- Time zone: UTC+3 (TRT)

Akbudak, formerly and still informally called Süpürgüç (Armenian: Սուրբ Փրկիչ, romanized: Surb P’rkich’, lit. 'holy saviour'), is a neighbourhood in the municipality and district of Araban, Gaziantep Province, Turkey. It had a population of 923 in 2022. The village was formerly inhabited by Armenians until the Armenian genocide, after which Kurds settled in the village.
