= Battal, Şehitkamil =

Village in Gaziantep Province, Turkey

Battal
- Neighbourhood
- Location in Turkey
- Coordinates: 37°6′12″N 37°39′4″E
- Country: Turkey
- Province: Gaziantep
- District: Şehitkamil
- Population (2022): 532
- Time zone: UTC+3 (TRT)

Battal is a neighbourhood in the municipality and district of Şehitkamil, Gaziantep Province, Turkey. Its population is 532 (2022). The village is populated by Turkmens of the Barak tribe.
