= Yukarıkekliktepe, Yavuzeli =

Village in Gaziantep Province, Turkey

Yukarıkekliktepe
- Neighbourhood
- Location in Turkey
- Coordinates: 37°17′56″N 37°37′22″E
- Country: Turkey
- Province: Gaziantep
- District: Yavuzeli
- Population (2022): 265
- Time zone: UTC+3 (TRT)

Yukarıkekliktepe is a neighbourhood in the municipality and district of Yavuzeli, Gaziantep Province, Turkey. The village had a population of 265 in 2022.
