= Küçüklü, Araban =

Village in Gaziantep Province, Turkey

Küçüklü
- Neighbourhood
- Location in Turkey
- Coordinates: 37°25′49″N 37°49′24″E
- Country: Turkey
- Province: Gaziantep
- District: Araban
- Population (2022): 413
- Time zone: UTC+3 (TRT)

Küçüklü is a neighbourhood in the municipality and district of Araban, Gaziantep Province, Turkey. Its population is 413 (2022).
