= Durnalık, Şehitkamil =

Village in Gaziantep Province, Turkey

Durnalık
- Neighbourhood
- Location in Turkey
- Coordinates: 37°9′55″N 37°11′28″E
- Country: Turkey
- Province: Gaziantep
- District: Şehitkamil
- Population (2022): 167
- Time zone: UTC+3 (TRT)

Durnalık is a neighbourhood in the municipality and district of Şehitkamil, Gaziantep Province, Turkey. Its population is 167 (2022).
