= Hisar, Araban =

Village in Gaziantep Province, Turkey

Hisar
- Neighbourhood
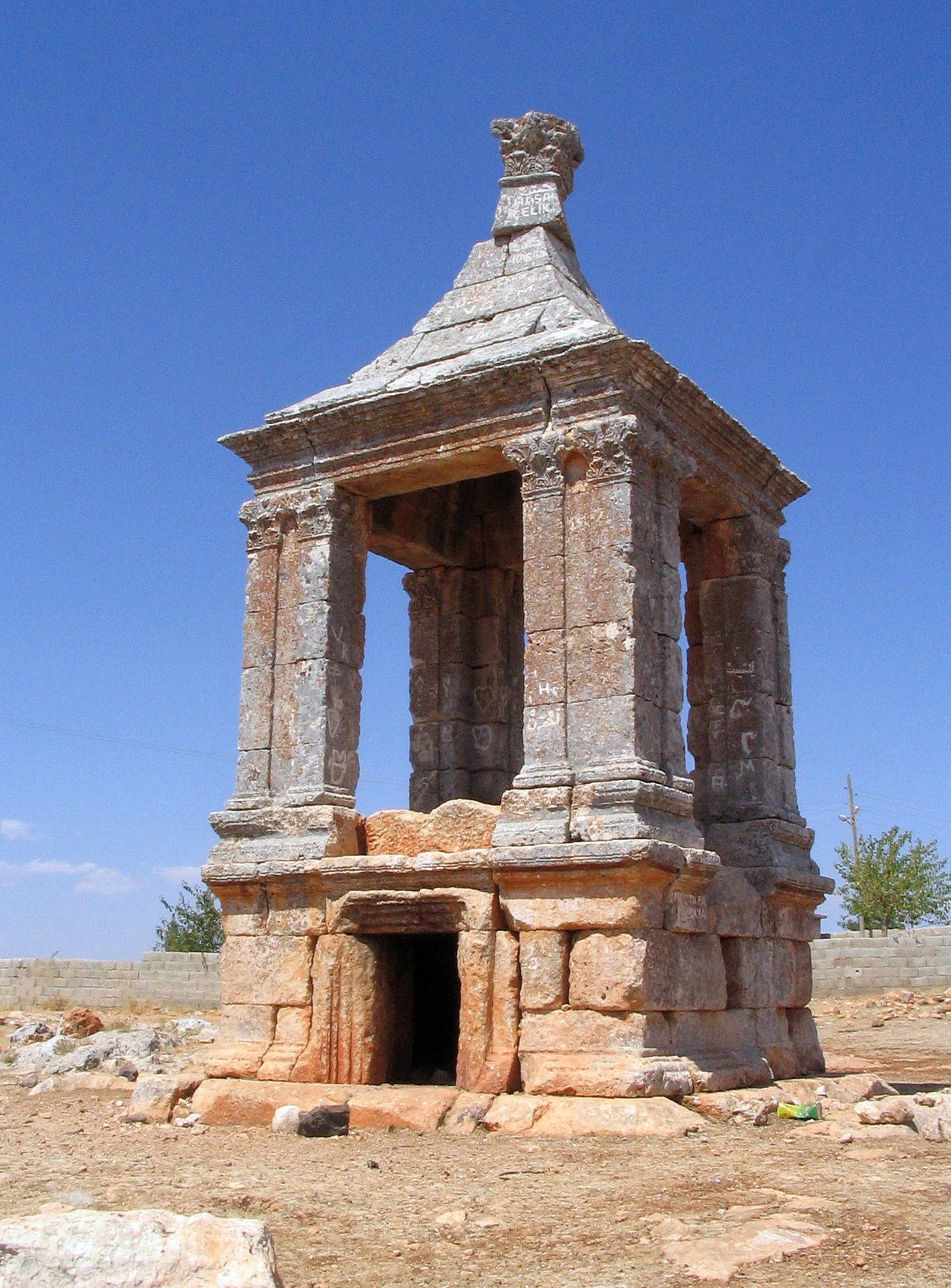
- Romain ruins of Hisar

- Location within Turkey
- Coordinates: 37°23′12″N 37°55′1″E
- Country: Turkey
- Province: Gaziantep
- District: Araban
- Population (2022): 1,000
- Time zone: UTC+3 (TRT)

Hisar is a neighbourhood in the municipality and district of Araban, Gaziantep Province, Turkey. Its population is 1,000 (2022).
