= Fakılı, Araban =

Village in Gaziantep Province, Turkey

Fakılı
- Neighbourhood
- Location in Turkey
- Coordinates: 37°24′22″N 37°44′40″E
- Country: Turkey
- Province: Gaziantep
- District: Araban
- Population (2022): 1,212
- Time zone: UTC+3 (TRT)

Fakılı is a neighbourhood in the municipality and district of Araban, Gaziantep Province, Turkey. Its population is 1,212 (2022).
