= Araban =

- District and municipality
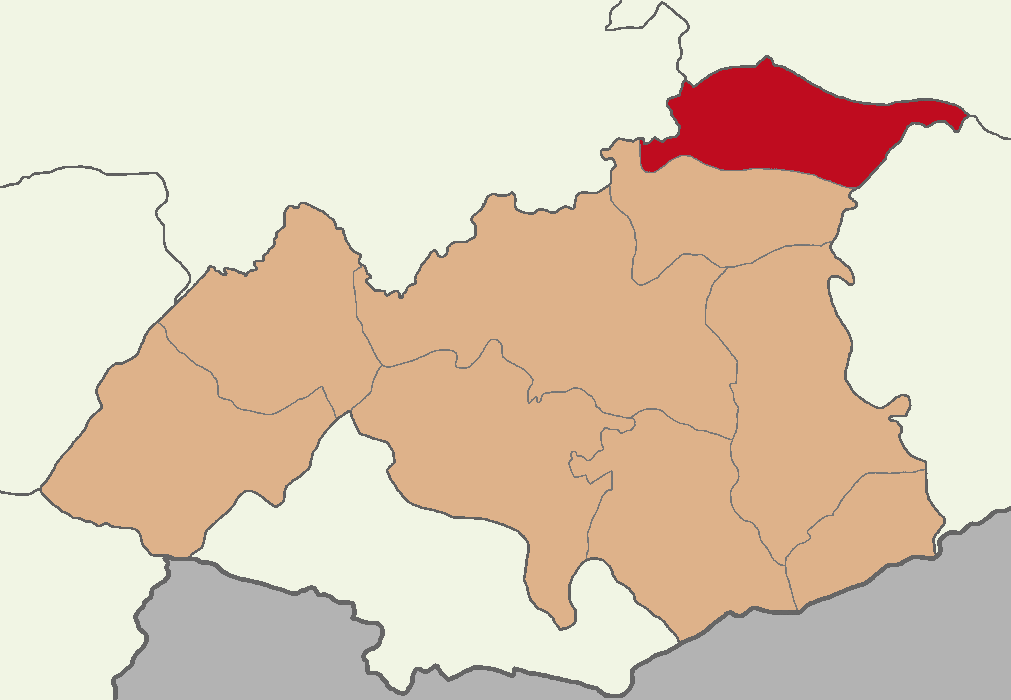
- Map showing Araban District in Gaziantep Province

- Location in Turkey
- Coordinates: 37°25′29″N 37°41′34″E
- Country: Turkey
- Province: Gaziantep

Government
  - Mayor: Mehmet Özdemir (Ind.)
- Area: 592 km^{2} (229 sq mi)
- Elevation: 610 m (2,000 ft)
- Population (2022): 32,933
  - Density: 55.6/km^{2} (144/sq mi)
- Time zone: UTC+3 (TRT)
- Postal code: 27650
- Area code: 0342
- Website: www.araban.bel.tr

Araban (Kurdish: Qale) is a municipality and district of Gaziantep Province, Turkey. Its area is 592 km^{2}, and its population is 32,933 (2022). The district was established in 1957.

== History ==
The city was historically known as Raban. In October/November 958, the Byzantine Empire led by John Tzimiskes and Basil Lekapenos managed to defeat Sayf al-Dawla of the Hamdanids at the Battle of Raban.

Raban was ruled by the Armenian ruler Kogh Vasil, following the First Crusade in 1097. It was captured by Mesud I in April 1150, before it was burned by the Mongols in the 13th century. In 1268, King Hethum I had to surrendered several fortresses including Raban to Baibars, who had imprisoned Hethum's son, Leo, following the Battle of Mari.

== Composition ==
There are 49 neighbourhoods in Araban District:

- Akbudak
- Akkoç
- Altınpınar
- Aşağıkaravaiz
- Aşağıyufkalı
- Bağlıca
- Başpınar
- Beydili
- Çiftekoz
- Dağdancık
- Doğan
- Dumlupınar
- Elif
- Emirhaydar
- Erenbağ
- Esentepe
- Eskialtıntaş
- Fakılı
- Fevziçakmak
- Fıstıklıdağ
- Gelinbuğday
- Gökçepayam
- Güllüce
- Gümüşpınar
- Güzey
- Hasanoğlu
- Hisar
- Kale
- Karababa
- Karacaören
- Köklüce
- Körhacıobası
- Küçüklü
- Mehmet Gökçek
- Muratlı
- Nurettin
- Sarıkaya
- Sarıtepe
- Şerif Peri
- Tarlabaşı
- Taşdeğirmen
- Turgut Özal
- Yaylacık
- Yeni Altıntaş
- Yeşilova
- Yolveren
- Yukarıkaravaiz
- Yukarıyufkalı
- Ziyaret

== See also ==
- Roman mausoleums of Araban

== Sources ==
- Raphael, Kate (2010). Muslim Fortresses in the Levant: Between Crusaders and Mongols. Routledge. ISBN 9781136925269.
