= Bağlıca, Araban =

Village in Gaziantep Province, Turkey

Bağlıca
- Neighbourhood
- Location in Turkey
- Coordinates: 37°28′23″N 37°43′40″E
- Country: Turkey
- Province: Gaziantep
- District: Araban
- Population (2022): 85
- Time zone: UTC+3 (TRT)

Bağlıca is a neighbourhood in the municipality and district of Araban, Gaziantep Province, Turkey. The village had a population of 85 in 2022.
