= Yavuzeli =

- District and municipality
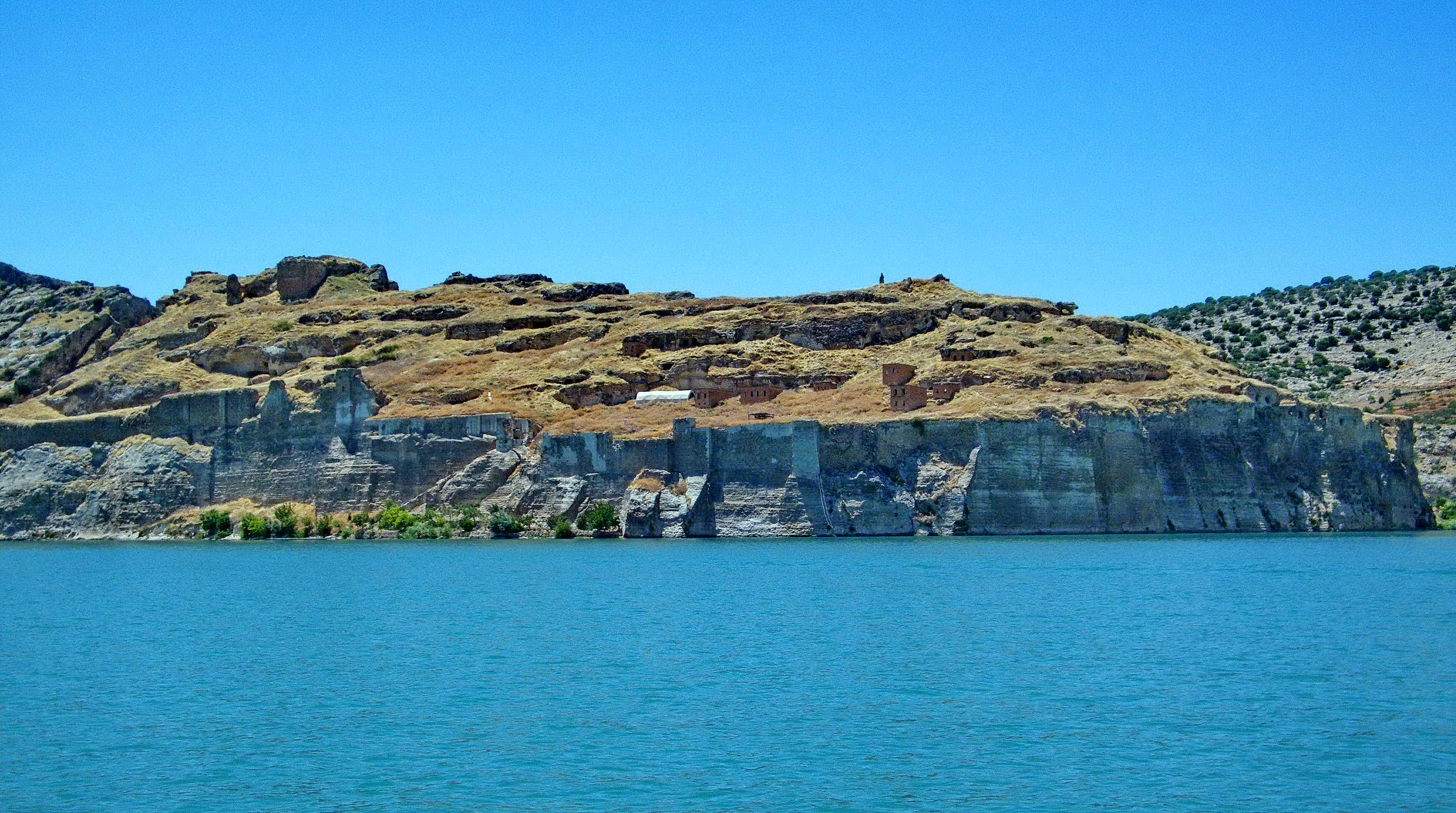
- Rumkale, Yavuzeli

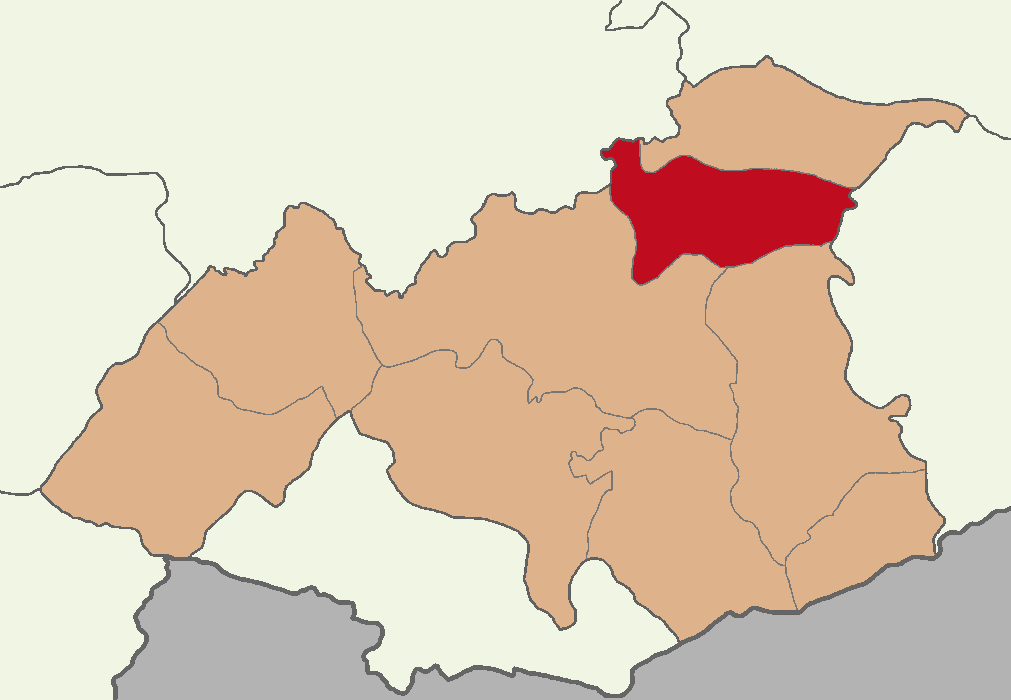
- Map showing Yavuzeli District in Gaziantep Province

- Location within Turkey
- Coordinates: 37°19′09″N 37°34′07″E
- Country: Turkey
- Province: Gaziantep

Government
  - Mayor: Mehmet Kaya (YRP)
- Area: 468 km^{2} (181 sq mi)
- Population (2022): 22,762
  - Density: 48.6/km^{2} (126/sq mi)
- Time zone: UTC+3 (TRT)
- Postal code: 27970
- Area code: 0342
- Website: www.yavuzeli.bel.tr

Yavuzeli is a municipality and district of Gaziantep Province, Turkey. Its area is 468 km^{2}, and its population is 22,762 (2022).

== Composition ==
There are 44 neighbourhoods in Yavuzeli District:

- Akbayır
- Aşağıhöçüklü
- Aşağıkayabaşı
- Aşağıkekliktepe
- Bağtepe
- Bakırca
- Ballık
- Beğendik
- Bülbül
- Büyükkarakuyu
- Çiltoprak
- Çimenli
- Cingife
- Cumhuriyet
- Değirmitaş
- Düzce
- Fevzi Çakmak
- Göçmez
- Gülpınar
- Hacımallı
- Havuz
- Hürriyet
- Ilıcak
- Karabey
- Karahan
- Karahüseyinli
- Kasaba
- Keşrobası
- Küçükkarakuyu
- Kuzuyatağı
- Örenli
- Saraymağara
- Sarıbuğday
- Sarılar
- Şenlikçe
- Süleymanobası
- Sultan Selim
- Tokaçlı
- Üçgöl
- Yarımca
- Yeniyurt
- Yöreli
- Yukarıkekliktepe
- Yukarıyeniköy

== Notable people ==
- Ahmet Eyüp Türkaslan, Turkish footballer (1994−2023).
