= Işıklı, Şehitkamil =

Village in Gaziantep Province, Turkey

Işıklı
- Neighbourhood
- Location in Turkey
- Coordinates: 37°8′42″N 37°11′35″E
- Country: Turkey
- Province: Gaziantep
- District: Şehitkamil
- Population (2022): 2,760
- Time zone: UTC+3 (TRT)

Işıklı is a neighbourhood in the municipality and district of Şehitkamil, Gaziantep Province, Turkey. Its population is 2,760 (2022).
