= Nuri Mehmed Pasha =

Ottoman governor of Aintab from 1784 to 1790

Battalzade Nuri Mehmed Pasha (1760 – 1790) was the Ottoman mutasarrif (governor) of Aintab from 1784 until his death. Nuri Mehmed was born to Battalzade Mehmed Agha in 1760. His grandfather Hajji Mehmed Agha, dubbed as Qojabattal, was the former mutesellim of Aintab and Kilis. Nuri Mehmed completed his education when he was 20 years old, and in 1781, he became mirliva, and in 1784, he was appointed as mirimiran and mutasarrif of Aintab. He wrote several poems with his pen name Nuri. According to several written and oral sources, he composed a Divan.

== Bibliography ==
- Yakar, Halil İbrahim (11 September 2013). "NÛRÎ, Mehmed Paşa". Türk Edebiyatı Eserler Sözlüğü. Ahmet Yesevi University. ISBN 978-9944-237-86-4.
