= Tarlabaşı, Araban =

Village in Gaziantep Province, Turkey

Tarlabaşı
- Neighbourhood
- Location in Turkey
- Coordinates: 37°25′1″N 37°57′6″E
- Country: Turkey
- Province: Gaziantep
- District: Araban
- Population (2022): 79
- Time zone: UTC+3 (TRT)

Tarlabaşı is a neighbourhood in the municipality and district of Araban, Gaziantep Province, Turkey. Its population is 79 (2022).
