= Chepni of Rumkale =

Rumkale Çepnileri

Regions with significant populations
- Turkey: Nizip, Yavuzeli, Araban

Languages
- Turkish

Religion
- Alevism

Related ethnic groups
- Turkish people

Chepni of Rumkale (Turkish: Rumkale Çepnileri) is a distinct branch of the Chepni tribe inhabiting the northeastern portion of the province of Gaziantep in south-central Turkey, formerly the Ottoman kaza of Rumkale.

== History ==
Chepni was already present in the region of Rumkale by the early 16th century, but it is unknown when the tribe migrated to the region. In the late 17th century, the Chepni living around Rumkale were known to be settled and would ransack the localities of Pazarcık and Keferdiz, a practice inherited from their nomadic past. Some tribesmen later built the Chepni or Kazımiye Tekke in Aintab.

== Chepni Tekke of Aintab ==
Although formed by Chepni, the Chepni Tekke in Gaziantep gradually became the center of all Alevi Turkmens living near Aintab. On certain days of the year, people from the vicinity of Besni, Marash, Sakçagözü, Islahiye, and Barak villages would travel to the city for traditional celebrations. Visitors then would kiss the hand of the Chepni Dede, who would arrive the same day, bring presents, and take part in recreational activities. The visitors then would take home some of the water from the tekke's well, since it is considered as holy as the Zamzam Well in Mecca.

== Religion ==
All Chepni in the region traditionally follow the Alevi branch of Islam, and due to their belief, they were particularly distinguished from the nearby Sunni Kurd population, who would traditionally see any kind of interaction with Alevis as a sin. Chepni of Rumkale namely belong to Dede Garkın and Musa Kâzım Ocaks.
