= Jerid (tribe) =

Turkoman tribe

Cerit

Regions with significant populations
- Turkey: Gaziantep, Kahramanmaraş, Ankara, Çankırı, Balıkesir, Aydın; Iran: Dargaz

Languages
- Turkish

Religion
- Sunni Islam, Alevism

Related ethnic groups
- Turkish people, Azerbaijanis, Khorasani Turks

Jerid (Turkish: Cerit) is a Turkoman tribe inhabiting the provinces of Gaziantep, Kahramanmaraş, Ankara, Çankırı, Balıkesir, and Aydın in Turkey.

== Etymology ==
The etymological origin of the name of the tribe is disputed. In some parts of Turkey, jerid means skilled, vivacious, and fast, and it is believed that either the Jerid tribe was associated with these attributes or the term was derived from the tribe instead. It is also proposed that the tribe's name comes from jereed, a traditional sport played with javelins. Likewise, 19th-century traveler William Francis Ainsworth translated the tribe's name as the "short-lance."

== History ==
Jerid appeared first with the Beylik of Dulkadir in the 14th century, inhabiting the region of Marash and Elbistan. In the 16th century, portions of the tribe spread to the vicinity of Niğde, Kayseri, and Sivas from Marash Sanjak. In late 17th and early 18th centuries, several sub-tribes of Jerid were exiled to Raqqa and Balikh, which portions of the tribe inhabiting the eyalet of Dulkadir later joined in 1713. The tribe was also resettled in Cyprus during the same time period. Johann Ludwig Burckhardt encountered the Jerid tribe between Payas and Adana in the early 19th century. William Francis Ainsworth came across Jerid Turkomans near Keskin in central Anatolia. Traveller Henry C. Barkley encountered the tribe near Aintab in late 19th century.
