= Qiziq people =

Oghuz Turkic tribe

Qiziq
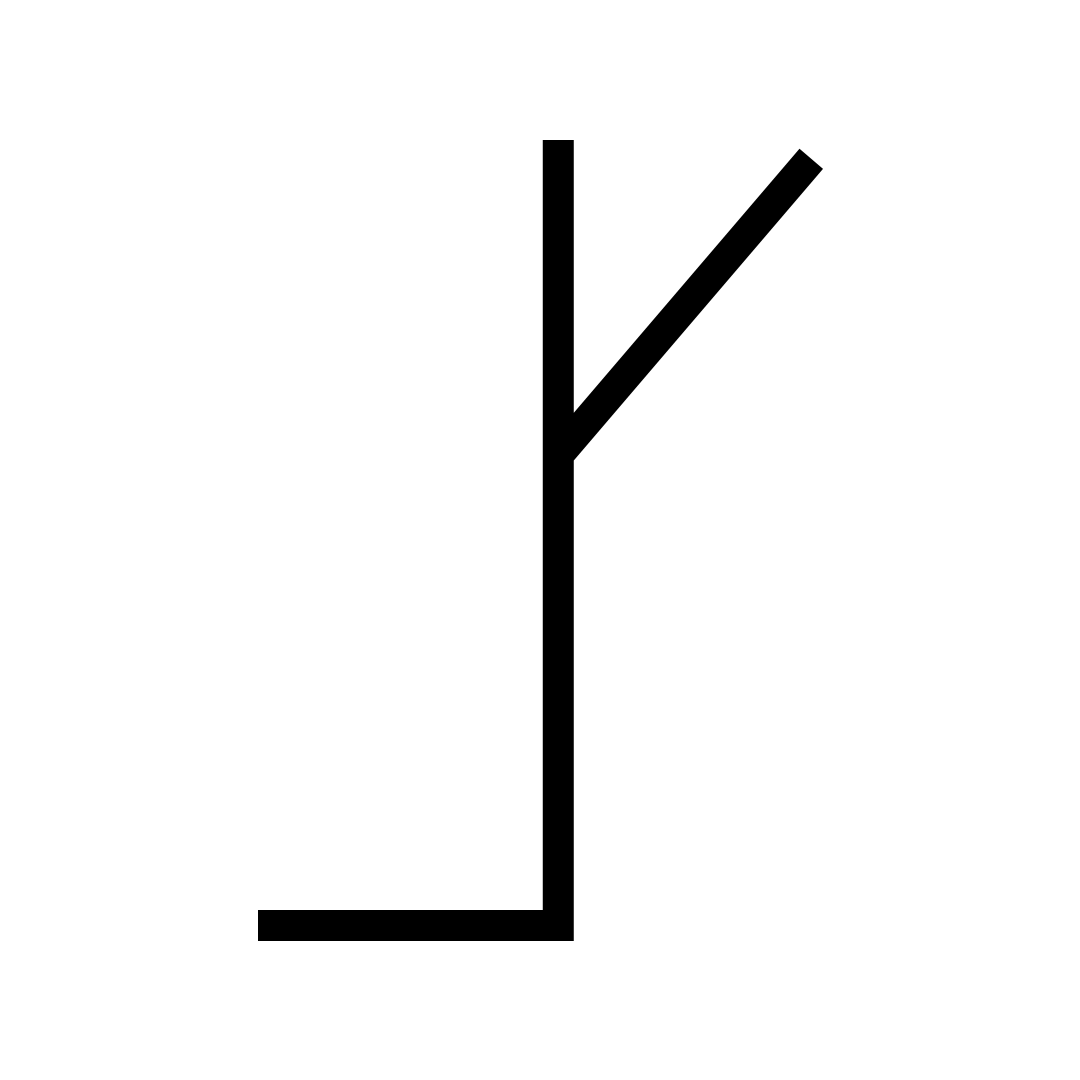
- Tamgha of the Qiziq tribe according to Rashid al-Din Hamadani

Regions with significant populations
- Turkey: Gaziantep, Kahramanmaraş, Bursa, Tokat, Ankara

Languages
- Turkish

Religion
- Islam

Related ethnic groups
- Turkish people

Qiziq (Turkish: Kızık), also spelled Qïzïq, Qyzyk, or Qyzyq, is an Oghuz tribe. The tribe mainly inhabits the provinces of Gaziantep, Kahramanmaraş, Bursa, Tokat, and Ankara in Turkey.

== History ==
Qiziq was included as one of the 24 Oghuz tribes in Jami' al-tawarikh by Rashid al-Din Hamadani but was considered as a Khalaj tribe by Mahmud al-Kashgari. In mid-18th century, Danish traveler Carsten Niebuhr listed Qiziq as a Turkoman tribe with 2000 tents dwelling around Aintab. Until the late 19th century, the tribe's region of settlement fell within the nahiya of Qiziq (in the sanjak of Aintab), named after the tribe.

== Culture ==
A folk dance called Qiziq halay (Turkish: Kızık halayı) is danced around Sivas, Tokat, and Yozgat in Central Anatolia.

== Settlements ==
The tribe inhabits 22 villages in the northern portion of the province of Gaziantep and share several other villages with other tribes. Many of the old names of the Qiziq-inhabited villages bear the name of the tribe.
