= List of municipalities in Gaziantep Province =

This is the List of municipalities in Gaziantep Province, Turkey as of October 2007.

== Municipalities ==
List is sorted alphabetically A-Z, as Districts->Municipalities.

District	Municipality
Araban	Araban
Araban	Elif
İslahiye	Altınüzüm
İslahiye	Boğaziçi
İslahiye	Fevzipaşa
İslahiye	İslahiye
İslahiye	Yeşilyurt
Karkamış	Karkamış
Nizip	Kocatepe
Nizip	Nizip
Nizip	Salkım
Nizip	Sekili
Nizip	Tatlıcak
Nizip	Uluyatır
Nurdağı	Nurdağı
Nurdağı	Sakçagözü
Nurdağı	Şatırhüyük
Oğuzeli	Oğuzeli
Oğuzeli	Yeşildere
Şahinbey	Burç
Şahinbey	Büyükşahinbey
Şahinbey	Cevizli
Şahinbey	Şahinbey
Şehitkamil	Aktoprak
Şehitkamil	Arıl
Şehitkamil	Şehitkamil
Yavuzeli	Yavuzeli

== Changes in 2014 ==
According to Law act no. 6360, belde (town) municipalities within provinces with more than 750,000 population (so called Metropolitan municipalities) were abolished as of 30 March 2014. 13 belde municipalities in the above list are now defunct. The list is kept for historical reference.
