= Cinfelek, Nizip =

Village in Gaziantep Province, Turkey

Cinfelek
- Village
- Location in Turkey
- Coordinates: 36°53′6″N 37°44′0″E
- Country: Turkey
- Province: Gaziantep
- District: Nizip
- Time zone: UTC+3 (TRT)

Cinfelek is a settlement in the Nizip District, Gaziantep Province, Turkey. It is inhabited by Turkmens of the Barak tribe.
