= Zihni =

Zihni can be a masculine given name, a middle name, or a surname. People named Zihni include:

== Given name ==
- Zihni Buzo (1912–2006), Albanian-Australian civil engineer
- Zihni Çakır, Turkish journalist and author
- Zihni Derin (1880–1965), Turkish agronomist
- Zihni Gjinali (1926–2005), Albanian footballer
- Zihni Abaz Kanina (1885–1959), Albanian diplomat

== Middle name ==
- Mustafa Zihni Pasha (1838–1929), Ottoman official

== Surname ==
- Andrew Zihni (born 1977), Hong Kong-born British Anglican priest
