= Düzbayır, Nizip =

Village in Gaziantep Province, Turkey

Düzbayır
- Neighbourhood
- Location in Turkey
- Coordinates: 36.8327°N 37.7334°E
- Country: Turkey
- Province: Gaziantep
- District: Nizip
- Population (2022): 121
- Time zone: UTC+3 (TRT)

Düzbayır, historically İzan, is a neighbourhood in the municipality and district of Nizip, Gaziantep Province, Turkey. The village is inhabited by Turkmens of the Barak tribe and had a population of 121 in 2022.
