= Akkuyu, Nizip =

Village in Gaziantep Province, Turkey

Akkuyu
- Neighbourhood
- Location in Turkey
- Coordinates: 36.8977°N 37.75117°E
- Country: Turkey
- Province: Gaziantep
- District: Nizip
- Population (2022): 109
- Time zone: UTC+3 (TRT)

Akkuyu is a neighbourhood in the municipality and district of Nizip, Gaziantep Province, Turkey. It is inhabited by Turkmens of the Barak tribe and had a population of 109 in 2022.
