= Nahırtepe, Nizip =

Village in Gaziantep Province, Turkey

Nahırtepe
- Neighbourhood
- Location in Turkey
- Coordinates: 36°57′37″N 37°47′44″E
- Country: Turkey
- Province: Gaziantep
- District: Nizip
- Population (2022): 18
- Time zone: UTC+3 (TRT)

Nahırtepe, historically Kerzin, is a neighbourhood in the municipality and district of Nizip, Gaziantep Province, Turkey. The village is inhabited by Turkmens of the Barak tribe and had a population of 18 in 2022.
