= Kıraçgülü, Nizip =

Village in Gaziantep Province, Turkey

Kıraçgülü
- Neighbourhood
- Location in Turkey
- Coordinates: 36.8589°N 37.783°E
- Country: Turkey
- Province: Gaziantep
- District: Nizip
- Population (2022): 56
- Time zone: UTC+3 (TRT)

Kıraçgülü is a neighbourhood in the municipality and district of Nizip, Gaziantep Province, Turkey. The village is inhabited by Turkmens of the Barak tribe and had a population of 56 in 2022.
