= Samandöken, Nizip =

Village in Gaziantep Province, Turkey

Samandöken
- Neighbourhood
- Location in Turkey
- Coordinates: 37°2′36″N 37°50′58″E
- Country: Turkey
- Province: Gaziantep
- District: Nizip
- Population (2022): 837
- Time zone: UTC+3 (TRT)

Samandöken, historically Kehriz, is a neighbourhood in the municipality and district of Nizip, Gaziantep Province, Turkey. The village is inhabited by Turkmens of the Barak tribe and had a population of 837 in 2022.
