= Çakmaktepe, Nizip =

Village in Gaziantep Province, Turkey

Çakmaktepe
- Neighbourhood
- Location in Turkey
- Coordinates: 36°56′3″N 37°46′38″E
- Country: Turkey
- Province: Gaziantep
- District: Nizip
- Population (2022): 137
- Time zone: UTC+3 (TRT)

Çakmaktepe, historically Torun Kersentaş, is a neighbourhood in the municipality and district of Nizip, Gaziantep Province, Turkey. The village is inhabited by Turkmens of the Barak tribe and had a population of 137 in 2022.
