= Kurucahüyük, Nizip =

Village in Gaziantep Province, Turkey

Kurucahüyük
- Neighbourhood
- Location in Turkey
- Coordinates: 36.8756°N 37.7025°E
- Country: Turkey
- Province: Gaziantep
- District: Nizip
- Population (2022): 104
- Time zone: UTC+3 (TRT)

Kurucahüyük is a neighbourhood in the municipality and district of Nizip, Gaziantep Province, Turkey. The village is inhabited by Turkmens of the Barak and Elbegli tribes, and had a population of 104 in 2022.
