= Yolçatı, Nizip =

Village in Gaziantep Province, Turkey

Yolçatı
- Neighbourhood
- Location in Turkey
- Coordinates: 36°59′19″N 37°50′38″E
- Country: Turkey
- Province: Gaziantep
- District: Nizip
- Population (2022): 72
- Time zone: UTC+3 (TRT)

Yolçatı, historically Çirkis, is a neighbourhood in the municipality and district of Nizip, Gaziantep Province, Turkey. The village is inhabited by Turkmens of the Barak tribe and had a population of 72 in 2022.
