= İntepe, Nizip =

Village in Gaziantep Province, Turkey

İntepe
- Neighbourhood
- Location in Turkey
- Coordinates: 36°57′10″N 37°56′36″E
- Country: Turkey
- Province: Gaziantep
- District: Nizip
- Population (2022): 328
- Time zone: UTC+3 (TRT)

İntepe, historically Telmağara or Danaoğlu, is a neighbourhood in the municipality and district of Nizip, Gaziantep Province, Turkey. The village is inhabited by Turkmens of the Barak tribe and had a population of 328 in 2022.
