= Dazhüyük, Nizip =

Village in Gaziantep Province, Turkey

Dazhüyük
- Neighbourhood
- Location in Turkey
- Coordinates: 36°53′36″N 37°50′7″E
- Country: Turkey
- Province: Gaziantep
- District: Nizip
- Population (2022): 184
- Time zone: UTC+3 (TRT)

Dazhüyük is a neighbourhood in the municipality and district of Nizip, Gaziantep Province, Turkey. Its population is 184 (2022). The village is inhabited by Turkmens of the Barak tribe.
