= Mağaracık, Nizip =

Village in Gaziantep Province, Turkey

Mağaracık
- Neighbourhood
- Location in Turkey
- Coordinates: 36°58′26″N 37°47′14″E
- Country: Turkey
- Province: Gaziantep
- District: Nizip
- Population (2022): 59
- Time zone: UTC+3 (TRT)

Mağaracık is a neighbourhood in the municipality and district of Nizip, Gaziantep Province, Turkey. The village is inhabited by Turkmens of the Barak tribe and had a population of 59 in 2022.
