= Yağmuralan, Nizip =

Village in Gaziantep Province, Turkey

Yağmuralan
- Neighbourhood
- Location in Turkey
- Coordinates: 36.9195°N 37.7511°E
- Country: Turkey
- Province: Gaziantep
- District: Nizip
- Population (2022): 281
- Time zone: UTC+3 (TRT)

Yağmuralan, historically Muzerrin (Turkish: Mizirin or Mirzin), is a neighbourhood in the municipality and district of Nizip, Gaziantep Province, Turkey. The village had a population of 281 in 2022. The village is inhabited by Turkmens of the Barak tribe.
