= Kesiktaş, Nizip =

Village in Gaziantep Province, Turkey

Kesiktaş
- Neighbourhood
- Location in Turkey
- Coordinates: 36.8712°N 37.7319°E
- Country: Turkey
- Province: Gaziantep
- District: Nizip
- Population (2022): 224
- Time zone: UTC+3 (TRT)

Kesiktaş, historically Kürdili Kersentaş, is a neighbourhood in the municipality and district of Nizip, Gaziantep Province, Turkey. The village is inhabited by Turkmens of the Barak tribe and had a population of 224 in 2022.
