= Çatalca, Nizip =

Village in Gaziantep Province, Turkey

Çatalca
- Neighbourhood
- Location in Turkey
- Coordinates: 36°54′7″N 37°41′36″E
- Country: Turkey
- Province: Gaziantep
- District: Nizip
- Population (2022): 153
- Time zone: UTC+3 (TRT)

Çatalca is a neighbourhood in the municipality and district of Nizip, Gaziantep Province, Turkey. Its population is 153 (2022). The village is inhabited by Turkmens of the Barak tribe.
