= Söğütlü, Nizip =

Village in Gaziantep Province, Turkey

Söğütlü
- Neighbourhood
- Location in Turkey
- Coordinates: 37°0′13″N 37°43′38″E
- Country: Turkey
- Province: Gaziantep
- District: Nizip
- Population (2022): 75
- Time zone: UTC+3 (TRT)

Söğütlü is a neighbourhood in the municipality and district of Nizip, Gaziantep Province, Turkey. The village is inhabited by Turkmens of the Barak tribe and had a population of 75 in 2022.
