= Doğrular, Nizip =

Village in Gaziantep Province, Turkey

Doğrular
- Neighbourhood
- Location in Turkey
- Coordinates: 36°57′23″N 37°45′41″E
- Country: Turkey
- Province: Gaziantep
- District: Nizip
- Population (2022): 1,871
- Time zone: UTC+3 (TRT)

Doğrular, historically Keferşıh, is a neighbourhood in the municipality and district of Nizip, Gaziantep Province, Turkey. The village is inhabited by Turkmens of the Barak tribe and had a population of 1,871 in 2022.
