= Gökçeli, Nizip =

Village in Gaziantep Province, Turkey

Gökçeli
- Neighbourhood
- Location in Turkey
- Coordinates: 36°52′48″N 37°42′9″E
- Country: Turkey
- Province: Gaziantep
- District: Nizip
- Population (2022): 373
- Time zone: UTC+3 (TRT)

Gökçeli, historically Kürep, is a neighbourhood in the municipality and district of Nizip, Gaziantep Province, Turkey. The village is inhabited by Turkmens of the Barak tribe and had a population of 373 in 2022.
