= Belkıs, Nizip =

Village in Gaziantep Province, Turkey

Belkıs
- Neighbourhood
- Location in Turkey
- Coordinates: 37.0469°N 37.873°E
- Country: Turkey
- Province: Gaziantep
- District: Nizip
- Population (2022): 196
- Time zone: UTC+3 (TRT)

Belkıs is a neighbourhood in the municipality and district of Nizip, Gaziantep Province, Turkey. The village is inhabited by Turkmens of the Barak tribe and had a population of 196 in 2022.
