= Kızılcakent, Nizip =

Village in Gaziantep Province, Turkey

Kızılcakent
- Neighbourhood
- Location in Turkey
- Coordinates: 37°2′48″N 37°46′13″E
- Country: Turkey
- Province: Gaziantep
- District: Nizip
- Population (2022): 272
- Time zone: UTC+3 (TRT)

Kızılcakent is a neighbourhood in the municipality and district of Nizip, Gaziantep Province, Turkey. The village had a population of 272 in 2022.
