= Keklik, Nizip =

Village in Gaziantep Province, Turkey

Keklik
- Neighbourhood
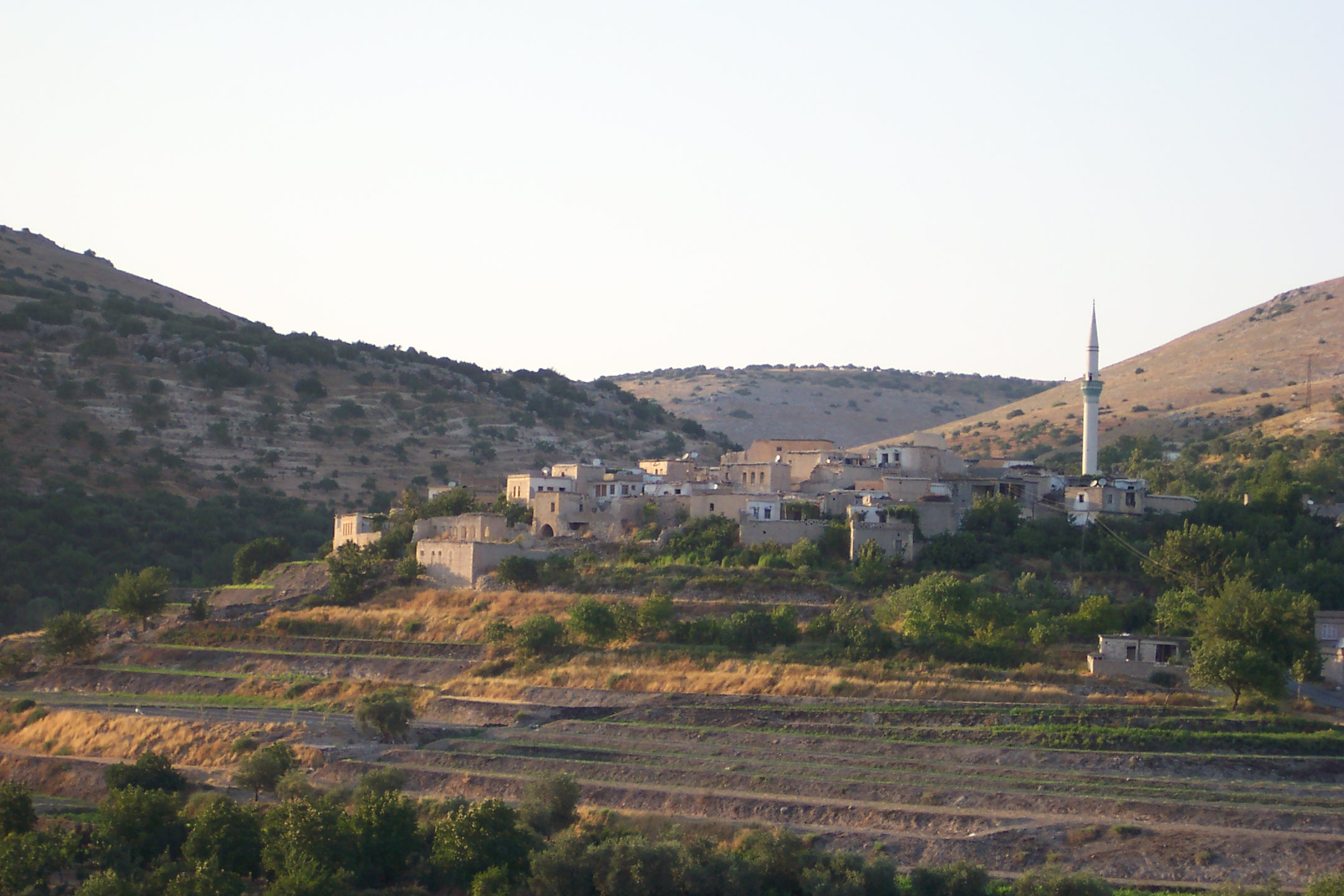
- A view of Zergil from 2007

- Location within Turkey
- Coordinates: 37°4′54″N 37°48′52″E
- Country: Turkey
- Province: Gaziantep
- District: Nizip
- Population (2022): 183
- Time zone: UTC+3 (TRT)

Keklik, historically Zergil (Kurdish: Zergîl), is a neighbourhood in the municipality and district of Nizip, Gaziantep Province, Turkey. The village is inhabited by Kurds of the Reşwan tribe and had a population of 183 in 2022.

== Gallery ==
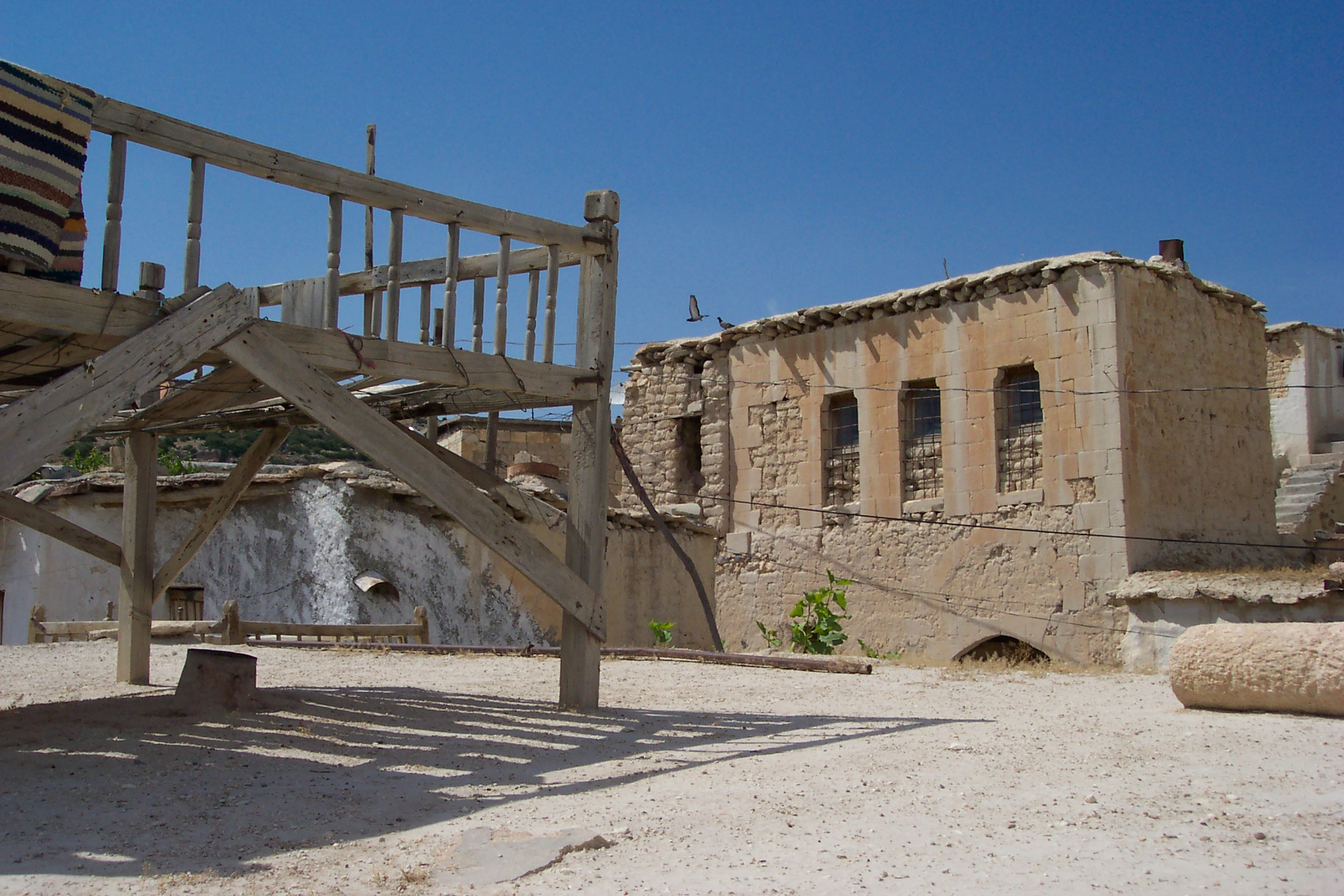
Historic houses of Zergil

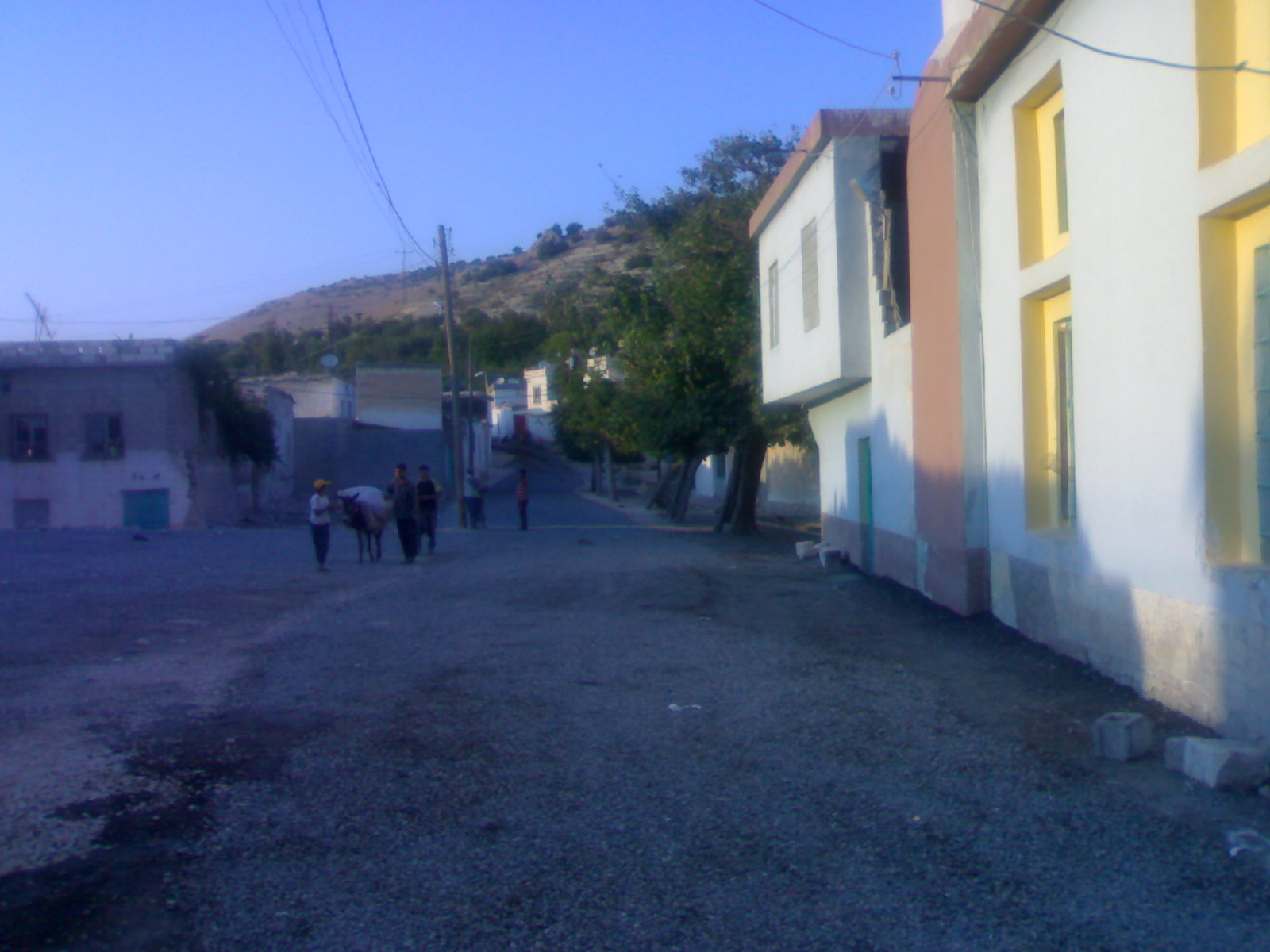
Maidan of Zergil
