= Salkım, Nizip =

Village in Gaziantep Province, Turkey

Salkım
- Neighbourhood
- Location in Turkey
- Coordinates: 37.151°N 37.692°E
- Country: Turkey
- Province: Gaziantep
- District: Nizip
- Population (2022): 870
- Time zone: UTC+3 (TRT)

Salkım, historically and still known as Hıyam, is a neighbourhood of the municipality and district of Nizip, Gaziantep Province, Turkey. The village is populated by Turkmens of the Barak tribe and had a population of 870 in 2022. Before the 2013 reorganisation, it was a town (belde).
