= Tuluktaş, Nizip =

Village in Gaziantep Province, Turkey

Tuluktaş
- Neighbourhood
- Location in Turkey
- Coordinates: 37°3′14″N 37°44′12″E
- Country: Turkey
- Province: Gaziantep
- District: Nizip
- Population (2022): 133
- Time zone: UTC+3 (TRT)

Tuluktaş, historically Fenk (lit. 'monastery'), is a neighbourhood in the municipality and district of Nizip, Gaziantep Province, Turkey. The village had a population of 133 in 2022.
