= Gaziler, Nizip =

Village in Gaziantep Province, Turkey

Gaziler
- Neighbourhood
- Location in Turkey
- Coordinates: 37°11′30″N 37°44′12″E
- Country: Turkey
- Province: Gaziantep
- District: Nizip
- Population (2022): 227
- Time zone: UTC+3 (TRT)

Gaziler is a neighbourhood in the municipality and district of Nizip, Gaziantep Province, Turkey. The village had a population of 227 in 2022.
