= Adaklı, Nizip =

Village in Gaziantep Province, Turkey

Adaklı
- Neighbourhood
- Location in Turkey
- Coordinates: 37°10′7″N 37°40′42″E
- Country: Turkey
- Province: Gaziantep
- District: Nizip
- Population (2022): 585
- Time zone: UTC+3 (TRT)

Adaklı, historically Keret, is a neighbourhood in the municipality and district of Nizip, Gaziantep Province, Turkey. The village is inhabited by Turkmens and had a population of 585 in 2022.
