= Akçakent, Nizip =

Village in Gaziantep Province, Turkey

Akçakent
- Neighbourhood
- Location in Turkey
- Coordinates: 37°1′55″N 37°46′24″E
- Country: Turkey
- Province: Gaziantep
- District: Nizip
- Population (2022): 915
- Time zone: UTC+3 (TRT)

Akçakent is a neighbourhood in the municipality and district of Nizip, Gaziantep Province, Turkey. The village had a population of 915 in 2022.
