= Köseler, Nizip =

Village in Gaziantep Province, Turkey

Köseler
- Neighbourhood
- Location in Turkey
- Coordinates: 37°14′34″N 37°48′13″E
- Country: Turkey
- Province: Gaziantep
- District: Nizip
- Population (2022): 386
- Time zone: UTC+3 (TRT)

Köseler is a neighbourhood in the municipality and district of Nizip, Gaziantep Province, Turkey. The village is inhabited by Turkmens from the Chepni tribe and had a population of 386 in 2022.
