= Dernek, Nizip =

Village in Gaziantep Province, Turkey

Dernek
- Neighbourhood
- Location in Turkey
- Coordinates: 37°12′52″N 37°41′21″E
- Country: Turkey
- Province: Gaziantep
- District: Nizip
- Population (2022): 215
- Time zone: UTC+3 (TRT)

Dernek is a neighbourhood in the municipality and district of Nizip, Gaziantep Province, Turkey. The village had a population of 215 in 2022.
