= Yukarıçardak, Nizip =

Village in Gaziantep Province, Turkey

Yukarıçardak
- Neighbourhood
- Location in Turkey
- Coordinates: 37°8′30″N 37°51′14″E
- Country: Turkey
- Province: Gaziantep
- District: Nizip
- Population (2022): 161
- Time zone: UTC+3 (TRT)

Yukarıçardak is a neighbourhood in the municipality and district of Nizip, Gaziantep Province, Turkey. The village is inhabited by Kurds of the Reşwan tribe and had a population of 161 in 2022.
