= Kale, Nizip =

Village in Gaziantep Province, Turkey

Kale
- Neighbourhood
- Location in Turkey
- Coordinates: 36°56′47″N 37°50′10″E
- Country: Turkey
- Province: Gaziantep
- District: Nizip
- Population (2022): 174
- Time zone: UTC+3 (TRT)

Kale is a neighbourhood in the municipality and district of Nizip, Gaziantep Province, Turkey. The village had a population of 174 in 2022.
