= Kayalar, Nizip =

Village in Gaziantep Province, Turkey

Kayalar
- Neighbourhood
- Location in Turkey
- Coordinates: 37°13′27″N 37°46′4″E
- Country: Turkey
- Province: Gaziantep
- District: Nizip
- Population (2022): 255
- Time zone: UTC+3 (TRT)

Kayalar is a neighbourhood in the municipality and district of Nizip, Gaziantep Province, Turkey. The village had a population of 255 in 2022.
