= Altındağ, Nizip =

Village in Gaziantep Province, Turkey

Altındağ
- Neighbourhood
- Location in Turkey
- Coordinates: 37°5′27″N 37°42′16″E
- Country: Turkey
- Province: Gaziantep
- District: Nizip
- Population (2022): 329
- Time zone: UTC+3 (TRT)

Altındağ, historically Kefercebel, is a neighbourhood in the municipality and district of Nizip, Gaziantep Province, Turkey. It had a population of 329 in 2022.
