= Gümüşgün, Nizip =

Village in Gaziantep Province, Turkey

Gümüşgün
- Neighbourhood
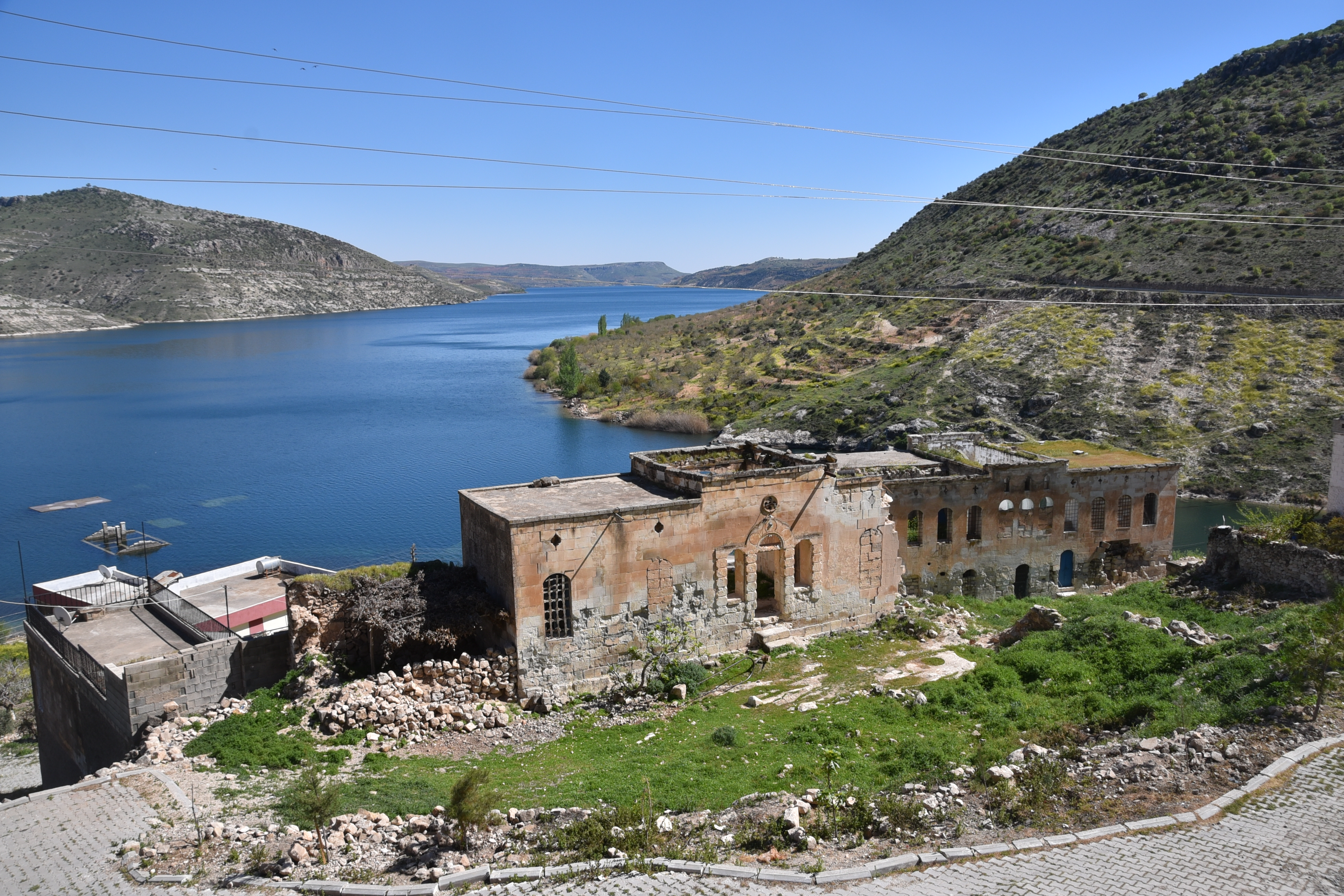
- The view of the Euphrates and the historic houses of Ehnesh

- Location within Turkey
- Coordinates: 37°12′3″N 37°49′45″E
- Country: Turkey
- Province: Gaziantep
- District: Nizip
- Population (2022): 60
- Time zone: UTC+3 (TRT)

Gümüşgün, historically Ehnesh or Ehneş, is a neighbourhood in the municipality and district of Nizip, Gaziantep Province, Turkey. The village had a population of 60 in 2022.

== History ==
The village, along with the region, was initially inhabited by Syrian Jacobite Christians, who were deported by the Byzantines in 777 to various places including the Balkans and later Ramla in Palestine. The region then experienced a demographic shift from Syrian to Armenian, and prior to the Armenian genocide, the village was entirely inhabited by Armenians. In the 1930s, a rich Jewish landlord from Aintab possessed a lot of land in the village, which was noted as Kurdish. The village is inhabited by Muhacir Turks from Thessaloniki who settled in the village after the Balkan Wars and the population exchange between Greece and Turkey.

== Bibliography ==
- Palmer, Andrew (1993). Hokwerda, Hero; Smits, Edmé Renno; Woesthuis, Marinus M. (eds.). "The Messiah and the Mahdi History Presented as the Writing on the Wall". Polyphonia Byzantina, Studies in Honour of Willem J. Aerts. Groningen: Egbert Forsten: 45–84.
