= Yeniyazı, Nizip =

Village in Gaziantep Province, Turkey

Yeniyazı
- Neighbourhood
- Location in Turkey
- Coordinates: 37°4′36″N 37°43′40″E
- Country: Turkey
- Province: Gaziantep
- District: Nizip
- Population (2022): 1,615
- Time zone: UTC+3 (TRT)

Yeniyazı, historically Cidet, is a neighbourhood in the municipality and district of Nizip, Gaziantep Province, Turkey. The village is inhabited by Turks and had a population of 1,615 in 2022.
