= Mehmetobası, Nizip =

Village in Gaziantep Province, Turkey

Mehmetobası
- Neighbourhood
- Location in Turkey
- Coordinates: 37°9′46″N 37°44′11″E
- Country: Turkey
- Province: Gaziantep
- District: Nizip
- Population (2022): 205
- Time zone: UTC+3 (TRT)

Mehmetobası (Kurdish: Pala) is a neighbourhood in the municipality and district of Nizip, Gaziantep Province, Turkey. The village is inhabited by Kurds of the Reşwan tribe and had a population of 205 in 2022.
