= Cahit Tanyol =

Turkish writer, poet, and sociologist (1914–2020)

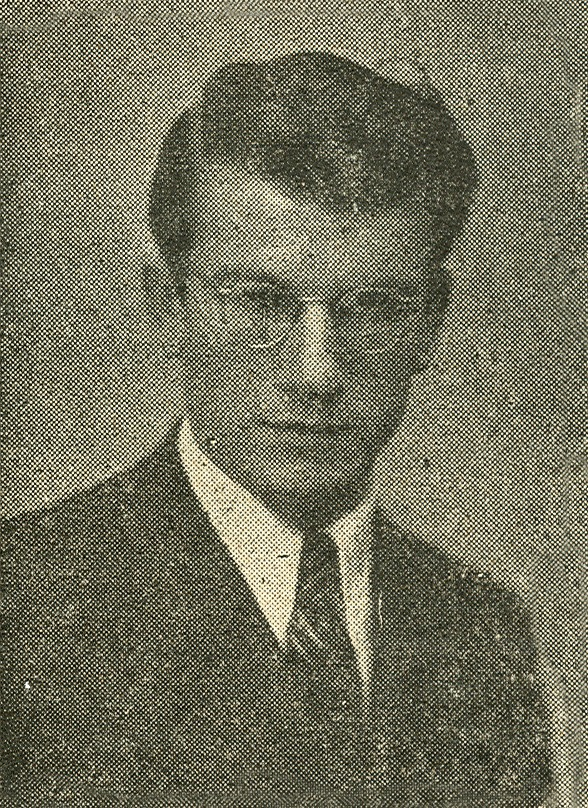
- Tanyol in early 20th century
- Born: 1914; Nezib, Ottoman Empire
- Died: 11 August 2020 (aged 106); Moda, Istanbul, Turkey
- Resting place: Karacaahmet Cemetery
- Occupation: Teacher, Academician
- Language: Turkish; French; English
- Education: Gazi Institute of Education, Istanbul University
- Spouse: Fethiye Tanyol
- Children: 2

Hüseyin Cahit Tanyol (1914 – 11 August 2020) was a Turkish writer, poet, and sociologist, often regarded as the father of Turkish sociology.

== Early life and education ==
Hüseyin Cahit was born in 1914 in the town of Nezib, then located in the vilayet of Aleppo, Ottoman Empire. In 1931, he finished Adana Boys' Teacher School. He graduated from Gazi Institute of Education in 1935. In 1940, he started studying philosophy at Istanbul University and got his master's degree four years later with his thesis "The Origin of Ethics in Schopenhauer." He started working as an assistant at the same university in 1946 and got his PhD with his work "The Place of Pleasure and Suffering in Morality."

== Career ==
While he was working as a teacher in İzmir in 1939, he started publishing Aramak, a Turkish literary magazine, receiving acclaim from well-known Turkish authors at the time. He became an associate professor in 1953 and a professor in 1961. Between 1972 and 1982, he served as the head of the department of sociology at Istanbul University. Between 1991 and 2003, he was a visiting professor in Mimar Sinan University and Uludağ University.

== Works ==
Cahit Tanyol made field research on several rural ethnic groups living near his hometown, Nizip, such as Kurds of the Reshwan tribe and Turkmens of Barak and Chepni tribes.

=== Books ===
==== Poetry ====
- Kuruluş ve Fetih Destanı (1969)
- Son Liman (1992)
- Düş Yorgunu (2001)

==== Non-fiction ====
- Örf ve Adetler Bakımından Sanat ve Ahlâk (1952)
- Sosyal Ahlâk - Laik Ahlâka Giriş (1960)
- Sosyolojik Açıdan Din-Ahlâk-Laiklik ve Politika Üzerine Diyaloglar (1970)
- Atatürk ve Halkçılık (1982)
- Türk Edebiyatında Yahya Kemal (1985)
- Laiklik ve İrtica (1989)
- Çankaya Dramı (1990)
- Türkler ile Kürtler (1993)
- Schopenhauer'da Ahlâk Felsefesi (1998)
- Neden Türban? Şeriat ve İrtica (2002)
- Hoca Kadri Efendi'nin Parlamentosu (2003)
- Mamato (2012)
- Sancılı Toprak (2014)

== Views ==
Tanyol often criticized the ideological dynamics in Turkey:

"From elementary school to university, we teach the revolutions, Kemalism; graduating students either become Marxist or Nurcu."

As a non-Kurd, he touched on the Kurdish issue:

"Accepting Kurds as one of us is different from arousing the notion of a denial of Kurds' Kurdishness as if it's shameful. Political parties' urge to reassure that no one is a second-class citizen in this country whenever they are touring the southeastern region is similar to shouting 'from now on, no one will call Giaours Giaour' during the Second Constitutional Era."

== Controversies ==
After the death of Tanyol, a video of him from 2018, then aged 104, was released by one of his former students. In the video, he was confronted by his former students and shown declaring support for president Recep Tayyip Erdoğan. This video was aired by regime-sided media along with an article by the confronting student on Anadolu Agency. The video received great criticism, especially from Tanyol's son, Tuğrul Tanyol, who regarded the video as "disgusting" and "an insult to [Tanyol's] memory." He underlined that Tanyol had a leftist background and previously fiercely criticized Erdoğan's original political movement, Millî Görüş. Tuğrul Tanyol further mentioned his father's encroaching dementia and that his father never voted for Erdoğan's party.

== Personal life ==
Cahit Tanyol was married to Fethiye. He had one son, named Tuğrul, and one daughter, Bilge.
