= Tanır, Nizip =

Village in Gaziantep Province, Turkey

Tanır
- Neighbourhood
- Location in Turkey
- Coordinates: 37°6′32″N 37°48′51″E
- Country: Turkey
- Province: Gaziantep
- District: Nizip
- Population (2022): 61
- Time zone: UTC+3 (TRT)

Tanır, historically Kilisecik (lit. 'little church'), is a neighbourhood in the municipality and district of Nizip, Gaziantep Province, Turkey. The village is inhabited by Turkmens and had a population of 61 in 2022.

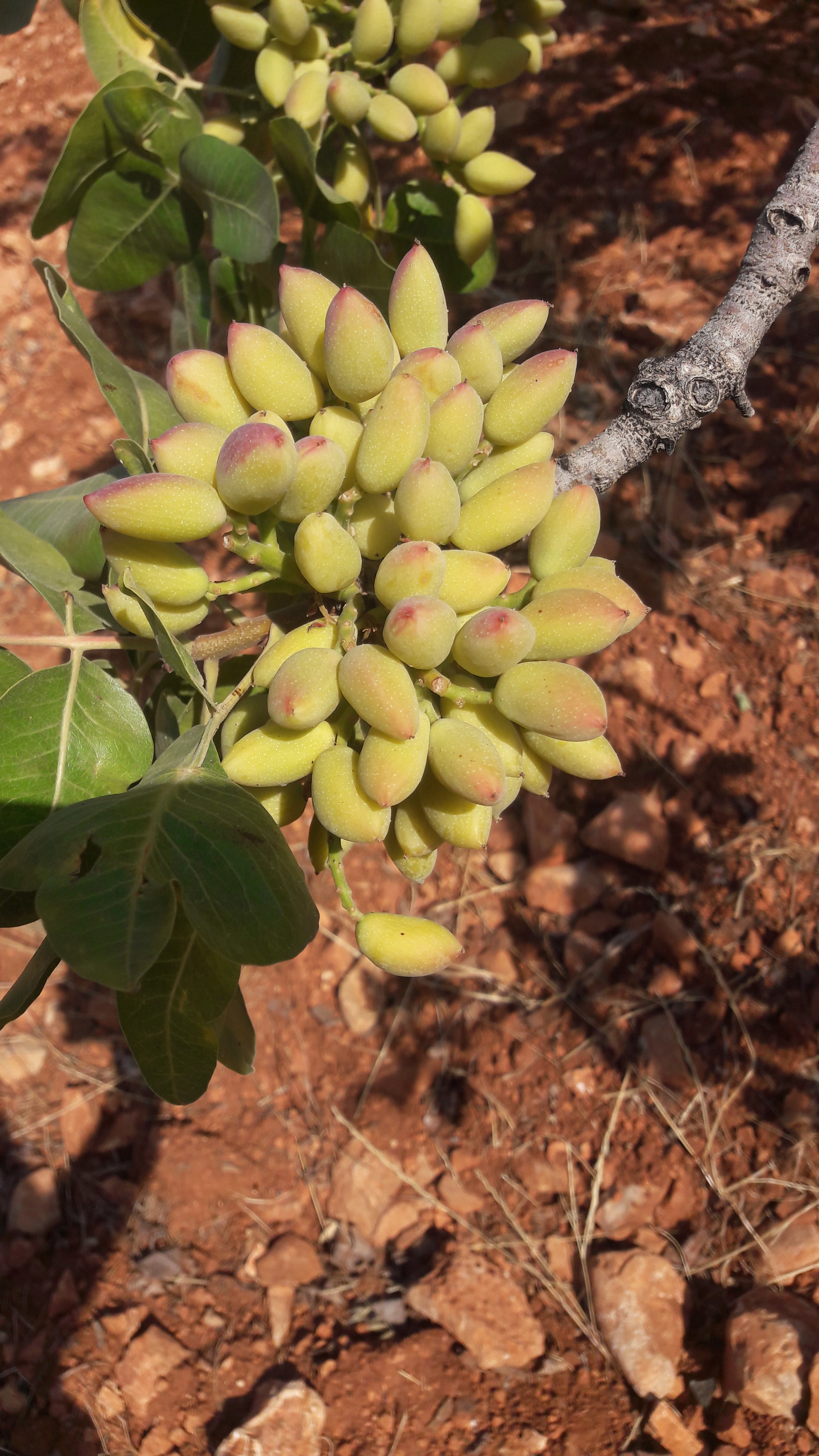
Pistachio from Tanır
