= Ballı, Nizip =

Village in Gaziantep Province, Turkey

Ballı
- Neighbourhood
- Location in Turkey
- Coordinates: 37°11′44″N 37°48′7″E
- Country: Turkey
- Province: Gaziantep
- District: Nizip
- Population (2022): 185
- Time zone: UTC+3 (TRT)

Ballı is a neighbourhood in the municipality and district of Nizip, Gaziantep Province, Turkey. The village had a population of 185 in 2022.
