= Turlu, Nizip =

Village in Gaziantep Province, Turkey

Turlu
- Neighbourhood
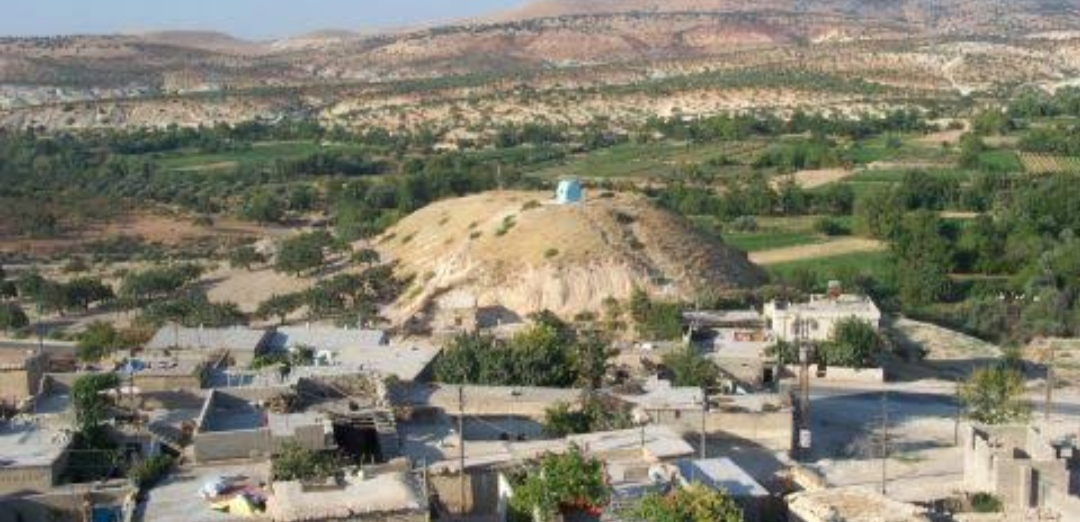
- Historic tell in the village

- Location within Turkey
- Coordinates: 37°4′8″N 37°45′31″E
- Country: Turkey
- Province: Gaziantep
- District: Nizip
- Population (2022): 355
- Time zone: UTC+3 (TRT)

Turlu is a neighbourhood in the municipality and district of Nizip, Gaziantep Province, Turkey. The village had a population of 355 in 2022.
