= Sarıkoç, Nizip =

Village in Gaziantep Province, Turkey

Sarıkoç
- Neighbourhood
- Location within Turkey
- Coordinates: 36°53′39″N 37°48′29″E
- Country: Turkey
- Province: Gaziantep
- District: Nizip
- Population (2022): 192
- Time zone: UTC+3 (TRT)

Sarıkoç is a neighbourhood in the municipality and district of Nizip, Gaziantep Province, Turkey. The village had a population of 192 in 2022.
