= Çanakçı, Nizip =

Village in Gaziantep Province, Turkey

Çanakçı
- Neighbourhood
- Location in Turkey
- Coordinates: 37°6′54″N 37°44′40″E
- Country: Turkey
- Province: Gaziantep
- District: Nizip
- Population (2022): 457
- Time zone: UTC+3 (TRT)

Çanakçı is a neighbourhood in the municipality and district of Nizip, Gaziantep Province, Turkey. The village is inhabited by Kurds of the Reşwan tribe and had a population of 457 in 2022.

== Notable people ==
- Celal Doğan (born 1943), former mayor of Gaziantep and president of Gaziantep F.K., lawyer, and politician
