= Toydemir, Nizip =

Village in Gaziantep Province, Turkey

Toydemir
- Neighbourhood
- Location in Turkey
- Coordinates: 37°6′46″N 37°50′44″E
- Country: Turkey
- Province: Gaziantep
- District: Nizip
- Population (2022): 84
- Time zone: UTC+3 (TRT)

Toydemir, historically Acemi, is a neighbourhood in the municipality and district of Nizip, Gaziantep Province, Turkey. The village had a population of 84 in 2022.
