= Saray, Nizip =

Village in Gaziantep Province, Turkey

Saray
- Neighbourhood
- Location in Turkey
- Coordinates: 37°02′13″N 37°57′54″E
- Country: Turkey
- Province: Gaziantep
- District: Nizip
- Population (2022): 571
- Time zone: UTC+3 (TRT)

Saray is a neighbourhood in the municipality and district of Nizip, Gaziantep Province, Turkey. The village had a population of 571 in 2022.
