= Güder, Nizip =

Village in Gaziantep Province, Turkey

Güder
- Neighbourhood
- Location in Turkey
- Coordinates: 37°10′12″N 37°46′18″E
- Country: Turkey
- Province: Gaziantep
- District: Nizip
- Population (2022): 244
- Time zone: UTC+3 (TRT)

Güder (Kurdish: Kuştam) is a neighbourhood in the municipality and district of Nizip, Gaziantep Province, Turkey. The village is inhabited by Kurds of the Reşwan tribe and had a population of 244 in 2022.
