= Kocatepe, Nizip =

Village in Gaziantep Province, Turkey

Kocatepe
- Neighbourhood
- Location in Turkey
- Coordinates: 37°2′27″N 37°41′31″E
- Country: Turkey
- Province: Gaziantep
- District: Nizip
- Population (2022): 1,216
- Time zone: UTC+3 (TRT)

Kocatepe, historically Tilfar (lit. 'mouse's tell'), is a neighbourhood of the municipality and district of Nizip, Gaziantep Province, Turkey. Its population is 1,216 (2022). Before the 2013 reorganisation, it was a town (belde).

It is populated by Turkmens of the Barak tribe.
