= Sekili, Nizip =

Village in Gaziantep Province, Turkey

Sekili
- Neighbourhood
- Location in Turkey
- Coordinates: 36°58′42″N 37°40′19″E
- Country: Turkey
- Province: Gaziantep
- District: Nizip
- Population (2022): 1,253
- Time zone: UTC+3 (TRT)

Sekili, historically Orul, is a neighbourhood of the municipality and district of Nizip, Gaziantep Province, Turkey. Its population is 1,253 (2022). Before the 2013 reorganisation, it was a town (belde). The town was inhabited by Armenians until the Armenian genocide as well as some Turkmens. The town is inhabited by Turkmens from the Barak tribe.
