= Boyluca, Nizip =

Village in Gaziantep Province, Turkey

Boyluca
- Neighbourhood
- Location in Turkey
- Coordinates: 37°11′15″N 37°37′51″E
- Country: Turkey
- Province: Gaziantep
- District: Nizip
- Population (2022): 290
- Time zone: UTC+3 (TRT)

Boyluca, historically Peşke Binamlı, is a neighbourhood in the municipality and district of Nizip, Gaziantep Province, Turkey. The village is inhabited by Kurds of the Reşwan tribe and had a population of 290 in 2022.
