= Kamışlı, Nizip =

Village in Gaziantep Province, Turkey

Kamışlı
- Neighbourhood
- Location in Turkey
- Coordinates: 37°14′11″N 37°50′25″E
- Country: Turkey
- Province: Gaziantep
- District: Nizip
- Population (2022): 391
- Time zone: UTC+3 (TRT)

Kamışlı is a neighbourhood in the municipality and district of Nizip, Gaziantep Province, Turkey. The village is inhabited by Kurds of the Reşwan tribe and had a population of 391 in 2022.
