= Alahacı, Nizip =

Village in Gaziantep Province, Turkey

Alahacı
- Neighbourhood
- Location in Turkey
- Coordinates: 37°13′0″N 37°46′17″E
- Country: Turkey
- Province: Gaziantep
- District: Nizip
- Population (2022): 1,428
- Time zone: UTC+3 (TRT)

Alahacı is a neighbourhood in the municipality and district of Nizip, Gaziantep Province, Turkey. The village is inhabited by Kurds of the Reşwan tribe and had a population of 1,428 in 2022.
