= Itbarak =

Dog headed Turkic mythological creatures

Itbaraks (English: Shaggy Dog) or just Baraks are Turkic mythological creatures. They were "dog headed, dark coloured manly creatures". According to the Oghuz Khagan Narratives, their country was in the "unknown northwest". It can be assumed that it's around today's Siberia. Oghuz tried to invade them but couldn't succeed, so he had to retreat to a small island.

== Dog-headed men ==
A huge part of Oghuz Khagan Narratives was about "invasions on dog-headed men". Turks called them "Itbaraks". "It" means "dog" and "Barak" means a dark, shaggy dog species. After Oghuz Khagan's invasion on Itbaraks failed, he retreated to a small island, where one of his soldiers' widows gave birth. Oghuz Khagan and his people had no home or tent, so the woman gave birth in a hollow. Oghuz named this child "Kıpçak (Kipchak)", meaning "hollow" in Old Turkic.

When Oghuz Khagan had invaded Itbarak lands after 17 years, he gave the lands to Kıpçak to rule. Year after years, Kıpçak's lineage has believed to become the old Turkic tribe Kipchaks.

== Oghuz Khagan Narratives ==
The text about Itbaraks in the Narratives:

"Barak", that's what the Turks called the shaggy dog.
That's how they named the big noble dog.
The Barak is told in the sagas.
It was believed to be other dogs ancestor.
This dog was noble, and enormously big.
Hunting and shepherd dogs was his sons.

In the Northwestern Asia, there was Itbarak.
Turks were far away from them in the Middle Asia.
They had body of a man, head of a dog.
Their color was dark, like the Black Devil.
Their women was pretty and didn't run away from the Turks.
They were medicated, you couldn't spear them.

The saga said Oghuz Khagan was defeated.
He tried to recover on the island he retreated.
After seventeen years, Oghuz defeated them.
Women helped him, and the war has ended.
Oghuz gave this territory to "Kıpçak-Beg"
So Turks called the area "Kıpçak".

== Similarities to other mythologies ==
Stories about "Dog-headed men" can be found on many other mythologies. Europeans called them "Borus" and believed they were living in northern parts of today's Northern Europe. The itbaraks were believed to live in nearly the same area.
