= Zihni Çakır =

Turkish journalist and author

Zihni Çakır (born 1969, Nizip) is a Turkish journalist and author known for publishing several books on the Ergenekon organization.

== Background ==
Çakır was born in 1969 in Nizip, Gaziantep Province, and graduated from Ankara University Faculty of Communication. He worked in various media as a correspondent and in managerial roles; at one point he was editor-in-chief of Türkeli, a publication associated with Vatansever Kuvvetler Güç Birliği Hareketi.

== Books ==
Çakır has published several books on the Ergenekon organization.

In 2008 Çakır was sentenced to 18 months in prison for "violating the secrecy of an investigation" in relation to the Ergenekon trials. In 2009 Çakır complained that a court had forced him to reveal sources relating to his book Kod adı darbe. Among other topics this book "argued that [Özdemir] Sabancı’s murder was organized by Abdullah Çatlı, Hüseyin Kocadağ and military officer Hüseyin Pepekal."

Çakır said in 2008 that the head of Ergenekon, known to him only as "Number One", was involved in the 1997 military memorandum. He later told the Ergenekon trials that the man had visited the Türkeli newspaper while he worked there.

== Bibliography ==
- Ergenekon'un çöküşü ("The Collapse of Ergenekon"), NEDEN? KİTAP, 2008
- Kod adı darbe: Gizli Belgeler, Telefon Dinleme Kayıtları ve Krokilerle Ergenekon'un Kodları ("Codename coup"), NEDEN? KİTAP, 2008
- Ergenekon'un çöküşü 2: Dünden bugüne devletin derinliklerindeki kirli ilişkiler, NEDEN? KİTAP, 2008
- Gladio Korku İmparatorluğu , PROFİL YAYINCILIK, 2009
- Konsept Savaşı: Ercümen-i Daniş Sarmalında
