= Tatlıcak, Nizip =

Village in Gaziantep Province, Turkey

Tatlıcak
- Neighbourhood
- Location in Turkey
- Coordinates: 37°8′7″N 37°45′10″E
- Country: Turkey
- Province: Gaziantep
- District: Nizip
- Population (2022): 1,098
- Time zone: UTC+3 (TRT)

Tatlıcak is a neighbourhood of the municipality and district of Nizip, Gaziantep Province, Turkey. Its population is 1,098 (2022). Before the 2013 reorganisation, it was a town (belde). The village is inhabited by Kurds of the Reşwan tribe.
