= Uluyatır, Nizip =

Uluyatır
- Neighbourhood
- Location in Turkey
- Coordinates: 36°57′45″N 37°41′43″E
- Country: Turkey
- Province: Gaziantep
- District: Nizip
- Population (2022): 1,840
- Time zone: UTC+3 (TRT)

Uluyatır, also known as Mizar, is a neighbourhood of the municipality and district of Nizip, Gaziantep Province, Turkey. Its population is 1,840 (2022). Before the 2013 reorganisation, it was a town (belde). Uluyatır is inhabited by Turkmens.
