= Nizip =

- District and municipality
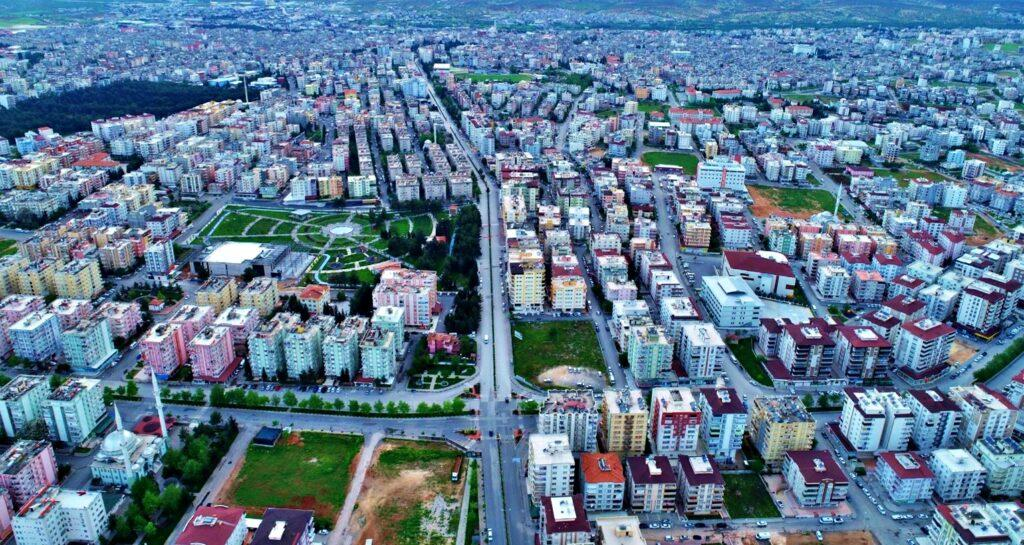
- General view of Nizip

- Logo

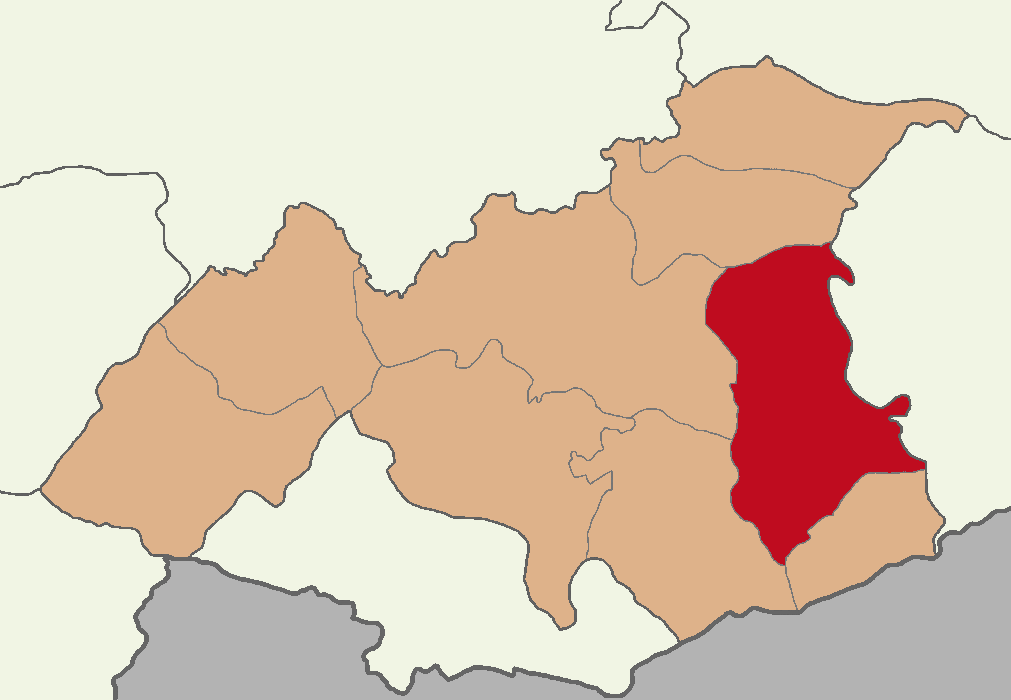
- Map showing Nizip District in Gaziantep Province

- Location within Turkey
- Coordinates: 37°00′36″N 37°47′50″E
- Country: Turkey
- Province: Gaziantep

Government
  - Mayor: Ali Doğan (CHP)
- Area: 944 km^{2} (364 sq mi)
- Population (2022): 148,386
  - Density: 157/km^{2} (407/sq mi)
- Time zone: UTC+3 (TRT)
- Postal code: 27700
- Area code: 0342
- Website: www.nizip.bel.tr

Nizip (Medieval Greek: Nisibis or Nisibina; Ottoman Turkish: نزيب) is a municipality and district of Gaziantep Province, Turkey. Its area is 944 km^{2}, and its population is 148,386 (2022).

It is located 45 km from the city of Gaziantep, 95 km from Şanlıurfa (Edessa), and 35 km from Karkamış.

== Demographics ==
In early 20th century, the town housed 15,000 people and was mostly inhabited by Turks.

== Composition ==
There are 109 neighbourhoods in Nizip District:

- Adaklı
- Akçakent
- Akkuyu
- Alahacı
- Altındağ
- Aşağıbayındır
- Aşağıçardak
- Atatürk
- Bağlıca
- Bahçeli
- Ballı
- Belkıs
- Boyluca
- Bozalioğlu
- Çakmaktepe
- Çanakçı
- Çatalca
- Cumhuriyet
- Dayıdağı
- Dazhüyük
- Dernek
- Doğrular
- Duraklı
- Dutlu
- Düzbayır
- Ekinci
- Erenköy
- Eskikonak
- Eyüp Sultan
- Fatih Sultan
- Fevkani
- Fevzipaşa
- Fırat
- Gaziler
- Gevence
- Gökçeli
- Güder
- Gülkaya
- Gümüşgün
- Günaltı
- Gürbaşak
- Güzelköy
- Hafızpaşa
- Hancağız
- Hazımoğlu
- İkizce
- İntepe
- İstasyon
- İstiklal
- Kale
- Kamışlı
- Karaburç
- Karşıyaka
- Kayalar
- Keklik
- Kesiktaş
- Kıbrıs
- Kıraçgülü
- Kıratlı
- Kızılcakent
- Kızılin
- Kocatepe
- Korucak
- Köseler
- Kumla
- Kurucahüyük
- Mağaracık
- Mehmetobası
- Menderes
- Mercanlı
- Mevlana
- Mihrap
- Mimarsinan
- Nahırtepe
- Namıkkemal
- Özyurt
- Pazarcami
- Saha
- Şahinbey
- Salkım
- Samandöken
- Samanlı
- Saray
- Sarıkoç
- Sekili
- Şıhlar
- Söğütlü
- Suboyu
- Sultan Abdulhamit
- Tahtani
- Tanır
- Tatlıcak
- Tosunlu
- Toydemir
- Tuluktaş
- Turlu
- Turnalı
- Uluyatır
- Yağcılar
- Yağmuralan
- Yarımtepe
- Yeniyapan
- Yeniyazı
- Yeşilevler
- Yolçatı
- Yukarıbayındır
- Yukarıçardak
- Yunus Emre
- Zeytinlik

== Notable people ==
- Cahit Tanyol (1914–2020), Turkish sociologist
- Mehmet Ali Yaprak (1949–2004), Turkish businessman and drug trafficker
- Mustafa Cengiz (1949–2021), businessman who served as the president of sports club Galatasaray S.K.
- Mehmet Görmez (born 1959), former President of the Presidency of Religious Affairs and as such legally the highest level Islamic scholar in Turkey and the Turkish Republic of Northern Cyprus.
- Zihni Çakır (born 1969), journalist and author
- Ali Şahin (born 1970), Turkish politician who has been Deputy Minister of European Union Affairs since January 2016.
- Abdulhamit Gül (born 1977), Turkish politician

== Gallery ==
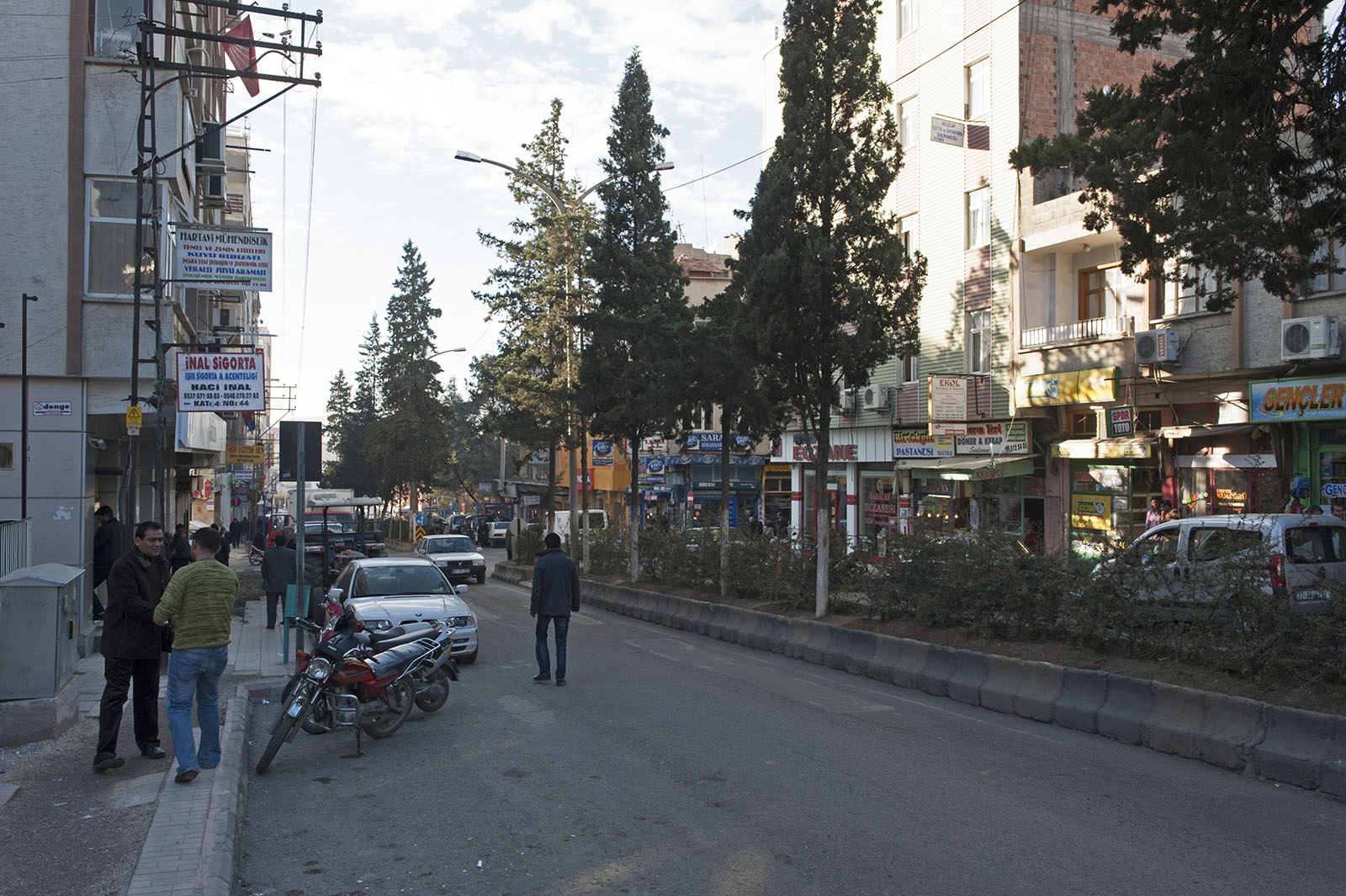
Nizip Town

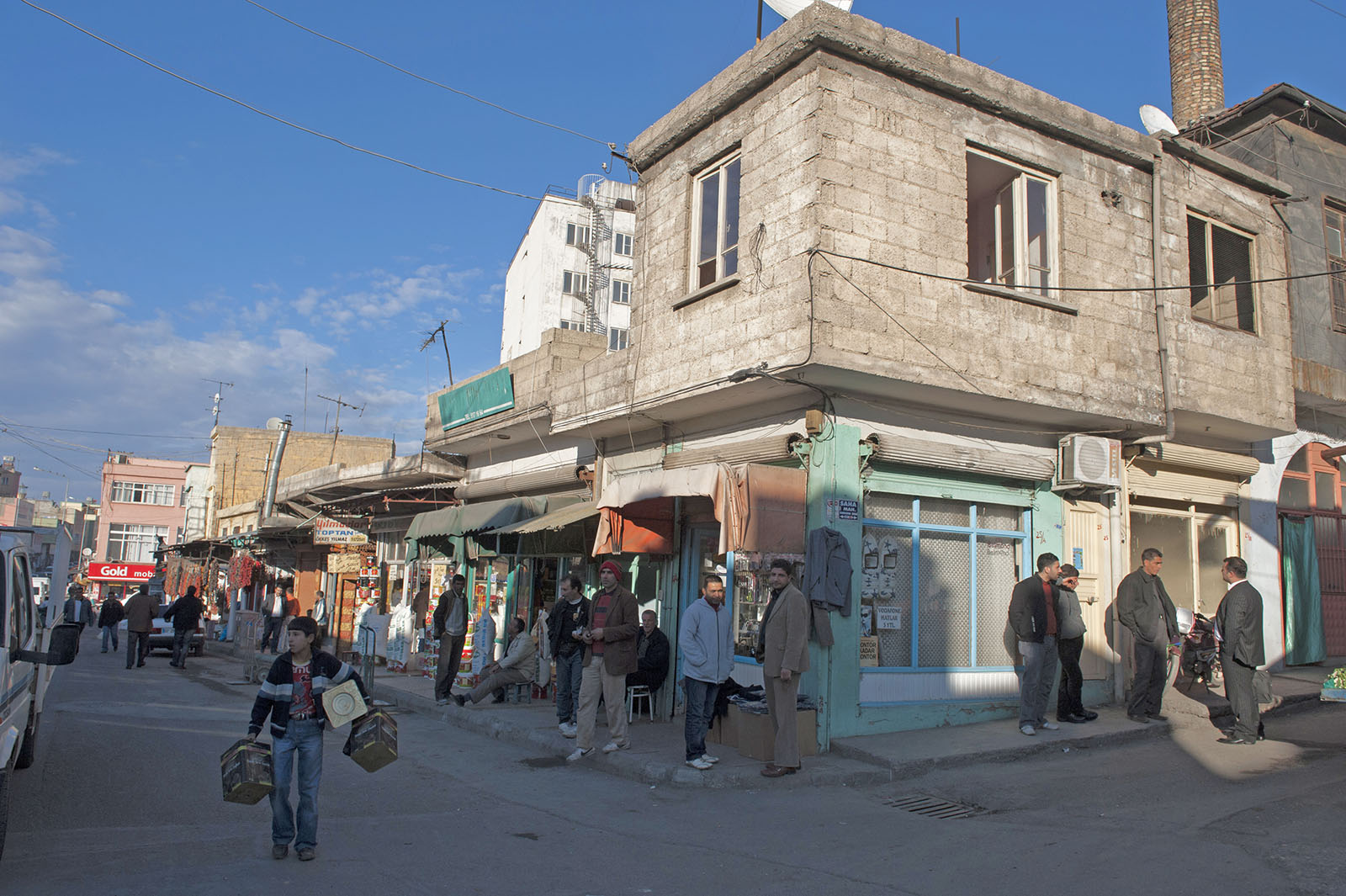
Nizip Town view

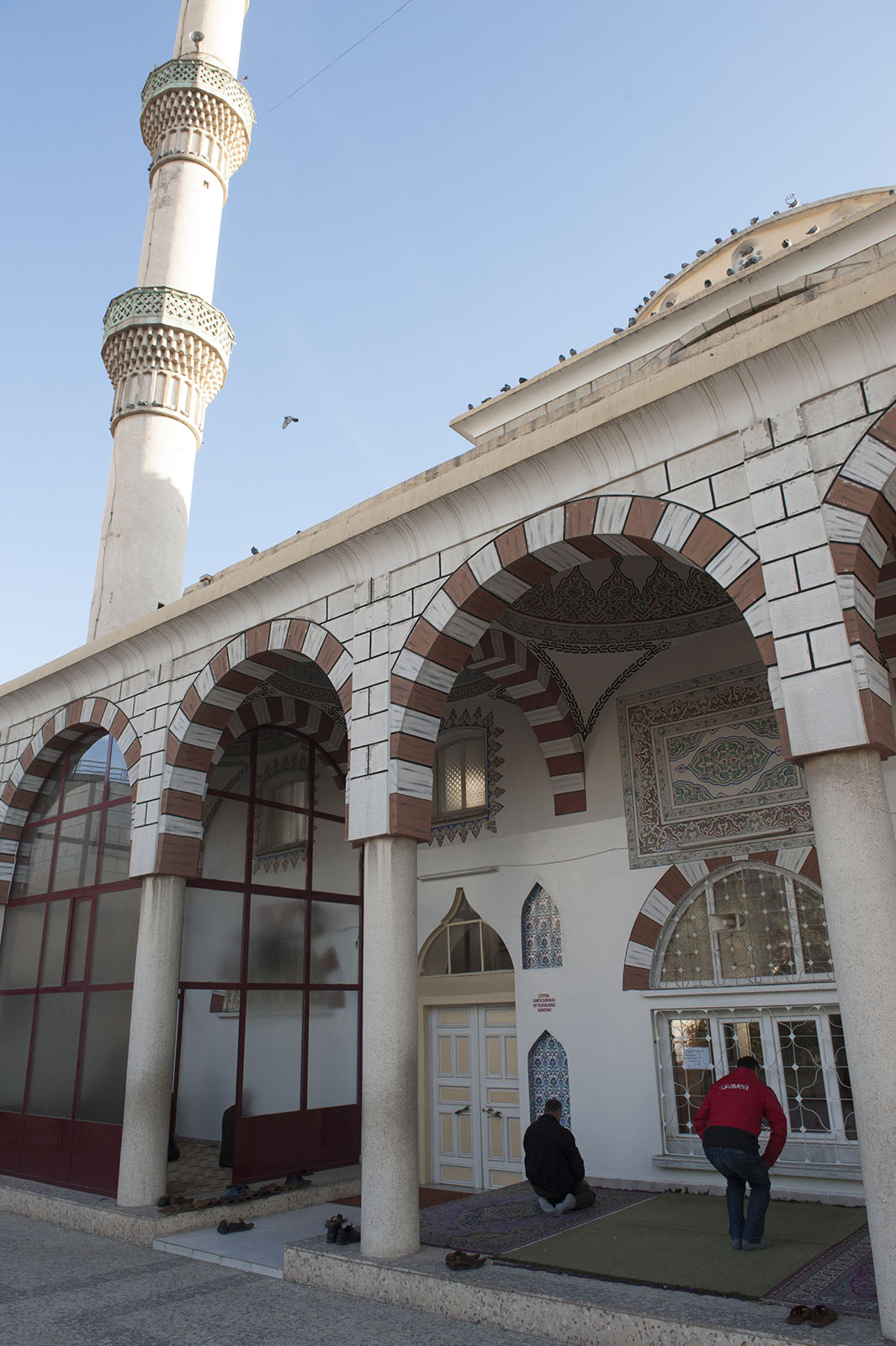
Nizip Mosque

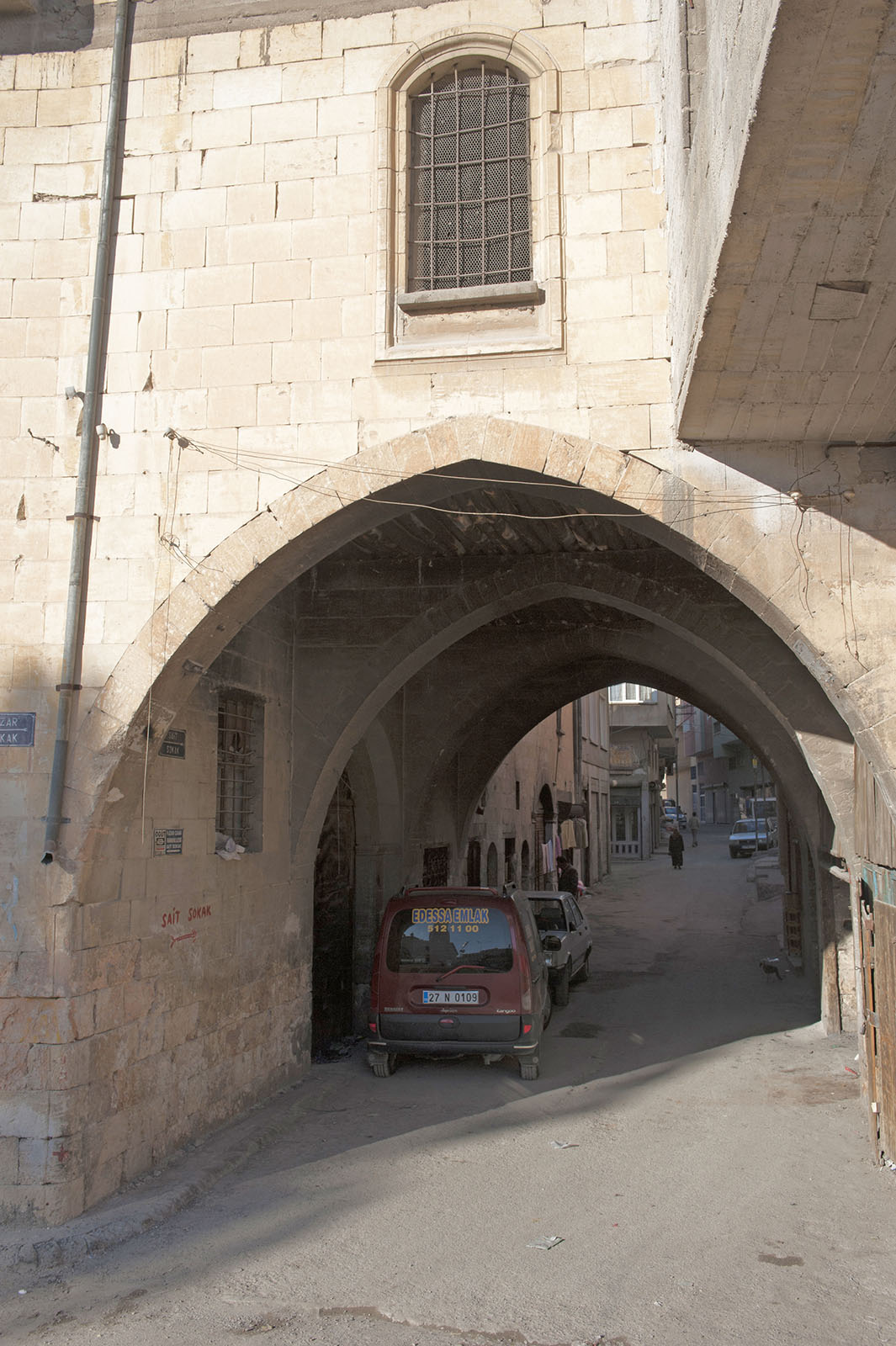
Nizip Arched road

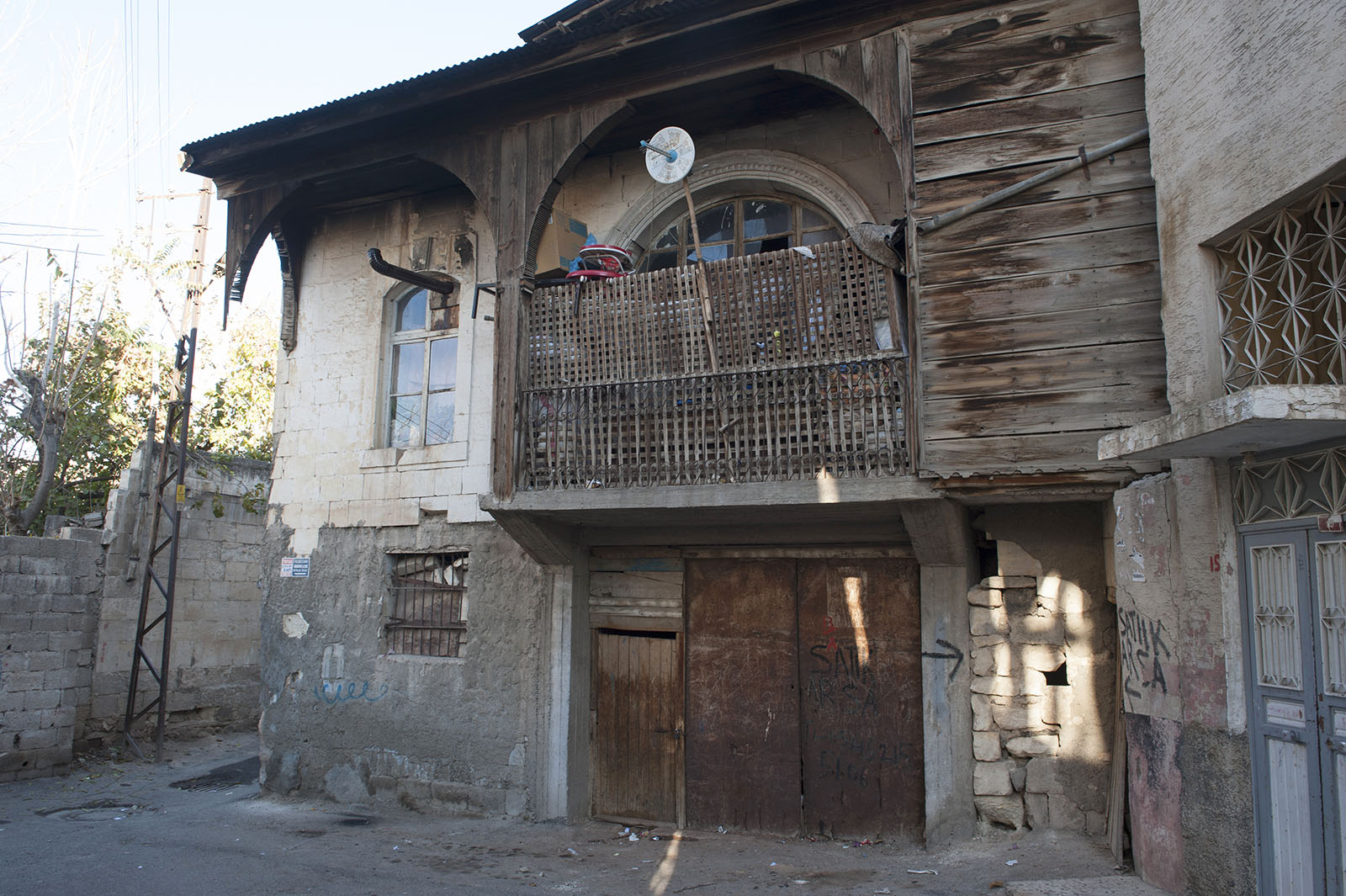
Nizip Architectural sight

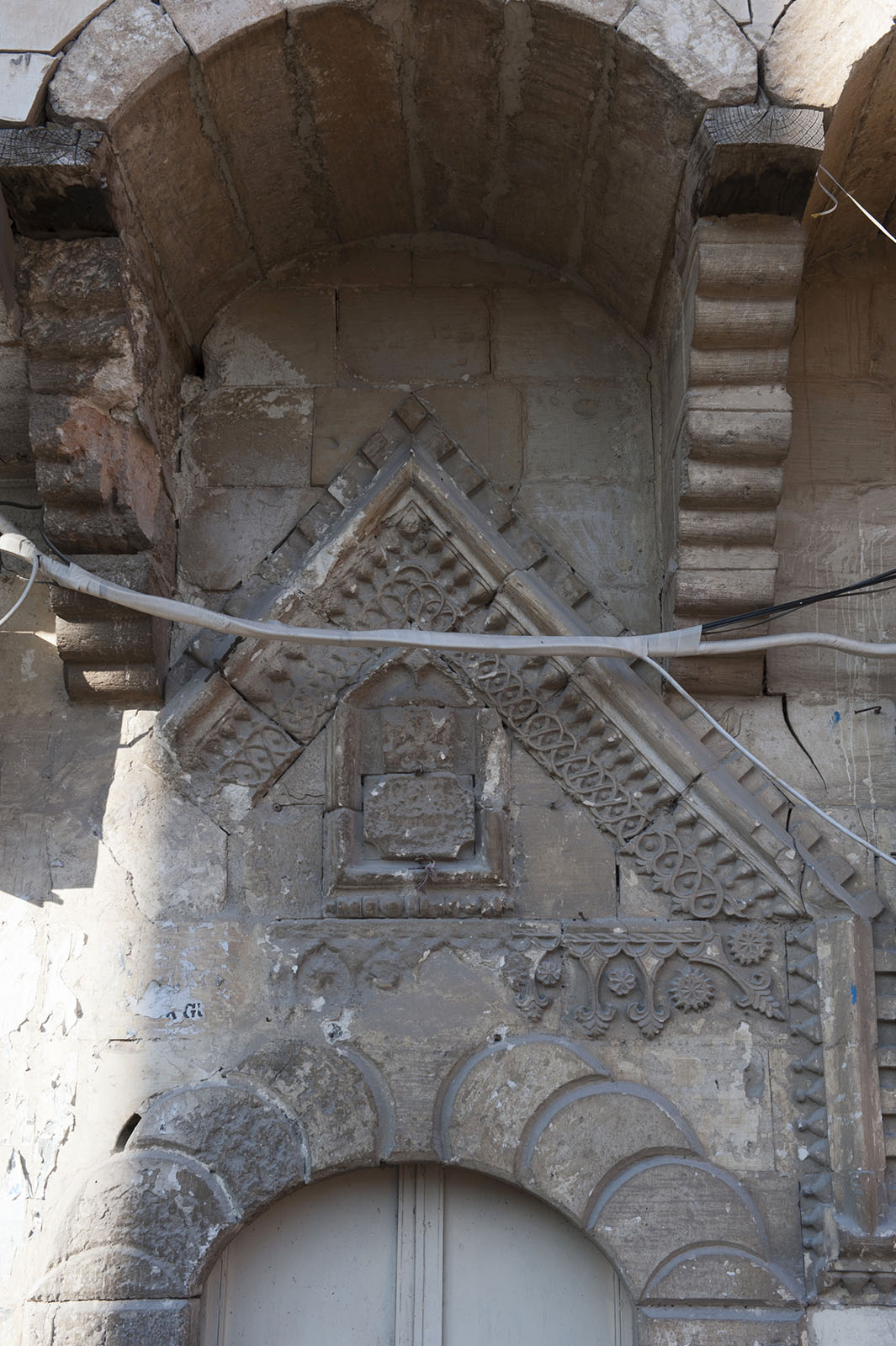
Nizip Architectural detail

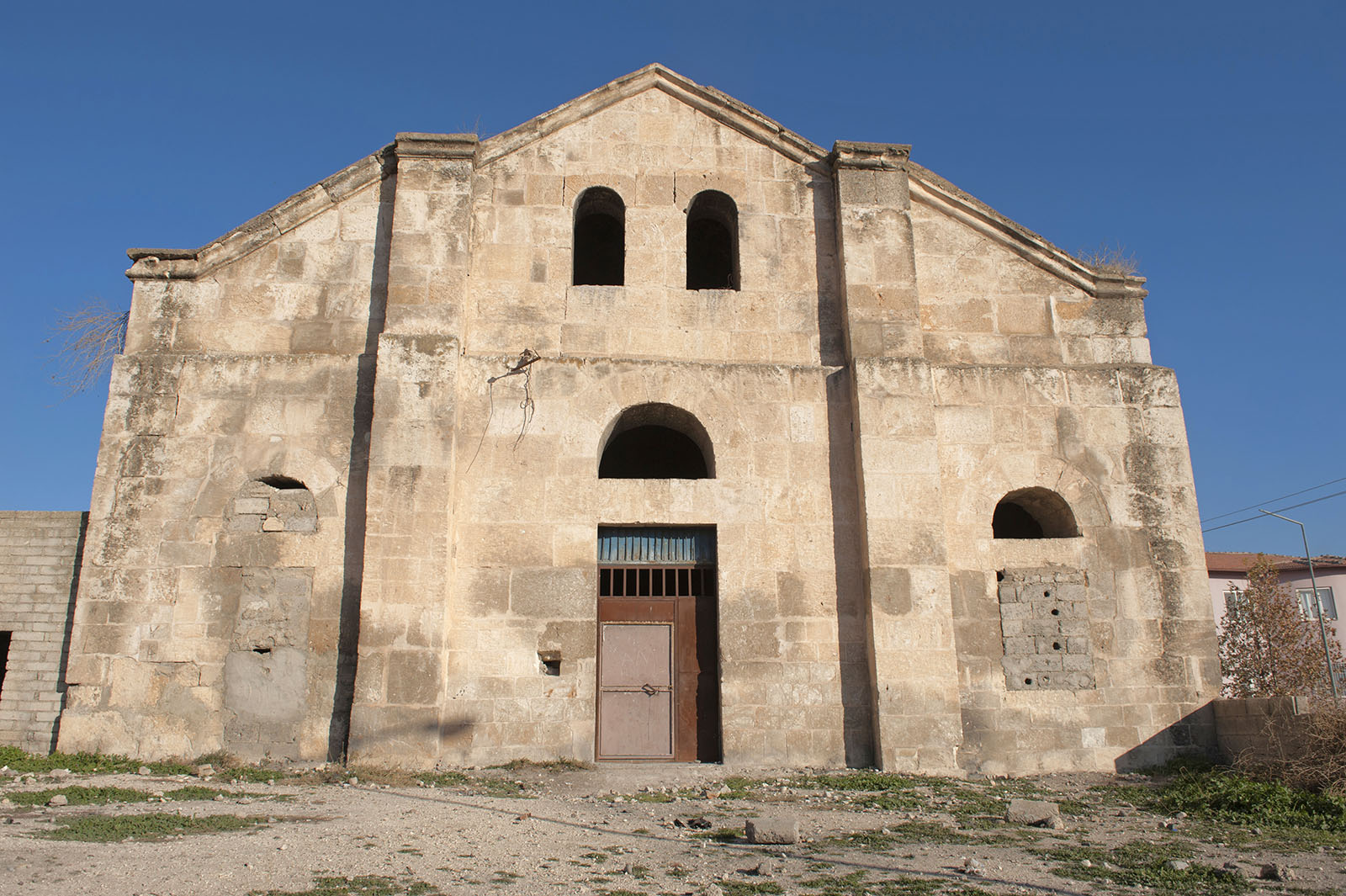
Nizip Fevkanı church

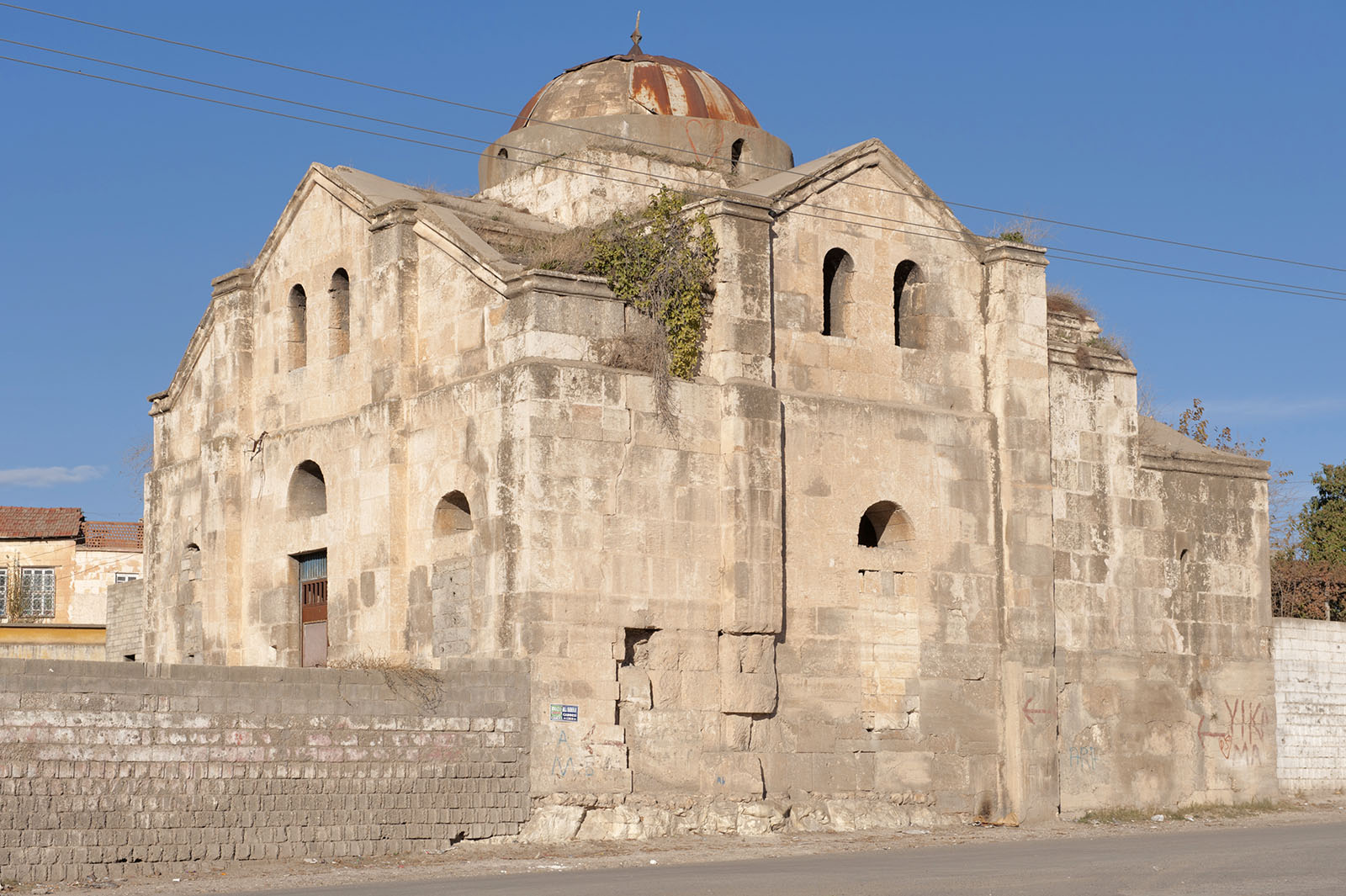
Nizip Fevkanı church

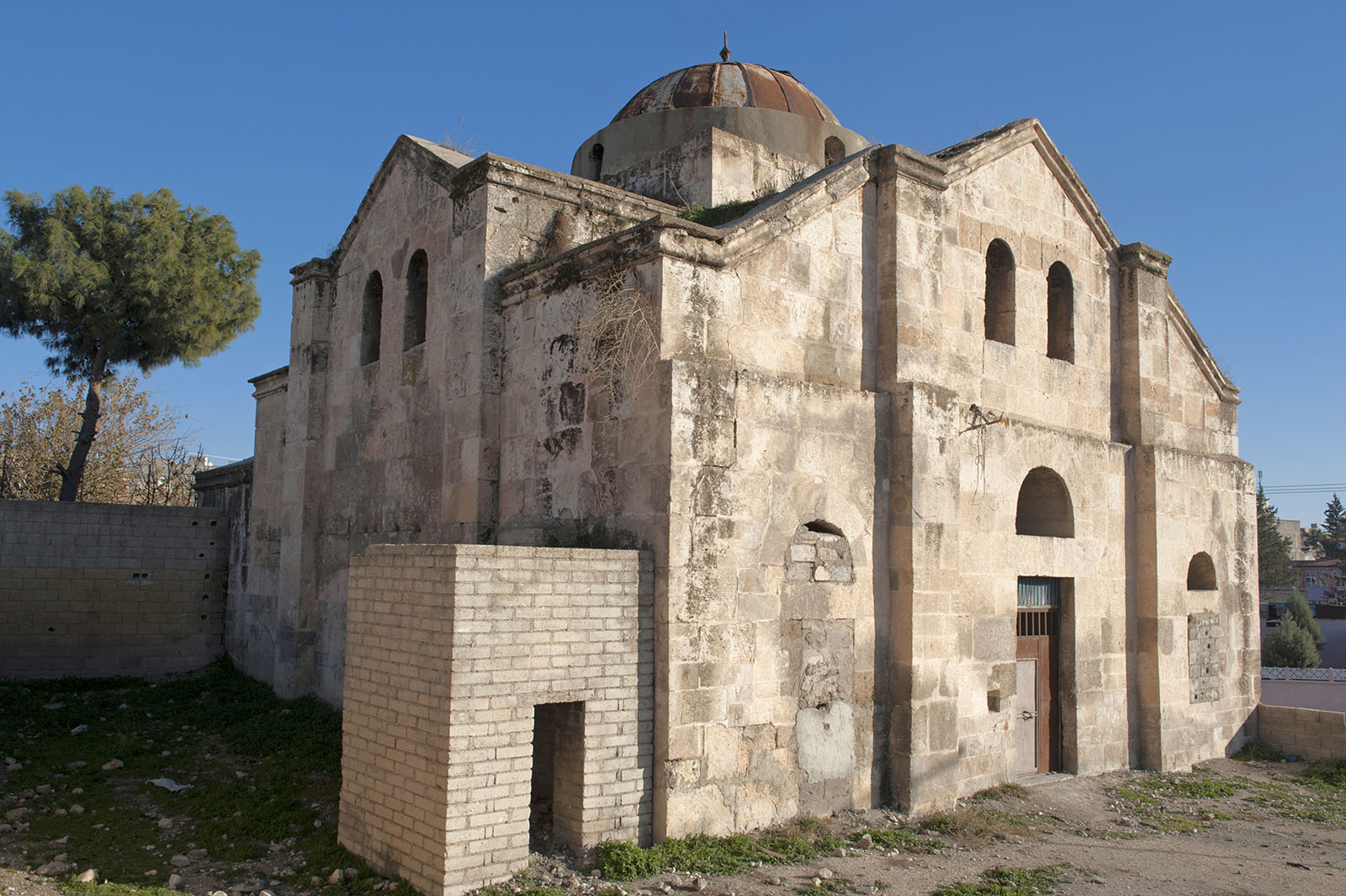
Nizip Fevkanı church

== See also ==
- Battle of Nizip
