= Barak (tribe) =

Turkmen tribe from Turkey and Syria

Barak Turkmens
Barak Türkmenleri
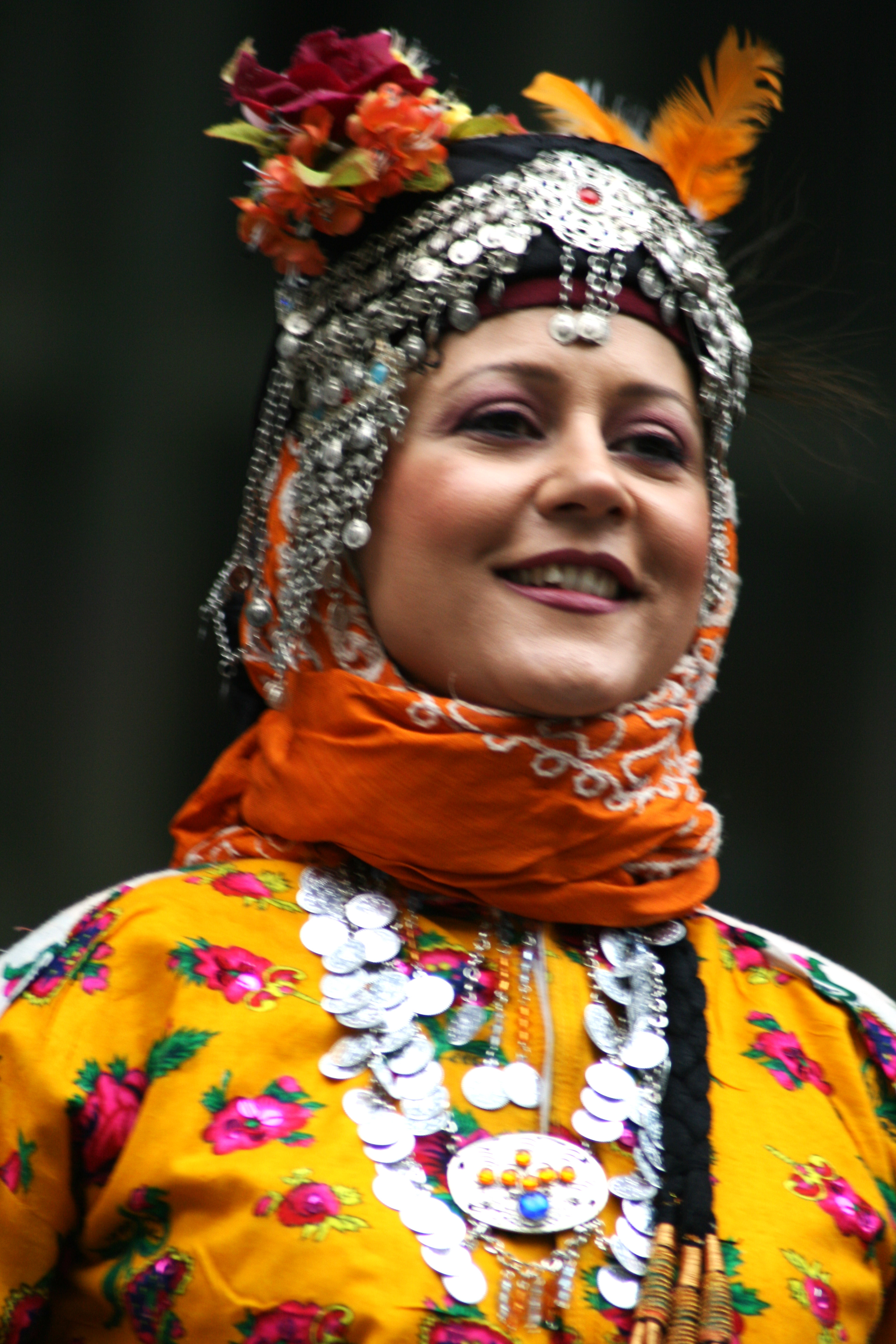
- A Barak Turkmen woman wearing a bridal costume

Regions with significant populations
- Turkey: Karkamış, Nizip, Oğuzeli; Syria: Jarabulus

Languages
- Turkish, Arabic (near Akçakale)

Religion
- Sunni Islam, historically Alevi and/or Shia Islam

Related ethnic groups
- Turkish people, Syrian Turkmen

Barak, commonly referred to as Barak Turkmens (Turkish: Barak Türkmenleri), is a Turkoman tribe that mainly originates in the Barak Plain (Turkish: Barak Ovası) in the southeastern portion of the province of Gaziantep in south-central Turkey.

== Etymology ==
The term Barak is popularly thought to mean some kind of a dog, regularly connoting an insult towards the tribe. According to the 19th-century Turkish-French dictionary compiled by the Ottoman-Armenian linguist Artin Hindoğlu, barak meant "dog", specifically barbet. According to Encyclopædia Iranica, it means "hairless dog" in Kipchak Turkic, while other sources conversely associate it with a "long-haired dog". In the old Turkic calendar, Barak was the name of the dog year. Itbarak or just Barak was a dog-headed manly creature mentioned in Oghuz Khagan Narratives. According to Sevan Nişanyan, "barak" means fast-running and raider.

The Baraks are homonymous with various other tribes and clans of Turkic peoples: A clan within the Adigine tribe of Kyrgyz, a clan of Nogais, and another within the Yomut tribe of Turkmens all bear the name Barak. Barak is also used as a male first name in various Turkic languages and oikonym in Turkey, Crimea, and Bulgaria. There is also one Cuman-Kipchak tribe named Barak.

== History ==
=== Migration to Central Anatolia ===
The tribe is believed to have been inhabiting Khorasan which they left around the years 1382–1383. According to the Baraks' dastan of origin, they were a part of the tribe of Uzun Hasan, and after his death, in the 17th century, Baraks chose Feriz Bey (also called Firuz or Fürüz Bey) as their leader. A Sunni himself, Feriz Bey converted Alevi Muslim Baraks to Sunni Islam. According to this narrative, it is believed that Baraks were in Khorasan, and 80 thousand Barak tents led by Feriz Bey and 4 thousand Abdal tents led by Ashik Dedemoğlu migrated to the vicinity of Yozgat in Anatolia.

=== Deportation to the Syrian Desert ===
After settling in Central Anatolia, the tribe started having problems with the settled locals and the Ottoman authorities: According to the first version of the story, nearby villages in Central Anatolia asked the Ottomans to remove the migrants from their lands. According to another version, the postal service of the Ottomans was robbed. Suspicious of the Baraks, the authorities arrested a tribesman. The elders of the tribe gathered and decided that the tribe should rebel in order to liberate the imprisoned member of the tribe. This prompted the Ottomans to exile the Barak Turkmens to the south of Akçakale, around River Julab, with the hopes that these rebellious Turkmens and local Arab tribes of Tayy and Mawali would eat themselves up. Later, Kadıoğlu Yusuf Pasha offered Barak Turkmens a pardon from the state in exchange of a regular tax of one sheep. The tribe accepted and gave 84 thousand sheep to the Ottoman-sided dedes, and after a long-lasting conflict, they also repelled the Arabs east and south of the area.

Frustrated that the state was manipulating the tribe, Feriz Bey proposed a return to the land of Ajam and Turkestan, with the unanimous support of the tribe's elders. Then, together with Ashik Dedemoğlu, he traveled to Iran to negotiate a migration with the Shah, who accepted the proposal. While Feriz Bey returned west to inform his tribe of the Shah's approval, Dedemoğlu and his Abdal followers stayed in Iran. Upon his arrival, Feriz Bey noticed that his tribe had become disorganized during his absence, and many refused to migrate back. Regardless, Feriz Bey gathered 40 thousand tents, roughly half of the tribe and migrated back to Iran, leaving the other half of the tribes (including his children and wife) behind, against their wish for him to stay.

=== Migration to the western side of the Euphrates ===
The Ottoman government was afraid that the remaining 40 thousand tents of Baraks were going to pose a problem for their authority over the region, as the tribe was storming the nearby settlements and the Tayy, Mawali, and Milan tribes. When one of the Turkmen leaders, Bediroğlu, went to Birecik for a certain matter, the mütesellim of the town killed him, which resulted in Baraks raiding Birecik and shredding the mütesellim into pieces. Mısırlı Abbas Pasha was then assigned to deal with the tribe. Following a meeting between Abbas Pasha and Feriz Bey's son, Mehmed Bey, groups of Baraks were resettled in the vicinity of Urfa and İzmir, and officials were assigned to tax the rest of the tribe that had recently started to farm and abandon their nomadic practices.

The Barak Plain at the time was generally occupied by nomadic Kurds of the Reşwan tribe and Bedouin Arabs of Mawali tribe. A Barak Turkmen family who were at odds with the rest of the tribe passed the river and visited the Reşwan leader, who welcomed them in his tent. While the Kurds appeared cordial at first, they did not allow the family to leave. Later, the tribal leader raped the wife, and the husband got his mouth and hands wrapped. Eventually, the husband opened up to his tribe. Barak Turkmens took this as an issue of honor and ignited a new blood feud on top of the ongoing clash with the Kurds east of the Euphrates.

Baraks planned another uprising against the state. Burning their crops, they threw 80 Ottoman officials into the fire. They passed the river with their camels and herds, starting a bloody battle with the Reşwan tribe, which fled the region and settled in the Armenian and Chepni-inhabited regions to the north of Nizip. This last migration marked the tribe's full adaptation to a settled life, as fertile plateaus that were more suitable for grazing were left in the eastern side of the river. In 1835, Francis Rawdon Chesney mentioned that the land extending from Sajur River to Birecik was being cultivated by Turkomans of the Barak tribe, which shows that Baraks were either settled or semi-nomadic by early 19th century. In 1855, Carl Ritter mentioned that northwards from Sajur River lived settled Turkomans of the Barak tribe. Still, 70-80 tents of nomad Baraks went further west and spread around Gaziantep, later merging with Yörüks in the region, while staying in touch with the settled Baraks.

== Religion ==
Most Barak Turkmens are Sunni Muslim; however, Baraks used to deviate from the religious practices of many Sunni Turks. In Barak Turkmen villages, mosques used to be uncommon to find, although they held importance for Sunni communities as places of gathering. Many old Barak tribesmen claim that they weren't Sunni but Shiite in the past and became so through close contact with the Sunni Arab tribes. The Barak community used to have spiritually influential members called "dede," who were divided into two types: "Barak Dede" (sometimes called Barak Baba) and "Bozgeyikli Dede." According to traditional narrative, the region that Barak Turkmens inhabited was granted as a reward to Barak Dede, who played an important role in the Baghdad campaign, and his dervishes. The location of these dedes were not known, and they would mysteriously appear in times of the traditional sacrifice. Still, they were accepted as Barak Turkmens. Meanwhile, Bozgeyikli Dedes weren't a part of Barak Turkmens but another Turkmen group and used to stay in a village north of Elbistan. By tradition, every Barak Turkmen household used to regularly donate sheep and goats for Qurban to these two dedes. Gradually, the religious powers of these figures decreased, and for tradition's sake and without much religious reasoning, these people started to give dedes cereals like barley and wheat during harvest instead of animals.

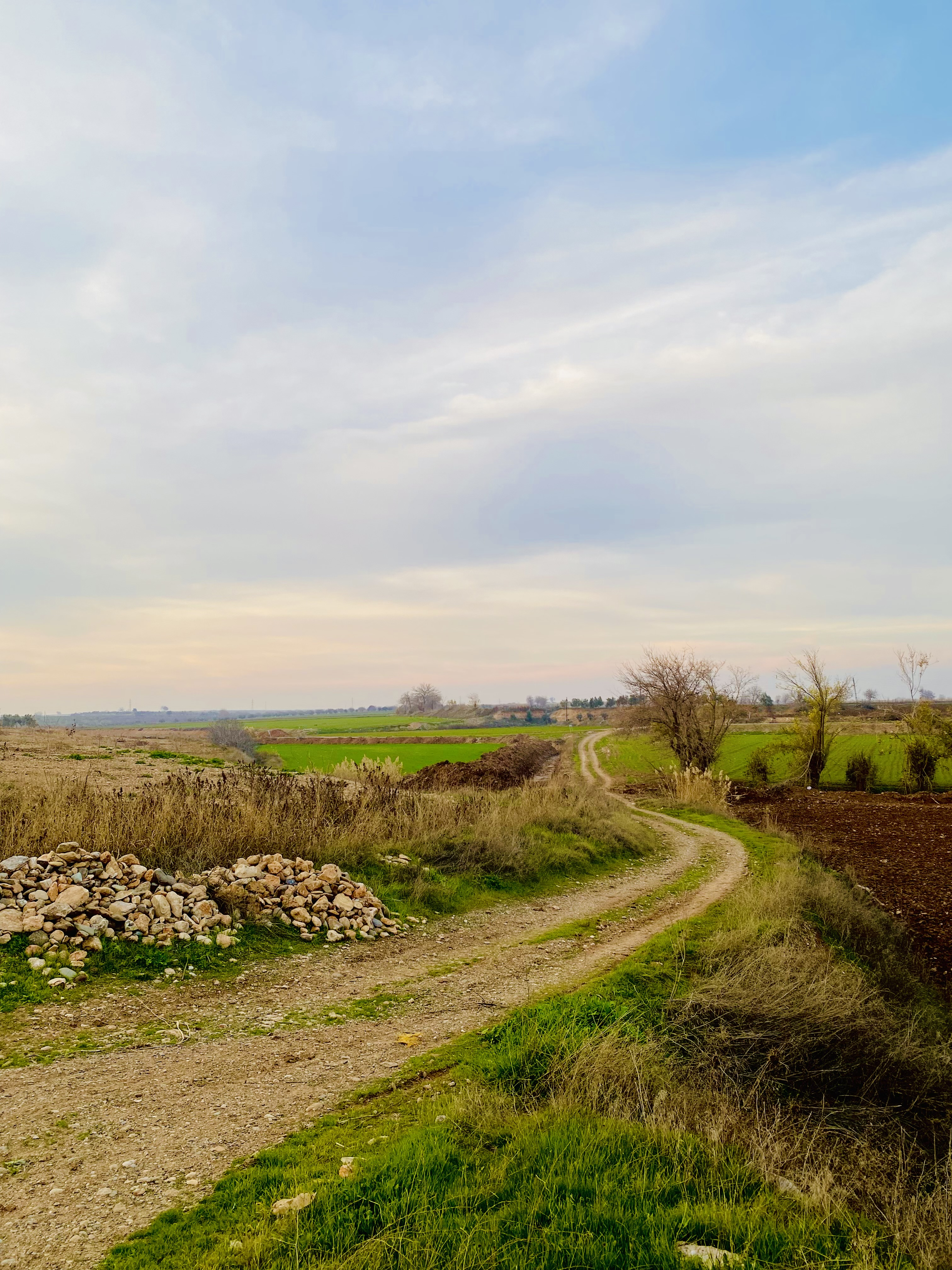
A view of the Barak Plain

== Settlements ==
The region that Barak Turkmens inhabit is called the Barak Plain, which is also known as Northern Manbij or Tell Basher Plain (Turkish: Tilbaşar Ovası). The Barak Plain covers three districts of the province of Gaziantep: Karkamış, Nizip, and Oğuzeli. Barak Turkmens populate at least 45 villages in Nizip district, further 18 villages in Oğuzeli district, and all of Karkamış district including the main town. They share some of the villages with other tribes including the Abdals. There are also Barak settlements in Kilis Province, İzmir Province, Niğde Province and Nevşehir Province. Baraks inhabit several more villages in the Jarabulus Subdistrict of northern Syria. There are a few Arabic-speaking Baraks near Akçakale.

== Culture ==
=== Clothes ===
Barak Turkmen women traditionally wear üç etek with a belt. An orange headscarf known as "Ahmediye" worn by women as a part of their traditional folk costume is an iconic piece that has become a symbol of the Baraks. This often features roses and feathers known as "tozak." On some occasions, a fez with coins is worn over Ahmediye. Men wear aba with regional patterns and shalwar with a keffiyeh wrapped around the waist. A white keffiyeh may be worn on the head.

=== Cuisine ===
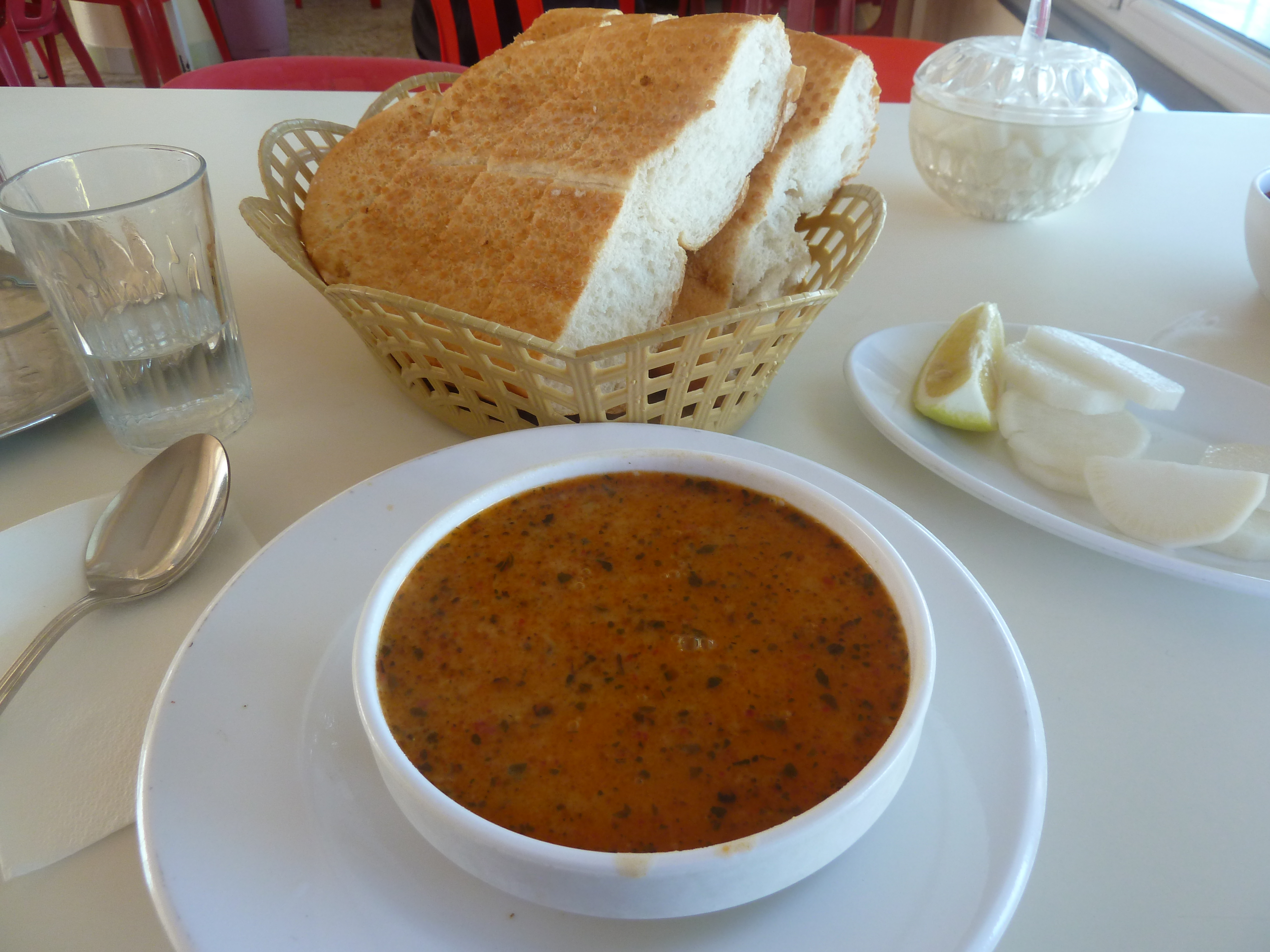
Ezogelin soup, bread, and tea near Gaziantep, Türkiye.

Ezogelin soup is a popular dish from the national cuisine of Turkey that was borrowed from the Barak Turkmens. It is named after the story of Ezo Gelin (also known as Özo or Ezov Gelin), a Barak Turkmen who lived in the early 20th century.

=== Music ===
Instruments used in Barak traditional music include saz, zurna, davul, and zambır.

Barak Uzun Hava is the most famous type of music that originates from the Baraks.

=== Folk dances ===
Most folk dances of the Baraks involve holding hands and are accompanied by davul, zurna, and zambır. Therefore, they were categorized as "halays," although this name isn't frequently used among this population. Most halays of the Baraks are often slow. Like most halays, there is often a leader (known as "baş çeken" or "baş seken" in the local dialect). It is often claimed that most dances of Baraks include symbols alluding to their forced migration from Central Anatolia. Some halays danced by the Baraks are listed below:

- Hasan Dağı:

Its name refers to a mountain in Central Anatolia.

- Düz-Şirvani or Reşi Düzü:

This dance was borrowed from the Reshwan Kurds living north of Nizip.

- Gaba
- Demircioğlu or Garip Halayı:

This dance involves the poems of Ashiq Qarib.

- Demirci
- Dokuzlu
- Şekeroğlan
- Kuseyri:

Its name means from Kuseyr, the old name of the Altınözü district of Hatay Province.

- Halebi
- Pekmez
- Üç Ayak
- Sinsin

Some dances like Çibikli involve clapping hands.

Baraks also dance their own versions of Karşılama with handkerchiefs in both hands.

=== Traditions ===
Barak Turkmens used to practice berdel marriages, and they call it değişik in their local dialect of Turkish.

== Sub-tribes ==
Baraks are made up of many sub-tribes, also composed of constituent tribes, which also consist of sub-tribes. The hierarchy changes from source to source.

=== Abdürrezaklı ===
Their settlements are mostly near bodies of water, stretching from the Euphrates coast to Sajur River, and a significant portion of this tribe is in Syria. They are made up of the following tribes:

- Kasımlı
- Mahmutlu
- Tiryakili
- Taburlu
- Çayrazlı
- Ali Dirizli

=== Kürdülü ===
This tribe was named after the leader Kürdili Kerim, whose mother was Kurdish and father a Turkmen. It is made up of the following tribes:

- Boz Muratlı
- Kızılca Şarlı
- Bayındırlı: Named after the leader Bayındır Halid, the half-brother of Kürdili Kerim (from the same father but different mothers).
- Geçili
- Sürkızıllı
- Karabacak
- Mazyalı

=== Torun ===
Not be confused with other homonymous groups, such as the Torun sub-tribe of the Afshars. It is made up of the following tribes:

- Taburlu
- İnaluşağı
- Haliduşağı
- Osmanuşağı
- Hacıuşağı
- Muharremli

=== İsalı ===
This tribe is also known as Eseli. It is made up of the following tribes:

- Karakozak
  - Höcüklü
  - Arapkıran
  - Şabanlı
  - Çömezli
  - Baburlu
  - Çakırlı
  - Ceceli
- Adıklı
- Birelli
  - Zeynelli
  - Emirli (or Emiruşağı): This tribe also inhabits Kayseri.
  - Kara Hasanlı
  - Harmandal
  - Mahmutlu
- İsalı
- Kıyanlı
- Karamanuşağı

=== Unrelated neighboring tribes ===
Tribes of non-Turkic origin that live among the Baraks who practice Barak culture include Kurdish tribes such as Bijan, and Arab tribes such as Mawali, Albaajuz, and Damalkha tribes.

== In popular culture ==
The Barak story of Ezo Gelin was turned to a movie for three times: in 1955, 1968, and 1973.

== Notable people of full or partial Barak origin ==
- Ali Şahin (born 2 January 1970), Turkish politician, Deputy Minister of European Affairs, Justice and Development Party Member of Parliament for Gaziantep
- Yusuf Öztürkmen (1 January 1936 – 18 November 2006), Turkish politician and lawyer, former Republican People's Party Member of Parliament for Gaziantep
- Cevdet San (1908 – 12 August 1993), Turkish politician, former Democrat Party Member of Parliament for Gaziantep

== See also ==
- Elbegli, neighboring Turkmen tribe

== Bibliography ==
- Tanyol, Cahit (1952). "Baraklarda Örf ve Adet Araştırmaları 1". İstanbul University Journal of Sociology (in Turkish). 2 (7): 71–108.
