= Mersin–Adana–Gaziantep railway =

Higher-speed railway line under construction

Mersin–Adana–Gaziantep high-speed railway

Overview
- Native name: Mersin–Adana–Gaziantep yüksek hızlı demiryolu
- Status: Under construction
- Locale: Southern Turkey
- Termini: Mersin station, Mersin; Gaziantep station, Gaziantep
- Website: MAG

Service
- Type: higher-speed rail, high-speed rail
- System: Turkish State Railways

History
- Commenced: 2014
- Planned opening: 2027

Technical
- Track gauge: 1,435 mm (4 ft 8 1/2 in) standard gauge
- Electrification: 25 kV AC, 15 Hz
- Operating speed: 160–200 km/h (99–124 mph)
- Signalling: ETCS L1

The Mersin–Adana–Gaziantep high-speed railway (Turkish: Mersin–Adana–Gaziantep yüksek hızlı demiryolu), known officially as the Mersin–Adana–Gaziantep higher-speed railway (Turkish: Mersin–Adana–Gaziantep yüksek standartlı demiryolu) and abbreviated as MAG, is a 303 km (188 mi) long high-speed/higher-speed railway corridor currently under construction in southern Turkey. Beginning at Mersin, on the Mediterranean Sea, the railway corridor stretches inland to Gaziantep, via Yenice, Adana and Osmaniye. The scope of the project includes the upgrading of three existing railway lines, the construction of a new railway tunnel bypass, and the construction of a new, direct rail-link to Gaziantep.

== Background ==
The entire MAG railway stretches across a populated and economically significant region of Turkey. The combined population of the four main provinces the railway runs through (Mersin, Adana, Osmaniye and Gaziantep) is just over 6.8 million and has a total combined GDP of $23.6 million, about 6.3% of Turkey's GDP. The Port of Mersin, on the Mediterranean Sea, is the sixth-largest seaport in terms of total freight handling and third-largest in terms of container freight handling. The existing railway is a major freight rail corridor, connecting to three major railways at Yenice, Toprakkle and Fevzipaşa. Iron-ore, liquid fuel and container freight makes up the bulk of freight trains using the railway. The Port of İskenderun as well as the İsdemir steel plant in Hatay are accessed through Toprakkale while via Yenice, the Konya-Yenice railway connects to major cities like Konya, Kayseri, Ankara and further to Istanbul and is the only rail connection through the Taurus Mountains. On the eastern side of the railway corridor, the 105 year-old Ayran Tunnel is the only crossing of the Nur Mountains and is a major route connecting Turkey's interior mines to its Mediterranean ports.

In terms of passenger rail, the Mersin-Adana railway is by far the busiest in the region with around 29 daily round-trips between Mersin and Adana at around 45-minute intervals. Passenger train traffic east of Adana is considerably less but still provides a rail link via regional and intercity trains. The single-track railway hampers capacity as freight trains have a larger priority along the route.

Other high/higher-speed railways are being built simultaneously with the MAG railway. The 242 km (150 mi) long section of the Konya-Yenice railway is being upgraded to higher-speed rail standards: the 135 km (84 mi) section from Karaman to Ulukışla is currently under construction, with the remaining 107 km (66 mi) long section through the Taurus mountains, from Ulukışla to Yenice is in the planning phase. In European Turkey, the Istanbul-Kapıkule railway is also under construction, with the first part from Kapıkule to Çerkezköy scheduled to open in 2024. Istanbul and Karaman have already been connected with high-speed rail since early 2022 and when the remaining routes are finished, TCDD Taşımacılık will provide direct YHT service from Edirne to Gaziantep, a distance of 1,065 km (662 mi).

== Project ==
The following projects are either under construction or have been completed, as part of the MAG railway corridor:

Line	Section	Tracks	Length		Top speed	Status	Project
Line	Section	Tracks	km	mi	Top speed	Status	Project
Mersin–Adana railway	Mersin–Adana	4	78	48	200 km/h (120 mph)	Under construction	Adding 3rd and 4th tracks to the existing double-track railway; constructing a 19 km (12 mi) branch line to Çukurova Airport.
Adana–Aleppo railway	Adana–Bahçe	2	137	85	200 km/h (120 mph)	Under construction	Adding second-track to existing single-track railway; upgrading track geometry to accommodate higher speeds.
Fevzipaşa bypass	Bahçe–Nurdağı	2	17	11	120 km/h (75 mph)	Under construction	Constructing a new bypass through the Nur Mountains, via the 9.95 km (6.18 mi) long Nurdağı Tunnel.
Nurdağı–Başpınar railway	Nurdağı–Başpınar	2	56	35	200 km/h (120 mph)	Under construction	Constructing a new, direct, double-track railway between Nurdağı and Başpınar.
Narlı–Karkamış railway	Başpınar–Gaziantep	4	16	9.9	120 km/h (75 mph)	Completed	Expanding the single-track railway through Gaziantep to a quadruple-track railway; Rebuilding existing stations; Constructing new stations for a new commuter rail service.

=== Right of way ===
The existing railways were constructed between 1886 and 1953. The Mersin-Tarsus-Adana Railway constructed the oldest part of the route, building the line between Mersin and Adana between 1885 and 1886. The Baghdad Railway bought the MTA Railway in 1906 and expanded the railway further east to Aleppo, between 1908 and 1912 and further to Nusaybin by 1918. The passage through the Nur Mountains wasn't completed until 1917, due to the construction of the Ayran Tunnel. Following World War I and its subsequent peace treaties, the railway within Turkey was nationalized. However, the new Turkish/Syria border created a 166 km (103 mi) gap in the line, in which the railway passed through northern Syria. In 1927, the Turkish State Railways began constructing a railway to Diyarbakır, branching off of the Adana-Aleppo railway at Fevzipaşa, but it wasn't until 1953 when a branch to Gaziantep was built.

The Turkish government greatly neglected its railways from the 1950s onward and the route, which was designed to accommodate steam locomotives, was never upgraded or improved in any significant way, apart from the section between Mersin and Adana which was double-tracked in the 1990s. The MAG Railway project will expand the right of way in certain areas and increase the radius on certain curves. The biggest change to the existing right-of-way of is between Mamure and Bahçe, where the railway will take a slightly northern route while climbing up to the Bahçe pass. Apart from this section, since most of the existing railway passes through a relatively flat landscape, no other significant changes to the route are in the works.

Within Gaziantep, a new 3,640 m (11,940 ft) long cut-and-cover tunnel was built west of Gaziantep station, bringing the railway underground.

=== Electrification ===
The 63 km (39 mi) long section between Toprakkale and Fevzipaşa was electrified with 25 kV AC overhead wire in 1994. This was done as part of the wider electrification from Divriği to İskenderun, an important iron-ore route in Turkey. Electrification was extended west from Toprakkale to Adana in 2016 and to Yenice in 2017. The MAG railway will electrify the remaining 43 km (27 mi) between Yenice and Mersin, as well as the 25 km (16 mi) long stretch of track in Gaziantep, which opened in November 2022.

=== New railways ===
The MAG railway project includes the construction of 73 km (45 mi) of new railways. The first new line is the Fevzipaşa bypass, which includes the 9,950 m (32,640 ft) long Nurdağı Tunnel. This will branch off of the Adana-Aleppo railway east of Bahçe station. Instead of climbing up further, the bypass will enter the tunnel at about 117 m (384 ft) lower than the existing Ayran Tunnel. After exiting the tunnel within the Sağlık Plain, the bypass will continue for 3 km (1.9 mi) until joining the Fevzipaşa-Kurtalan railway at Nurdağı. Just north of Nurdağı station, the Nurdağı-Başpınar railway will branch off with a more direct route to Gaziantep, through the Sof Mountains. This new railway will shorten the route to Gaziantep by 96 km (60 mi).

A new 19 km (12 mi) long branch line from Yenice to the new Çukurova Airport will also be constructed. This will provide direct rail service from Mersin and Adana to the new airport.
