= Nurdağı–Başpınar railway =

Proposed railway line in Turkey

Nurdağı-Başpınar railway

Overview
- Native name: Nurdağı-Başpınar demiryolu
- Status: Under construction
- Locale: Aintab plateau
- Termini: Nurdağı, Gaziantep province; Başpınar, Gaziantep province
- Stations: 2

Service
- Type: Heavy rail
- System: Turkish State Railways

History
- Commenced: 2 May 2017
- Planned opening: 2025

Technical
- Line length: 56 km (35 mi)
- Number of tracks: Double track
- Track gauge: 1,435 mm (4 ft 8 1/2 in) standard gauge
- Electrification: 25 kV, 15 Hz
- Operating speed: 200 km (120 mi) (Max.)
- Signalling: ETCS

The Nurdağı-Başpınar railway (Turkish: Nurdağı-Başpınar demiryolu) is a 56 km (35 mi) long electrified high-speed railway under construction in southern Turkey. Branching off the Fevzipaşa-Kurtalan railway at Nurdağı, the railway will connect to the Narlı-Karkamış railway at Başpınar, a northern suburb of Gaziantep. The railway is part of the larger Mersin-Adana-Gaziantep high-speed railway project, in which the existing Mersin-Adana and Adana-Bahçe railways are being upgraded to accommodate speeds between 160 km/h (99 mph) and 200 km/h (120 mph), along with the 17 km (11 mi) long Fevzipaşa bypass. When completed, the railway will accommodate mostly high-speed trains but also conventional passenger and freight trains and is classified as a high-standard railway (Turkish: Yüksek standartlı demiryolu).

== Route ==
The existing 152 km (94 mi) long railway link between Nurdağı and Gaziantep was constructed between 1935 and 1953. Due to the policy shift for transportation in Turkey during the 1950s, the route was never upgraded to modern standards and follows a winding path that goes around the Sof Mountains, via Narlı, with an average transit time of around 2 hours and 30 minutes. The Nurdağı-Başpınar railway will greatly shorten the route down to 56 km (35 mi) with a direct route through the Sof Mountains and track geometry to accommodate high-speeds.

The western end of the railway begins just north Nurdağı station, where it branches east and roughly parallels the O-52 highway while crossing the Sağlık plain, until heading into the Sof Mountains, just south of the village of Şatırhüyük. The railway then traverses the Sof Mountains via four tunnels, the longest of them being over 7,000 m (23,000 ft) until reaching the existing railway just north of Gaziantep. The section after Başpınar, to central Gaziantep, was rebuilt and expanded to four-tracks between 2016 and 2022. Trains using the Nurdağı-Başpınar railway will then use the two south express tracks within Gaziantep, allowing segregation from slower commuter trains.
