= Ayran Tunnel (railway) =

Railway tunnel in Turkey

Overview
- Other name: Amanus Tunnel
- Line: Adana–Aleppo railway
- Location: Between Bahçe and Fevzipaşa, Turkey
- Status: Operating
- System: Turkish State Railways
- Crosses: Nur Mountains, near the Bahçe Pass

Operation
- Work began: 1908
- Opened: 1917
- Owner: Turkish State Railways
- Operator: TCDD Taşımacılık; Körfez Ulaştırma; Omsan

Technical
- Design engineer: Heinrich August Meissner
- Length: 4,905 m (16,093 ft)
- No. of tracks: 1
- Track gauge: 1,435 mm (4 ft 8 1/2 in)
- Electrified: 25 kV AC, 15 Hz
- Operating speed: 40 km/h (25 mph)

The Ayran Tunnel (Turkish: Ayran Tüneli), also known as the Amanus Tunnel (Turkish: Amanus Tüneli) or Bahçe Tunnel (Turkish: Bahçe Tüneli), is a 4,905 m (16,093 ft) long railway tunnel in southern Turkey. It carries the Adana-Aleppo railway through the Nur Mountains, at the eastern end of the Amanian Gate. Built by the Baghdad Railway between 1908 and 1917, the tunnel is currently owned by the Turkish State Railways. The tunnel begins just east of Bahçe and ends just north of Fevzipaşa.

Because the original alignment of the railway head south to Aleppo, all trains heading to eastern Turkey must reverse at Fevzipaşa. Due to the steep geography of the junction, no wyes or loops can be constructed, resulting in a bottle-neck along Turkey's busiest freight corridor. To circumvent this problem, a new tunnel is under construction. While the Ayran Tunnel heads south from Bahçe, the Nurdağ Tunnel will head east and connect directly to the Fevzipaşa-Kurtalan railway.
