= Nurdağı Tunnel =

Railway tunnel in Turkey

Overview
- Other name: Fevzipaşa bypass
- Line: Mersin-Gaziantep railway
- Location: Between Bahçe and Nurdağı, Turkey
- Status: Under construction
- System: Turkish State Railways
- Crosses: Nur Mountains, near the Bahçe pass

Operation
- Work began: 2014
- Opened: 2024 (Scheduled)
- Owner: Turkish State Railways
- Character: Mountain tunnel

Technical
- Length: 9,950 m (32,640 ft)
- No. of tracks: 2
- Track gauge: 1,435 mm (4 ft 8 1/2 in)
- Electrified: 25 kV, 50 Hz
- Operating speed: 120 km/h (75 mph)

The Nurdağı Tunnel (Turkish: Nurdağı Tüneli) is a 9,950 m (32,640 ft) long twin-tube railway tunnel, currently under construction in southern Turkey. Passing through the Nur Mountains, near the east end of the Amanian Gate, it will carry passenger and freight trains along with high-speed trains, as part of the Mersin-Adana-Gaziantep high-speed railway. Upon completion, it will become the longest railway tunnel in Turkey, surpassing the 5,473 m (17,956 ft) long Deliktaş Tunnel in Sivas.

The Nurdağı Tunnel will also relive a cumbersome bottleneck caused by the original alignment of the Baghdad Railway. Trains passing through the Nur Mountains use the Ayran Tunnel to Fevzipaşa, where the junction with the Fevzipaşa-Kurtalan railway is. However the alignment of the tracks only allows access from the south; meaning trains must stop at Fevzipaşa and the locomotive must reverse directions before continuing north through the junction. Since the construction of a wye or loop is not possible, due to the steep terrain, the maneuvers at Fevzipaşa greatly hamper transit times on Turkey's busiest freight corridor. The Nurdağı Tunnel will bypass Fevzipaşa altogether, with a direct route from Bahçe, on the Adana-Aleppo railway, to Nurdağı, on the Fevzipaşa-Kurtalan railway. Due to this bypass, the tunnel has also been named the Fevzipaşa bypass (Turkish: Fevzipaşa varyantı). The entire length of the bypass (including the tunnel) is about 17 km (11 mi).
