= İbrahimli (disambiguation) =

İbrahimli is a surname.

İbrahimli may also refer to:

- İbrahimli, Mut, a small village in Mut district of Mersin Province, Turkey
- İbrahimli, Kastamonu, a village in the District of Kastamonu, Kastamonu Province, Turkey
