= Ataturk Viaduct =

Ataturk Viaduct Atatürk Viyadüğü (Turkish)
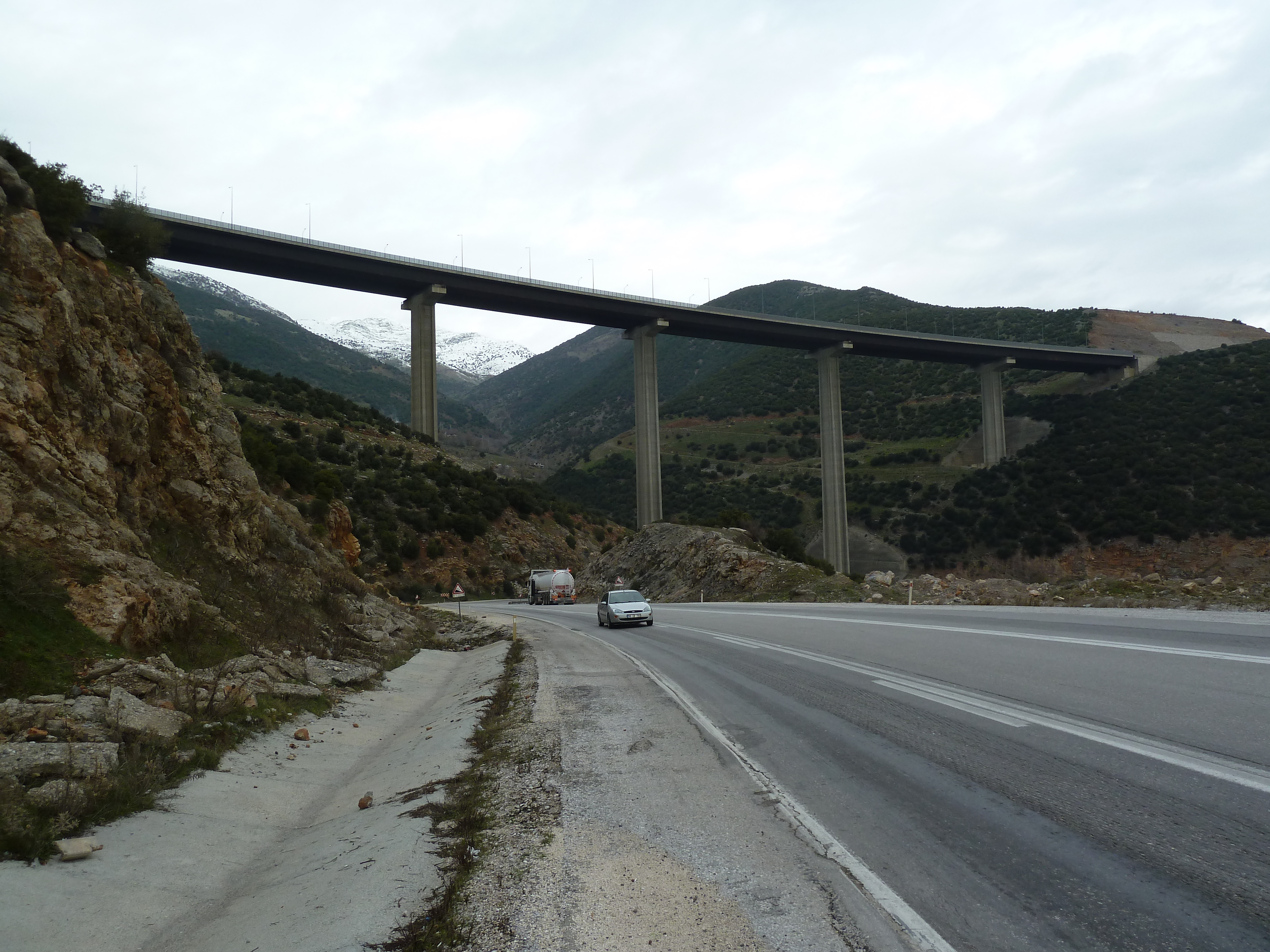
- Coordinates: 37°11′N 36°42′E
- Carries: Motorway 52
- Crosses: Mount Nur pass
- Locale: Kömürler, Nurdağı, Gaziantep, Turkey
- Official name: Atatürk Viyadüğü

Characteristics
- Material: Concrete, steel
- Total length: 801.5 m (2,630 ft)
- Height: 149.5 m (490 ft)

History
- Construction start: April 1993; 32 years ago
- Construction cost: US$95 Million
- Opened: June 1998; 27 years ago

Location
- Interactive map of Ataturk Viaduct

Atatürk Viaduct or Nurdağı Viaduct is the longest viaduct of Turkey and TAG motorway and the second longest viaduct in Europe, located at the Nurdağı pass of the Central Amanos Mountains on the Tarsus-Adana-Gaziantep (TAG) motorway in Nurdağı district of Gaziantep.

The viaduct, the construction of which started in April 1993 and completed in June 1998, has a length of 801.5 metres and a height of 149.5 metres. A total of US$95 million was spent on the construction of the viaduct. The viaduct was named after Mustafa Kemal Atatürk, the founder of the Republic of Turkey.

== 6 February 2023 Turkey earthquakes ==
The viaduct was damaged in the 6 February 2023 Kahramanmaraş earthquakes. After the earthquake, the viaduct, which served as a logistics for transportation from the West to the earthquake zone, was quickly repaired by the teams of the General Directorate of Highways and opened to traffic.

== Gallery ==
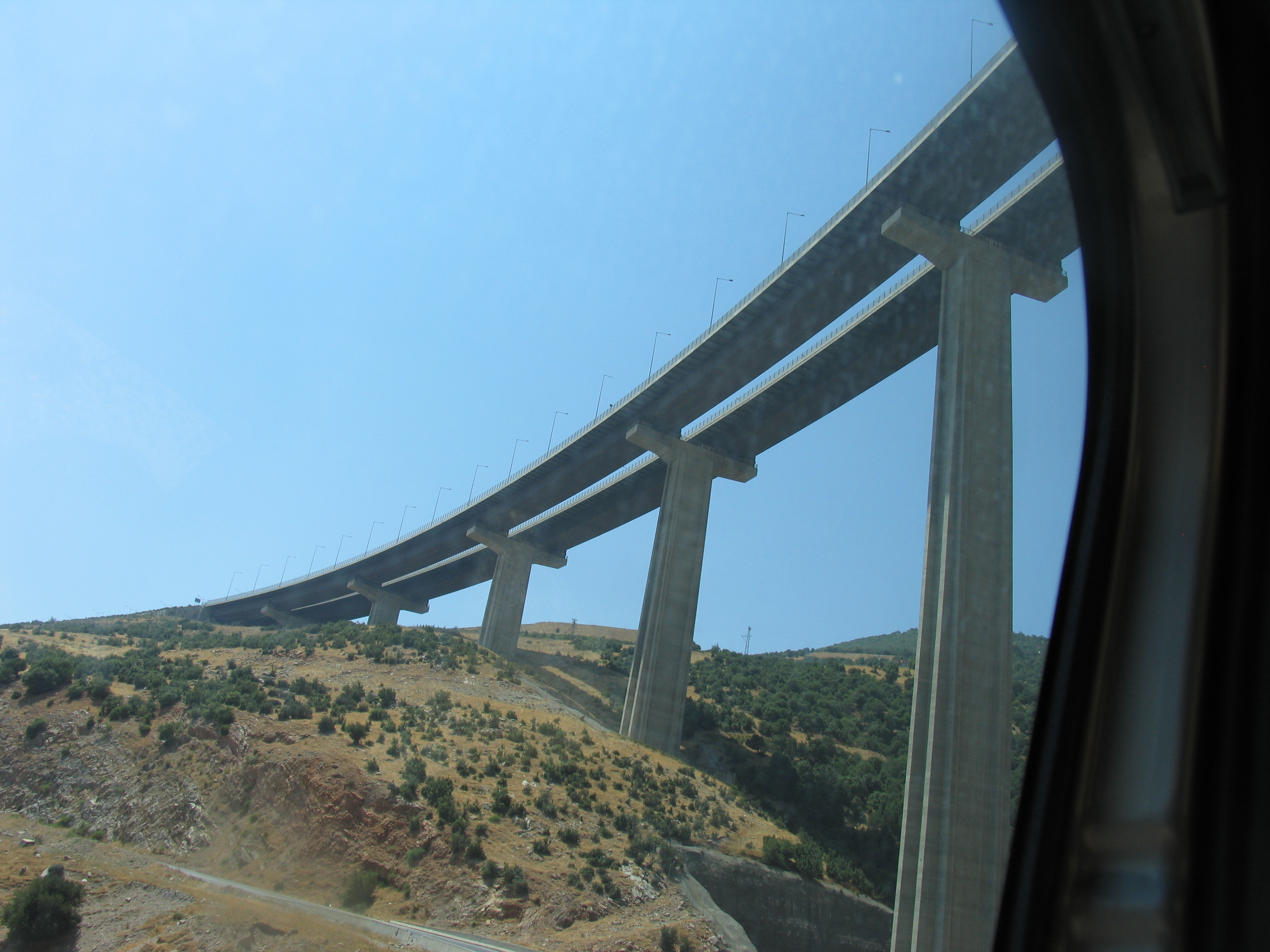
View of the viaduct from below

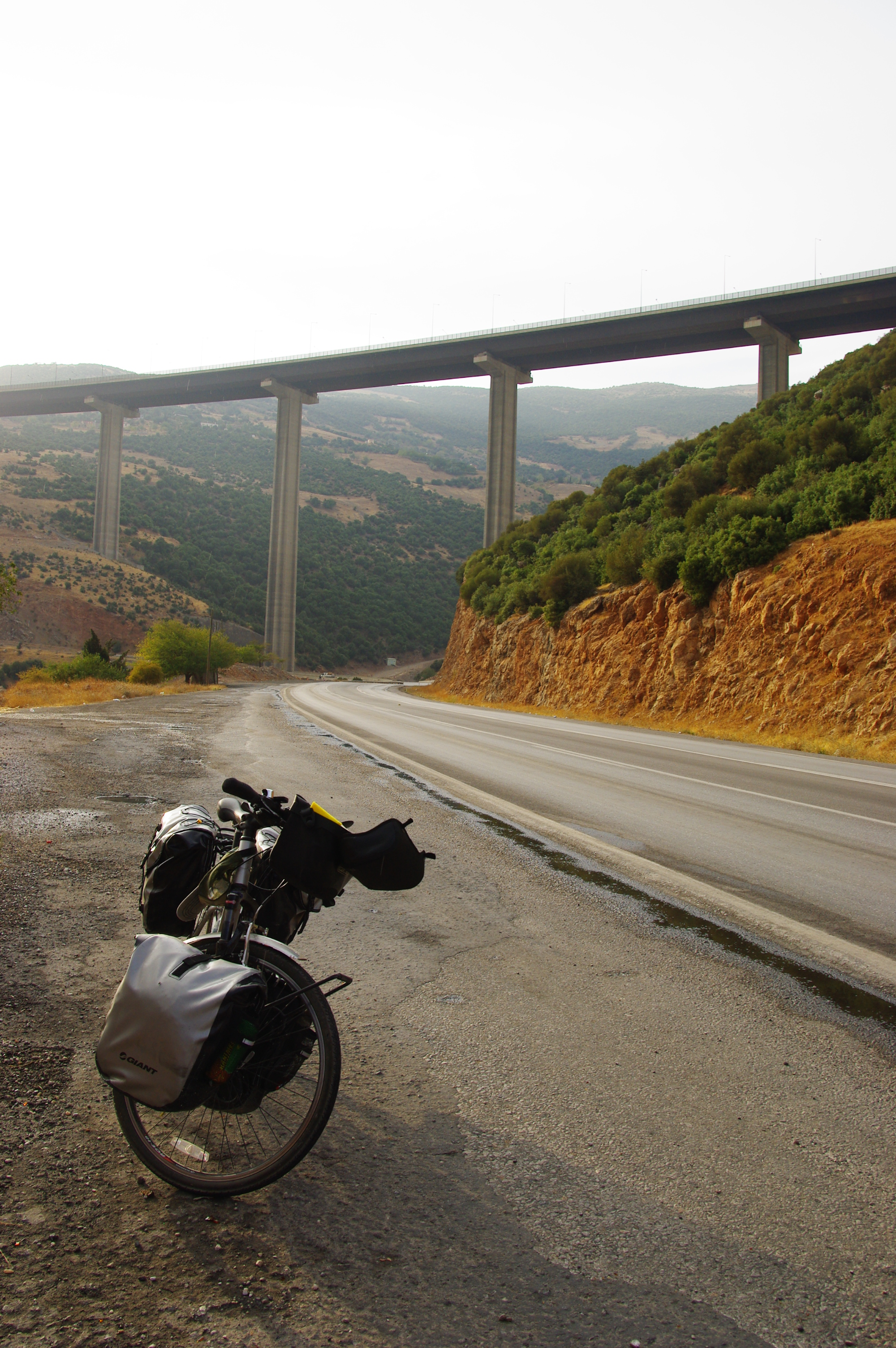
State road passing under the viaduct

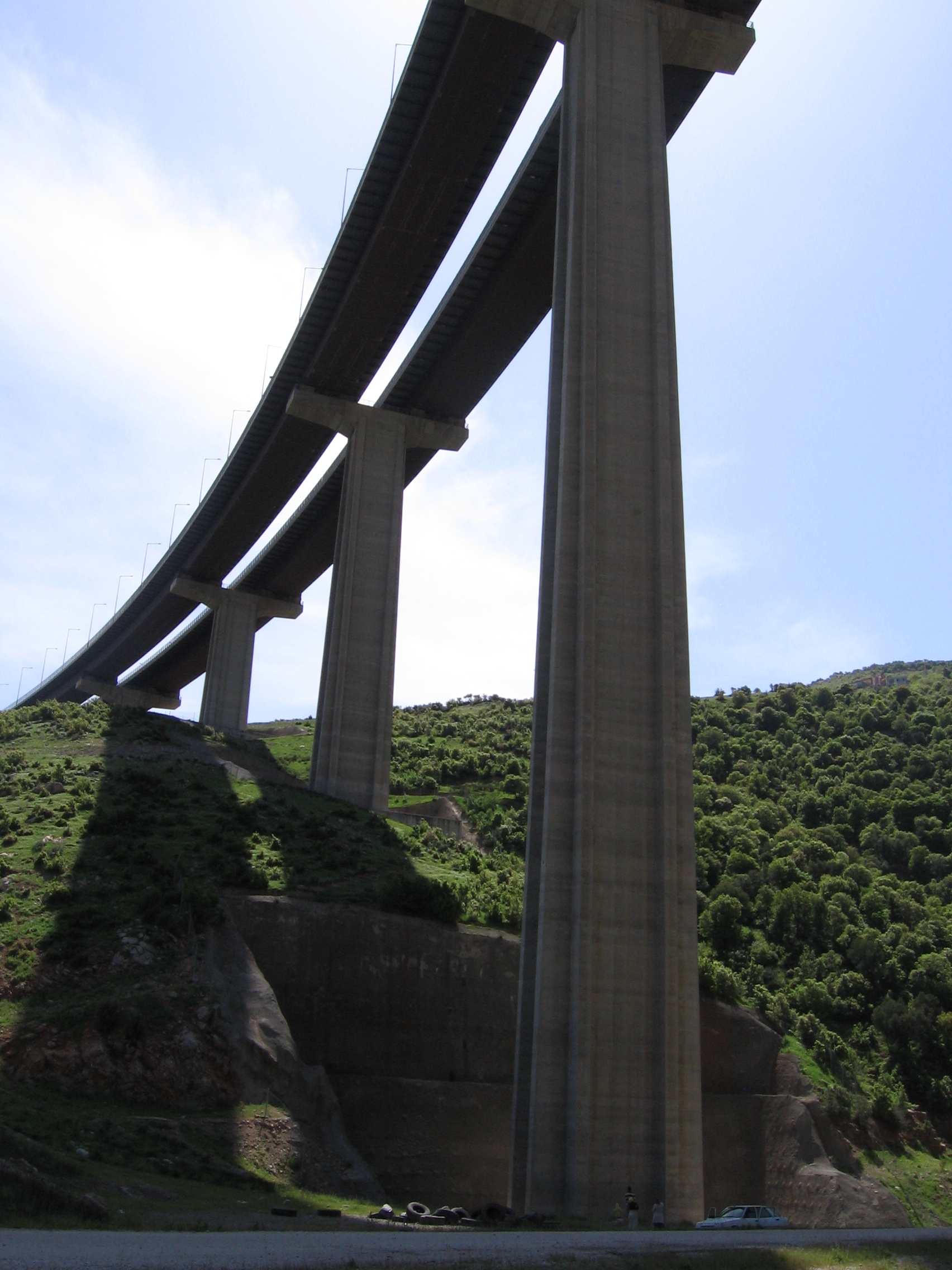
Footings of the viaduct

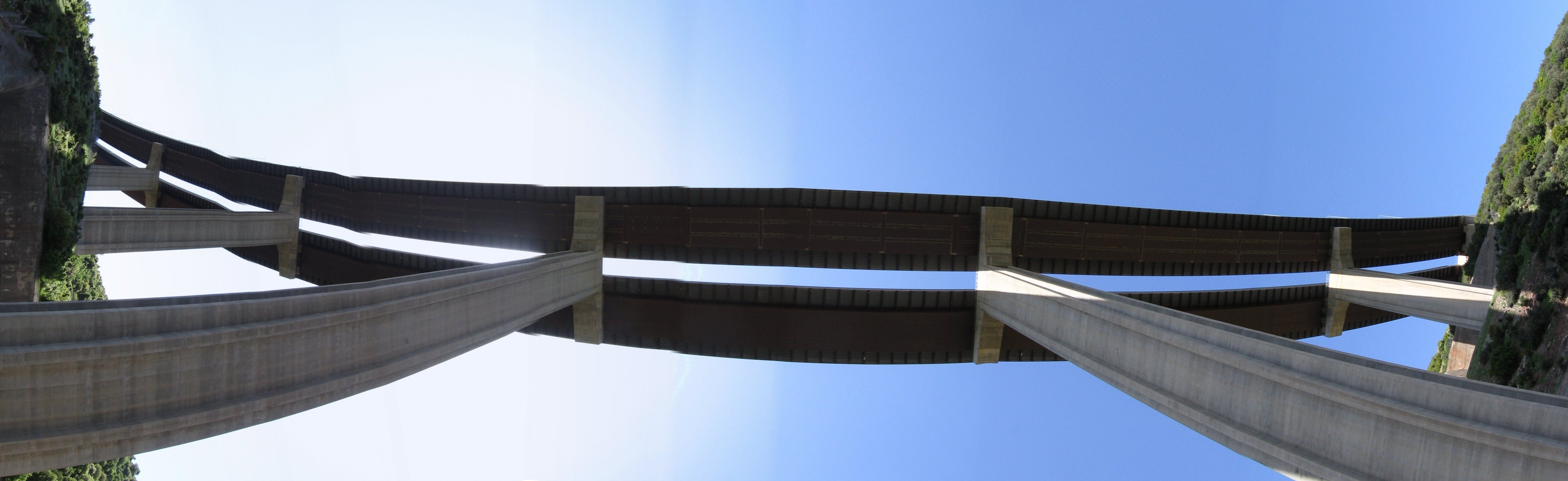
Panoramic view of the viaduct
