= Gözlühüyük, Nurdağı =

Village in Gaziantep Province, Turkey

Gözlühüyük
- Neighbourhood
- Location in Turkey
- Coordinates: 37°8′24″N 36°46′50″E
- Country: Turkey
- Province: Gaziantep
- District: Nurdağı
- Population (2022): 311
- Time zone: UTC+3 (TRT)

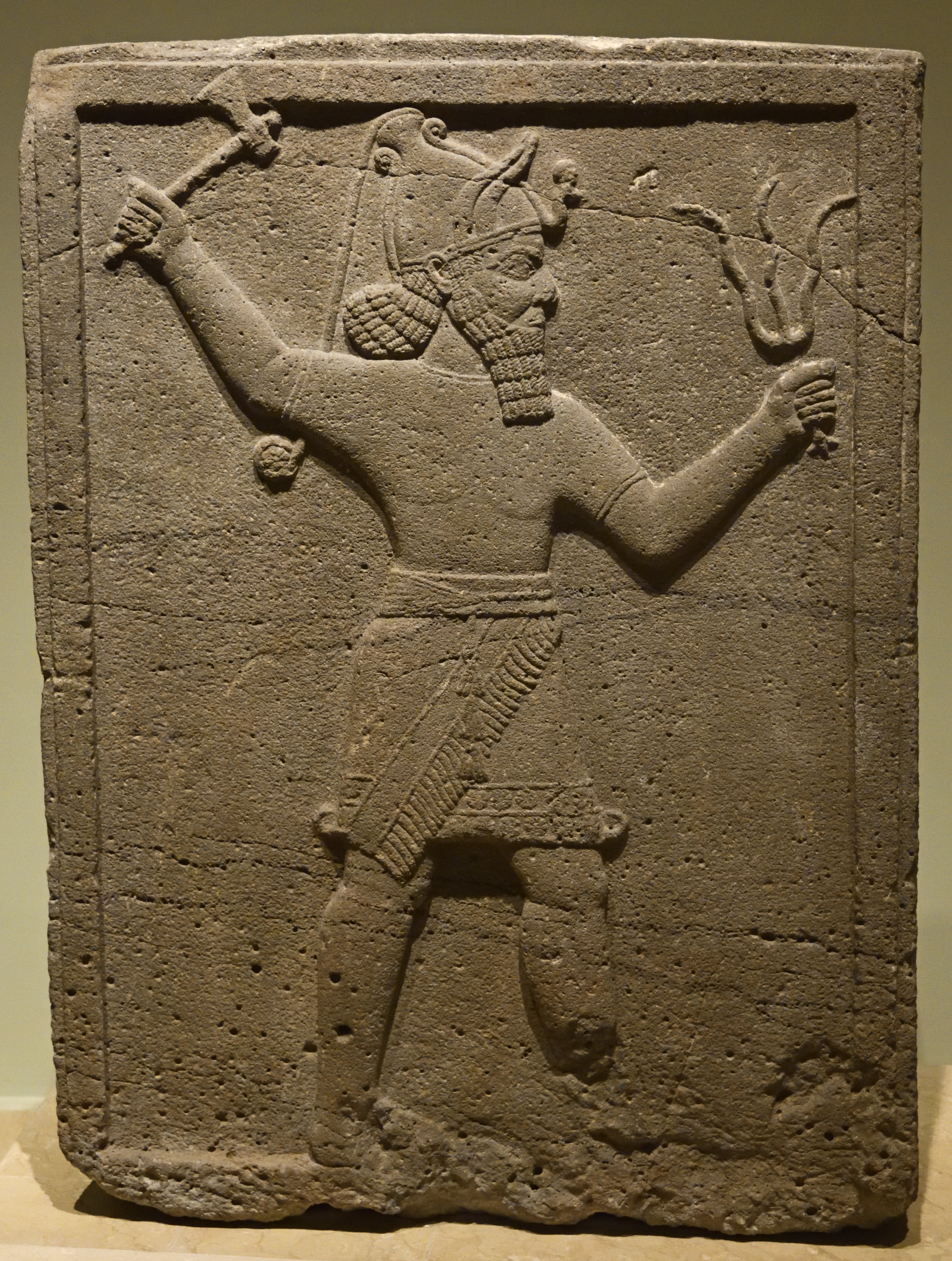
A stele of a weather god found in Gözlühüyük, dates 8th-7th centuries BC, now in Gaziantep Museum of Archaeology

Gözlühüyük, historically Kemezanlı, is a neighbourhood in the municipality and district of Nurdağı, Gaziantep Province, Turkey. Its population is 311 (2022). The village is populated by Kurds.
