= Bademli, Nurdağı =

Village in Gaziantep Province, Turkey

Bademli
- Neighbourhood
- Location in Turkey
- Coordinates: 37°13′4″N 36°44′29″E
- Country: Turkey
- Province: Gaziantep
- District: Nurdağı
- Population (2022): 494
- Time zone: UTC+3 (TRT)

Bademli is a neighbourhood in the municipality and district of Nurdağı, Gaziantep Province, Turkey. Its population is 494 (2022).
