= Atmalı, Nurdağı =

Village in Gaziantep Province, Turkey

Atmalı
- Neighbourhood
- Location in Turkey
- Coordinates: 37°7′54″N 36°52′42″E
- Country: Turkey
- Province: Gaziantep
- District: Nurdağı
- Population (2022): 264
- Time zone: UTC+3 (TRT)

Atmalı is a neighbourhood in the municipality and district of Nurdağı, Gaziantep Province, Turkey. The village is populated by Kurds of the Atma tribe and had a population of 264 in 2022.
