= Gedikli, Nurdağı =

Village in Gaziantep Province, Turkey

Gedikli
- Neighbourhood
- Location in Turkey
- Coordinates: 37°13′8″N 36°49′47″E
- Country: Turkey
- Province: Gaziantep
- District: Nurdağı
- Population (2022): 314
- Time zone: UTC+3 (TRT)

Gedikli is a neighbourhood in the municipality and district of Nurdağı, Gaziantep Province, Turkey. Its population is 314 (2022).
