= Naimler, Nurdağı =

Village in Gaziantep Province, Turkey

Naimler
- Neighbourhood
- Location within Turkey
- Coordinates: 37°14′26″N 36°55′2″E
- Country: Turkey
- Province: Gaziantep
- District: Nurdağı
- Population (2022): 190
- Time zone: UTC+3 (TRT)

Naimler is a neighbourhood in the municipality and district of Nurdağı, Gaziantep Province, Turkey. As of 2022, its population is 190.
