= Kartal, Nurdağı =

Village in Gaziantep Province, Turkey

Kartal
- Neighbourhood
- Location in Turkey
- Coordinates: 37°6′25″N 36°58′45″E
- Country: Turkey
- Province: Gaziantep
- District: Nurdağı
- Population (2022): 1,751
- Time zone: UTC+3 (TRT)

Kartal is a neighbourhood in the municipality and district of Nurdağı, Gaziantep Province, Turkey. Its population is 1,751 (2022). The village is inhabited by Turkmens.
