= Hamidiye, Nurdağı =

Village in Gaziantep Province, Turkey

Hamidiye
- Neighbourhood
- Location in Turkey
- Coordinates: 37°6′29″N 36°52′35″E
- Country: Turkey
- Province: Gaziantep
- District: Nurdağı
- Population (2022): 423
- Time zone: UTC+3 (TRT)

Hamidiye, historically Danacık, is a neighbourhood in the municipality and district of Nurdağı, Gaziantep Province, Turkey. Its population is 423 (2022). The village is populated by Kabardian Circassians.
