= Balıkalan, Nurdağı =

Village in Gaziantep Province, Turkey

Balıkalan
- Neighbourhood
- Location within Turkey
- Coordinates: 37°18′10″N 36°53′6″E
- Country: Turkey
- Province: Gaziantep
- District: Nurdağı
- Population (2022): 176
- Time zone: UTC+3 (TRT)

Balıkalan, also known as Balıkanlı, is a neighbourhood in the municipality and district of Nurdağı, Gaziantep Province, Turkey. The village is inhabited by Alevi Kurds and had a population of 176 in 2022.
