= Gökçedere, Nurdağı =

Village in Gaziantep Province, Turkey

Gökçedere
- Neighbourhood
- Location in Turkey
- Coordinates: 37°9′52″N 36°42′27″E
- Country: Turkey
- Province: Gaziantep
- District: Nurdağı
- Population (2022): 549
- Time zone: UTC+3 (TRT)

Gökçedere is a neighbourhood in the municipality and district of Nurdağı, Gaziantep Province, Turkey. Its population is 549 (2022).
