= İçerisu, Nurdağı =

Village in Gaziantep Province, Turkey

İçerisu
- Neighbourhood
- Location in Turkey
- Coordinates: 37°9′57″N 36°50′42″E
- Country: Turkey
- Province: Gaziantep
- District: Nurdağı
- Population (2022): 474
- Time zone: UTC+3 (TRT)

İçerisu is a neighbourhood in the municipality and district of Nurdağı, Gaziantep Province, Turkey. Its population is 474 (2022). It is populated by Turks. The village is also inhabited by Alevi or Bektashi Turkmens, who are locally known as Yalvaç and belong to the Sarı İsmail ocak.
