= Altınova, Nurdağı =

Village in Gaziantep Province, Turkey

Altınova
- Neighbourhood
- Location in Turkey
- Coordinates: 37°5′1″N 36°46′52″E
- Country: Turkey
- Province: Gaziantep
- District: Nurdağı
- Population (2022): 294
- Time zone: UTC+3 (TRT)

Altınova, historically Toplamalar, is a neighbourhood in the municipality and district of Nurdağı, Gaziantep Province, Turkey. The village is populated by Kurds of the Çelikan tribe and had a population of 294 in 2022.
