= Kuzoluk, Nurdağı =

Village in Gaziantep Province, Turkey

Kuzoluk
- Neighbourhood
- Location in Turkey
- Coordinates: 37°4′12″N 36°54′12″E
- Country: Turkey
- Province: Gaziantep
- District: Nurdağı
- Population (2022): 301
- Time zone: UTC+3 (TRT)

Kuzoluk is a neighbourhood in the municipality and district of Nurdağı, Gaziantep Province, Turkey. Its population is 301 (2022).
