= Başpınar, Nurdağı =

Village in Gaziantep Province, Turkey

Başpınar
- Neighbourhood
- Location in Turkey
- Coordinates: 37°11′41″N 36°43′40″E
- Country: Turkey
- Province: Gaziantep
- District: Nurdağı
- Population (2022): 661
- Time zone: UTC+3 (TRT)

Başpınar is a neighbourhood in the municipality and district of Nurdağı, Gaziantep Province, Turkey. Its population is 661 (2022).
