= Emirler, Nurdağı =

Village in Gaziantep Province, Turkey

Emirler
- Neighbourhood
- Location in Turkey
- Coordinates: 37°17′21″N 36°57′1″E
- Country: Turkey
- Province: Gaziantep
- District: Nurdağı
- Population (2022): 141
- Time zone: UTC+3 (TRT)

Emirler is a neighbourhood in the municipality and district of Nurdağı, Gaziantep Province, Turkey. Its population is 141 (2022).
