= Yaylacık, Nurdağı =

Village in Gaziantep Province, Turkey

Yaylacık
- Neighbourhood
- Location in Turkey
- Coordinates: 37°15′42″N 36°53′26″E
- Country: Turkey
- Province: Gaziantep
- District: Nurdağı
- Population (2022): 86
- Time zone: UTC+3 (TRT)

Yaylacık is a neighbourhood in the municipality and district of Nurdağı, Gaziantep Province, Turkey. Its population is 86 (2022). The village is populated by Kurds of the Atma tribe.
