= Torunlar, Nurdağı =

Village in Gaziantep Province, Turkey

Torunlar
- Neighbourhood
- Location in Turkey
- Coordinates: 37°04′01″N 36°48′25″E
- Country: Turkey
- Province: Gaziantep
- District: Nurdağı
- Population (2022): 204
- Time zone: UTC+3 (TRT)

Torunlar, also known as Katrancı, is a neighbourhood in the municipality and district of Nurdağı, Gaziantep Province, Turkey. Its population is 204 (2022). The village is inhabited by Kurds.
