= Durmuşlar, Nurdağı =

Village in Gaziantep Province, Turkey

Durmuşlar
- Neighbourhood
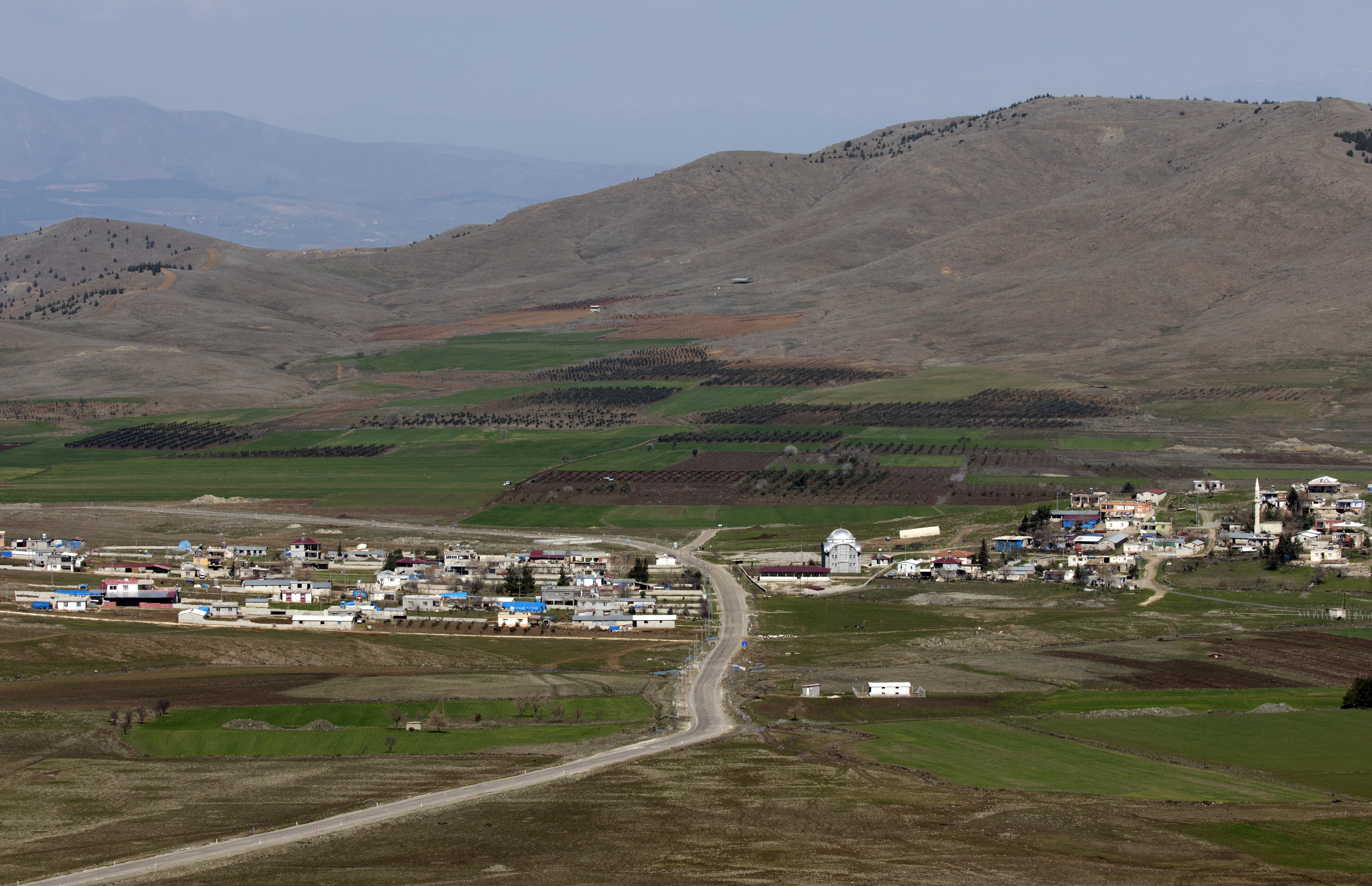
- A view of the village

- Location within Turkey
- Coordinates: 37°6′17″N 36°50′0″E
- Country: Turkey
- Province: Gaziantep
- District: Nurdağı
- Population (2022): 253
- Time zone: UTC+3 (TRT)

Durmuşlar is a neighbourhood in the municipality and district of Nurdağı, Gaziantep Province, Turkey. Its population is 253 (2022).

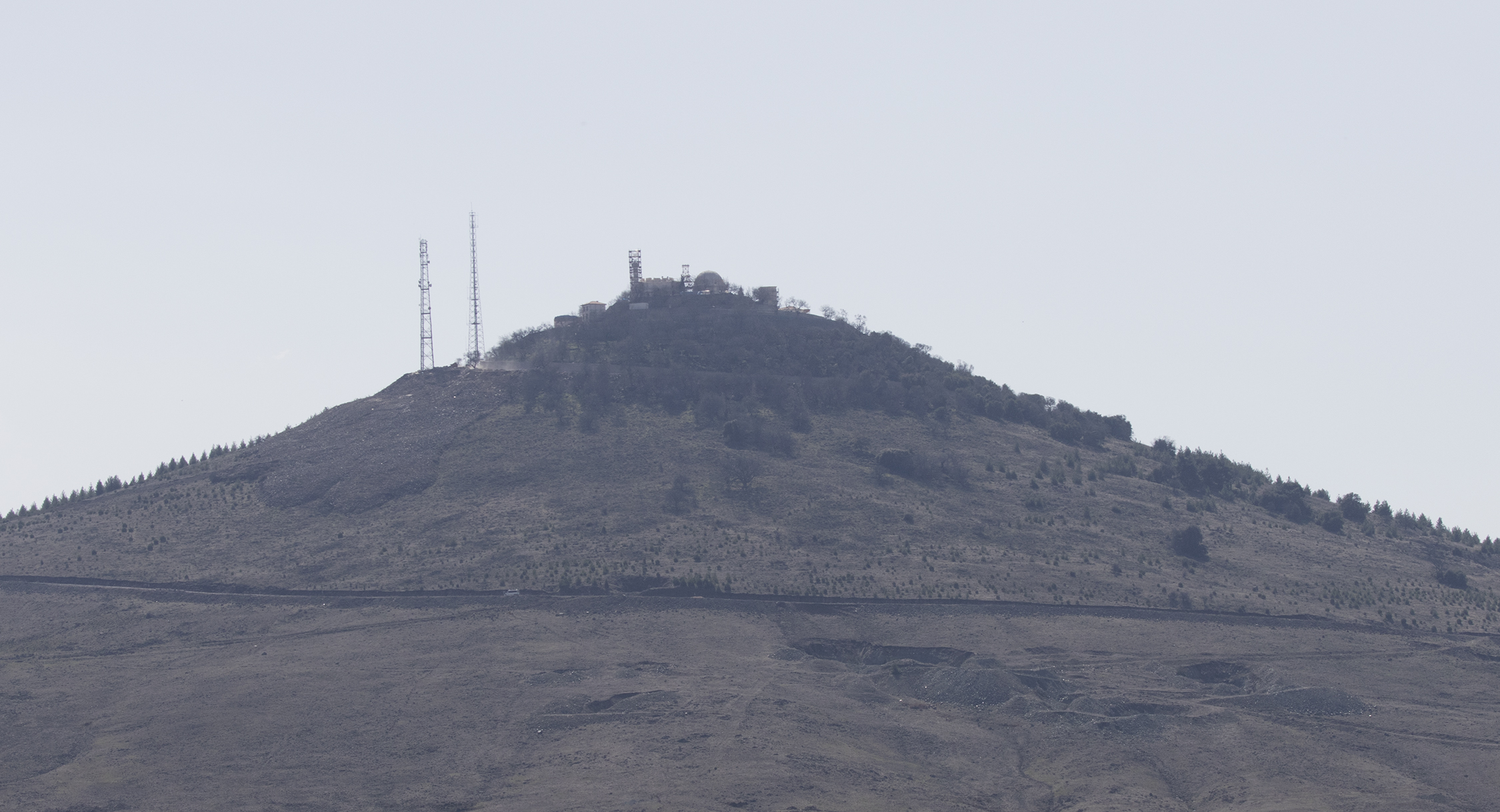
The village is located near a hill with a tomb believed to be of Ukasha ibn al-Mihsan.
