= Hisar, Nurdağı =

Village in Gaziantep Province, Turkey

Hisar
- Neighbourhood
- Location in Turkey
- Coordinates: 37°9′0″N 36°54′18″E
- Country: Turkey
- Province: Gaziantep
- District: Nurdağı
- Population (2022): 529
- Time zone: UTC+3 (TRT)

Hisar is a neighbourhood in the municipality and district of Nurdağı, Gaziantep Province, Turkey. Its population is 529 (2022). The village is inhabited by Kurds.
