= Belpınar, Nurdağı =

Village in Gaziantep Province, Turkey

Belpınar
- Neighbourhood
- Location in Turkey
- Coordinates: 37°13′12″N 36°45′50″E
- Country: Turkey
- Province: Gaziantep
- District: Nurdağı
- Population (2022): 151
- Time zone: UTC+3 (TRT)

Belpınar is a neighborhood in the municipality and district of Nurdağı, Gaziantep Province, Turkey. The village is populated by Kurds and had a population of 151 in 2022.

English traveler Mark Sykes recorded the village as inhabited by Delikan Kurds in early 20th century.
