= Demirler, Nurdağı =

Village in Gaziantep Province, Turkey

Demirler
- Neighbourhood
- Location in Turkey
- Coordinates: 37°7′11″N 36°56′14″E
- Country: Turkey
- Province: Gaziantep
- District: Nurdağı
- Population (2022): 101
- Time zone: UTC+3 (TRT)

Demirler is a neighbourhood in the municipality and district of Nurdağı, Gaziantep Province, Turkey. Its population is 101 (2022).
