= İncegedik, Nurdağı =

Village in Gaziantep Province, Turkey

İncegedik
- Neighbourhood
- Location in Turkey
- Coordinates: 37°3′39″N 36°45′51″E
- Country: Turkey
- Province: Gaziantep
- District: Nurdağı
- Population (2022): 165
- Time zone: UTC+3 (TRT)

İncegedik, historically Kürdükanlı, is a neighbourhood in the municipality and district of Nurdağı, Gaziantep Province, Turkey. Its population is 165 (2022). The village is populated by Kurds.
