= Ataköy, Nurdağı =

Village in Gaziantep Province, Turkey

Ataköy
- Neighbourhood
- Location in Turkey
- Coordinates: 37°7′55″N 36°53′54″E
- Country: Turkey
- Province: Gaziantep
- District: Nurdağı
- Population (2022): 80
- Time zone: UTC+3 (TRT)

Ataköy is a neighbourhood in the municipality and district of Nurdağı, Gaziantep Province, Turkey. Its population is 80 (2022).
