= Tandırlı, Nurdağı =

Village in Gaziantep Province, Turkey

Tandırlı
- Neighbourhood
- Location in Turkey
- Coordinates: 37°8′1″N 36°55′29″E
- Country: Turkey
- Province: Gaziantep
- District: Nurdağı
- Population (2022): 99
- Time zone: UTC+3 (TRT)

Tandırlı is a neighbourhood in the municipality and district of Nurdağı, Gaziantep Province, Turkey. Its population was 99 as per the consensus of 2022.
