= Havara =

Chalky substance used as roadstone

Havara is a type of chalky, powdery mixture of silt and limestone that is predominantly calcium carbonate in composition. It tends to form a surface coating of "limestone-marl areas". It is common in Cyprus, where it is used as gravel for roads. Soft and easily carved, it is widely used in construction throughout the Middle East. For example, it was used for the interior of the Gaziantep railway station. Havara is vulnerable to weathering.

== Occurrence and formation ==
Havara typically appears as a soft, porous mantle of white to buff, carbonate-rich sediment draped over chalky and marly outcrops in Cyprus. Its fine-grained matrix ranges from silt to sand, with locally abundant pebbles and occasional boulders derived from the underlying limestone and ophiolite blocks; analyses of geographically diverse samples report a calcium carbonate content of 75–91 %. In the field, it accumulates most conspicuously as colluvial slope debris at the base of hillsides, as fan-shaped aprons ("debris cones") below small valleys, or as a thin veneer over gentler terrain. Its loose, powdery consistency makes it ideal both for mixing into roadstone and—as has been done traditionally throughout the Levant—for carving into building blocks and decorative architectural elements.

Geologically, havara is not an in situ soil horizon but a mechanically transported deposit. Investigations at the Kalavasós–Märcou section reveal rhythmic alternations of silt-rich talus (havara) and humic, calcic regosols, reflecting repeated phases of slope erosion under sparse vegetation interspersed with brief soil-forming intervals. Charcoal fragments from two intercalated soils yielded radiocarbon ages of 31,970 ± 910 BP and 27,440 ± 1 600 BP, placing most havara deposition in the colder, less vegetated stages of the last (Würmian) glacial cycle. This contrasts with kafkalla (caliche), which forms by post-depositional carbonate precipitation within the soil profile rather than by physical accumulation of clastic debris.
