= Nogaylar, Nurdağı =

Village in Gaziantep Province, Turkey

Nogaylar
- Neighbourhood
- Location within Turkey
- Coordinates: 37°13′46″N 36°52′11″E
- Country: Turkey
- Province: Gaziantep
- District: Nurdağı
- Population (2022): 430
- Time zone: UTC+3 (TRT)

Nogaylar is a neighbourhood in the municipality and district of Nurdağı, Gaziantep Province, Turkey. Its population is 430 (2022). The village is inhabited by Yörüks, Nogais and Karachays.

== History ==
The village was founded by 90 families of Nogais in 1865. However, they later suffered an epidemic of malaria, and much of those who survived left for the villages near Kayseri. Only two Nogai families remained.
