= İkizkuyu, Nurdağı =

Village in Gaziantep Province, Turkey

İkizkuyu
- Neighbourhood
- Location in Turkey
- Coordinates: 37°8′24″N 36°58′36″E
- Country: Turkey
- Province: Gaziantep
- District: Nurdağı
- Population (2022): 142
- Time zone: UTC+3 (TRT)

İkizkuyu is a neighbourhood in the municipality and district of Nurdağı, Gaziantep Province, Turkey. Its population is 142 (2022). The village is inhabited by Arabs.
