= Sayburun, Nurdağı =

Village in Gaziantep Province, Turkey

Sayburun
- Neighbourhood
- Location in Turkey
- Coordinates: 37°6′23″N 36°46′41″E
- Country: Turkey
- Province: Gaziantep
- District: Nurdağı
- Population (2022): 230
- Time zone: UTC+3 (TRT)

Sayburun is a neighbourhood in the municipality and district of Nurdağı, Gaziantep Province, Turkey. Its population is 230 (2022). The village is populated by Yörüks.
