= Olucak, Nurdağı =

Village in Gaziantep Province, Turkey

Olucak
- Neighbourhood
- Location in Turkey
- Coordinates: 37°10′54″N 36°41′45″E
- Country: Turkey
- Province: Gaziantep
- District: Nurdağı
- Population (2022): 441
- Time zone: UTC+3 (TRT)

Olucak is a neighbourhood in the municipality and district of Nurdağı, Gaziantep Province, Turkey. As of 2022, its population was 441 people.
