= Kömürler, Nurdağı =

Village in Gaziantep Province, Turkey

Kömürler
- Neighbourhood
- Location in Turkey
- Coordinates: 37°9′50″N 36°48′33″E
- Country: Turkey
- Province: Gaziantep
- District: Nurdağı
- Population (2022): 402
- Time zone: UTC+3 (TRT)

Kömürler is a neighbourhood in the municipality and district of Nurdağı, Gaziantep Province, Turkey. Its population is 402 (2022). The village is populated by Turks, Kurds, and Arabs.
