= Çakmak, Nurdağı =

Village in Gaziantep Province, Turkey

Çakmak
- Neighbourhood
- Location in Turkey
- Coordinates: 37°11′37″N 36°50′50″E
- Country: Turkey
- Province: Gaziantep
- District: Nurdağı
- Population (2022): 192
- Time zone: UTC+3 (TRT)

Çakmak, also known as Çerkes Çakmağı or Muhacirincedit, is a neighbourhood in the municipality and district of Nurdağı, Gaziantep Province, Turkey.

It is inhabited by Circassians, Alevi Kurds and Sunni Turks, and had a population of 192 in 2022. Circassian tribes in the village are the Abzakhs, Kabardians, and Shapsugs.
