= İncirli, Nurdağı =

Village in Gaziantep Province, Turkey

İncirli
- Neighbourhood
- Location in Turkey
- Coordinates: 37°15′33″N 36°57′8″E
- Country: Turkey
- Province: Gaziantep
- District: Nurdağı
- Population (2022): 539
- Time zone: UTC+3 (TRT)

İncirli is a neighbourhood in the municipality and district of Nurdağı, Gaziantep Province, Turkey. Its population is 539 (2022). The village is inhabited by Alevi Turks.
