= Tüllüce, Nurdağı =

Village in Gaziantep Province, Turkey

Tüllüce
- Neighbourhood
- Location in Turkey
- Coordinates: 37°9′3″N 36°51′43″E
- Country: Turkey
- Province: Gaziantep
- District: Nurdağı
- Population (2022): 300
- Time zone: UTC+3 (TRT)

Tüllüce is a neighbourhood in the municipality and district of Nurdağı, Gaziantep Province, Turkey. Its population is 300 (2022).
