= Kurudere, Nurdağı =

Village in Gaziantep Province, Turkey

Kurudere
- Neighbourhood
- Location within Turkey
- Coordinates: 37°11′13″N 36°43′25″E
- Country: Turkey
- Province: Gaziantep
- District: Nurdağı
- Population (2022): 1,288
- Time zone: UTC+3 (TRT)

Kurudere is a neighbourhood in the municipality and district of Nurdağı, Gaziantep Province, Turkey. Its population is 1,288 (2022).
