= Kırkpınar, Nurdağı =

Village in Gaziantep Province, Turkey

Kırkpınar
- Neighbourhood
- Location in Turkey
- Coordinates: 37°3′38″N 36°51′59″E
- Country: Turkey
- Province: Gaziantep
- District: Nurdağı
- Population (2022): 317
- Time zone: UTC+3 (TRT)

Kırkpınar is a neighbourhood in the municipality and district of Nurdağı, Gaziantep Province, Turkey. Its population is 317 (2022).
