= Kırışkal, Nurdağı =

Village in Gaziantep Province, Turkey

Kırışkal
- Neighbourhood
- Location in Turkey
- Coordinates: 37°14′36″N 36°51′6″E
- Country: Turkey
- Province: Gaziantep
- District: Nurdağı
- Population (2022): 292
- Time zone: UTC+3 (TRT)

Kırışkal is a neighbourhood in the municipality and district of Nurdağı, Gaziantep Province, Turkey. Its population is 292 (2022). The village is inhabited by Kurds.
