= Terken, Nurdağı =

Village in Gaziantep Province, Turkey

Terken
- Neighbourhood
- Location in Turkey
- Coordinates: 37°7′27″N 37°0′26″E
- Country: Turkey
- Province: Gaziantep
- District: Nurdağı
- Population (2022): 709
- Time zone: UTC+3 (TRT)

Terken is a neighbourhood in the municipality and district of Nurdağı, Gaziantep Province, Turkey. Its population is 709 (2022).
