= Karaburçlu, Nurdağı =

Village in Gaziantep Province, Turkey

Karaburçlu
- Neighbourhood
- Location in Turkey
- Coordinates: 37°8′36″N 36°41′58″E
- Country: Turkey
- Province: Gaziantep
- District: Nurdağı
- Population (2022): 135
- Time zone: UTC+3 (TRT)

Karaburçlu is a neighbourhood in the municipality and district of Nurdağı, Gaziantep Province, Turkey. Its population is 135 (2022). The village is inhabited by Kurds.
