= Mesthüyük, Nurdağı =

Village in Gaziantep Province, Turkey

Mesthüyük
- Neighbourhood
- Location in Turkey
- Coordinates: 37°13′01″N 36°48′50″E
- Country: Turkey
- Province: Gaziantep
- District: Nurdağı
- Population (2022): 167
- Time zone: UTC+3 (TRT)

Mesthüyük is a neighbourhood in the municipality and district of Nurdağı, Gaziantep Province, Turkey. Its population is 167 (2022). The village is inhabited by Kurds of the Çelikan tribe.
