= Gaziantep Tram =

Mainline route in turkey

Gaziantep Tramway
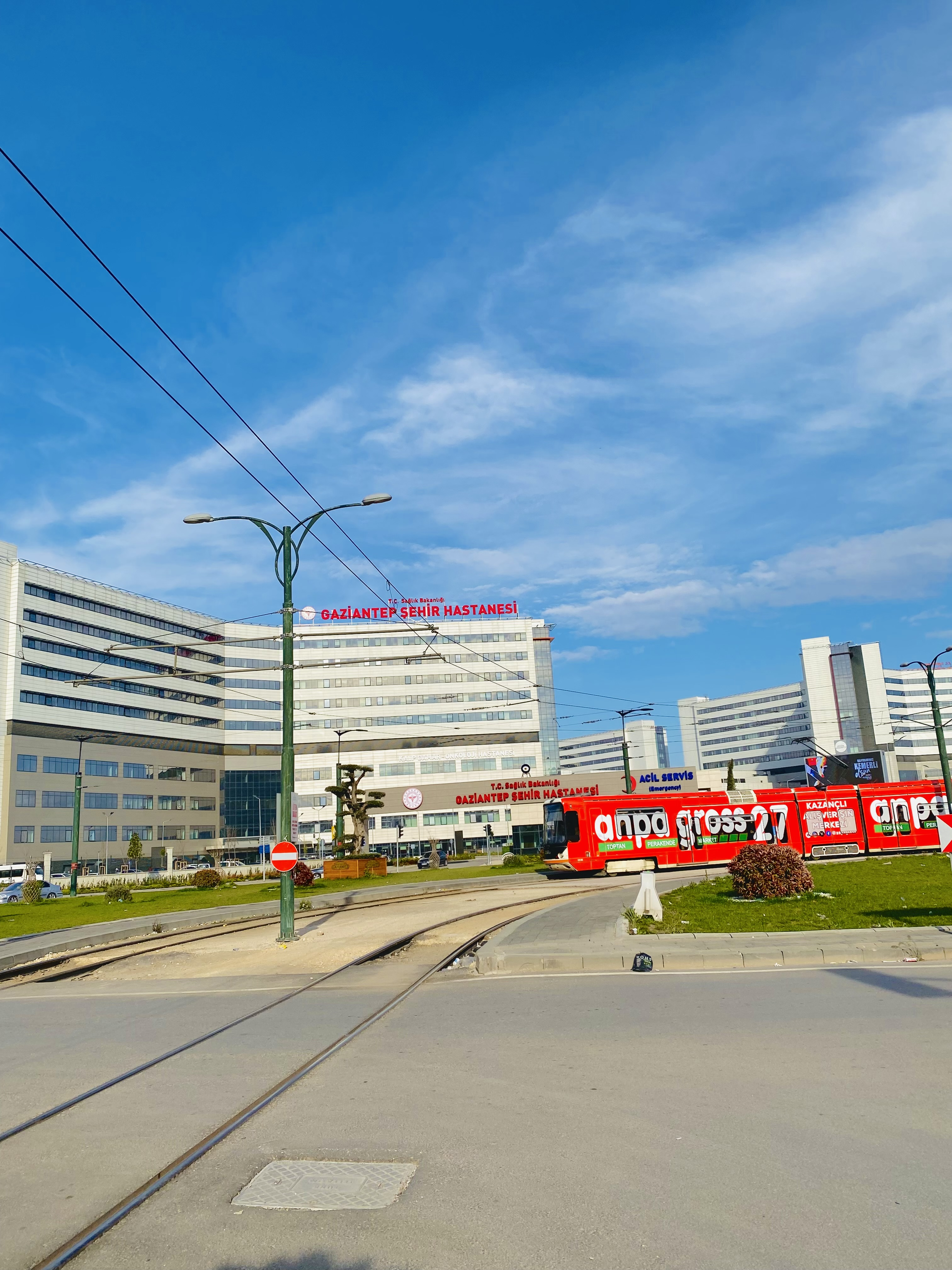
- Gaziantep City Hospital and T1 Ibn-i Sina - Gar tram.

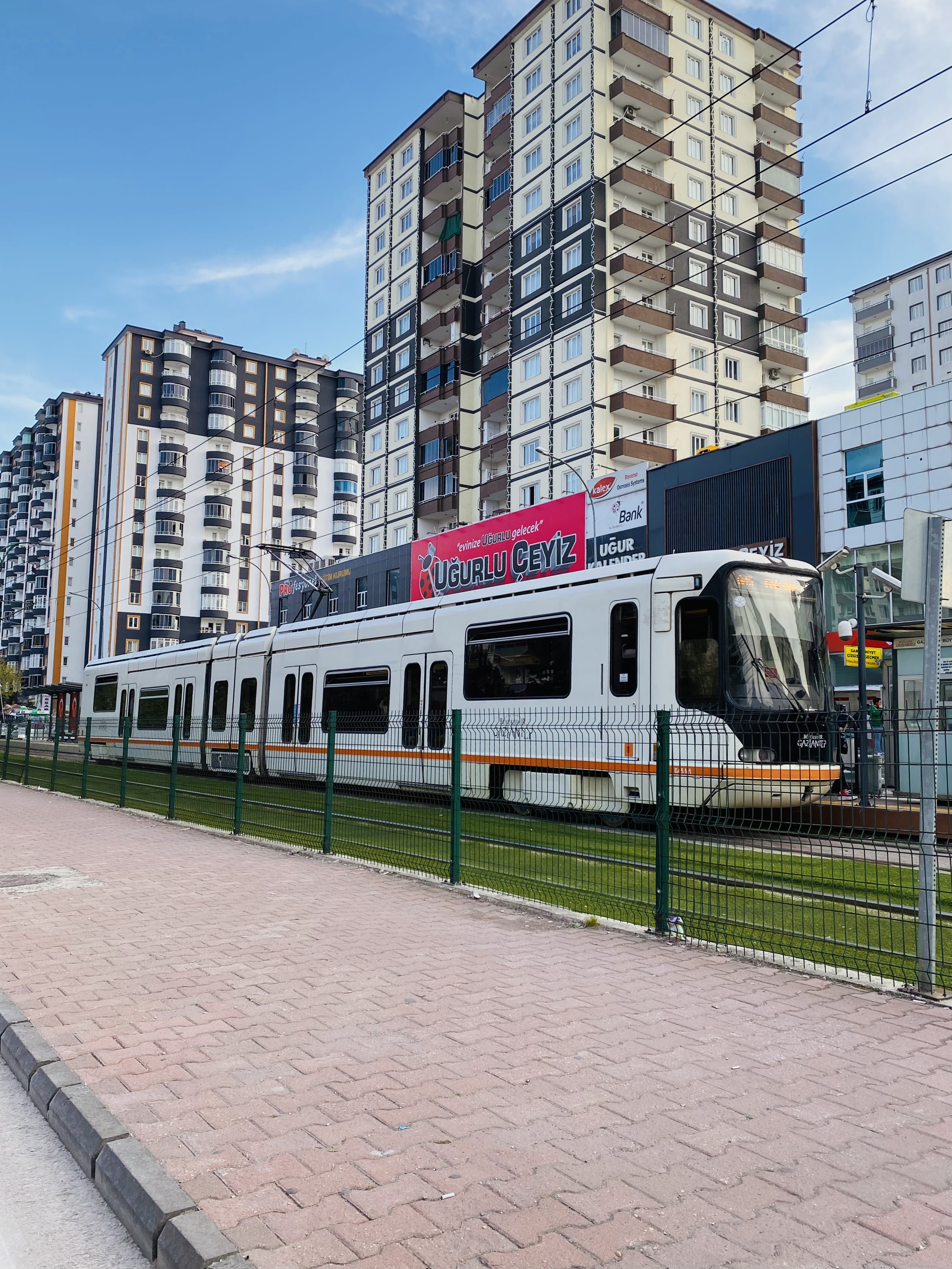
- Tram unloading passengers from Karatas Central station.

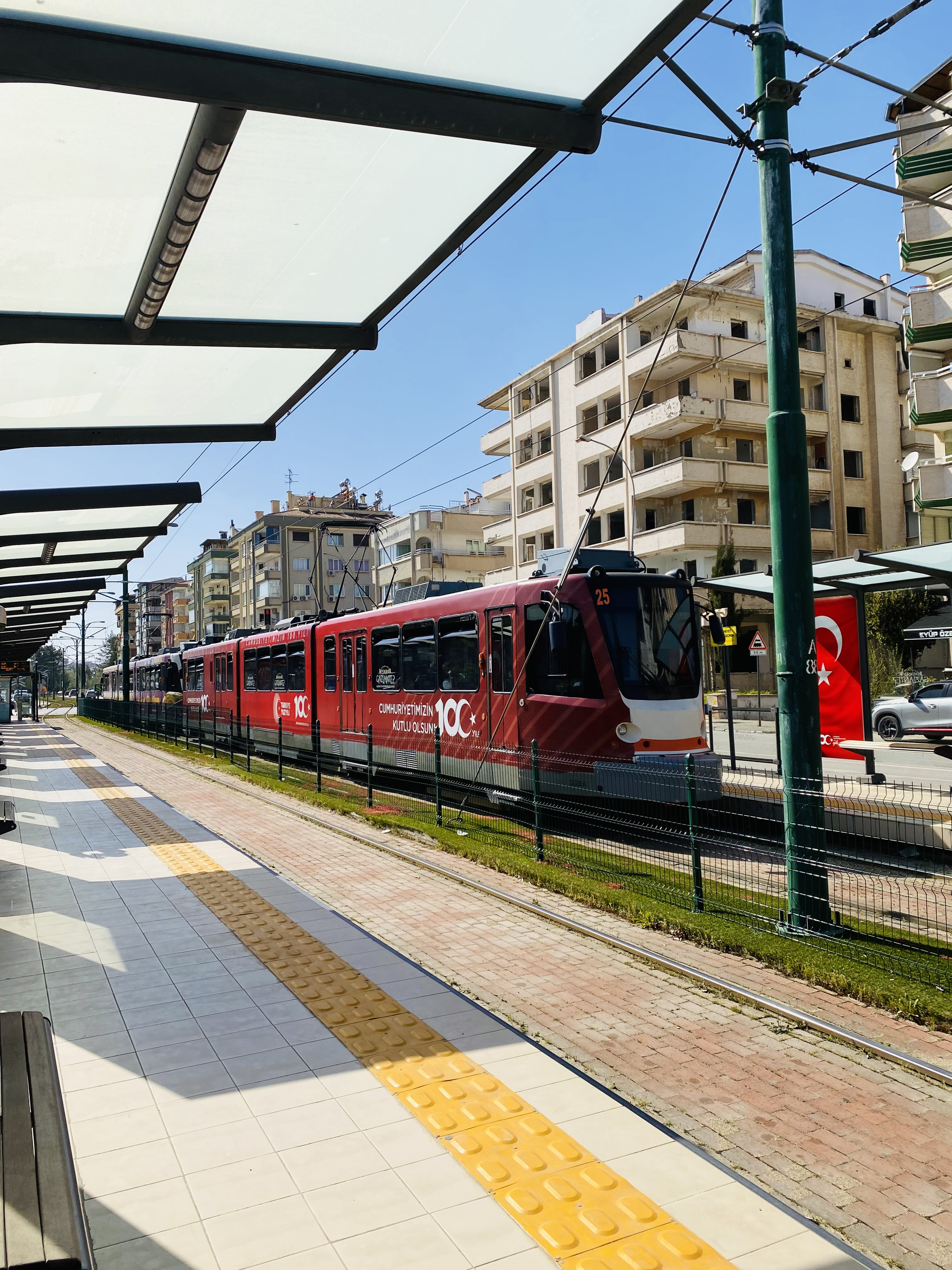
- T2 train from Masal Park station to the courthouse.

Overview
- Owner: Gaziantep Metropolitan Municipality
- Locale: Gaziantep
- Transit type: Light Rail
- Number of lines: 3
- Number of stations: 46
- Daily ridership: 75,000
- Annual ridership: 27,383,750
- Website: gaziulas.com

Operation
- Began operation: 1 March 2011; 15 years ago
- Number of vehicles: 56

Technical
- System length: 35 km
- Track gauge: Standard (1,435mm)
- Average speed: 35
- Top speed: 80

The Gaziantep Tram is a tram system located in Gaziantep, Turkey. Gaziantep's first tram line opened on March 1, 2011. The system is 35 km (22 mi) long with three lines and has 46 stations. The tram system carries 75,000 daily riders. The tram system connects the Gaziantep Railway Station with its northern, southern and western suburbs.

== History ==
In 2006, the Gaziantep Metropolitan Municipality's leadership announced that a tram network would be constructed in the city. Gaziantep has seen rapid population growth in recent decades and it was determined that a formal rail mass transit system would need to be designed and constructed in order to address vehicle traffic congestion. The tram was built in three phases now consisting of three unique lines. The first line was between Gar Gaziantep Railway Station and Burç Junction. Construction began on this line in 2008 and was completed in 2011. The first phase of the tram was 9.5 km (5.9 mi).

Phase Two of the tram system entailed the construction of a 5.5 km (3.4 mi) line between Gaziantep University and Akkent. Construction of the second phase of the tram system began in June 2011 and completed in September 2012.

The third stage of the tram network extended from the city center to the western suburban district of İbrahimli. Construction of Line Three began in 2013 and was opened to the public in March 2014. The system was restructured in 2016 to comprise three operational lines. The tram system is operated by Gaziantep Transportation A.Ş.

Gaziantep was the site of a 7.8 earthquake on the morning of February 6, 2023. The incident caused severe damage to the city and killed 3,273 residents. Tram service was suspended between February 6, 2023 and February 10, 2023. Service on all three lines along with public buses resumed February 10, 2023 with the government announcing all lines would be free to riders until February 27, 2023.

== Lines ==
A diagram of trams (in Turkish)

Line	Route	Opening	Length (km)	Number of stops
One	Courthouse - Burç Junction	2011	10.7	14
Two	Courthouse - Gaziantep Railway Station	2012	9.5	14
Three	Ibni Sina - Gaziantep Railway Station	2014	14.9	19

== Line One ==
Line One of the Gaziantep Tram runs south to north from the western suburbs of Gaziantep to the northern suburbs of the city known as İbrahimli. The line terminates in the north of the city at the Gaziantep Court House. The line consists of 14 stations, runs 10.7 km (6.6 mi). Phase one opened in 2011.

Name	Station	District
1	Adilye	Şehitkamil
2	Kolej Vakfi	Şehitkamil
3	Guvenevler	Şehitkamil
4	Duisburg	Şehitkamil
5	Ibrahimli Merkez	Ibrahimli
6	Ali Ishan Gogus	Ibrahimli
7	Olimpik Havuz	Ibrahimli
8	Sanko Okullari	Ibrahimli
9	Kadi Degirmeni	Ibrahimli
10	Rasaf Yolu	Ibrahimli
11	Binevler	Ibrahimli
12	Tip Fakultesi	Ibrahimli
13	Gaziantep University	Ibrahimli
14	Burç Junction	Ibrahimli

== Line Two ==
Line Two of the Gaziantep Tram runs south to north from the northern suburbs of Gaziantep to the city center. The line terminates in the north of the city at the Gaziantep Railway Station. The line consists of 14 stations and runs 9.5 km (5.9 mi). Phase Two opened in 2012.

Name	Station	District
1	Adilye	Şehitkamil
2	Kolej Vakfi	Şehitkamil
3	Guvenevler	Şehitkamil
4	Duisburg	Şehitkamil
5	Ibrahimli Merkez	Ibrahimli
6	Ali Ishan Gogus	Ibrahimli
7	Olimpik Havuz	Ibrahimli
8	Sanko Okullari	Ibrahimli
9	Harikalar Diyari	Şahinbey
10	Masal Parki	Şahinbey
11	25 Aralik Devlet Hastanesi	Şahinbey
12	Gazi Muhtar Pasa	Şahinbey
13	15 Temmuz Demokrasi Meydani	Şahinbey
14	Gaziantep Railway Station	Şahinbey

== Line Three ==
Line Three of the Gaziantep Tram runs from the City Center and Gaziantep Railway Station to Ibni Sina in the city's southern suburbs. The line terminates in the south of the city at Gaziantep's new regional medical center. The line consists of 19 stations and runs 14.9 km (9.3 mi). Phase Three opened in 2014.

Name	Station	District
1	Gaziantep Railway Station	Şahinbey
2	15 Temmuz Demokrasi Meydani	Şahinbey
3	Gazi Muhtar Pasa	Şahinbey
4	25 Aralik Devlet Hastanesi	Şahinbey
5	Masal Parki	Şahinbey
6	Harikalar Diyari	Şahinbey
7	Kadi Degirmeni	Şahinbey
8	Rasaf Yolu	Şahinbey
9	Binevler	Şahinbey
10	Tip Fakultesi	Şahinbey
11	Gaziantep University	Şahinbey
12	Guneykent	Karataş
13	Sahinbey Parki	Karataş
14	Karatas Merkez	Karataş
15	Karatas 1. Bolge	Karataş
16	Akkent Parki	Akkent
17	Akkent Meydani	Akkent
18	Akkent	Akkent
19	Ibni Sina	Akkent

== Gallery ==
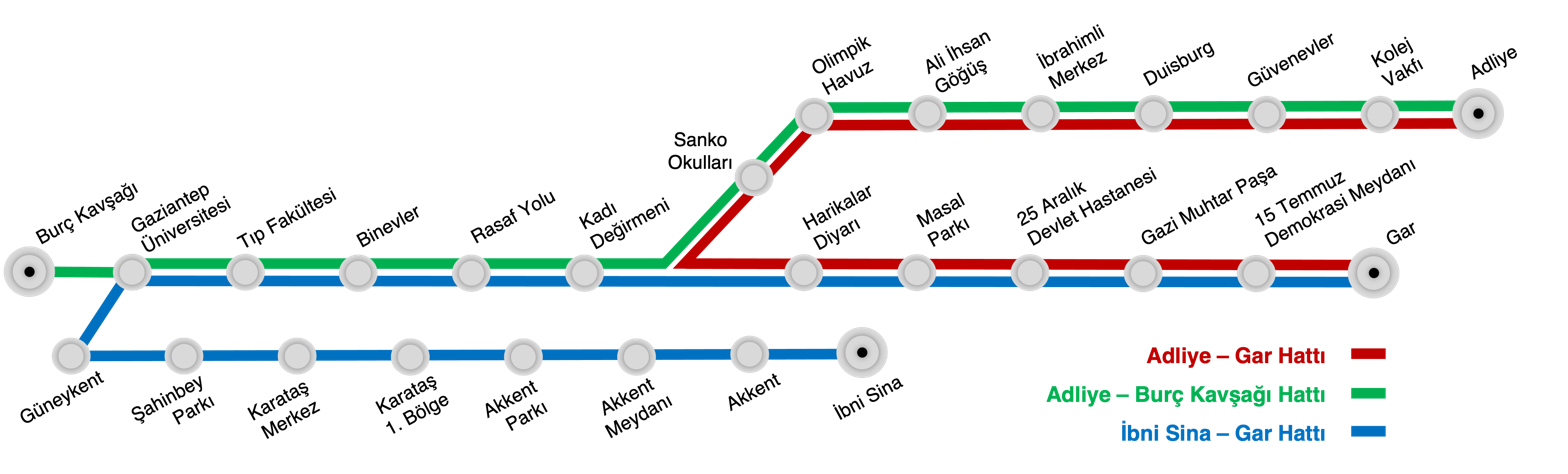
