= Adana–Aleppo railway =

Railway line in Turkey and Syria

Adana-Aleppo railway
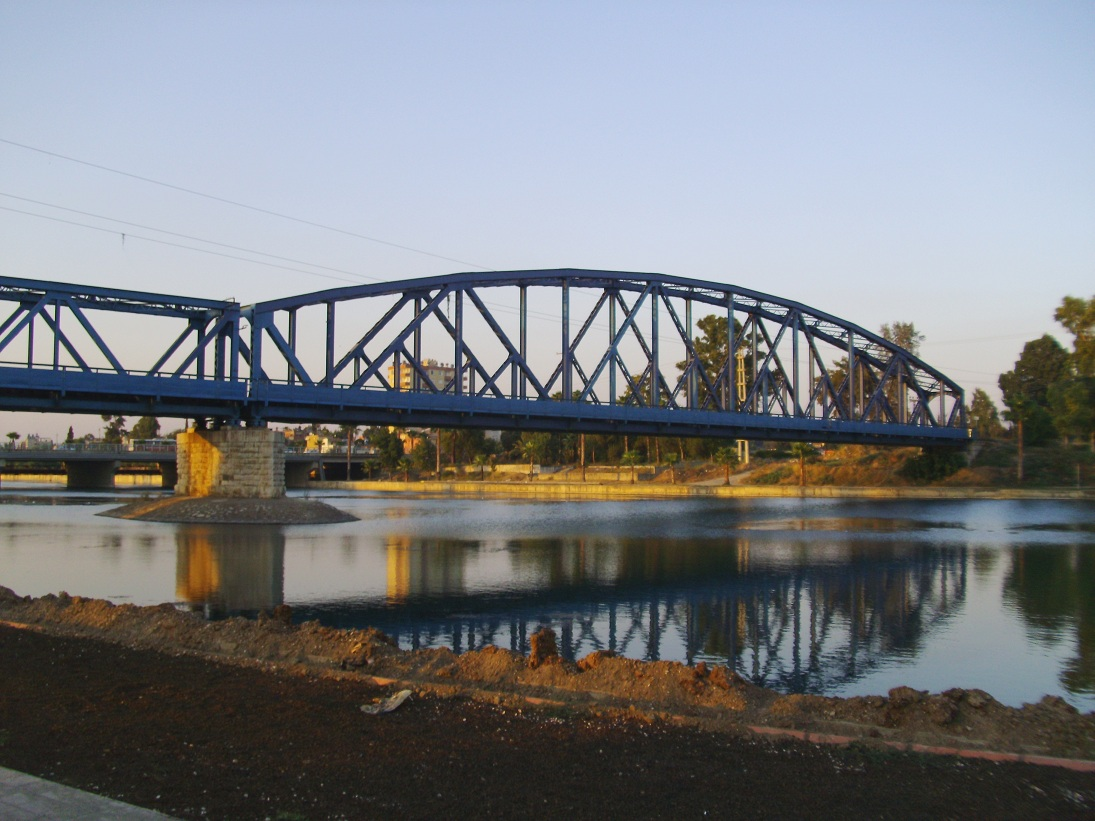
- The railway crossing the Seyhan River in Adana.

Overview
- Native name: Adana-Halep demiryolu
- Status: Operating
- Locale: Çukurova; Aintab plateau Aleppo plateau
- Termini: Adana, Turkey; Aleppo, Syria

Service
- Type: Heavy rail
- System: Turkish State Railways; Syrian Railways

History
- Opened: 27 April 1912
- Ayran Tunnel completed: 1917

Technical
- Line length: 297.4 km (184.8 mi)
- Num of tracks: Single track
- Track gauge: 1,435 mm (4 ft 8 1/2 in) standard gauge
- Electrification: 25 kV, 15 Hz
- Operating speed: 120 km (75 mi) (Max.)
- Signalling: ETCS L0

The Adana-Aleppo railway (Turkish: Adana-Halep demiryolu) is a 297.4 km (184.8 mi) long electrified railway mostly in southern Turkey. The railway begins in Adana and heads east through Osmaniye, then turns south after crossing the Nur Mountains and runs into Syria. Due to the outbreak of the Syrian Civil War in 2011, the 118 kilometres (73 mi) portion of the route within Syria is mostly abandoned and in disrepair. On the Turkish side, trains run as far south to İslahiye, about 22 km (14 mi) north of the Syrian border. While the tracks south of İslahiye to the border are maintained, no scheduled trains currently run on them.

The Adana-Aleppo railway was built by the Baghdad Railway and mostly constructed between 1908 and 1912, with the 4.9 km (3.0 mi) long Ayran Tunnel completed in 1917. Together with the Konya-Yenice railway the route played a crucial role during World War I, transporting men and materiel to the fronts in Mesopotamia and Palestine. After the war and subsequent peace treaties, the railway was split between Turkey and Syria.

As part of the Mersin-Adana-Gaziantep high-speed railway corridor, the Adana-Aleppo railway is being expanded to two-tracks and upgraded to accommodate speeds of 160 km/h (99 mph) to 200 km/h (120 mph).
