= Gaziray =

Commuter rail system in Gaziantep, Turkey

- A train of E39000 cars at Başpınar station in October 2026

Overview
- Status: Operating
- Owner: Turkish State Railways
- Locale: Gaziantep, Turkey
- Termini: Başpınar; Taşlıca
- Stations: 17

Service
- Type: Commuter rail
- Services: 2 Başpınar – Taşlıca; Taşlıca – Başpınar
- Operator(s): TCDD Taşımacılık and GAZİULAŞ
- Depot: Taşlıca

History
- Opened: November 5, 2022

Technical
- Line length: 25 km (16 mi)
- Num of tracks: 3
- Track gauge: 1,435 mm (4 ft 8 1/2 in) standard gauge
- Electrification: 25 kV, 50 Hz AC overhead line
- Operating speed: 120 km/h (75 mph) (Max)

Gaziray is a commuter rail line serving Gaziantep, Turkey. Being 25 kilometres (16 mi) long, the line is the fourth commuter rail system in the country, after İZBAN, Marmaray, and Başkentray. The system is also a part of major upgrades along the Mersin-Adana-Osmaniye-Gaziantep railway corridor.

== Background ==
Gaziray is a joint venture between the Turkish State Railways and the Gaziantep Metropolitan Municipality to expand the existing right-of-way from a single-track route to a triple-track route, with segregated train traffic, as well as constructing new stations and renovating existing ones. A new 4.8 km (3.0 mi) tunnel, located west of Gaziantep station, is also included within the project. Construction began in March 2016 and was expected to be completed towards the end of 2018, however as of June 2019 the project is 85% complete. Test running on the line started in September 2022. The line started operating on November 5, 2022.

Similar to many other rail-transport systems in Turkey, the name Gaziray is a portmanteau of Gazi from Gaziantep and ray, which is the Turkish word for rail.

== Stations ==
There are a total of sixteen stations on the 25.532 km (15.865 mi) long Gaziray line, two of which are underground, all of which are suitable for disabled access.

Rank	Station	Connection	Class	Notes
1	Başpınar		Level	Gaziantep Organized Industrial Zone
2	OSB-3		Level	Gaziantep Organized Industrial Zone
3	OSB-4		Level	Gaziantep Organized Industrial Zone
4	Dülük		Level	Dolice (Dülük) Ancient City
5	Stadyum		Level	Kalyon Stadium
6	Beylerbeyi		Level	
7	Fıstıklık	Gaziantep Intercity Bus Terminal	Level	
8	Selimiye		Level	Kayaönü
9	Adliye		Underground	Gaziantep Courthouse, Şehitkamil State Hospital, TEDAŞ
10	Topraklık		Underground	
11	Mücahitler		Level	Dr. Ersin Arslan Training and Research Hospital, SANKO University Hospital, NCR International Hospital
12	Gaziantep Railway Station (Gar)	Gaziantep Tramway:	Level	Zeugma Mosaic Museum
13	Göllüce		Level	İnayet Topçuoğlu Hospital
14	Seyrantepe		Level	Küsget Industrial Zone
15	Mustafa Yavuz		Level	Küsget Industrial Zone
16	Taşlıca		Level	Oduncular Industrial Zone

== Rolling stock ==
=== TCDD E23000 ===
Upon the line's opening in 2022, four E23000 class electric multiple units, manufactured by Hyundai Rotem, were put into service. These trains, taken from the Başkentray suburban rail network in Ankara, were introduced as a temporary solution to work the line until the delivery of the E39000 class trains ordered for the line in 2021 was completed.

=== TCDD E39000 ===
In January 2021, eight four-car E39000 class trainsets were ordered from local manufacturer Türasaş for operation on the line. The first set was completed and presented in March 2025. As of November 2025, four sets have been delivered and are in use on the line.
