= Gaziantep railway station =

Railway station in Gaziantep, Turkey

GAZİANTEP
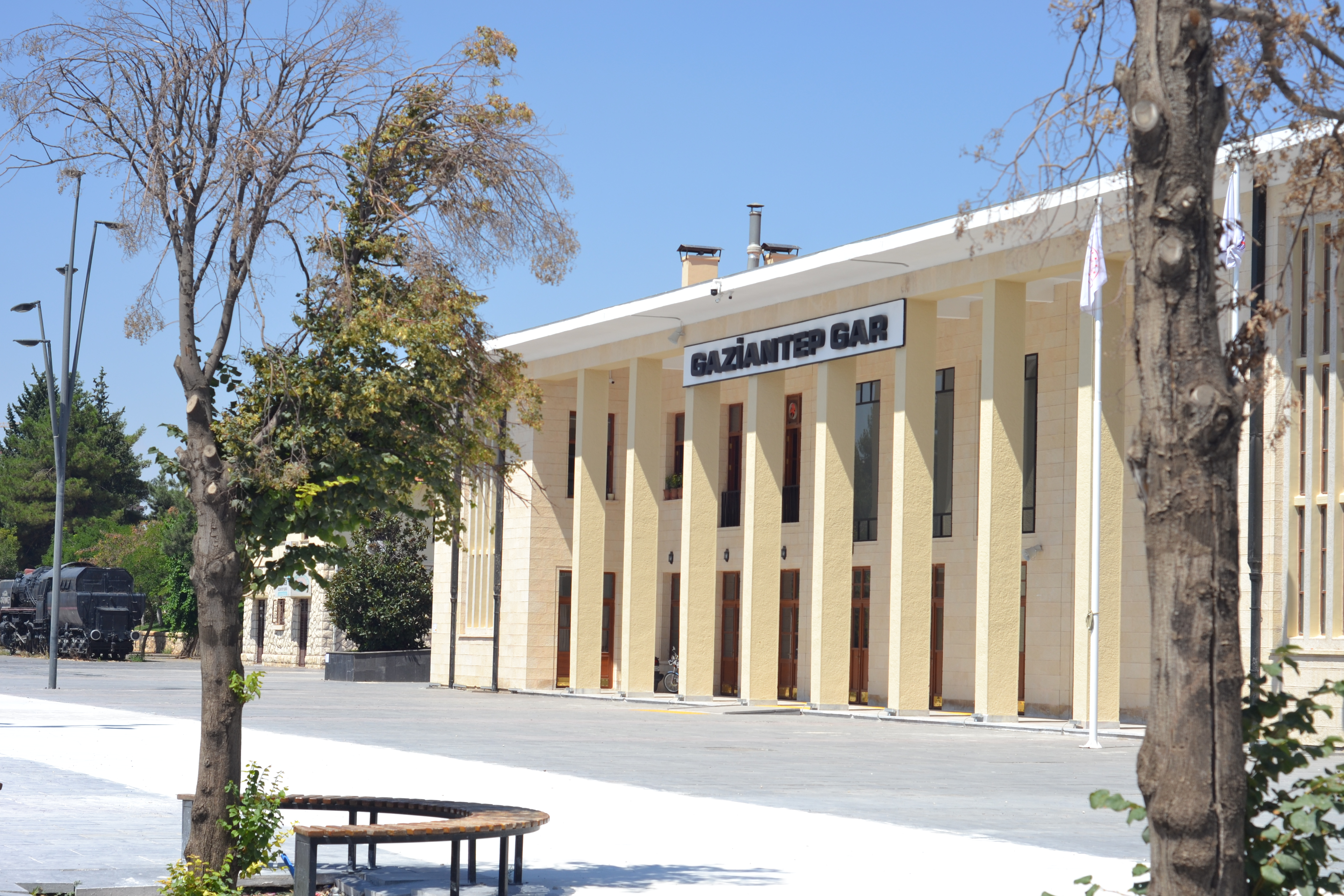
- Gaziantep train station

General information
- Location: İstasyon Meydanı, Yaprak Mah. 27080; Şehitkamil, Gaziantep; Turkey
- Coordinates: 39.9169°N 32.9517°E
- Owner: Turkish State Railways
- Operator: TCDD Taşımacılık
- Platforms: 3 (1 side platform, 2 island platforms)
- Tracks: 5

Construction
- Structure type: At-Grade
- Parking: Yes

History
- Opened: 1953
- Rebuilt: 2017-18 (Platforms)

Services
Preceding station	TCDD Taşımacılık	Following station
Commuter service
Mücahitler towards Başpınar	Gaziray	Göllüce towards Oduncular
Location

Gaziantep Railway Station is a station in Gaziantep, Turkey. The station was built in 1953 to provide Turkish State Railways service to the city of Gaziantep.

The station will serve as the terminus of the Mersin to Gaziantep High Speed Rail Project being constructed by 2024. The project will connect the southern Turkish cities of Mersin, Adana, Osmaniye and Gaziantep.

The station is located in the heart of Gaziantep, at the intersection of Zafer and İstasyon Streets. İstasyon Street was built as, and continues to be, a major axis in central Gaziantep, lined with trees and home to a number of important public buildings.

== History ==
Compared to other cities in Turkey, the railway reached Gaziantep relatively late. A national railway plan in 1938 planned rail connections to Adana and Urfa, but bypassed Gaziantep. Part of the reason was probably because of its mountainous surroundings. Until the 1950s, the closest railway station to Gaziantep was in Narlı, 55 km away. Passengers heading to Gaziantep would disembark at Narlı and then travel the remaining distance by bus or private car, which would take about 5 hours. Ülkü Tamer wrote that people making the drive from Narlı to Gaziantep would stop in Başpınar to eat kebab and drink tea; this practice came to an end when the Gaziantep station opened.

Construction on Gaziantep station began in 1951. The main architect is apparently not known, but the initial contractor was Muammer Bozok and the work was later completed by the civil engineer Şahap Sicimoğlu. The station's official opening ceremony was held on 27 October 1953, and the prime minister Adnan Menderes was in attendance.

The station building was completed in 1959 and the Narlı-Gaziantep line was continued to Karkamış, where it connected to the former Baghdad Railway. The station became a major hub in the southeast, with trains to Baghdad, Adana, Aleppo and Malatya. Services to Aleppo and Baghdad have since ended.

Only one train came to Gaziantep when the station was first built, and its arrival was a big event for locals. People would flock to the station to have picnics and barbecues and see the train; according to Tamer, the railway station square came to replace Kavaklık at Alleben Creek as the city's main picnic spot. Eventually, however, the novelty wore off.

The train station is served by the Gaziantep Tram. Connection to the Gaziantep Tram system was completed in 2012.

== Architecture ==
Gaziantep station's "assertive", monumental colonnaded façade belongs to the second national architectural movement, which was in vogue at the time of its construction. The building's exterior is made of keymıh stone (hard limestone), while the interior features havara (soft limestone). The ceiling is made of glass, which was a new architectural technique in the 1950s.

The building has two stories plus a basement. The main hall, on the ground floor, is 8 meters tall and covers both stories. In the hall are the passenger lounge, the ticket counter, a kitchen, a cold storage room and other storage areas, restrooms, a baggage claim office, a post office, and administrative offices. The train platforms are on the upper level, which is divided into two parts that are separated by the main entrance hall. One side was built with a telegraph office and other administrative offices; the other side was built with a post office, police station, restaurant, and restrooms. The building has two staircases, at the eastern and western ends. The western staircase only connects the ground and upper floors, while the eastern staircase connects the ground, upper, and basement levels. The basement was built with a boiler room, ash removal room, coal cellar, workers' room, restrooms, and storage areas.
