= Körfez Ulaştırma =

Railway company

Körfez Ulaştırma A.Ş.
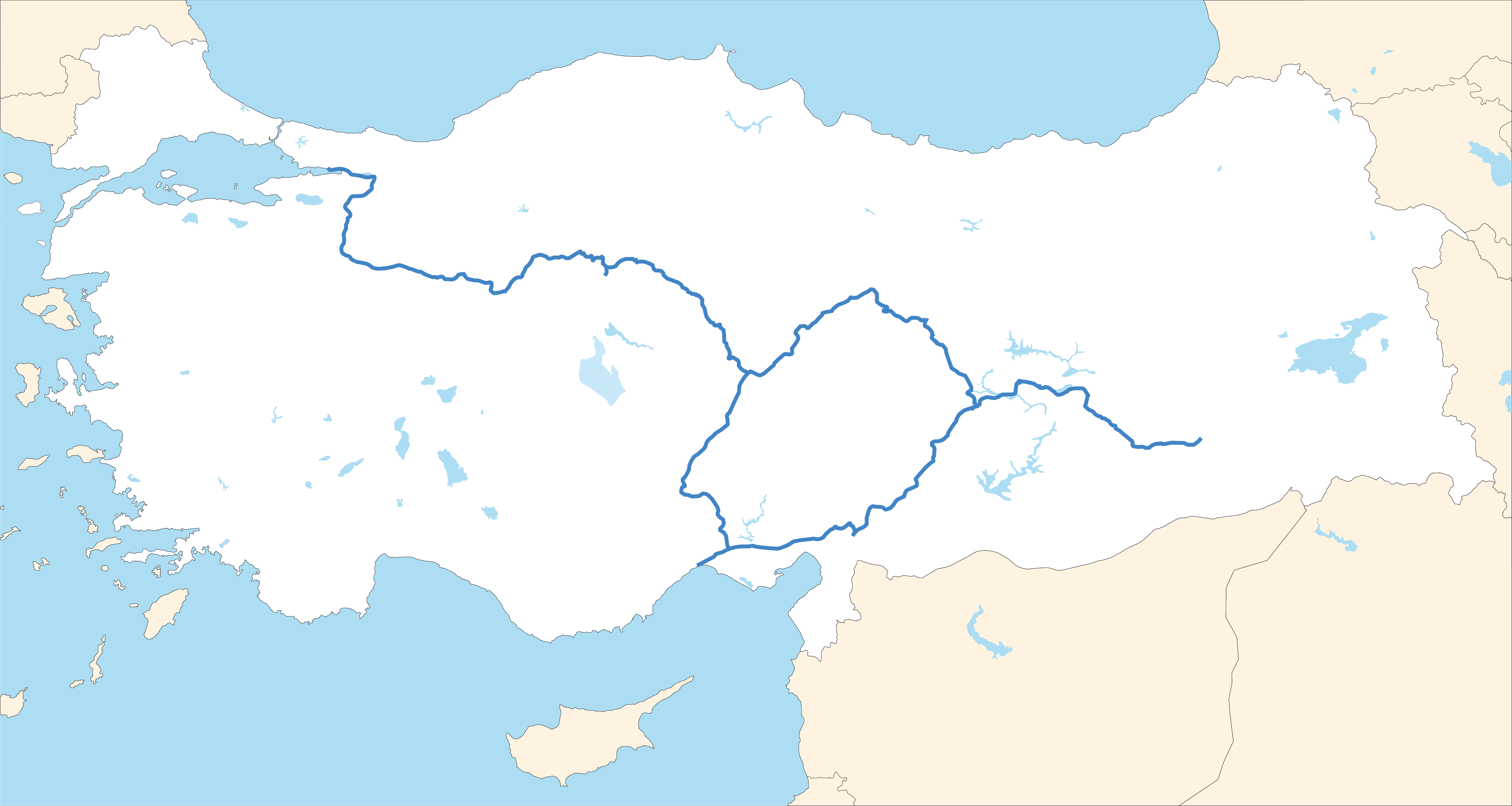
- KUAS route map as of July 2021.

Overview
- Fleet: 5 DE36000 diesel locomotives 7 HB83000; 519 Tank cars 35 Flat wagons
- Parent company: Tüpraş
- Headquarters: Istanbul, Turkey
- Reporting mark: KUAS
- Locale: Anatolia
- Dates of operation: 2017–

Technical
- Track gauge: 1,435 mm (4 ft 8 1/2 in) standard gauge
- Length: 2,616 km (1,626 mi)

Other
- Website: Körfez Ulaştırma

Körfez Ulaştırma A.Ş. is an open access railway company operating freight rail service between Körfez, Kocaeli and Kırıkkale in Turkey. The railway carries liquid fuel between the refineries in Körfez and Hacılar (just south of Kırıkkale) on tracks owned by the Turkish State Railways. Körfez Ulaştırma is a wholly owned subsidiary of Tüpraş, the largest liquid-fuel producer in Turkey.

The company ordered 7 diesel/electric hybrid locomotives from Stadler in 2019 and received them in 2021.
