= Şatırhüyük, Nurdağı =

Village in Gaziantep Province, Turkey

Şatırhüyük
- Neighbourhood
- Location in Turkey
- Coordinates: 37°13′11″N 36°58′33″E
- Country: Turkey
- Province: Gaziantep
- District: Nurdağı
- Population (2022): 2,828
- Time zone: UTC+3 (TRT)

Şatırhüyük is a neighbourhood of the municipality and district of Nurdağı, Gaziantep Province, Turkey. Its population is 2,828 (2022). Before the 2013 reorganisation, it was a town (belde). It is inhabited by Alevi Turks and Sunni Kurds.
