= İbrahimli =

İbrahimli is a surname. The surname is derived from the male given name İbrahim (related to Abraham).

== People with the surname ==
- Ismayil Ibrahimli, Azerbaijani footballer, attacking midfielder of Qarabağ FK and the Azerbaijan U21.

== Other ==
- İbrahimli, Mut, a small village in Mut district of Mersin Province, Turkey
- İbrahimli, Kastamonu, a village in the District of Kastamonu, Kastamonu Province, Turkey
