= Amanian Gate =

Mountain pass in Turkey

- Bahçe Pass
- Location within Turkey

- Traversed by: O-52 / E90

Third Approach
- Location: Osmaniye Province, Turkey
- Range: Amanus Mountains
- Coordinates: 37°11′2″N 36°33′23″E

The Amanian Gate (Latin: Amani Portae) or Bahçe Pass (Turkish: Bahçe Geçidi), also known as the Amanus Pass or Amanides Pylae (Ἀμανίδες or Ἀμανικαί Πύλαι 'Amanus Gates'), is a mountain pass located on the border between Osmaniye and Gaziantep provinces in south-central Turkey. The pass provides a way through the northern Amanus Mountains (modern Nur Mountains), connecting Cilicia to southern Anatolia and northern Syria. It is one of two passes through the Amanus, the other being the Syrian Gate to the south.

The Amanian Gate was mentioned in the ancient Nabonidus Chronicle.

== The Amanian Gate and the Battle of Issus ==
The pass played an important role leading to the Battle of Issus. The Persian army advanced through the Amanic Gate or another nearby pass, coming behind the Macedonian army which turned back to face and defeat the Persian army. The exact Persian strategy remains in dispute. According to Jona Lendering, after a part of Alexander the Great's army occupied the Syrian Gate, Darius III of Persia decided to lead his army north through the Amanian Gate and place his army between the two Macedonian armies at the town of Issus. However, the Macedonians joined forces before the arrival of Darius, and the outcome was Persian defeat. However, Donald Engels rejects a similar interpretation.

== The Amanian Gate, the Mardaites, and the Fortifications ==
According to some historians, after the conquest of the Levant by the Arab Caliphate, the Mardaites, Christians following either Miaphysitism or Monothelitism, gained a semi-independent status around the Amanus Mountains within the Byzantine-Arab border region. They initially agreed to serve as spies for the Arabs and to guard the Amanian Gate, but their loyalty was intermittent and they often sided with the Byzantines instead. Because of the numerous late antique and medieval fortifications built north of the Belen Pass on established west-to-east routes through the Amanus Mountains, there is some confusion about the location of “the” Amanian Gate. The most likely candidate is just south of the modern Bahçe, which is guarded by the castle of Sarvandikar, built in the 11th and 12th centuries during the period of the Armenian Kingdom of Cilicia. To the south other fortresses guarding five separate Amanus passes between Cilicia Pedias and the Syria-to-Maraş highway include: Hasanbeyli, Karafrenk, Çardak, Kozcağız, Mitisin, and Mancılık. Just to the north of Bahçe on a road of considerable antiquity is the Arab fortress of Haruniye (the modern Düziçi), built in the late 8th century and later occupied by the Armenians and the Teutonic Knights.
