= İbrahimli, Mut =

İbrahimli
- Neighbourhood
- Location in Turkey
- Coordinates: 36°42′N 33°39′E
- Country: Turkey
- Province: Mersin
- District: Mut
- Elevation: 1,010 m (3,310 ft)
- Population (2022): 71
- Time zone: UTC+3 (TRT)
- Postal code: 33600
- Area code: 0324

İbrahimli is a neighbourhood in the municipality and district of Mut, Mersin Province, Turkey. Its population is 71 (2022). The village is situated in the Toros Mountains. The main economic activity is agriculture and animal husbandry.
