= Fevzipaşa =

Settlement in Turkey

- Neighbourhood
- Location in Turkey
- Coordinates: 37°06′N 36°38′E
- Country: Turkey
- Province: Gaziantep
- District: İslahiye
- Elevation: 500 m (1,600 ft)
- Population (2022): 1,173
- Time zone: UTC+3 (TRT)
- Postal code: 27800
- Area code: 0342

Fevzipaşa is a neighbourhood of the municipality and district of İslahiye, Gaziantep Province, Turkey. Its population is 1,173 (2022). Before the 2013 reorganisation, it was a town (belde). It is inhabited by Yörüks.

== Geography ==
Fevzipaşa is 10 km (6.2 mi) north of İslahiye. The highway distance to Gaziantep to the east is 82 km (51 mi). The Nur Mountains are just to the west of the town and the meadow-lands of Amik are to the east. Although the average altitude of the plains is about 500 m (1,600 ft), the altitude of the mountainous area west of Fevzipaşa is higher than 1,000 m (3,300 ft). The road from Fevzipaşa to the west is very steep and crooked, therefore usually the longer road to the north which connects Adana to Gaziantep is preferred.

== Economy ==
Agriculture is one of the main activities. The town is also known as a railroad town, because of the position of the town on the railroad junction. The railroad from west (via one of the longest tunnels of Turkish railroads) merge with the line traverses Amik plains from north to south, down to Damascus, the Syrian capital. Fevzipaşa railroad station is an important station and many Fevzipaşa residents make their living as railroad employees.
