= Nurdağı =

District in Gaziantep, Turkey

- District and municipality
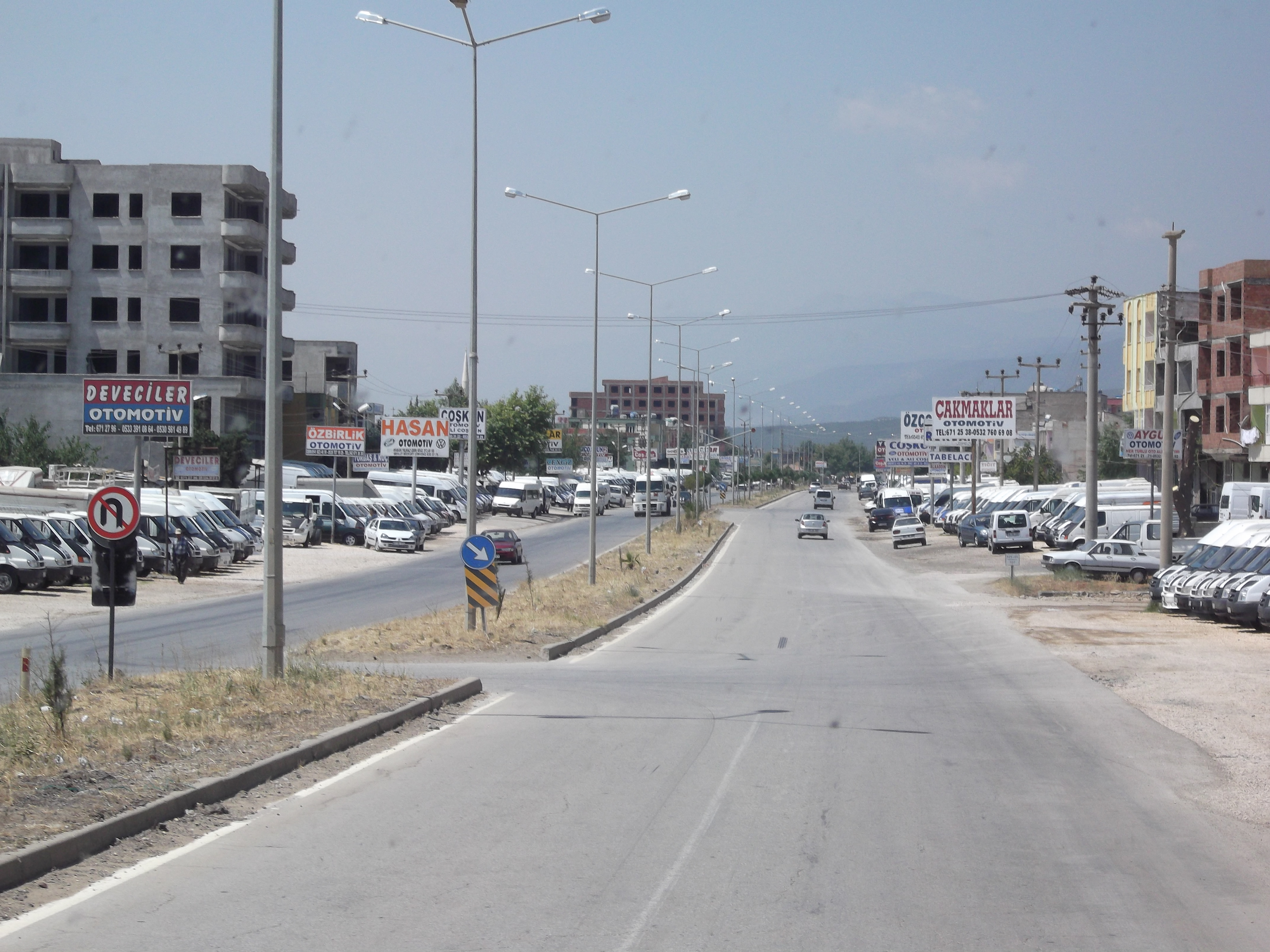

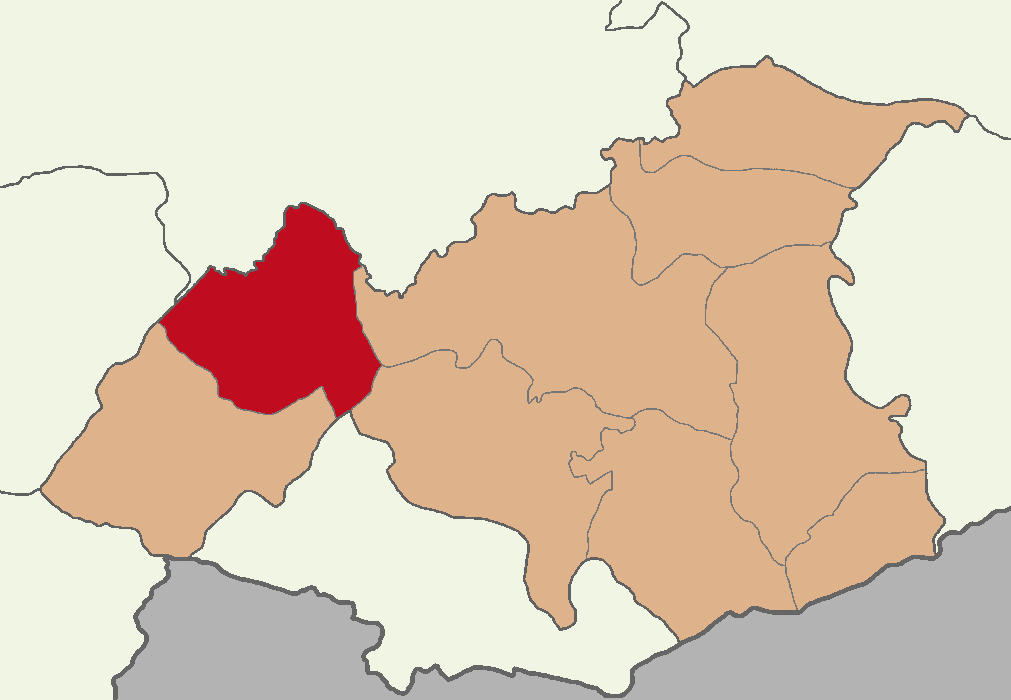
- Map showing Nurdağı District in Gaziantep Province

- Location within Turkey
- Coordinates: 37°10′44″N 36°44′23″E
- Country: Turkey
- Province: Gaziantep

Government
  - Mayor: Yakup Bahar (AKP)
- Area: 697 km^{2} (269 sq mi)
- Population (2022): 41,322
  - Density: 59.3/km^{2} (154/sq mi)
- Time zone: UTC+3 (TRT)
- Postal code: 27840
- Area code: 0342
- Website: www.nurdagi.bel.tr

Nurdağı (pronounced [nuɾˈdaˈɯ]) is a municipality and district of Gaziantep Province, Turkey. Its area is 697 km^{2}, and its population is 41,322 (2022). Nurdağı is 45 kilometres (28 mi) west of the city of Gaziantep.

A magnitude 7.8 earthquake struck 6 kilometres (3.7 mi) from Nurdağı on 6 February 2023, causing widespread devastation in the district and around 2,500 deaths. Mass graves were created to bury the overwhelming number of dead in the area.

== Composition ==
There are 48 neighbourhoods in Nurdağı District:

- Alpaslan Türkeş
- Altınova
- Aslanlı
- Ataköy
- Atatürk
- Atmalı
- Bademli
- Bahçelievler
- Balıkalan
- Başpınar
- Belpınar
- Çakmak
- Demirler
- Durmuşlar
- Emirler
- Esenyurt
- Fatih
- Gedikli
- Gökçedere
- Gözlühüyük
- Hamidiye
- Hisar
- İçerisu
- İkizkuyu
- İncegedik
- İncirli
- Karaburçlu
- Kartal
- Kırışkal
- Kırkpınar
- Kömürler
- Kurudere
- Kuzoluk
- M.Akif Ersoy
- Mesthüyük
- Naimler
- Nogaylar
- Olucak
- Sakçagözü
- Şatırhüyük
- Sayburun
- Tandırlı
- Terken
- Torunlar
- Tüllüce
- Yavuz Selim
- Yaylacık
- Yeni
