= Nur Mountains =

Mountain range in Turkey

Coordinates: 36°45′N 36°20′E

- Alma-Dağ, Amanos Mountains
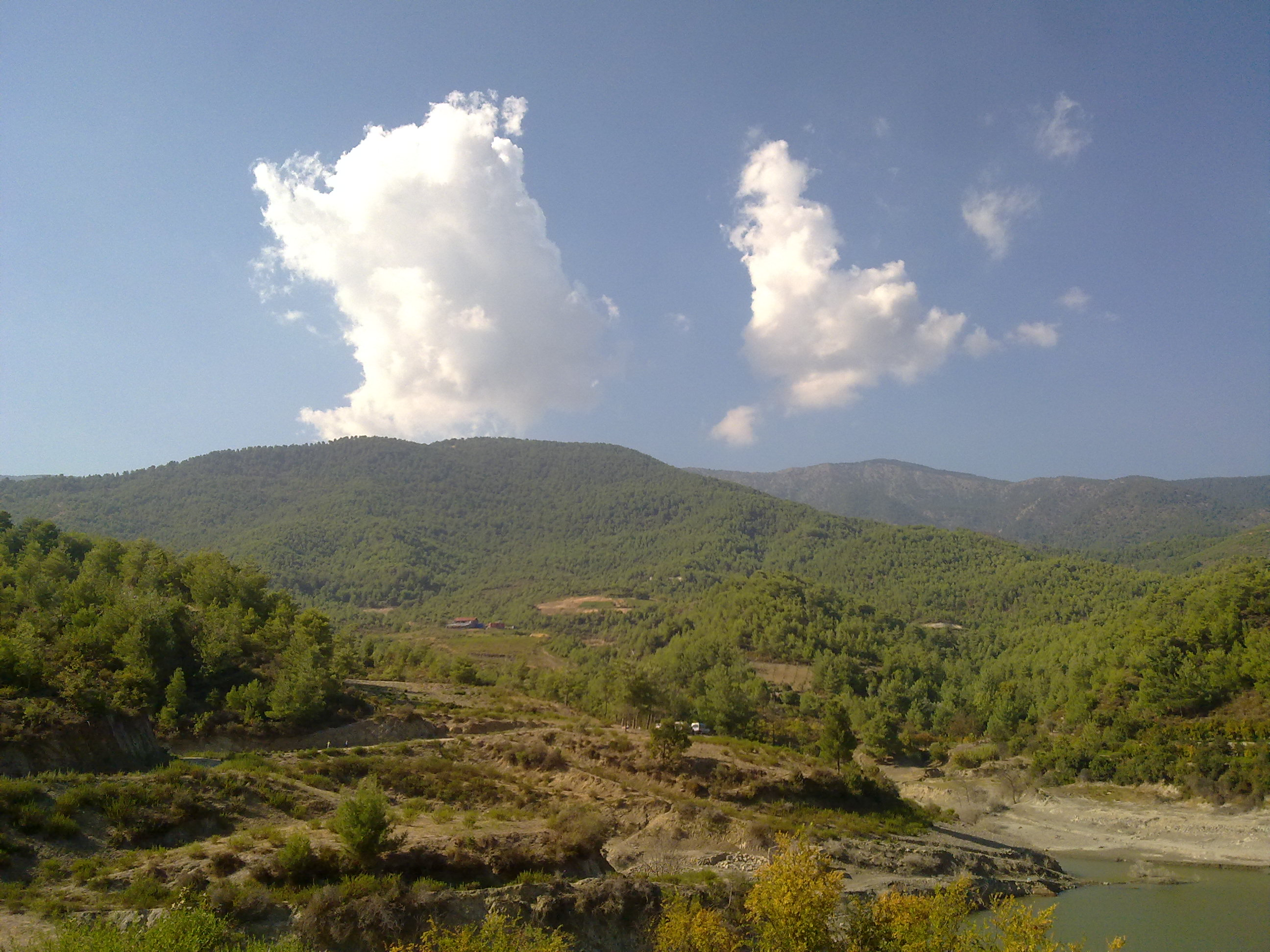

Highest point
- Peak: Bozdağ Dağı
- Elevation: 2,240 m (7,350 ft)

Naming
- Native name: Nur Dağları (Turkish)

Geography
- Location within Turkey
- Country: Turkey
- Province: Hatay

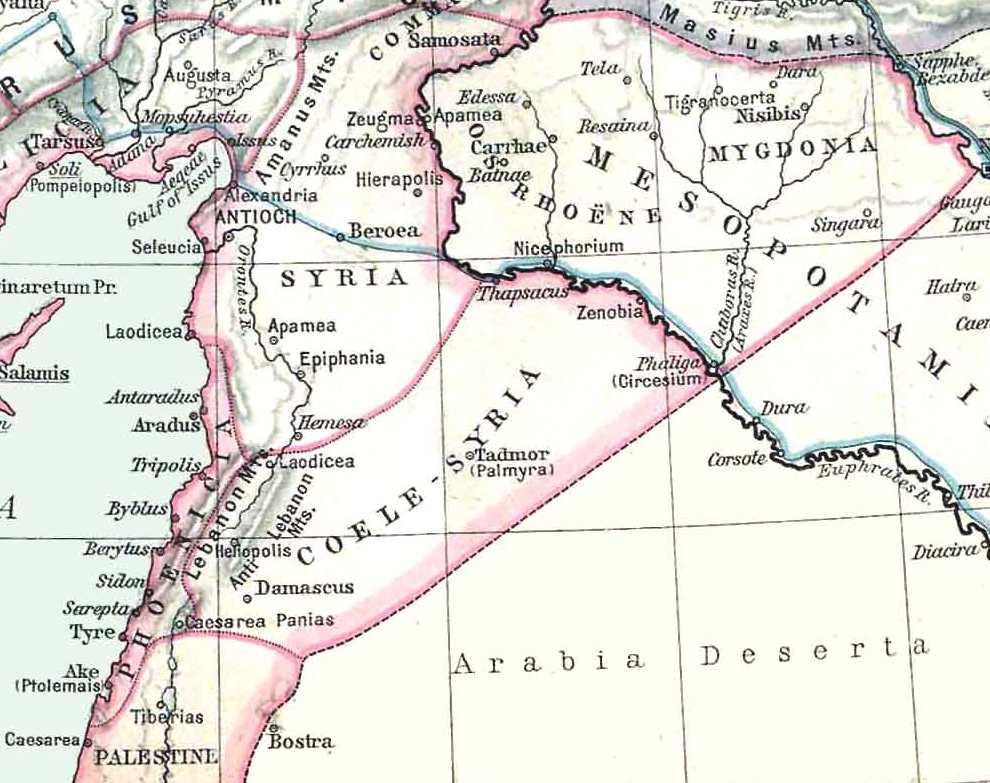
Amanus Mountains (old name of today's Nur Mountains), southern part was between the Gulf of Issus and Antioch

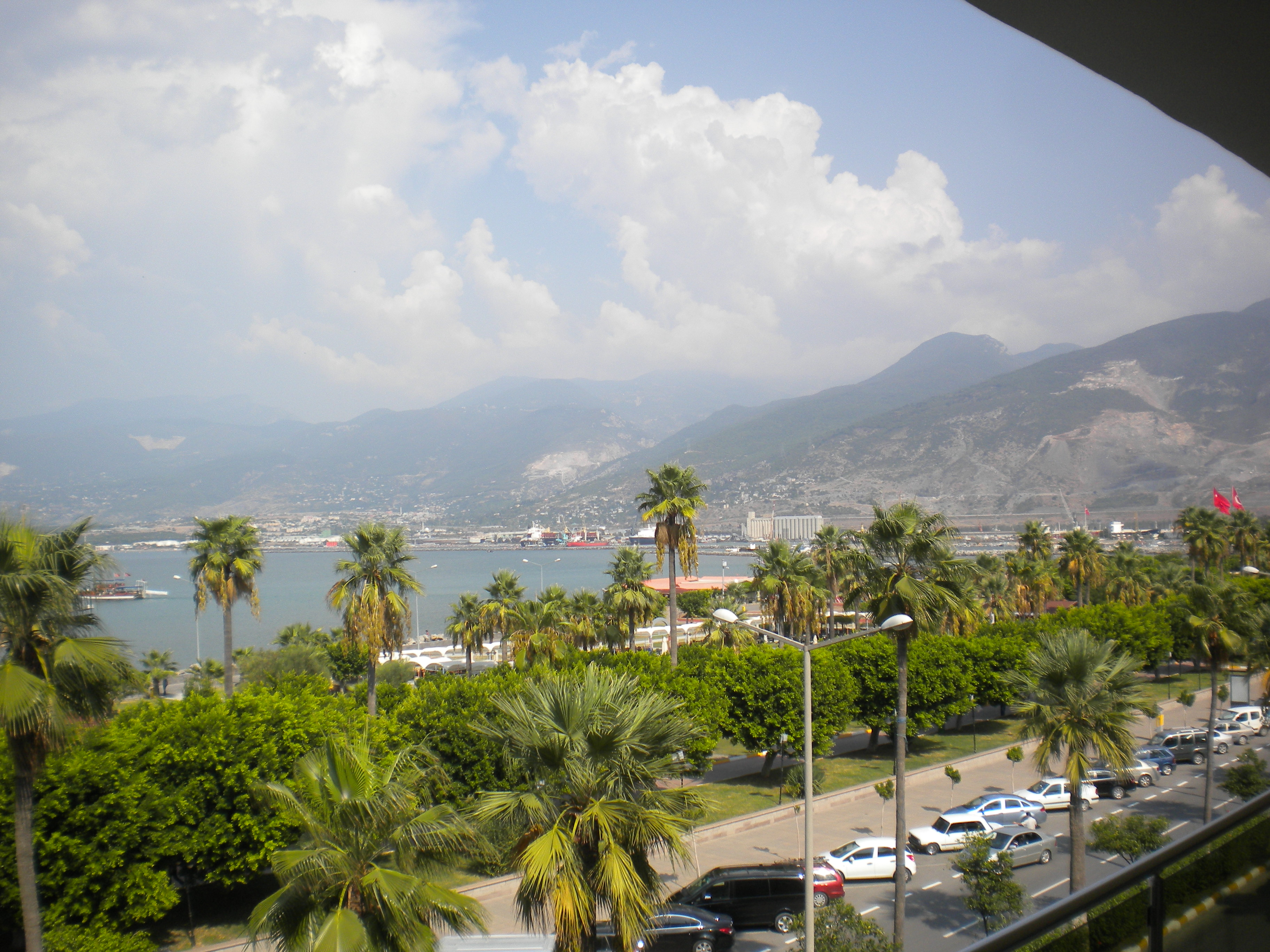
Promenade of İskenderun (old name: Alexandria of Cilicia) seeing the Nur Mountains (old name: Amanus) in the background.

The Nur Mountains (Turkish: Nur Dağları, "Mountains of Holy Light"), formerly known as Alma-Dağ, the ancient Mount Amanus (Ancient Greek: Ἄμανος), medieval Black Mountain, or Jabal al-Lukkam in Arabic, is a mountain range in the Hatay Province of south-central Turkey. It begins south of the Taurus Mountains and the Ceyhan river, runs roughly parallel to the Gulf of İskenderun, and ends on the Mediterranean coast between the Gulf of İskenderun and the Orontes (Asi) river mouth.

== Geography ==
The range is around 100 miles (200 kilometers) in length and reaches a maximum elevation of 2,240 m (7,350 ft). It divides the coastal region of Cilicia from Antioch and inland Syria, making a natural border between Asia Minor (Anatolia) in the southeast region and the rest of West Asia. Its highest peak is Bozdağ Dağı. A major pass through the mountains known as the Belen Pass (Syrian Gates) is located near the town of Belen, and another pass known as the Amanic Gates (Bahçe Pass) lies farther north.

== Biodiversity ==
The Amanos Mountains, located in southern Turkey, are recognized as one of the world’s biodiversity hotspots and one of Turkey's 9 environmental hotspots. This pristine region features typical Mediterranean flora and is home to numerous endemic species. Its rich ecosystems contribute significantly to the ecological diversity of Turkey, making it a vital area for conservation efforts.

== Monasticism in the Black Mountain ==
The specific term "Mount Amanus" is referred to by ancient writers. In the Middle Ages, it was called the Black Mountain in Byzantine Greek, Armenian, Syriac and Latin. While monks had been leading a solitary life in the mountains since the fourth century, it was during the 10th and 11th century that the area became a major monastic hub for Byzantine monasticism, in its importance for the Byzantine East comparable to the influence of Athos in the Byzantine West. There were numerous Armenian, Melkite, Jacobite, Georgian, and Catholic monasteries and hermits in the mountains. On account of this, it was called Gâvur Dağ (Mount of Infidels) by the Turks. In 1028, the Emperor Romanos III, disturbed by the number of "heretical" (i.e., Syriac and Armenian) monks in the Black Mountain, tried to draft them for his campaign against Aleppo. In the 1050s the famous physician Ibn Butlan, who later would himself become a monk in Antioch, was impressed by the general health of monasticism in the region and especially of the monastery of St Simeon the Younger. In 1066, the monasteries were devastated by the Seljuk Turkish general Afshin Bey who killed many monks. In 1098, the monks gave provisions to the Crusader army besieging Antioch. The monasteries were plundered again after the Battle of Ager Sanguinis in 1119 and many monks were slain by the Artuqids of Aleppo.

== See also ==
- Nikon of the Black Mountain
