= List of rulers of Parthian sub-kingdoms =

The Parthian Empire ruled over an area roughly corresponding to present-day Iran from the third century BC to the third century AD. It contained a varying number of subordinate semi-autonomous kingdoms each with its own ruler.

== Lists of rulers ==
=== Arsacids of Armenia 12–428 AD ===
- Vonones 12–16 (Former king of Parthia as Vonones I)
- Orodes 16–18 (Son of Artabanus III king of Parthia)
- Artaxias III 18–35 (From the house of Polemon)
- Arsaces I 35 (Son of Artabanus III king of Parthia)
- Orodes 35 (Again)
- Mithridates I 35–37 (Son of Mithridates (IV) king of Iberia)
- Orodes 37–42 (Again)
- Mithridates I 42–52 (Again)
- Rhadamistus 52–54 (Son of Pharasmanes (III) king of Iberia)
- Tiridates I 54–60 (Son of Vonones II king of Parthia & Medes)
- Tigranes VI 60–62 (From the house of Herod)
- Tiridates I 62–c. 75 (Again)
- Unknown king c. 75–89 (Probably Vologases II of Parthia)
- Sanatruces I 89–109 (Son of Vologases I of Parthia)
- Axidares (Ashkhadar) 110–113 (Son of Pacorus II king of Parthia)
- Parthamasiris (Partamasir) 113–114 (Son of Pacorus II king of Parthia)
  - Roman occupation 114–115
- Mithridates II 114–116 (Brother of Sanatruces I & Osroes I king of Parthia)
- Sanatruces II 116 (Son of Mithridates II)
- Vologases I from 116 (Son of Sanatruces I)
- ?Achaemenes until 138/144
- Sohaemus 138/144–161 (Son of Achaemenes)
- Pacorus I 161–164 (Aurelius Pacorus)
- Sohaemus 164–178 (Again)
- Vologases II 178–197
- Unknown king 197–215
- Khosrov I 215–216 (Son of Vologases II)
  - Roman occupation 216–217
- Tiridates II 217–222
- ?Khosrov (II) 222–238
- ?Tiridates (III) 238–253
  - Sasanian occupation 253–279
- Hormozd-Ardashir 253–270 (Later king of Iran as Hormizd I son of Shapur I Sassanid)
- Narseh 270–293 (Later king of Iran as Narseh son of Shapur I Sassanid)
- Artavasdes VI c. 260
- Khosrov II 279–287
- Tiridates (IV) 287–298
- Tiridates III 298–330
- Pacorus II 330 (Usurper)
- Khosrov III 330–338
- Tigranes VII 338–351
- Arsaces II (Arshak II) 351–367
- Papas (Pap) 367–374
- Varasdates (Varazdat) 374–378
- Vologases III 378–386 (Co-ruler with Arsaces III (Arshak III))
- Arsaces III 378–389 (Co-ruler with Vologases III then Khosrov IV)
- Khosrov IV 386–392 (Co-ruler with Arsaces III & then alone)
- Vramshapuh 392–414
- Khosrov IV 414–416 (Again)
- Tigranes VIII 416 co-ruler with Arsaces IV
- Arsaces IV 416 co-ruler with Tigranes VIII
- Shapur 416–420 (Later king of Iran as Shapur IV son of Yazdegerd I Sassanid)
- Artaxias IV 422–428

=== Arsacids of Media 144 BC – 232 AD ===
- Vologases (Bagasha) 144–122 BC
- Arsaces 122–111
- Artaxerxes 111–97
- Artabanus 97–88
- Mithridates 88–67
- Darius 67–65
- Mithridates 65–55
- Orodes 55–50
- Pacorus 50–38
- ?Tiridates c. 30–25
- ?Mithridates 12–9 BC
- ?Orodes c. 4–6 AD
- Artabanus 9–12 AD
  - ...
- Vonones c. 45–51
- Pacorus 51–75 son of Vonones
  - ...
- Arsaces c. 136 AD
- ?Pacorus to 163 AD
  - ...
- Vologases to 208
  - ...
- Artabanus 213–226
- Pacorus from 226 AD son of Artabanus

=== Arsacid kings of Iberia 123 BC – c. 230 AD ===
Ruler	Year
Rev I	189 to 216
Vache	216 to 234
Bacurius I	234 to 249
Mithridates II	249 to 265
Amazaspus III	260 to 265
Aspacures I	265 to 284

=== Arsacids of Caucasian Albania 123 BC – c. 490 AD ===
- Vachagan I the Brave
- Vache I
- Urnayr
- Vachagan II
- Mirhavan
- Satoy
- Asay
- Aswagen
- Vache II
- Vachagan III the Pious

=== Arsacids of Hyrcania c. 170 BC – c. 230 AD ===
- Arsaces c. 165 BC son of Phraates I
- Himerus to 129 BC
- Otanes c. 70 BC
- Artabanus c. 9–40 AD
- Gotarzes 40–51 AD

=== Indo-Parthians c. 20 –c. 240 AD ===
==== Indo-Parthian rulers of Sistan (Drangiana) ====
- Gondophares I Great king of kings, Autocrator (c. 20 BC – first years AD)
- Gondophares II Gadana Orthagnes (c. 20 AD – 30 AD?), brother of Gondophares I
- Gondophares III Sases (mid-1st century AD)
- Gondophares IV Gadana Obouzanes, son of Orthagnes
- Sanabares Great King, son of Ubouzanes
- Abdagases II King, son of Sanabares
- Pacores (late 1st century AD)
- ? Tiridates (No coins), son of Sanabares
- ? Atursasan (No coins), son of Tiridates
- Farn-Sasan, son of Atursasan

==== Indo-Parthian rulers of Arachosia (Kandahar) ====
- Gondophares I Great king of kings, Autocrator (c. 20 BC – first years AD)
- Sarpedones Basileontos (first years AD – c. 20 AD)
- Gondophares II Gadana Orthagnes Basileontos (c. 20 AD – 30 AD?)
- Abdagases I, nephew of Gondophares I (first years AD – mid-1st century AD)
- Sarpedones Great king of kings, Dikaios, Soter, Nikiphoros
- Gondophares III Sases (mid-1st century AD)
- Sanabares Great King, Soter
- Abdagases II King
- Pacores (late 1st century AD)

==== Indo-Parthian rulers of Jammu ====
- Gondophares I (c. 20 BC – first years AD)
- Abdagases I (first years AD – mid-1st century AD)
- Sarpedones
- Gondophares III Sases (mid-1st century AD)
- Gondophares IV Gadana Obouzanes
- Gondophares III Sases (mid-1st century AD)

==== Indo-Parthian rulers of Indus shore (Balochistan) ====
- Sarpedones
- Satavastra
- Gondophares III Sases (mid-1st century AD)

==== Indo-Parthian rulers of Gandhara ====
- Gondophares I (c. 20 BC – first years AD)
- Abdagases I Basileontos (first years AD – mid-1st century AD)
- Abdagases I Great king, king of kings (first years AD – mid-1st century AD)
- Gondophares III Sases (mid-1st century AD)

==== Indo-Parthian rulers of Taxila ====
- Abdagases I (first years AD – mid-1st century AD)
- Gondophares III Sases (mid-1st century AD)

==== Indo-Parthian rulers of North Arachosia (Bagram) ====
- Gondophares I Great king of kings, Autocrator, Soter (c. 20 BC – first years AD)
- Abdagases I Great king, Soter (first years AD – mid-1st century AD)

=== Kings of Merv & Abarshahr c. 10–c. 250 AD ===
- ? cont. with Phraates V
- ? cont. with Artabanus II
- ? cont. with Gotarzes II and Vardanes I
- D ... c. 50 AD
- Po ... cont. with Vologases I
- Sanabares c. 2nd half of the 1st century AD
- Pacores c. 100 AD
- ? cont. with Vologases III and Mithridates IV
- ? cont. with Vologases III and Mithridates IV
- Tiren cont. with Vologases IV
- ? cont. with Vologases IV
- Ardashir c. 200 AD
- ? 1st half of the 3rd century
- ? 1st half of the 3rd century
- ? c. 250 AD

=== Kings of Persis c. 230 BC – c. 210 AD ===
Name		Date	Family Relations	Note
1	Vahbarz I	beg. of 3rd century BC	?	leader of a revolution against Seleucids (?)
2	Baykard	?	Fratarakā dynasty	
3	Baydād (bgdt)	end of 3rd/ beg. of 2nd century BC	Fratarakā dynasty – son of Baykard	sub-Seleucid
4	Ardaxšīr I (rtḥštry)	1st half of 2nd century	Fratarakā dynasty	sub-Seleucid
5	Vahbarz II (whwbrz – called Oborzos in Polyenus 7.40)	1st half of 2nd century	Fratarakā dynasty	
6	Vādfradād I (wtprdt)	mid-3nd century BC	Fratarakā dynasty – son of Vahbarz	Vadfradad I and his successors were as sub-Parthian dynasts.
7	Vadfradad II	c. 140	?	
8	'Unknown king I' (Syknlt?)	2nd half of 2nd century	?	
9	Darev I	end of 2nd century	?	
10	Vadfradad III	1st half of 1st century	?	
11	Darev II	1st century	son of Vadfradad III	
12	Ardashir II	2nd half of 1st century	son of Darev II	killed by his brother Vahshir I
13	Vahshir I	2nd half of 1st century	son of Darev II	
14	Pakor I	1st half of 1st century AD	son of Vahshir I	
15	Pakor II	1st half of 1st century	?	
16	Nambed	mid-1st century	son of Ardashir II	
17	Napad	2nd half of 1st century	son of Nambed	
18	'Unknown king II'	end of 1st century	?	
19	Vadfradad IV	1st half of 2nd century	?	
20	Manchihr I	1st half of 2nd century	?	
21	Ardashir III	1st half of 2nd century	son of Manchihr I	
22	Manchihr II	mid-2nd century	son of Ardashir III	
23	Pakor III	2nd half of 2nd century	?	
24	Manchihr III	2nd half of 2nd century	son of Manchihr II	
25	Ardashir IV	end of 2nd century	son of Manchihr III	
26	Vahshir II	c. 206–210 AD	?	The last of Bazarangids.
27	Shapur	beg. of 3rd century	Brother of the first Sasanian, Ardashir I	
28	Ardashir V	beg. of 3rd century	First Sasanian ruler, under the name of Ardashir I	

=== Rulers of Hatra (2nd century BCE – 2nd century CE) ===
In inscriptions found at Hatra, several rulers are mentioned, while other rulers are sporadically mentioned by classical authors.

They appear with two titles: the earlier rulers are called mry' (translation uncertain, perhaps administrator), the later ones mlk -king – see Kingdom of Hatra.

Name		Title	Date	Family Relations	Note
1	Worod	mry'			
2	Ma’nu	mry'			
3	Elkud	mry'	155/156 AD		
4	Nashrihab	mry'	128/29 – 137/38 AD		
5	Naṣru	mry'	128/29 – 176/77		
6	Wolgash I	mry' and mlk – King			
7	Sanatruq I	mry' and mlk – King	176/177 AD		ruled together with Wolgash I
8	Wolgash (II?)			son of Wolgash (I)	
9	Abdsamiya	mlk – King	192/93 – 201/202 AD		Supported the Roman emperor Pescennius Niger
10	Sanatruq II	mlk – King	207/08 – 229/230 AD		

=== Kings of Elymais c. 147 BC – c. 224 AD ===
- Kamnaskires I Soter (c. 147 BC?)
- Kamnaskires II Nikephoros (c 145–c. 139 BC)
- Okkonapses (c. 139/138–c. 137 BC), rebel
- Tigraios (c. 137–c. 132 bc), rebel
- Darius Soter (c. 129 BC), rebel
- Pittit (125–124 BC), rebel
- Kamnaskires III (c. 82–62/61 BC), co-ruler with Anzaze
- Anzaze (c. 82–62/61 BC), co-ruler with Kamnaskires III
- Kamnaskires IV (1st century BC)
- Kamnaskires V (1st century BC)
- Kamnaskires VI (1st century AD)
- Orodes I (1st century)
- Orodes II, also known as Kamnaskires-Orodes (1st/2nd century)
- Phraates (1st/2nd century)
- Osroes (2nd century)
- Orodes III (2nd century), co-ruler with Ulfan
- Ulfan (2nd century), co-ruler with Orodes III
- Abar-Basi (2nd century)
- Orodes IV (2nd/3rd century)
- Khwasak (3rd century)
- Orodes V (3rd century)

=== Kings of Characene c. 170 BC–c. 222 AD ===
- Hyspaosines c. 127–122/121 BC
- Apodakos c. 110/109–104/103 BC
- Tiraios I 95/94–90/89 BC
- Tiraios II 79/78–49/48 BC
- Artabazos 49/48–48/47 BC
- Attambelos I 47/46–25/24 BC
- Theonesios I c. 19/18 BC
- Attambalos II c. 17/16 BC – AD 8/9
- Abinergaos I 10/11; 22/23
- Orabazes I c. 19
- Attambalos III c. 37/38–44/45
- Theonesios II c. 46/47
- Theonesios III c. 52/53
- Attambalos IV 54/55–64/65
- Attambalos V 64/65–73/74
- Orabazes II c. 73–80
- Pakoros (II) 80–101/02 king of Iran
- Attambalos VI c. 101/02–105/06
- Theonesios IV c. 110/11–112/113
- Attambalos VII 113/14–117
- Meredates c. 131–150/51 son of Pakoros (II) king of Iran
- Orabazes III c. 150/151–165
- Abinergaios II (?) c. 165–180
- Attambalos VIII c. 180–195 (?)
- Maga (?) c. 195–210
- Abinergaos III c. 210–222

=== Kings of Osrhoene 132 BC–c. 293 AD ===
- Aryu (132–127 BC)
- Abdu bar Maz'ur (127–120 BC)
- Fradhasht bar Gebar'u (120–115 BC)
- Bakru I bar Fradhasht (115–112 BC)
- Bakru II bar Bakru (112–94 BC)
- Ma'nu I (94 BC)
- Abgar I Piqa (94–68 BC)
- Abgar II bar Abgar (68–52 BC)
- Ma'nu II (52–34 BC)
- Paqor (34–29 BC)
- Abgar III (29–26 BC)
- Abgar IV Sumaqa (26–23 BC)
- Ma'nu III Saphul (23–4 BC)
- Abgar V Ukkama bar Ma'nu (Abgarus of Edessa) (4 BC–7 AD)
- Ma'nu IV bar Ma'nu (7–13 AD)
- Abgar V Ukkama bar Ma'nu (13–50)
- Ma'nu V bar Abgar (50–57)
- Ma'nu VI bar Abgar (57–71)
- Abgar VI bar Ma'nu (71–91)
- Sanatruk (91–109)
- Abgar VII bar Ezad (109–116)
  - Roman interregnum 116–118
- Yalur (118–122, co-ruler with Parthamaspates)
- Parthamaspates (118–123)
- Ma'nu VII bar Ezad (123–139)
- Ma'nu VIII bar Ma'nu (139–163)
- Wa'il bar Sahru (163–165)
- Ma'nu VIII bar Ma'nu (165–167)
- Abgar VIII (167–177)
- Abgar IX (the great) (177–212)
- Abgar X Severus bar Ma'nu (212–214)
- Abgar (X) Severus Bar Abgar (IX) Rabo (214–216)
- Ma’nu (IX) Bar Abgar (X) Severus (216–242)
- Abgar (XI) Farhat Bar Ma’nu (IX) (242–244)

=== Kings of Adiabene c. 69 BC – c. 310 AD ===
- Abdissares (c. 164 BC)
- Unknown king (c. 69 BC)
- Artaxares (cont. with Augustus)
- Izates I (c. 15 AD)
- Bazeus Monobazus I (20?–30?)
- Heleni (c. 30–58)
- Izates II bar Monobazus (c. 34–58)
  - Vologases (Parthian occupation opposing Izates II) (c. 50)
- Monobazus II bar Monobazus (58 – middle of the 70s)
- Meharaspes (?–116)
  - To the Roman Empire (116–117)
- Atwr ('tlw) (c. 150)
  - To the Sassanid Empire
  - Ardashir II (344–376)

=== Kings of Korduene c. 140 BC – c. 359 AD ===
- Zarbienus; early mid-1st century BC until c. 69 BC. Killed by Tigranes II.
- Manisarus; ~ 115 AD: He took control over parts of Armenia and Mesopotamia, in the time of Trajan.
- Ardashir; ~ 340s AD: He was against the Christianization of Corduene.
- Jovinian ~ 359 AD

=== City-lords of Assur ===
The sequence of local rulers of Assur under the three or four centuries of Parthian suzerainty is poorly known. Only five names are attested and their dates, their precise order and how they relate to each other is not clear. The order used here follows Aggoula (1985). There are large gaps in this sequence.

Name	Timespan	Notes	Ref
Hormoz; Hormoz (or Hormez?)	Uncertain	Iranian name. Known from an inscription on a statue.	
Hayyay; Rāʾeḥat Hayyay	Uncertain	Arabic name. Mentioned in an inscription.	
Hanni; Ḥannī	Uncertain	Akkadian-derived Aramaic name. Mentioned as the father of a person (whose name is illegible) in a relief.	
Rʻuth-Assor; Rʿūṯʾassor	2nd century AD	Akkadian-derived Aramaic name. Mentioned in inscriptions and in his own stele.	
[unknown name]	2nd century AD	Indirectly mentioned in an inscription by his nephews, though his name is not preserved.	
Nbudayyan; Nḇūḏayyān	2nd century AD	Akkadian-derived Aramaic name. Mentioned in multiple inscriptions.	

== Bibliography ==
- Aggoula, Basile (1985). Inscriptions et Graffites Araméens d'Assour (in French). Naples: Instituto Universitario Orientale. OCLC 609738626.
- Baratin, Charlotte, "Les provinces orientales de l’empire parthe", Thèse de doctorat en Langues, histoire et civilisations des mondes anciens, Université Lumière Lyon2, 2009, V. Entre Parthes et Kushans.
- Beyer, Klaus (1998). Die aramäischen Inschriften aus Assur, Hatra und dem übrigen Ostmesopotamien (in German). Göttingen: Vandenhoeck & Ruprecht. ISBN 3-525-53645-3.
- Beyer, Klaus (2013). "Die aramäischen Inschriften aus Assur, Hatra und dem übrigen Ostmesopotamien (datiert 44 v. Chr. bis 238 n. Chr.): Nachträge". Die Welt des Orients (in German). 43 (1): 25–62. doi:10.13109/wdor.2013.43.1.25. JSTOR 23608128.
- Fröhlich, C. Indo-Parthian Dynasty. Encyclopædia Iranica, Vol. Xiii, Fasc. 1: 100–103, 2004.
- Josephus Flavius, Antiquities of the Jews.
- Pakzadian, Hasan. "The Coins of Elymais", Tehran, 2007. (in Persian)
- Qashqai, Hamidreza, "The successors of Mithridates II", Bulletin of Ancient Iranian History (UCLA), vol. 5, March 2009.(in Persian)
- Qashqai, Hamidreza. "Indo-Parthian descendants in the Sasanian era", 2017.
- Radner, Karen (2015). Ancient Assyria: A Very Short Introduction. Oxford University Press. ISBN 978-0198715900.
- The Cambridge History of Iran (CHI), vol. 3(I), THE SELEUCID, PARTHIAN AND SASANIAN PERIODS, Cambridge University Press, 1983.
- The Cambridge History of Iran (CHI), vol. 3(II), THE SELEUCID, PARTHIAN AND SASANIAN PERIODS, Cambridge University Press, 1983.
- Wiesehöfer, Josef, "ANCIENT PERSIA from 550 BC to 650 AD", tr. by Azizeh Azodi, I.B.Tauris Publishers, London, 1996.
- www.parthia.com
