= Attambelos =

Attambelos may refer to the following kings of the Parthian vassal state of Characene:

- Attambelos I, reigned between 47/46 and 25/24 BC
- Attambelos II, ruled from 17/16 v. to 8/9 AD
- Attambelos III, ruled from approximately 37/38 to 44/45 AD; his rule is known only by the coins he minted
- Attambelos IV, ruled from 54/55 to 64/65; his rule is known only by the coins he minted
- Attambelos V, ruled from 64/65 to 73/74; his rule is known only by the coins he minted
- Attambelos VI, ruled from approximately 101/02 to 105/06; his rule is known only by the coins he minted
- Attambelos VII, Characene king who surrendered to the Roman Emperor Trajan in 116 AD following two years of fighting
- Attambelos VIII, who may have been king of Characene c. 180–195 AD; known with certainty only from the coins of his son of maga, who calls himself son of a King Attambelos

== See also ==
- Kings of Characene
