= List of state leaders in the 2nd century =

This is a list of state leaders in the 2nd century (101–200) AD.

== Africa ==
=== Africa: East ===
- Kingdom of Aksum (complete list) –

- Zoskales, King (c.100)

=== Africa: Northeast ===
- Kingdom of Kush (complete list) –

- Tamelerdeamani, King (2nd century)
- Adeqatali, King (2nd century)
- Takideamani, King (2nd century)
- Tarekeniwal, King (2nd century)
- Amanikhalika, King (2nd century)
- Aritenyesbokhe, King (2nd century)
- Amanikhareqerem, King (2nd century)

== Americas ==
=== Americas: Mesoamerica ===
Maya civilization

- Tikal (complete list) –

- Foliated Jaguar, Ajaw (2nd–3rd century)

== Asia ==
=== Asia: Central ===
Mongolia

- Xianbei state –

- Cizhiqian, Chieftain (121–132)
- Tanshihuai, Chieftain (156–181)
- Helian, Chieftain (181–185)
- Kuitou, Chieftain (185–187)
- Budugen, Chieftain (187–234)

=== Asia: East ===
China

- Eastern Han, China (complete list) –

- He, Emperor (89–105)
- Shang, Emperor (106)
- An, Emperor (106–125)
- Marquess of Beixiang, Marquess (125)
- Shun, Emperor (125–144)
- Chong, Emperor (144–145)
- Zhi, Emperor (145–146)
- Huan, Emperor (146–168)
- Ling, Emperor (168–189)
- Liu Bian, Emperor (189)
- Xian, Emperor (189–220)

Japan

- Yamatai –

- Himiko, Queen (189-248)

Korea

- Baekje (complete list) –

- Giru, King (77–128)
- Gaeru, King (128–166)
- Chogo, King (166–214)

- Geumgwan Gaya (complete list) –

- Geodeung, King (199–259)

- Goguryeo (complete list) –

- Taejodae, King (53–146)
- Chadae, King (146–165)
- Sindae, King (165–179)
- Gogukcheon, King (179–197)
- Sansang, King (197–227)

- Silla (complete list) –

- Pasa, King (80–112)
- Jima, King (112–134)
- Ilseong, King (134–154)
- Adalla, King (154–184)
- Beolhyu, King (184–196)
- Naehae, King (196–230)

=== Asia: Southeast ===
Cambodia

- Funan –

- Hùntián, King (1st/2nd century)
- Hùnpánkuàng, King (2nd century)
- Pánpán, King (late 2nd century)

Indonesia: Java

- Jawadwipa –

- Diao bian, King (fl.132)

- Salakanagara –

- Dewawarman I, King (130–mid 2nd century)
- Dewawarman II, King (late 2nd century)
- Dewawarman III, King (2nd–3rd century)

Vietnam

- Jiaozhi
  - Chu Xưởng (before 136 - 137), provincial governor
  - Phàn Diễn (137), Jiaozhi governor
  - Giả Xương (137), Rinan governor
  - Trương Kiều (138 - ?), Jiaozhou's governor
  - Chúc Lương (before 138 - ?), Jiuzhen's governor
  - Hạ Phương (before 144 - ?; 160 - ?), Jiaozhi governor
  - Lưu Tảo (144 - ?), Jiaozhi governor
  - Ni Shi (Vietnamese: Nghê Thức) (? - 157)
- Champa (complete list) –

- Khu Liên, King (192–mid 3rd century)

=== Asia: South ===
India

- Chera dynasty (complete list) –

- Uthiyan Cheralathan, King (c.105–130)
- Nedum Cheralathan, King (c.130–188)
- Cenkuttuvan, King (c.188–244)

- Kushan Empire (complete list) –

- Vima Kadphises, Ruler/Emperor (c.95–c.127)
- Kanishka the Great, Ruler/Emperor (127–c.140)
- Vāsishka, Ruler/Emperor (c.140–c.160)
- Huvishka, Ruler/Emperor (c.160–c.190)
- Vasudeva I, Ruler/Emperor (c.190–230s)

- Nagas of Padmavati (complete list) –

- Vrisha-naga, Naga (late 2nd century)
- Bhima-naga, Naga (c.210–230)

- Satavahana dynasty (Purana-based chronology) –

- Shivasvati, King (78–106)
- Gautamiputra Satkarni, King (106–130)
- Vasisthiputra/ Pulumavi III, King (130–158)
- Shiva Sri Satakarni, King (158–165)
- Shivaskanda Satakarni, King (165–172)
- Sri Yajna Satakarni, King (172–201)

- Northern Satraps (complete list) –

- Kharapallana, Great Satrap (c.130)
- Vanaspara, Satrap (c.130)

- Western Satraps (complete list) –

- Bhumaka, Satrap (?–119)
- Nahapana, Satrap (119–124)
- Chastana, Satrap (c.78–130)
- Jayadaman, Satrap (c.130)
- Rudradaman I, Satrap (c.130–150)
- Damajadasri I, Satrap (170–175)
- Jivadaman, Satrap (178–181, 197–199)
- Rudrasimha I, Satrap (180–188, 191–197)
- Satyadaman, Satrap (197–198)
- Jivadaman, Satrap (197–199)
- Rudrasena I, Satrap (200–222)

Pakistan

- Indo-Parthian Kingdom (complete list) –

- Pacores, King (100–135)
- Sanabares, King (135–160)

- Paratarajas (complete list) –

- Yolamira, Raja (c.125–150)
- Bagamira, Raja (c.150)
- Arjuna, Raja (c.150–160)
- Hvaramira, Raja (c.160–175)
- Mirahvara, Raja (c.175–185)
- Miratakhma, Raja (c.185–200)

Sri Lanka

- Anuradhapura Kingdom (complete list) –

- Vasabha, King (66–110)
- Vankanasika Tissa, King (110–113)
- Gajabahu I, King (113–135)
- Mahallaka Naga, King (135–141)
- Bhatika Tissa, King (141–165)
- Kanittha Tissa, King (165–193)
- Cula Naga, King (193–195)
- Kuda Naga, King (195–196)
- Siri Naga I, King (196–215)

=== Asia: West ===
- Corduene (complete list) –

- Manisarus, King (c.115)

- Judea –

- Simon bar Kokhba, Nasi, Prince (132–135)

- Nabataean kingdom (complete list) –

- Rabbel II Soter, King (70/71 to 106)

- Osroene (complete list) –

- Sanatruk, client King under Rome (91–109)
- Abgar VII bar Ezad, client King under Rome (109–116)
- Roman interregnum (116–118)
- Yalur, Co-ruler, client King under Rome (118–122)
- Parthamaspates, Co-ruler, client King under Rome (118–123)
- Ma'nu VII bar Ezad, client King under Rome (123–139)
- |Ma'nu VIII bar Ma'nu, client King under Rome (139–163)
- Wa'il bar Sahru, client King under Rome (163–165)
- Ma'nu VIII bar Ma'nu (165–167)
- Abgar VIII, client King under Rome (167–177)
- Abgar IX, client King under Rome (177–212)

- Parthian Empire (complete list) –

- Pacorus II, Great King, Shah (78–105)
- Vologases III, Great King, Shah (105–147)
- Osroes I, Great King, Shah (109–116)
- Parthamaspates, Great King, Shah (116–117)
- Sanatruces II, client King under Rome (116–117)
- Osroes I, Great King, Shah (117–129)
- Vologases III, Great King, Shah (129–140)
- Mithridates IV, Great King, Shah (129–140)
- Vologases IV, Great King, Shah (147–191)
- Osroes II, Great King, Shah (191)
- Vologases V, Great King, Shah (191–208)

- Adiabene (complete list) –

- Meharaspes, client King under Parthia (?–116)
- Narsai, client King under Parthia (170–200)
- Narsai of Adiabene, client King under Parthia (c.191–200)

- Characene (complete list) –

- Pakoros II, client King under Parthia (80–101/02)
- Attambelos VI, client King under Parthia (c.101/02–105/06)
- Theonesios IV, client King under Parthia (c.110/11–112/113)
- Attambelos VII, client King under Parthia (113/14–117)
- Meredates, client King under Parthia (c.131–150/51)
- Orabazes II, client King under Parthia (c.150/51–165)
- Abinergaios II, client King under Parthia (c.165–180)
- Attambelos VIII, client King under Parthia (c.180–195)
- Maga, client King under Parthia (c.195–210)
- Abinergaos III, client King under Parthia (c.210–222)

- Elymais (complete list) –

- Orodes III, client King under Parthia (c.90–c.100)
- Kamnaskires-Orodes, client King under Parthia (c.100–c.120)
- Ariobarzanes, client King under Parthia (c.125)
- Osroes, client King under Parthia (c.125–c.130)
- Unknown client King under Parthia I, client King under Parthia (c.130–c.140)
- Orodes IV, client King under Parthia (c.140–c.160)
- Abarbasi, client King under Parthia (c.160–c.170)
- Orodes V, client King under Parthia (c.170–c.180)
- Vologases, client King under Parthia (c.180–c.190)
- Unknown client King under Parthia (c.190–c.210)

== Europe ==
=== Europe: Balkans ===
- Dacia (complete list) –

- Decebalus, King (87–106)

=== Europe: Central ===
- Marcomanni –

- Ballomar, King (166–178)

=== Europe: East ===
- Bosporan Kingdom (complete list) –

- Sauromates I, client king under Rome (93–123)
- Cotys II, client king under Rome (123–131)
- Rhoemetalces, client king under Rome (131–153)
- Eupator, client king under Rome (154–170)
- Sauromates II, client king under Rome (172–210)

=== Europe: Southcentral ===
- Roman Empire (complete list) –

- Trajan, Emperor (98– 117)
- Hadrian, Emperor (117–138)
- Antoninus Pius, Emperor (138–161)
- Lucius Verus, Emperor (161–169)
- Marcus Aurelius, Emperor (161–180)
- Commodus, Emperor (177–192)
- Pertinax, Emperor (193)
- Didius Julianus, Emperor (193)
- Septimius Severus, Emperor (193–211)
- Caracalla, Emperor (198–217)

- See also: List of Roman consuls#2nd century

=== Eurasia: Caucasus ===
- Armenia: Arsacid dynasty (complete list) –

- Sanatruk, King (88–110)
- Axidares, client King under Rome (110–113)
- Parthamasiris, client King under Rome (113–114)
- Interregnum under Rome
- Vologases I, client King under Rome (117/8–144)
- Sohaemus, client King under Rome (144–161, 163/4–186?)
- Bakur, client King under Rome (161–164)
- Vologases II, client King under Rome (186–198)
- Khosrov I, client King under Rome (198–217)

- Kingdom of Iberia (Kartli) (complete list) –

- Mihrdat I, King (58–106)
- Amazasp I, King (106–116)
- Pharasmanes II, the Valiant, King (117–132)
- Ghadam, King (132–135)
- Pharasmanes III, King (138–161)
- Amazasp II, King (185–189)
- Rev I, the Just, King (189–216)

- Lazica (complete list) –

- Malassas, vassal King under Rome (c. 130)
- Pacorus client King under Rome (138–161)

== See also ==
- List of political entities in the 2nd century
