= Thalassia =

Thalassia may refer to:

- Thalassia, Greece, a village in northern Greece
- Thalassia (plant), a genus of seagrass commonly known as "turtle grass"
- Thalassia (queen), a queen of Characene

== See also ==
- Thalassa (disambiguation)
