= Abinergaos I =

1st-century AD king of Characene

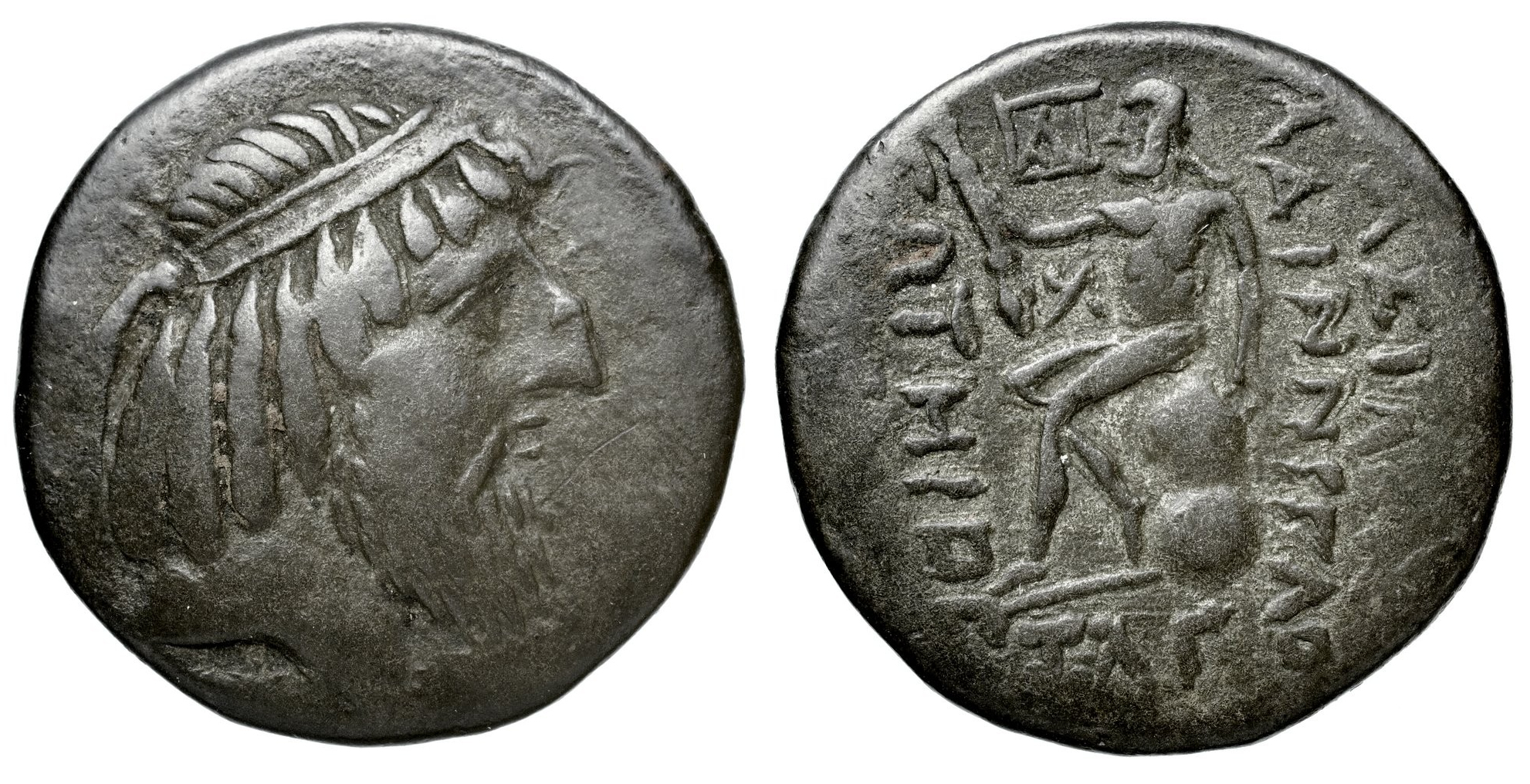
Coin of Abinergaos I.

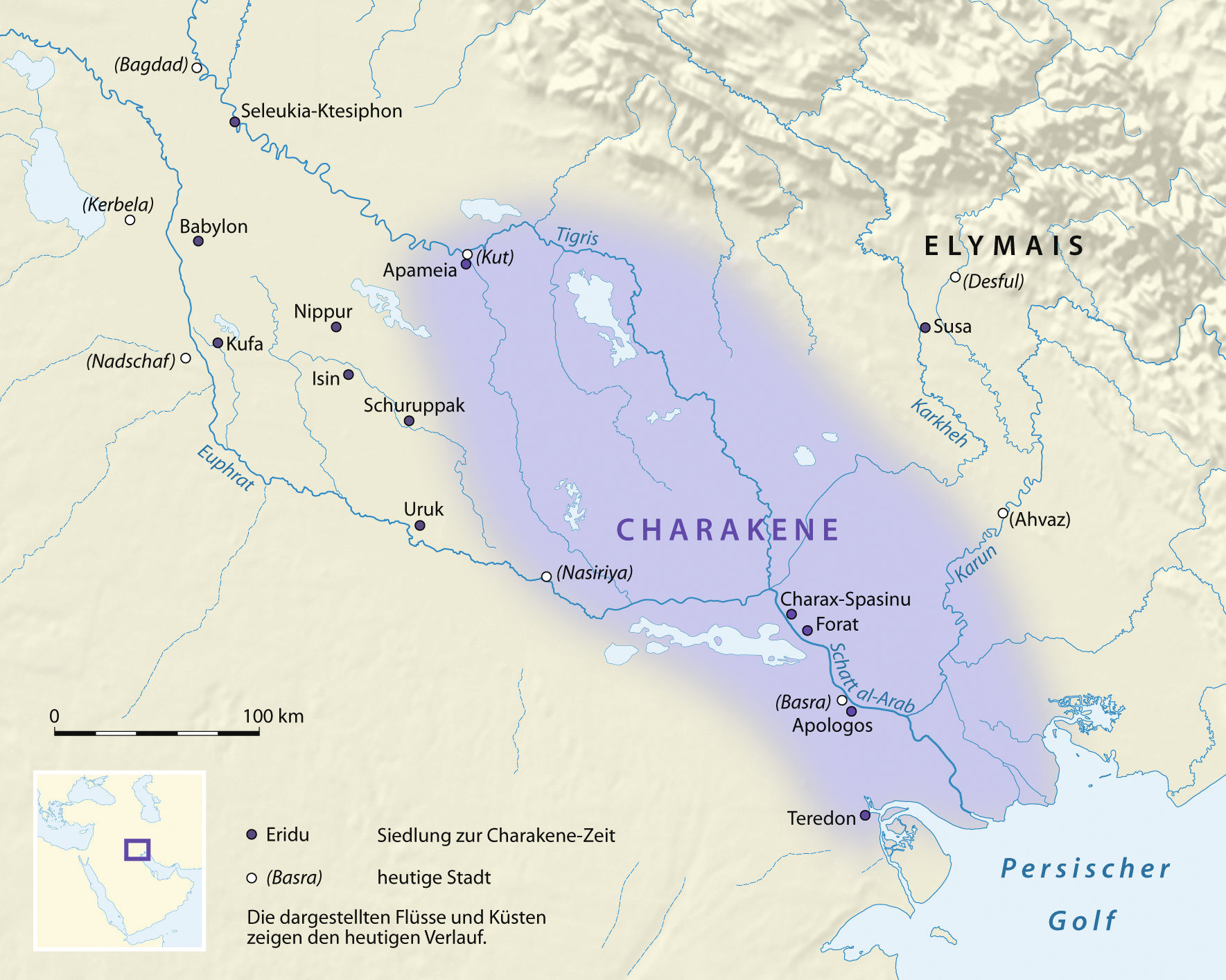
Characene Kingdom.

Abinergaos I, also known as Abinerglus, was the king of Characene starting in the second decade of the Christian era.

The years of his reign are not known beyond a few coins. The coins are dated to the years AD 10/11, 11/12, 13/14 and 22/23.

When the Cambridge History of Iran (CHI) was published in 1983, the sequence of Kings between the first Attambelos and a last Theonesios IV in 113 CE, was apparently believed not to contain any other names except for Abbinerigos (spelling of CHI author David Sellwood). The CHI passage is

There now ensues a succession of monarchs named Theonesios ... or Attambelos ... up to about 113 CE. ... Because of many gaps in the dates known, it is unrealistic to assign regnal numbers. Only one Prince of another name occurs -- Abinerglos or Adinerglos (ABINH...) -- reigning during the second decade of the Christian era and probably to be identified with the Abbinerigos mentioned by Josephus [Antiquities 20.2.2].

But this can be updated in a few ways.

Firstly, other than Theonesios ... or Attambelos, there are now quite a few names additional and beyond Abinerglos in the list of Characene Kings.

Next, about identification with the Charax King in Josephus, there are two problems. First, is that the Josephan passage AJ 20.2.2 is cited here in possibly confusing ways. The actual passage in Josephus English (Whiston) section 20.2.1 corresponds to Greek (Niese) section 20.22-23, but the spelling in the latter transliterates in English to Avenneirigos that is, not supporting any of the above spellings. Of course, numismatic evidence is far more to be trusted than secondary historical sources, even ancient ones like Josephus.

Secondly, the Josephan narrative beginning at Niese 20.17 begins with About this time just after having identified the reign of Claudius in Niese 20.15. Therefore, the Josephan passage is literary evidence for the existence of the Charax King Avenneirigos during Claudius' reign between 41 and 54 CE. This is not however consistent with the current list of Characene Kings, so further investigations must be undertaken, starting with Schuol (2000) op cit (the English translation of the German eagerly awaited).

Religious titles
Preceded by Attambalos II	King of Characene; 10/11BC- 22/23AD	Succeeded by Orabazes I
