= Theonesios III =

1st century AD king of Characene

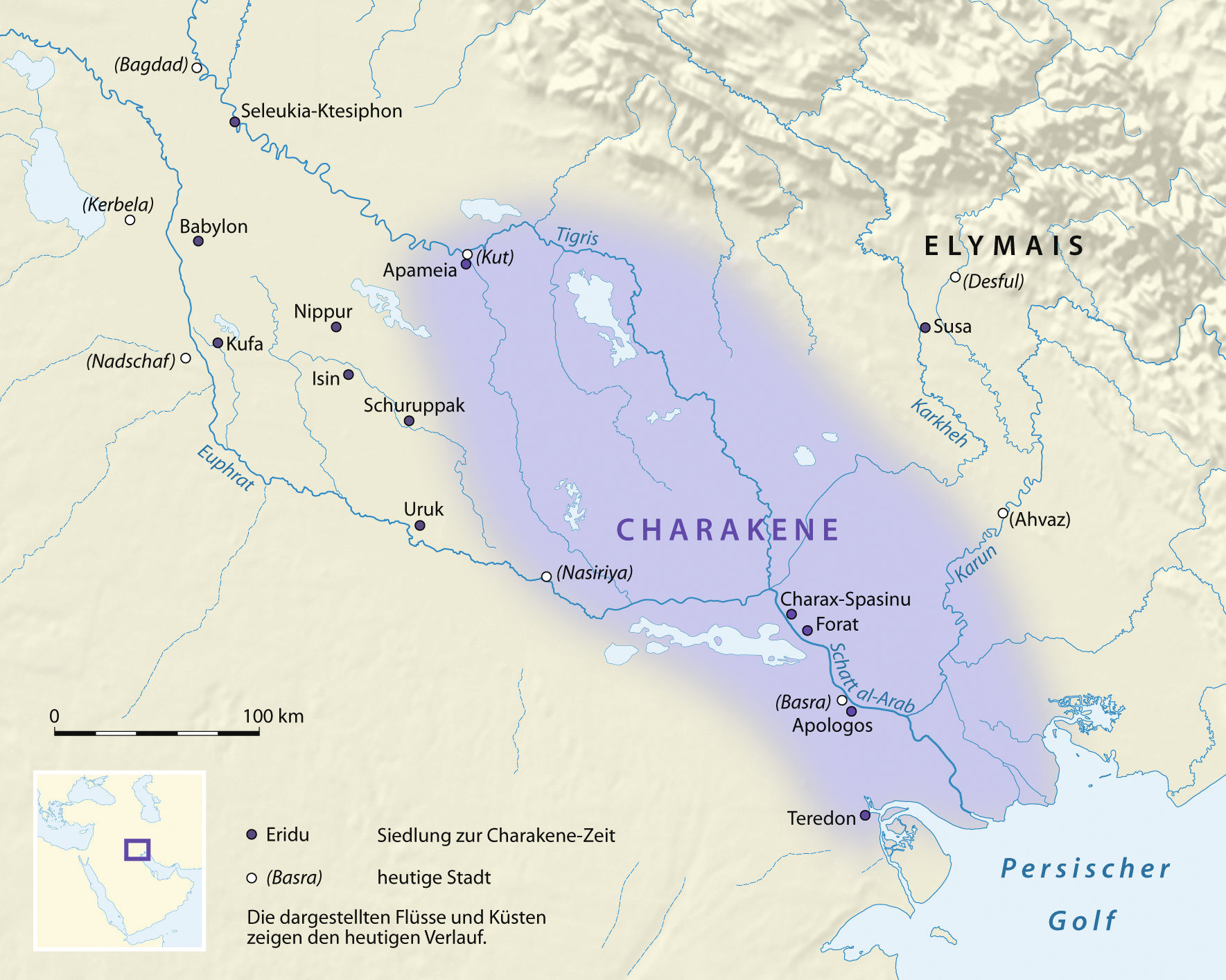
Characene Kingdom.

Theonesios III of Characene was a king of Characene who ruled from approximately 52AD. His rule is known only by the coins he minted.

The distribution of his coinage through the region indicates his rule was one of extensive trade.

He was succeeded by Attambelos IV.

Religious titles
Preceded by Theonesios II	King of Characene; 52AD	Succeeded by Attambelos IV
