= Thalasso =

Thalasso may refer to

- Thalasso (film)
- Arthur Thalasso (1883–1954), American actor

== See also ==
- Thalassa (disambiguation)
