= Thalassa (disambiguation) =

Thalassa is a personification of the sea in Greek mythology.

Thalassa may also refer to:

- Thalassa (band), a band which represented Greece at the Eurovision Song Contest 1998
- Thalassa (beetle), a genus of ladybug
- Thalassa (moon), a moon of the planet Neptune
- Thalassa (TV series), a French documentary programme
- French ship Thalassa (1995), a ship of the Ifremer
- A fictional planet in Arthur C. Clarke's novel The Songs of Distant Earth
- A character from the Star Trek original series episode "Return to Tomorrow"
- Thalassa Gramarye, a fictional musician in the video game Apollo Justice: Ace Attorney

== See also ==
- Thalassia (disambiguation)
- Thalasso (disambiguation)
- Thalassocracy
- Thalassotherapy
- Panthalassa
- Thalatta! Thalatta!
