= Hippokrates Autokrator Nikephoros =

Middle Eastern king

Hippokrates Autokrator Nikephoros was a king with a Greek name only known from a coin in a private collection. His name is partly reconstructed. The first name Hippokrates is not fully preserved on the coin. Only pokrates is still visible. His known coin is a tetradrachm, showing the head of the king. The portrait resembles that of the Seleucic kings Seleucus VI Epiphanes Nikator (c. 96–94 BC), and in the length of his beard Demetrios II, from the facial feature Antiochos IX. On the reverse of the coin is shown Zeus sitting on the throne, holding a wreath in place of the usual Nike. The coin is clearly dated to the year 81/80 BC, according to the Seleucid era. Hippokrates Autokrator Nikephoros is perhaps also known from a coin of Kamnaskires III and Anzaze, that overstruck a coin of that king. A similar overstrike is known from a coin of Characene king Tiraios II.

The exact position of Hippokrates Autokrator Nikephoros is not known. The style of his coins is different to those of the Elymais making is unlikely that he was a king there. His title 'Basileus Autokrator' was used by Seleucid usurpers such as Tryphon (141-138 BC), also the title 'Strategos Autokrator' has been documented. He might have ruled briefly in Charakene as the overstrike of Tiraios II indicates. One recently proposed hypothesis is that Hippokrates was a Seleucid general (strategos) of the Seleucid king Antiochos XII, after whose death on the battle field 83/82 BC against the Nabateans, Hippokrates would have escaped with the remaining Seleucid troops to the North-East, and tried to establish himself in the area of Elymais. Winning a battle on the way would have brought him the title 'Nikephoros'.
