= Thalassia (queen) =

Thalassia (fl. 2nd century BCE) was the wife of Hyspaosines, king of Characene, a small but powerful kingdom on the Persian Gulf in what is now known as Iraq. Thalassia is a rare Greek name.

Thalassia is known from cuneiform texts found in Babylon, where she appears as Talasi'asu. In these texts it is reported that after the death of her husband in 124 BCE, she tried to install their son on the throne of the kingdom. The son is not named and therefore it remains open whether she was successful, however history shows that the king who eventually succeeded Hyspaosines was Apodakos, who some scholars believe to be this son. Thalassia is also known from a building inscription found in Bahrain, where she is mentioned together with her husband. In this inscription, the Greek version of her name is attested.

== Literature ==
- P.L. Galier, P. Lombard, K.M. al-Sindi: Greek Inscriptions from Bahrain, In: Arabian archaeology and epigraphy, 13 (2002), S. 223-26 the Inscription from Bahrain (pdf)
