= Apodakos =

2nd-century BC king of Characene

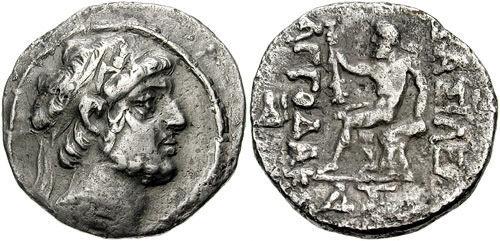
Coin of Apodakos

Apodakos was a king of Characene, a kingdom presumably vassal of the Parthian Empire.

Apodakos is known from his silver and bronze coins, only some of which are dated. The dated coins belong to the years 110/09 to 104/3 BC.

In 124 BC, Hyspaosines, the first king of Characene died. After his death, his widow Thalassia tried to install their son on the throne. However, the events surrounding the succession are known from Babylonian cuneiform texts and the name of the son is not mentioned.

Whether Apodakos was the son of Hyspaosines remains undetermined, however, he has certain historicity from about 14 years later, as king of the small kingdom.

== Literature ==
Preceded by Hyspaosines	King of Characene; 110/09 to 104/3 BC.	Succeeded by Tiraios I
