= Tiraios II =

1st-century BC king of Characene

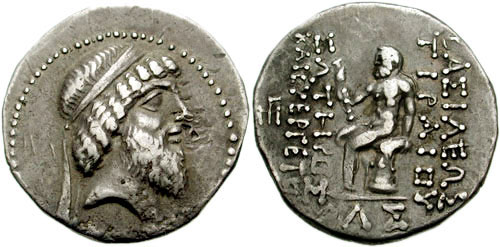
Coin of Tiraios II.

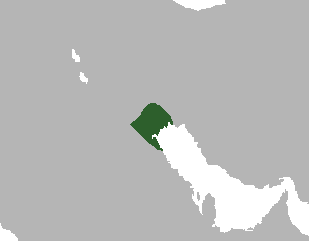
Characene 51BC

Tiraios II was a king who ruled from about 79/78 to 49/48 BC the state of Characene, a vassal state of the Parthians.

Like most kings of Characene he is known only from numismatic sources, in his case his silver and bronze coins.

He was also mentioned by Lucian of Samosata, who says of him that he lived till 92.

His coinage indicates he was hellenised. He was the first king of Charakene to call himself Soter.

One of his coins overstrikes a coin of a king Hippokrates Autokrator Nikephoros. The latter might be an usurpator in the Charakene.

Preceded by Tiraios I	King of Characene; 79/78 to 49/48 BC	Succeeded by Artabazos I
