= Abinergaios II of Characene =

2nd-century king of the Parthian state of Characene

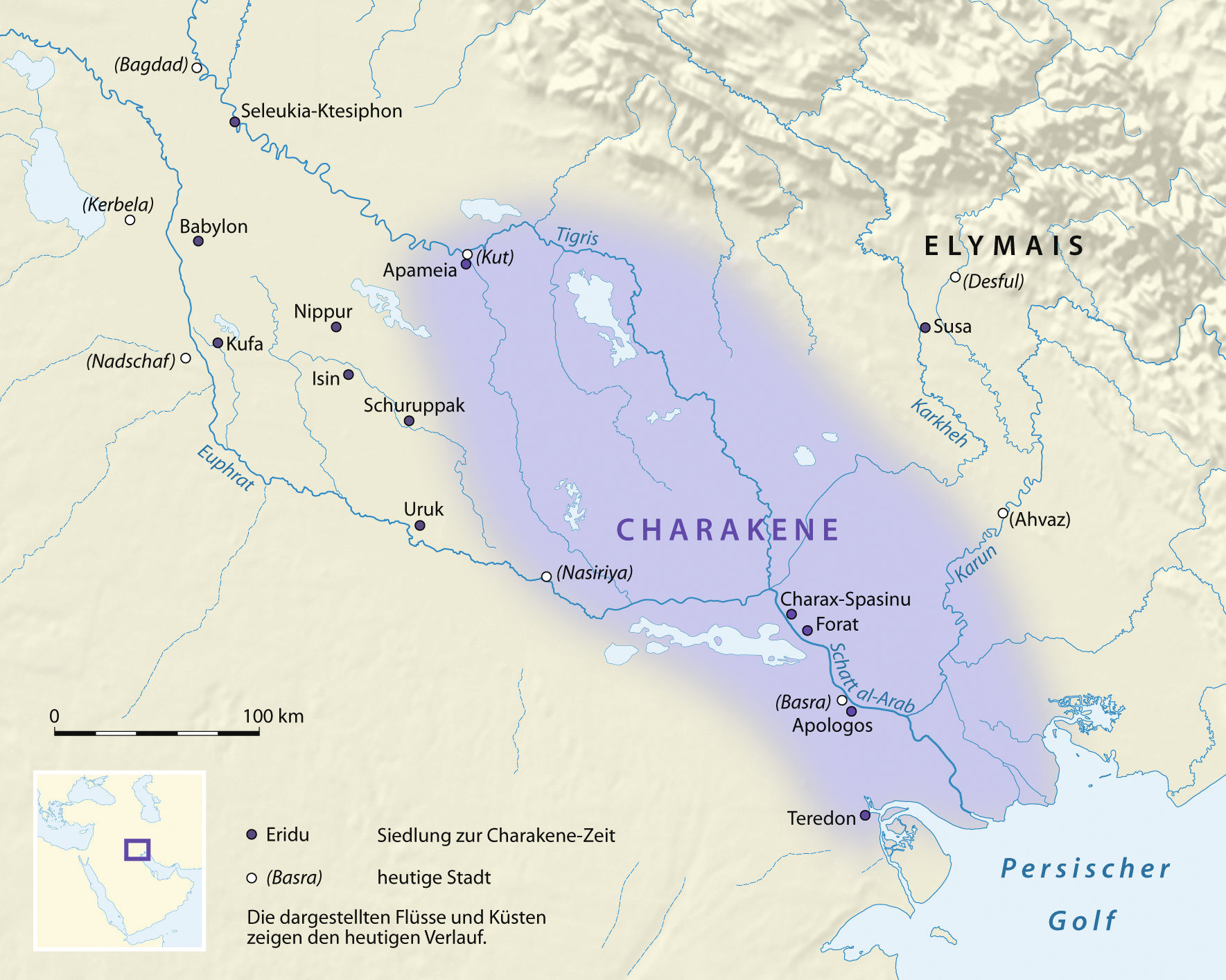
Map of the Characene Kingdom.

Abinergaios II was a ruler of Characene, an ancient kingdom located at the head of the Persian Gulf in modern Iraq. He reigned around 170 AD and like most Characene rulers he is known only from his coins, on which the spelling of his name varies.

He is the first king of Characene to use only Aramaic on his coins instead of Greek. He is also the first ruler of Characene to not date his coins. Both features indicate a significant decrease in Hellenistic traditions under his rule. The actual dates of his reign can only be estimated.

Abinergaios II of Characene
Preceded by Orabazes II	King of Characene c. 165–180 AD	Succeeded by Attambelos VIII
