= Tiraios I =

1st-century BC king of Characene

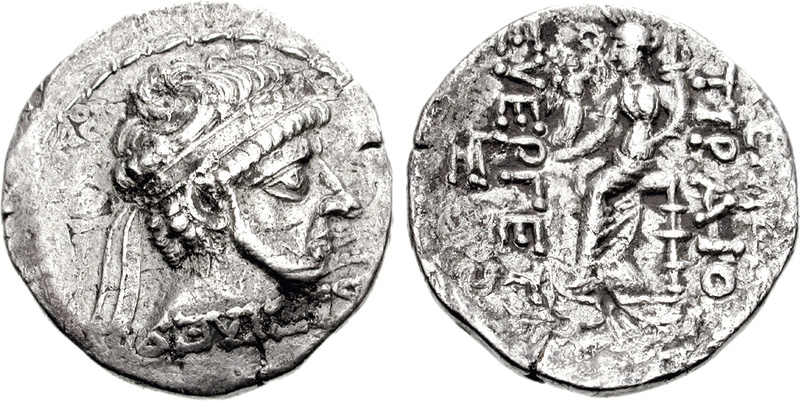
Tiraiosi.

Tiraios I was a king from 95/94 BC to 90/89 BC of Characene, a vassal state of the Parthians .

Like most kings of Characene he is known only from numismatic sources, in his case silver tetradrachms and bronze coins.

He was the first ruler of Characene whose coins described him as "Euergetes" (Benefactor) and he is also unique in that his coins bear on the reverse the goddess Tyche, while the other rulers of Characene depicted Heracles.

The Chinese explorer Gan Ying visited Characene during his reign.

Preceded by Apodakos	King of Characene; 95/94 BC to 90/89 BC	Succeeded by Tiraios II
