= Attambelos V =

1st-century AD ruler of Characene

- Ruler of the state of Characene
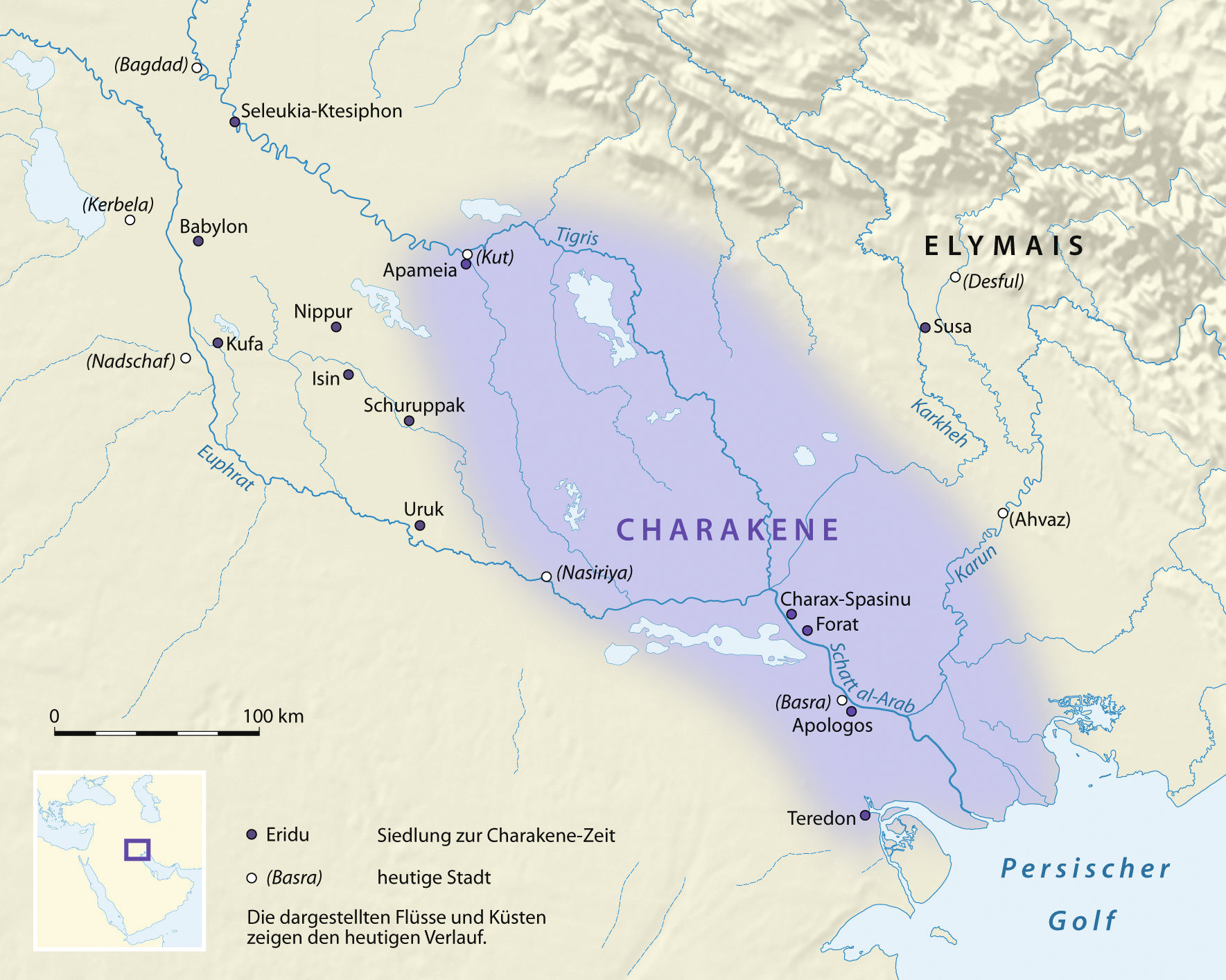
- Characene Kingdom.
- Reign: 64-73

Attambelos V of Characene was a ruler of the state of Characene who ruled from 64/65–73/74 but who is known only from the coins he minted.

Attambelos was a first century ruler if not outright king, of the state of Characene, centered on the northern end of the Persian Gulf. His capital was probably Charax.

He ruled from 64 to 73 and was the successor of Attambelos IV, but his rule is known only from coins he minted. The king list of Characene is a modern construct and given the known scarcity of records could well be inaccurate.
