= Theonesios I of Characene =

1st century BC king of Characene

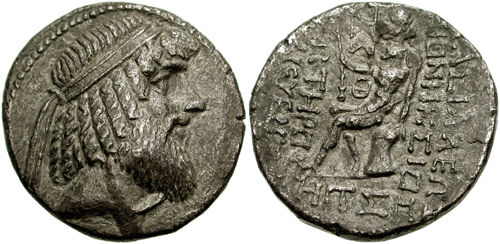
Coin of Thionesios I.

Theonesios I was a King of Characene, a vassal state of the Parthian empire and important trading port on the Persian Gulf. His rule was from 25/24BC to 19/18BC.

He is known only from his silver Tetradrachms, which exhibits various spelling of his name.

Theonesios I of Characene
Preceded by Attambelos I	King of Characene; 19 BC	Succeeded by Attambelos II
