= Artabazos of Characene =

1st century BC king of Characene

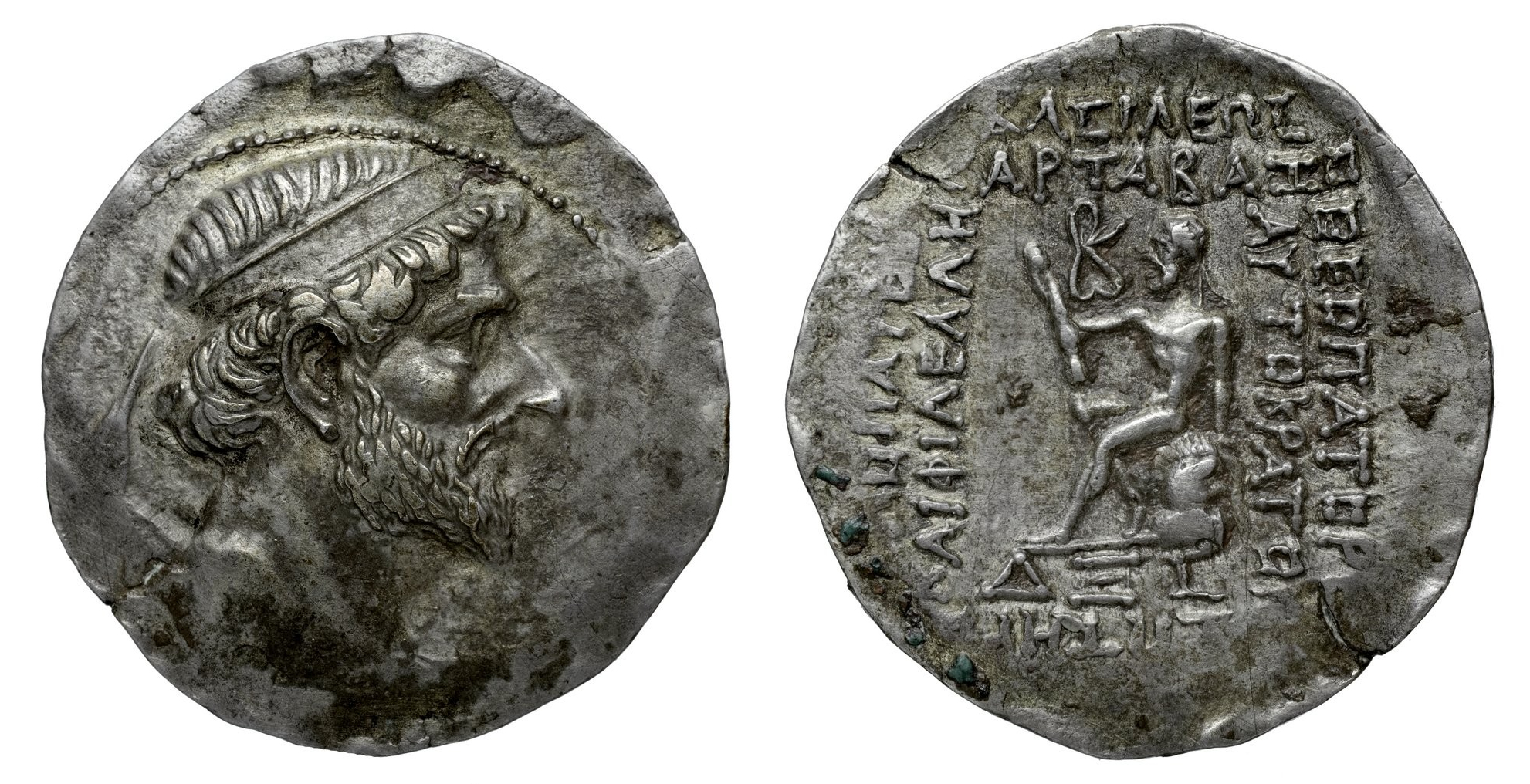
Coinage of Artabazos of Characene

Artabazos I of Characene was a king of Characene, a vassal state of the Parthians. His short reign lasted only from 49/48-48/47 BC.

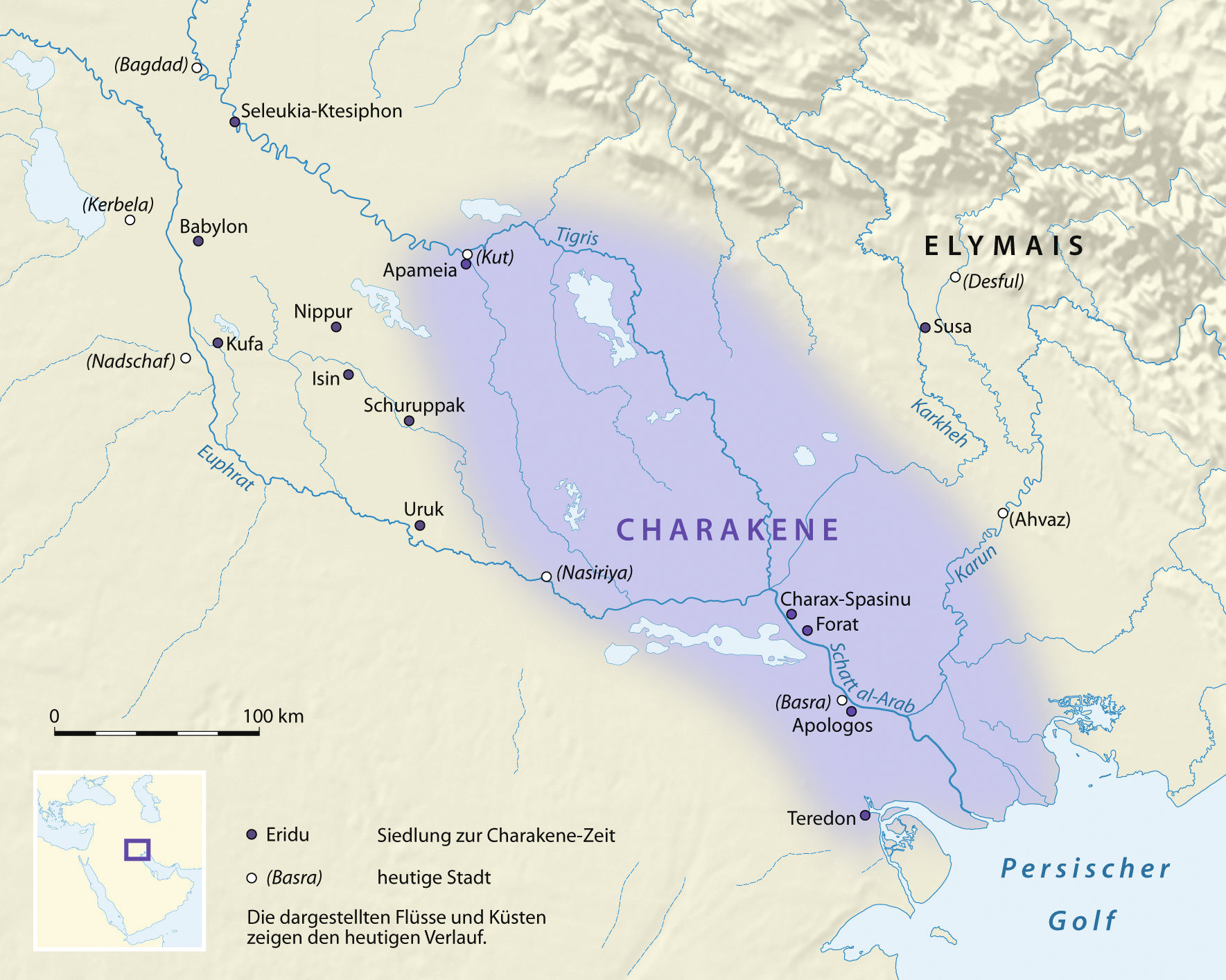
Characene Map.

Like most kings of Characene, he is known only from numismatic sources,

A unique tetradrachm, is dated DXS (48-47 b.c.) and displays on the reverse an extended Greek inscription basileōs artabazo theopatoros autokratoros sōtēros philopatoros kai philellēnos translates “of the king Artabazes, of divine descent, ruler in his own right, the deliverer, who loves his father and the Greeks” The square arrangement of this epithet spaced around a typical Greek Heracles, is copied from the conventional style of contemporary Parthian coinage.

His name was hellenised as, like his predecessor, his coin described him as Soter (savior) .

He is perhaps also mentioned by Lucian (Macrobii, 15). According to him he was 86 years when came to power.

Artabazos of Characene
Preceded by Tiraios II	King of Characene; 49-48 BC	Succeeded by Attambelos I
