= Meredates of Characene =

2nd century Parthian prince who ruled the state of Characene

Meredates 𐭌𐭕𐭓𐭃𐭕
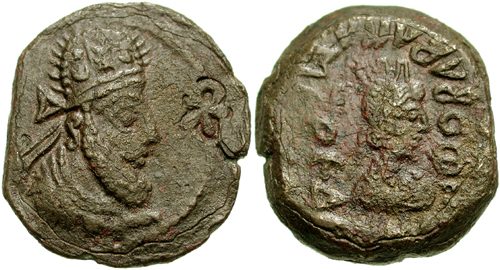
- Coin of Meredates

King of Characene
- Reign: 131–150/1
- Predecessor: Attambelos VII
- Successor: Orabazes II
- Died: 151
- Dynasty: Arsacid dynasty
- Father: Pacorus II
- Religion: Zoroastrianism

Meredates (Parthian: 𐭌𐭕𐭓𐭃𐭕 Mihrdāt) was a Parthian prince who ruled the state of Characene, a vassal of the Parthian Empire and important trading port, which he ruled from c. 131 to 150/151.

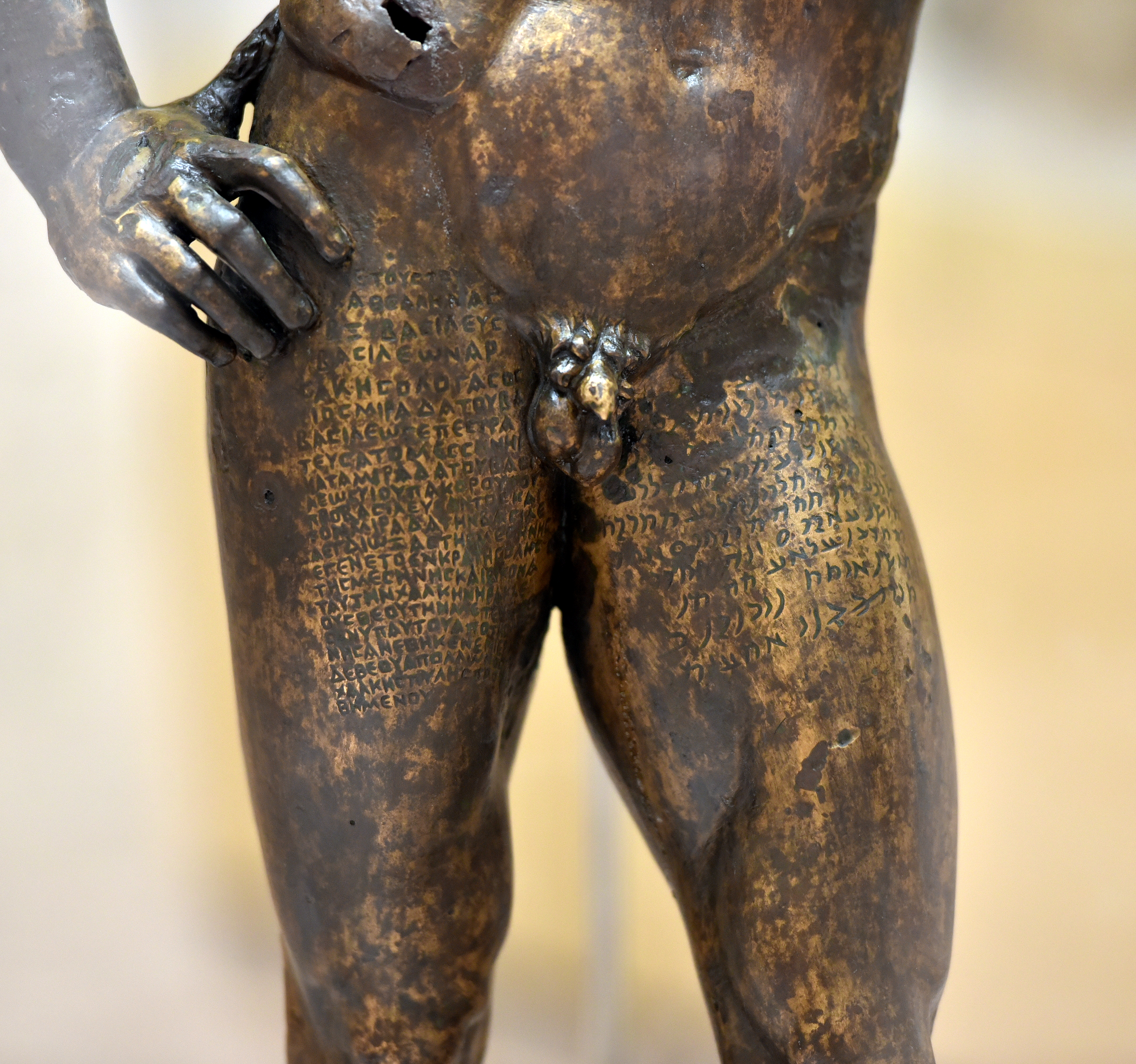
Inscription on the Heracles statue

== Biography ==
Meredates was a son of the Parthian King of Kings Pacorus II (r. 78–110). The Kingdom of Characene had since 141 BC been ruled by Hyspaosines and his descendants as Parthian vassals; the last king of the line, Attambelos VII without much trouble submitted to the Roman emperor Trajan in 116 AD. However, with Trajans failure and death the following year, Attambelos VII political authority collapsed. The Parthians most likely put an end to Hyspaosinid rule in the region and appointed one of their own on the throne. Based on the Characenian coins, Meredates became king of the region in c. 131, during the reign of his brother Vologases III (r. 110–147). During his rule, Meredates became a powerful client-king, due to his commercial leadership and a lucrative alliance with the Palmyrene merchants.

In 147, a Parthian prince named Vologases IV staged a coup d'état and succeeded Vologases III in 147, marking the establishment of a new branch of the Arsacid dynasty on the Parthian throne. Meredates, member of the overthrown Arsacid branch, and in possession of vast amount of resources, posed a great danger to Vologases IV; in 150/51 AD, Vologases IV invaded Characene and defeated Meredates, and appointed Orabazes II, most likely a relative of his, as the new king of the region. Vologases IV's forces seized a statue of Heracles, the patron god of the Characenian royalty. The statue was taken to the temple of Apollo in Seleucia, where it was displayed as a demonstration of Vologases IV's victory. A bilingual inscription (Greek and Parthian) was carved on the statue, which recounts Vologases IV's conquest of Characene:

"In the year of the Greeks 462 (151 AD) the King of Kings Arsaces Vologases, son of Mithridates king, led a military expedition into Mesene against Mithridates king, son of previous ruler Pacorus, and after king Mithridates had been expelled from Mesene, became the ruler of all of Mesene and of this bronze statue of the god Heracles, which he himself transported from Mesene, placed in this Sanctuary of the god Apollo who guards the Bronze Door."

== Sources ==
- Gregoratti, Leonardo (2013). "Epigraphy of Later Parthia". Voprosy Epigrafiki: Sbornik statei. 7: 276–284.
- Gregoratti, Leonardo (2017a). "The Arsacid Empire". In Daryaee, Touraj (ed.). King of the Seven Climes: A History of the Ancient Iranian World (3000 BCE - 651 CE). UCI Jordan Center for Persian Studies. pp. 1–236. ISBN 9780692864401.
- Gregoratti, Leonardo (2017b). Sinews of the other empire: The Parthian Great King'srule over vassal kingdoms. Oxbow Books. pp. 276–284.
- Hansman, John (1991). "Characene and Charax". Encyclopaedia Iranica, Vol. V, Fasc. 4. pp. 363–365.
- Wiesehöfer, Josef (2001). Ancient Persia. Translated by Azodi, Azizeh. I.B. Tauris. ISBN 978-1-86064-675-1.

Meredates of Characene
Preceded by Attambelos VII	King of Characene; 131-150/51	Succeeded by Orabazes II
