= Theonesios II =

1st-century Characene king

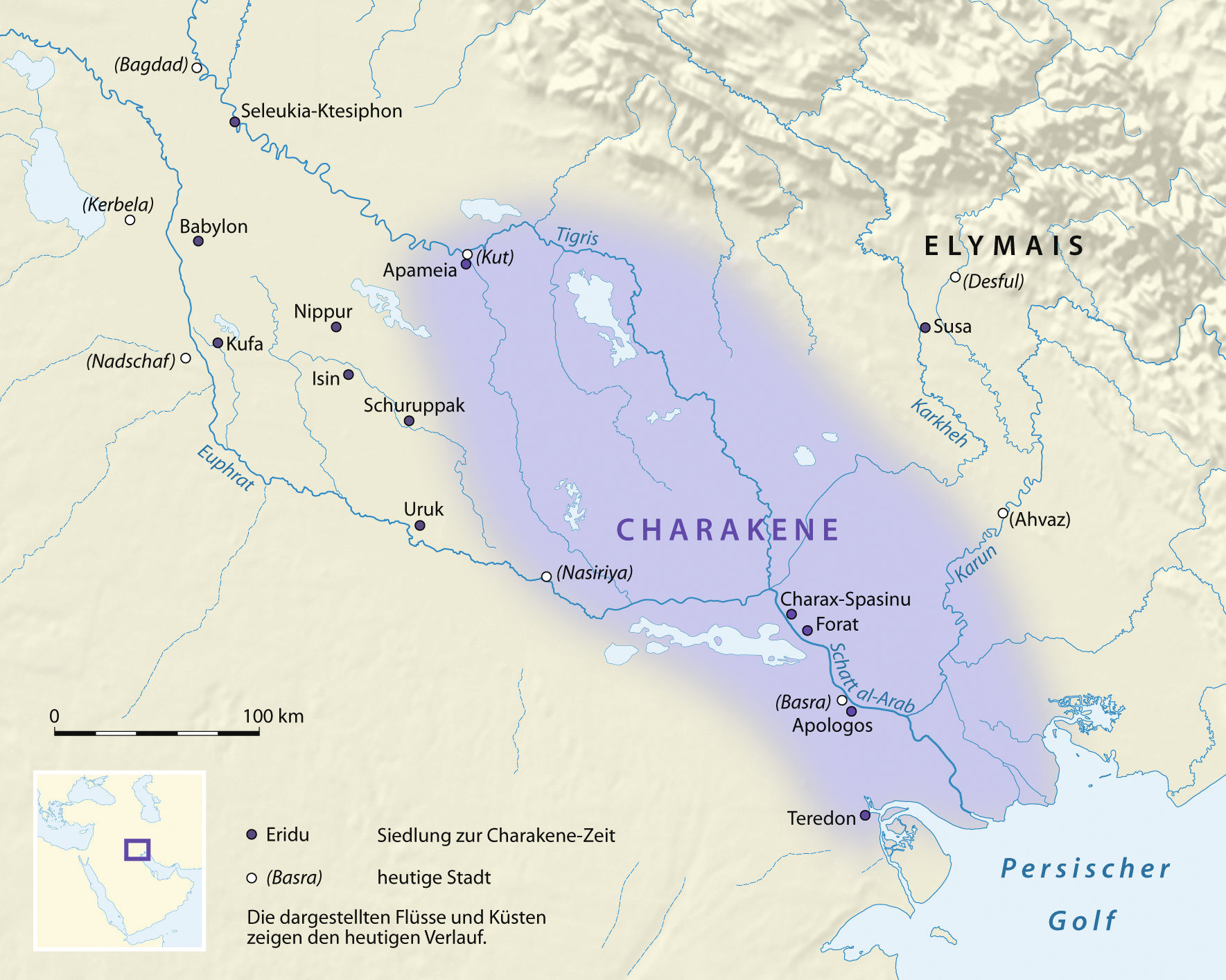
Characene Kingdom.

Theonesios II of Characene was a 1st century king of the kingdom of Characene located at the mouth of the Tigris-Euphrates rivers during antiquity. He ruled for only a few months in 46/47AD. His rule is known only by the coins he minted.

He was succeeded by Theonesios III.

Religious titles
Preceded by Attambelos III	King of Characene; 46-47BC	Succeeded by Theonesios III
