= Attambelos III =

1st-century AD king of Characene

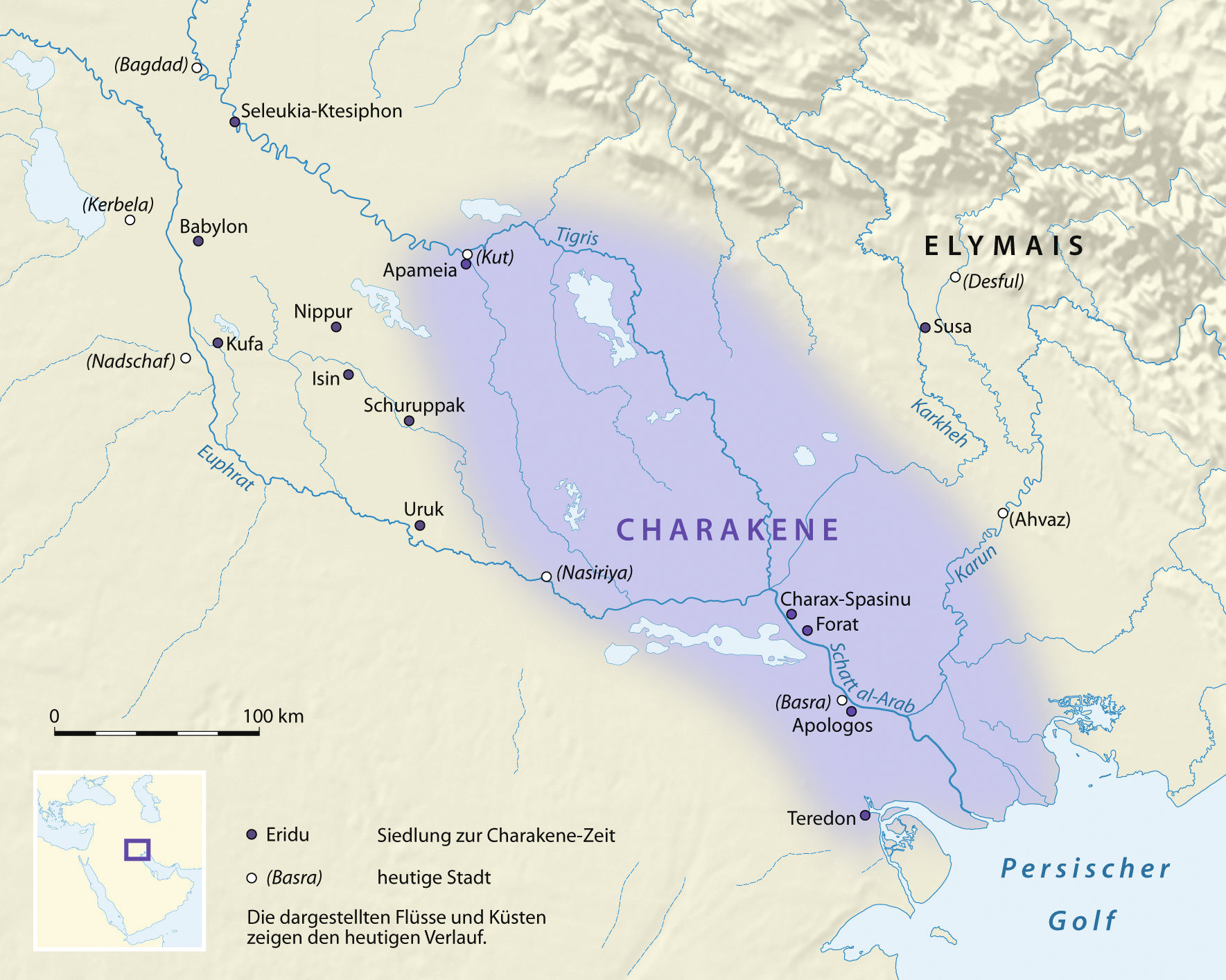
Characene Kingdom.

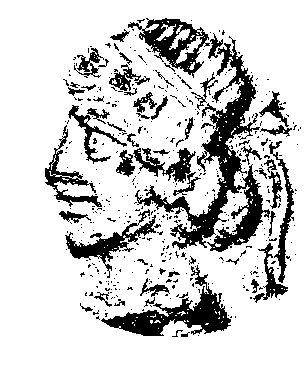
Drawing of Attombelos III from one of his Tetra Drachma.

Attambelos III of Characene was a king of Characene who ruled from approximately 37/38 to 44/45AD. His rule is known only by the coins he minted. The presence of these coins as far afield as Oman and southern Arabia indicates that his rule saw a time of extensive trade.

He was succeeded by Theonesios II.

Religious titles
Preceded by Orabazes I	King of Characene; 37/38–44/45BC	Succeeded by Theonesios II
