= Hyspaosines =

First ruler of Characene (c. 141–124 BC)

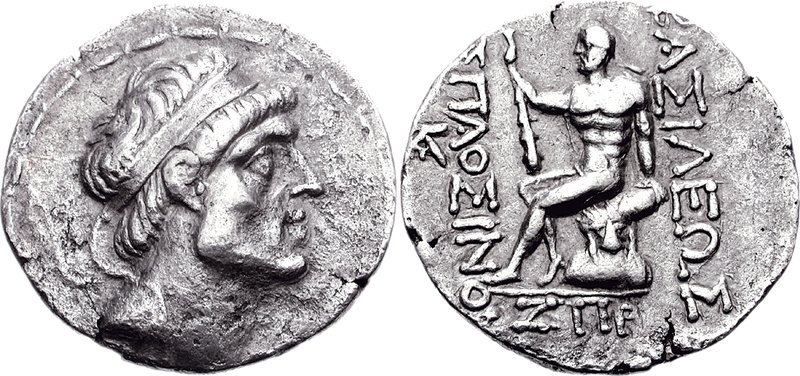
- Coin of Hyspaosines as King, minted at Charax Spasinu in 126/5 BC

King of Characene
- Reign: c. 141–124 BC
- Successor: Apodakos

King of Babylon
- Reign: 127 BC
- Predecessor: Artabanus I
- Successor: Artabanus I
- Born: c. 209 BC
- Died: 11 June 124 BC (aged 85)
- Spouse: Thalassia
- Father: Sagdodonacus

Hyspaosines (also spelled Aspasine) was the founder of Characene, a kingdom situated in southern Mesopotamia. He was originally a Seleucid satrap installed by king Antiochus IV Epiphanes (r. 175 – 164 BC), but declared independence in 141 BC after the collapse and subsequent transfer of Seleucid authority in Iran and Babylonia to the Parthians. Hyspaosines briefly occupied the Parthian city of Babylon in 127 BC, where he is recorded in records as king (šarru). In 124 BC, however, he was forced to acknowledge Parthian suzerainty. He died in the same year, and was succeeded by his juvenile son Apodakos.

== Name and background ==
Of Iranian descent, Hyspaosines' name is a Hellenized name of Persian or Bactrian origin, possibly derived from the Old Iranian vispa-čanah ("who appreciates all [things]"). Hyspaosines' father, Sagdodonacus, seemingly had a Bactrian name and was presumably of Bactrian origin himself. He had served the local dynasts (frataraka) of Persis, who had been able to reign independently for three decades from Greek Seleucid authority, and even briefly seize the region of Characene. The Seleucid ruler Antiochus IV Epiphanes (r. 175 – 164 BC) eventually managed to re-establish Greek authority over Persis and Characene, and appointed his general Noumenios as the governor of Characene.

== Governorship ==
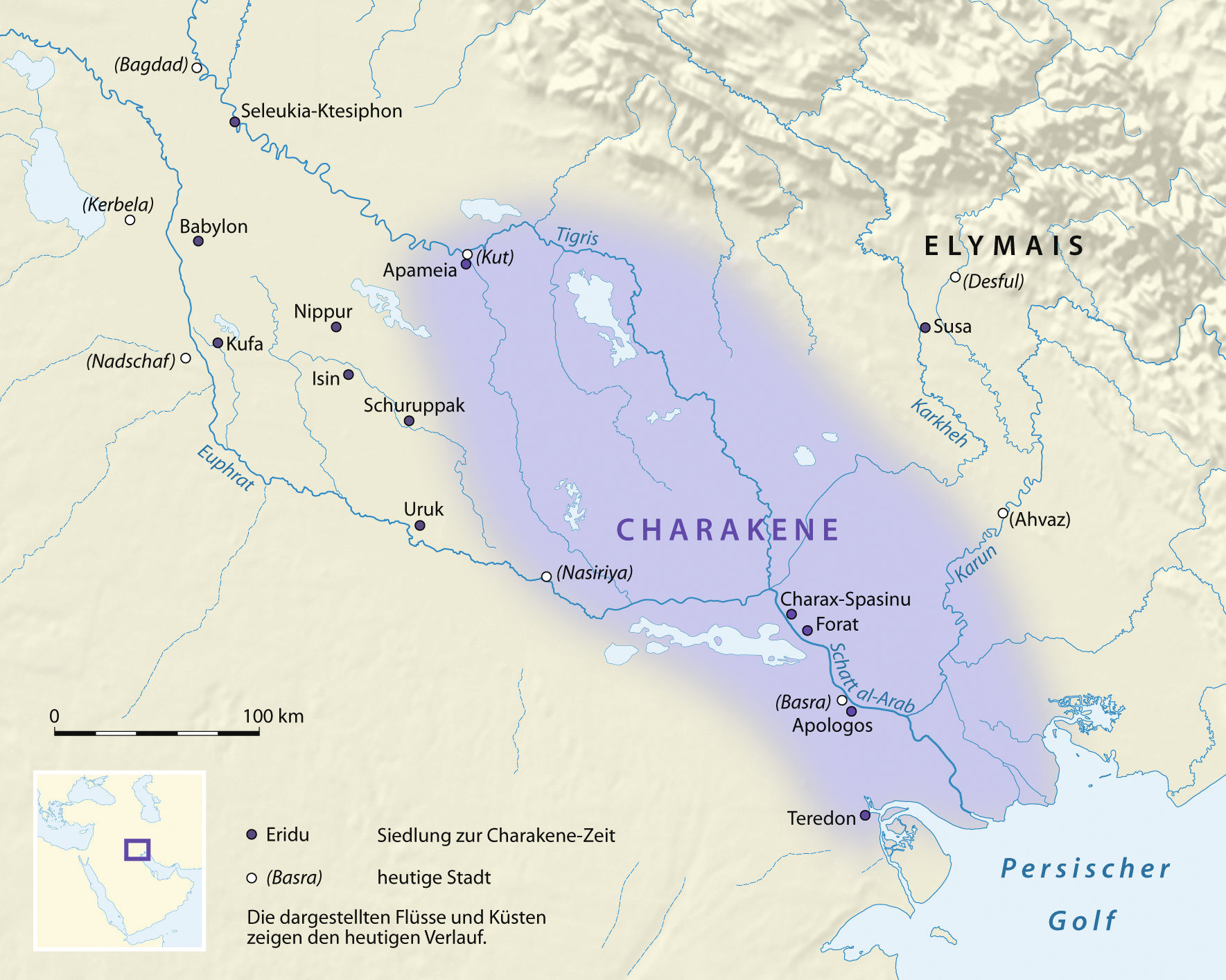
Map of Characene

The capital of Characene, Alexandria, was originally founded by the Macedonian ruler Alexander the Great, with the intention of using the town as a leading commercial port for his eastern capital of Babylon. However, the city never lived up to its expectations, and was destroyed in the mid 3rd-century BC by floods. It was not until the reign of Antiochus IV Epiphanes that the city was rebuilt and renamed Antiochia. After the city was fully restored in 166/5 BC, Antiochus IV appointed Hyspaosines as governor (eparch) of Antiochia and its surroundings.

During this period Antiochia briefly flourished, until Antiochus IV's premature death by disease in 163 BC, which weakened Seleucid authority throughout the empire. With the weakening of the Seleucids, many political entities within the empire declared independence, such as the neighbouring region of Characene, Elymais, which was situated in most of the present-day province of Khuzestan in southern Iran. Hyspaosines, although now a more or less independent ruler, remained a loyal subject of the Seleucids. Hyspaosines' keenness to remain as a Seleucid governor was possibly due to avoid interruption in the profitable trade between Antiochia and Seleucia.

== Reign ==
The Seleucids had suffered heavy defeats by the Iranian Parthian Empire; in 148/7 BC, the Parthian king Mithridates I (r. 171–132 BC) conquered Media and Atropatene, and by 141 BC, was in the possession of Babylonia. The events are recorded in the Babylonian astronomical Diaries. The menace and proximity of the Parthians caused Hyspaosines to declare independence. In 127 BC, Mithridates I's son and successor Phraates II met an abrupt death during his war with the nomads in the east. Hyspaosines took advantage of the situation by seizing Babylon, which is attested in Babylonian records, where he is recorded as king (šarru). His rule over the city lasted briefly; at the start of November 127 BC, the Parthian general Timarchus recaptured it.

Regardless, Hyspaosines' troops continued to plunder the Babylonian region as late as 126 BC. In 124 BC, however, Hyspaosines accepted Parthian suzerainty, and continued to rule Characene as a vassal. He corresponded with the Parthian general of Babylonia, informing him of the defeat of Elymais by the Parthian monarch Mithridates II (r. 124–91 BC). He also returned the wooden throne of Arsaces to the Parthians as a gift to the god Bel. The astronomical diaries report that the king became ill on 3 June 124 BC and died on 11 June 124 BC at the age of 85. His age is reported by 2nd century Roman historian Lucian, who provided a list of rulers who died in a very old age.

He was succeeded by his and queen Thalassia's juvenile son Apodakos. The Parthian commander Sindates was placed as the governor of Characene.

== Bibliography ==
=== Ancient works ===
- Pliny the Elder Natural History, VI 139
- Lucian, Macrobii.
- Astronomical Diaries (now in the British Museum and in a private collection. Following cuneiform texts refer to Hyspaosinesː British Museum nos 33461, 3386, 55070, 45699, 34274, 45708, 45693, 45853, 33024). They are published in Abraham Sachs, Hermann Hunger: Astronomical Diaries and Related Texts from Babylon, III, Diaries from 164 BC. to 61 B.C. Verlag der Österreichischen Akademie der Wissenschaften, Vienna 1996, ISBN 3-7001-2578-X, pp. 216-282. The tablet in the private collection is published by T. G. Pinchesː Babylonian and Oriental Record, Vol. IV, London 1890, 131-141 online.

=== Modern works ===
- Bivar, A.D.H. (1983). "The Political History of Iran Under the Arsacids". In Yarshater, Ehsan (ed.). The Cambridge History of Iran: The Seleucid, Parthian and Sasanian Periods. Vol. 3(1). Cambridge: Cambridge University Press. pp. 21–99. ISBN 0-521-20092-X.
- Brosius, Maria (2006). The Persians: An Introduction. London & New York: Routledge. ISBN 978-0-415-32089-4.
- Curtis, Vesta Sarkhosh (2007). "The Iranian Revival in the Parthian Period". In Curtis, Vesta Sarkhosh and Sarah Stewart (ed.). The Age of the Parthians: The Ideas of Iran. Vol. 2. London & New York: I.B. Tauris & Co Ltd., in association with the London Middle East Institute at SOAS and the British Museum. pp. 7–25. ISBN 978-1-84511-406-0.
- Dąbrowa, Edward [in Polish] (2012). "The Arsacid Empire". In Daryaee, Touraj (ed.). The Oxford Handbook of Iranian History. Oxford University Press. ISBN 978-0-19-987575-7.
- Erskine, Andrew; Llewellyn-Jones, Lloyd; Wallace, Shane (2017). The Hellenistic Court: Monarchic Power and Elite Society from Alexander to Cleopatra. The Classical Press of Wales. ISBN 978-1910589625.
- Eilers, Wilhelm (1983). "Iran and Mesopotamia". In Yarshater, Ehsan (ed.). The Cambridge History of Iran: The Seleucid, Parthian and Sasanian Periods. Vol. 3(1). Cambridge: Cambridge University Press. pp. 481–505. ISBN 0-521-20092-X.
- Garthwaite, Gene Ralph (2005). The Persians. Oxford & Carlton: Blackwell Publishing, Ltd. ISBN 978-1-55786-860-2..
- Galier, P.L.; Lombard, P.; al-Sindi, K.M. (2002). "Greek Inscriptions from Bahrain". Arabian Archaeology and Epigraphy. 13 (2): 223–233. doi:10.1034/j.1600-0471.2002.130204.x.
- Hansman, John (1991). "Characene and Charax". In Yarshater, Ehsan (ed.). Encyclopædia Iranica. Vol. V/4: C̆es̆tīya–Chinese-Iranian relations VIII. London and New York: Routledge & Kegan Paul. pp. 363–365. ISBN 978-0-939214-71-6.
- Schuol, Monika [in German] (2000). Die Charakene: ein mesopotamisches Königreich in hellenistisch-parthischer Zeit [The State of Characene: One Mesopotamian Kingdom in the Hellenic-Parthian Times] (in German). Stuttgart: Steiner. ISBN 3-515-07709-X..
- Shayegan, M. Rahim (2011). Arsacids and Sasanians: Political Ideology in Post-Hellenistic and Late Antique Persia. Cambridge University Press. ISBN 9780521766418.
- Strootman, Rolf (2017). "Imperial Persianism: Seleukids, Arsakids and Fratarakā". In Strootman, Rolf; Versluys, Miguel John (eds.). Persianism in Antiquity. Franz Steiner Verlag. pp. 177–201. ISBN 978-3515113823.
