= Attambelos II =

1st-century BC king of Characene

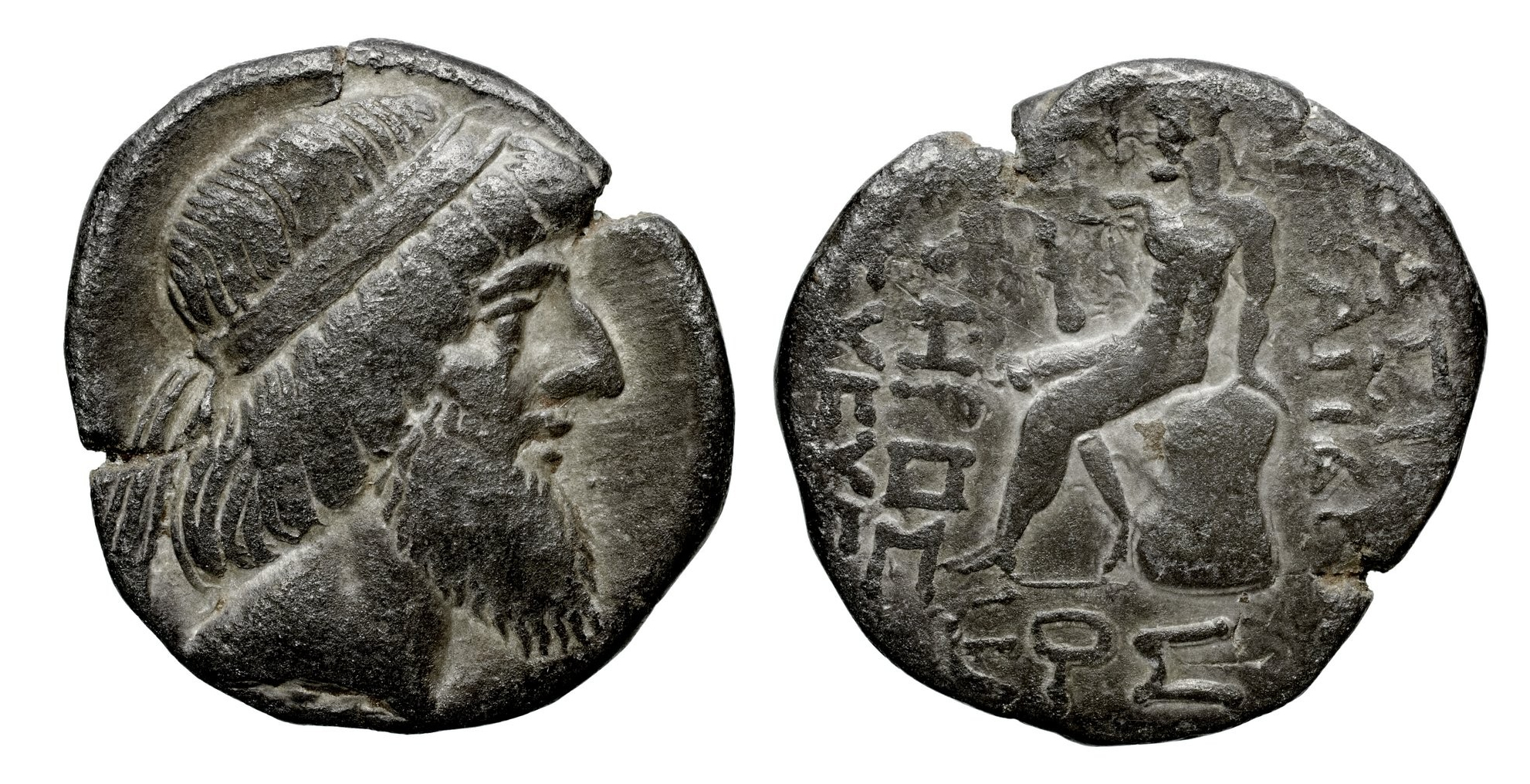
Coin of Attanbelos II King of Characene

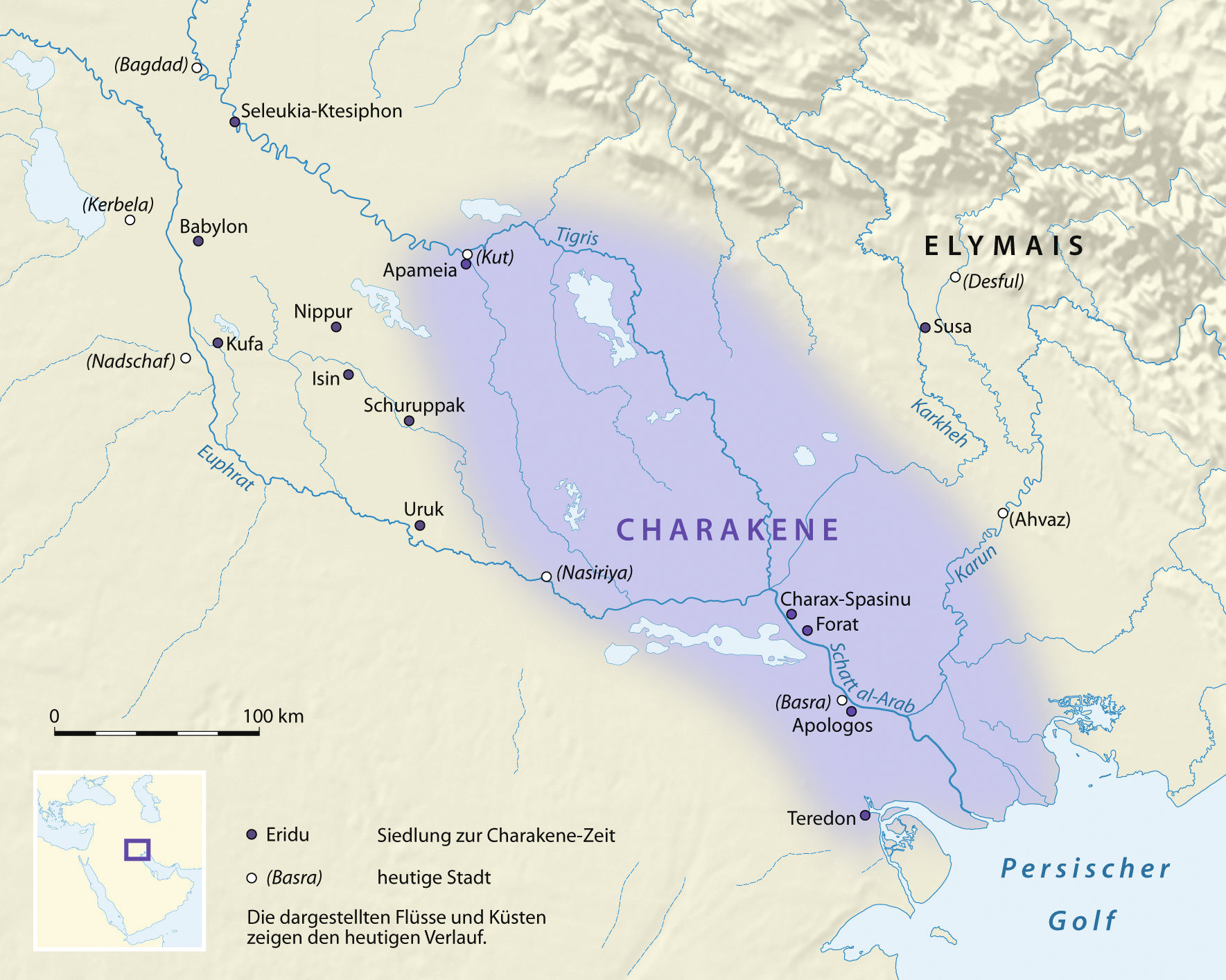
Kingdom of Characene.

Attambelos II was a king of Characene, a Parthian vassal state and important trading port on the Persian Gulf. His rule was from 17/16 to 9/8BC.

He is known only from his coins, which have been found as far away as Susa and on Failaka Island in the Persian Gulf. His Tetradrachms have a low silver content and like almost all Characene coinage show the kings likeness on the front and Heracles on the reverse.

His bronze coins show a Nike on the reverse.

Attambelos II
Preceded by Theonesios I of Characene	King of Characene; 79/78 to 49/48BC	Succeeded by Abinergaos I
