= Orabazes II of Characene =

2nd-century king of the Parthian state of Characene

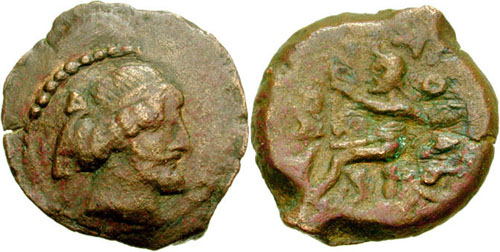
Orabazes coin

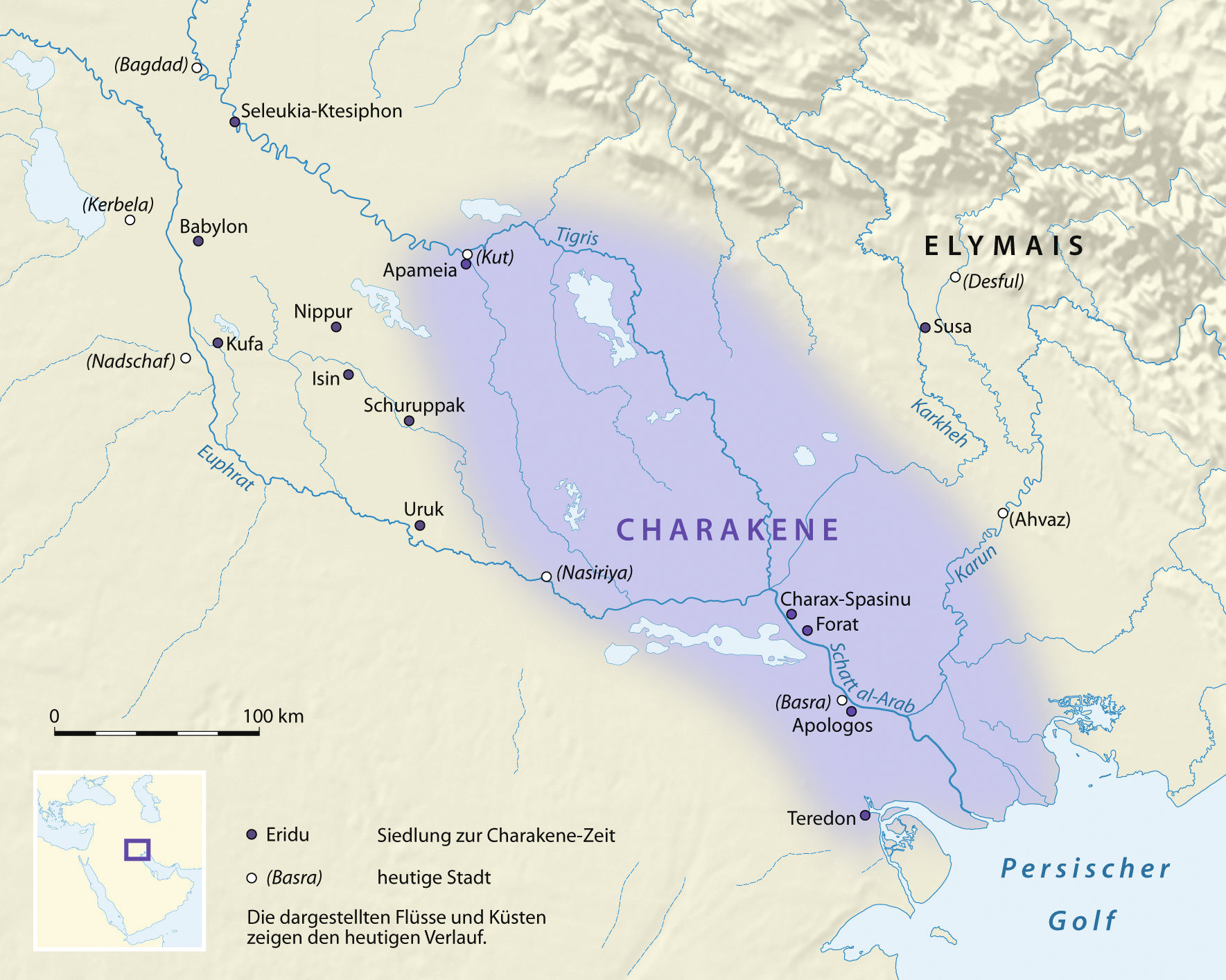
Map of the Characene Kingdom.

Orabazes II was a king of Characene a kingdom located at the head of the Persian Gulf. His reign was from 150/51 to 165. He was most likely a relative of the Parthian king Vologases IV.

Like most Characene rulers he is primarily known from his coins. As his rule was in the latter part of Characene history, at a time when the state was increasingly weak, we find that the spelling of his name varies between coins and that legends on his coins are consistently partially corrupt. Furthermore, so far only two coins are known that carry a readable date (151 and 156/7 AD).

He is also the first Characene ruler to use Aramaic text although the images on the coin are still Hellenistic.

== Sources ==
- Gregoratti, Leonardo (2017). "The Arsacid Empire". In Daryaee, Touraj (ed.). King of the Seven Climes: A History of the Ancient Iranian World (3000 BCE - 651 CE). UCI Jordan Center for Persian Studies. pp. 1–236. ISBN 9780692864401.

Orabazes II of Characene
Preceded by Meredates	King of Characene; 150/51- 165	Succeeded by Abinergaios II
