= Attambelos VII =

Early 2nd century king of Characene

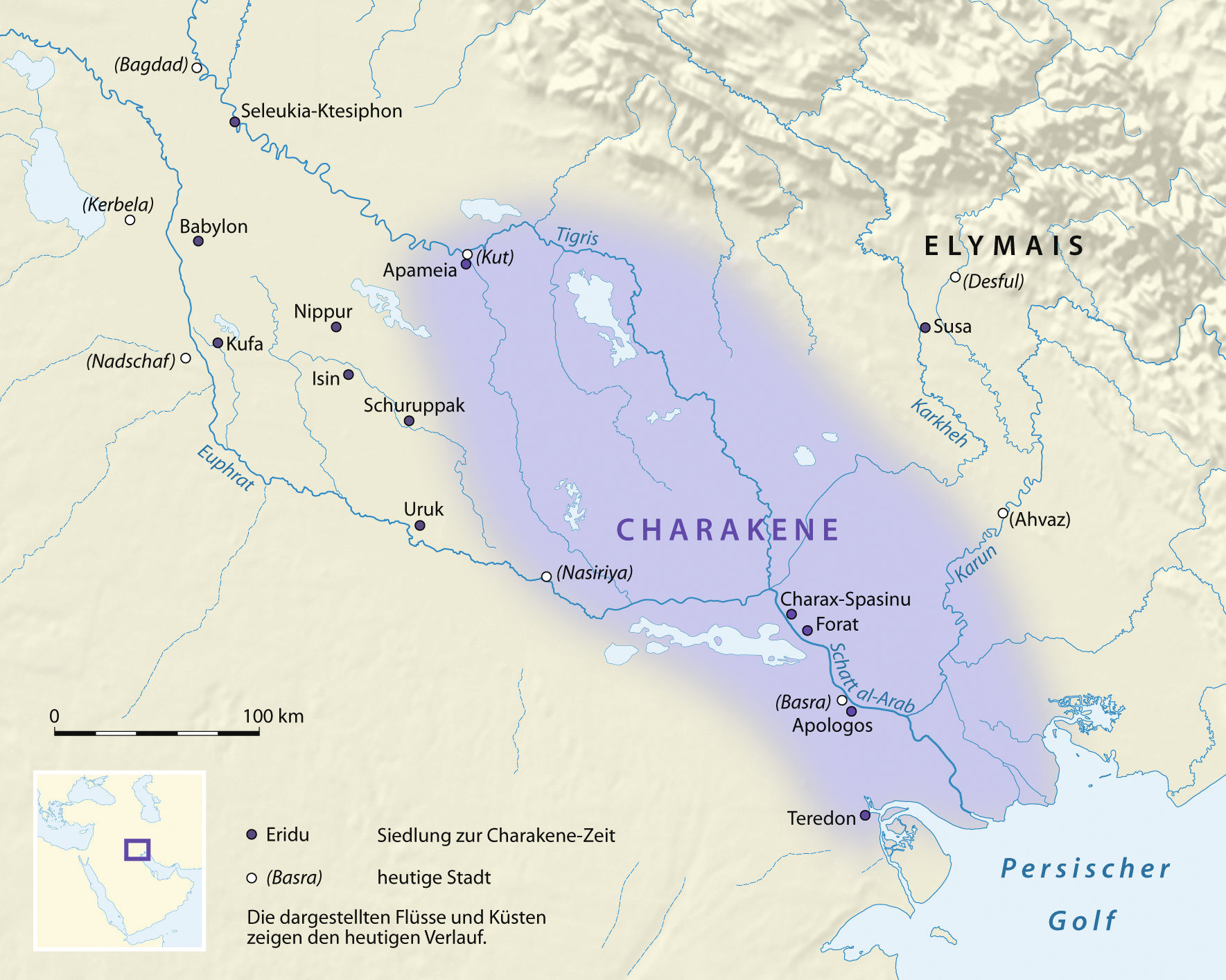
Map of the Characene Kingdom.

Attambelos VII was a king of Characene, a vassal state of the Parthians and important trading port. His short reign lasted from 113/4 to 116/7 AD and was spent mostly contending with the Roman invasion under Trajan.

== Career ==
Like most kings of Characene he is primarily known from numismatic sources, in his case from few a few bronze coins dated 113/114AD.

In 114 or 115 the Emperor Trajan took the Parthian capital city of Ctesiphon and then moved with a fleet of 50 ships to the Characene state on the Persian Gulf. Attambelos VII surrendered to Trajan around 116/17AD who received the temporary submission of Attambelos, as the ruling prince in Characene.

== Legacy ==
Despite the overwhelming victory, the Romans did not hold Mesopotamia for long, with the area being abandoned shortly after the death of Trajan. However, the fate of Attambelos VII during this time is unknown. The next King of Characene is not heard of until 131AD. His successor was Meredates son of Pakoros (II), King of the Parthian Empire who had himself been king of Characene from 80 to 101/02, a generation earlier. Meredates was eventually ousted by his cousin Vologases IV, from a rival branch of the Parthian royal house, indicating a time of weakness within both the Parthian royalty and the local Characene rulers, a weakness made much worse by the opportunistic invasion by Trajan. This weakening in royal power may also be indicated by the quality of Attambelos coinage, which is bronze, unlike the silver Tetradrachm coinage of his predecessors and may account for the lapse in coinage after Attambelos VII time.

Attambelos VII coinage is also significant as his are the last Characene coinage that have a truly Greek style. From the invasion of Trajan the influence of Greek style becomes noticeably less.

== See also ==
- Trajan's Parthian campaign

Attambelos VII
Preceded by Theonesios IV	King of Characene; 113/14-117	Succeeded by Meredates
