= Attambelos VI =

2nd-century AD ruler of Characene

- Ruler of the state of Characene
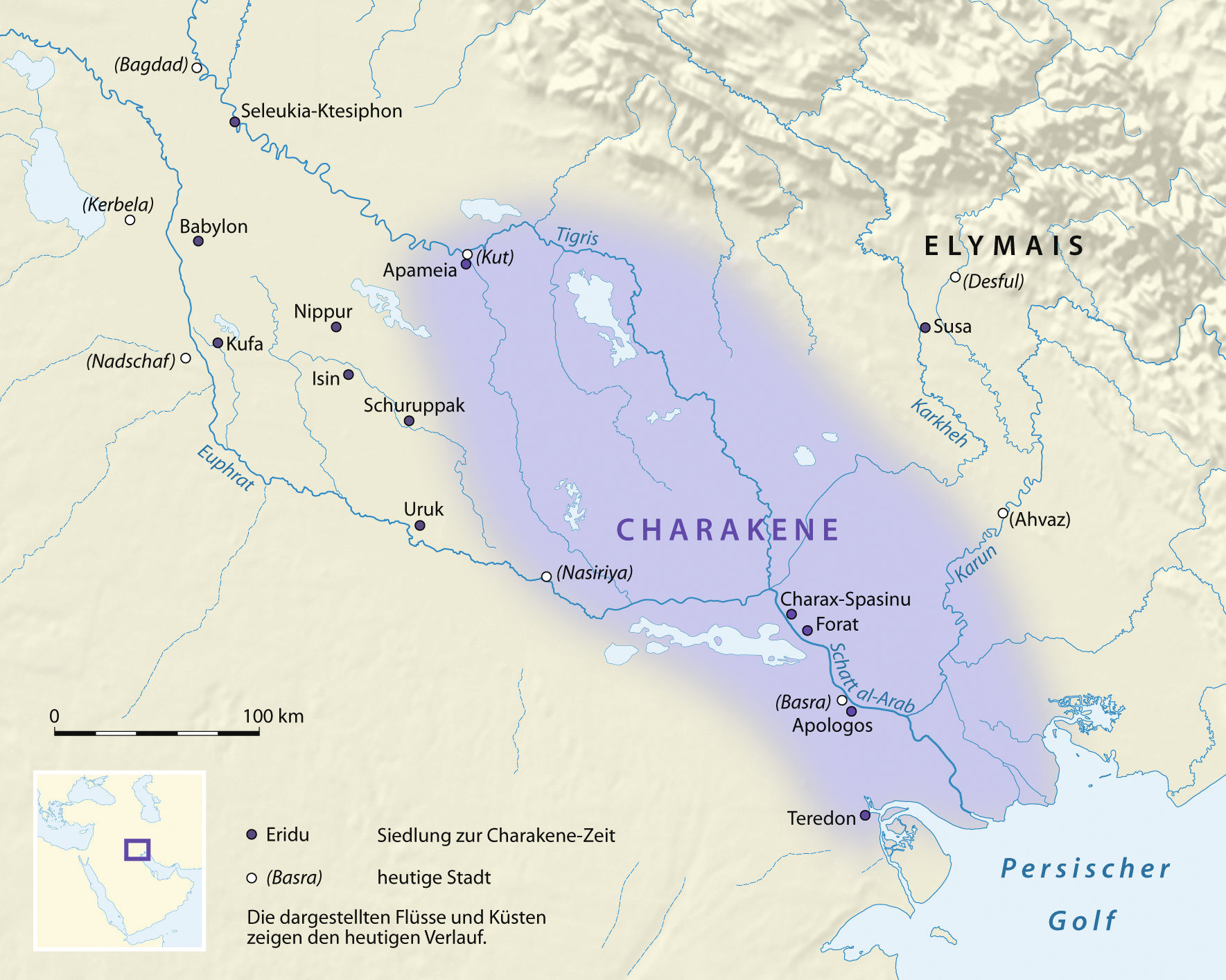
- Map of the Characene Kingdom.
- Reign: 101-105

Attambelos VI of Characene was a ruler of the state of Characene, who ruled from approximately 101/02-105/06 and is known only from the coins he minted.
