= Attambelos I =

1st-century BC king of Characene

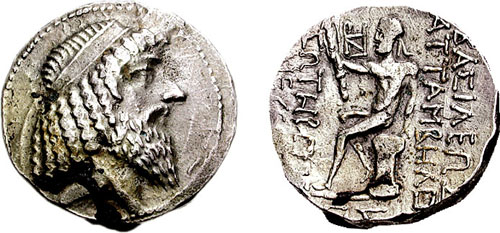
Coin of Attambelos I

Attambelos I was a king of Characene, a Parthian vassal state and important trading port and emporium on the Persian Gulf. His rule was from 47/46 to 25/24BC.

He is recorded by only four coins dated in the years 10/11, 11/12, 13/14 and 22/23BC. Like most Characene Coinage, he is depicted himself on the front and Heracles (or Nike) on the reverse.

This ruler is also mentioned by Josephus and there is evidence that his rule was interrupted by a foreign king in the year 18/19.

Attambelos I
Preceded by Artabazos I	King of Characene; 47/46-25/24 BC	Succeeded by Theonesios I
