= Maga of Characene =

King of Characene from c. 195 to c. 210

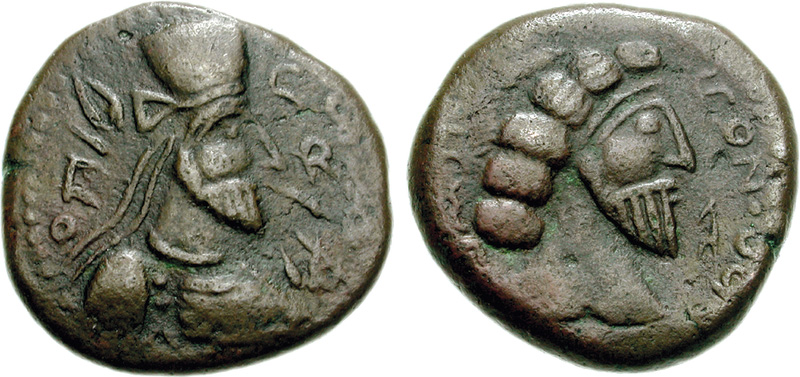
Maga

Maga was a King of Characene a vassal state of the Parthian Empire and important trading city in the Persian Gulf.

He probably ruled at the end of the second century (195 - 210 AD) and is known only from the numerous coins that he minted. His coins are in a Parthian style, and the name on his coins is written in Aramaic as mʼg – which is interpreted as Maga. On these coins, he describes himself as the son of a King Attambelos who is otherwise unrecorded in history. Maga was the last ruler of Characene for which there is contemporary records.

== Predecessor ==
Attambelos VIII was a King of Characene, who ruled around 190 AD. He is known only by the coins of his son of Maga, who calls himself son of King Attambelos. The reading of the name is, however, uncertain and reflects the poor quality of the coins of this time.

== Successor ==
Maga may have had possibly one successor, the twenty-third and last ruler Characene, Abinergaios III, who was defeated in 222 by a Persian named Ardašir. Ardašir had just revolted against his Parthian overlord and was in the process of establishing the Sasanian Empire.

However, the historicity of Abinergaios III is open to question, as he is known only from later Arabic sources while Maga is the last ruler of Characene who is documented by contemporary sources. It should also be noted that the king list of Characene is a modern construct and given the sparsity of records could well be inaccurate.

== Significance ==
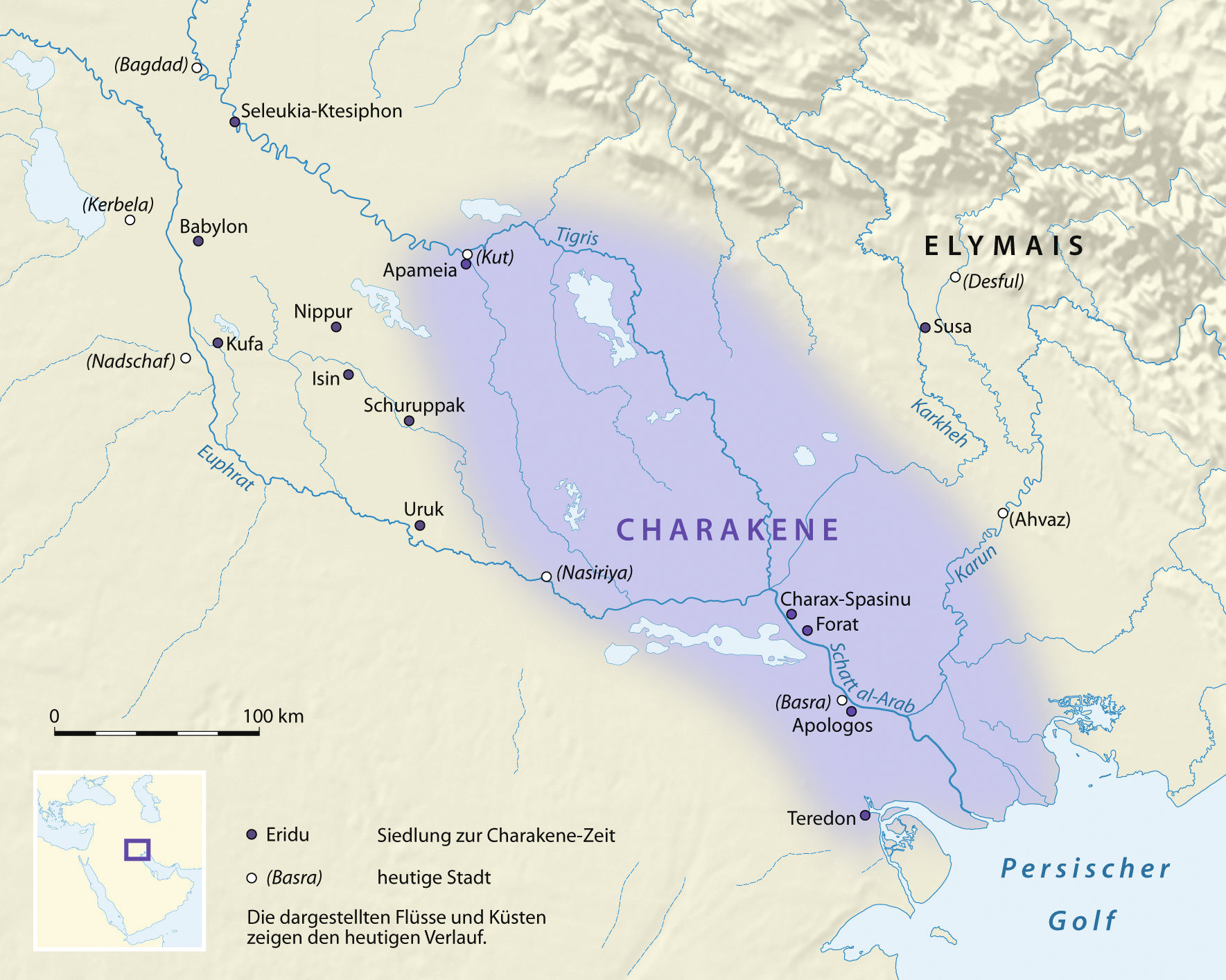
Map of the Characene Kingdom.

Although a minor and poorly recorded vassal king on the edge of the ancient civilisations, Maga’s rule is of some interest as Characene was the last rump state remaining from the Seleucid Empire. Maga, therefore, can be considered to be the last recorded successor of Alexander the Great and the end of his rule also marks the end of the Hellenistic Age.

Maga of Characene
Preceded by Attambelos VIII	King of Characene early 3rd century	Succeeded by Abinergaios III
