= Characene =

State within the Parthian Empire (141 BC-222 AD)

- 141 BC–222 AD
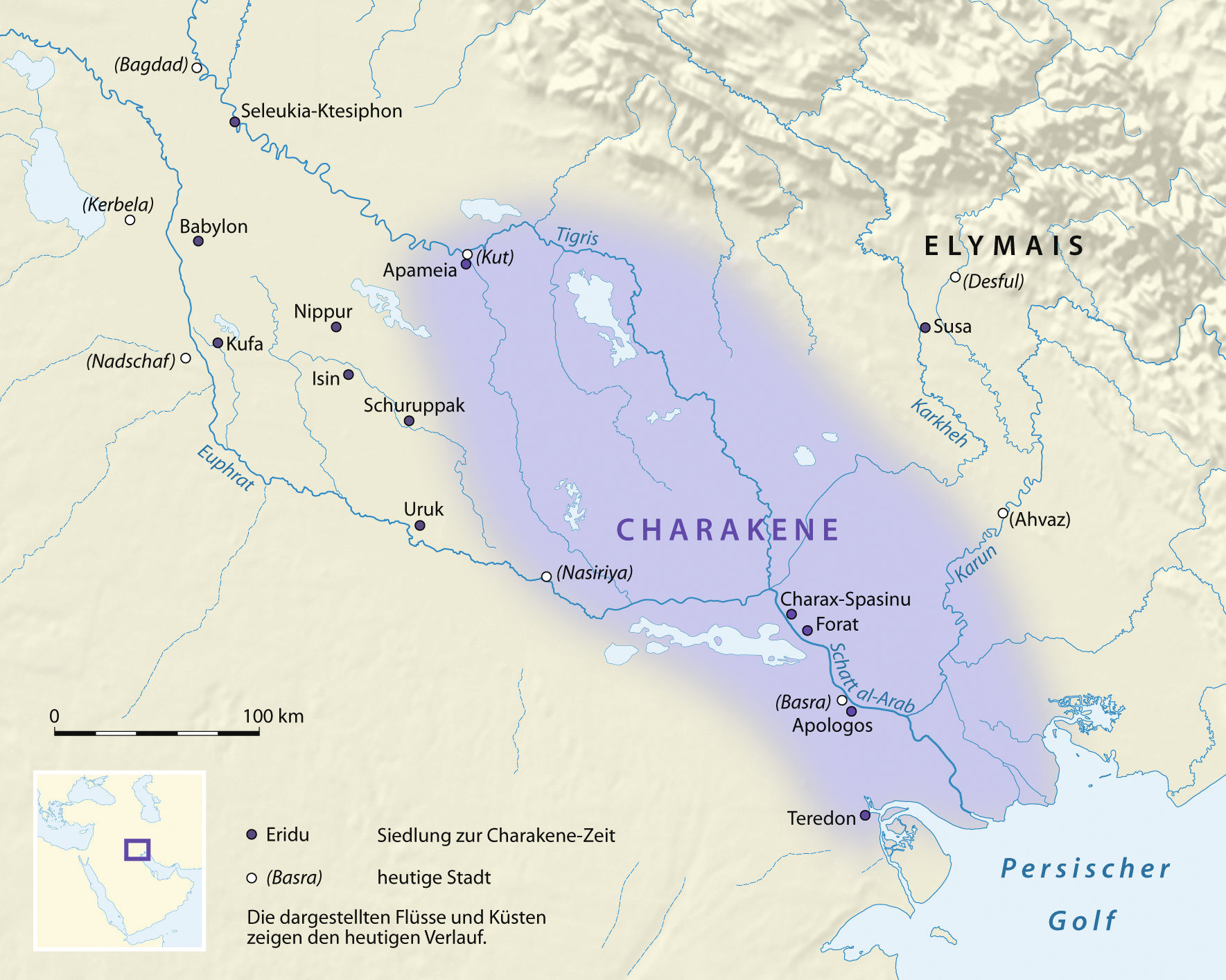
- A map of Characene.
- Status: Autonomous state, frequently a vassal of the Parthian Empire
- Capital: Charax Spasinu
- Common languages: Aramaic (cultural language)
- Government: Monarchy
  - 141–124 BC: Hyspaosines (first)
  - 210–222 AD: Abinergaios III (last)
- Historical era: Classical antiquity
  - Established: 141 BC
  - Sasanian conquest: 222 AD
| Preceded by | Succeeded by |
| Seleucid Empire | Sasanian Empire |

Characene (Ancient Greek: Χαρακηνή), also known as Mesene (Μεσσήνη) or Meshan, was a kingdom founded by the Iranian Hyspaosines located at the head of the Persian Gulf mostly within modern day Iraq. Its capital, Charax Spasinou (Χάραξ Σπασινού), was an important port for trade between Mesopotamia and India, and also provided port facilities for the city of Susa further up the Karun River. The kingdom was frequently a vassal of the Parthian Empire. Characene was mainly populated by Arabs, who spoke Aramaic as their cultural language. All rulers of the principality had Iranian names. Members of the Arsacid dynasty also ruled the state.

== Name ==
The name "Characene" originated from the name of the capital of the kingdom, Charax Spasinu. The kingdom was also known by the older name of the region, "Mesene", which is seemingly of Persian origin, meaning "land of buffalos" or the "land of sheep."

== History ==
The capital of Characene, Alexandria, was originally founded by the Macedonian ruler Alexander the Great, with the intention of using the town as a leading commercial port for his eastern capital of Babylon. The region itself became the Satrapy of the Erythraean Sea. However, the city never lived up to its expectations, and was destroyed in the mid 3rd-century BC by floods. It was not until the reign of the Seleucid king Antiochus IV Epiphanes (r. 175 – 164 BC) that the city was rebuilt and renamed Antiochia. After the city was fully restored in 166/5 BC, Antiochus IV appointed Hyspaosines as governor (eparch) of Antiochia and the Satrapy of the Erythraean Sea.

During this period Antiochia briefly flourished, until Antiochus IV's abrupt death in 163 BC, which weakened Seleucid authority throughout the empire. With the weakening of the Seleucids, many political entities within the empire declared independence, such as the neighbouring region of Characene, Elymais, which was situated in most of the present-day province of Khuzestan in southern Iran. Hyspaosines, although now a more or less independent ruler, remained a loyal subject of the Seleucids. Hyspaosines' keenness to remain as a Seleucid governor was possibly due to avoid interruption in the profitable trade between Antiochia and Seleucia.

The Seleucids had suffered heavy defeats by the Iranian Parthian Empire; in 148/7 BC, the Parthian king Mithridates I (r. 171–132 BC) conquered Media and Atropatene, and by 141 BC, was in the possession of Babylonia. The menace and proximity of the Parthians caused Hyspaosines to declare independence. In 124 BC, however, Hyspaosines accepted Parthian suzerainty, and continued to rule Characene as a vassal. Characene would generally remain a semi-autonomous kingdom under Parthian suzerainty till its fall. The realm of the kingdom included the islands Failaka and Bahrain.

The kings of Characene are known mainly by their coins, consisting mainly of silver tetradrachms with Greek and later Aramaic inscriptions. These coins are dated after the Seleucid era, providing a secure framework for chronological succession.

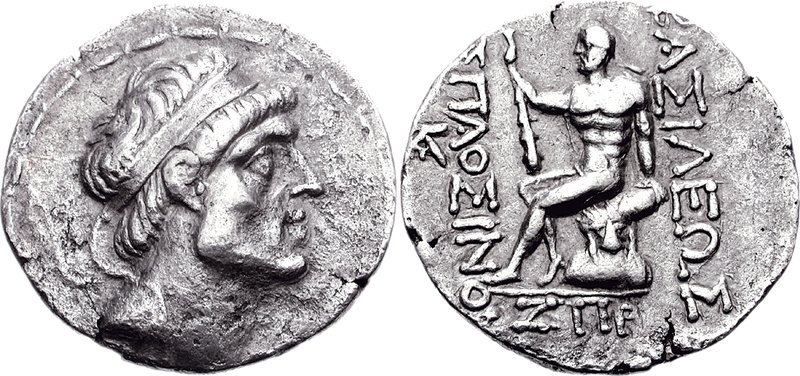
Coin of Hyspaosines as King, minted at Charax Spasinu in 126/5 BC

In his Natural History, Pliny the Elder praises the port of Charax:

The embankments extend in length a distance of nearly 4½ kilometers, in breadth a little less. It stood at first at a distance of 1¾ km from the shore, and even had a harbor of its own. But according to Juba, it is 75 kilometer from the sea; and at the present day, the ambassadors from Arabia, and our own merchants who have visited the place, say that it stands at a distance of one 180 kilometers from the sea-shore. Indeed, in no part of the world have alluvial deposits been formed more rapidly by the rivers, and to a greater extent than here; and it is only a matter of surprise that the tides, which run to a considerable distance beyond this city, do not carry them back again.

Trade continued to be important. A famous Characenian, a man named Isidore, was the author of a treatise on Parthian trade routes, the Mansiones Parthicae. The inhabitants of Palmyra had a permanent trading station in Characene. Many inscriptions mention caravan trade.

Next to Charax, other important cities were Forat (at the Tigris), Apologos and Teredon. On his coins Meredates (ruled 131 to 150/151) calls himself king of the Omani. The latter are mentioned sporadically by ancient writers. According to Pliny (VI.145) they lived between Petra and Charax. They were according to some scholars for a certain period part of the Charakene. So it seems that the kingdom extended to the South of the Persian Gulf. However, the reading and interpretation of the legends on the king's coins is problematic.

In AD 115 the Roman emperor Trajan conquered Mesopotamia as main part of his Parthian campaign. He also reached Characene, where he saw ships bound for India. According to Cassius Dio, Attambelos ruled there and was friendly to the emperor. Also the people of Charax Spasinu are described as friendly towards the emperor. The following two years, the Charakene remained most likely Roman, but emperor Hadrian decided to withdraw from Trajan's territorial gains. It remains uncertain whether the Charakene remained independent or whether it was placed under direct Parthian rule. The next Parthian king attested in ancient sources is Meredates, mentioned in an inscription at Palmyra datable to 131.

In 221–222 AD, an ethnic Persian, Ardashir V, who was King of Persis, led a revolt against the Parthians, establishing the Sasanian Empire. According to later Arab histories, he defeated Characene forces, killed its last ruler, rebuilt the town, and renamed it Astarābād-Ardašīr. The area around Charax that had been the Characene state was thereon known by the Aramaic name myšn, myšwn in the Babylonian Talmud (Baba Kamma 97b; Baba Bathra 73a; Shabbat 101a), or myšyn as attested in an Aramaic incantation bowl from Nippur, which was later adapted by the Arab conquerors as Maysān.

Charax continued, under the name Maysān, with Persian texts making various mention of governors throughout the fifth century. A Nestorian Church was mentioned there in the sixth century. The Charax mint appears to have continued throughout the Sassanid empire and into the Umayyad empire, minting coins as late as AD 715.

The earliest references from the first century A.D. indicates that the people of Characene were referred to as Μεσηνός and lived along the Arabian side of the coast at the head of the Persian Gulf.

== Kings ==
- Hyspaosines c. 127–124 BC
- Apodakos c. 110/09–104/03 BC
- Tiraios I 95/94–90/89 BC
- Bellaios c.85/4 BC
  - possible usurper: Hippokrates Autokrator Nikephoros 81/80 BC
- Tiraios II 79/78–49/48 BC
- Artabazos I 49/48–48/47 BC
- Attambelos I 47/46–25/24 BC
- Theonesios I c. 19/18
- Attambelos II c. 17/16 BC – AD 8/9
- Abinergaos I 10/11; 22/23
- Orabazes I c. 19
- Attambelos III c. 37/38–44/45
- Theonesios II c. 46/47
- Theonesios III c. 52/53
- Attambelos IV 54/55–64/65
- Attambelos V 64/65–73/74
- Orabazes II c. 73–80
- Pakoros 80–101/02
- Attambelos VI c. 101/02–105/06
- Theonesios IV c. 110/11–112/113
- Attambelos VII 113/14–117
- Meredates c. 131–150/51
- Orabazes II c. 150/51–165
- Abinergaios II (?) c. 165–180
- Attambelos VIII c. 180–195
- Maga (?) c. 195–210
- Abinergaos III c. 210–222

== Sources ==
- Bivar, A.D.H. (1983). "The Political History of Iran Under the Arsacids". In Yarshater, Ehsan (ed.). The Cambridge History of Iran: The Seleucid, Parthian and Sasanian Periods. Vol. 3(1). Cambridge: Cambridge University Press. pp. 21–99. ISBN 0-521-20092-X..
- Bosworth, C. E. (1986). "ʿArab i. Arabs and Iran in the pre-Islamic period". Encyclopaedia Iranica, Vol. II, Fasc. 2. pp. 201–203.
- Brosius, Maria (2006). The Persians: An Introduction. London & New York: Routledge. ISBN 978-0-415-32089-4.
- Curtis, Vesta Sarkhosh (2007), "The Iranian Revival in the Parthian Period", in Curtis, Vesta Sarkhosh and Sarah Stewart (ed.), The Age of the Parthians: The Ideas of Iran, vol. 2, London & New York: I.B. Tauris & Co Ltd., in association with the London Middle East Institute at SOAS and the British Museum, pp. 7–25, ISBN 978-1-84511-406-0.
- Eilers, Wilhelm (1983), "Iran and Mesopotamia", in Yarshater, Ehsan (ed.), Cambridge History of Iran, vol. 3, London: Cambridge UP, pp. 481–505
- Erskine, Andrew; Llewellyn-Jones, Lloyd; Wallace, Shane (2017). The Hellenistic Court: Monarchic Power and Elite Society from Alexander to Cleopatra. The Classical Press of Wales. ISBN 978-1910589625.
- Garthwaite, Gene Ralph (2005). The Persians. Oxford & Carlton: Blackwell Publishing, Ltd. ISBN 978-1-55786-860-2.
- Gnoli, Tommaso (2022). "The Parthian and Sasanian Near East (including Hatra, Edessa, and the Characene)". In Kaizer, Ted (ed.). A Companion to the Hellenistic and Roman Near East. John Wiley & Sons. pp. 316–327. ISBN 978-1444339826.
- Gregoratti, Leonardo (2017). "The Arsacid Empire". In Daryaee, Touraj (ed.). King of the Seven Climes: A History of the Ancient Iranian World (3000 BCE - 651 CE). UCI Jordan Center for Persian Studies. pp. 1–236. ISBN 9780692864401.
- Hansman, John F. (1998). "Elymais". Encyclopaedia Iranica, Vol. VIII, Fasc. 4. pp. 373–376.
- Hansman, John (1991). "Characene and Charax". Encyclopaedia Iranica, Vol. V, Fasc. 4. pp. 363–365.
- Potts, Daniel T. (1988). Araby the blest : studies in Arabian archaeology. Copenhagen: Carsten Niebuhr Institute of Ancient Near Eastern Studies. ISBN 8772890517.
- Schippmann, K. (1986). "Arsacids ii. The Arsacid dynasty". Encyclopaedia Iranica, Vol. II, Fasc. 5. pp. 525–536.
- Schuol, Monika (2000), Die Charakene: ein mesopotamisches Königreich in hellenistisch-parthischer Zeit, Stuttgart: . Steiner, ISBN 3-515-07709-X.
- Shayegan, M. Rahim (2011). Arsacids and Sasanians: Political Ideology in Post-Hellenistic and Late Antique Persia. Cambridge University Press. pp. 1–539. ISBN 9780521766418.
- Strootman, Rolf (2017). "Imperial Persianism: Seleukids, Arsakids and Fratarakā". In Strootman, Rolf; Versluys, Miguel John (eds.). Persianism in Antiquity. Franz Steiner Verlag. pp. 177–201. ISBN 978-3515113823.
