= Attambelos IV =

1st-century AD king of Characene

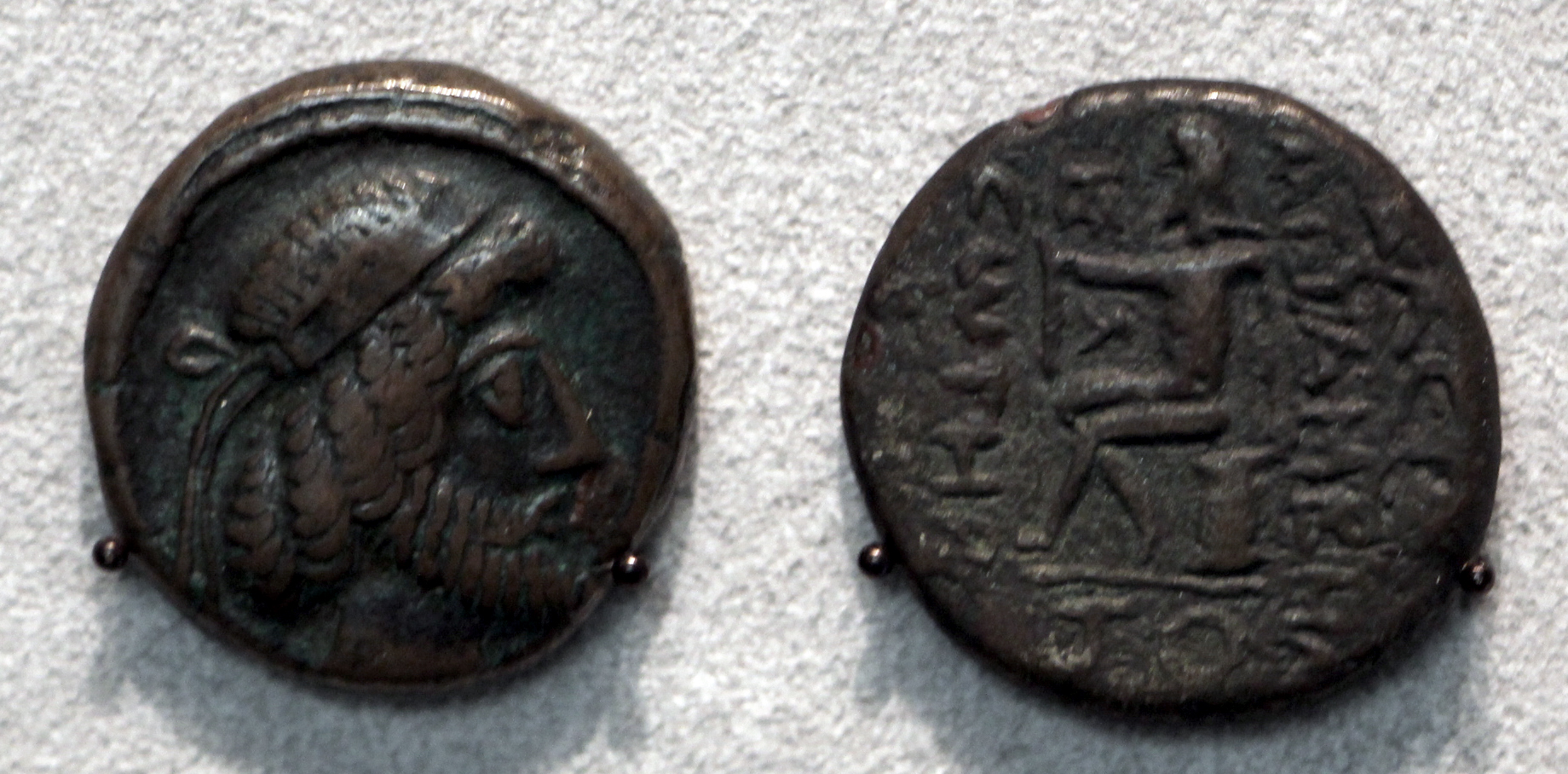
Tetradrachm of Attambelos IV

Attambelos IV of Characene was a first century ruler of the state of Characene, centered on the northern end of the Persian Gulf. His capital was probably Charax.

He ruled from 54/55-64/65; but he is known only from coins he minted.
