= Vonones of Sakastan =

Vonones
- King of Kings
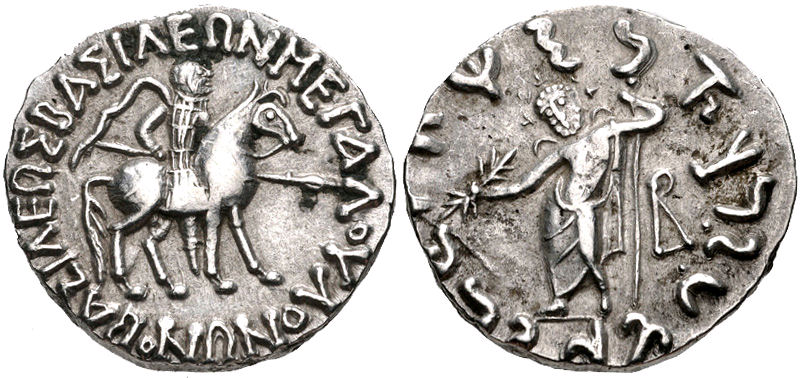
- Silver tetradrachm minted under Vonones, with the legend of his name and his commander Spalahores. Obverse with Greek legend: ΒΑΣΙΛΕΩΣ ΒΑΣΙΛΕΩΝ ΜΕΓΑΛΟΥ ΟΝΩΝΟΥ, "Of the King of Kings the Great Vonones".

King of Sakastan
- Reign: 75–57 BCE
- Predecessor: Unknown
- Successor: Spalahores
- Died: 57 BCE

Vonones, also spelled Vovones (Greek: ΟΝΩΝΟΥ Onōnou) was an Iranian king, who ruled Sakastan from 75 BCE to 57 BCE. During the latter part of his reign, he extended his rule as far as Taxila in north India, minting coins with the title of King of Kings. Vonones was a rival of the first Indo-Scythian monarch Maues (r. 98/85–60/57 BC), who also claimed the title of King of Kings. Both of them fought for power over the regions of Arachosia, the Kabul Valley, Ghadhara and Taxila.

Vonones' origins are uncertain. His name (lit. meaning "victor") was of Parthian origin, used by the royal Arsacid family of Iran. Because of this, arguments have been made in favour of a Parthian Surenid origin. According to the Iranologist Khodadad Rezakhani, Vonones belonged to the royal Arsacid family. Others, however, claim that he was an Indo-Scythian, regardless of his Parthian name. The legend of Vonones' coins also had the name of two of his commanders Spalahores and Spalirisos, who are referred to as "brother of the king". Scholars such as R.C. Senior and Rezakhani consider the two figures to indeed be Vonones' brothers, while others such as K.W. Dobbins argue that it was an honorific title given to them, whom he considered to be Saka satraps. (Note: Rezakhani has additionally suggested that Spalahores may simply have been a military title used by Vonones.)

A major argument against the proposal of a blood relationship between Vonones and the two commanders was due to both of them having Saka names, contrary to Vonones' Parthian name. Saghi Gazerani has suggested that after the Arsacid re-conquest of Sakastan (sometime between 124 BCE and 115 BCE), which was given as a fiefdom to the Surenid general that led the expedition, the Surenids (who became independent after 88 BCE) and the Sakas became closely connected, presumably through alliances and intermarriages. Indeed, the Parthians and Sakas are often confused in Indian literature. The mythological Iranian hero Rostam (who was from Sakastan), is mentioned in Iranian traditions as both Parthian and Saka, thus supporting this dual-identity.

Vonones was succeeded by Spalahores. The latter's son and successor, Spalagadames, has been suggested by Rezakhani to be the same figure as the first Indo-Parthian king, Gondophares (r. 19–46 CE).

== Sources ==
- Gazerani, Saghi (2015). The Sistani Cycle of Epics and Iran's National History: On the Margins of Historiography. BRILL. pp. 1–250. ISBN 9789004282964.
- Rezakhani, Khodadad (2017). "East Iran in Late Antiquity". ReOrienting the Sasanians: East Iran in Late Antiquity. Edinburgh University Press. pp. 1–256. ISBN 9781474400305. JSTOR 10.3366/j.ctt1g04zr8. (registration required)

Unknown	King of Sakastan; 75–57 BCE	Succeeded by Spalahores
