= Spalagadames =

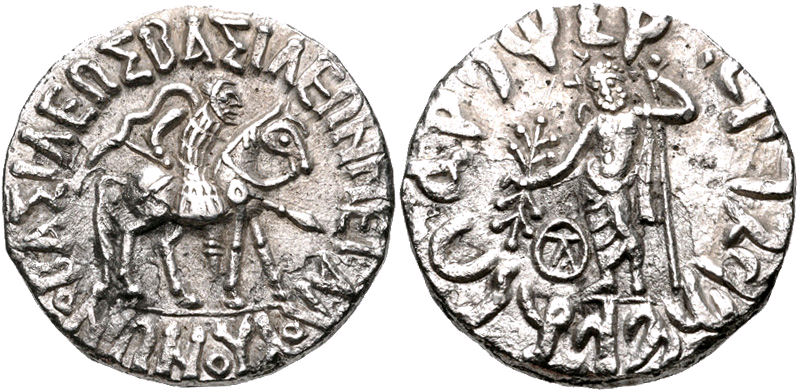
Silver tetradrachm of king Vonones mentioning his nephew Spalagadames, son of his brother Spalahores

Spalagadames (Kharosthi: 𐨭𐨿𐨤𐨫𐨒𐨡𐨨 Śpa-la-ga-da-ma, Śpalagadama) was an Iranian king, who ruled Sakastan in the last quarter of the 1st-century BC after his father Spalahores, who was himself possibly a brother of king Vonones. Spalagadames has been suggested by the Iranologist Khodadad Rezakhani to be the same figure as the first Indo-Parthian king Gondophares (r. 19–46 CE).

== Name ==
Spalagadames's name is attested on his coins in the Kharosthi form Śpalagadama (𐨭𐨿𐨤𐨫𐨒𐨡𐨨), which is derived from the Saka name *Spalagadama, meaning "commander of army".

== Sources ==
- Gazerani, Saghi (2015). The Sistani Cycle of Epics and Iran's National History: On the Margins of Historiography. BRILL. pp. 1–250. ISBN 9789004282964.
- Rezakhani, Khodadad (2017). "East Iran in Late Antiquity". ReOrienting the Sasanians: East Iran in Late Antiquity. Edinburgh University Press. pp. 1–256. ISBN 9781474400305. JSTOR 10.3366/j.ctt1g04zr8. (registration required)

Preceded by Spalahores	King of Sakastan; 1st-century BC	Succeeded by Gondophares
