= Farn-Sasan =

3rd-century Indo-Parthian king of Sakastan

- King of Kings
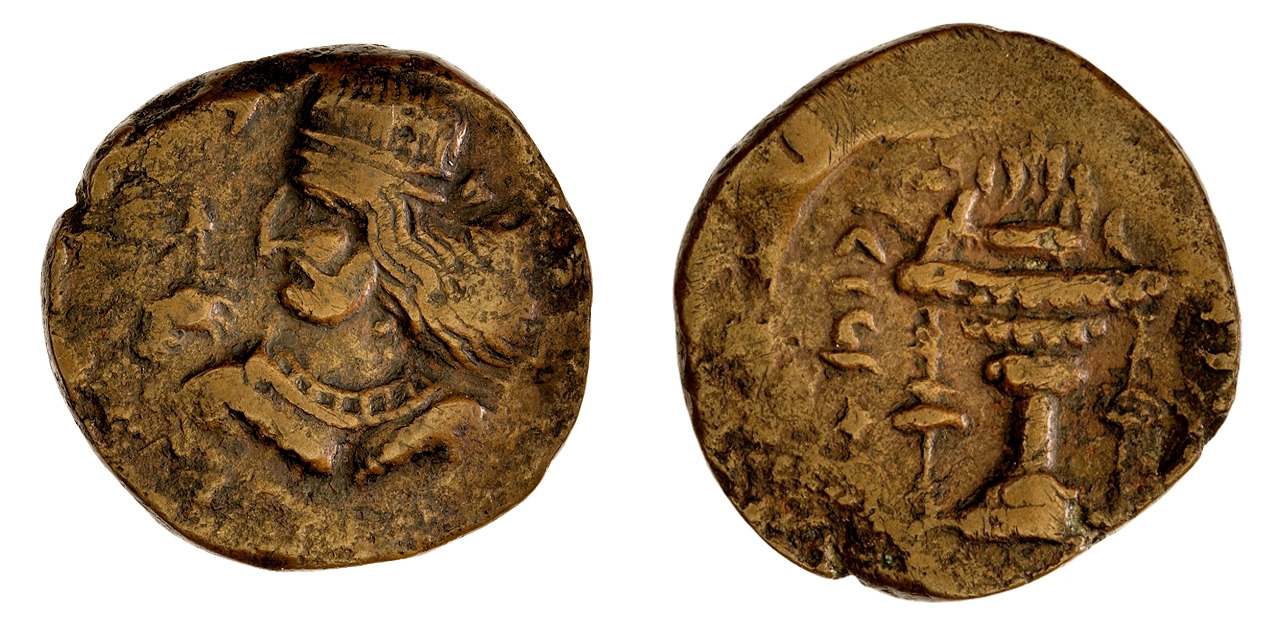
- Bronze coin of Farn-Sasan. He is depicted on the obverse, while the reverse depicts a fire altar.

King of the Indo-Parthian Kingdom
- Reign: 210–226
- Predecessor: Unknown
- Successor: Ardashir I (Sasanian Empire)
- Died: 226
- House: House of Gondophares
- Father: Adur-Sasan
- Religion: Zoroastrianism

Farn-Sasan was the last king of the Indo-Parthian Kingdom, ruling the region of Sakastan approximately from 210 to 226. Literary sources makes no mention of him, and he is only known through the coins he issued. He was defeated in 226 by the Sasanian ruler Ardashir I (r. 224–242), which marked the end of Indo-Parthian rule.

== Etymology ==
The main part of the name "Sasan" was popular in the Indo-Parthian realm. The etymology of the name is uncertain; according to scholars David Neil MacKenzie and V.A. Livshits the name is derived from Old Iranian *Sāsāna ("defeating enemy"). It was the name of a local Zoroastrian deity venerated in Indo-Parthia and Khwarazm. Farn-Sasan's name is mentioned in some of Islamic sources in the forms of "Ssan-Ĥorrah" (سْسَن‌خُرَه) and "Sis-Ĥorrah" (سیس‌خُرَه).

== Biography ==
Farn-Sasan gained control of the Indo-Parthian throne sometime in 210. The identity of his predecessor is unknown; it may have been Pacores. Farn-Sasan is not mentioned in any literary sources, and is only solely known through his coins, which have the inscription; "Farn-Sasan, son of Adur-Sasan, grandson of Tirdat, son of the grandson of Sanabares, the King of Kings." (Note: Until recently, Farn-Sasan's name was misinterpreted as "Ardamitra".) With this inscription, Farn-Sasan tried to legitimize his rule by linking himself with his great-grandfather Sanabares, who was the last prominent Indo-Parthian king. Although the title of King of Kings is put after the name of Sanabares, Farn-Sasan in reality refers himself as King of Kings, which was the traditional titulature of the Achaemenid and Parthian rulers.

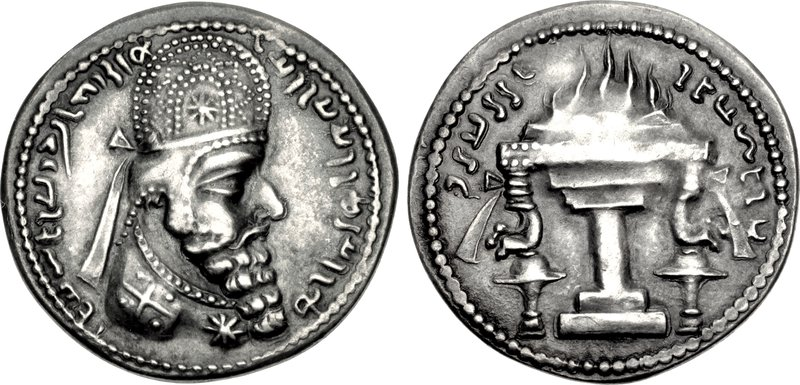
Coin of the Sasanian monarch Ardashir I (r. 224–242), minted at Hamadan between 226–230

Neither Adur-Sasan nor Tirdat is known to have ruled, which implies that Farn-Sasan was seemingly from a cadet branch of the dynasty. On the obverse of his coins, he is portrayed with a cap. On the reverse, a fire altar is depicted, with an inscription circled around it. Farn-Sasan is the only king known to show a fire altar on coins originating from Sakastan. Around the same time, another king issued coins with a similar fire-altar depicted on it, which was the Sasanian ruler Ardashir I (r. 224–242), who around the same time was extending his domains into the east. It is uncertain if Farn-Sasan copied the iconography of Ardashir I's reverse coins, or vice versa. The resemblance of the coinage of Farn-Sasan and the Sasanian Ardashir I, including the shared name Sasan—a name popular in the Indo-Parthian realm—suggests that the Sasanians and Indo-Parthians possibly shared a common ancestry. Modern historians regard them as rivals and claimants to the title of King of Kings. The Iranologist Khodadad Rezakhani argues that Farn-Sasan was a superior of Ardashir I, and that the latter was only able to declare himself Kings of Kings after he defeated Farn-Sasan in 226, which marked the end of Indo-Parthian rule.

== Sources ==
- Daryaee, Touraj; Rezakhani, Khodadad (2016). From Oxus to Euphrates: The World of Late Antique Iran. H&S Media. pp. 1–126. ISBN 9781780835778.
- Kalani, Reza. 2017. Multiple Identification Alternatives for Two Sassanid Equestrians on Fīrūzābād I Relief: A Heraldic Approach. Tarikh Negar Monthly.
- Olbrycht, Marek Jan (2016). "Dynastic Connections in the Arsacid Empire and the Origins of the House of Sāsān". In Curtis, Vesta Sarkhosh; Pendleton, Elizabeth J.; Alram, Michael; Daryaee, Touraj (eds.). The Parthian and Early Sasanian Empires: Adaptation and Expansion. Oxbow Books. ISBN 9781785702082.
- Rezakhani, Khodadad (2017). ReOrienting the Sasanians: East Iran in Late Antiquity. Edinburgh University Press. pp. 1–256. ISBN 9781474400305.
