= Sanabares II =

- King of Sakastan
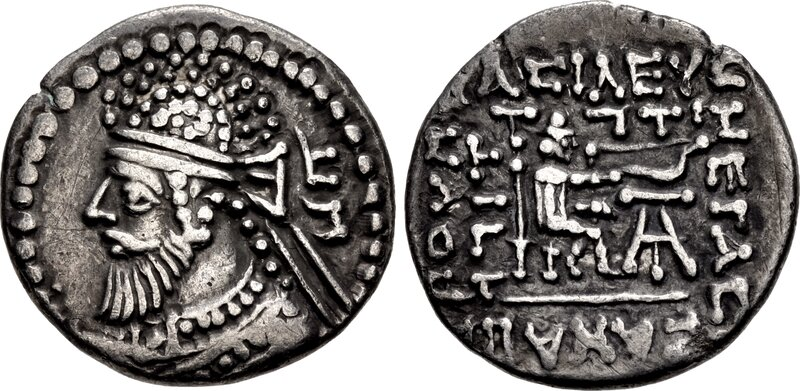
- Coinage of Sanabares, minted in Sakastan

King of Sakastan, King of the Indo-Parthian Kingdom
- Reign: 160–175 CE
- Predecessor: Sanabares
- Successor: Farn-Sasan (?)
- House: House of Gondophares

Sanabares II (160–175 CE) was an Indo-Parthian ruler of Sakastan. Sanabares II ruled the newly established Kingdom of Sakastan, following the partition of the remains of the Indo-Parthian kingdom into the realms of Sakastan and Turan. The kingdom of Sakastan covers the period from 160 to 230 CE. The kingdom of Turan was ruled by another king named Pahares I (160–230 CE).

Sanabares I succeeded in Sakastan the last of the major Indo-Parthian kings, Sanabares, in 160 CE.

The Kingdoms of Turan and Sakastan ended when they submitted to the Sasanian ruler Ardeshir I circa 230 CE. These events were recorded by Al-Tabari, describing the arrival of envoys to Ardeshir at Gor:

"Then he [Ardashir] marched back from the Sawad to Istakhr, from there east to Sagistan, then to Gurgan, then to Abrasahr, Merv, Balkh, and Khwarizm to the farthest boundaries of the provinces of Kohrasan, whereupon he returned to Merv. After he had killed many people and sent their heads to the Fire temple of Anahedh he returned from Merv to Pars and settled in Gor. Then envoys of the king of the Kushan, of the kings of Turan and Mokran came to him with declarations of their submission."

— Al-Tabari
