= Cheiroukes =

Cheiroukes XEIPOΥKOΣ
- Satrap of Marsakes
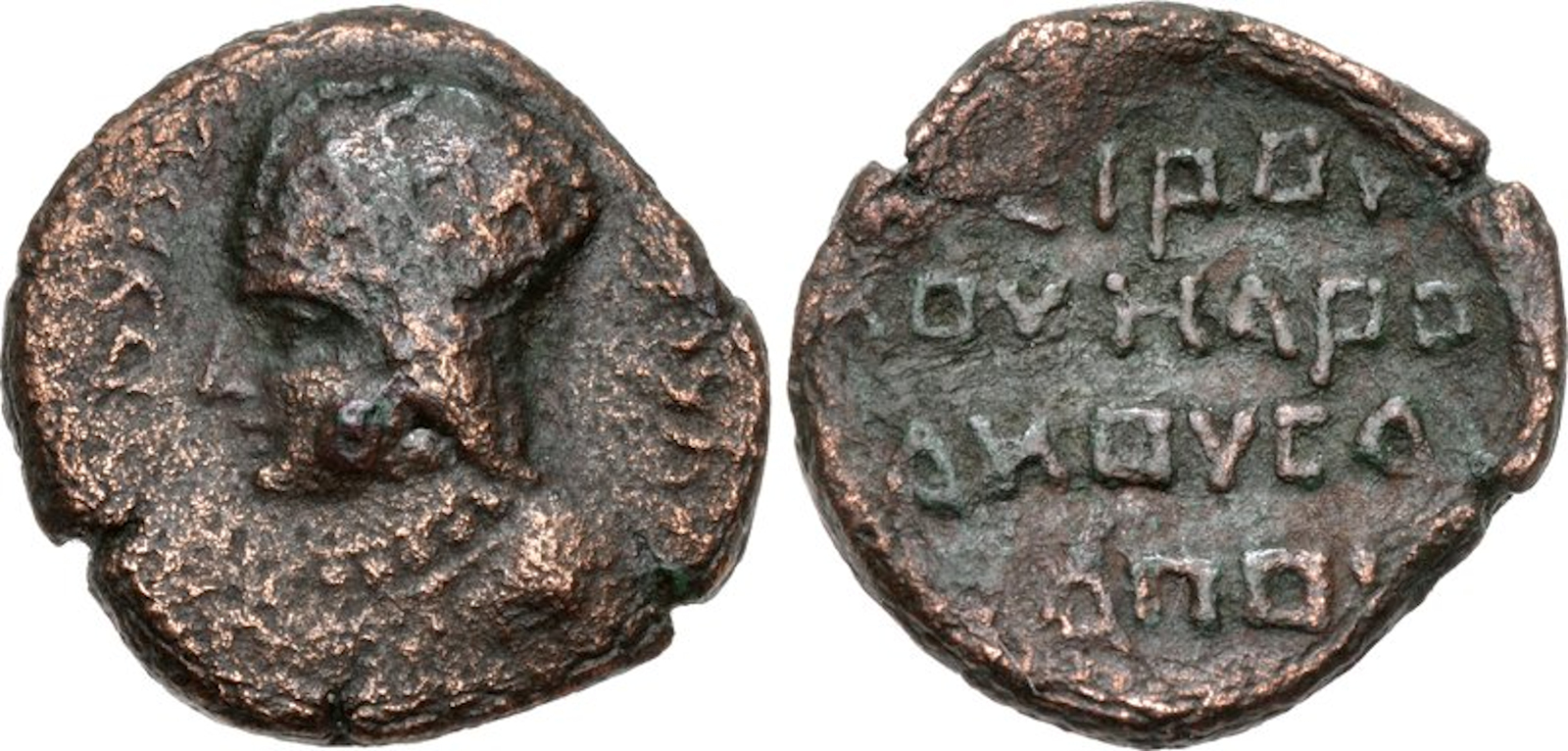
- Coinage of Cheiroukes, "Satrap of Marsakes", circa 50 BCE. He is beardless, and wearing the Parthian-style tiara with ear flap. Legend reconstructed from several coins: XEIPOΥKOY MAPΣAKOY CATPAΠOY "Of Cheiroukes, Satrap of Marzakes" (here [X]ЄIPOY/KOY HAPO/AKOY CA[T]/PAΠOY).
- Reign: circa 50 BCE

Cheiroukes (XEIPOΥKOΣ, ruled circa 50 BCE), was probably the governor of the Arsacid provinces of Sakastan and Arachosia. On his coinage, he presents himself as "Satrap" (CATPAΠOΣ) of the region of "Mazakes" (MAPΣAKOΣ), which covers the eastern provinces of the Arsacid Empire, which came to include Sakastan.

Cheiroukes might have been of Parthian, or perhaps of Saka origin. The Parthian Empire had been ruling the region of Sakastan since the victory of Mithridates II (124–88 BCE) over the Sakas, and these "Satraps" governed in the area until the establishment of the dynasty of Gondophares (19-46 CE).

Cheiroukes minted coins with his portrait. He was probably one of the Arsacid governors of the area, with others such as Tanlis Mardates, before the rise of the dynasty of the Indo-Parthian ruler Gondophares (r. 19–46).

A seal with the inscription "MAPΣAKOY" is otherwise known.

== Sources ==
- Rezakhani, Khodadad (2017). "East Iran in Late Antiquity". ReOrienting the Sasanians: East Iran in Late Antiquity. Edinburgh University Press. pp. 1–256. ISBN 9781474400305. JSTOR 10.3366/j.ctt1g04zr8. (registration required)
