= Gadana =

1st-century AD Indo-Parthian king

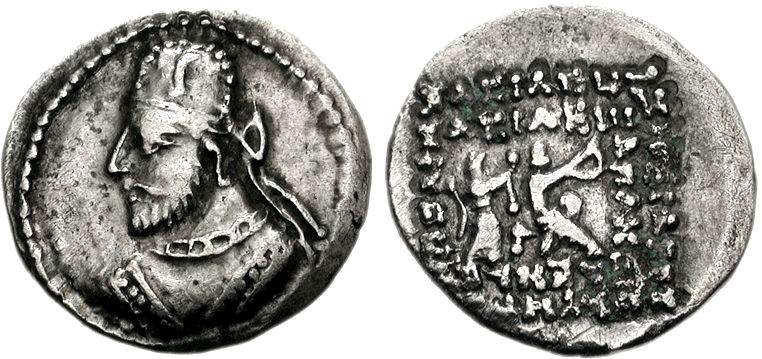
Coin of Orthagnes (Gondophares-Gadana). Seistan mint. Obv Bust of king. Rev Orthaganes, holding bow, seated right, being crowned by Nike.

Gondophares III Gudana (Kharosthi: 𐨒𐨂𐨡𐨥𐨪 𐨒𐨂𐨜𐨣 Gu-da-pha-ra Gu-ḍa-na, Gudaphara Guḍana), or Gadana, also called Orthagnes (Ancient Greek: ΟΡΘΑΓΝΗϹ Orthagnēs), was an Indo-Parthian king. He may have ruled circa 20–30 CE (25–55 CE according to Mitchiner). He was one of the successors of Gondophares, together with Abdagases, Sases, Gondophares II, Sarpedones, and Pacores. He may have ruled from Arachosia to Eastern Punjab.
