= Abdagases I =

1st-century Indo-Parthian king of Gandhara

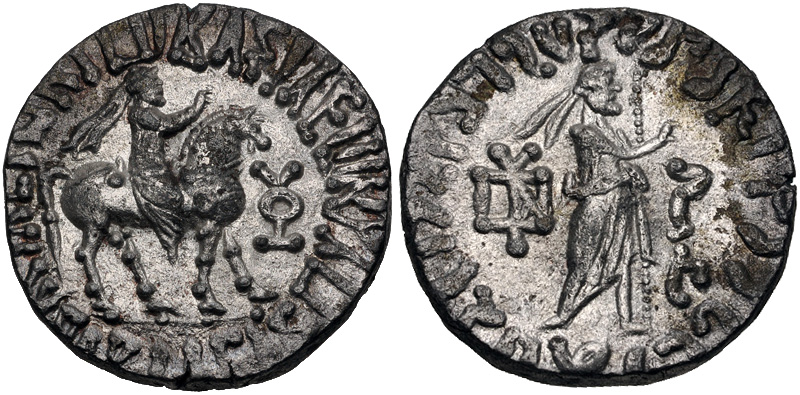
- Silver coin of Gondophares, minted in Gandhara. The front shows a king on horseback, raising his right hand, whilst the reverse shows Zeus raising his hand and holding a scepter.

Indo-Parthian king
- Reign: c. 46 – c. 60
- Predecessor: Gondophares
- Successor: Orthagnes or Pacores
- Died: 60
- House: House of Suren (?)
- Religion: Mithraism (?)

Abdagases I (Greek: Ἀβδαγάσης, epigraphically ΑΒΔΑΓΑΣΟΥ; Kharosthi: 𐨀𐨬𐨡𐨒𐨮 A-va-da-ga-ṣa, Avadagaṣa) was an Indo-Parthian king, who ruled Gandhara and possibly over most of the Indus region from c. 46 to 60 AD. He was a nephew and successor of Gondophares, who had laid foundations for the Indo-Parthian kingdom after revolting against his Arsacid overlords in c. 19 AD. Abdagases was succeeded by Orthaghnes or Pacores.

== Life ==
Abdagases' origins are unknown. It has been argued that he belonged to the House of Suren, a prominent and influential family within the Arsacid Empire. Because the title Gondophernes has been attributed to that dynasty without sufficient proof. But no other proof related to this argument has been found. He succeeded his uncle Gondophares as the ruler of Gandhara in c. 46 AD, whilst Orthagnes succeeded him at Drangiana and Arachosia. The figure of Abdagases is obscure; according to Gazerani, it is likely that Abdagases may have been the same person as another Abdagases, an influential and powerful Suren noble in the Arsacid Empire, who belonged to a faction of Parthian magnates that were dissatisfied with the Parthian king Artabanus II. The Parthian magnates had at first favoured a grandson of Phraates IV, also named Phraates as a better choice for king. However, he met an abrupt death in Syria. The Parthian magnates then turned to another prince, Tiridates III, who was crowned by Abdagases.

Some of the Parthian magnates, however, were supporters of Artabanus II, due to their concern that Abdagases would become the de facto ruler of the Arsacid Empire, with Tiridates as a figurehead. As a result, Abdagases and his son Sinnacus withdrew their support from Tiridates as well. This event seems to have coincided with the declaration of independence in Sakastan by the Suren family under Gondophares. The identification of the two Abdagases figures, although supported by some scholars, nevertheless still remains indecisive, due to the lack of numismatic evidence. Abdagases ruled as king until c. 60 AD, and was succeeded by Orthagnes or Pacores.

Abdagases has sometimes been identified as Misdaeus, who sentenced the Christian apostle Thomas to death, according to the Acts of Thomas.

== Notes ==
a: The faith of the House of Suren remains uninvestigated in current scholarship. Pourshariati has suggested a faith based on the worship of Mithra being practiced by some of the Parthian families.

== Sources ==
- Gazerani, Saghi (2015). The Sistani Cycle of Epics and Iran's National History: On the Margins of Historiography. BRILL. pp. 1–250. ISBN 9789004282964.
- Rezakhani, Khodadad (2017). ReOrienting the Sasanians: East Iran in Late Antiquity. Edinburgh University Press. pp. 1–256. ISBN 9781474400305.
- Brunner, C. J. (1982). "Abdagases". Encyclopaedia Iranica, Vol. I, Fasc. 2. p. 172.
