= Spalirisos =

Iranian king of the 1st century BCE

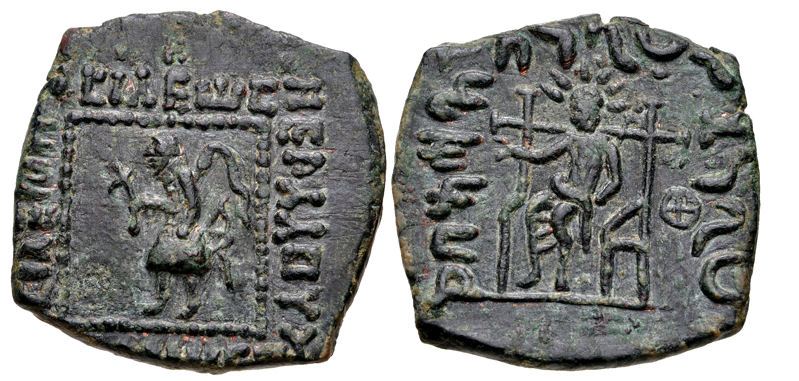
Coin of Spalirises as King of Kings

Spalirisos, also spelled Spalirises, (Greek: Σπαλιρίσης Spalirísēs, ϹΠΑΛΙΡΙϹΟΥ Spalirisou (epigraphic); Kharosthi: 𐨭𐨿𐨤𐨫𐨁𐨪𐨁𐨭 Śpa-li-ri-śa, Śpaliriśa) was an Iranian king who ruled Arachosia in the 1st century BCE.

== Name ==
Spalarisos's name is attested on his coins in the Greek form Spalirísēs (Σπαλιρίσης) and in the Kharosthi form Śpaliriśa (𐨭𐨿𐨤𐨫𐨁𐨪𐨁𐨭), which are derived from the Saka name *Spalarīźa, meaning "in command of army".

== Career ==
Before his rise to kingship, he served as a commander of Vonones of Sakastan, who had minted coins with his name and that of another commander, Spalahores, who are both referred to as "brother of the king". Scholars such as R.C. Senior and Khodadad Rezakhani consider Spalirisos and Spalahores to indeed be Vonones' brothers, while others such as K.W. Dobbins argue that it was an honorific title given to them, whom he considered to be Saka satraps. (Note: Rezakhani has additionally suggested that Spalahores may simply have been a military title used by Vonones.)

A major argument against the proposal of a blood relationship between Vonones and the two commanders was due to both of them having Saka names, contrary to Vonones' Parthian name. Saghi Gazerani has suggested that after the Arsacid re-conquest of Sakastan (sometime between 124–115 BC), which was given as a fiefdom to the Surenid general that led the expedition, the Surenids (who became independent after 88 BC) and Sakas became closely connected, presumably through alliances and intermarriages. Indeed, Parthians and Sakas are often mixed up in Indian literature. The mythological Iranian hero Rostam (who was from Sakastan), is mentioned in Iranian traditions as both Parthian and Saka, thus supporting this dual-identity.

== Sources ==
- Gazerani, Saghi (2015). The Sistani Cycle of Epics and Iran's National History: On the Margins of Historiography. BRILL. pp. 1–250. ISBN 9789004282964.
- Rezakhani, Khodadad (2017). "East Iran in Late Antiquity". ReOrienting the Sasanians: East Iran in Late Antiquity. Edinburgh University Press. pp. 1–256. ISBN 9781474400305. JSTOR 10.3366/j.ctt1g04zr8. (registration required)

Preceded by Spalahores	Indo-Scythian Ruler; 50–47 BCE	Succeeded by Azes I
