= Ubouzanes =

1st-century ruler of the Indo-Parthian Kingdom of Arachosia

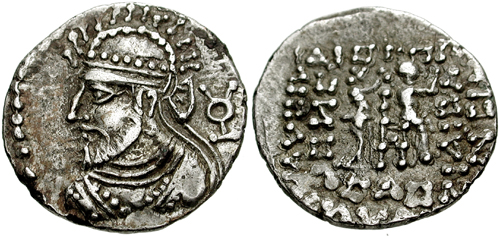
Coin of the Indian-Parthian king Ubouzanes

Ubouzanes (Greek: ΥΒΟΥΖΑΝΗϹ Ubouzanēs (epigraphic)) was a ruler of the remnants of the Indo-Parthian Kingdom in Arachosia in the first century CE. He was the son of Orthagnes. He was unknown until the late 20th century when a hoard of coins was found in Jammu. Numismatist Joe Cribb first analyzed them in 1985, discovering some belonged to a new ruler. Cribb placed him between Orthagnes and Pacores.
