= Sarpedones =

Indian King

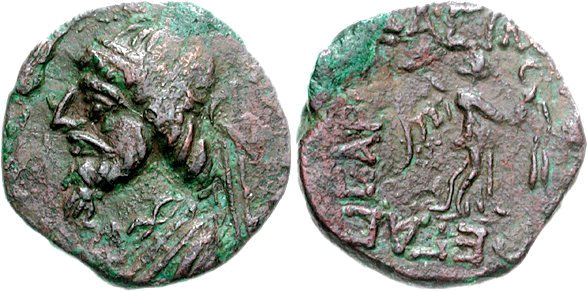
Coin of Sarpedones. Diademed and draped bust left; tamgha before Rev Nike standing left, holding wreath and palm.

Sarpedones, also spelled Sarpadones (Kharosthi: 𐨯𐨤𐨅𐨡𐨞 Sa-pe-da-ṇa, Sapedaṇa) was an Indo-Parthian king. He was a lieutenant or kinsman of Gondophares, and ruled the region of Sakastan, where he had coins minted with the title of King of Kings.

== Sources ==
- Rezakhani, Khodadad (2017). "East Iran in Late Antiquity". ReOrienting the Sasanians: East Iran in Late Antiquity. Edinburgh University Press. pp. 1–256. ISBN 9781474400305. JSTOR 10.3366/j.ctt1g04zr8. (registration required)
