= Tanlis Mardates =

Tanlis Mardates ΤΑΝΛΙC ΜΑΙΔΑTΗC
- Satrap
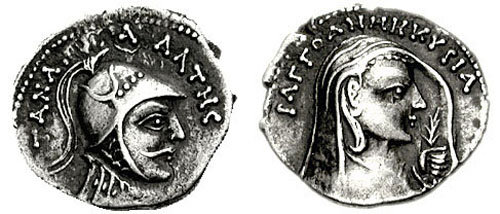
- Coinage of Tanlis Mardates (ΤΑΝΛΙC ΜΑΙΔΑTΗC) with Rangodeme (ΡΑΓΓΟΔΗΜΗ ΚΥΡΙΑ).
- Reign: circa 80-40 BC

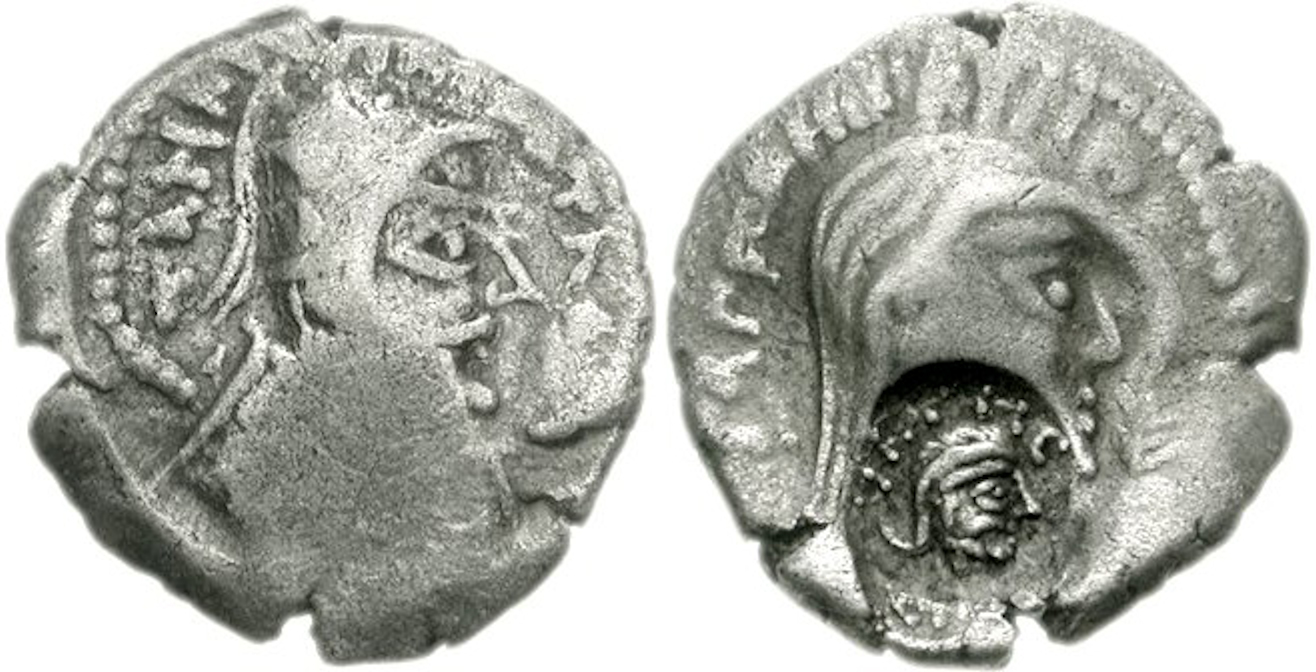
Coin of Tanlis Mardates, with a round countermark on the profile of Rangodeme, representing a portrait with (ΤΑΝΛΙC ....) around.

Tanlis Mardates, or Tanlis Maidates (ΤΑΝΛΙC ΜΑΙΔΑTΗC, ruled circa 80-40 BC), was the governor of the Arsacid provinces of Sakastan and Arachosia. He might have been of Parthian, or perhaps of Saka origin. The Parthian Empire had been ruling the region of Sakastan since the victory of Mithridates II (124–88 BCE) over the Sakas, and these "Satraps" (another one was probably Cheiroukes) governed in the area until the establishment of the dynasty of Gondophares (19-46 CE).

Tanlis Mardates minted coins with portraits of him and a certain Rangodeme, probably his wife. He was probably the last Arsacid governor of the area before the rise of the dynasty of the Indo-Parthian ruler Gondophares (r. 19–46).

He ruled west of the territory of Sapadbizes.

The portrait from his coinage is thought to illustrate the armour and headgear of Parthian cataphracts: his coins show a low, oval helmet, with a neckguard and a plume.

== Sources ==
- Rezakhani, Khodadad (2017). "East Iran in Late Antiquity". ReOrienting the Sasanians: East Iran in Late Antiquity. Edinburgh University Press. pp. 1–256. ISBN 9781474400305. JSTOR 10.3366/j.ctt1g04zr8. (registration required)
