= Arsacid dynasty (disambiguation) =

The Arsacid dynasty was an Iranian royal dynasty that ruled Parthia, in modern-day Iran, from 247 BC to 224 AD.

Arsacid dynasty may also refer to:

- Arsacid dynasty of Armenia (54–428), Armenia
- Arsacid dynasty of Iberia (c. 189–284), Georgian Iberia
- Arsacid dynasty of Caucasian Albania (1st–5th century), Caucasian Albania

== See also ==
- List of rulers of Parthian sub-kingdoms
