= Sanabares =

Indo-Parthian king of Sakastan from 135 to 160

- King
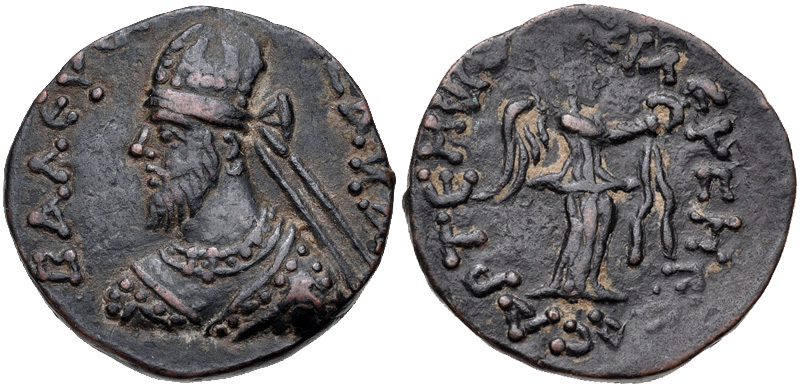
- Coinage of Sanabares, Gondopharid Dynasty

King of the Indo-Parthian Kingdom
- Predecessor: Pacores
- Successor: Pahares I (Turan); Sanabares II (Sakastan)
- Born: 135
- Died: 160 AD
- House: House of Gondophares

Sanabares (Greek: ϹΑΝΑΒΑΡΟΥ Sanabarou; 135–160 CE) was an Indo-Parthian king. He was the last Indo-Parthian king to rule in both Sakastan and south Arachosia, as the Kushans under Wima Kadphises made inroads into Indo-Parthian territory. From 160 CE, the remains of the Indo-Parthian kingdom were partitioned between Turan, under Pahares I, and Sakastan under Sanabares II. following the partition of the remains of the Indo-Parthian kingdom into the realms of and Turan. The kingdom of Turan covers the period from 160 to 230 CE.

In his coinage, Sabares introduced a close-fitting Parthian-style tiara for his portraiture, a characteristic which was later continued by Pahares I. On the reverse has a figure of Nike walking.

A Sanabares II seems to have ruled in Sakastan from 160 to 230 CE.

Sanabares' name is mentioned in an Islamic source in the form of "Sisanābruh" (سیسنابروه).

== Sources ==
- Olbrycht, Marek Jan (2016). "Dynastic Connections in the Arsacid Empire and the Origins of the House of Sāsān". In Curtis, Vesta Sarkhosh; Pendleton, Elizabeth J.; Alram, Michael; Daryaee, Touraj (eds.). The Parthian and Early Sasanian Empires: Adaptation and Expansion. Oxbow Books. ISBN 9781785702082.
- Rezakhani, Khodadad (2017). "East Iran in Late Antiquity". ReOrienting the Sasanians: East Iran in Late Antiquity. Edinburgh University Press. pp. 1–256. ISBN 9781474400305. JSTOR 10.3366/j.ctt1g04zr8. (registration required)
