= Pahares I =

- King of Turan
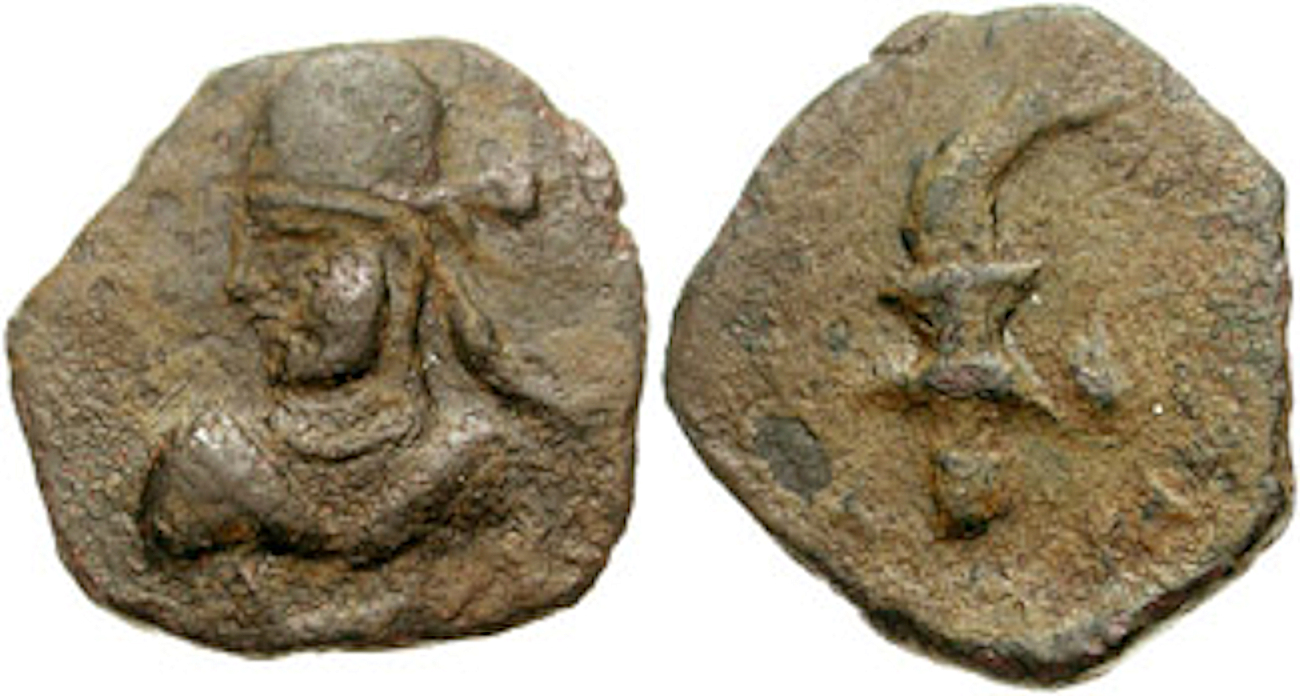
- Coinage of Pahares I, king of Turan (circa 160–230 CE). Bearded bust left, wearing Parthian-style tiara. Crude figure of Nike walking right

King of Turan, King of the Indo-Parthian Kingdom
- Reign: 160–230 CE
- Predecessor: Sanabares
- Successor: Ardashir I (Sasanian Empire)
- Died: 230
- House: House of Gondophares

Pahares I (160–230 CE) was an Indo-Parthian ruler of Turan. Pahares ruled the newly established Kingdom of Turan, following the partition of the remains of the Indo-Parthian kingdom into the realms of Sakastan and Turan. The kingdom of Turan covers the period from 160 to 230 CE. The kingdom of Sakastan was ruled by a second king with the name Sanabares (160–175 CE).

Pahares succeeded the last of the major Indo-Parthian kings, Sanabares, in 160 CE.

In his coinage, he wears a Parthian-style tiara, a close-fitting headress in the style introduced by Sanabares, and the reverse has a figure of Nike walking.

The Kingdoms of Turan and Sakastan ended when they submitted to the Sasanian ruler Ardeshir I circa 230 CE. These events were recorded by Al-Tabari, describing the arrival of envoys to Ardeshir at Gor:

"Then he [Ardashir] marched back from the Sawad to Istakhr, from there east to Sagistan, then to Gurgan, then to Abrasahr, Merv, Balkh, and Khwarizm to the farthest boundaries of the provinces of Kohrasan, whereupon he returned to Merv. After he had killed many people and sent their heads to the Fire temple of Anahedh he returned from Merv to Pars and settled in Gor. Then envoys of the king of the Kushan, of the kings of Turan and Mokran came to him with declarations of their submission."

— Al-Tabari
