= Khodadad Rezakhani =

Iranian historian (born 1976)

- Born: 1976 (age 49–50); Tehran, Iran
- Education: PhD in Late Antique History of the Sassanid Empire from UCLA; MSc Global History from the London School of Economics (LSE); Indo-European Studies and Iranian Languages at UC Berkeley, UCLA and SOAS
- Known for: History of Central Asia

Khodadad Rezakhani (Persian: خداداد رضاخانی, Persian pronunciation: [xo̯dʌdʌd rɛzʌxʌni] born 1976) is an Iranian historian of late antique Central and West Asia. He has been associate research scholar at The Sharmin and Bijan Mossavar-Rahmani Center for Iran and Persian Gulf Studies Princeton University from 2016 to 2020. He is a researcher at the Austrian Academy of Sciences since September 2025.

== Early life and education ==
Rezakhani was born in Tehran, Iran and was educated in Europe and Iran before moving to the United States. He later moved back to London, UK where he earned his MSc in History from London School of Economics and a PhD in Late Antique/Middle Eastern History from UCLA with a dissertation titled Empires and Microsystems : Late Antique Regional Economy in Central and West Asia, 500-750 under the supervision of Michael G. Morony and advised by Patrick J. Geary, Claudia Rapp, and Sanjay Subrahmanyam. Because of his multicultural background and education, Rezakhani is fluent in English, Persian and a number of other research and modern languages.

== Academic career ==
Since earning his PhD, Rezakhani became a research officer at the London School of Economics where he worked on an ERC funded project, Useful and Reliable Knowledge in Global Histories of Material Progress in the East and the West (URKEW). He also taught as a teaching fellow the LSE, SOAS, and AKU, as well as a visiting assistant professor at the University of Nevada, Reno.

From 2014 to 2016, he was an Alexander von Humboldt Stiftung fellow at the Freie Universität, Berlin. Since 2016, he has been an associate research scholar and lecturer at Princeton University.

Rezakhani has also been involved in various projects for the academic study of late antique Iran and Central Asia, as well as Global Late Antiquity. He is the founder and manager of rotating Twitter accounts Tweeting Historians and Historians of Iran, which aim to promote the works of the historians of Iranian and global history by presenting their work in form of weekly tweets concerned with each scholar's research. He is also the founder and author of Iranologie.com, a site dedicated to the history of Iran since 1997.

== Scholarship ==
Rezakhani is a Global historian who has published on Late Antique Iran and Central Asia, particularly Sasanian history. Educated initially in philology (including Indo-European Studies) and medieval history, Rezakhani's work encompasses comparative approaches to World History, using Central and West Asia as areas of focus and encompassing matters of culture, language, and economic and political history. Chronologically, Rezakhani's research is most concerned with the first millennium, particularly the period of transition from late antiquity to Early Islam.

Rezakhani's interest in Central Asian history has also resulted in works concerned with the historiography of the Silk Road and its creation in 19th century Europe as part of colonial historiography. His denial of the concept of the Silk Road, reflected in his article on the subject, the Road that Never Was. His monograph on the history of Central Asia, called ReOrienting the Sasanians, provided a political history of Central Asia (including Afghanistan and Transoxiana) from the Indo-Parthian period to the coming of Islam, and included the history of the Kushans, Iranian Huns, the Kidarites, Hephthalites, Nezak Shah, and the Western Turk Empire. In 2018, the book was the recipient of the Honourable Mention in the Ehsan Yarshater Book Award.

Rezakhani's contribution to the critiques of concepts prevalent in both academic history-writing and popular historical imagination about Iran and Asia, including the idea of Iranians as "Aryans", Nowruz as an "Indo-European" tradition, representations of "the Ancients" in contemporary Iranian discourse and other subjects.

He is a regular contributor to Iranian and English media, with contributions to BBC Persian, VOA Persian and Radio Farda, as well as to popular history journals such as History Today. Rezakhani runs the History of Iran podcast and is an editor at the Sasanika Project.

== Publications ==
=== Books ===
- ReOrienting the Sasanians: East Iran in Late Antiquity (Edinburgh University Press, 2017);
- The Anonymous Syriac Chronicle Known as the Chronicle of Khuzistan (Rūydādnāme-ye Khūzestān) (Hekmat-e Sina, 2016).
- (with Touraj Daryaee)From Oxus to Euphrates: The World of Late Antique Iran (H&S Media, 2016)
- (editor)Excavating an Empire: Achaemenid Persia in Longue Durée (with Touraj Daryaee and Ali Mousavi, Mazda Publishers, 2014)
- Iranians on the Silk Road: Merchants, Kingdoms, and Religions (with Matteo Compareti, 2010)

=== Selected articles ===
==== Popular media ====
- Arab Conquests and Sasanian Iran (History Today)
- Reza Shah's Mummy, back from the dead, haunts Iranian politics (Ajam Media)

==== Academic journals ====
- The Road that Never Was: the Silk Road and Trans-Eurasian Exchange
- The Rebellion of Babak and the Historiography of Southern Caucasus.
- West Asia, 600-900
- From Miirosan to Khurasan: Huns, Alkhans, and the Creation of East Iran
- Markets for Land, Labour and Capital in Late Antique Iraq, AD 200-700 (with Michael Morony)
- Mazdakism, Manichaeism and Zoroastrianism: In search of orthodoxy and heterodoxy in late antique Iran
- Continuity and Change in Late Antique Irān: An Economic View of the Sasanians
