= Pacores =

2nd-century ruler of the Indo-Parthian Kingdom of Arachosia

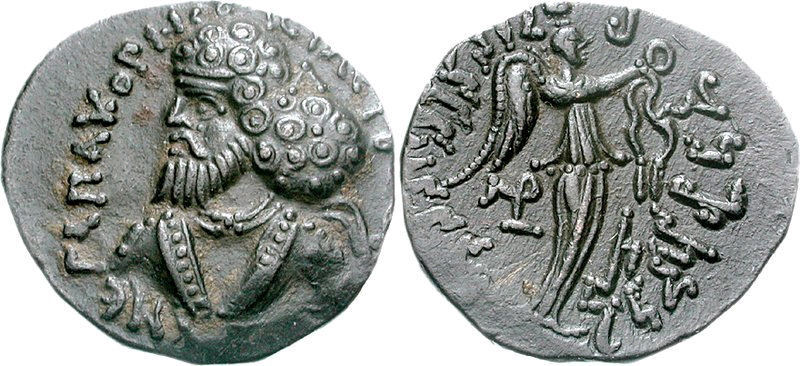
Coin of Pakores. Obv Bust of king with Greek legend ΒΑΣΙΛΕΥΣ (ΒΑΣΙΛΕΩΝ) ΝΕΓΑ ΠΑΚΟΡΗΣ. Rev Nike standing right, holding a victory wreath. Kharoshthi legend.

Pacores or Pakores (Greek: ΠΑΚΟΡΗϹ Pakorēs; Kharosthi: 𐨤𐨐𐨂𐨪 Pa-ku-ra, Pakura; Aramaic: 𐡐𐡊𐡅𐡓𐡉 pkwry) (100–135 AD) was a king who ruled the remnants of the Indo-Parthian Kingdom in Arachosia from 100–130 AD following Ubouzanes. He is well-known from coins minted in Seistan and Kandahar, mostly silver drachms and tetradrachms. The time of his reign can be determined as many of his coins overstrike those of Vima Takto.

He is the last well attested ruler. After his coins there is a single surviving coin with the name Abdagases II and a set of poorly made Indo-Parthian coins with unnamed rulers before the Kushan Empire conquered it.
