= Indo-Parthian kingdom =

19–226 CE kingdom in northwestern South Asia

- 19 CE–226 CE
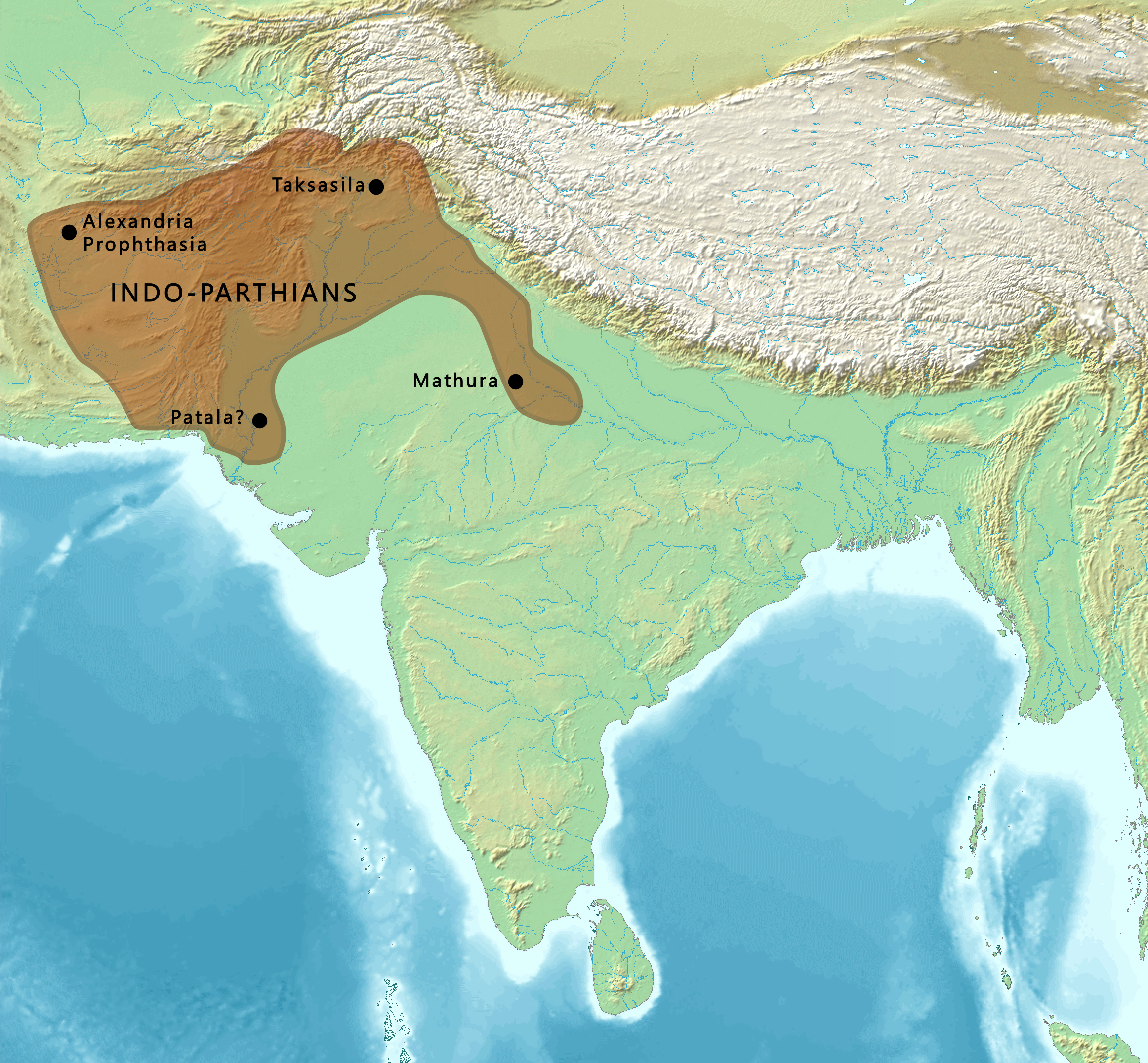
- Indo-Parthian kingdom at its maximum extent, circa 40 CE, and neighbouring South Asian polities.
- Capital: Taxila
- Common languages: Aramaic; Greek; Gandhārī Prakrit (Kharoshthi script); Sanskrit, Prakrit (Brahmi script), Parthian
- Religion: Buddhism; Hinduism; Zoroastrianism
- Government: Monarchy
- King
  - 19–46: Gondophares I (first)
  - ?–226: Farn-Sasan (last)
- Historical era: Antiquity
  - Gondophares I: 19 CE
  - Disestablished: 226 CE
Preceded by
Parthian Empire
Indo-Greek Kingdom
Indo-Scythians
Northern Satraps
Succeeded by
Paratarajas
Kushan Empire
Sasanian Empire

The Indo-Parthian kingdom, also known as Pahlavas in the ancient Sanskrit texts, was a syncretic state founded by Gondophares I in the first century CE. At its zenith, Gondophares ruled an area which today covers parts of eastern Iran, parts of Afghanistan, most of Pakistan and parts of northwestern India. Indo-Parthians continued to rule in some areas until 226 CE, with Paratarajas continuing until late 3rd century.

The kingdom was founded in 19/20 when the governor of Drangiana (Sakastan) Gondophares I declared independence from the Parthian Empire. He would later make expeditions to the east, conquer territory from the Indo-Scythians and Indo-Greeks and thus transforming his kingdom into an empire. (Note: "As a result, the Indo-Greek kingdom emerged to the south but it did not exist long and was soon replaced by the Indo-Parthian kingdom.") The domains of the Indo-Parthians were greatly reduced following the invasions of the Kushans in the second half of the 1st century. They managed to retain control of Sakastan, until its conquest by the Sasanian Empire in c. 224/5. In Baluchistan, the Paratarajas, a local Indo-Parthian dynasty, fell into the orbit of the Sasanian Empire circa 262 CE.

The Indo-Parthians are noted for the construction of the Buddhist monastery Takht-i-Bahi (a UNESCO World Heritage Site) in Mardan, Pakistan.

== Name ==
The name "Indo-Parthian" is given by modern scholars to a royal dynasty whose members were loosely related to each other. The dynasty was also called "Pahlavas" in Puranic and Mahabharata texts. Its rulers may have been members of the House of Suren, and the kingdom has even been called the "Suren Kingdom" by some authors.

== History ==
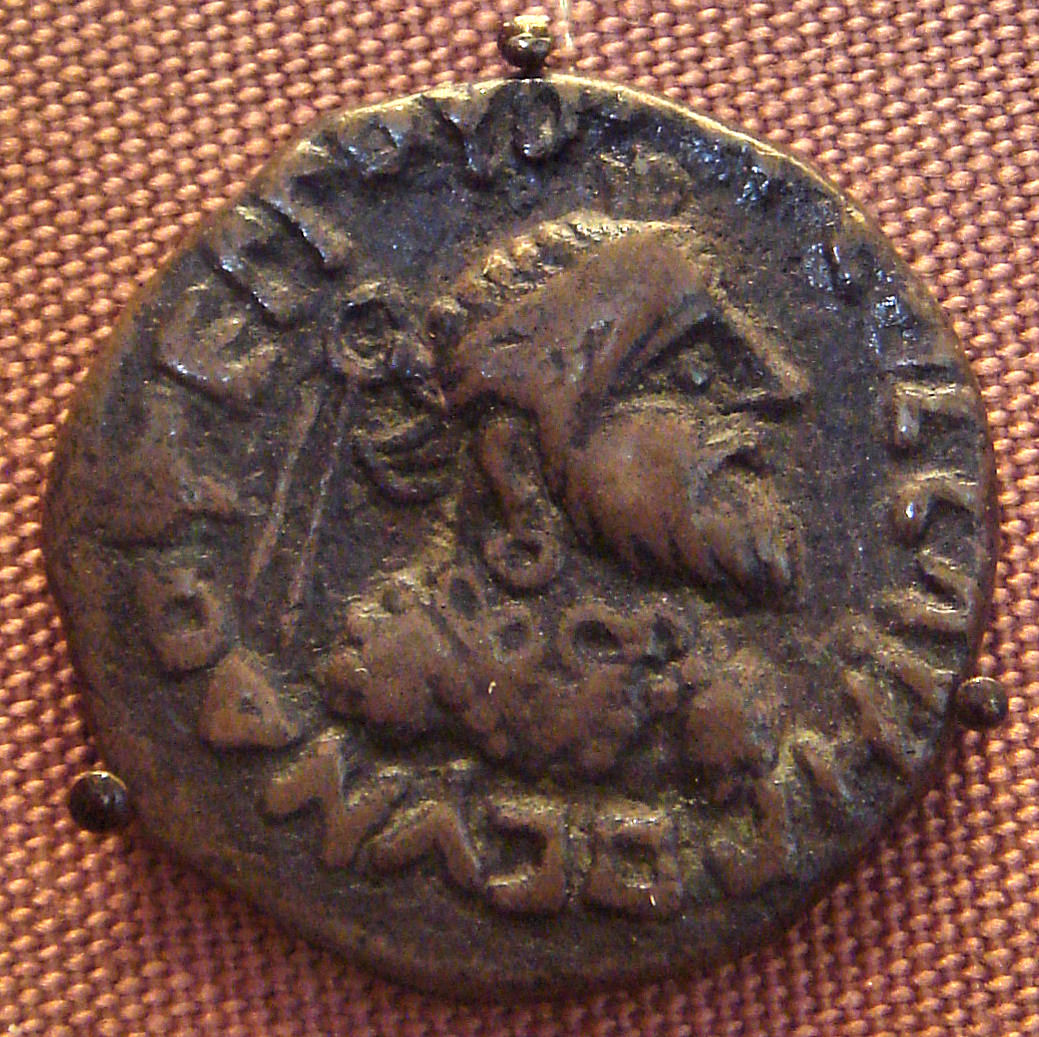
Portrait of Gondophares, founder of the Indo-Parthian kingdom. He wears a headband, earrings, a necklace, and a cross-over jacket with round decorations.

Gondophares I originally appears to have been a ruler of Seistan, in what is today eastern Iran. He may have replaced previous Parthian governors of Seistan, such as Cheiroukes or Tanlismaidates. These Parthian satraps had been ruling the region of Sakastan since the time when Mithridates II (124–88 BCE) had vanquished the Sakas of the region.

The dating of the rule of Gondophares I spans mid 1st century BCE to the first half of 1st century CE. According to the chronology advocated by Robert Senior, Gondophares made conquests in the former Indo-Scythian kingdom in around 20–10 BCE, perhaps after the death of their important ruler Azes; the scholars recognising the existence of the so-called Azes II, date his reign between 19 and 46 CE. He became the ruler of areas comprising Arachosia, Seistan, Sindh, Punjab, and the Kabul valley, but it does not seem as though he held territory beyond eastern Punjab. Gondophares called himself "King of Kings", a Parthian title that in his case correctly reflects that the Indo-Parthian empire was only a loose framework: a number of smaller dynasts certainly maintained their positions during the Indo-Parthian period, likely in exchange for their recognition of Gondophares and his successors. These smaller dynasts included the Apracarajas and Indo-Scythian satraps such as Zeionises and Rajuvula, as well as anonymous Scythians who struck imitations of Azes coins. The Ksaharatas also held sway in Gujarat, perhaps just outside Gondophares' dominions.

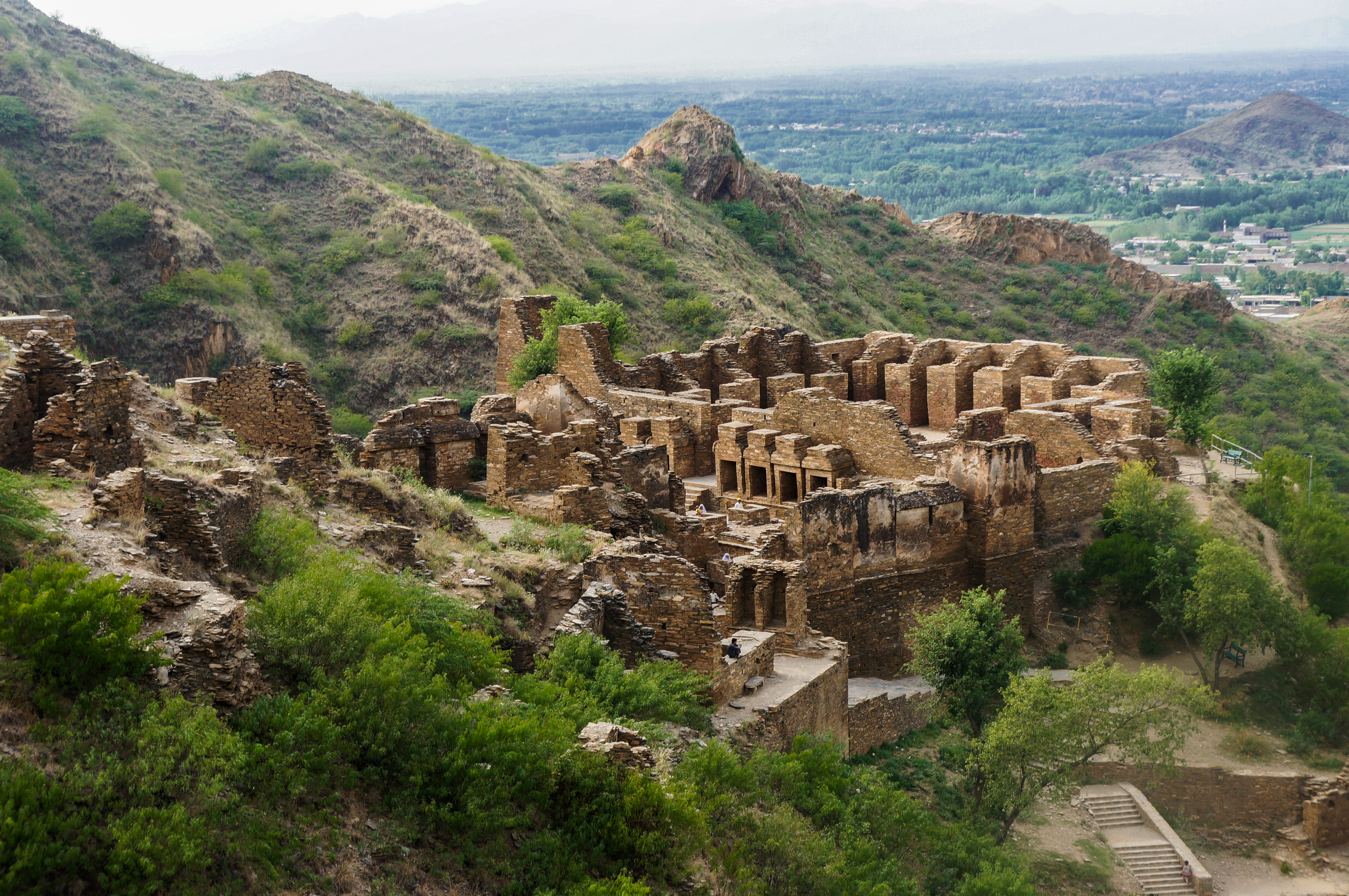
Ancient Buddhist monastery Takht-i-Bahi (a UNESCO World Heritage Site) constructed by the Indo-Parthians in Khyber Pakhtunkhwa, Pakistan

After the death of Gondophares I, the empire started to fragment. The name or title Gondophares was adapted by Sarpedones, who become Gondophares II and was possibly a son of the first Gondophares. Even though he claimed to be the main ruler, Sarpedones' rule was shaky and he issued a fragmented coinage in Sind, eastern Punjab and Arachosia in southern Afghanistan. The most important successor was Abdagases, Gondophares' nephew, who ruled in Punjab and possibly in the homeland of Seistan. After a short reign, Sarpedones seems to have been succeeded by Orthagnes, who became Gondophares III Gadana. Orthagnes ruled mostly in Seistan and Arachosia, with Abdagases further east, during the first decades CE, and was briefly succeeded by his son Ubouzanes. After 20 CE, a king named Sases, probably a nephew of the Apracaraja ruler Aspavarma, took over Abdagases' territories and became Gondophares IV Sases. According to Senior, this is the Gondophares referred to in the Takht-i-Bahi inscription and potentially the Acts of Thomas.

There were other minor kings: Sanabares was an ephemeral usurper in Seistan and called himself Great King of Kings. Coins of a second Abdagases are also known, as are of a ruler named Satavastres. However, the Indo-Parthians never regained the position of Gondophares I, and from the middle of the 1st century CE the Kushans under Kujula Kadphises began absorbing the northern Indian part of the kingdom.

=== Rulers of Turan and Sakastan (160–230 CE) ===
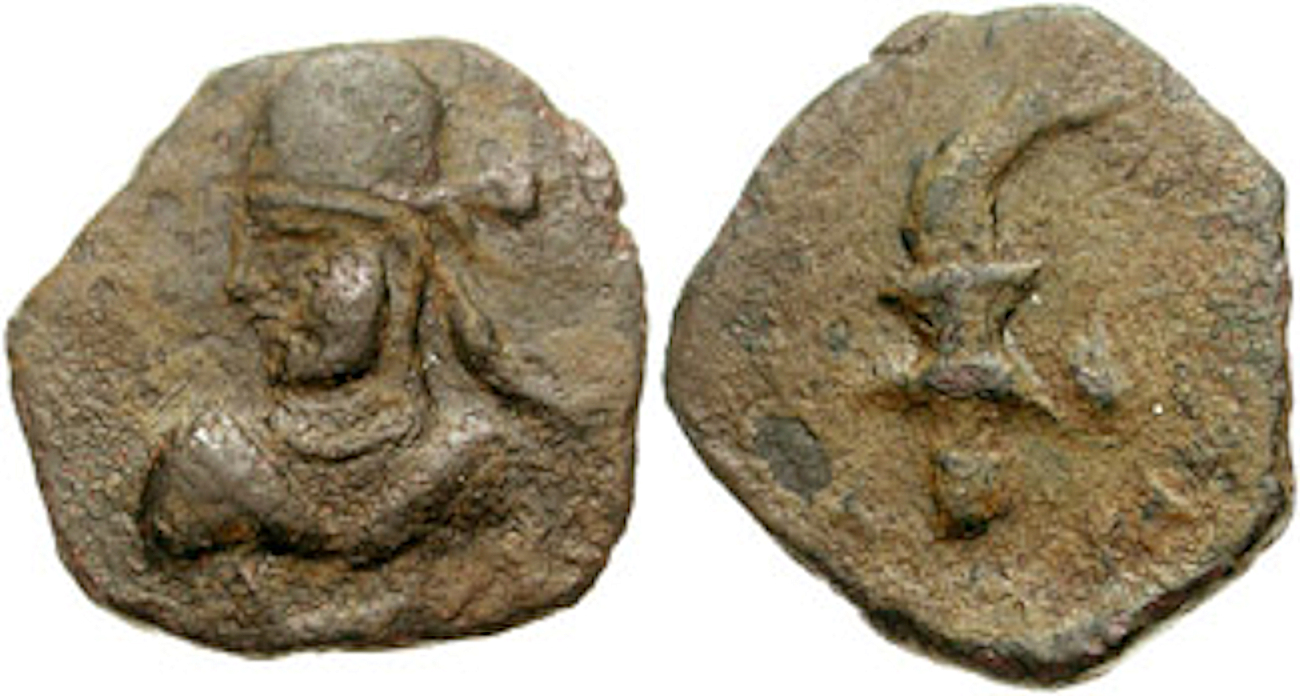
Coinage of Pahares I, Indo-Parthian king of Turan (Circa 160–230 CE). Bearded bust left, wearing Parthian-style tiara. Crude figure of Nike walking right.

The Indo-Parthians managed to retain control of Turan and Sakastan, which they ruled until the fall of the Parthian Empire at the hands of the Sasanian Empire circa 230 CE. Pahares I (160–230 CE) was a ruler of Turan following the partition of the remains of the Indo-Parthian kingdom. The kingdom of Sakastan was ruled by a second king with the name Sanabares II (160–175 CE). The Kingdoms of Turan and Sakastan ended when they submitted to the Sasanian ruler Ardeshir I circa 230 CE. These events were recorded by al-Tabari, describing the arrival of envoys to Ardeshir at Gor:

"Then he [Ardashir] marched back from the Sawad to Istakhr, from there irst to Sagistan, then to Gurgan, then to Abrasahr, Merv, Balkh, and Khwarizm to the farthest boundaries of the provinces of Kohrasan, whereupon he returned to Merv. After he had killed many people and sent their heads to the Fire temple of Anahedh he returned from Merv to Pars and settled in Gor. Then envoys of the king of the Kushan, of the kings of Turan and Mokran came to him with declarations of their submission."

— Al-Tabari

== Archaeology and sources ==
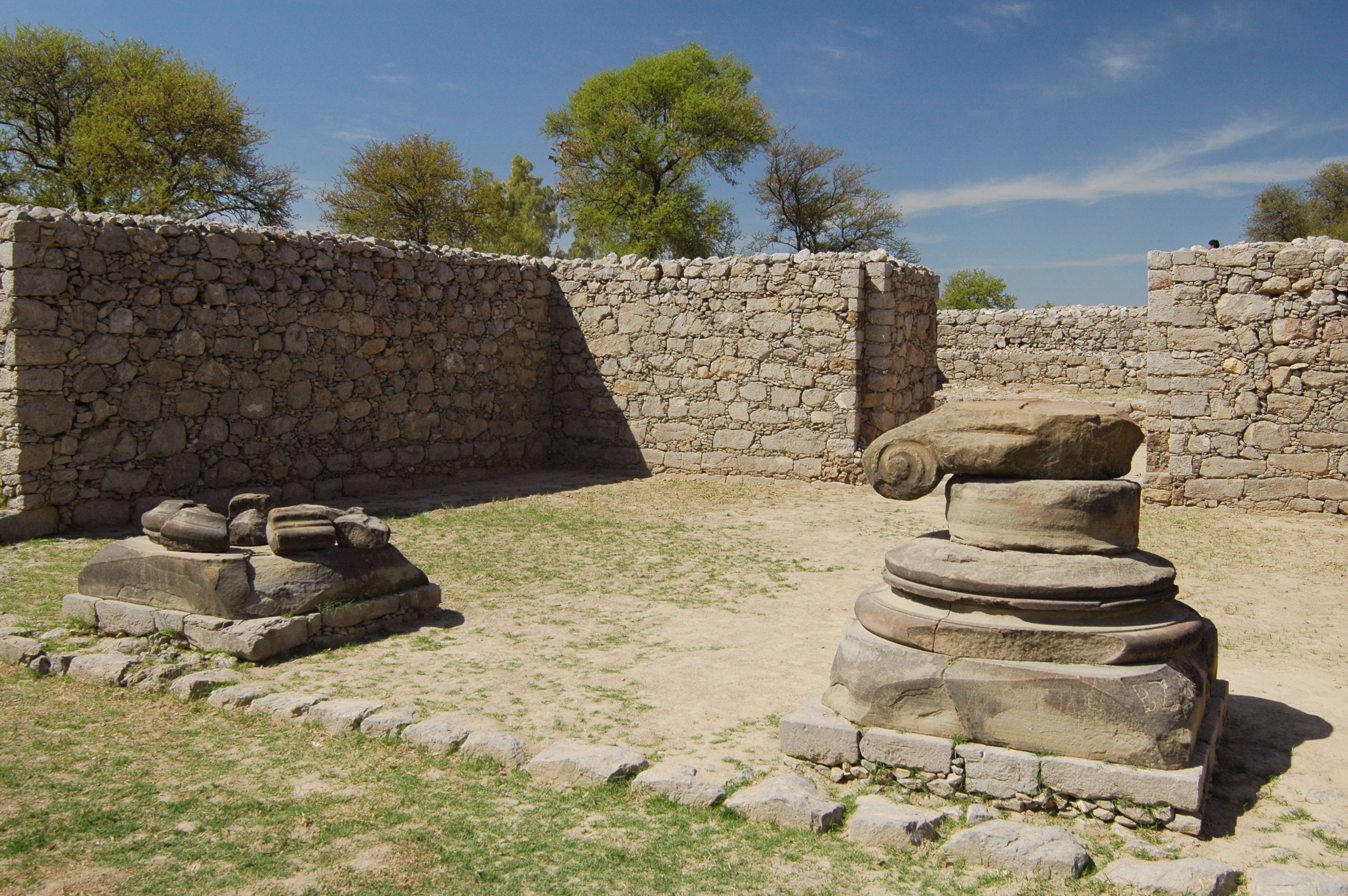
The Hellenistic temple with Ionic columns at Jandial, Taxila, Khyber Pakhtunkhwa, Pakistan. It is usually interpreted as a Zoroastrian fire temple from the period of the Indo-Parthians.

The city of Taxila is thought to have been a capital of the Indo-Parthians. Large strata were excavated by Sir John Marshall with a quantity of Parthian-style artifacts. The nearby temple of Jandial is usually interpreted as a Zoroastrian fire temple from the period of the Indo-Parthians.

Some ancient writings describe the presence of the Indo-Parthians in the area, such as the story of Saint Thomas the Apostle, who was recruited as a carpenter to serve at the court of king "Gudnaphar" (thought to be Gondophares I or Gondophares IV Sases) in India. The Acts of Thomas describes in chapter 17 Thomas' visit to king Gudnaphar in northern India; chapters 2 and 3 depict him as embarking on a sea voyage to India, thus connecting Thomas to the west coast of India.

As Senior points out, this Gudnaphar has usually been identified with the first Gondophares, who has thus been dated after the advent of Christianity, but there is no evidence for this assumption, and Senior's research shows that Gondophares I could be dated even before 1 CE. If the account is even historical, Saint Thomas may have encountered one of the later kings who bore the same title.

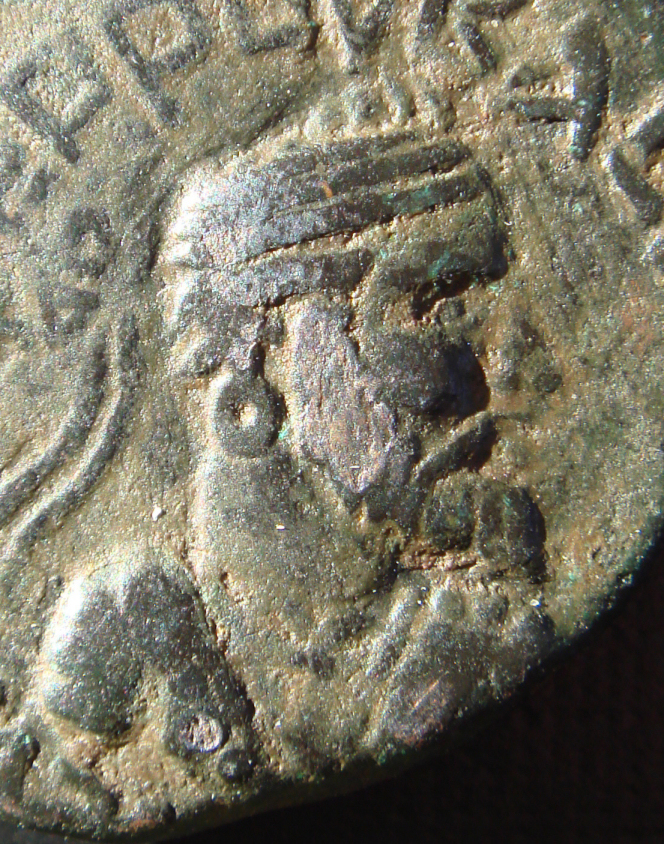
Portrait on Gondophares on one of his coins

The Greek philosopher Apollonius of Tyana is related by Philostratus in Life of Apollonius Tyana to have visited India, and specifically the city of Taxila around 46 CE. He describes constructions of the Greek type, probably referring to Sirkap, and explains that the Indo-Parthian king of Taxila, named Phraotes, received a Greek education at the court of his father and spoke Greek fluently:

"Tell me, O King, how you acquired such a command of the Greek tongue, and whence you derived all your philosophical attainments in this place?"

[...]-"My father, after a Greek education, brought me to the sages at an age somewhat too early perhaps, for I was only twelve at the time, but they brought me up like their own son; for any that they admit knowing the Greek tongue they are especially fond of, because they consider that in virtue of the similarity of his disposition he already belongs to themselves."

The Periplus of the Erythraean Sea is a surviving 1st century guide to the routes that was commonly used for navigating the Arabian Sea. It describes the presence of Parthian kings fighting with each other in the area of Sindh, a region traditionally known at that time as "Scythia" due to the previous rule of the Indo-Scythians there:

"This river (Indus) has seven mouths, very shallow and marshy, so that they are not navigable, except the one in the middle; at which by the shore, is the market-town, Barbaricum. Before it there lies a small island, and inland behind it is the metropolis of Scythia, Minnagara; it is subject to Parthian princes who are constantly driving each other out."

— Periplus of the Erythraean Sea, Chap 38

An inscription from Takht-i-Bahi bears two dates, one in the regnal year 26 of the Maharaja Guduvhara (again thought to be a Gondophares), and the year 103 of an unknown era.

== Religion ==
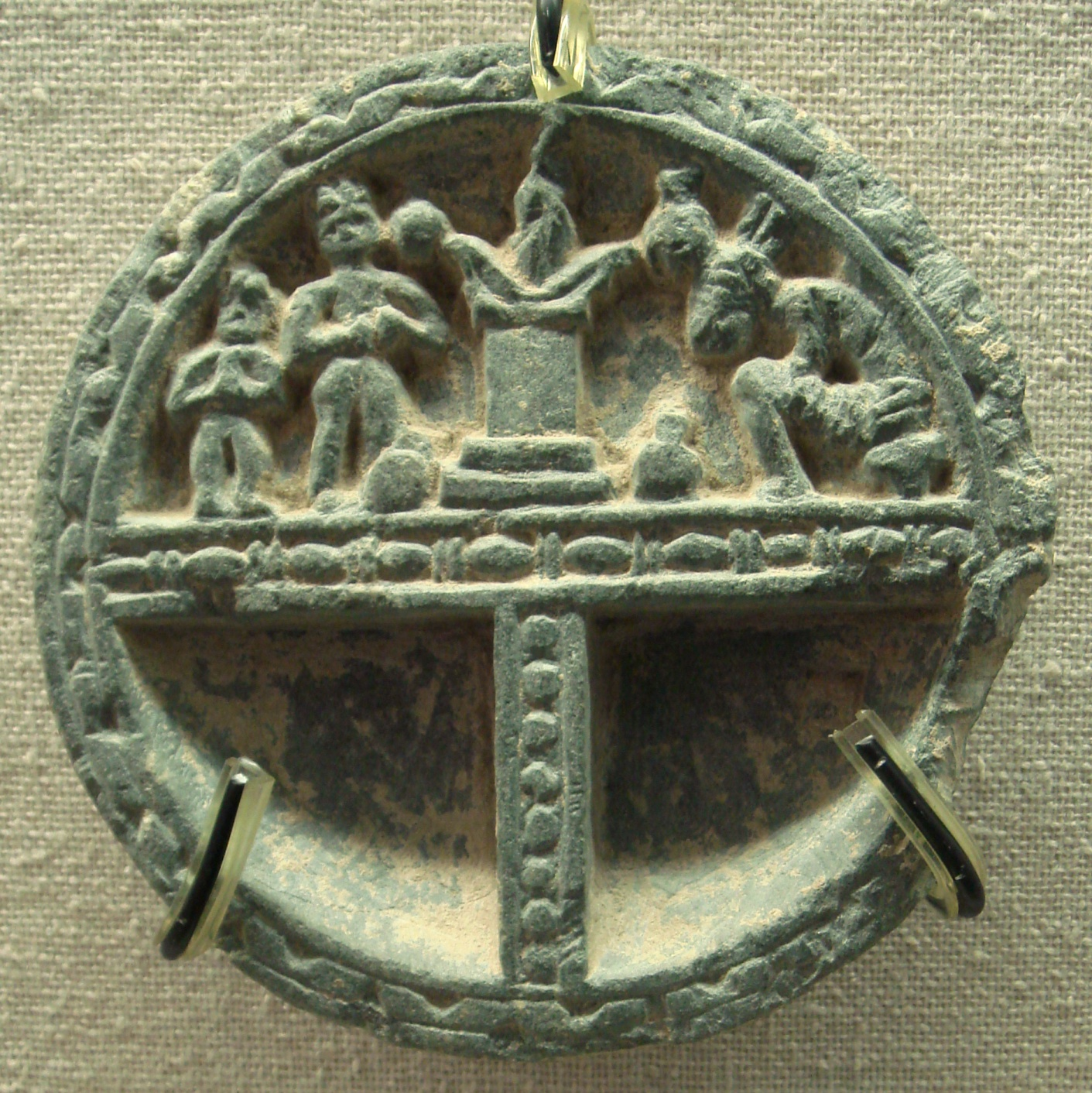
Devotees at Zoroastrian fire-altar

The religion of the House of Suren is unknown although it is known to have been in conflict with the Zoroastrian Arsacid dynasty. Unlike the Indo-Greeks or Indo-Scythians, there are no explicit records of Indo-Parthian rulers supporting Buddhism, such as religious dedications, inscriptions or even legendary accounts. Also, although Indo-Parthian coins generally closely follow Greek numismatics, they never display the Buddhist triratna symbol (apart from the later Sases), and they never use depictions of the elephant or the bull, possible religious symbols that were profusely used by their predecessors. They are thought to have retained Zoroastrianism since they were of Iranian extraction themselves. This Iranian mythological system was inherited from them by the later Kushans who ruled from Peshawar in Gandhara.

Coins of the Hindu deity Shiva have also been found issued in the reign of Gondophares I.

=== Representation of Indo-Parthian devotees ===
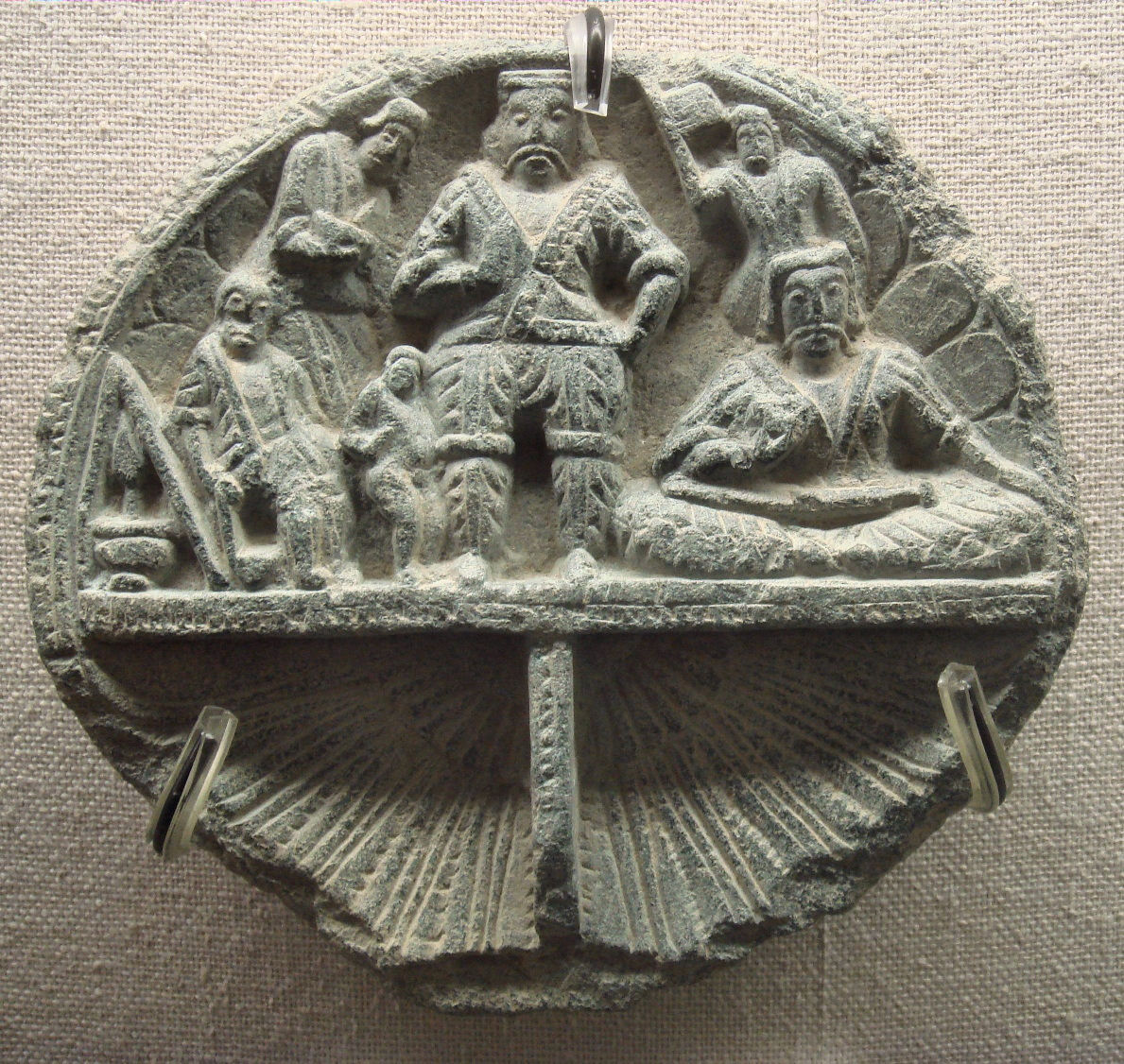
Indo-Parthian King

On their coins and in the art of Gandhara, the Indo-Parthians are depicted with short crossover jackets and large baggy trousers, possibly supplemented by chap-like over-trousers. Their jackets are adorned with rows of decorative rings or medals. Their hair is usually bushy and contained with a headband, a practise largely adopted by the Parthians from the 1st century CE.

Individuals in Indo-Parthian attire are sometimes shown as actors in Buddhist devotional scenes. It is usually considered that most of the excavations that were done at Sirkap, near Taxila, by John Marshall relate to Indo-Parthian layers, but more recent scholarship sometimes relates them instead to the Indo-Greeks. That archaeological research has provided a quantity of Hellenistic artifacts combined with elements of Buddhist worship (stupas). Some other temples, such as in nearby Jandial, may have been used as a Zoroastrian fire temple.

=== Buddhist sculptures ===
The statues found at Sirkap in the late Scythian to Parthian level (level 2, 1–60 CE) suggest a developed state of Gandharan art at the time or even before Parthian rule. A multiplicity of statues, ranging from Hellenistic gods, to various Gandharan lay devotees, are combined with what are thought as some of the early representations of the Buddha and Bodhisattvas. Today, it is still unclear when the Greco-Buddhist art of Gandhara exactly emerged, but the findings in Sirkap do indicate that the art had been highly developed before the advent of the Kushans.

=== Stone palettes ===
Numerous stone palettes found in Gandhara are considered to be good representatives of Indo-Parthian art. These palettes combine Greek and Persian influences, together with a frontality in representations which is considered as characteristic of Parthian art. Such palettes have been found only in archaeological layers corresponding to Indo-Greek, Indo-Scythian and Indo-Parthian rule, and are essentially unknown the preceding Mauryan layers or the succeeding Kushan layers.

The palettes very often represent people in Greek dress in mythological scenes, but a few of them represent people in Parthian dress (head-bands over bushy hair, crossed-over jacket on a bare chest, jewelry, belt, baggy trousers). A palette from the Naprstek Museum in Prague shows an Indo-Parthian king, seated crossed-legged on a large sofa, surrounded by two attendants also in Parthian dress. They are shown to be drinking and serving wine.

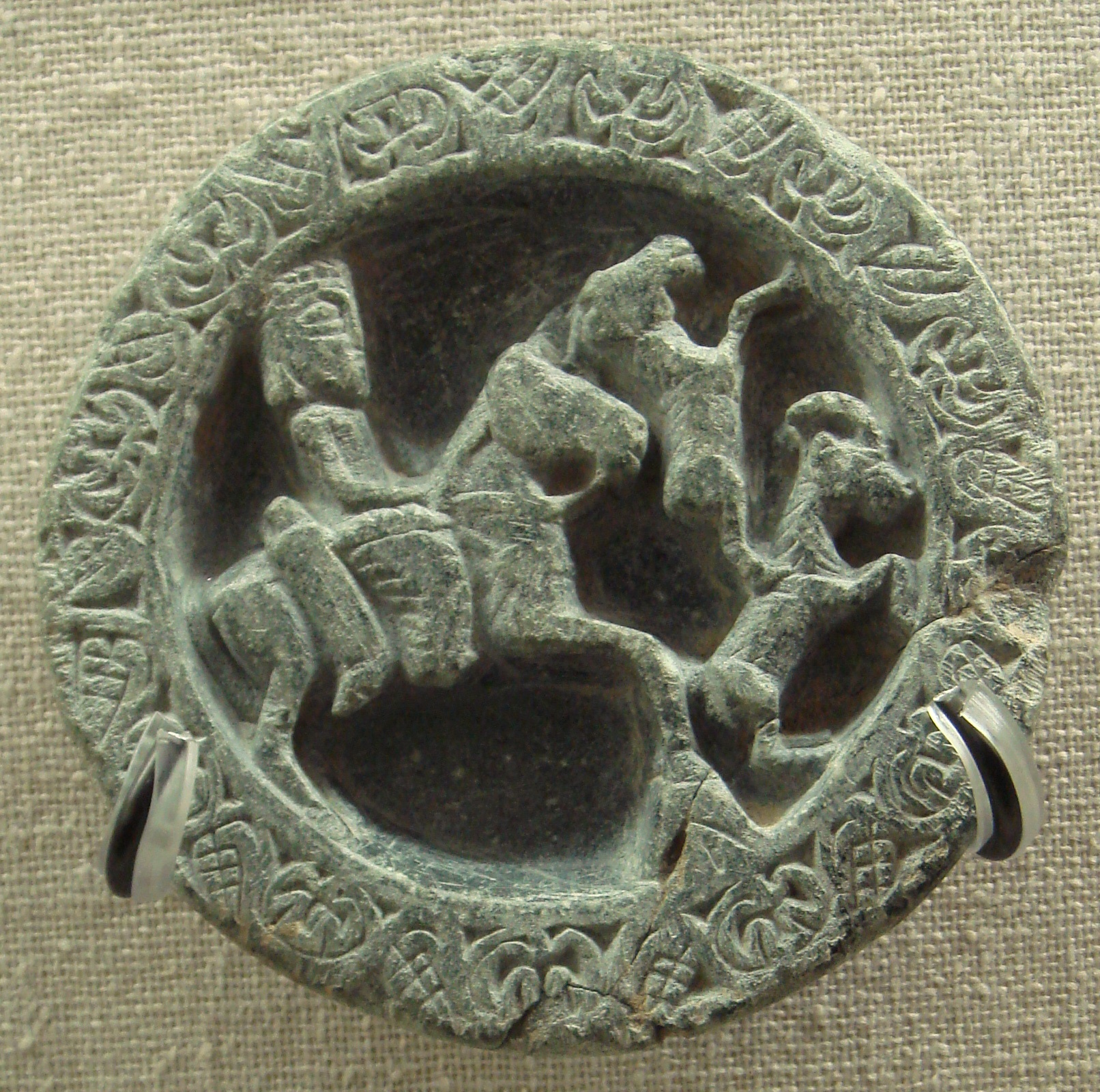
Indo-Parthian man hunting

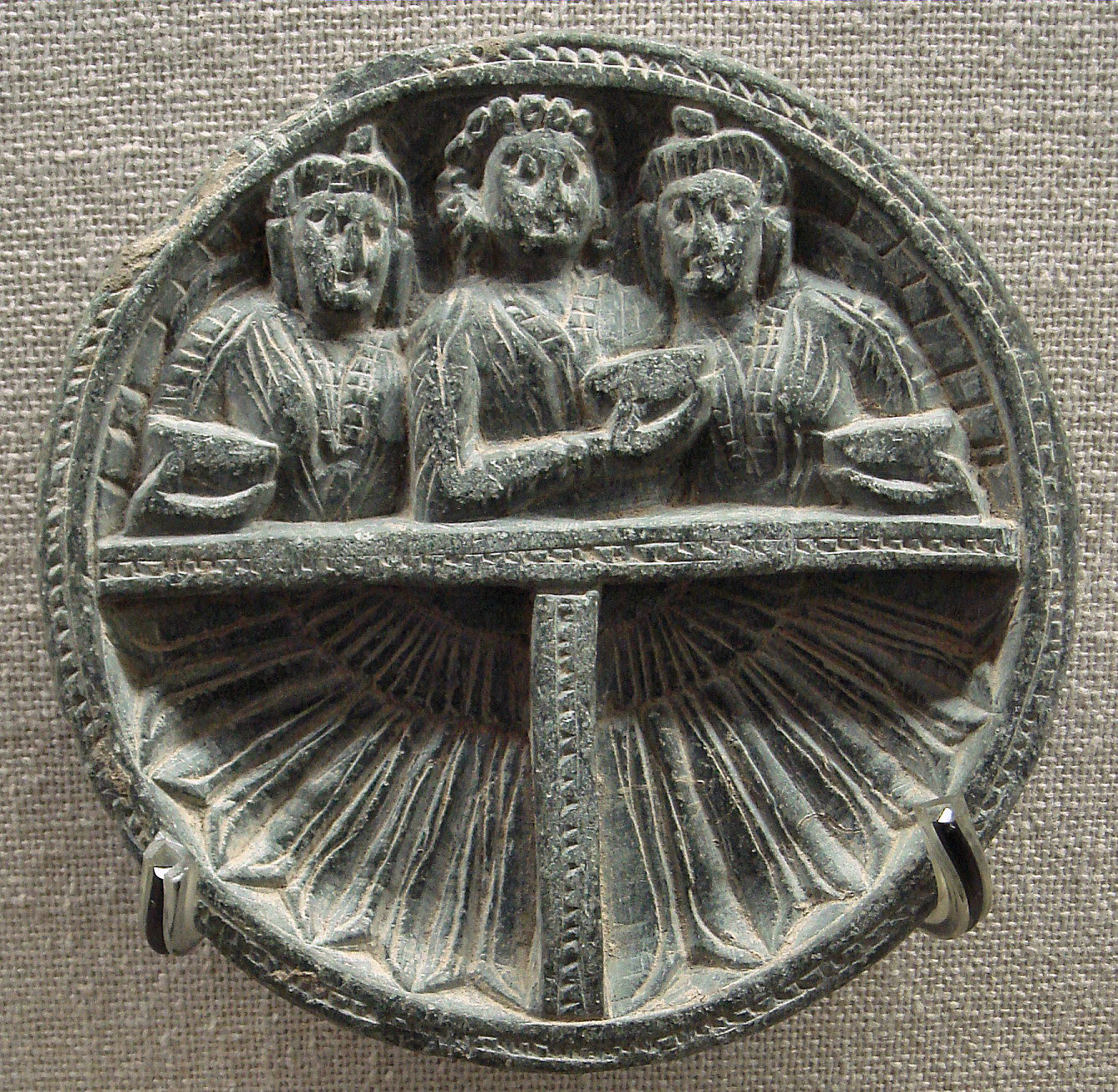
Indo-Parthian revelers

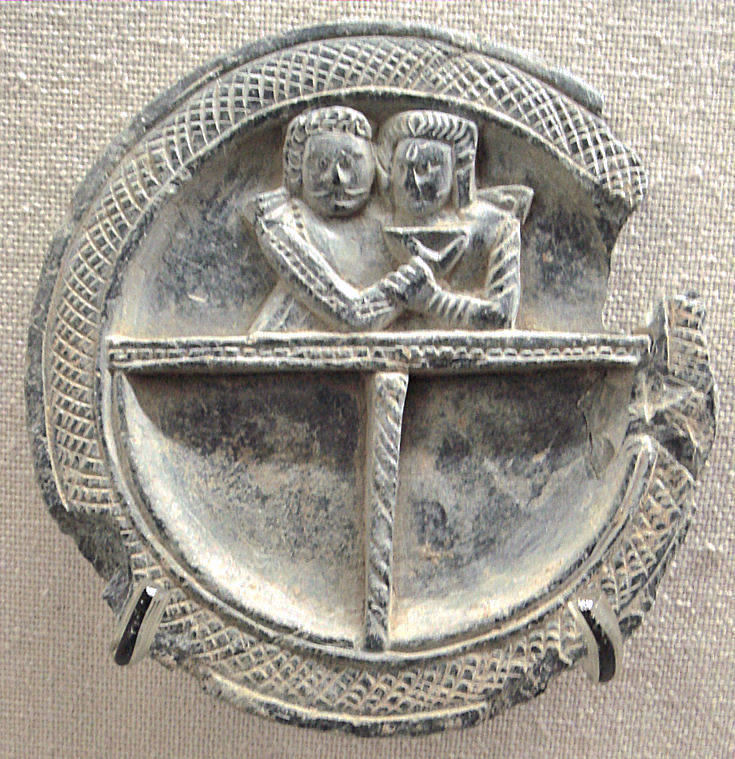
Indo-Parthian couple

=== Silk Road transmission of Buddhism ===
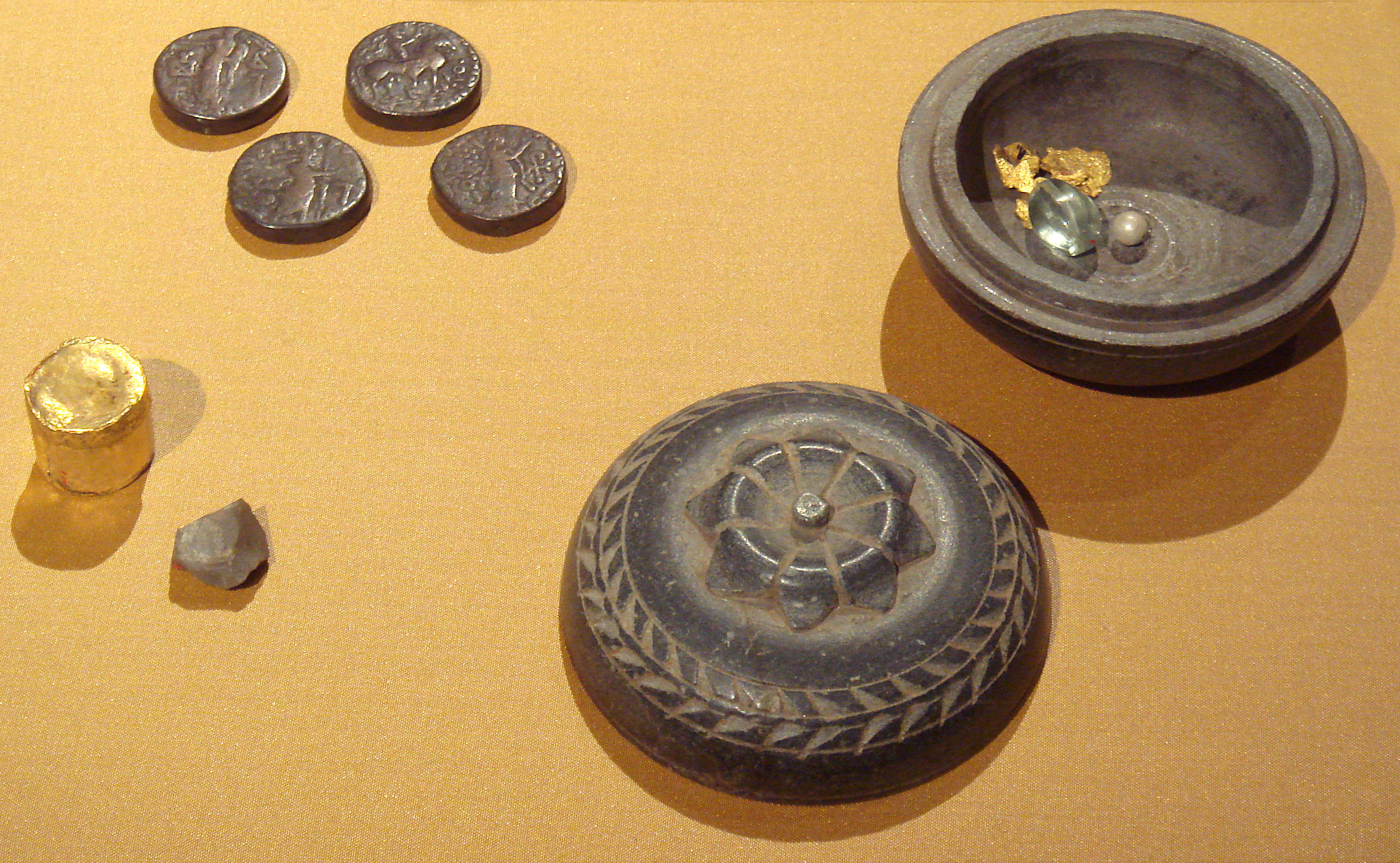
Gandhara Buddhist reliquary with contents, including Indo-Parthian coins, 1st century CE

Some pockets of Parthian rule remained in the East, even after the takeover by the Sassanids in 226. From the 2nd century, several Central-Asian Buddhist missionaries appeared in the Chinese capital cities of Luoyang and sometimes Nanjing, where they particularly distinguished themselves by their translation work. The first known translators of Buddhist texts into Chinese are actually Parthian missionaries, distinguished in Chinese by their Parthian surname "An", for "Anshi", "country of the Arsacids".

- An Shih Kao, a Parthian prince who made the first known translations of Hinayana Buddhist texts into Chinese (148–170).
- An Hsuan, a Parthian merchant who became a monk in China 181 CE.
- Tan-ti (c. 254), a Parthian monk.
- An Fajin (281–306), a monk of Parthian origins.

== Main rulers ==
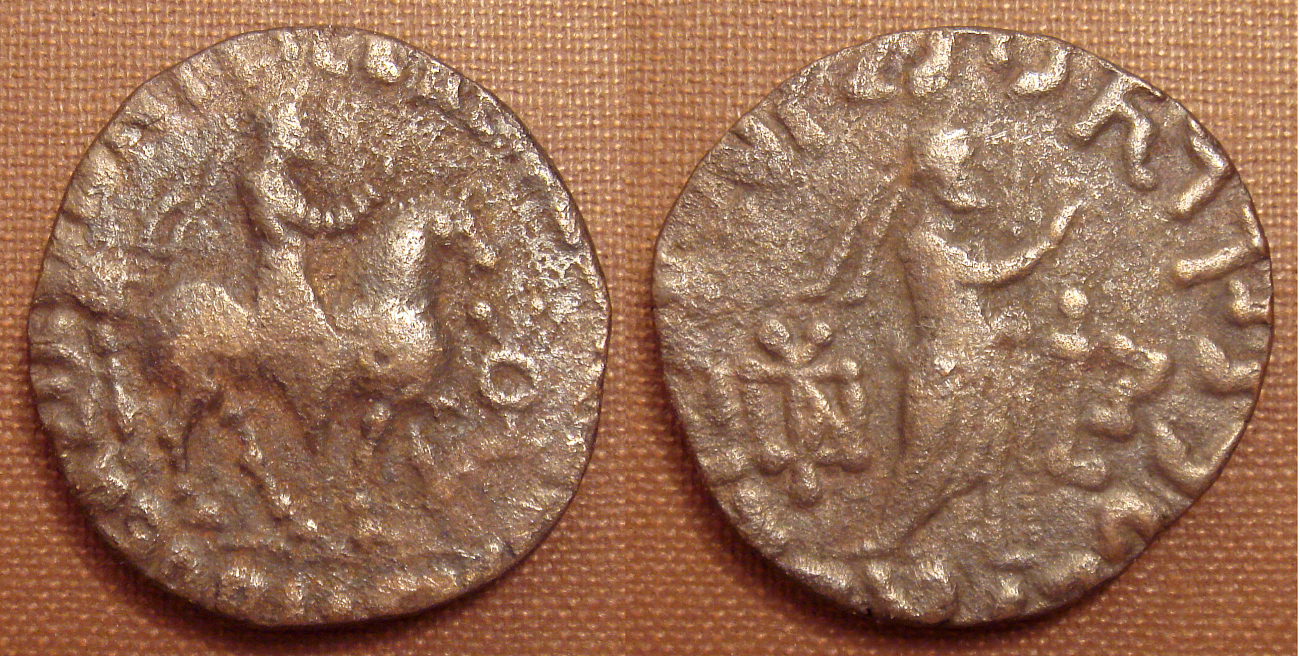
Coins of the Indo-Parthian king Abdagases, in which his clothing is clearly apparent. He wears baggy trousers, rather typical of Parthian clothing.

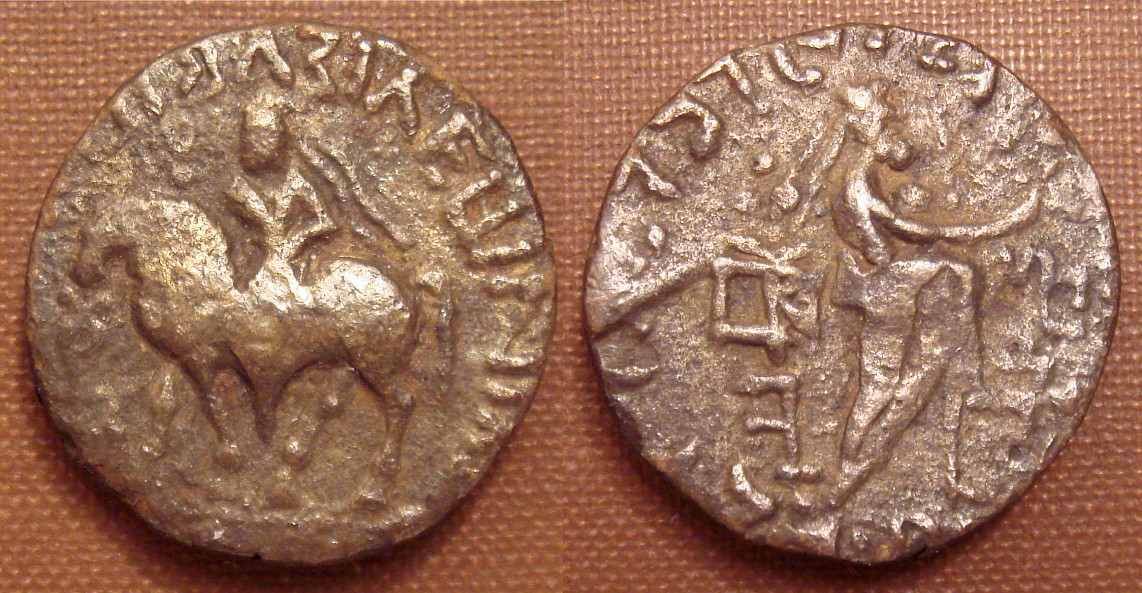
Coins of the Indo-Parthian king Abdagases, in which his clothing is clearly apparent. He wears baggy trousers and a crossover jacket.

- Gondophares I (c. 19 – 46)
- Gondophares II Sarpedones (first years CE – c. 20 CE)
- Abdagases I (first years CE – mid-1st century CE)
- Gondophares III Gudana, previously Orthagnes (c. 20 CE – 30 CE)
- Gondophares IV Sases, (mid-1st century CE)
- Ubouzanes (late-1st century CE)
- Pacores (late 1st century CE)
- Farn-Sasan (r. 210 – 226)

== See also ==
- Indo-Sasanians
- Yuezhi
- Pahlavas

== Sources ==
- Bosworth, Clifford Edmund (1997). "Sīstān". The Encyclopedia of Islam, New Edition, Volume IX: San–Sze. Leiden, and New York: BRILL. pp. 681–685. ISBN 9789004082656.
- Schmitt, R. (1995). "DRANGIANA". Encyclopaedia Iranica, Vol. II, Fasc. 5. pp. 534–537.
- Ellerbrock, Uwe (2021). The Parthians: The Forgotten Empire. Routledge.
- Frye, Richard Nelson (1984). The History of Ancient Iran. C.H.Beck. pp. 1–411. ISBN 9783406093975. "The history of ancient iran."
- Gazerani, Saghi (2015). The Sistani Cycle of Epics and Iran's National History: On the Margins of Historiography. BRILL. pp. 1–250. ISBN 9789004282964.
- Bivar, A. D. H. (2002). "GONDOPHARES". Encyclopaedia Iranica, Vol. XI, Fasc. 2. pp. 135–136.
- Olbrycht, Marek Jan (2016). "Dynastic Connections in the Arsacid Empire and the Origins of the House of Sāsān". In Curtis, Vesta Sarkhosh; Pendleton, Elizabeth J.; Alram, Michael; Daryaee, Touraj (eds.). The Parthian and Early Sasanian Empires: Adaptation and Expansion. Oxbow Books. ISBN 9781785702082.
- Rezakhani, Khodadad (2017). ReOrienting the Sasanians: East Iran in Late Antiquity. Edinburgh University Press. pp. 1–256. ISBN 9781474400305.

Timeline and cultural period	Indus plain (Punjab-Sapta Sindhu-Gujarat)	Gangetic Plain			Central India	Southern India
Timeline and cultural period	Indus plain (Punjab-Sapta Sindhu-Gujarat)	Upper Gangetic Plain (Ganga-Yamuna doab)	Middle Gangetic Plain	Lower Gangetic Plain	Central India	Southern India
IRON AGE
Culture	Late Vedic Period	Late Vedic Period; Painted Grey Ware culture	Late Vedic Period; Northern Black Polished Ware		Pre-history	
6th century BCE	Gandhara	Kuru-Panchala	Magadha		Adivasi (tribes)	Assaka
Culture	Persian-Greek influences	"Second Urbanisation"; Rise of Shramana movements Jainism - Buddhism - Ājīvika - Yoga			Pre-history	
5th century BCE	(Persian conquests)		Shaishunaga dynasty		Adivasi (tribes)	Assaka
4th century BCE	(Greek conquests)	Nanda empire				
HISTORICAL AGE
Culture	Spread of Buddhism				Pre-history	
3rd century BCE	Maurya Empire					Satavahana dynasty Sangam period (300 BCE – 200 CE); Early Cholas; Early Pandyan kingdom Cheras
Culture	Preclassical Hinduism (Note: Michaels (2004) p.39) - "Hindu Synthesis" (Note: Hiltebeitel (2002)) (ca. 200 BCE - 300 CE) (Note: Michaels (2004) p.39) (Note: Hiltebeitel (2002)); Epics - Puranas - Ramayana - Mahabharata - Bhagavad Gita - Brahma Sutras - Smarta Tradition; Mahayana Buddhism					
2nd century BCE	Indo-Greek Kingdom		Shunga Empire; Maha-Meghavahana Dynasty			Satavahana dynasty Sangam period (300 BCE – 200 CE); Early Cholas; Early Pandyan kingdom Cheras
1st century BCE	Indo-Greek Kingdom		Shunga Empire; Maha-Meghavahana Dynasty			Satavahana dynasty Sangam period (300 BCE – 200 CE); Early Cholas; Early Pandyan kingdom Cheras
1st century CE	Indo-Scythians; Indo-Parthians		Kuninda Kingdom			Satavahana dynasty Sangam period (300 BCE – 200 CE); Early Cholas; Early Pandyan kingdom Cheras
2nd century	Kushan Empire					Satavahana dynasty Sangam period (300 BCE – 200 CE); Early Cholas; Early Pandyan kingdom Cheras
3rd century	Kushano-Sasanian Kingdom; Western Satraps	Kushan Empire		Kamarupa kingdom	Adivasi (tribes)	Satavahana dynasty Sangam period (300 BCE – 200 CE); Early Cholas; Early Pandyan kingdom Cheras
Culture	"Golden Age of Hinduism"(ca. CE 320-650) (Note: Michaels (2004) p.40); Puranas - Kural; Co-existence of Hinduism and Buddhism					
4th century	Kidarites	Gupta Empire; Varman dynasty				Andhra Ikshvakus; Kalabhra dynasty Kadamba Dynasty; Western Ganga Dynasty
5th century	Hephthalite Empire	Alchon Huns				Vishnukundina; Kalabhra dynasty
6th century	Nezak Huns; Kabul Shahi; Maitraka				Adivasi (tribes)	Vishnukundina; Badami Chalukyas; Kalabhra dynasty
Culture	Late-Classical Hinduism (ca. CE 650-1100) (Note: Michaels (2004) p.41); Advaita Vedanta - Tantra; Decline of Buddhism in India					
7th century	Indo-Sassanids		Vakataka dynasty Empire of Harsha	Mlechchha dynasty	Adivasi (tribes)	Badami Chalukyas; Eastern Chalukyas; Pandyan kingdom (revival); Pallava
7th century	Karkota dynasty				Adivasi (tribes)	
8th century	Kabul Shahi	Pala Empire			Adivasi (tribes)	Eastern Chalukyas; Pandyan kingdom Kalachuri
9th century	Gurjara-Pratihara				Adivasi (tribes)	Rashtrakuta Empire; Eastern Chalukyas; Pandyan kingdom Medieval Cholas; Chera Perumals of Makkotai
10th century	Ghaznavids			Pala dynasty Kamboja-Pala dynasty	Adivasi (tribes)	Kalyani Chalukyas; Eastern Chalukyas; Medieval Cholas; Chera Perumals of Makkotai; Rashtrakuta
References and sources for table References Sources: Flood, Gavin D. (1996), An Introduction to Hinduism, Cambridge University Press; Hiltebeitel, Alf (2002), Hinduism. In: Joseph Kitagawa, "The Religious Traditions of Asia: Religion, History, and Culture", Routledge; Michaels, Axel (2004), Hinduism. Past and present, Princeton, New Jersey: Princeton University Press
