= Gondophares =

King of the Indo-Parthians from 19 to 46 CE

- King of Kings; Autokrator of India
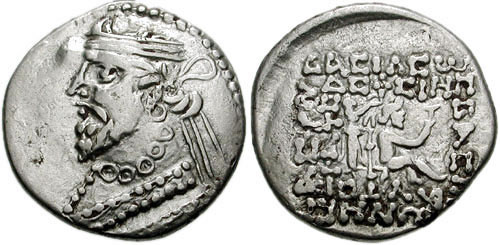
- Silver coin of Gondophares, minted in Drangiana

Indo-Parthian king
- Reign: c. 19 – c. 46
- Predecessor: Tanlis Mardates
- Successor: Orthagnes (Drangiana and Arachosia); Abdagases I (Gandhara)
- Died: 46
- Religion: Zoroastrianism (Note: As Zoroastrians-influenced rulers, Gondophares is noted for his patronage of Buddhist establishments and the construction of the Takht-i-Bahi monastery, which is a significant site in Buddhist history. Additionally, he is mentioned in early Christian apocryphal literature, indicating his connections to early Christianity. Thus, Gondophares I's kingdom reflects a blend of influences, including Zoroastrianism, Buddhism, and early Christianity.)

Gondophares I or Guduvhara I (Greek: Γονδοφαρης Gondopharēs, Υνδοφερρης Hyndopherrēs; Kharosthi: 𐨒𐨂𐨡𐨥𐨪 Gu-da-pha-ra, Gudaphara; 𐨒𐨂𐨡𐨥𐨪𐨿𐨣 Gu-da-pha-rna, Gudapharna; 𐨒𐨂𐨡𐨂𐨵𐨪 Gu-du-vha-ra, Guduvhara) was the founder of the Indo-Parthian Kingdom and its most prominent king, with his reign generally dated from c. 19 to 46 CE. He is solely known from the silver and copper coins bearing his visage, and is generally identified with the king mentioned in the Acts of Thomas and the Takht-i-Bahi inscription, although it has been suggested that these mentions may have instead been about one of his successors bearing the same name.

Gondophares I probably belonged to a line of local princes who had governed the Parthian province of Drangiana since its disruption by the Indo-Scythians in c. 129 BCE, and may have been a member of the House of Suren. During his reign, his kingdom became independent from Parthian authority and was transformed into an empire, which encompassed Drangiana, Arachosia, and Gandhara. He was succeeded in Drangiana and Arachosia by Orthagnes, and in Gandhara by his nephew Abdagases I.

== Name ==
The name of Gondophares was not a personal name, but an epithet derived from the Middle Iranian name 𐭅𐭉𐭍𐭃𐭐𐭓𐭍, Windafarn (Parthian), and 𐭢𐭥𐭭𐭣𐭯𐭥, Gundapar (Middle Persian), in turn derived from the Old Iranian name 𐎻𐎡𐎭𐎳𐎼𐎴𐎠 (Vi^{n}dafarnâ, "May he find glory" (cf. Greek Ἰνταφέρνης, Intaphérnēs)), which was also the name of one of the six nobles that helped the Achaemenid king of kings (shahanshah) Darius the Great (r. 522 BCE – 486 BCE) to seize the throne. "Gundaparnah" was apparently the Eastern Iranian form of the name. In Old Armenian, it is "Gastaphar".

== Background ==
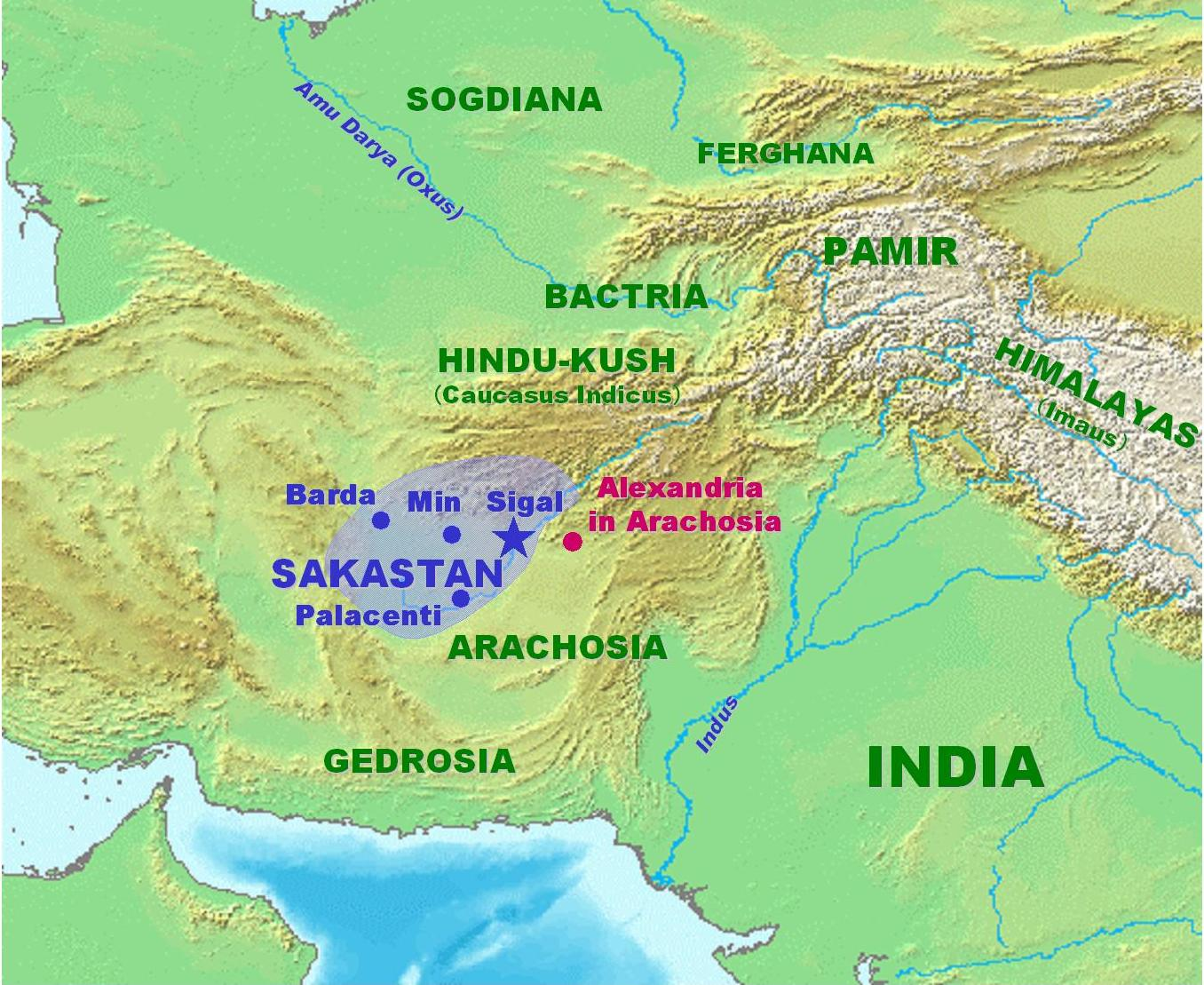
Map of Drangiana (Sakastan) in c. 100 BCE

Ernst Herzfeld maintained that the dynasty of Gondophares represented the House of Suren, one of the most esteemed families in Arsacid Iran, that not only had the hereditary right to lead the royal military, but also to place the crown on the Parthian king at the coronation. In c. 129 BCE, the eastern portions of the Parthian Empire, primarily Drangiana, was invaded by nomadic peoples, mainly by the Eastern Iranian Saka (Indo-Scythians) and the (likely also Indo-European, but of disputed affiliation) Yuezhi, thus giving the rise to the name of the province of Sakastan ("land of the Saka").

The ruler of the Parthian Empire, Mithridates II (124–88 BCE) vanquished the Sakas of the region of Sakastan, and established satraps in the region, one of them probably being Tanlis Mardates. These Parthian satraps ruled over Sakastan until the establishment of the dynasty of Gondophares (19–46 CE).

As a result of these invasions, the Suren family was may have been given control of Sakastan in order to defend the empire from further nomad incursions; the Surenids not only may have managed to repel the Indo-Scythians, but also to invade and seize their lands in Arachosia and Punjab, thus resulting in the establishment of the Indo-Parthian Kingdom.

== Reign ==
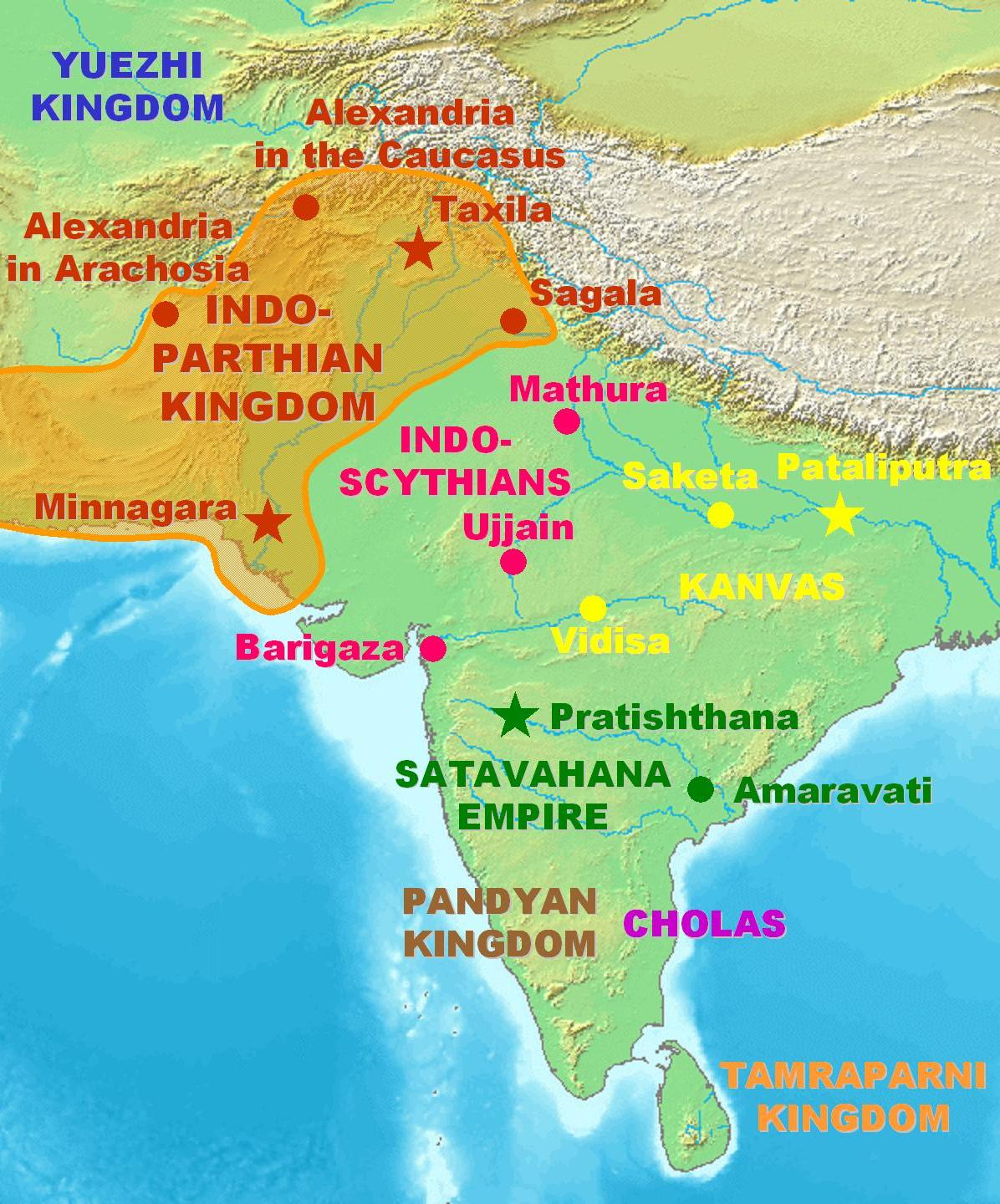
Map of the Indo-Parthian Empire under Gondophares

Gondophares ascended the throne in c. 19 or c. 20 CE, and quickly declared independence from the Parthian Empire, minting coins in Drangiana where he assumed the Greek title of autokrator ("one who rules by himself"). Gondophares I has traditionally been given a later date; the reign of one king calling himself Gondophares has been established at 20 CE by the rock inscription he set up at Takht-i-Bahi near Mardan, Pakistan, in 46 CE.

Gondophares I took over the Kabul Valley, the Punjab and Sindh region from the Scythian king Azes. In reality, a number of vassal rulers seem to have switched allegiance from the Indo-Scythians to Gondophares I. His empire was vast, but was only a loose framework, which fragmented soon after his death. His capital was the Gandharan city of Taxila, located in Punjab to the west of the present Islamabad. On the coins of Gondophares, the royal name is Iranian, but the other legends of the coins are in Greek and Kharoṣṭhī.

Ernst Herzfeld claims his name is perpetuated in the name of the Afghan city Kandahar, which he founded under the name Gundopharron.

== Possible literary references ==
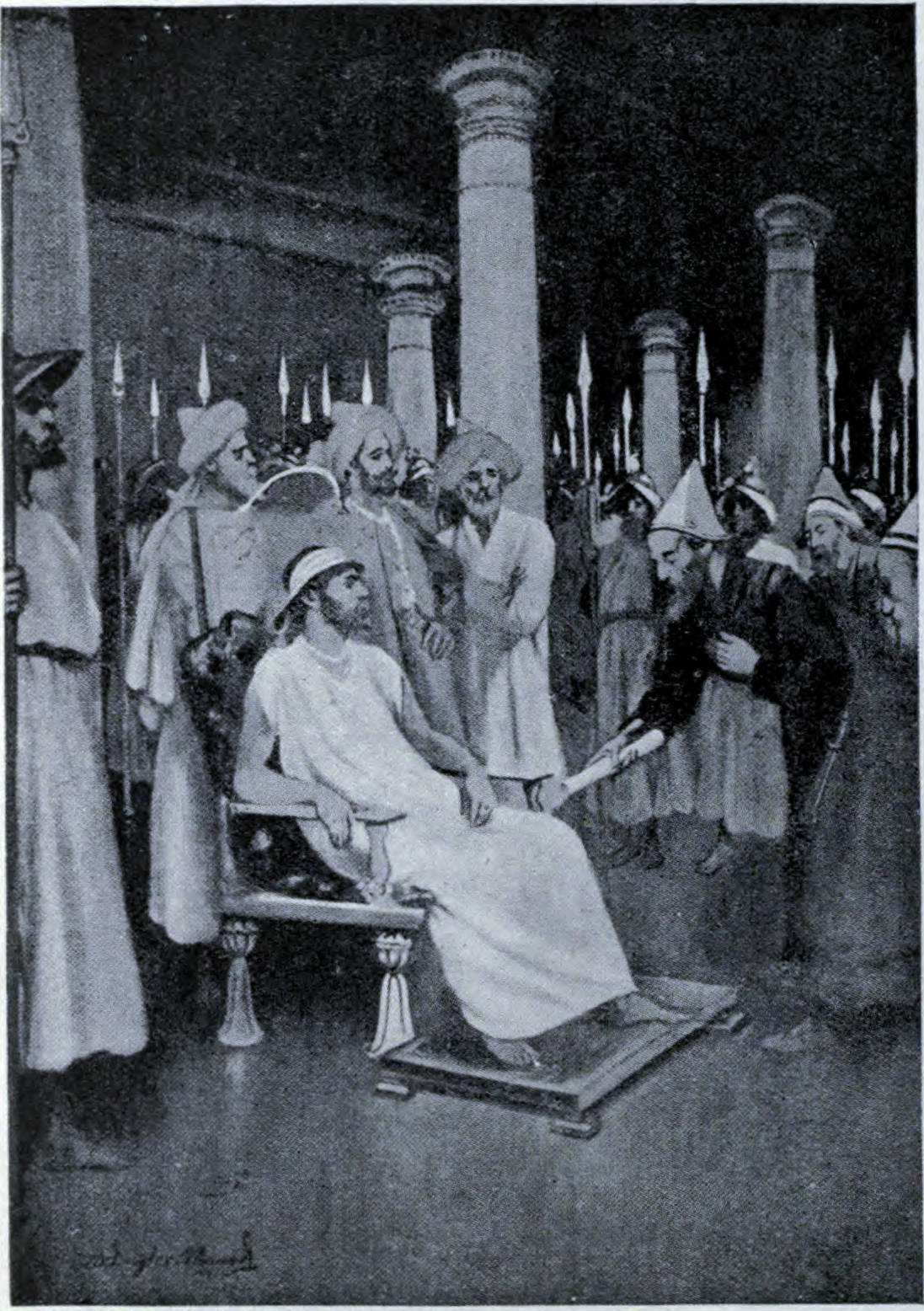
Gondophares receives a letter from St. Thomas.

The apocryphical Acts of Thomas mentions one king Gudnaphar. This king has been associated with Gondophares I by scholars such as M. Reinaud, as it was not yet established that there were several kings with the same name. Since St. Thomas is said to have lived there in a specific time frame, this is often used to provide more specific chronology to an otherwise historiographically lacking time frame. Richard N. Frye, Emeritus Professor of Iranian Studies at Harvard University, has noted that this ruler has been identified with a king called Caspar in the Christian tradition of the Apostle St Thomas and his visit to India. Recent numismatic research by R.C. Senior supports the notion that the king who best fits these references was Gondophares-Sases, the fourth king using the title Gondophares.

A. D. H. Bivar, writing in The Cambridge History of Iran, said that the reign dates of one Gondophares recorded in the Takht-i Bahi inscription (20–46 or later CE) are consistent with the dates given in the Apocryphal Acts of Thomas for the Apostle's voyage to India following the Crucifixion in c. 30 CE. B. N. Puri, of the Department of Ancient Indian History and Archaeology, University of Lucknow, India, also identified Gondophares with the ruler said to have been converted by Saint Thomas the Apostle. The same goes for the reference to an Indo-Parthian king in the accounts of the life of Apollonius of Tyana. Puri says that the dates given by Philostratus in his Life of Apollonius of Tyana for Apollonius' visit to Taxila, 43–44 CE, are within the period of the reign of Gondophares I, who also went by the Parthian name, Phraotes. Saint Thomas was brought before King Gundaphar (Gondophares) at his capital, Taxila. "Taxila" is the Greek form of the contemporary Pali name for the city, "Takkasila", from the Sanskrit "Taksha-sila". The name of the city was transformed in subsequent legends concerning Thomas, which were consolidated into the Historia Trium Regum (History of the Three Kings) by John of Hildesheim (1364–1375), into "Silla", "Egrisilla", "Grisculla", and so on, the name having undergone a process of metamorphosis similar to that which transformed "Vindapharnah" (Gondophares) to "Caspar". Hildesheim's Historia Trium Regum says: "In the third India is the kingdom of Tharsis, which at that time was ruled over by King Caspar, who offered incense to our Lord. The famous island Eyrisoulla [or Egrocilla] lies in this land: it is there that the holy apostle St Thomas is buried". "Egrisilla" appears on the globe made in Nuremberg by Martin Behaim in 1492, where it appears on the southernmost part of the peninsula of Hoch India, "High India" or "India Superior", on the eastern side of the Sinus Magnus ("Great Gulf", the Gulf of Thailand): there Egrisilla is identified with the inscription, das lant wird genant egtisilla, ("the land called Egrisilla"). In his study of Behaim's globe, E. G. Ravenstein noted: "Egtisilla, or Eyrisculla [or Egrisilla: the letters "r" and "t" in the script on the globe look similar], is referred to in John of Hildesheim's version of the 'Three Kings' as an island where St. Thomas lies buried".

== Legacy of the name ==
The name of Gondophares was translated in Armenian in "Gastaphar", and then in Western languages into "Gasbar[d], Gaspas, Caspus, Kaspar, גִזבָּר ". He may be the "Gasbar[d], Treasurer and King of Persia", who, according to apocryphal texts and eastern Christian tradition, was one of the three Biblical Magi who attended the birth of Christ. Through this interaction and association, Gaspar[d] was adopted by the Europeans (and in Western tradition) as a male first name.

According to a historical perspective regarding the Persian literature, Gondophares is identical with Fariborz of Iranian national narratives. The name of "Fariborz" (فریبرز) was written by Abu Ali Bal'ami and al-Tabari as "Borzāfrah" (بُرزافره) and Ibn Balkhi as "Zarāfah" (زَرافَه). The author of Mojmal al-Tawarikh wrote the name as "Borzfari" (بُرزفَری) and stated that Ferdowsi changed it to "Fariborz" to keep the rhythmic structure of meter.

== See also ==
- Indo-Greek Kingdom
- Indo-Scythians
- Kushan Empire

== Sources ==
- Bosworth, Clifford Edmund (1997). "Sīstān". In Bosworth, C. E.; van Donzel, E.; Heinrichs, W. P. & Lecomte, G. (eds.). The Encyclopaedia of Islam, Second Edition. Volume IX: San–Sze. Leiden: E. J. Brill. pp. 681–685. ISBN 978-90-04-10422-8.
- Schmitt, R. (1995). "DRANGIANA". Encyclopaedia Iranica, Vol. II, Fasc. 5. pp. 534–537.
- Frye, Richard Nelson (1984). The History of Ancient Iran. C.H.Beck. pp. 1–411. ISBN 9783406093975. "The history of ancient iran."
- Gazerani, Saghi (2015). The Sistani Cycle of Epics and Iran's National History: On the Margins of Historiography. BRILL. pp. 1–250. ISBN 9789004282964.
- Bivar, A. D. H. (2002). "GONDOPHARES". Encyclopaedia Iranica, Vol. XI, Fasc. 2. pp. 135–136.
- Rezakhani, Khodadad (2017). ReOrienting the Sasanians: East Iran in Late Antiquity. Edinburgh University Press. pp. 1–256. ISBN 9781474400305.
