= List of cities founded by Alexander the Great =

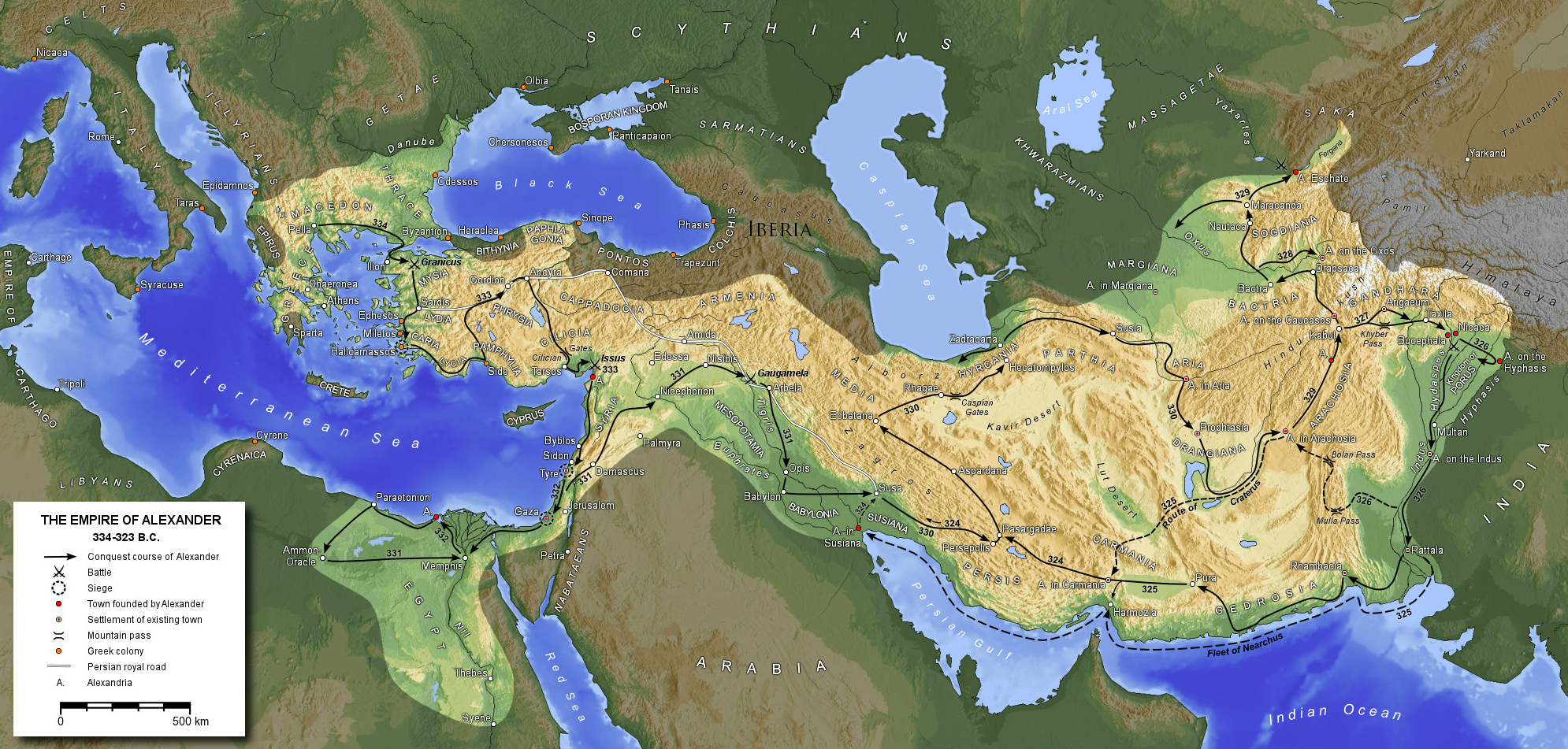
Alexander the Great founded many settlements during his military campaigns.

Alexander the Great (356 – 323 BC), a king of ancient Macedon, created one of the largest empires in history by waging an extensive military campaign throughout Asia. Alexander was groomed for rulership from an early age and acceded to the throne after the assassination of his father, Philip II. After subduing rebellious vassals, he invaded the Persian Achaemenid Empire in 334 BC. Alexander swiftly conquered large areas of Western Asia and Egypt, defeating the Persian king Darius III in battle at Issus and Gaugamela. Achieving complete domination over the former lands of the Achaemenids by 327 BC, Alexander attempted to conquer India but turned back after his weary troops mutinied. Following his death aged thirty-two in Babylon in 323 BC, his empire disintegrated in a series of civil wars fought between his followers.

Alexander founded numerous settlements during his campaigns, naming them after himself or close followers. These have been the subject of intense debate, as the accounts of ancient and medieval scholars differ wildly and are often contradictory. Plutarch provides the maximum estimate of seventy cities in his Life of Alexander, but most texts attest to between ten and twenty foundations. The Greek Alexander Romance lists between nine and thirteen cities, depending on the recension; the Syriac, Armenian, Hebrew, and Ethiopic versions of the Romance also record twelve or thirteen foundations. Persian sources such as al-Tabari, al-Dinawari, Hamza al-Isfahani, and Qudama ascribe between nine and twelve settlements to Alexander. Stephanus of Byzantium recorded around twenty settlements. Some authors additionally document the number of cities established in a specific area: for example, Strabo records that Alexander founded eight cities in Bactria. The accounts of Alexander's campaigns, primarily those of Arrian, Plutarch, Diodorus, Curtius Rufus, and Justin, provide supplementary evidence. Finally, the geographers Eratosthenes, Ptolemy, and Pliny draw upon the otherwise-lost evidence of Alexander's bematist distance-measurers.

When attempting to decipher the above sources, modern scholars face numerous problems. Classical writers tended to name every settlement a polis (πόλις, 'city'), from large population centres to small military garrisons; this leads to much confusion, especially considering the possibility that a settlement started out as a military colony and only later grew into a true polis. Although it is often said that Alexander named all his foundations after himself, this is incorrect; nonetheless, the abundance of these settlements led to many taking on epithets such as Eschate or Oxeiana. As some settlements may have taken on multiple such sobriquets, it is likely that "different authors, undoubtedly reflecting different local traditions, might have been referring to the same Alexandreia by different epithets", in the words of the historian Getzel Cohen. In addition, the precise locations of many foundations are unknown. The classicist William Woodthorpe Tarn noted on the matter that "the difficulties of the subject are considerable, the margin of uncertainty often substantial, the sources of confusion numerous".

== Foundations ==
This list contains settlements established or re-established on the order of Alexander the Great himself, often in his presence and always before his death in 323 BC. It does not include any posthumous foundations or refoundations; nor does it include settlements which only claimed a relationship to the Macedonian king. A discussion of these settlements is found below.

Settlements whose very existence has been questioned are marked as Uncertain; those which are known to exist, but on whose foundation theories scholars disagree, are marked as Disputed; and the settlements which are both known to exist and which are acknowledged by scholars as foundations of Alexander are marked as Accepted.

Settlements
| Settlement name Alternative name(s) | Year founded | Location | Description | Historical authenticity |
|---|---|---|---|---|
| Alexandria Troas | 334 BC | The Troad, modern Çanakkale, Turkey | Alexandria Troas is most commonly identified as a 311 BC foundation of Antigonus I, which was refounded a decade later by Lysimachus, another of the Diadochi. The historian W. W. Tarn however theorized that it was a foundation of Alexander; identifying it as Alexander of the Granicus, Tarn asserted that Alexander promised to build a city as a remembrance of his recent victory on the Granicus. This identification is rejected by historians such as Cohen and Fraser. | Disputed |
| Samareia | 332–331 BC | Modern Sebastia, State of Palestine | Curtius Rufus recorded that the inhabitants of Samareia rebelled while Alexander was in Egypt; on his return, he punished the rebels and settled Macedonians in the area. It is probable that Perdiccas was ordered to settle the city; alternatively, Victor Tcherikover speculated that he might have refounded the city after Alexander's death in 323 BC. Josephus noted that the inhabitants regained their ruler's favour and were granted permission to rebuild their temple and defences. | Disputed |
| Alexandria near Egypt | 331 BC | Alexandria, Egypt | The first major foundation of Alexander's reign, Alexandria was established on the western Nile Delta between Lake Mareotis and the Mediterranean Sea in early 331 BC. Whether the city was founded before or after Alexander's visit to the Siwa Oasis is disputed; his motives for founding Alexandria are also controversial, with military, political, economic and trading factors often cited. The settlement would later grow into one of the most important cities in the world, with an estimated population of 500,000–600,000 in 1 AD. | Accepted |
| Gerasa Antioch on the Chrysorhoas | 331 BC | Jerash, Jordan | A late tradition mentioned by Iamblichus connecting the name "Gerasa" to Alexander is probably fanciful. Roman coins found at the site, minted under Septimius Severus, Caracalla, and Elagabalus, are engraved with imagery and inscriptions relating to Alexander, while a pedestal, dated to the early third century BC, mentions the Diadochus Perdiccas. It is thus considered possible that Perdiccas established the settlement on Alexander's orders. However, the epigraphic, numismatic, and literary evidence is late, and it is very possible that the connection to Alexander was a later fabrication. | Disputed |
| Alexandria Ariana | 330 BC | Near modern Herat, Afghanistan | The existence of Alexandria Ariana is attested to by geographers such as Eratosthenes and Pliny and the Islamic chroniclers al-Tabari and Yaqut al-Hamawi, but not by Greek historians such as Arrian or Diodorus Siculus. It is generally accepted that the city was located close to present-day Herat, which is situated in a fertile oasis and on several trade routes; its precise location is unknown because Herat has not been excavated. Alexandria Ariana has sometimes been identified as a refoundation of the Achaemenid settlement Artacoana, but as the available sources outline a clear distinction between the two localities, this is considered unlikely. | Accepted |
| Alexandria Arachosia | 330 BC | Kandahar, Afghanistan | Various sources attest to the existence of a city called Alexandria in Arachosia, Arachotoi, or Arachosiorum oppidum; however, the biographers Arrian and Justin do not mention such a city. Both Fraser and Cohen emphasise that identifying the above names as the same city is an assumption, albeit strong. If true, Alexandria in Arachosia is traditionally identified with Old Kandahar. There is epigraphic evidence to support this theory, with Greek inscriptions such as the Chehel Zina Edict and the Sophytos dedication found in the area. In addition, the early Islamic polymath al-Khwarizmi identified Kandahar as an "Alexandria of the east". | Accepted |
| Alexandria Eschate | 329 BC | Likely near Khujand, Tajikistan | Arrian records that shortly after besieging Cyropolis, Alexander founded a settlement on the lower Jaxartes to defend the area against Scythian tribesmen. The construction of the city took three weeks, and it was settled with Greek mercenaries, local tribesmen, and injured Macedonian veterans. It has traditionally been identified with Khujand, which controlled the Bukhara-Samarkand trade route and the entrance to the fertile Ferghana Valley. Excavations of the modern city have suggested that the Achaemenids had occupied the site. As the refoundation of Cyropolis, a settlement founded by Cyrus the Great, Alexandria Eschate was culturally and militarily important; Fraser terms it "the most politically significant [foundation] since Alexandria in Egypt". | Accepted |
| Alexandria in the Caucasus Alexandria in Parapamisdai | 329 BC | Near the Hindu Kush | All the major historians and Pliny attest to the existence of this settlement, but none use its primary modern toponym. Alexander settled 7,000 natives here alongside 3,000 retired soldiers after journeying from Prophthasia. Returning the following spring, he dismissed the hyparch he had placed in charge and appointed the Companion Nikanor instead. The existence of Alexandria in the Caucasus is generally accepted, but its location is unknown; most theories place it south of the Hindu Kush near modern Begram. | Accepted |
| Alexandria in Margiana | 328 BC | Gyaur-Kala, Turkmenistan | Pliny was the first to attest to the existence of this settlement; he was followed by Strabo, who added that Antiochus I rebuilt the fortifications and founded a city he called Antioch. This latter name is mentioned in the accounts of Ptolemy and Isidore of Charax. Antiochus' walls have been identified at Gyaur-Kala near Merv, which appears as a foundation of Alexander in Muslim sources such as al-Tabari, al-Dinawari, Hamza al-Isfahani, and Qudama. However, there is considerable debate on whether Alexander founded the settlement, or the later Seleucids. | Disputed |
| Boukephala and Nikaia | 326 BC | On opposite sides of the Hydaspes river, Pakistan | According to Arrian, shortly after defeating the Indian king Porus in battle on the Hydaspes River, Alexander founded two cities facing each other across the river. The battle had taken place on the eastern bank, so Alexander named the eastern city Nikaia; he gave the western city the name Bucephala, after his favourite stallion who had recently died. The location of the cities is unknown: some place them at present-day Jhelum, while others place them thirty miles south at Jalalpur. Considering the marshy nature of the ground and the frequent monsoons, it is unlikely much archaeological evidence could be found. Bucephela survived until the first century AD; much less is known about Nikaia. | Accepted |
| Alexandria in Orietai Alexandria Rhambakia | 325 BC | Near the mouth of the Indus River in Balochistan, Pakistan | Alexander invaded the territory of the Oritae tribe on his march back from India, taking their headquarters at Rhambakia. Arrian records that he approved of the location and ordered Hephaistion and Leonnatus to construct and settle the city, respectively. Diodorus notes that he named it Alexandria, while Curtius Rufus states that its settlers came from Arachosia. Its purpose was likely to control trade routes, with a harbour for naval trade and access to the strategically important mountain passes of the region. Its location is in doubt, as the coastline has changed significantly since antiquity; one hypothesis places it near present-day Welpat, while another locates the settlement on the Miani Hor lagoon. | Uncertain |
| Charax Spasinu Alexandria in Susiana | 324 BC | Likely Naysan, Iraq | Sometimes given the toponym Alexandria in Susiana by modern historians, Charax Spasinu was the later name of a settlement founded by Alexander on the confluence of the Tigris and the Euphrates. The foundation of the settlement was attested to by both Arrian and Pliny the Elder. Likely established to serve as an entrepôt for Babylon, it was later refounded as Antioch by an unknown Seleucid king (probably Antiochus IV Epiphanes) after being damaged by floods. It was again refounded c. 141 BC by the Iranian prince Hyspaosines, who renamed it Spasinou Charax after himself. Although probably located at Naysan in modern Iraq, the city's location has been disputed as the region's hydrography has near-continuously changed since antiquity. | Accepted |
| Alexandria near Babylon | Unknown | Unknown | Serious problems surround the identification of this settlement, whose existence was claimed by versions of the Alexander Romance, Yaqut al-Hamawi, and the Cyranides, who located it near Babylon in Lower Mesopotamia. If it existed, it may have been founded by the Seleucid dynasty, although there is no evidence that they named cities after Alexander. Various scholars identify it as identical with other attested Alexandrias, such as Charax Spasinu, Seleucia-on-the-Hedyphon, Alexandria near the Pallakopas, and Alexandria on the Tigris. | Uncertain |

Plan of Alexandria in Egypt during the Ptolemaic dynasty

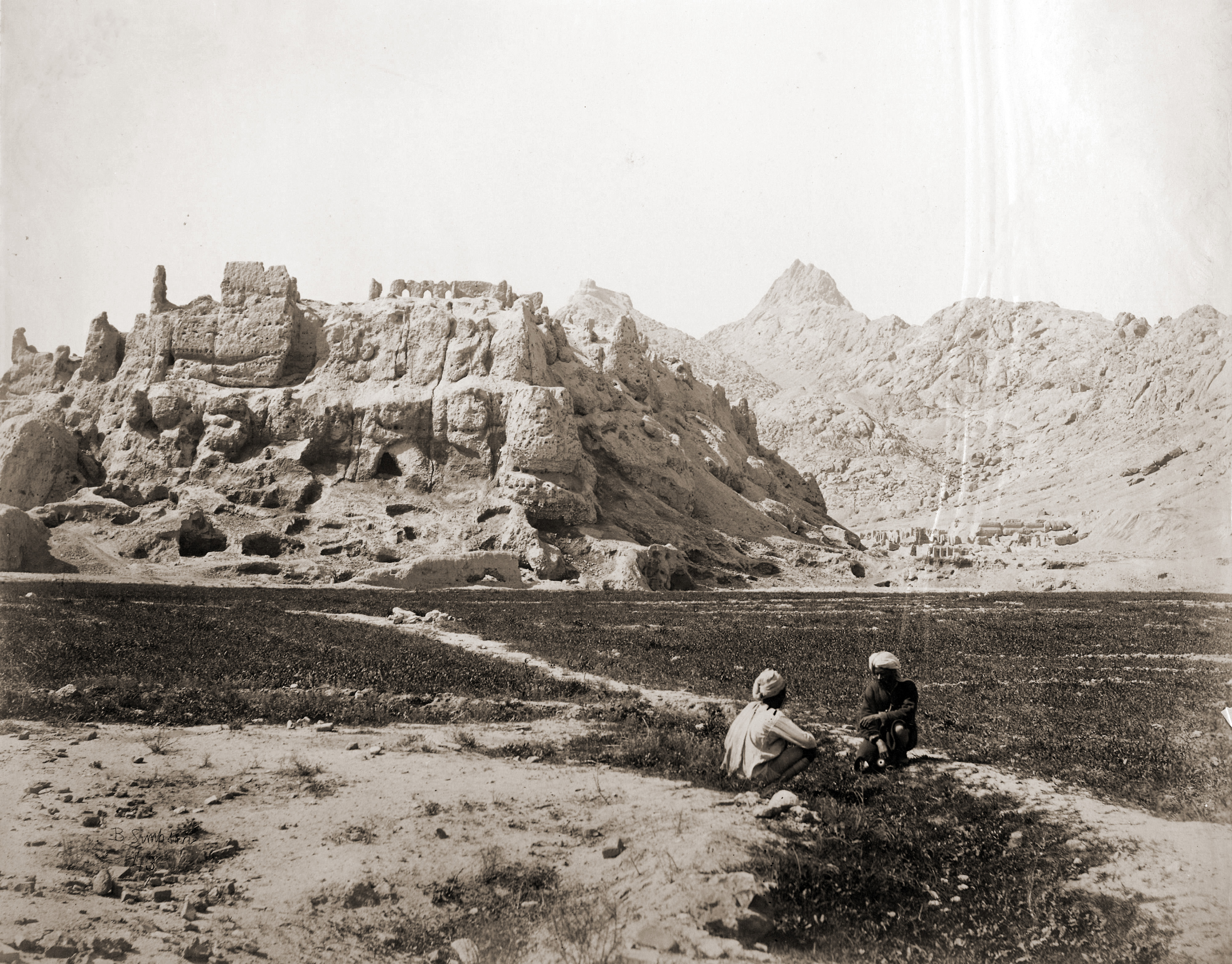
Ruins of the 19th-century citadel of Kandahar. A settlement on the same site may have been captured or founded by Alexander.

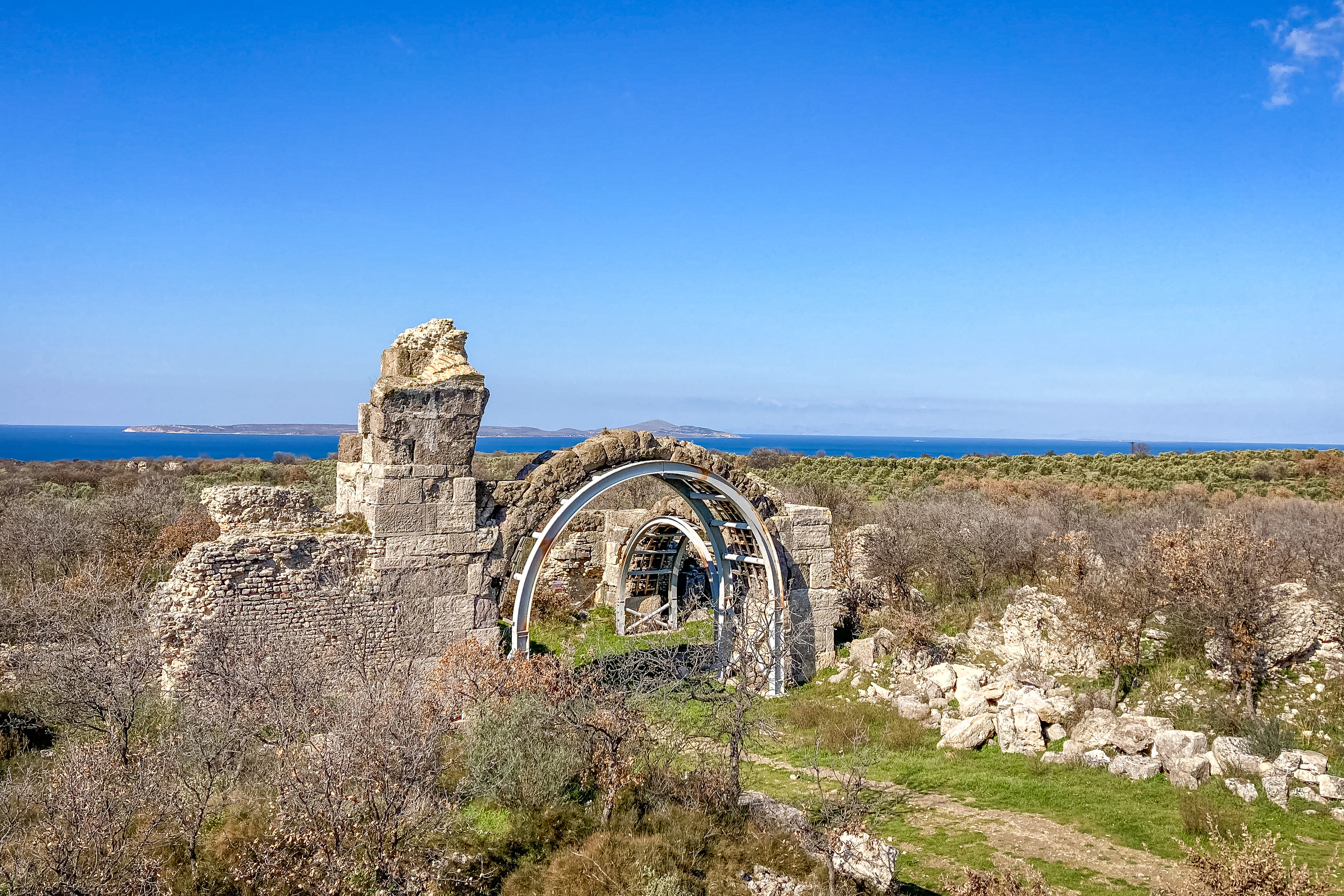
The ruins of Alexandria Troas, which W. W. Tarn theorized was founded by Alexander.

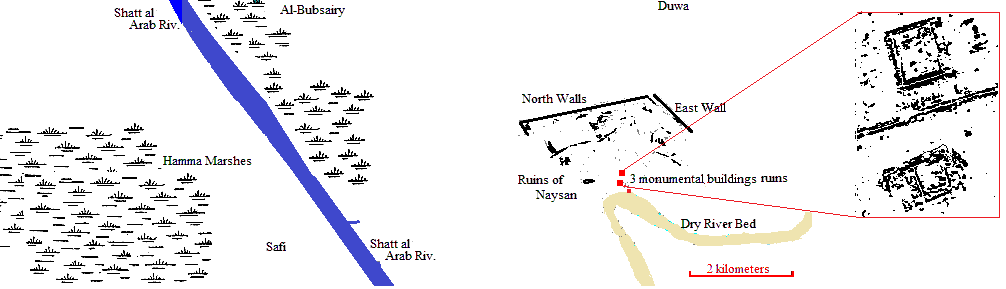
Plan of the archaeological site of Naysan, the probable location of Charax Spasinu

== Other settlements ==
=== Europe ===
While Philip II was besieging Perinthus, Alexander, as regent, subdued the Maedi, a Thracian tribe, in what is now southwestern Bulgaria. According to Plutarch, he founded a small settlement in the region and named it Alexandropolis; the name mirrored his father's foundation of Philippopolis and was probably given on Philip's order. The settlement's site is unknown, and some scholars have found its historicity questionable.

=== Asia Minor ===
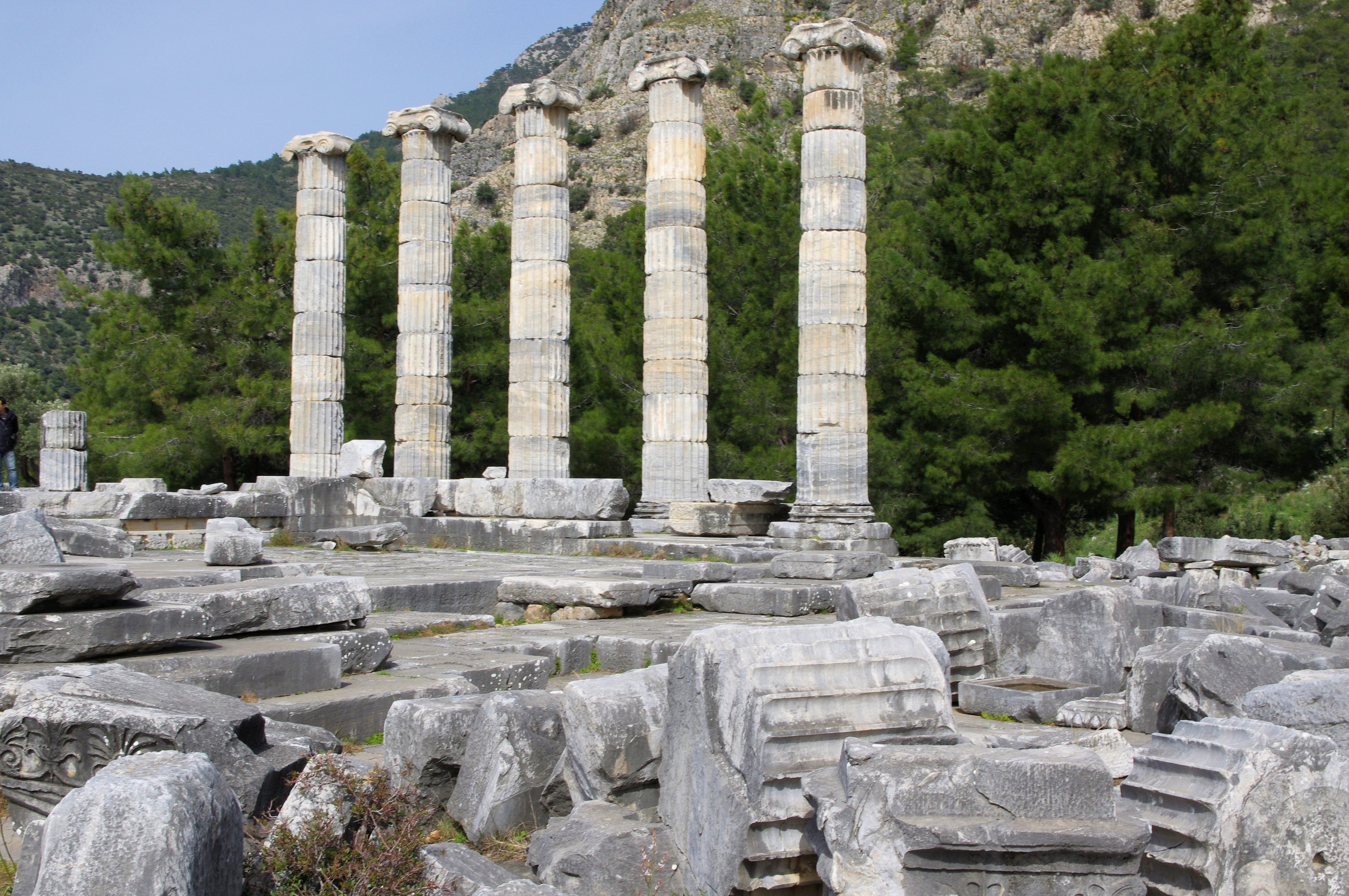
The Temple of Athena at Priene

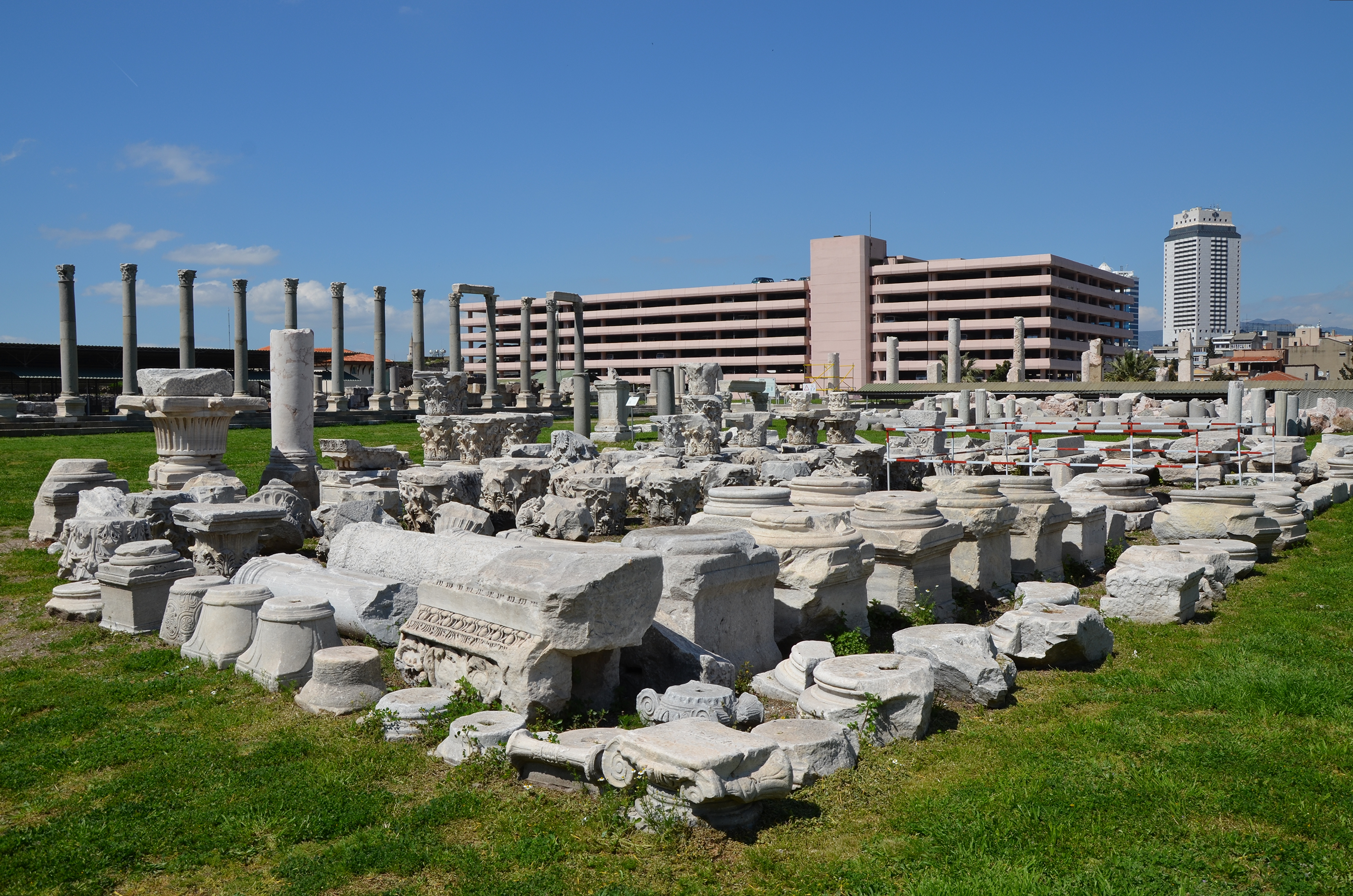
The agora of ancient Smyrna

Many ancient settlements claimed a significant relationship to Alexander. In Asia Minor, such cities included Ilion, Priene, and Smyrna. In 334 BC, Alexander visited Ilion, site of the ruined Troy. He ordered that the town be made exempt from taxes and its buildings be rebuilt; he later promised to make Ilion a great city. However, none of these plans came to fruition in Alexander's lifetime. A local tribe called the Alexandris were probably named after the legendary Paris, sometimes called Alexander, not the Macedonian king. Although Alexander certainly took a great interest in Priene (including dedicating the city's temple to Athena and granting exemptions to the populace), and even though it is probable that the town was refounded in the late fourth century, there is no direct evidence to claim Alexander carried it out. Excavations of the site could not find pre-Hellenistic remains. While the later authors Pausanias, Pliny, and Aelius Aristides recorded traditions which held that Alexander refounded Smyrna, Strabo, writing in the first century BC, instead noted that the settlement was revived by Antigonus I Monophthalmus after Alexander's death. Other settlements in the region, with much less viable claims, include Aegae, Alexandria by the Latmos, Amorium, Apollonia, Chrysopolis, Eukarpia, Kretopolis, Nicaea, and Otrus.

=== Egypt, Phoenicia, and Syria ===
In Syria, the city of Antioch, later to become one of the major cities of the ancient world, claimed a relationship with Alexander. According to Libanius, a 4th-century AD native of the city, Alexander planned to found a city on the future site of Antioch but did not have enough time to do so; he instead set up a shrine to Zeus and a small fortress. It is likely that this tradition was merely a local legend. The nearby settlement of Alexandria by Issus, located in the general area of modern İskenderun, is only recorded as a foundation of Alexander by Pseudo-Scymnus, and some recensions of the Alexander Romance; a seal found nearby bears the king's portrait. Considering the emphasis on Alexandria in Egypt as his first foundation, it is considered very unlikely that Alexander founded the settlement, although it almost certainly existed. In Phoenicia and Egypt, the cities of Gaza and Tyre are sometimes recorded as refoundations of Alexander. Tyre was besieged and destroyed in 332 BC, and Gaza experienced a similar fate later in the same year. Although Alexander rebuilt and resettled both cities, they are not usually considered foundations, but rather large-scale rehabilitations. Other less well-supported claims include that of Alexandroschene, Capitolias, Dion, Larisa Sizara, Nikopolis, Paraitonion, Pella, and Seleucia Abila.

=== The eastern provinces ===
In Mesopotamia, Nikephorion (present-day Raqqa) was occasionally attributed to Alexander, but it was more probably founded by Seleucus I. The 19th-century Orientalist H. C. Rawlinson proposed that the Macedonian king founded a settlement shortly after and near the Battle of Gaugamela in Assyria. There are numerous attestations that Alexander founded a city in Lower Mesopotamia: many city-names such as Seleucia-on-the-Hedyphon, Alexandria near Babylon, Alexandria near the Pallakopas, and Alexandria on the Tigris have been proposed; but it is likely that some of these names refer to the same city. Alexandria Carmania may have been founded in Carmania, but its existence is only weakly supported; if it existed, it was likely a later foundation. Similarly, the Altars of Alexander and the Portus Macedonum, reputedly located near Carmania, may have been elephant-hunting stations established by Nearchus. A settlement named Alexandropolis was supposedly founded near Nysa, but there is no evidence to support a foundation so soon after the army's passage of the Caspian Gates.

Further east, Alexandria in Sakastane was likely founded after Alexander's death and only then attributed to him. Many Alexandrias are attested to regions of Bactria, Sogdiana, and the Indian subcontinent; however, most are considered to be different names for the same settlement. Thus, Alexandria Opiane and Alexandria Kapisa are considered to be names for Alexandria in the Caucasus; Alexandria near Baktra and Alexandria Oxiana may both refer to the same problematic settlement; while in India, the settlements of Taxila and Patala probably existed, but Alexander likely founded neither. Quintus Curtius Rufus wrote that Alexander founded several cities in the Indus Delta, but these were probably only garrisons.
