= Al-Bubsairy =

Al-Bubsairy البوبصيري
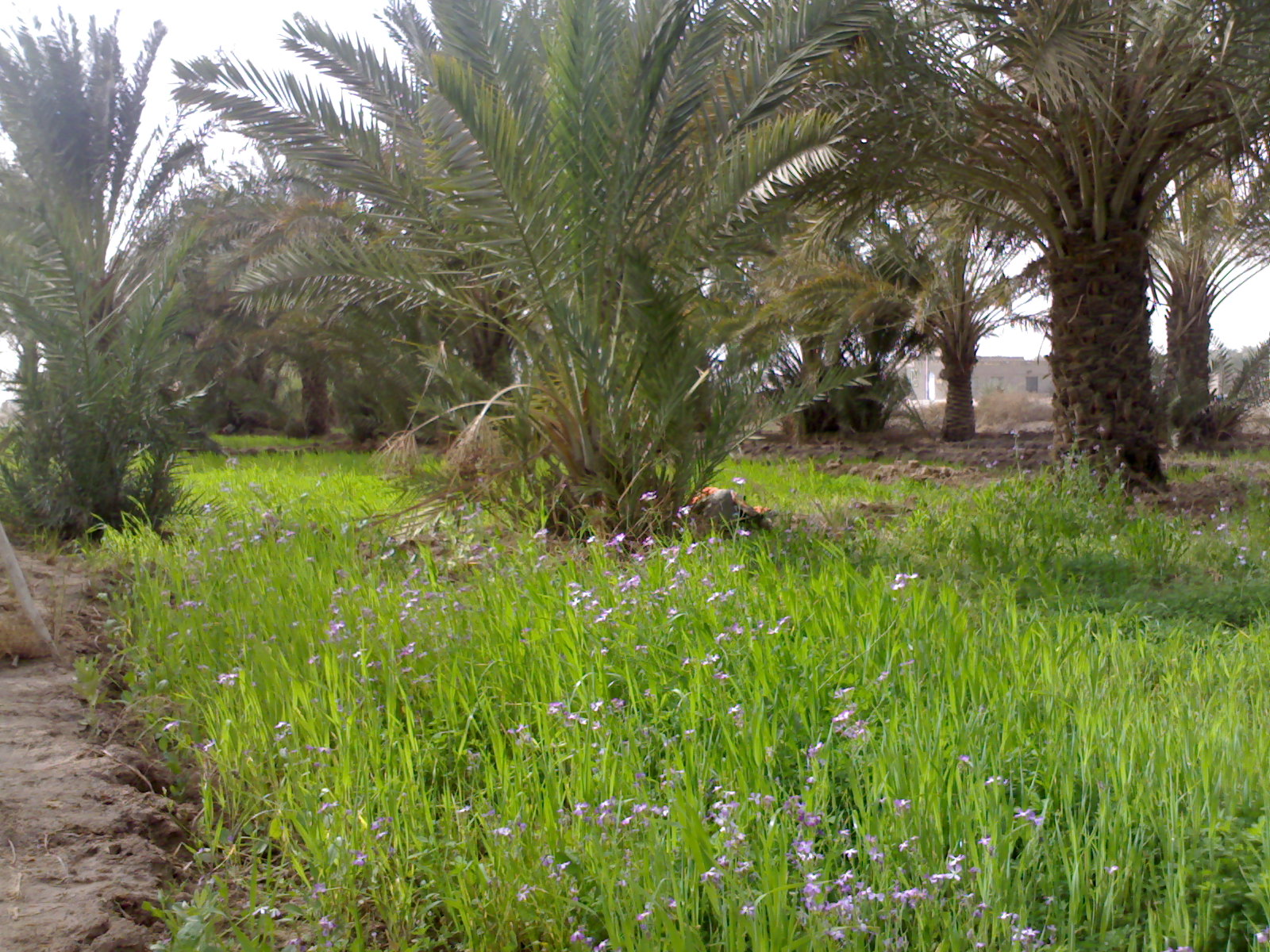
- A farm in area of Al-Bubsairy.
- Country: Iraq
- Governorate: Basra
- Seat: Al-Qurnah
- Time zone: UTC+3 (AST)

Al-Bubsairy (البوبصيري ) is a village on the Shatt El Arab in Iraq, inhabited by Marsh Arabs. It is located at 30°53'48.5"N 47°32'16.9"E, south of Al Qurnah, and in Al-Qurna District.

== History ==
Alexander the Great founded the town of Charax Spasinu in 324 B.C. on the river bank here. That town later became the capital of the Characene kingdom but now exists as the ruins of Naysan.

The area is close to the Mesopotamian Marshes (Hammar Marshes), and has traditionally been home to many Marsh Arabs. The village has a school.

The area suffered greatly during the Iran–Iraq War, during which it was a major battlefield, and again after the 1991 Iraqi uprising.
