= Seleucia (disambiguation) =

Seleucia on the Tigris (Ancient Greek: Σελεύκεια, Seleúkeia, lit. "place of Seleucus") was the first capital of the Seleucid Empire and one of the great cities of antiquity but is now an abandoned ruin.

Seleucia also prominently refers to Seleucia Pieria, the port of Antioch at the mouth of the Orontes, now the city of Samandağı, Turkey.

Seleucia may also refer to:

== Places ==
- Seleucia, a Byzantine theme of the 9th–12th centuries centered in Seleucia in Isauria
- Seleucia or Abila (Decapolis), a former settlement near modern Irbid, Jordan
- Seleucia, a former name of Umm Qais, Jordan
- Seleucia ad Belum, later Seleucobelus, a former settlement at the headwater of the Orontes in Syria
- Seleucia ad Eulaeum or Seleucia on the Eulaeus, a former name of Susa, Iran
- Seleucia ad Maeandrum, a former name of Aydın, Turkey
- Seleucia ad Pyramum or Mopsuestia, now in Adana Province, Turkey
- Seleucia at the Zeugma, a former settlement probably near Sırataşlar, Turkey
- Seleucia by the Sea, a former name of Samandağı, Turkey
- Seleucia-Ctesiphon, bishopric in Assyria (now Iraq), diocesan precursor of the Chaldean Catholic patriarchate of Babylon
- Seleucia in Caria, a former name of Aydın, Turkey
- Seleucia in Isauria, a former name of Silifke, Turkey
- Seleucia on the Calycadnus, a former name of Silifke, Turkey
- Seleucia on the Euphrates, a former name of Zeugma, Turkey
- Seleucia Ferrea, a former settlement and diocese at Selef, Turkey
- Seleucia on Hedyphon, a former settlement in Kirkuk, Iraq
- Seleucia Pamphylia, a former settlement at Bucakşeyhler, Turkey
- Seleucia Pieria (Seleucia by the Sea), the seaport of Antioch ad Orontes (Syria Prima)
- Seleucia Samulias on the former Lake Merom in Israel
- Seleucia Sidera in Pisidia, a former settlement at Selef, Turkey
- Seleucia Sittacene, a former settlement located on the Tigris shore opposite the more famous Seleucia
- Seleucia Susiana, a former settlement at Ja Nishin, Iran
- Seleucia Tracheotis, a former name of Silifke, Turkey

== Religion ==
- Patriarchal Province of Seleucia-Ctesiphon, central ecclesiastical province of the Church of the East

== Biology ==
- Seleucia (moth), a genus of moths in the family Pyralidae

== See also ==
- Seleucus (disambiguation)
- Seleucid Empire
- Seleuciana
- Seleucobelus
