= Alexandria Ariana =

Ancient city in Afghanistan

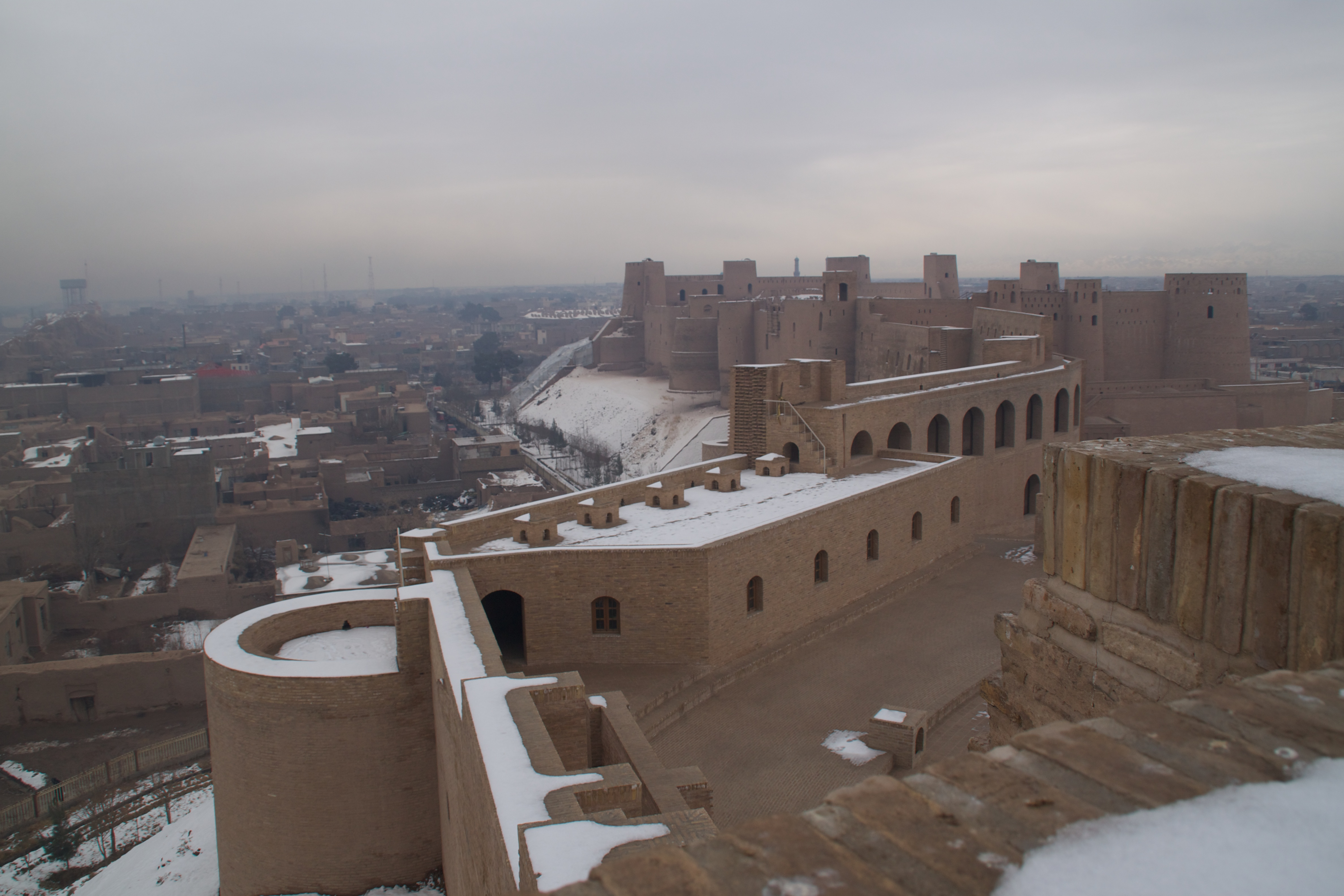
The Herat Citadel, which may be built over Alexander the Great's settlement.

Alexandria Ariana was a settlement founded by Alexander the Great in 330 BC during his invasion of Persia and Central Asia. The city was the first of many founded by Alexander to be established in the eastern satrapies of the crumbling Achaemenid Empire. The remains of the ancient city lie in the general area of the modern settlement of Herat, Afghanistan, in the ancient regions of Aria and Ariana. There has been extensive historical debate regarding the relationship of Alexander's foundation to the Achaemenid citadel of Artacoana, its predecessor. As no excavations of Herat have taken place, the precise location of Alexandria Ariana is unknown.

== History ==
The foundation of Alexandria Ariana, like that of many other settlements founded by Alexander the Great, was not mentioned by his biographers Arrian, Diodorus Siculus and Quintus Curtius Rufus, who merely note that Alexander advanced through Ariana from Hyrcania towards Bactria, and then returned to subdue Satibarzanes, the former satrap of the Achaemenid Empire, who was fomenting rebellion in the region. The city was however mentioned by Alexander's bematists (distance-measurers), who are cited in the works of the geographers Eratosthenes and Pliny the Elder. The name of the city in Greek was 'Alexandria among the Ar[e]ians' (Ἀλεξάνδρεια ἡ ἐν Ἀρ[ε]ίοις) or 'Alexandria of the Areians' (Ἀλεξάνδρεια ἡ ἐν Ἀρείων).

According to the geographer Strabo, there were three cities in Aria, each named after their founder: Alexandria Ariana, Artacoana, and a settlement known as Achaia. Artacoana (sometimes spelt Artakoana or Artacabene) was the primary citadel of the Achaemenid satrapy of Aria, and may have been a battle-site during the revolt of Satibarzanes. It has been suggested by historians, notably Wilhelm Tomaschek, that Artacoana and Alexandria Ariana referred to the same city; Tomaschek hypothesised that the former referred primarily to the citadel, while the latter referred to the less-fortified lower town. As ancient sources such as Strabo, Isidore of Charax, Pliny, and Ptolemy distinctly differentiate between Artacoana and Alexandria, the scholarly consensus is that there were two separate cities. It is likely that Artacoana existed for several centuries after the foundation of Alexandria Ariana, although its location is unknown. A reference in Pliny's Natural History to Artacoana and Artacabene as two separate nearby cities is almost certainly a mistake.

=== Location ===
It is generally accepted that Alexandria Ariana is located in the vicinity of the modern city of Herat, Afghanistan. This hypothesis is supported by the Perso-Islamic authors al-Tabari, Hamza al-Isfahani, and Qudama ibn Ja'far, who record that Herat was founded by Alexander, albeit without referring to it as an Iskandariya, the common Arabic word for cities founded by Alexander. The oasis city of Herat was surrounded by very fertile land which allowed a more sedentary lifestyle than most of the region. The Hari Rud river was a focal point of trade routes eastwards to Arachosia and northwards to Balkh; it also served as a strategic choke point as the river valley is never more than 25 km (16 mi) wide. The strategic and economic importance of the area was already evident by the time of Alexander: Satibarzanes was one of the three highest-ranking officials in the eastern Achaemenid Empire under Darius III, alongside Barsaentes of Arachosia and Bessus of Bactria.

Historians have not been able to locate Alexandria Ariana precisely because no large-scale excavations in Herat or the surrounding regions have been undertaken. The old town of Herat, with access to the river to the south, protected by the northern mountains, and centered on the present citadel structure, is generally seen as the most likely site of Alexandria Ariana. The current citadel was initially constructed shortly after the Islamic conquest and has been rebuilt many times since then. Although the citadel's tell seems to be the most likely site for a Macedonian stronghold, an excavation which would allow a conclusion to be drawn is improbable due to the size of the earthworks.
