= Tahtacı =

Ethnoreligious group

Tahtacılar
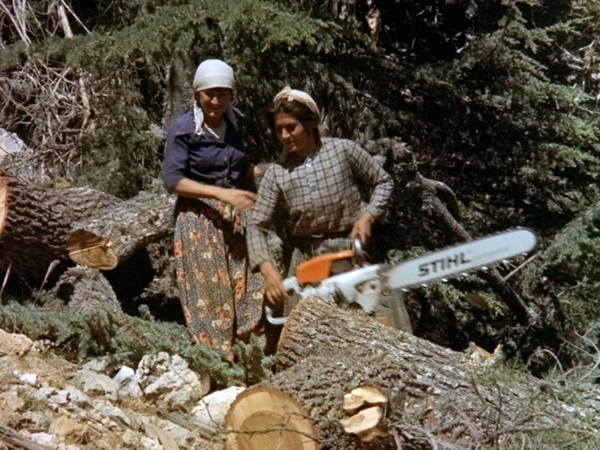
- Tahtacı women

Total population
- 300,000–500,000 (1987)

Regions with significant populations
- Turkey; Mediterranean Region, Aegean Region

Languages
- Turkish

Religion
- Islam (Alevism)

Related ethnic groups
- Turkish people and other Turkic peoples

Tahtacı (Turkish: Tahtacılar, lit. 'woodworkers') are a subgroup of ethnic Turkish people living mainly in the forested areas of Aegean and Mediterranean regions of Turkey.

Historically engaged in woodworking since the Ottoman period, they trace their origins to the Üçok Turkomans. Due to their Alevi faith, they often lived in secluded areas, preserving a unique blend of Tengrism and Alevi-Bektashi traditions. Their cultural heritage is reflected in their craftsmanship, rituals, and way of life, which remain closely tied to nature.

== History ==
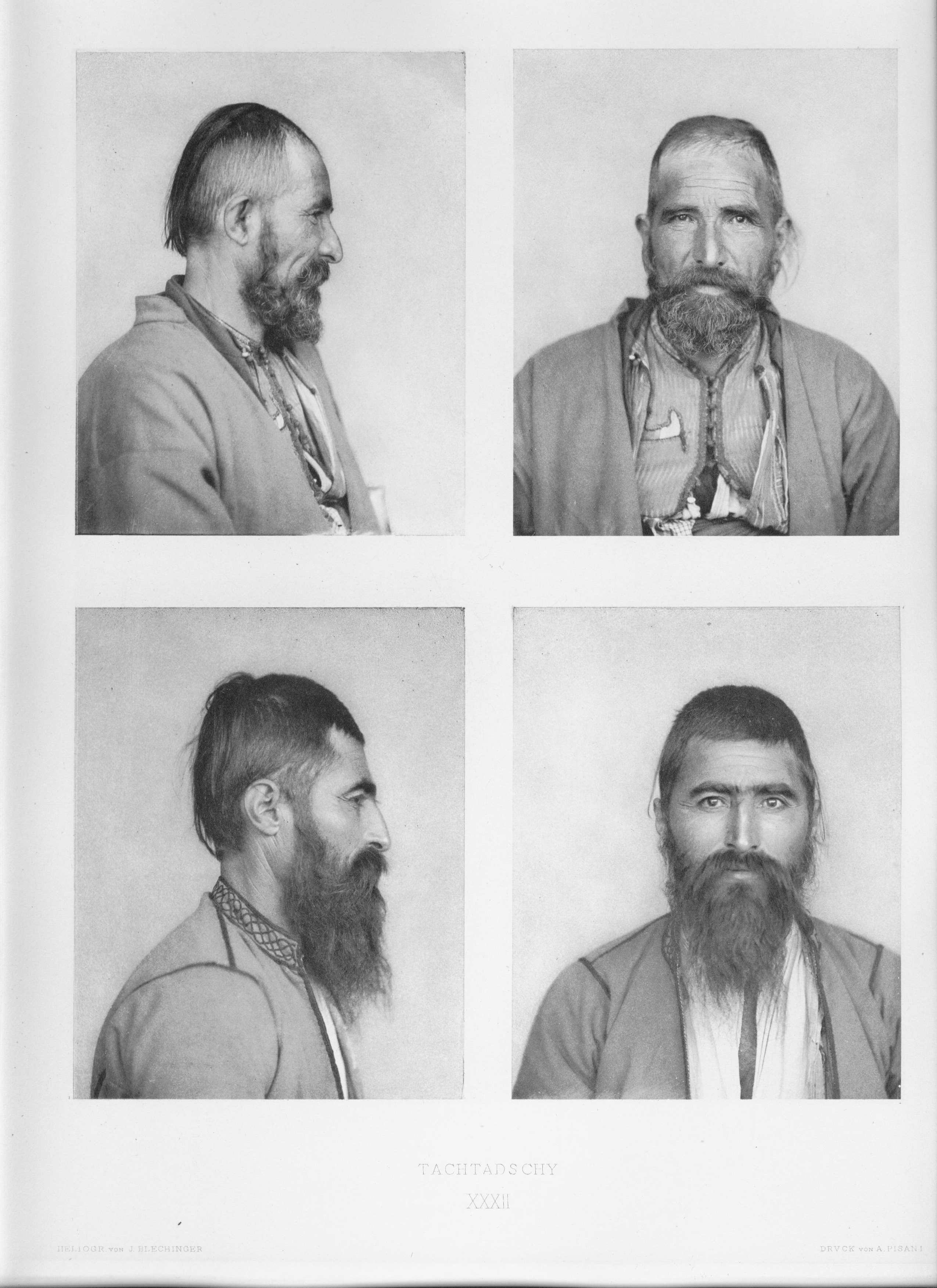
Illustration of physical characteristics of male Tahtacı

Tahtacı originate from the Üçok (lit. 'three arrow') Turkomans. The Tahtacı in Taurus Mountains felled timber, which was then sent from Antalya, Alanya, Finike and other ports. The export of timber was a government monopoly, customs receipts from timber and pitch reaching about 3,500 gold ducats in 1477.

When Timur took Turkestan and Greater Khorasan under his rule, some of the Agaceris, who had to leave their homeland, settled in Iran and the majority in Anatolia. According to some other sources, a great migration wave took place in 466, and the Agaceri tribes belonging to the Huns came and settled in Anatolia. After the invasion of Anatolia by the Mongols, Agaceris who came here migrated to Syria and Iraq this time to hide from the Mongols. It is accepted that some of them returned to Anatolia in 1405 after Timur's death and were known as 'Tahtacı' from this period. It is known that Mehmed the Conqueror brought Tahtacı people from the villages in the Kaz Mountains of Balıkesir for the construction of the ships used during the conquest of Istanbul in 1453. In the written sources, the name Tahtacı is first encountered in the Ottoman tax population cadastral registers in the 16th century as Cemāat-ı Tahtacıyān (lit. 'woodworker community').

After the Battle of Chaldiran in 1514, Ottoman Empire under the rule of Selim I started targeting Alevis. This has caused Tahtacı people to move their already secluded lives even to a further extent in forestry areas of Southern and Western Anatolia. As the minority Shiites under Sunni rule of the Ottoman Empire, they frequently requested help and protection from the Safavids, the only Shiite state of the time, and the Ottomans' neighbor and enemy.

== Settlement areas in Turkey ==
Tahtacıs mainly live in Mersin, Adana, Antalya, Denizli, Isparta, Burdur, Muğla, Aydın, İzmir, Manisa, Balıkesir and Çanakkale.

Villages in Mersin Province:

- Toroslar: Dalakderesi, Düğdüören, Bekiralanı, Kuzucubelen
- Erdemli: Tömük
- Silifke: Sayağzı, Kırtıl
- Mut: Yazalanı, Kayabaşı, Keleceköy, Kamaçukuru Köprübaşı
- Tarsus: Çamalan, Kaburgediği
- Anamur: Kaşdişlen
- Bozyazı: Çubukkoyağı, Bahçekoyağı, Tekedüzü

Villages in Antalya Province:

- Elmalı: Akçainiş
- Finike: Alacadağ, Arifköy, Gökbük
- Kumluca: Beşikçi, Hızırkahya, Toptaş
- Manavgat: Dolbazlar, Sağırin

Villages in Balıkesir Province:

- Balıkesir: Türkali
- Burhaniye: Pelitköy, Tahtacı, Taşçılar
- Edremit: Arıtaşı, Çamcı, Doyran, Hacıhasanlar, Kavlaklar, Kızılçukur, Mehmetalan, Poyratlı, Tahtakuşlar, Yassıçalı
- Kepsut: Mehmetler
- Savaştepe: Kongurca

Villages in Çanakkale Province:

- Çanakkale Province: Akçeşme, Aykınoba, Çiftlikdere, Damyeri, Daşbaşı, Değirmendere, Denizgöründü, Elmacık, Gürecik, Kayadere, Kemerdere, Yenimahalle
- Ayvacık: Bahçedere, Çakalini, Çiftlik, Durdağı, Güzelköy, Kokulutaş, Kıztaşı, Uzunalan
- Bayramiç: Güven, Karıncalı
- Ezine: Derbentbaşı, Eğridere, Koşuburun

Villages in Gaziantep Province:

- İslahiye District: Kabaklar, Çerçili

== Religion ==
Tahtacı are Alevi Turkomans. Although there is evidence of Shamanism in their beliefs and lifestyles, this culture they preserve has blended with and heavily influenced Alevi beliefs and customs over the course of History. Tahtacı Turkomans put their favourite items and clothes in their graves, which is an example of their shamanistic customs. Ahmad Yasawi and Pir Sultan Abdal among others are some of the most respected religious figures among Tahtacı. Bektashism was particularly strong among the Turkomans of Taurus mountains (principally the Tahtaci and Varsak tribes).

== Culture ==
Tahtacı have always lived together with nature throughout history. They have a great cultural richness with their clothing, handicrafts and food cultures. In terms of customs and traditions, they carry traces of Central Asian Turkish culture. Tahtacı men and women work together in woodworking, which they pursue as a craft. Some of them, due to the decreasing public pressure after the declaration of the Republic, started adopting various other jobs.

== Notable Tahtacı ==
- Musa Eroğlu, folk musician and bağlama virtuoso.
