= Arpalı (disambiguation) =

Arpalı is a town and municipality in Bayburt Province, Turkey.

Arpalı may also refer to the following settlements in Turkey:

- Arpalı, İslahiye, a neighbourhood in Gaziantep Province
- Arpalı, Pertek, a village in Tunceli Province
- Arpalı, Şavşat, a village in Artvin Province
