= Kalaycık =

Kalaycık may refer to:

- Kalaycık, İslahiye, neighbourhood in Gaziantep Province, Turkey
- Kalaycık, Kızıltepe, neighbourhood in Mardin Province, Turkey
