= Köklü =

Köklü may refer to the following settlements in Turkey:

- Köklü, Bingöl, a village in Bingöl Province
- Köklü, Kastamonu, a village in Kastamonu Province
- Köklü, İslahiye, a village in Gaziantep Province
- Köklü, Ulus, a village in Bartın Province
