= Ağabey, İslahiye =

Village in Gaziantep Province, Turkey

Ağabey
- Neighbourhood
- Location in Turkey
- Coordinates: 36°58′15″N 36°35′28″E
- Country: Turkey
- Province: Gaziantep
- District: İslahiye
- Population (2022): 390
- Time zone: UTC+3 (TRT)

Ağabey is a neighbourhood in the municipality and district of İslahiye, Gaziantep Province, Turkey. The village had a population of 390 in 2022.
