= Bayraktepe, İslahiye =

Village in Gaziantep Province, Turkey

Bayraktepe
- Neighbourhood
- Location in Turkey
- Coordinates: 37°2′15″N 36°48′5″E
- Country: Turkey
- Province: Gaziantep
- District: İslahiye
- Population (2022): 303
- Time zone: UTC+3 (TRT)

Bayraktepe, historically Çakallar, is a neighbourhood in the municipality and district of İslahiye, Gaziantep Province, Turkey. The village had a population of 303 in 2022.
