= Yeşilyurt, Gaziantep =

Town in Gaziantep Province, Turkey

Yeşilyurt
- Neighbourhood
- Location in Turkey
- Coordinates: 36°54′N 36°34′E
- Country: Turkey
- Province: Gaziantep
- District: İslahiye
- Population (2022): 3,918
- Time zone: UTC+3 (TRT)
- Postal code: 27800
- Area code: 0342

Yeşilyurt (Kurdish: Dolan) is a neighbourhood of the municipality and district of İslahiye, Gaziantep Province, Turkey. Its population is 3,918 (2022). Before the 2013 reorganisation, it was a town (belde). It is populated by Kurds.

== History ==
The town was founded in 1991 as a result of merging the three villages of Dolan, Yenioba and Alagöz. Major economic activities of the town are viticulture and peach gardening.
