= Kayabaşı, İslahiye =

Village in Gaziantep Province, Turkey

Kayabaşı
- Neighbourhood
- Location in Turkey
- Coordinates: 36°55′32″N 36°31′6″E
- Country: Turkey
- Province: Gaziantep
- District: İslahiye
- Population (2022): 953
- Time zone: UTC+3 (TRT)

Kayabaşı is a neighbourhood in the municipality and district of İslahiye, Gaziantep Province, Turkey. Its population is 953 (2022).

== History ==
Kayabaşı; formerly a village as an administrative division, became a neighborhood after the legislative change in 2012.
