= Yelliburun, İslahiye =

Village in Gaziantep Province, Turkey

Yelliburun
- Neighbourhood
- Location in Turkey
- Coordinates: 37°1′21″N 36°43′6″E
- Country: Turkey
- Province: Gaziantep
- District: İslahiye
- Population (2022): 128
- Time zone: UTC+3 (TRT)

Yelliburun is a neighbourhood in the municipality and district of İslahiye, Gaziantep Province, Turkey. The village is populated by Kurds and Arabs, and had a population of 128 in 2022.
