= Kozdere, İslahiye =

Village in Gaziantep Province, Turkey

Kozdere
- Neighbourhood
- Location in Turkey
- Coordinates: 37°7′44″N 36°40′3″E
- Country: Turkey
- Province: Gaziantep
- District: İslahiye
- Population (2022): 810
- Time zone: UTC+3 (TRT)

Kozdere, historically İntilli, is a neighbourhood in the municipality and district of İslahiye, Gaziantep Province, Turkey. Its population is 810 (2022). The village is populated by Kurds.
