= Satibarzanes =

Persian satrap (died 330 BC)

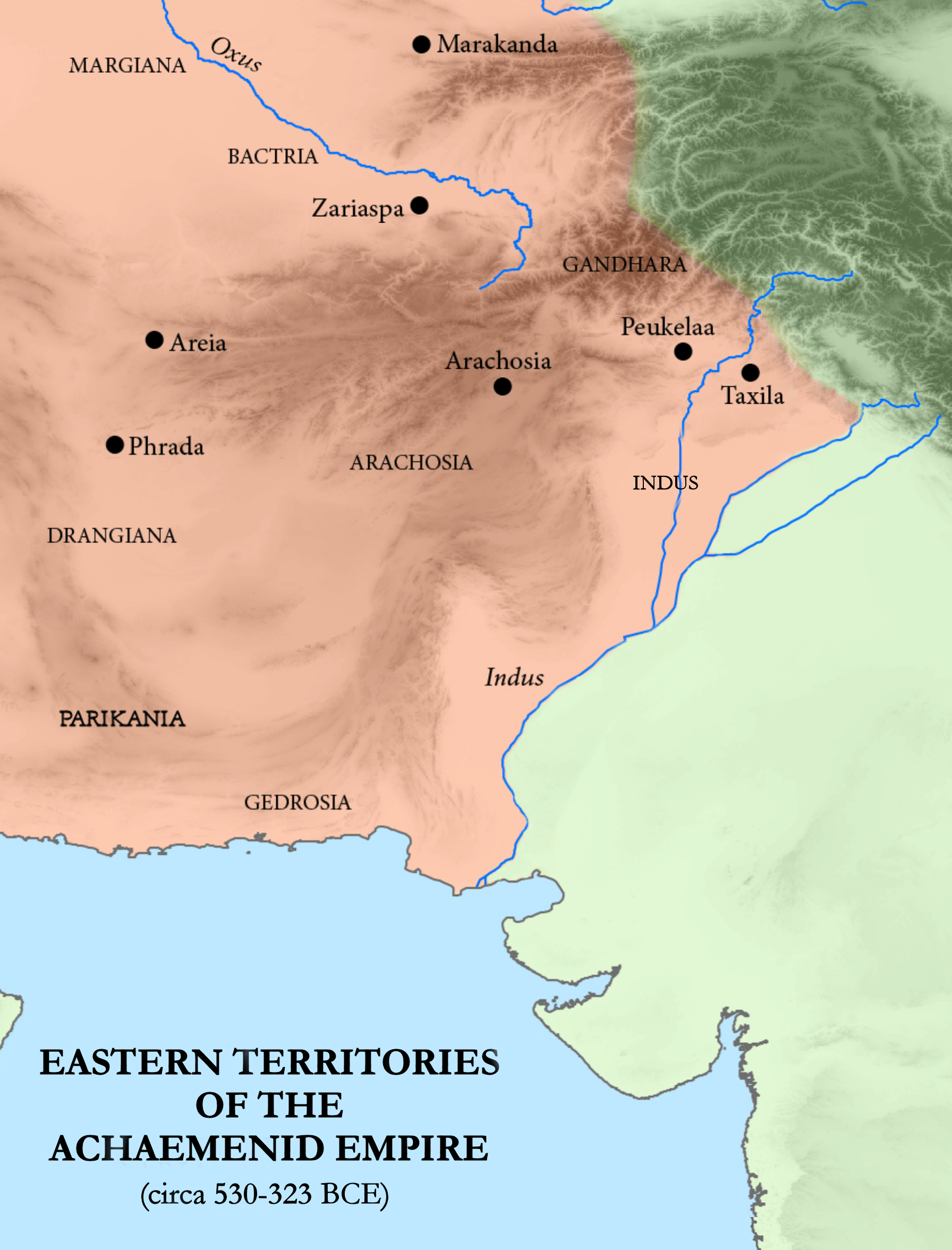
Eastern territories of the Achaemenid Empire, including Aria (around the city of Areia).

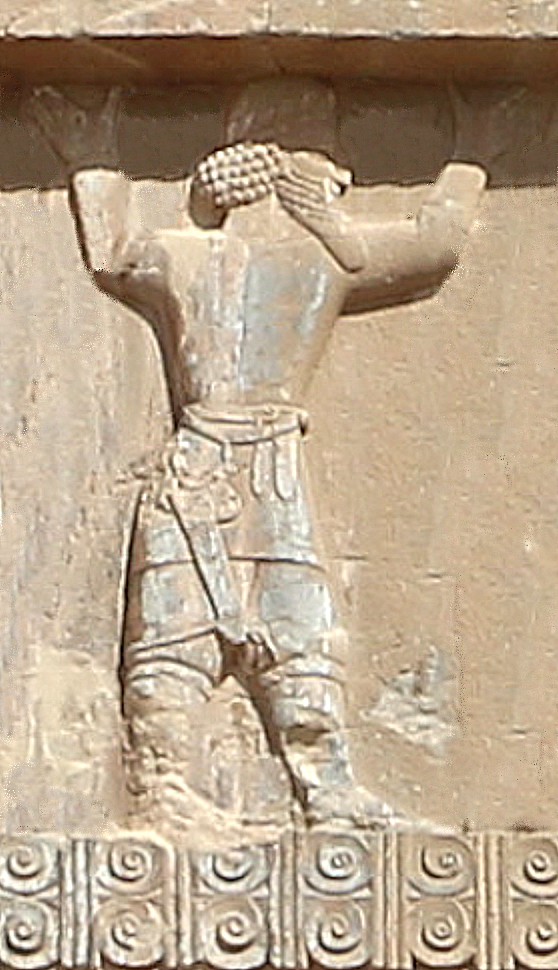
Arian soldier, on a relief of the tomb of Artaxerxes III (circa 338 BCE).

Satibarzanes (Old Persian: *Šyātibr̥zaⁿs; Ancient Greek: Σατιβαρζάνης Satibarzánēs; died 330 BC), a Persian, was satrap of Aria under Darius III, king of Persia.

In 330 BC, Alexander the Great, marching through the borders of Aria on his way from Hyrcania against the Parthians, was met at a city named Susia by Satibarzanes, who made submission to him, and was rewarded for it by the restoration of his satrapy. In order to prevent the commission of any hostilities against the Arians by the Macedonian troops which were following from the west, Alexander left behind with Satibarzanes forty horse-dartmen, under the command of Anaxippus. These, however, together with their commander, were soon after murdered by the satrap, who incited the Arians to rebel, and gathered his forces together at the city of Artacoana.

Hearing of Alexander's approach, he fled to join the traitor Bessus; and the city, after a short siege, was captured by the Macedonians. Towards the end of the same year (330 BC), Alexander, heard that Satibarzanes had again entered Aria with 2000 horses, supplied by Bessus, and had incited the Arians to another revolt. According to Arrian, upon hearing this, he sent a force against him, led by Artabazus, Erigyius, Caranus, and Andronicus of Olynthus. In the battle which ensued, and while the outcome was still in doubt, Satibarzanes came forward and challenged the enemy generals to single combat. The challenge was accepted by Erigyius, and Satibarzanes was slain.
