= Tandır, İslahiye =

Village in Gaziantep Province, Turkey

Tandır
- Neighbourhood
- Location in Turkey
- Coordinates: 36°57′43″N 36°31′16″E
- Country: Turkey
- Province: Gaziantep
- District: İslahiye
- Population (2022): 322
- Time zone: UTC+3 (TRT)

Tandır is a neighbourhood in the municipality and district of İslahiye, Gaziantep Province, Turkey. Its population is 322 (2022).
