= İslahiye District Public Library =

Public library in Turkey

İslahite District Public Library
- İslahiye Sabiha-Aziz Bali İlçe Halk Kütüphanesi
- 37°01′24″N 36°38′07″E
- Location: Santral Cad.. 21, Hacıali Öztürk Mah., İslahiye Gaziantep, Turkey
- Established: 21 August 2020; 6 years ago
- Service area: İslahiye

İslahiye District Public Library, officially İslahiye Sabiha-Aziz Bali District Public Library (Turkish: İslahiye Sabiha-Aziz Bali İlçe Halk Kütüphanesi), is a public library in the İslahiye district of Gaziantep Province in southeastern Turkey, opening in 2020 in a repurposed prison.

== History ==
İslahiye Prison (Turkish: İslahiye A2 Tipi Kapalı Ceza İnfaz Kurumu) was established on Santral St. 21 at Hacıali Öztürk neighborhood of İslahiye district in Gaziantep Province as a district penitentiary of type-A2 in 1958. Operated by the General Directorate for Penitentiary and Detention Centers (Turkish: Ceza ve Tevkifevleri Genel Müdürlüğü), part of the Ministry of Justice, the closed-category prison had four wards capable of 40 inmates.

By August 2019, the prison was closed down, and the 25 inmates were transferred to the type-L prison in Kilis. It was replaced with a new prison of type-T for 1,600 inmates, 600 detainees and 1,000 convicts, on the highway D.825 between Nurdağı and İslahiye to meet the needs of the region.

== Redevelopment project ==
The prison building was converted into a library after restoration works financed by Adnan Bali, CEO of İşbank, one of the major commercial banks in Turkey. It was named "Sabiha-Aziz Bali District Public Library" (Sabiha-Aziz Bali İlçe Halk Kütüphanesi) in honor of Adnan Bali's parents "Sabiha-Aziz Bali Library". One year after the closing of the 61-year old prison, the library opened in a ceremony attended by local politicians on 21 August 2020.

Adnan Bali grew up in İslahiye, a small southern town. His father Aziz Bali, a local government official with limited income, built up a private home library to teach his children. His mother Sabiha Bali, who died in 2019, opened up the home library, which was the only library in the neighborhood, to all children in order to instill a love of reading. There are reading rooms, meeting rooms and a computer room in the library. One of the wards is kept in order to preserve the memory of the building.

It is one of the three public libraries in İslahiye district. The others are Altınüzüm and İslahiye Yeşilyurt.

== Documentary ==
The story of the redevelopment project features in a documentary film directed by Vedat Atasoy.
