= Kabaklar, İslahiye =

Village in Gaziantep Province, Turkey

Kabaklar
- Neighbourhood
- Location in Turkey
- Coordinates: 37°2′4″N 36°34′4″E
- Country: Turkey
- Province: Gaziantep
- District: İslahiye
- Population (2022): 226
- Time zone: UTC+3 (TRT)

Kabaklar is a neighbourhood in the municipality and district of İslahiye, Gaziantep Province, Turkey. Its population is 226 (2022). The village is inhabited by Tahtacı, a subgroup of Alevi Turkomans, who belong to the Hacı Emirli ocak.
