= Güngören, İslahiye =

Village in Gaziantep Province, Turkey

Güngören
- Neighbourhood
- Location in Turkey
- Coordinates: 36°55′52″N 36°47′58″E
- Country: Turkey
- Province: Gaziantep
- District: İslahiye
- Population (2022): 288
- Time zone: UTC+3 (TRT)

Güngören is a neighbourhood in the municipality and district of İslahiye, Gaziantep Province, Turkey. Its population is 288 (2022).
