= Örtülü, İslahiye =

Village in Gaziantep Province, Turkey

Örtülü
- Neighbourhood
- Location in Turkey
- Coordinates: 37°3′20″N 36°43′6″E
- Country: Turkey
- Province: Gaziantep
- District: İslahiye
- Population (2022): 198
- Time zone: UTC+3 (TRT)

Örtülü is a neighbourhood in the municipality and district of İslahiye, Gaziantep Province, Turkey. The village is populated by Kurds and had a population of 198 in 2022.
