= Kale, İslahiye =

Village in Gaziantep Province, Turkey

Kale
- Neighbourhood
- Location in Turkey
- Coordinates: 36°54′24″N 36°52′10″E
- Country: Turkey
- Province: Gaziantep
- District: İslahiye
- Population (2022): 293
- Time zone: UTC+3 (TRT)

Kale is a neighbourhood in the municipality and district of İslahiye, Gaziantep Province, Turkey. Its population is 293 (2022).
