= Zincirli, İslahiye =

Village in Gaziantep Province, Turkey

Zincirli
- Neighbourhood
- Location in Turkey
- Coordinates: 37°6′19″N 36°40′30″E
- Country: Turkey
- Province: Gaziantep
- District: İslahiye
- Population (2022): 181
- Time zone: UTC+3 (TRT)

Zincirli is a neighbourhood in the municipality and district of İslahiye, Gaziantep Province, Turkey. The village is populated by Kurds of the Çelikan tribe and had a population of 181 in 2022.
