= Çubuk, İslahiye =

Village in Gaziantep Province, Turkey

Çubuk
- Neighbourhood
- Location in Turkey
- Coordinates: 36°59′43″N 36°47′11″E
- Country: Turkey
- Province: Gaziantep
- District: İslahiye
- Population (2022): 191
- Time zone: UTC+3 (TRT)

Çubuk is a neighbourhood in the municipality and district of İslahiye, Gaziantep Province, Turkey. The village is populated by Kurds and had a population of 191 in 2022.
