= Telli, İslahiye =

Village in Gaziantep Province, Turkey

Telli
- Neighbourhood
- Location in Turkey
- Coordinates: 37°1′45″N 36°36′23″E
- Country: Turkey
- Province: Gaziantep
- District: İslahiye
- Population (2022): 162
- Time zone: UTC+3 (TRT)

Telli is a neighbourhood in the municipality and district of İslahiye, Gaziantep Province, Turkey. Its population is 162 (2022).
