= Alaca, İslahiye =

Village in Gaziantep Province, Turkey

Alaca
- Neighbourhood
- Location in Turkey
- Coordinates: 36°59′21″N 36°49′55″E
- Country: Turkey
- Province: Gaziantep
- District: İslahiye
- Population (2022): 207
- Time zone: UTC+3 (TRT)

Alaca is a neighbourhood in the municipality and district of İslahiye, Gaziantep Province, Turkey. Its population is 207 (2022).
