= Hanağzı, İslahiye =

Village in Gaziantep Province, Turkey

Hanağzı
- Neighbourhood
- Location in Turkey
- Coordinates: 37°3′43″N 36°36′53″E
- Country: Turkey
- Province: Gaziantep
- District: İslahiye
- Population (2022): 161
- Time zone: UTC+3 (TRT)

Hanağzı is a neighbourhood in the municipality and district of İslahiye, Gaziantep Province, Turkey. Its population is 161 (2022). The village is populated by Kurds.
