= Yeşilova, İslahiye =

Village in Gaziantep Province, Turkey

Yeşilova
- Neighbourhood
- Location in Turkey
- Coordinates: 36°59′54″N 36°44′52″E
- Country: Turkey
- Province: Gaziantep
- District: İslahiye
- Population (2022): 164
- Time zone: UTC+3 (TRT)

Yeşilova is a neighbourhood in the municipality and district of İslahiye, Gaziantep Province, Turkey. The village had a population of 164 in 2022.
