= Arii =

Arii/Ari/Arai/Arain may refer to:

- Arii, a Latinized form of Greek Αρειοί ("Ar(e)ioi"), an adherent of the Arian branch of Christianity
- Arii, the inhabitants of Aria (region), a north eastern Satrapy of the Achaemenid Empire
- Arii, according to Herodotus the original name of the Medes
- Ari'i or Ariki, Polynesian nobility
- Another name for Harii, a Germanic tribe of the 1st century
