= Altınüzüm =

Town in Gaziantep Province, Turkey

- Neighbourhood
- Location in Turkey
- Coordinates: 36°56′4″N 36°34′17″E
- Country: Turkey
- Province: Gaziantep
- District: İslahiye
- Population (2022): 2,391
- Time zone: UTC+3 (TRT)
- Area code: 0342

Altınüzüm (Kurdish: Haltan) is a neighbourhood of the municipality and district of İslahiye, Gaziantep Province, Turkey. Its population is 2,391 (2022). Before the 2013 reorganisation, it was a town (belde). It is populated by Kurds.
