= Elbistanhüyüğü, İslahiye =

Village in Gaziantep Province, Turkey

Elbistanhüyüğü
- Neighbourhood
- Location in Turkey
- Coordinates: 37°5′4″N 36°44′24″E
- Country: Turkey
- Province: Gaziantep
- District: İslahiye
- Population (2022): 166
- Time zone: UTC+3 (TRT)

Elbistanhüyüğü is a neighbourhood in the municipality and district of İslahiye, Gaziantep Province, Turkey. Its population is 166 (2022).
