= Çerçili, İslahiye =

Village in Gaziantep Province, Turkey

Çerçili
- Neighbourhood
- Location in Turkey
- Coordinates: 37°2′10″N 36°35′37″E
- Country: Turkey
- Province: Gaziantep
- District: İslahiye
- Population (2022): 295
- Time zone: UTC+3 (TRT)

Çerçili is a neighbourhood in the municipality and district of İslahiye, Gaziantep Province, Turkey. Its population is 295 (2022). The village is inhabited by Tahtacı, a subgroup of Alevi Turkomans, who belong to the Hacı Emirli ocak. The türbe of the founder of this ocak, İbrahim Sani, is located in Çerçili.

The village was known as Tut Alanı (lit. 'mulberry field') in the 16th century and was inhabited by dervishes of İbrahim Baba and Ayrums.
