= Esenler, İslahiye =

Village in Gaziantep Province, Turkey

Esenler
- Neighbourhood
- Location in Turkey
- Coordinates: 36°52′58″N 36°32′25″E
- Country: Turkey
- Province: Gaziantep
- District: İslahiye
- Population (2022): 344
- Time zone: UTC+3 (TRT)

Esenler is a neighbourhood in the municipality and district of İslahiye, Gaziantep Province, Turkey. Its population is 344 (2022).
