= İdilli, İslahiye =

Village in Gaziantep Province, Turkey

İdilli
- Neighbourhood
- Location in Turkey
- Coordinates: 36°58′58″N 36°33′40″E
- Country: Turkey
- Province: Gaziantep
- District: İslahiye
- Population (2022): 347
- Time zone: UTC+3 (TRT)

İdilli is a neighbourhood in the municipality and district of İslahiye, Gaziantep Province, Turkey. Its population is 347 (2022).
