= Yağızlar, İslahiye =

Village in Gaziantep Province, Turkey

Yağızlar
- Neighbourhood
- Location in Turkey
- Coordinates: 36°56′31″N 36°30′25″E
- Country: Turkey
- Province: Gaziantep
- District: İslahiye
- Population (2022): 421
- Time zone: UTC+3 (TRT)

Yağızlar is a neighbourhood in the municipality and district of İslahiye, Gaziantep Province, Turkey. Its population is 421 (2022).
