= Yesemek, İslahiye =

Village in Gaziantep Province, Turkey

Yesemek
- Neighbourhood
- Location in Turkey
- Coordinates: 36°54′15″N 36°44′35″E
- Country: Turkey
- Province: Gaziantep
- District: İslahiye
- Population (2022): 422
- Time zone: UTC+3 (TRT)

Yesemek is a neighbourhood in the municipality and district of İslahiye, Gaziantep Province, Turkey. Its population is 422 (2022). The village is inhabited by Kurds of the Delikan tribe.
