= Sulumağara, İslahiye =

Village in Gaziantep Province, Turkey

Sulumağara
- Neighbourhood
- Location in Turkey
- Coordinates: 36°55′39″N 36°34′3″E
- Country: Turkey
- Province: Gaziantep
- District: İslahiye
- Population (2022): 2,586
- Time zone: UTC+3 (TRT)

Sulumağara is a neighbourhood in the municipality and district of İslahiye, Gaziantep Province, Turkey. Its population is 2,586 (2022). The village is populated by Kurds.
