= Kazıklı, İslahiye =

Village in Gaziantep Province, Turkey

Kazıklı
- Neighbourhood
- Location in Turkey
- Coordinates: 36°50′25″N 36°42′4″E
- Country: Turkey
- Province: Gaziantep
- District: İslahiye
- Population (2022): 736
- Time zone: UTC+3 (TRT)

Kazıklı is a neighbourhood in the municipality and district of İslahiye, Gaziantep Province, Turkey. Its population is 736 (2022). The village is inhabited by Kurds of the Delikan tribe.
