= Güllühüyük, İslahiye =

Village in Gaziantep Province, Turkey

Güllühüyük
- Neighbourhood
- Location in Turkey
- Coordinates: 37°0′14″N 36°41′13″E
- Country: Turkey
- Province: Gaziantep
- District: İslahiye
- Population (2022): 277
- Time zone: UTC+3 (TRT)

Güllühüyük is a neighbourhood in the municipality and district of İslahiye, Gaziantep Province, Turkey. Its population is 277 (2022). The village is inhabited by Kurds.
