= Karakaya, İslahiye =

Village in Gaziantep Province, Turkey

Karakaya
- Neighbourhood
- Location in Turkey
- Coordinates: 36°57′44″N 36°46′44″E
- Country: Turkey
- Province: Gaziantep
- District: İslahiye
- Population (2022): 227
- Time zone: UTC+3 (TRT)

Karakaya is a neighbourhood in the municipality and district of İslahiye, Gaziantep Province, Turkey. Its population is 227 (2022). The village is populated by Kurds.
