= Koçcağız, İslahiye =

Village in Gaziantep Province, Turkey

Koçcağız
- Neighbourhood
- Location in Turkey
- Coordinates: 37°0′18″N 36°33′43″E
- Country: Turkey
- Province: Gaziantep
- District: İslahiye
- Population (2022): 145
- Time zone: UTC+3 (TRT)

Koçcağız is a neighbourhood in the municipality and district of İslahiye, Gaziantep Province, Turkey. Its population is 145 (2022).
