= Boğaziçi, İslahiye =

Village in Gaziantep Province, Turkey

Boğaziçi
- Neighbourhood
- Location in Turkey
- Coordinates: 36°55′58″N 36°34′36″E
- Country: Turkey
- Province: Gaziantep
- District: İslahiye
- Population (2022): 3,118
- Time zone: UTC+3 (TRT)

Boğaziçi, historically Kerküt, is a neighbourhood of the municipality and district of İslahiye, Gaziantep Province, Turkey. Its population is 3,118 (2022). Before the 2013 reorganisation, it was a town (belde). It is populated by Turks.
