= Karacaören, İslahiye =

Village in Gaziantep Province, Turkey

Karacaören
- Neighbourhood
- Location in Turkey
- Coordinates: 36°57′30″N 36°54′21″E
- Country: Turkey
- Province: Gaziantep
- District: İslahiye
- Population (2022): 343
- Time zone: UTC+3 (TRT)

Karacaören is a neighbourhood in the municipality and district of İslahiye, Gaziantep Province, Turkey. Its population is 343 (2022). It is populated by Kurds.
