= Yeniceli, İslahiye =

Village in Gaziantep Province, Turkey

Yeniceli
- Neighbourhood
- Location in Turkey
- Coordinates: 36°58′44″N 36°55′21″E
- Country: Turkey
- Province: Gaziantep
- District: İslahiye
- Population (2022): 443
- Time zone: UTC+3 (TRT)

Yeniceli is a neighbourhood in the municipality and district of İslahiye, Gaziantep Province, Turkey. Its population is 443 (2022).
