= Kuşçumustafa, İslahiye =

Village in Gaziantep Province, Turkey

Kuşçumustafa
- Neighbourhood
- Location in Turkey
- Coordinates: 37°6′0″N 36°37′1″E
- Country: Turkey
- Province: Gaziantep
- District: İslahiye
- Population (2022): 64
- Time zone: UTC+3 (TRT)

Kuşçumustafa is a neighbourhood in the municipality and district of İslahiye, Gaziantep Province, Turkey. Its population is 64 (2022).
