= Burunsuzlar, İslahiye =

Village in Gaziantep Province, Turkey

Burunsuzlar
- Neighbourhood
- Location in Turkey
- Coordinates: 36°56′37″N 36°51′47″E
- Country: Turkey
- Province: Gaziantep
- District: İslahiye
- Population (2022): 381
- Time zone: UTC+3 (TRT)

Burunsuzlar is a neighbourhood in the municipality and district of İslahiye, Gaziantep Province, Turkey. Its population is 381 (2022).
