= Çolaklar, İslahiye =

Village in Gaziantep Province, Turkey

Çolaklar
- Neighbourhood
- Location in Turkey
- Coordinates: 36°58′30″N 36°40′37″E
- Country: Turkey
- Province: Gaziantep
- District: İslahiye
- Population (2022): 153
- Time zone: UTC+3 (TRT)

Çolaklar is a neighbourhood in the municipality and district of İslahiye, Gaziantep Province, Turkey. The village is inhabited by Kurds of the Delikan tribe and had a population of 153 in 2022.
