= Türkbahçe, İslahiye =

Village in Gaziantep Province, Turkey

Türkbahçe
- Neighbourhood
- Location in Turkey
- Coordinates: 37°4′21″N 36°37′13″E
- Country: Turkey
- Province: Gaziantep
- District: İslahiye
- Population (2022): 516
- Time zone: UTC+3 (TRT)

Türkbahçe is a neighbourhood in the municipality and district of İslahiye, Gaziantep Province, Turkey. Its population is 516 (2022).
