= Karapolat, İslahiye =

Village in Gaziantep Province, Turkey

Karapolat
- Neighbourhood
- Location in Turkey
- Coordinates: 37°0′13″N 36°42′30″E
- Country: Turkey
- Province: Gaziantep
- District: İslahiye
- Population (2022): 171
- Time zone: UTC+3 (TRT)

Karapolat is a neighbourhood in the municipality and district of İslahiye, Gaziantep Province, Turkey. Its population is 171 (2022).
