= Şahmaran, İslahiye =

Village in Gaziantep Province, Turkey

Şahmaran
- Neighbourhood
- Location in Turkey
- Coordinates: 36°58′4″N 36°43′9″E
- Country: Turkey
- Province: Gaziantep
- District: İslahiye
- Population (2022): 356
- Time zone: UTC+3 (TRT)

Şahmaran is a neighbourhood in the municipality and district of İslahiye, Gaziantep Province, Turkey. The village had a population of 356 in 2022.
