= Seleucia ad Belum =

Ancient Greek and Roman city on the Orontes River

Seleucia (Ancient Greek: Σελεύκεια, Seleukeia), distinguished as Seleucia-near-Belus (Ancient Greek: Σελεύκεια πρὸς Βήλῳ, Seleúkeia pròs Bḗlōi, or πρὸς τῷ Βήλῳ, pròs tôi Bḗlōi; Latin: Seleucia ad Belum or juxta Belum) and later known as Seleucobelus (Σελευκόβηλος, Seleukóbēlos) or Seleucopolis, was an ancient Greek and Roman city on the Orontes River. Its location remains uncertain.

== Name ==
The name of the settlement honored Seleucus I Nicator, one of the Diadochi successors to the empire of Alexander the Great, although it may have been a foundation by his son and successor Antiochus. It was distinguished from other cities named Seleucia by reference to "Belus" or "the Belus", a toponym which was variously applied to Syria's Limestone Massif, which lies to the city's north, and to various rivers in Syria. In this case, it appears that the name Belus was a title of the Orontes.

== History ==
The city was a Hellenistic foundation of the Seleucid Empire. It sat on the Orontes's west bank near its headwaters, positioning it to function as a depot for overland trade in the area. During the heyday of the Seleucid Empire, it formed a suburb of the nearby and larger settlement Apamea (originally Pella), which Ptolemy placed ½° to its east. The entire area held over half a million people.

After the 2nd century, it typically appeared under the name Seleucobelus.

The precise location of the settlement remains uncertain, with various scholars placing it near Al-Suqaylabiyah, Jisr al-Shughur or Bara.

== See also ==
- Other Seleucias
- Chalcis ad Belum, another Syrian city on a different river Belus
