= Hasanlök, İslahiye =

Village in Gaziantep Province, Turkey

Hasanlök
- Neighbourhood
- Location in Turkey
- Coordinates: 36°54′30″N 36°30′37″E
- Country: Turkey
- Province: Gaziantep
- District: İslahiye
- Population (2022): 552
- Time zone: UTC+3 (TRT)

Hasanlök is a neighbourhood in the municipality and district of İslahiye, Gaziantep Province, Turkey. Its population is 552 (2022).
