= Çınarlı, İslahiye =

Village in Gaziantep Province, Turkey

Çınarlı
- Neighbourhood
- Location in Turkey
- Coordinates: 36°56′38″N 36°48′12″E
- Country: Turkey
- Province: Gaziantep
- District: İslahiye
- Population (2022): 91
- Time zone: UTC+3 (TRT)

Çınarlı is a neighbourhood in the municipality and district of İslahiye, Gaziantep Province, Turkey. Its population is 91 (2022).
