= Yeniköy, İslahiye =

Village in Gaziantep Province, Turkey

Yeniköy
- Neighbourhood
- Location in Turkey
- Coordinates: 36°59′4″N 36°38′56″E
- Country: Turkey
- Province: Gaziantep
- District: İslahiye
- Population (2022): 172
- Time zone: UTC+3 (TRT)

Yeniköy is a neighbourhood in the municipality and district of İslahiye, Gaziantep Province, Turkey. Its population is 172 (2022).
