= Değirmencik, İslahiye =

Village in Gaziantep Province, Turkey

Değirmencik
- Neighbourhood
- Location in Turkey
- Coordinates: 37°0′6″N 36°36′53″E
- Country: Turkey
- Province: Gaziantep
- District: İslahiye
- Population (2022): 598
- Time zone: UTC+3 (TRT)

Değirmencik is a neighbourhood in the municipality and district of İslahiye, Gaziantep Province, Turkey. Its population is 598 (2022). The village is populated by Kurds.
