= Kırıkçalı, İslahiye =

Village in Gaziantep Province, Turkey

Kırıkçalı
- Neighbourhood
- Location in Turkey
- Coordinates: 36°59′39″N 36°37′13″E
- Country: Turkey
- Province: Gaziantep
- District: İslahiye
- Population (2022): 363
- Time zone: UTC+3 (TRT)

Kırıkçalı is a neighbourhood in the municipality and district of İslahiye, Gaziantep Province, Turkey. Its population is 363 (2022). The village is populated by Kurds.
