= Nicopolis (Cilicia) =

Inland town in the extreme east of ancient Cilicia

Coordinates: 37°01′38″N 36°38′00″E

Nicopolis or Nikopolis (Ancient Greek: Νικόπολις, "city of victory") was an inland town in the extreme east of ancient Cilicia, inhabited during Hellenistic, Roman, and Byzantine times. It was founded near the site of the Battle of Issus, and is mentioned by numerous ancient writers.

Its site is located near İslahiye in Asiatic Turkey.
