= İslahiye =

- District and municipality
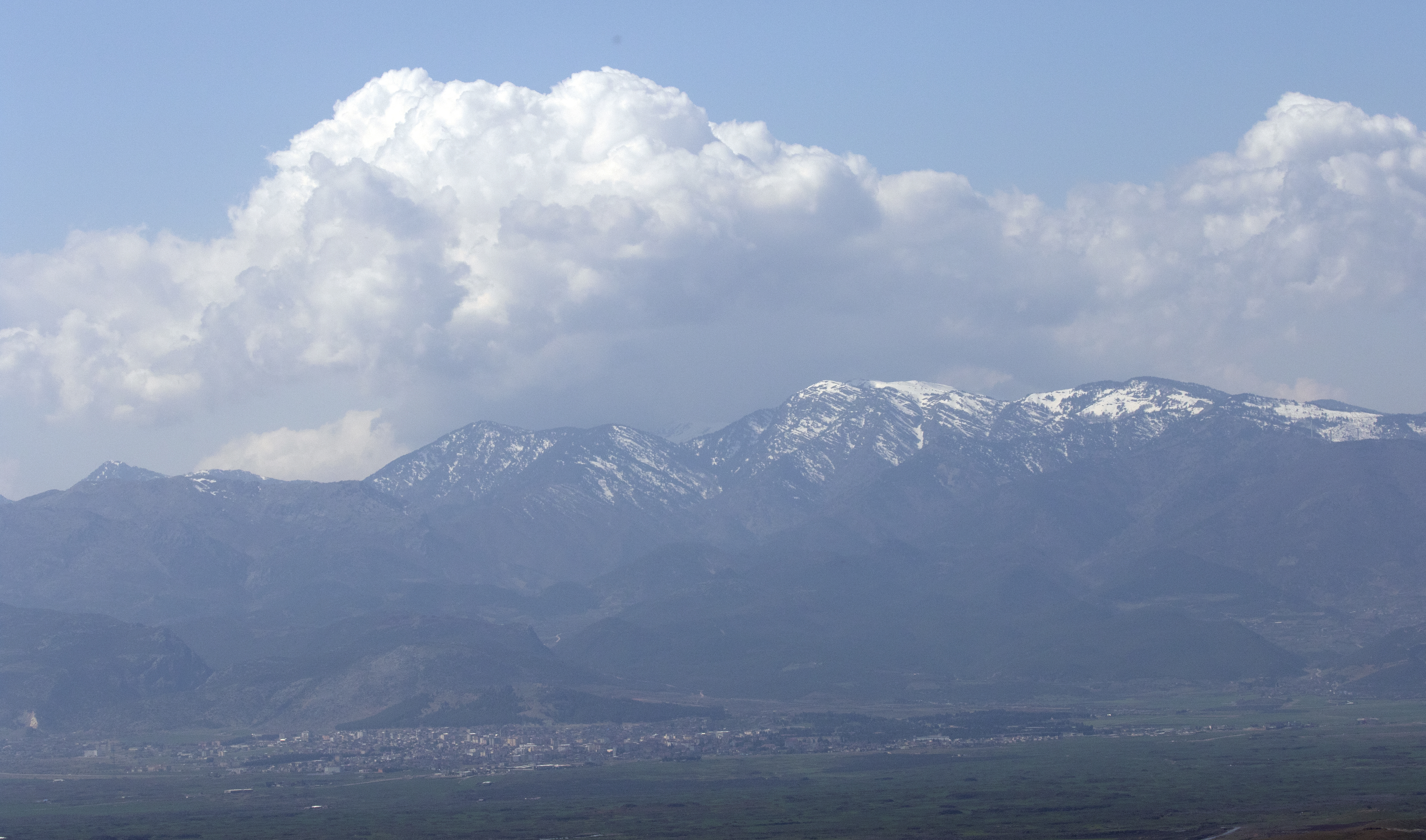
- Amanos Mountains, İslahiye

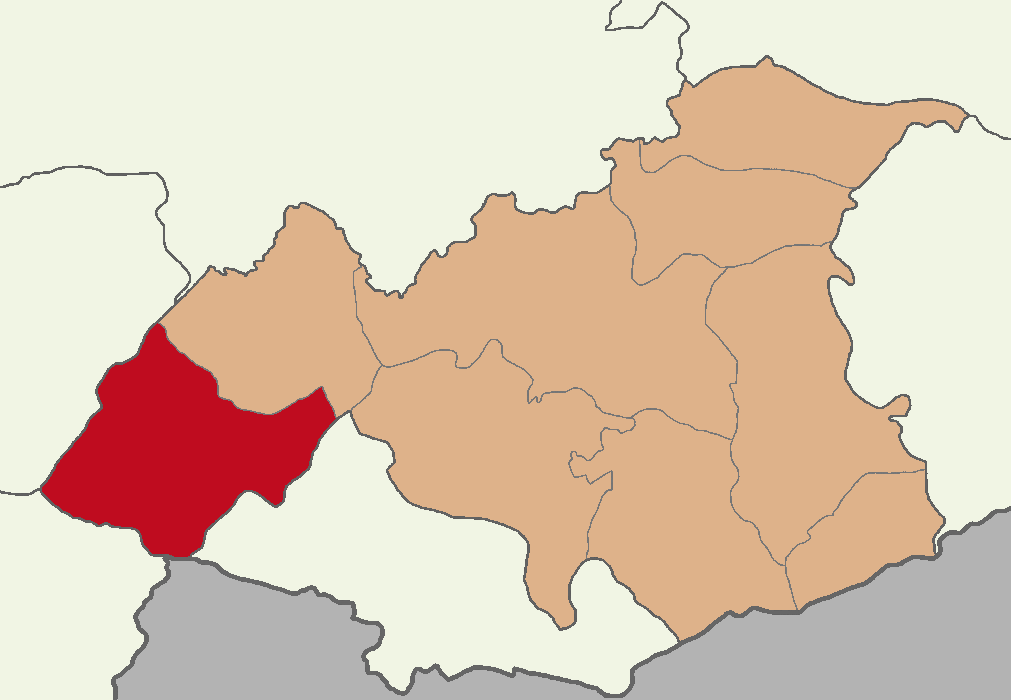
- Map showing İslahiye District in Gaziantep Province

- Location within Turkey
- Coordinates: 37°01′30″N 36°38′04.20″E
- Country: Turkey
- Province: Gaziantep

Government
  - Mayor: Kemal Vural (AKP)
- Area: 865 km^{2} (334 sq mi)
- Population (2022): 67,650
  - Density: 78.2/km^{2} (203/sq mi)
- Time zone: UTC+3 (TRT)
- Postal code: 27800
- Area code: 0342
- Website: www.islahiye.bel.tr

İslahiye is a municipality and district of Gaziantep Province, Turkey. Its area is 865 km^{2}, and its population is 67,650 (2022). It is a railway border crossing into Syria. Near İslahiye is the site of ancient Nicopolis.

The railway station of Islahiye is the last stop on the railway to Damascus in Syria. Since March 2001, a regular train line runs once a week between Syria and Iran via Islahiye. The state road D.825, which connects Gaziantep with Antakya, runs through İslahiye.

The town is inhabited by Yörüks of the Aydınlı tribe. English traveler Mark Sykes recorded İslahiye as a town inhabited by Turkmen in the early 20th century.

A magnitude 7.8 earthquake struck İslahiye on 6 February 2023, causing widespread devastation in the town and many deaths.

== Composition ==
There are 71 neighbourhoods in İslahiye District:

- Ağabey
- Ağalarobası
- Akınyolu
- Alaca
- Altınüzüm
- Arpalı
- Atatürk
- Aydınlık
- Bahçelievler
- Bayraktepe
- Beyler
- Boğaziçi
- Burhaniye
- Burunsuzlar
- Çamlıca
- Çerçili
- Cevdetpaşa
- Çınarlı
- Çolaklar
- Çubuk
- Cumhuriyet
- Değirmencik
- Dervişpaşa
- Elbistanhüyüğü
- Erenler
- Esenler
- Fevziçakmak
- Fevzipaşa
- Göltepe
- Güllühüyük
- Güngören
- Hacı Ali Öztürk
- Hanağzı
- Hasanlök
- Hürriyet
- İdilli
- Kabaklar
- Kalaycık
- Kale
- Karacaören
- Karakaya
- Karapınar
- Karapolat
- Kayabaşı
- Kazıklı
- Kırıkçalı
- Koçcağız
- Köklü
- Kozdere
- Kuşçumustafa
- Ortaklı
- Örtülü
- Pınarbaşı
- Şahmaran
- Şerikanlı
- Serinevler
- Sulumağara
- Tandır
- Telli
- Türkbahçe
- Yağızlar
- Yelliburun
- Yeni
- Yeniceli
- Yeniköy
- Yesemek
- Yeşilova
- Yeşilyurt
- Yolbaşı
- Yukarıbilenler
- Zincirli

== Climate ==
İslahiye has a hot-summer Mediterranean climate (Köppen: Csa), with very hot, dry summers, and cool, wet winters.

Climate data for İslahiye (1991–2020)
Month	Jan	Feb	Mar	Apr	May	Jun	Jul	Aug	Sep	Oct	Nov	Dec	Year
Mean daily maximum °C (°F)	9.9 (49.8)	12.0 (53.6)	16.5 (61.7)	22.1 (71.8)	28.2 (82.8)	33.4 (92.1)	36.8 (98.2)	37.1 (98.8)	33.4 (92.1)	26.9 (80.4)	18.0 (64.4)	11.6 (52.9)	23.9 (75.0)
Daily mean °C (°F)	5.5 (41.9)	6.7 (44.1)	10.7 (51.3)	15.2 (59.4)	20.6 (69.1)	25.7 (78.3)	28.9 (84.0)	28.9 (84.0)	25.2 (77.4)	19.3 (66.7)	11.7 (53.1)	7.1 (44.8)	17.2 (63.0)
Mean daily minimum °C (°F)	1.4 (34.5)	2.0 (35.6)	5.3 (41.5)	8.7 (47.7)	13.2 (55.8)	17.6 (63.7)	20.7 (69.3)	21.1 (70.0)	17.7 (63.9)	12.8 (55.0)	6.4 (43.5)	3.1 (37.6)	10.9 (51.6)
Average precipitation mm (inches)	139.5 (5.49)	136.04 (5.36)	111.36 (4.38)	67.66 (2.66)	33.19 (1.31)	7.94 (0.31)	1.27 (0.05)	0.99 (0.04)	16.19 (0.64)	49.43 (1.95)	87.86 (3.46)	148.67 (5.85)	800.1 (31.50)
Source: NOAA

== See also ==
- İslahiye District Public Library
