= Seleucia Sidera =

Ancient settlement in Atabey, Isparta, Turkey

- Location within Turkey
- 37.9°N 30.6179°E
- Type: Settlement
- Cultures: Seleucid, Roman, Byzantine, Turkish
- Location: Isparta Province, Turkey
- Region: Pisidia

Site notes
- Condition: In ruins

Seleucia Sidera (Ancient Greek: Σελεύκεια η Σιδηρᾶ, Seleukeia hê Sidêra; Latin: Seleucia Ferrea), also transliterated as Seleuceia, Seleukeia, and later known as Claudioseleucia, Greek Klaudioseleukeia, was an ancient city in the northern part of Pisidia, Anatolia, near the village of Bayat (old name Selef), near Atabey, about 15 km north-northeast of Isparta, Isparta Province, in the Mediterranean Region of Turkey.

Founded by Seleucus I Nicator or Antiochus I Soter to protect the military road across northern Pisidia. The city's surname Sidera (hê Sidêra, Ptol. v. 5. § 4; Hierocl. p. 673), is probably derives from iron-works in its vicinity. The city minted its own coins, some of which bear the image of the Asiatic divinity Men, who was worshipped at Antioch.

The city was restored by the Roman emperor Claudius, and the name was changed to Claudioseleucia. This name is retained on the city's coins down to the time of Claudius II, though in Ptolemy, the Synecdemus of Hierocles, and the Notitiae Dignitatum the name is recorded as Seleucia.

The city was Christianized early, its bishop, Eutychius being present at the Council of Nicaea in 325.

The city is in ruins. Remnants of the city wall, a necropolis, and a theater can be found.
