= Kalaycık, İslahiye =

Village in Gaziantep Province, Turkey

Kalaycık
- Neighbourhood
- Location in Turkey
- Coordinates: 36°56′37″N 36°39′10″E
- Country: Turkey
- Province: Gaziantep
- District: İslahiye
- Population (2022): 230
- Time zone: UTC+3 (TRT)

Kalaycık is a neighbourhood in the municipality and district of İslahiye, Gaziantep Province, Turkey Its population is 230 (2022). The village is populated by Kurds.
