= Charax Spasinu =

Ancient Persian gulf port city

- Σπασίνου Χάραξ (Koine Greek)
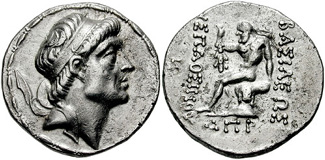
- Hyspaosines (209–124 BC), founder and king of Characene, had his capital in Charax.

- Location within Iraq
- 30°53′41″N 47°34′41″E
- Location: Iraq
- Region: Basra Governorate (location is related to Maysan)

Charax Spasinu, also called Charax Spasinou, Charax Pasinu, Spasinu Charax (Koine Greek: Σπασίνου Χάραξ, romanized: Spasínou Kháraks), Alexandria (Ἀλεξάνδρεια) or Antiochia in Susiana (Ἀντιόχεια τῆς Σουσιανῆς), was an ancient port at the head of the Persian Gulf in what is now Iraq and the capital of the ancient kingdom of Characene.

== Etymology ==
The name Charax, probably from ancient Greek Χάραξ, means "palisaded fort" and was applied to several fortified Seleucid towns. Charax was initially named Alexandria after Alexander the Great, and he perhaps even personally founded it. After destruction by floods, it was rebuilt by Antiochus IV (175-164 BC) and renamed Antiochia. It was at this time provided with a massive antiflood embankment almost 4½ km long by Antiochus's governor, Hyspaosines, and renamed "Charax of Hyspaosines."

There is a theory that Charax derives from the Aramaic word karkā, meaning "a fortification," but Charax is often attested at several other Seleucid towns with the meaning palisade.

== Location of Charax ==
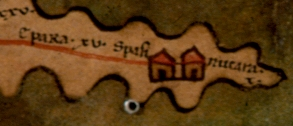
The town of Charax Spa. on the 4th century Peutinger map

Charax was located on a large mound known as Jabal Khuyabir at Naysān near the confluence of the Eulaios/Karkheh and the Tigris as recorded by Pliny the Elder.

According to Pliny:

The town of Charax is situated in the innermost recess of the Persian Gulf, from which projects the country called Arabia Felix. It stands on an artificial elevation between the Tigris on the right and the Karún on the left, at the point where these two rivers unite, and the site measures two [Roman] miles [3 km] in breadth... It was originally at a distance of 1¼ miles [1.9 km] from the coast, and had a harbour of its own, but when Juba [Juba II, c. 50 BC—c. AD 24] published his work it was 50 miles [74 km] inland; its present distance from the coast is stated by Arab envoys and our own traders who have come from the place to be 120 miles [178 km]. There is no part of the world where earth carried down by rivers has encroached on the sea further or more rapidly...

The Description of Pliny matches the depiction on the Tabula Peutingeriana.

The Jabal Khuyabir tell is now 1km south of the confluence of the Eulaios/Karkheh and the Tigris; the river shifted course during a well-documented storm event in 1837.

Naysān could be a colloquial Arabic corruption of Maysān, the name of Characene during the early Islamic era. First excavations and research started in 2016.

== Archaeology ==
Excavations on the site started in 2016, which revealed that the city was laid out on a grid pattern with housing block 185 by 85 m square. These belong to the largest blocks in the ancient world. Two large public buildings were detected, but are not yet excavated.

== History ==
A history of the city of Charax can be distilled only from ancient texts and numismatic sources, as the city itself has never been properly excavated.

The city was established by Alexander the Great in 324 BC, replacing a small Persian settlement, Durine. This was one of Alexander's last cities before he died in 323 BC. Here he established a quarter (dēmē) of the port called Pella, named after Alexander's own town of birth, where he settled Macedonian Greek veterans. The city passed to the Seleucid Empire after Alexander's death, until it was destroyed at some point by flooding.

The city was rebuilt c. 166 BC by order of Antiochus IV, who appointed Hyspaosines as satrap to oversee the work. The political instability that followed the Parthian conquest of most of the Seleucid Empire allowed Hyspaosines to establish an independent state, Characene, in 127 BC. He renamed the city after himself.

Charax remained the capital of the small state for 282 years, with the numismatic evidence suggesting it was a multi-ethnic Hellenised city with extensive trading links. The Romans under Trajan annexed the city in AD 116. Characene independence was re-established 15 years later under the rule of Mithridates, a son of the Parthian King Pacoros, during the civil war for the Parthian throne. The coinage from Charax indicates a more Parthian culture.

In AD 221–222, an ethnic Persian, Ardašēr, who was satrap of Fars, led a revolt against the Parthians, establishing the Sasanian Empire. According to later Arab histories he defeated Characene forces, killed its last ruler, rebuilt the town and renamed it Astarābād-Ardašīr. The area around Charax that had been the Characene state was thereon known by the Aramaic/Syriac name, Maysān, which the Arab conquerors later adapted.

Charax continued, under the name Maysan, with Persian texts mentioning governors through the fifth century and a Church of the East here in the sixth century. The Charax mint appears to have continued through the Sassanid Empire and into the Umayyad empire, minting coin as late as 715.

Charax was finally abandoned during the 9th century due to persistent flooding and a dramatic decrease in trade with the West.

== Economy ==
An Arab chieftain, Spasines, enlarged the original Greek town, and afterward named Spasines and Charax Spasinou after him. It was a major trading center of late antiquity as evidenced by the hoards of Greek coins recovered during excavations there.

Although it was nominally a vassal of the Seleucids and, later, the Arsacids, it seemed to have retained a considerable degree of autonomy at times. It became a centre for Arab trade, primarily controlled by the Nabataeans, at least until they became assimilated by the Romans in AD 106.

Charax was a prosperous port with ships arriving regularly from Gerrha, Egypt, India, and beyond. Trajan observed the ships bound for India during his visit, Strabo called the city an emporium and Pliny notes that the city was a centre of trade for rare perfumes and was also a centre for pearl diving. It was also the beginning of the overland trade route from the Persian Gulf to Petra and Palmyra and also into the Parthian Empire.

== Coins ==
Before the invasion of Trajan Charax minted coins of a Hellenistic type, while after the invasion, the coinage was of a more Parthian character. Charax minted coin through the Sassanid Empire and into the Umayyad Caliphate, minting coin as late as AD 715.

== Notable persons ==
It was visited in AD 97 by the Chinese envoy Gan Ying 甘英, who referred to it as 干羅 (Pinyin: Gànluò; reconstructed ancient pronunciation *ka-ra), who was trying to reach the Roman Empire via Egypt but, after reaching the Persian Gulf was convinced to turn back by the Parthians.

In AD 116, the Roman Emperor Trajan visited Charax Spasinu – his most recent, easternmost, and shortest-lived possession. He saw the many ships setting sail for India, and wished he were younger, like Alexander had been, so that he could go there himself.

Isidore of Charax, a 1st-century geographer, came from Charax Spasinu.

Robert Eisenman contends that it was this city, and not the better-known Antioch in which Paul the Apostle established his first church.

== See also ==
- List of cities founded by Alexander the Great
