= Seleucia-on-the-Hedyphon =

- Σελεύκεια η προς Ηδυφώντι (Greek)
- Location within Iran
- 30°59′14.0″N 49°25′36.2″E
- Location: Iran
- Region: Khuzestan province

Seleucia-on-the-Hedyphon (Greek: Σελεύκεια η προς Ηδυφώντι, also transliterated as Seleuceia, Seleukeia; formerly Soloke or Soloce, Sodome, and Sele, also Surak) was an ancient city on the Hedyphon (now called the Jarahi River) in Susa (earlier Elam), east of Mesopotamia, currently the site of Ja Nishin, Khuzestan province, Iran.
