= Naysān (Iraq) =

Archaeological site in Basrah, Iraq

Naysān (also known as Jabal Khayabar and Naisān) is a tell and an archaeological site in Basrah, southern Iraq.

== Identification ==
The site has been identified as the ruins of Charax Spasinu, once capital of the Messene Kingdom.

This claim is based on the scale of the ruins, the fact that the local name for the ruins is Naysān which is probably a corruption of the Parthian name for Mesene, Maysān, (from which Maysan Governorate also derives its name.) The location of the ruins is at the confluence of the Tigris and Karkheh Rivers, as stated of Charax Spasinu, by Pliny the Elder.

== Archaeology ==
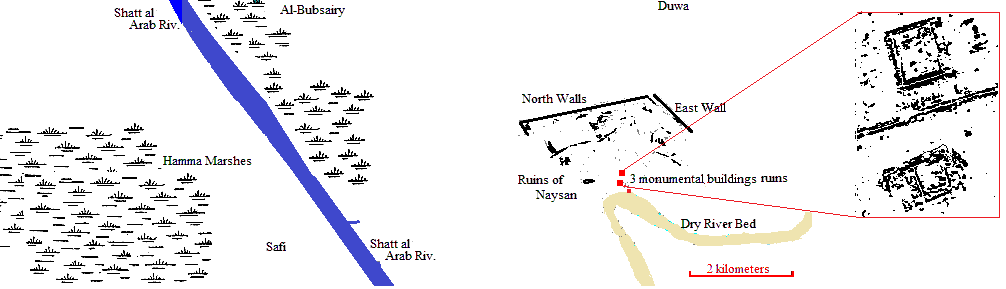
Plan of the Archaeological Site of Naysan, on the Shat Al Arab in southern Iraq following preliminary geophysical survey of the site in 2016. Naysan represents the ruins of Alexandria Charax, founded by Alexander the great and which became the Capital of the Characene State during late antiquity.

The tell was not excavated before 2016, due to ongoing conflict and instability in the area, however, a preliminary survey was conducted in 1965. That survey identified a series of impressive bastion walls of baked brick and significant pottery shards on the surface. The shards that could be identified belonged to the Sasanian or early Islamic periods That preliminary survey in 1965 found the site was a town of trapezoidal shape, approximately 1.5 by 3 kilometres (0.93 mi × 1.86 mi).

The 2016 excavations found the city was laid out on a grid pattern with housing block 185 by 85m, and numerous late antiquity coins.

The report for the 2016 excavation and geophys survey reported that:

"The brick and earth ramparts that form the city limits of Charax still survive up to four metres high and are the dominant feature in the otherwise flat landscape. The northern rampart, 2.4km long, is the best preserved. Stretches of the eastern and western ramparts still survive, but the southern one is no longer visible. The limit of the city to the south is defined by a looping ancient bed of the Karun River"

Artifacts found include beads, column remnants, glassware, pottery, and coins of Hellenistic Seleucid kings and (possibly) Parthian as well.
