= Artacoana =

Artacoana (Ancient Greek: Ἀρτακόανα) or Artacana or Articaudna (Ἀρτίκαυδνα) or Chortacana or Artacaena, name of the capital of Aria, an eastern satrapy of the Persian empire.

In late 330 B.C. Alexander the Great, according to his biographers, captured Artacoana, the Areian capital. Later, a new capital was built, either by Alexander himself or by his successors, Alexandria Ariana (Ἀλεξάνδρεια ἡ ἐν Ἀρίοις), modern Herat in northwest Afghanistan. Ptolemy lists several other cities, an indication of the province's wealth and fertility. The most important, according to Ptolemy were:

- Dista
- Nabaris
- Taua
- Augara
- Bitaxa
- Sarmagana
- Sipharê
- Rhagaura
- Zamuchana
- Ambrodax
- Bogadia
- Varpna
- Godana
- Phoraga
- Chatrisachê
- Chauvrina
- Orthiana
- Taupana
- Astanda
- Articaudna
- Alexandria in Aria
- Babarsana
- Caputana
- Susia
- Aria civitas
- Basica
- Sotira
- Orbetanê
- Nisibis
- Paracanacê
- Gariga
- Darcama
- Cotacê
- Tribasina
- Astasana
- Zimyra

The etymology of this name remains unknown, and whether this place should be identified with the modern city of Herat is also uncertain, although the strategic position of modern Herat would suggest its great antiquity; and thus the possibility remains that they are one and the same place. In the early nineteenth century a Persian Achaemenid cuneiform cylinder seal was found in or near Herat.

== See also ==
- Aria
- Herat
