= Wahbarz =

Dynast of Persis in the 2nd century BCE

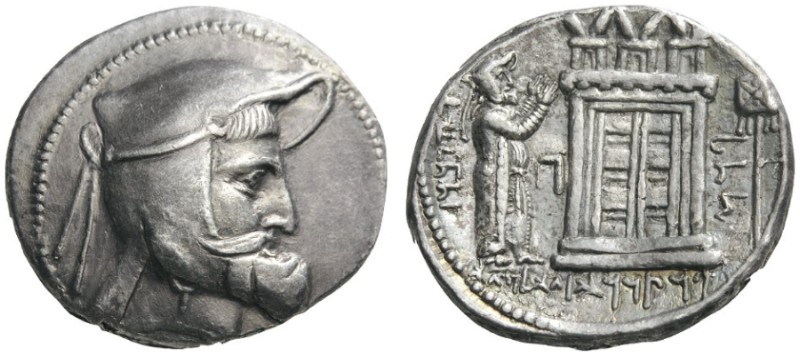
- Wahbarz's portrait on the obverse of a coin. The headgear is a combination of a satrapal tiara, and the Hellenistic diadem of a ruler. The reverse shows him praying in front of a fire temple.

Frataraka of Persis
- Reign: c. 205(?) – 164 BC
- Predecessor: Ardakhshir I
- Successor: Baydad
- Died: 164 BC
- Religion: Zoroastrianism

Wahbarz (also spelled Vahbarz), known in Greek sources as Oborzos, was a dynast (frataraka) of Persis in the 1st half of the 2nd century BC, ruling from possibly c. 205 to 164 BC. His reign was marked by his efforts to establish Persis as a kingdom independent from Seleucid authority. He was able to reign independently for three decades, and even expanded to the west, seizing the Seleucid province of Characene. In 164 BC, the Seleucids repelled Wahbarz's forces from Characene, forcing him to re-submit as a Seleucid vassal. He was succeeded by Baydad.

== Background ==
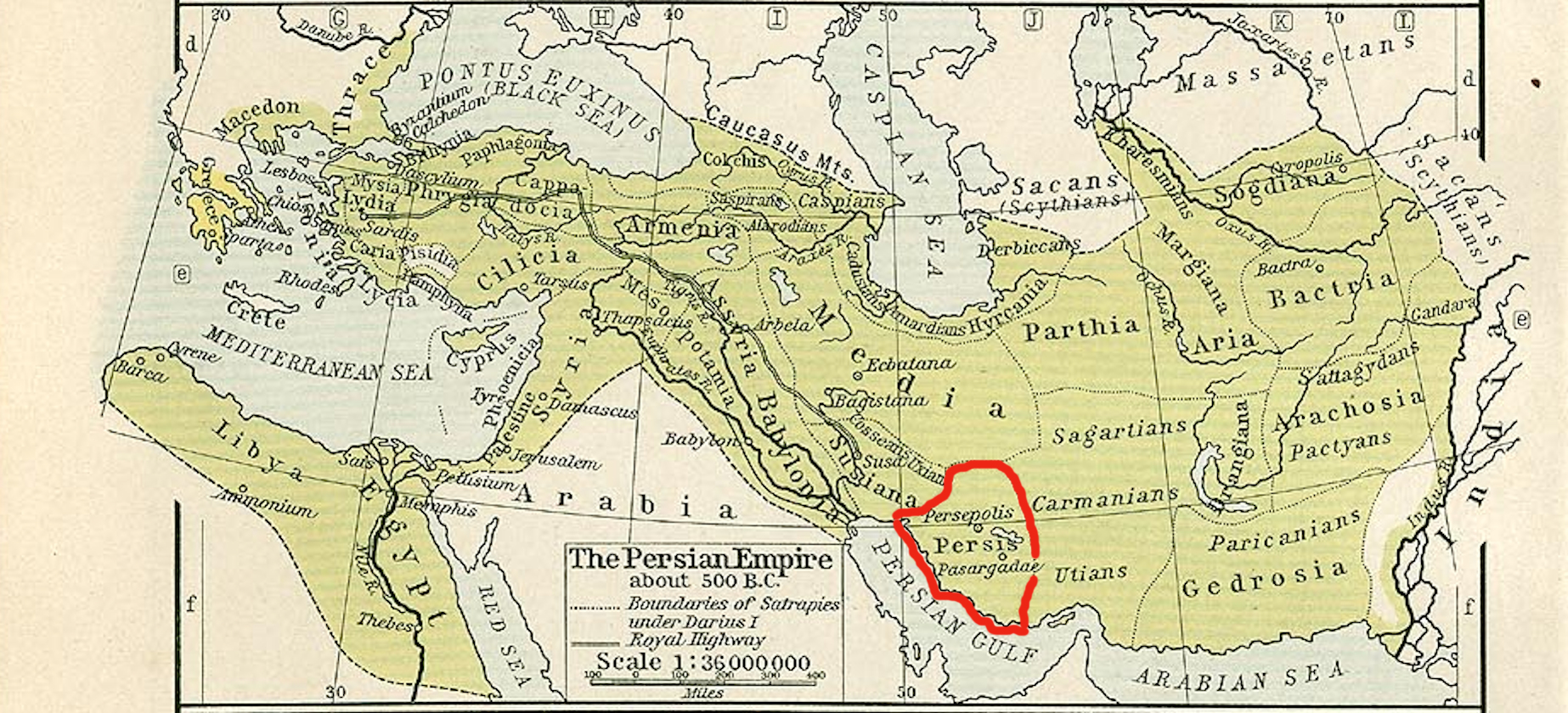
Location of Persis under the Achaemenid Empire.

Since the end of the 3rd or the beginning of the 2nd century BCE, Persis had been ruled by local dynasts subject to the Seleucid Empire. They held the ancient Persian title of frataraka ("leader, governor, forerunner"), which is also attested in the Achaemenid-era. The Achaemenid Empire, which had a century earlier ruled most of the Near East, originated from the region. The frataraka themselves emphasized their close affiliation with the prominent Achaemenid king of kings, and their court was probably at the former Achaemenid capital of Persepolis, where they financed construction projects on and near the Achaemenid plateau. The frataraka had traditionally been regarded as priestly dynasts or advocates of religious (and political) opposition to Hellenism, however, this is no longer considered the case.

== Chronology of the frataraka ==
The traditional view of the chronology of the frataraka dynasts was originally; Baydad, Ardakhshir I, Wahbarz, Wadfradad I and Wadfradad II. However, recent findings of Persis coins have led to more a likely chronology; Ardakhshir I, Wahbarz, Wadfradad I, Baydad and Wadfradad II.

== Reign ==
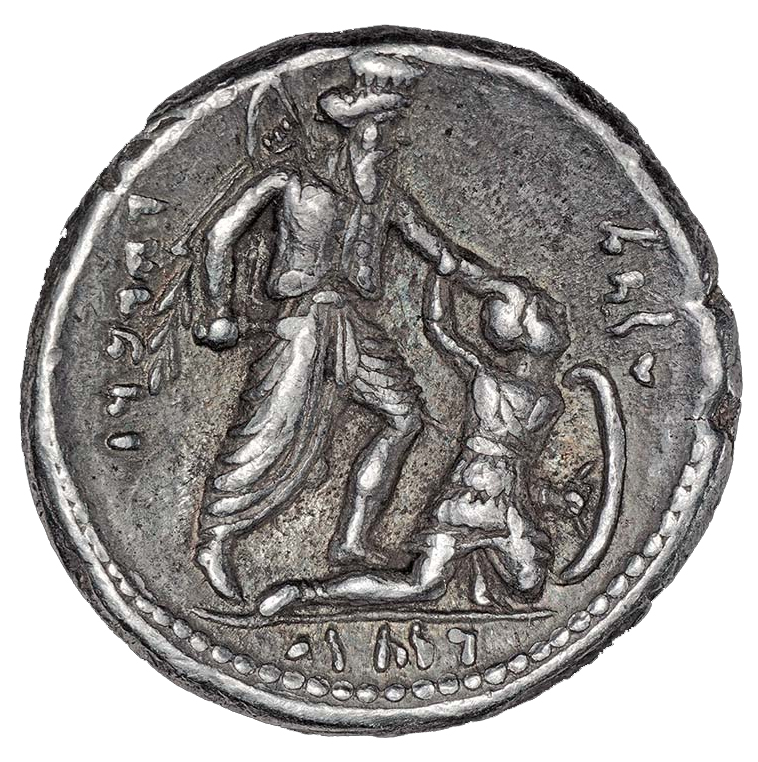
Drachm of Vahbarz/Oborzos, showing on the reverse the king in Achaemenid clothing slaying an armoured, possibly Greek or Macedonian, archer.

Wahbarz became the king of Persis sometime in the 1st half of 2nd century BC, possibly in c. 205 BC. He is generally identified as the same person as Oborzos, who, according to the contemporary Macedonian author Polyaenus, was in charge of 3,000 Greek military settlers (katoikoi), whom he had executed in a place called Komastos due to suspecting them of organizing a rebellion against him. This is considered the first attempt by a frataraka to secede from Seleucid rule. Coins were minted celebrating his killing of the katoikoi, with Wahbarz being depicted in Achaemenid clothing killing a Greek enemy. The inscription of the coin was "Wahbarz was/may be victorious, (he) who (is) the commander [the karanos (κἀρανος)]". This most likely took place between 205 and 190/189 BC, presumably after the Seleucid defeat to the Roman Republic at the battle of Thermopylae in 191 BC. Before this defeat, the Seleucid Empire had under its king Antiochus III the Great (r. 222 – 187 BC) gained several military victories and substantially expanded the empire's territory in both the east and west, thus providing Wahbarz few favorable circumstances to take advantage of brief Seleucid weakness and the risk of losing his realm.

After the death of Antiochus III the Great in 187 BC, however, Seleucid rule weakened in its southern provinces, which allowed Persis under Wahbarz to not only declare independence, but also expand over the region of Characene, appointing Sagdodonacus as its governor. The precise date of the Persis conquest of Characene and Sagdodonacus' appointment is unknown. It may have been in the summer 184 BC, when Seleucid authority over its southern provinces seem to have been further weakened. It was presumably during this period that Wahbarz adopted the title of kāren (the Greek equivalent being autokrator), which was a title carried by prominent Achaemenid military leaders, such as Cyrus the Younger.

In 164 BC, during the reign of Antiochus IV Epiphanes (r. 175 – 164 BC), Seleucid authority was re-established over Persis and Characene. The expedition was led by the Seleucid general Noumenios, who replaced Sagdodonacus as the governor of Characene. This indicates that Wahbarz had ruled three decades as an independent ruler, which makes the chronology of the Persid rulers suggested by Wiesehofer less valid. The fate of Wahbarz after the Seleucid reconquest is disputed; he may have re-submitted to the Seleucids before they continued their expedition into Persis, and was thus allowed to continue to rule as a Seleucid vassal once again. Regardless, Wahbarz was seemingly succeeded by Baydad in the same year.

== Bibliography ==
=== Ancient works ===
- Polyaenus, Stratagems in War.

=== Modern works ===
- Curtis, Vesta Sarkhosh (2007), "The Iranian Revival in the Parthian Period", in Curtis, Vesta Sarkhosh and Sarah Stewart (ed.), The Age of the Parthians: The Ideas of Iran, vol. 2, London & New York: I.B. Tauris & Co Ltd., in association with the London Middle East Institute at SOAS and the British Museum, pp. 7–25, ISBN 978-1-84511-406-0.
- Engels, David (2018). "Iranian Identity and Seleucid Allegiance; Vahbarz, the Frataraka and Early Arsacid Coinage". In Erickson, K. (ed.). The Seleukid Empire, 281-222 BC. War within the Family. Swansea. pp. 173–196.
- Shayegan, M. Rahim (2011). Arsacids and Sasanians: Political Ideology in Post-Hellenistic and Late Antique Persia. Cambridge University Press. pp. 1–539. ISBN 9780521766418.
- Sellwood, David (1983), "Minor States in Southern Iran", in Yarshater, Ehsan (ed.), Cambridge History of Iran, vol. 3, London: Cambridge UP, pp. 299–322
- Shahbazi, A. Sh. (1986). "Arsacids i. Origins". Encyclopaedia Iranica, Vol. II, Fasc. 5. p. 525.
- Wiesehöfer, Josef (2000). "Frataraka". Encyclopaedia Iranica, Vol. X, Fasc. 2. p. 195.
- Wiesehöfer, Josef (2009). "Persis, Kings of". Encyclopaedia Iranica.
- Wiesehöfer, Josef (2013). "Fratarakā and Seleucids". In Potts, Daniel T. (ed.). The Oxford Handbook of Ancient Iran. Oxford University Press. pp. 728–751. ISBN 9780190668662.

Wahbarz
Preceded by Ardakhshir I	Frataraka of Persis c. 205(?)–164 BC	Succeeded by Baydad
