= Ardakhshir I =

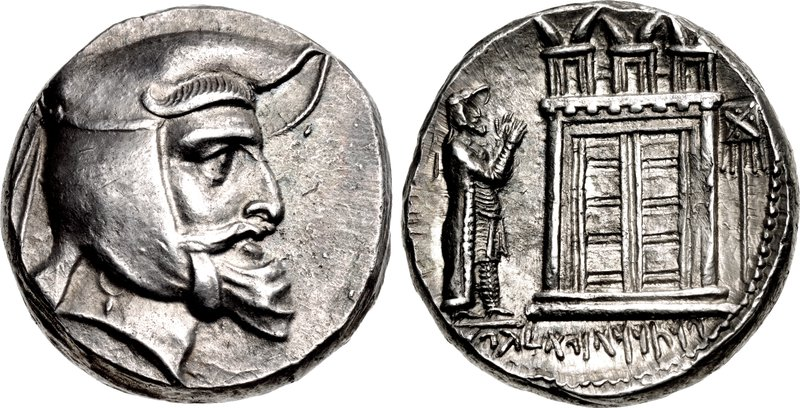
- Coin of Ardakhshir, early-mid 3rd century BC, depicting a fire temple of Ahura Mazda

Frataraka of Persis
- Reign: after 220 – c. 205 BC (?)
- Successor: Wahbarz
- Died: 205 BC (?)
- Religion: Zoroastrianism

Ardakhshir I (also spelled Artaxerxes I; Aramaic: rtḥštry) was a dynast (frataraka) of Persis in the late 3rd-century BC, ruling sometime after 220 to c. 205 BC.

== Name ==
Ardakhshir (Ardashir) is the Middle Persian form of the Old Persian Ṛtaxšira (also spelled Artaxšaçā, meaning "whose reign is through truth"). The Latin variant of the name is Artaxerxes. Three kings of the Achaemenid Empire were known to have the same name.

== Reign ==
Since the end of the 3rd or the beginning of the 2nd century BCE, Persis had been ruled by local dynasts subject to the Seleucid Empire. They held the ancient Persian title of frataraka ("leader, governor, forerunner"), which is also attested in the Achaemenid-era. The Achaemenid Empire, which had a century earlier ruled most of the Near East, originated from the region. The frataraka themselves emphasized their close affiliation with the prominent Achaemenid king of kings, and their court was probably at the former Achaemenid capital of Persepolis, where they financed construction projects on and near the Achaemenid plateau. The frataraka had traditionally been regarded as priestly dynasts or advocates of religious (and political) opposition to Hellenism, however, this is no longer considered the case.

The chronology of the early Persid rulers is disputed. The traditional view was that the chronology of the early rulers were; Baydad, Ardakhshir I, Wahbarz, Wadfradad I and Wadfradad II. However, recent findings of Persis coins have led to more a likely chronology; Ardakhshir I, Wahbarz, Wadfradad I, Baydad and Wadfradad II.

== Sources ==
- Curtis, Vesta Sarkhosh (2007), "The Iranian Revival in the Parthian Period", in Curtis, Vesta Sarkhosh and Sarah Stewart (ed.), The Age of the Parthians: The Ideas of Iran, vol. 2, London & New York: I.B. Tauris & Co Ltd., in association with the London Middle East Institute at SOAS and the British Museum, pp. 7–25, ISBN 978-1-84511-406-0.
- Schmitt, R. (1986b). "Artaxerxes". Encyclopaedia Iranica, Vol. II, Fasc. 6. pp. 654–655.
- Shayegan, M. Rahim (2011). Arsacids and Sasanians: Political Ideology in Post-Hellenistic and Late Antique Persia. Cambridge University Press. pp. 1–539. ISBN 9780521766418.
- Sellwood, David (1983), "Minor States in Southern Iran", in Yarshater, Ehsan (ed.), Cambridge History of Iran, vol. 3, London: Cambridge UP, pp. 299–322
- Shahbazi, A. Sh. (1986). "Arsacids i. Origins". Encyclopaedia Iranica, Vol. II, Fasc. 5. p. 525.
- Wiesehöfer, Joseph (1986). "Ardašīr I i. History". Encyclopaedia Iranica, Vol. II, Fasc. 4. pp. 371–376.
- Wiesehöfer, Josef (2000). "Frataraka". Encyclopaedia Iranica, Vol. X, Fasc. 2. p. 195.
- Wiesehöfer, Josef (2009). "Persis, Kings of". Encyclopaedia Iranica.

Ardakhshir I
| Preceded by (new founding) | Frataraka of Persis after 220–c. 205 BC (?) | Succeeded by Wahbarz |
