= Sagdodonacus =

Sagdodonacus was an Iranian officer, who served as the governor of Characene from c. 184 BC to 164 BC under suzerainty of the Frataraka rulers of Persis. He was the father of Hyspaosines.

== Name ==
The name of Sagdodonacus ("to hold, to keep") is seemingly Bactrian and he was presumably of Bactrian origin himself. He was called Saxt in the accounts of the 10th-century historian Hamza al-Isfahani.

== Biography ==
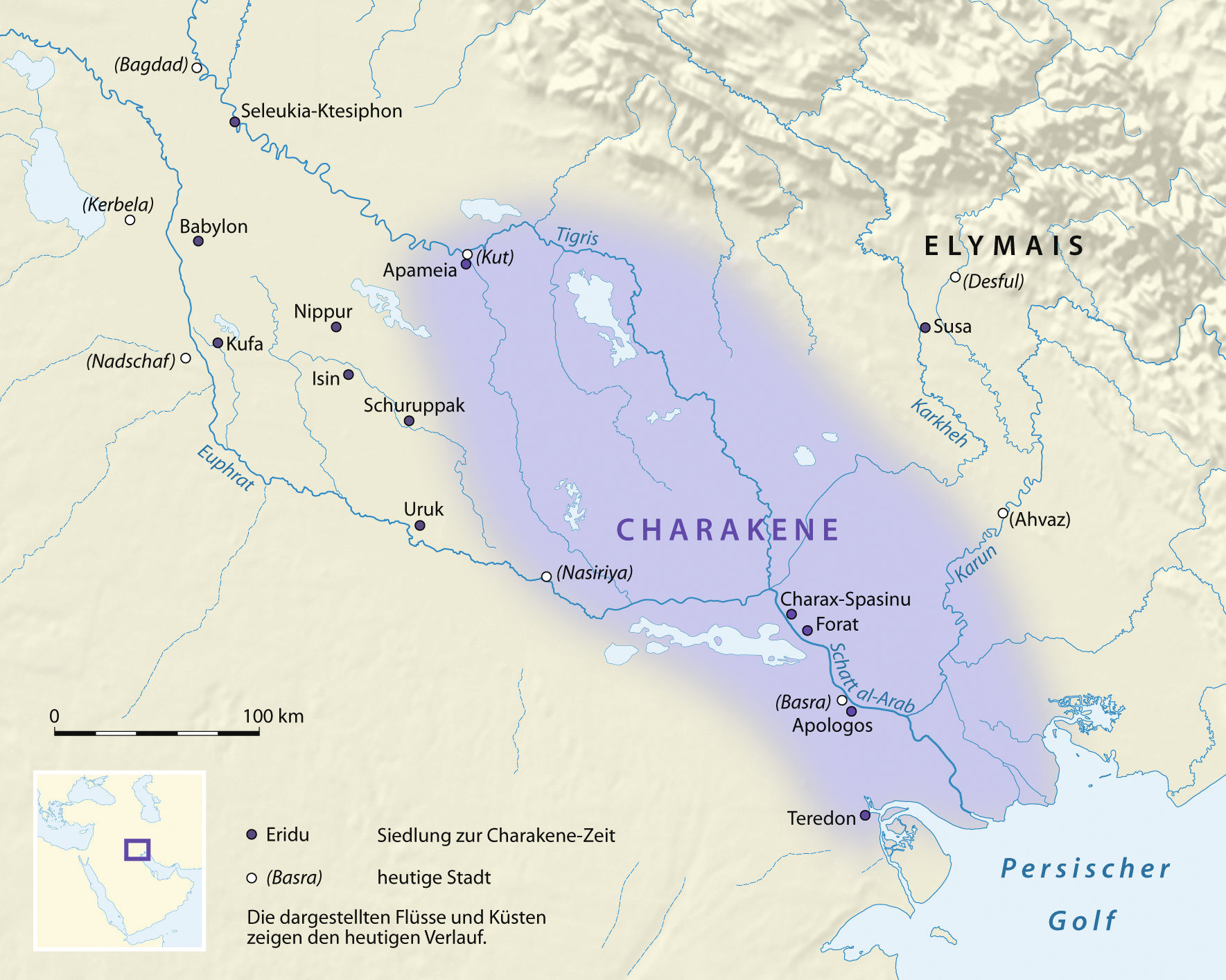
Map of Characene and its surroundings.

The Frataraka rulers of Persis were local rulers subject to the Seleucid Empire since the 2nd century BC. After the death of Antiochus III the Great in 187 BC, however, Seleucid rule weakened in its southern provinces, which allowed Persis under Wahbarz to not only declare independence, but also expand over the region of Characene, appointing Sagdodonacus as its governor. The precise date of the Persis conquest of Characene and Sagdodonacus' appointment is unknown. It may have been in the summer 184 BC, when Seleucid authority over its southern provinces seem to have been further weakened.

In 164 BC, during the reign of Antiochus IV Epiphanes (r. 175 – 164 BC), Seleucid authority was re-established over Persis and Characene. The expedition was led by the Seleucid general Noumenios, who replaced Sagdodonacus as the governor of Characene. The fate of Sagdodonacus afterwards remains unknown; he was survived by his son Hyspaosines, who served as the Seleucid governor of Characene, and later declared independence, creating a principality in the region, which would last till 222 when it was incorporated by the Sasanian Empire.

== Sources ==
- Schippmann, K. (1986). "Arsacids ii. The Arsacid dynasty". Encyclopaedia Iranica, Vol. II, Fasc. 5. pp. 525–536.
- Hansman, John F. (1998). "Elymais". Encyclopaedia Iranica, Vol. VIII, Fasc. 4. pp. 373–376.
- Hansman, John (1991). "Characene and Charax". Encyclopaedia Iranica, Vol. V, Fasc. 4. pp. 363–365.
- Bosworth, C. E. (1986). "ʿArab i. Arabs and Iran in the pre-Islamic period". Encyclopaedia Iranica, Vol. II, Fasc. 2. pp. 201–203.
- Shayegan, M. Rahim (2011). Arsacids and Sasanians: Political Ideology in Post-Hellenistic and Late Antique Persia. Cambridge University Press. pp. 1–539. ISBN 9780521766418.
- Curtis, Vesta Sarkhosh (2007), "The Iranian Revival in the Parthian Period", in Curtis, Vesta Sarkhosh and Sarah Stewart (ed.), The Age of the Parthians: The Ideas of Iran, vol. 2, London & New York: I.B. Tauris & Co Ltd., in association with the London Middle East Institute at SOAS and the British Museum, pp. 7–25, ISBN 978-1-84511-406-0.
- Eilers, Wilhelm (1983), "Iran and Mesopotamia", in Yarshater, Ehsan (ed.), Cambridge History of Iran, vol. 3, London: Cambridge UP, pp. 481–505
