= Kyrbasia =

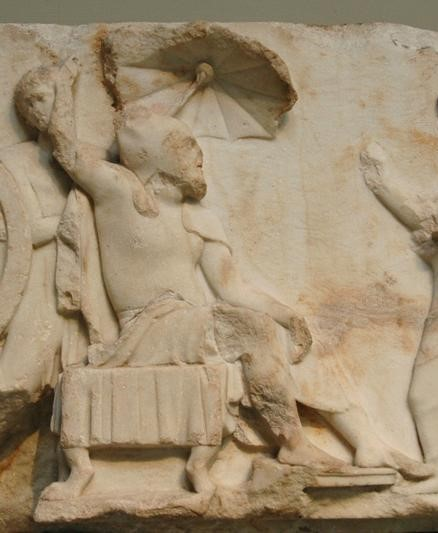
The satrap Arbinas wearing a kyrbasia. Nereid Monument.

The kyrbasia (Old Persian: *kurpāsa) was a type of headgear worn by the satraps of the Achaemenid Empire. It was later adopted by several post-Achaemenid dynasties, including the early Arsacids of Parthia, the early Ariarathids of Cappadocia, the Orontids of Sophene, and the Frataraka of Persis.

The kyrbasia is sometimes erroneously referred to as a bashlyk, the Turkic word (başlık in Turkish) for a similar headgear used by Cumans, Kipchaks and Tatars during the Middle Ages.

The kyrbasia may be identical with the headgear called kidaris in ancient sources.

== Sources ==
- Canepa, Matthew (2018). The Iranian Expanse: Transforming Royal Identity Through Architecture, Landscape, and the Built Environment, 550 BCE–642 CE. Oakland: University of California Press. ISBN 9780520379206.
- Shahbazi, Shapur (1992). "Clothing ii. In the Median and Achaemenid periods". In Yarshater, Ehsan (ed.). Encyclopædia Iranica. Vol. V/7: Class system V–Clothing X. London and New York: Routledge & Kegan Paul. pp. 723–737. ISBN 978-0-939214-75-4.
- Strootman, Rolf (2017). "Imperial Persianism: Seleukids, Arsakids and Fratarakā". In Strootman, Rolf; Versluys, Miguel John (eds.). Persianism in Antiquity. Franz Steiner Verlag. pp. 177–201. ISBN 978-3515113823.
