= Baydad =

Dynast of Persis from 164 to 146 BC

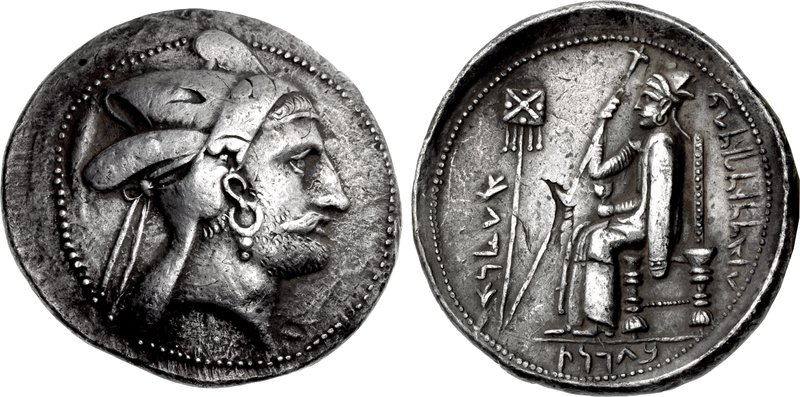
- Coin of Baydad, Persepolis mint. The reverse shows Baydad enthroned, whilst the front shows a portrait of him.

Frataraka of Persis
- Reign: 164 – 146 BC
- Predecessor: Wahbarz
- Successor: Wadfradad I
- Died: 146 BC
- Religion: Zoroastrianism

Baydad (also spelled Bagdates), was a dynast (frataraka) of Persis from 164 to 146 BC.

== Background ==
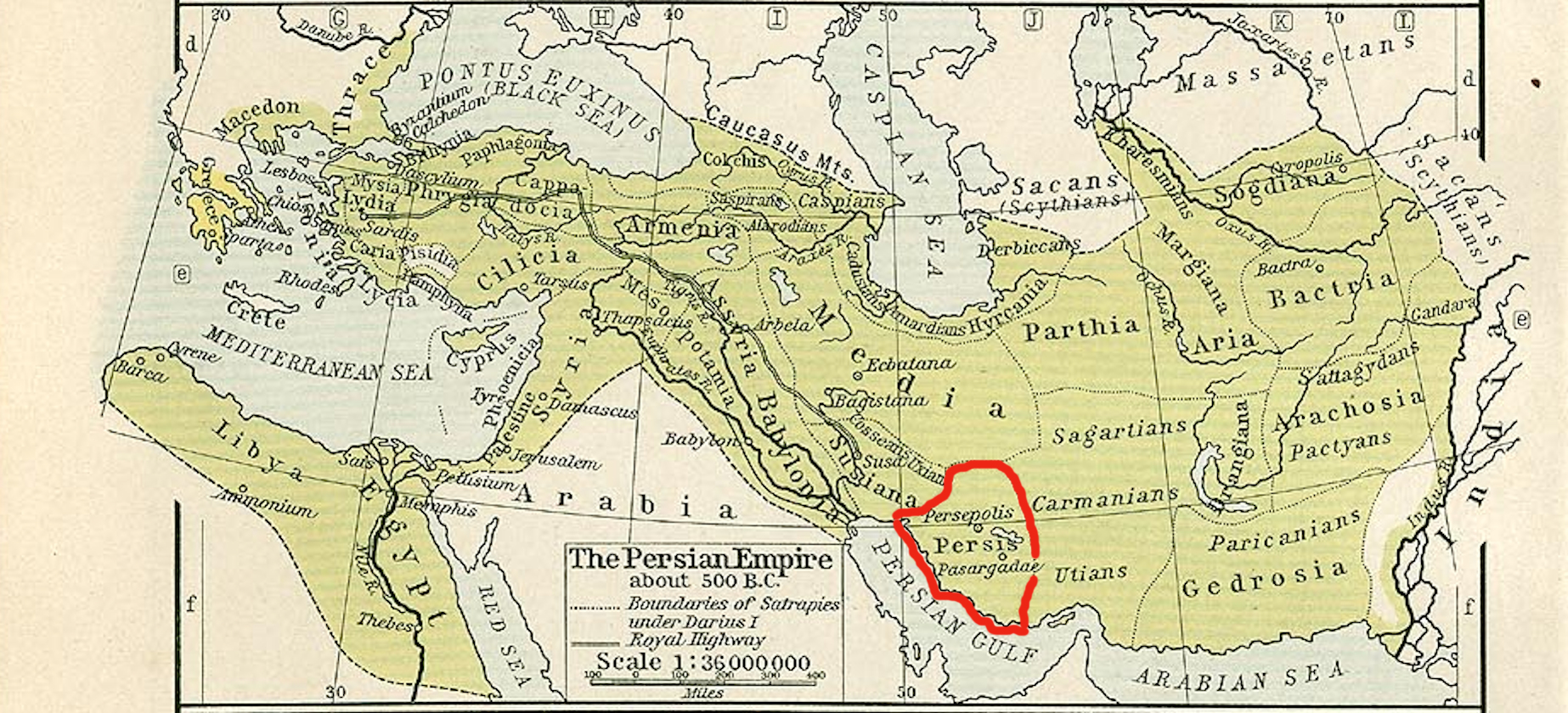
Location of Persis under the Achaemenid Empire

Since the end of the 3rd or the beginning of the 2nd century BCE, Persis had been ruled by local dynasts subject to the Seleucid Empire. They held the ancient Persian title of frataraka ("leader, governor, forerunner"), which is also attested in the Achaemenid era. The Achaemenid Empire, which had a century earlier ruled most of the Near East, originated from the region. The frataraka themselves emphasized their close affiliation with the prominent Achaemenid King of Kings, and their court was probably at the former Achaemenid capital of Persepolis, where they financed construction projects on and near the Achaemenid plateau. The frataraka had traditionally been regarded as priestly dynasts or advocates of religious (and political) opposition to Hellenism, however, this is no longer considered the case.

== Chronology of the frataraka ==
The traditional view of the chronology of the frataraka dynasts was originally; Baydad, Ardakhshir I, Wahbarz, Wadfradad I and Wadfradad II. However, recent findings of Persis coins have led to more a likely chronology; Ardakhshir I, Wahbarz, Wadfradad I, Baydad and Wadfradad II.

== Rule ==
On the reverse of his coins, Bagadates is depicted standing in front of a Zoroastrian fire-altar, or seated in majesty holding a staff of authority and possibly a pomegranate in his left hand (illustration, left).

In his coinage, Bagadates has his portrait on the obverse, wearing the satrapal headdress and the Hellenistic diadem. On the reverse, he is either shown enthroned, or making his devotions to a fire temple. The weight standard of the coins is the Attic standard, and the tetradrachm is the usual coin size, as was the usual case in the Seleucid empire. The coins are inscribed in Aramaic with the name of the ruler.

== Sources ==
- Curtis, Vesta Sarkhosh (2007), "The Iranian Revival in the Parthian Period", in Curtis, Vesta Sarkhosh and Sarah Stewart (ed.), The Age of the Parthians: The Ideas of Iran, vol. 2, London & New York: I.B. Tauris & Co Ltd., in association with the London Middle East Institute at SOAS and the British Museum, pp. 7–25, ISBN 978-1-84511-406-0.
- Shayegan, M. Rahim (2011). Arsacids and Sasanians: Political Ideology in Post-Hellenistic and Late Antique Persia. Cambridge University Press. pp. 1–539. ISBN 9780521766418.
- Sellwood, David (1983), "Minor States in Southern Iran", in Yarshater, Ehsan (ed.), Cambridge History of Iran, vol. 3, London: Cambridge UP, pp. 299–322
- Shahbazi, A. Sh. (1986). "Arsacids i. Origins". Encyclopaedia Iranica, Vol. II, Fasc. 5. p. 525.
- Wiesehöfer, Josef (2000). "Frataraka". Encyclopaedia Iranica, Vol. X, Fasc. 2. p. 195.
- Wiesehöfer, Josef (2009). "Persis, Kings of". Encyclopaedia Iranica.
- Wiesehöfer, Josef (2013). "Fratarakā and Seleucids". In Potts, Daniel T. (ed.). The Oxford Handbook of Ancient Iran. Oxford University Press. pp. 728–751. ISBN 9780190668662.

Baydad
Preceded by Wahbarz	Frataraka of Persis; 164–146 BC	Succeeded by Wadfradad I
