= Vahshuvar =

3rd-century BC Frataraka of Parthia

Frataraka of Parthia
- Reign: late 4th century BC to the early 3rd century BC

Vahshuvar (Persian: وهشوور), was a Frataraka of Parthia who was active in the late 4th century BC to the early 3rd century BC which coincided with the Seleucid Empire.

He is known from historical coins, including gold staters featuring the head of Athena on the obverse and Nike standing on the reverse.

Coins bearing his name have been identified in collections such as the British Museum and in hoards, including the Tell Kharayeb-Yanuh hoard.

== Description of his coins ==
- Coin 1 - Gold coin. (whole) Vahshuvar facing right with moustache. The frataraka wears kyrbasia tied with diadem, chin flap, and pleated dress with decorative seam along the shoulder. (obverse) Vahshuvar driving a chariot drawn by four horses to the right. Vahshuvar wears kyrbasia and arm-guards. (reverse)
- Coin 2 - Bust of Athena facing right, wearing crested Athenian helmet, and with hair in tight ringlets. (obverse) Winged Nike standing left, holding a (radiate?) crown or wreath in her outstretched right hand, and staff with trifid head in her left hand. The goddess wears a helmet and peplos. (reverse)

== Images of his coins ==
- Vahshuvar Coin1 face
- Vahshuvar Coin1 reverse
- Vahshuvar Coin2 face
- Vahshuvar Coin2 reverse
