= Frataraka =

Ancient noble rank of Persia

Bagadates, Frataraka ruler

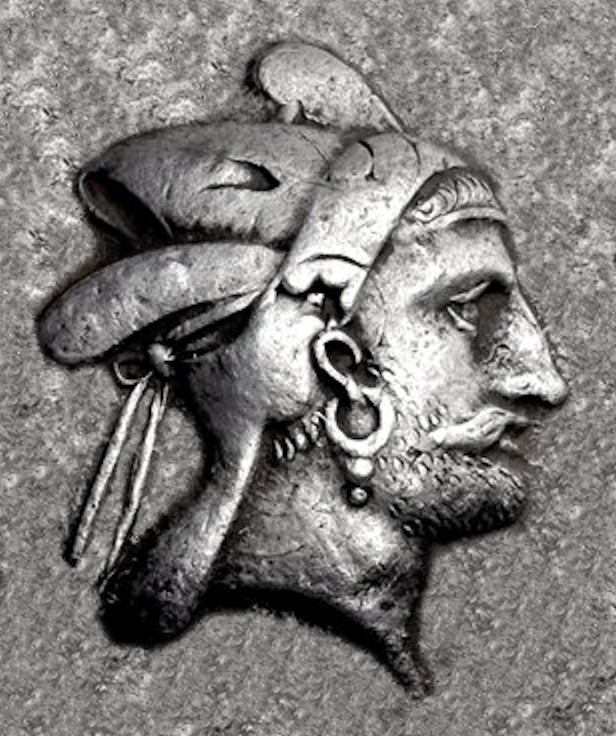
Portrait of Bagadates, 3rd c.BCE. The headgear is a combination of a satrapal tiara, and the Hellenistic diadem of a ruler.

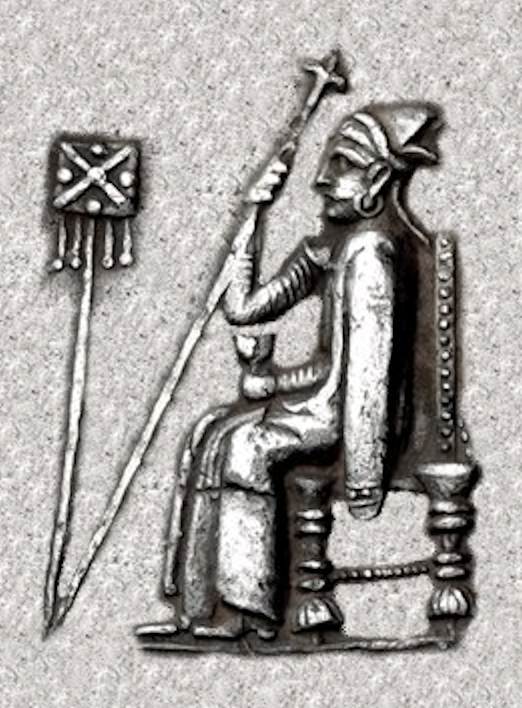
Bagadates enthroned, wearing long cloak and kyrbasia, holding sceptre and cup. Achaemenid standard to left.

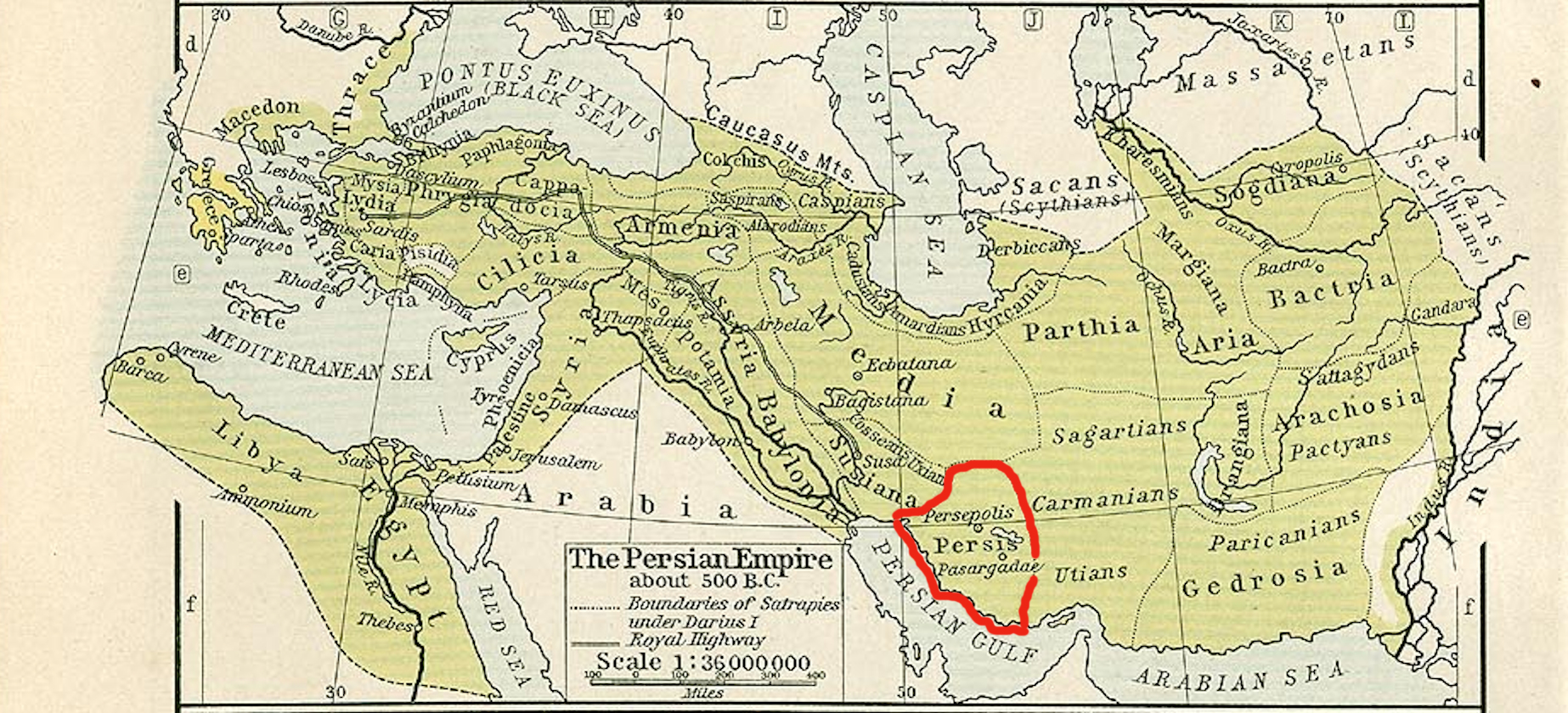
Map of Persis

Frataraka (Aramaic: 𐡐𐡓𐡕𐡓𐡊𐡀 prtrkʼ, "governor", or more specifically "sub-satrapal governor") is an ancient Persian title, interpreted variously as "leader, governor, forerunner". It is an epithet or title of a series of Persian rulers in Persis from 3rd to mid 2nd century BC, or alternatively between 295 and 220 BC, at the time of the Seleucid Empire, prior to the Parthian conquest of West Asia and Iran. Studies of frataraka coins are important to historians of this period.

== Rulers and period ==
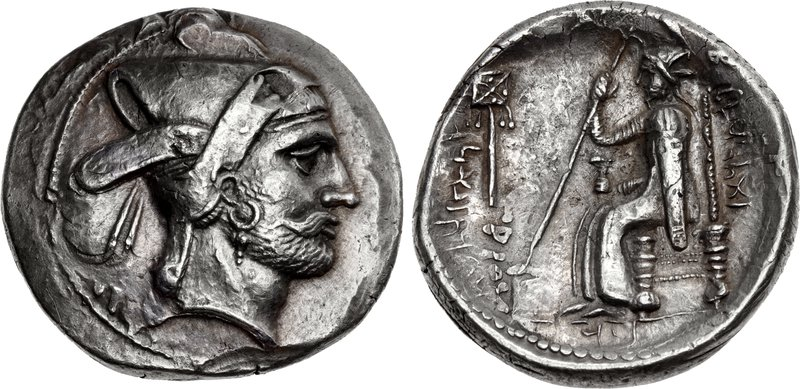
Bagadates I was the first recorded Frataraka.

Several rulers have been identified as belonging to Fratarakā dynasty (from the title prtrk' zy alhaya, or "governor of the gods" on their coins): bgdt (Baydād), rtḥštry (Ardaxšīr I), whwbrz (Vahbarz, who is called Oborzos in Polyenus 7.40), and wtprdt (Vādfradād I). Traditionally, they used to be considered as independent, anti-Seleucid rulers of Persis in the 3rd century BC. It seems however that they were rather representatives of the Seleucids in the region of Fārs. They ruled from the end of the 3rd century BC to the beginning of the 2nd century BC, and Vahbarz or Vādfradād obtained independence circa 150 BC, when Seleucid power waned in the areas of southwestern Persia and the Persian Gulf region.

Alternatively, they may have ruled between circa 295 and 220 BC, until the Seleucid briefly took back direct control of the region of Persis under the Seleucid satrap Alexander, circa 220 BC. Some authors consider that Persis remained under the control of the Seleucids throughout the 3rd century. Antiochus III is known to have visited Antiochia in Persis in 205 BC.

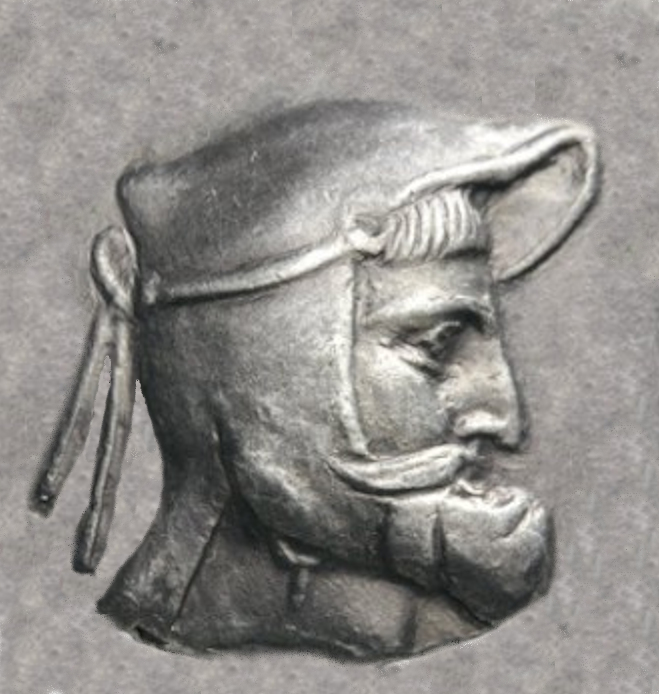
Portrait of the Frataraka Vahbarz, third Frataraka ruler, 3rd c.BCE. The headgear is a combination of a satrapal tiara, and the Hellenistic diadem of a ruler.

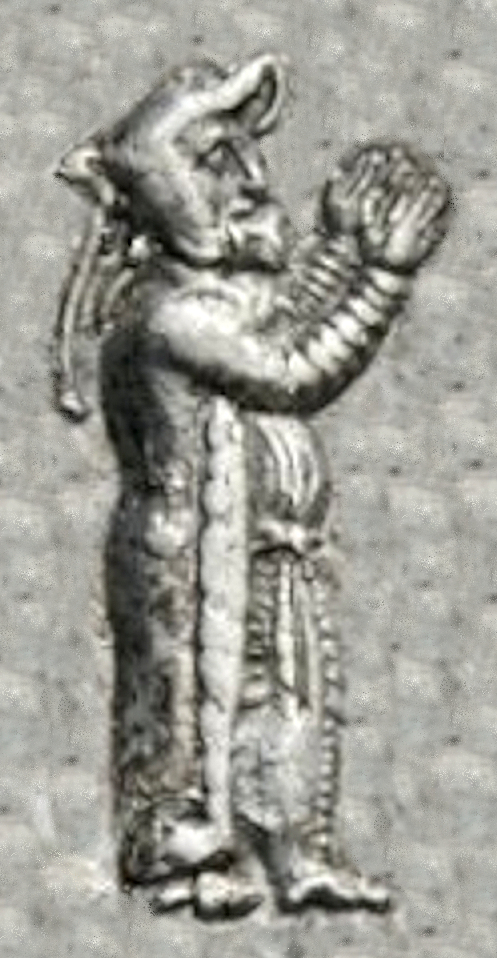
Vahbarz standing in prayer.

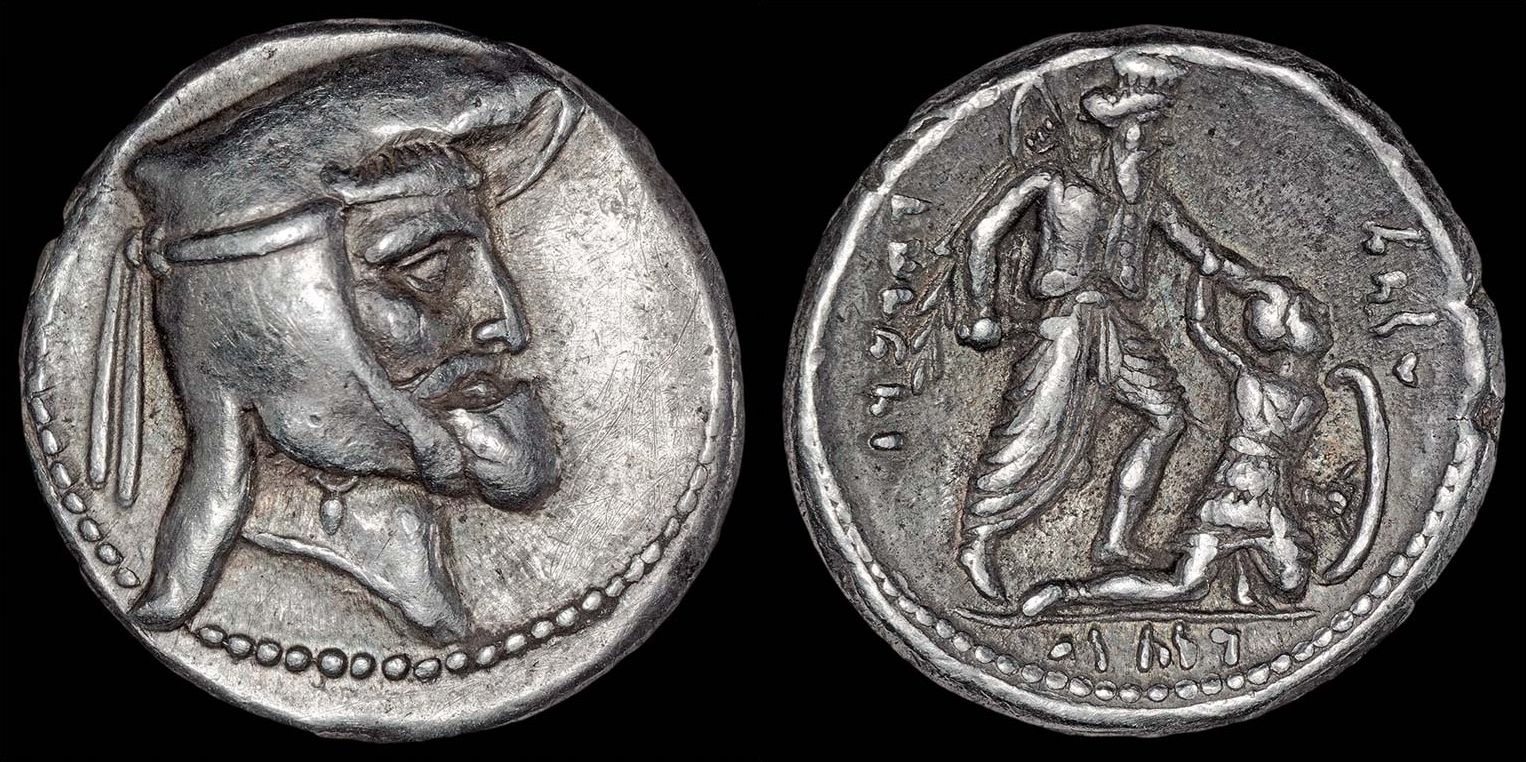
Drachm of Vahbarz/Oborzos, showing on the reverse an Achaemenid king slaying an armoured, possibly Greek or Macedonian, soldier.

Strabo relates that Persian rulers were tributaries to the Greeks, before falling under the control of the Parthians:

The Persians have kings who are subject to other kings, formerly of the kings of Macedonia, but now to the kings of the Parthians.

— Strabo XV 3.24

=== End of the Fratarakas ===
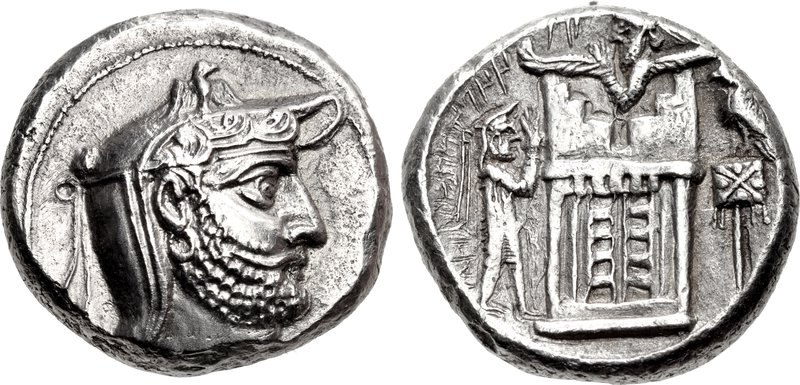
Vādfradād II (Autophradates II). A transitional ruler, sometimes using the Frataka inscription (as here), or no inscription at all, and not yet using the title of mlk ("King").

Pliny relates a battle between Noumenios, a Seleucid general and satrap of the Province of Mesene (Characene), and the Persians sometime in the 3rd or the 2nd century BCE. Pliny describes the current Seleucid ruler as being "Antiochos", but it is unknown which one he is referring to. This event is often used to describe some kind of adversary relationship between the ruler of Persis and the Seleucid Empire during the 3rd or 2nd centuries BCE, and possibly a fight for independence. The rulers of Persis may have gained independence between 205 BCE, when Antiochos III visited Antiochia in Persis in peace, and 190-189 BCE, the latest possible date for the battle led by Noumenios if the Antiochos in question is indeed Antiochos III, since the latter was defeated at the Battle of Magnesia at that time.

Pliny writes:

Noumenios, who was made governor of Mesene by king Antiochos, while fighting against the Persians, defeated them at sea, and at low water, by land, with an army of cavalry, on the same day; in memory of which event he erected a twofold trophy on the same spot, in honour of Jupiter and Neptune

— Pliny, HN 6.152.

During an apparent transitional period, corresponding to the reigns of Vādfradād II and another uncertain king, no titles of authority appeared on the reverse of their coins. The earlier title prtrk' zy alhaya (Frataraka) had disappeared. Under Dārēv I however, the new title of mlk, or king, appeared, sometimes with the mention of prs (Persis), suggesting that the kings of Persis had become independent rulers.

When the Parthian Arsacid king Mithridates I (ca. 171-138 BC) took control of Persis, he left the Persian dynasts in office and they were allowed to continue minting coins with the title of mlk ("King").

=== Sasanian Empire ===
With the reign of Šāpuhr, the son of Pāpag, the kingdom of Persis then became a part of the Sasanian Empire. Šābuhr's brother and successor, Ardaxšir (Artaxerxes) V, defeated the last legitimate Parthian king, Artabanos V in 224 CE, and was crowned at Ctesiphon as Ardaxšir I (Ardashir I), šāhanšāh ī Ērān, becoming the first king of the new Sasanian Empire.

== Roles of the Frataraka ==
During the Achaemenid Empire, frataraka was a title given to the head of a district or province in Egypt, who was junior in hierarchy to the satrap in Memphis, Egypt. During the time of Seleucid and Parthian Empires, the Aramaic on their coins suggest, depending on interpretation, that they served either deities such as Ahura Mazda or god-like kings such as the Achaemenids or Seleucids.

== Frataraka coins ==
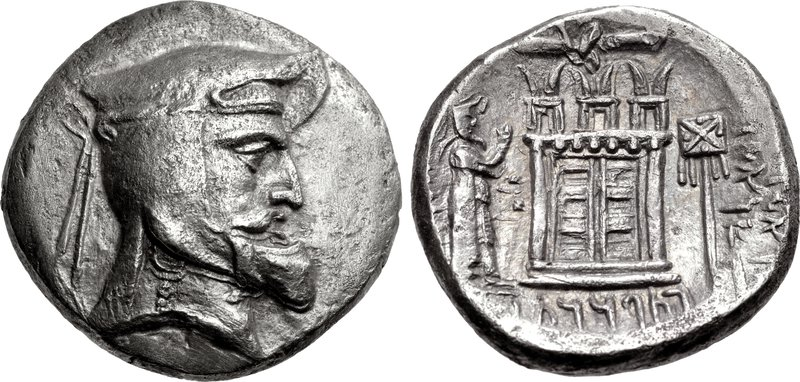
Frataraka dynasty ruler Vadfradad I (Autophradates I). 3rd century BC. Istakhr (Persepolis) mint. Head of ruler with mustache and earring, wearing diadem and kyrbasia / rtrk’ up outer left from bottom, br up inner left from bottom, wtprdt p in exergue, zy ’l’ down outer right. Fire temple of Ahura-Mazda; above, half-figure of Ahura-Mazda; to inner left, Vādfradād standing right; standard to inner right. The headgear is a combination of a satrapal tiara, and the Hellenistic diadem of a ruler.

The evidence for the quasi-autonomous local governors that were the Fratarakas is almost exclusively coming from their coinage. The Achaemenids only struck coins in the western parts of the Achaemenid Empire, mostly in Asia Minor where a coinage culture had already existing before their arrival. The Seleucid were the first one to strike coins in the area of Persis. It is during their rule that the Greek words "drachma" and "denanos" entered the Persian language, to become today's "dirham" and "denar". The Fratarakas essentially followed the example of their Seleucid overlords in striking coins. Several of their coins were further struck on issues of the Seleucids, or posthumous issues of Alexander the Great.

It seems that the coinage of the Fratarakas was mainly issued for purposes of prestige, rather than just monetary circulation, which was actually very limited. The honorific "of the gods" (Aramaic zy Thy) on their coinage may be related to the Seleucid practice of deifying their kings.

The coinage of the Fratrakas combines Seleucid and Achaemenid iconography.

The language used in the legends on the coins is Aramaic, one of the official languages of the Achaemenid Empire, rather than Greek. This, as well as the clearly Zoroastrian iconography of the coins, shows that these coins had a role as "Persid religio-political propaganda".

The Aramaic script used in the coins is quite unclear, which brings uncertainties to their reading. Even the title used by the Fratarakas prtkr* or prtdr’ is uncertain. The root word for this title has been interpreted as coming from *frat ("fire"), on the basis of the Armenian word hrat, which probably entered Iranian as a loanword. This interpretation suggestս that the rulers in question were priest-kings, whose role was mainly to maintain the sacred fire in Persepolis.

Alternatively the title may be derived from the Aramaic prlrk, used to designate an Achaemenid official in Egypt, a subordinate to a Satrap, equivalent to a "prefect, governor" who would have own his position to the Seleucids. The rulers are depicted wearing a short jacket over tunic and trousers, and they wear the satrapal tiara that had been in use on the coinage of the satraps of the Achaemenid Empire, and in addition they wear the Hellenic diadem of a ruler.

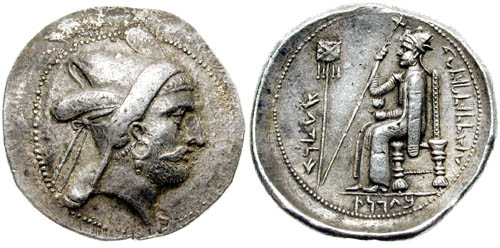
Bagadates

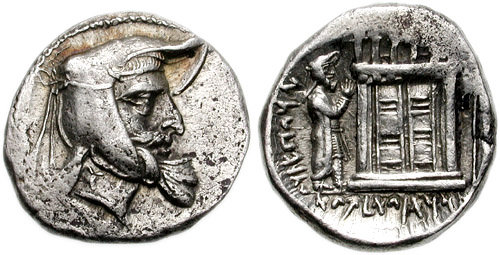
Artaxerses I (Ardaxsir I). Early-mid 3rd century BC.

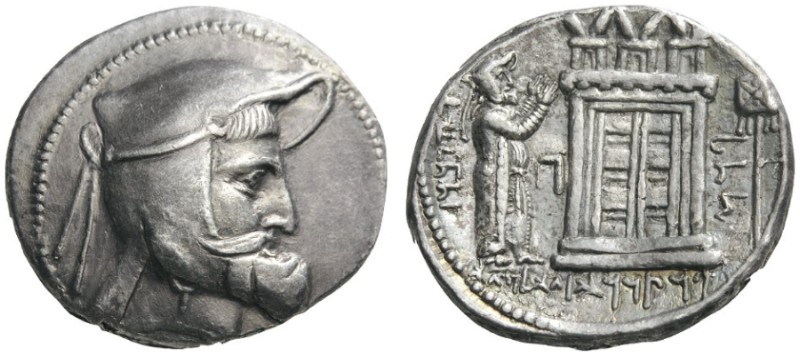
Vahbarz (Oborzos), governor, c. mid 3rd century BC

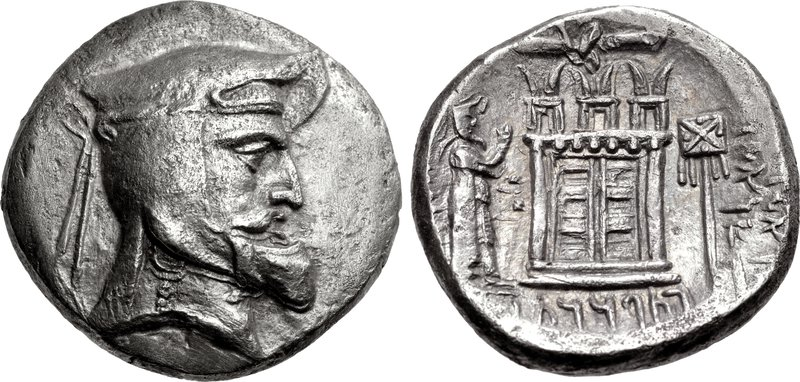
Vādfradād I (Autophradates I). 3rd century BC.

== Summary of debates ==
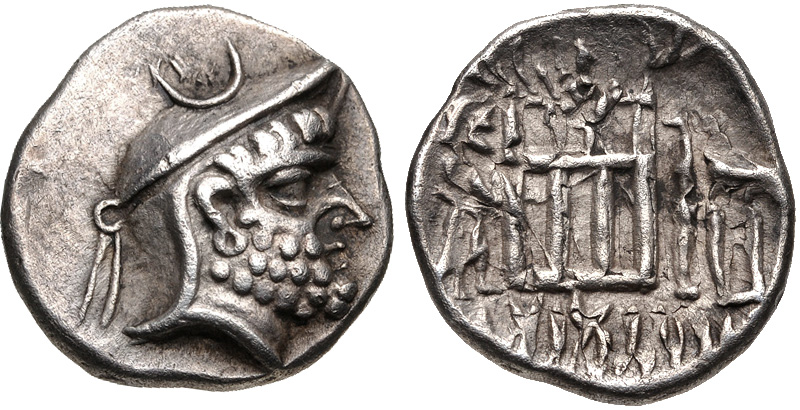
Dārēv I (Darios I) used for the first time the title of mlk (King). 2nd century BC.

There are many controversies and debates about the origin, datings and sequence of the Frataraka rulers.

Hill was the first to catalog and study them and he opted for the same dates as Herzfeld, namely to early 3rd BC. But Alram and historian Wiesehofer all pointed to later dating iconographically and epigraphically, and also based on the seamless continuation of their coinage from the first series to second and so on. They argued that they ruled by late 2nd century BC and ended by mid 2nd century BC after Parthia conquered Persia.

Some scholars such as Museler, Sarkhosh Curtis, Hoover, Engles and Mahdi TF Ahrabi believe they have started ruling by 3rd century BC, and there is plenty of evidence produced by researchers pointing to it. First, there are couple of hoards discovered by Herzfeld since 1930s, which until now are showing the existence of Frataraka coins with Seleucus I victories and trophy coins which were issued by him during 305-301 BC. If we take the circulation average of 20 years, we reach to 285-280 BC and that year coincides with his death, and his replacement by his co-regent and son Antiochus I.

There were no other coins from other Seleucid rulers discovered with Frataraka hoards suggesting the Frataraka became semi-independent and started to strike their coins instead. The significant number of undertype of Seleucus I on coins of Frataraka rulers also point out to their closeness to first the first Seleucid king and some early Seleucid influences both in iconography and typology of their coins shows they were ruling Persis earlier than 2nd BC.

=== 3rd century BCE thesis ===
Some authors have dated the rule of the Fratarakas to the 3rd century BCE, with a starting point circa 280 BCE under ruler Bagadates corresponding to a supposed Persian uprising leading to the destruction of the Tall-e Takht citadel of Pasargadae that same year. According to B. Kritt in The Early Seleucid Mint of Susa (1997), the coinage of the Fratrakas was issued in Susa, rather than Persepolis as traditionally held. He also attributed them to the period circa 295 - circa 220 BCE, and considers them as independent rulers by divine right, rather than administrators for the Seleukids. The first date of 295 BCE corresponds to the destruction of Pasargadae, which marks the end of Seleucid coinage in Susa. The end date of 220 BCE corresponds to the time when, according to Polybius, the Seleucid satrap Alexander became satrap of satrap of Persis. His brother, the Seleucid usurper Molon, was in the meantime satrap of Media.

=== 2nd century BCE thesis ===
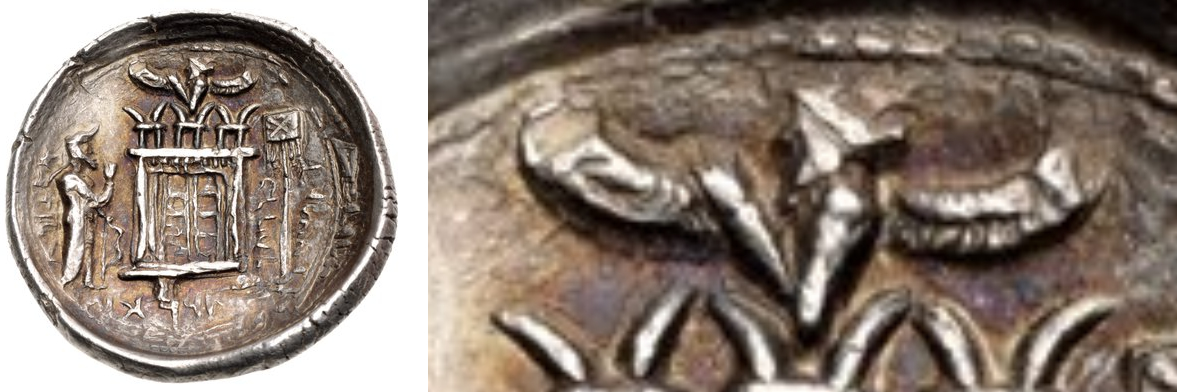
Faravahar on a coin of Vādfradād I (Autophradates I).

However, the coinage of the Fratarakas is very close to that of the Kings of Persis, which suggest the 2nd century BCE as a more probable period, after the rule of the Satrap of Persis Alexander. There is also no mention of a Persian uprising in the sources for the 3rd century BCE. On the contrary, various sources, such as the account of the visit of Antiochus III to the city of Antiochia in Persis in 205 BCE, as well as archaeological evidence, seem to suggest continuous Seleucid rule in the region. It seems that the area became independent from Seuleucid power between 200-150 BCE, before the Parthian conquest of the area. The first ruler of the Fratarakas would have been subordinate to the Seleucids (their coins are in the Seleucid weight standard, and some of their symbolism is related to the Seleucids, such as the holding of a Seuleucid scepter rather than an Achaemenid one), before obtaining some kind of independence from the time of Vahbarz or Vadfradad I (when their coinage starts to show a depiction of Khvarnah or Ahura Mazda on the reverse, on top of the fire temple).

== List of the Frataraka rulers of Persis ==
Name		Date	Coinage	Family Relations	Note
1	Bagadates/ Baydād (bgdt)	3rd century BCE		Fratarakā dynasty – son of Baykard	Governor of the Seleucid Empire. Coin legend bgdt prtrk’ zy ’lhy’ ("Baydād, fratarakā of the gods") in Aramaic.
2	Ardaxšīr I (rtḥštry)	mid-3rd century BCE		Fratarakā dynasty	Governor of the Seleucid Empire
3	Vahbarz (whwbrz – called Oborzos in Polyenus 7.40)	mid-3rd century BCE		Fratarakā dynasty	Governor of the Seleucid Empire
4	Vādfradād I (wtprdt)	3rd century BCE		Fratarakā dynasty – son of Vahbarz	Governor of the Seleucid Empire. Appearance of Ahura Mazda on the reverse, on top of the fire temple.
5	Vadfradad II	c. 140 BCE		Fratarakā dynasty	Governor of the Seleucid Empire. Eagle emblem on top of stylized kyrbasia. Aramaic coin legend wtprdt [p]rtrk’ zy ’ly’ ("Vādfradād, frataraka of the gods").
6	‘Unknown king I’ (Syknlt?)	2nd half of 2nd century BCE		?	Transition period

The Fratarakas were succeeded by the Kings of Persis.

== See also ==
- Persis
- Bagdates
- Vahshuvar

== Sources ==
- Alram, M " Nomina propria Iranica in nummis ". 1986
- Boyce M & Grenet F. "A History of Zoroastrianism VO: 3 E.J Brill Leiden Publications, 1991, PP110-113
- Brandenstein W & Mayrhofer M. "Handbuch des Altpersischen," Wiesbaden, 1964.
- Cowley, A.E "Aramaic Papyri of the Fifth Century B.C"., Oxford, 1923.
- Curtis, V S "The Frataraka Coins of Persis: Bridging the Gap between Achaemenid and Sasanian Persia" in World of Achaemenid Persia; history, art and society in Iran and the ancient Near East; Edited; 379-396, I. B. Tauris, London; 2010
- Gholami, Kiarash (2021). "A Revised Frataraka Chronology and Coinage". In Faghfoury, Mostafa (ed.). Ancient Iranian Numismatics: In Memory of David Sellwood. Brill. pp. 135–156. ISBN 978-1-949743-16-6.
- Klose, D.O. & Müseler W. "Die Münzen aus Persepolis von Alexander dem Großen zu den Sasaniden".(Munich, 2008).
- Naster P. "Note G’epigraphie Monetaire De Perside Fratakara, Fratakara, Fratadara" Leiden 1968, PP 74–77
- Panaino A. "The Bagan of the Frataraka: Gods or divine kings? "in: C.G. Cereti at al. (ed. s), Religious themes and texts of pre-islamic Iran and Central, Asia, Wiesbaden 2003, pp. 265-288
- Skjaervo P.O, " The Joy of the Cup". Bulletin of Asia institute, 1997 P 102
- Wiesehöfer, J. "PRTRK, RB HYLʾ und MRʾ," in H. Sancisi-Weerdenburg and A. Kuhrt, eds., Achaemenid History VI. Asia Minor and Egypt: Old Cultures in a New Empire, Leiden, 1991, pp. 305–9.
- Wiesehöfer, J. "Die 'dunklen Jahrhunderte' der Persis. Untersuchungen zu Geschichte und Kultur von Fārs". in frühhellenistischer Zeit (330-140 v.Chr.) (Zetemata, 90), München 1994
- Wiesehöfer J. "Frataraka Iranica online". 2000
