= Noumenios =

Location of Antiochia in Susiana, capital of Characene.

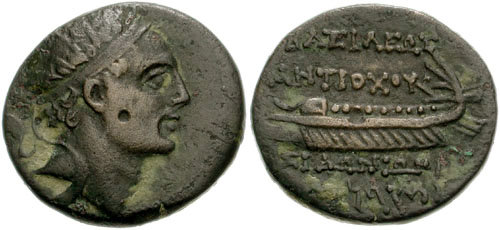
Sidon coinage of Antiochos IV, depicting a victorious galley, which may relate to the naval victories of Noumenios.

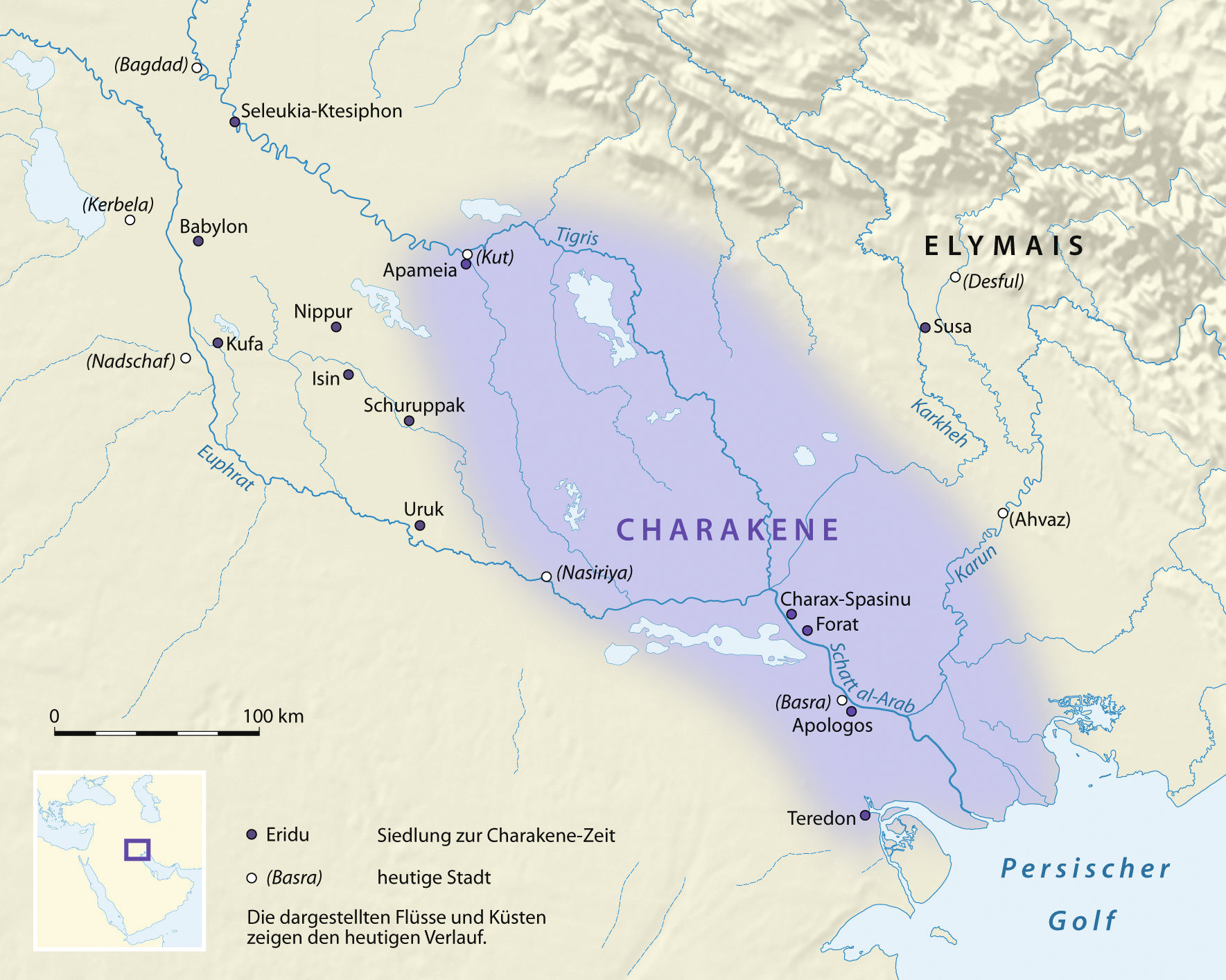
Noumenios was Seleucid satrap of Characene.

Noumenios (Ancient Greek: Νουμήνιος) was a Seleucid general and satrap of the Province of Mesene (Characene, capital Antiochia in Susiana), who is said to have defeated the Persians sometime in the 3rd or 2nd century BCE. Pliny describes his ruler as being "Antiochos", but it is unknown if this is referring to Antiochos I, Antiochos II or Antiochos III, although the battle necessarily took place before 190-189 BCE, date of the Battle of Magnesia where Antiochos III was vanquished by the Romans. Alternatively, these events may have taken place during the reign of Antiochos IV.

Pliny writes:

"Noumenios, who was made governor of Mesene by king Antiochos, while fighting against the Persians, defeated them at sea, and at low water, by land, with an army of cavalry, on the same day; in memory of which event he erected a twofold trophy on the same spot, in honour of Jupiter and Neptune"

— Pliny, HN 6.152.

This event is often used to describe some kind of adversary relationship between the Frataraka rulers of Persis and the Seleucid Empire during the 3rd or 2nd centuries BCE. The rulers of Persis may have gained independence between 205 BCE, when Antiochos III visited Antiochia in Persis in peace, and 190-189 BCE, the latest possible date for the battle led by Noumenios if the Battle of Magnesia is considered as a terminus ante quem.
