= Wadfradad I =

Dynast of Persis from 146 to 138 BC

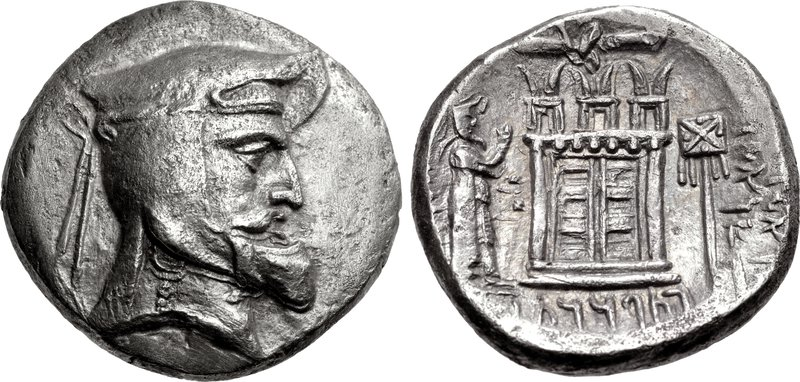
- Coin of Wadfradad I, Persepolis mint

Frataraka of Persis
- Reign: 146 – 138 BC (?)
- Predecessor: Baydad
- Successor: Wadfradad II
- Died: 138 BC (?)
- Religion: Zoroastrianism

Wadfradad I, Hellenized as Autophradates I was a dynast (frataraka) of Persis in the late 2nd-century BC, ruling from 146 to 138 BC. He was succeeded by Wadfradad II.

== Sources ==
- Curtis, Vesta Sarkhosh (2007), "The Iranian Revival in the Parthian Period", in Curtis, Vesta Sarkhosh and Sarah Stewart (ed.), The Age of the Parthians: The Ideas of Iran, vol. 2, London & New York: I.B. Tauris & Co Ltd., in association with the London Middle East Institute at SOAS and the British Museum, pp. 7–25, ISBN 978-1-84511-406-0.
- Shayegan, M. Rahim (2011). Arsacids and Sasanians: Political Ideology in Post-Hellenistic and Late Antique Persia. Cambridge University Press. pp. 1–539. ISBN 9780521766418.
- Sellwood, David (1983), "Minor States in Southern Iran", in Yarshater, Ehsan (ed.), Cambridge History of Iran, vol. 3, London: Cambridge UP, pp. 299–322
- Shahbazi, A. Sh. (1986). "Arsacids i. Origins". Encyclopaedia Iranica, Vol. II, Fasc. 5. p. 525.
- Wiesehöfer, Josef (2000). "Frataraka". Encyclopaedia Iranica, Vol. X, Fasc. 2. p. 195.
- Wiesehöfer, Josef (2009). "Persis, Kings of". Encyclopaedia Iranica.

Wadfradad I
Preceded by Baydad	Frataraka of Persis; 146–138 BC (?)	Succeeded by Wadfradad II
