= Satrap =

Ruler of a province in ancient Persia

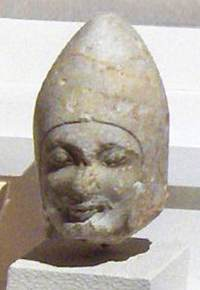
The Herakleia head, probable portrait of a Achaemenid Empire Satrap of Asia Minor, end of 6th century BCE, probably under Darius I

A satrap (/ˈsætrəp/) was a governor of the provinces of the ancient Median and Persian (Achaemenid) Empires and in several of their successors, such as in the Sasanian Empire and the Hellenistic empires. A satrapy is the territory governed by a satrap.

A satrap served as a viceroy to the king, though with considerable autonomy. The word came to suggest tyranny or ostentatious splendour, and its modern usage is a pejorative and refers to any subordinate or local ruler, usually with unfavourable connotations of corruption.

== Etymology ==
The word satrap is derived via Latin satrapes from Greek satrápes (σατράπης), itself borrowed from an Old Iranian *xšaϑra-pa. In Old Persian, which was the native language of the Achaemenids, it is recorded as xšaçapavan (𐎧𐏁𐏂𐎱𐎠𐎺𐎠, literally "protector of the province"). The Median form is reconstructed as *xšaϑrapavan-. Its Sanskrit cognate is kṣatrapa (क्षत्रप). The Biblical Hebrew form is aḥašdarpan אֲחַשְׁדַּרְפָּן, as found in Esther 3:12.

In the Parthian (language of the Arsacid Empire) and Middle Persian (the language of the Sassanian Empire), it is recorded in the forms šahrab and šasab, respectively.

In modern Persian the descendant of *xšaϑrapavan is šahrbān (شهربان), but the components have undergone semantic shift so the word now means "town keeper" (šahr شهر meaning "town" + bān بان meaning "keeper").

== History ==
=== Medo-Persian ===
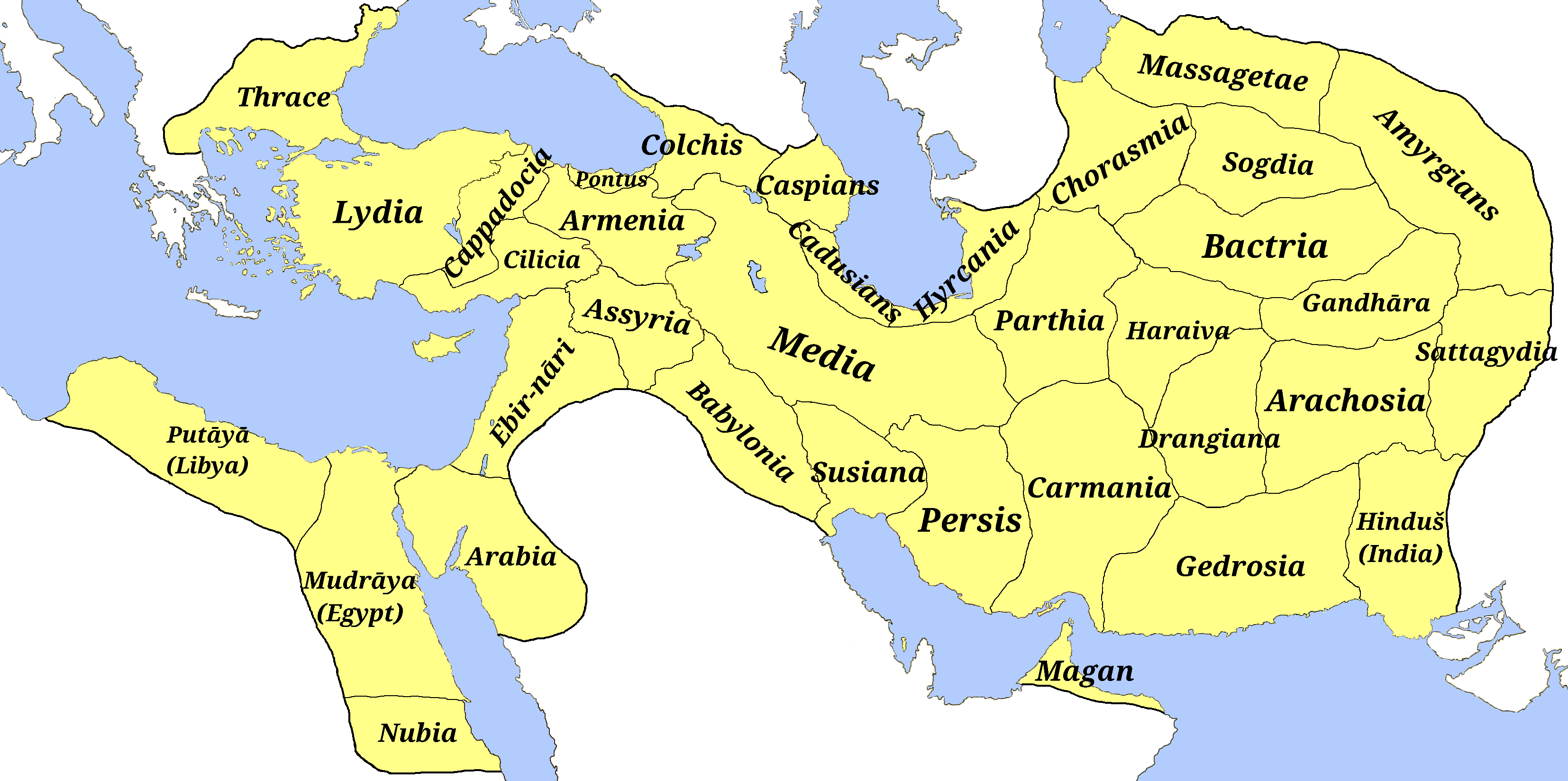
Satrapies of the Achaemenid Empire

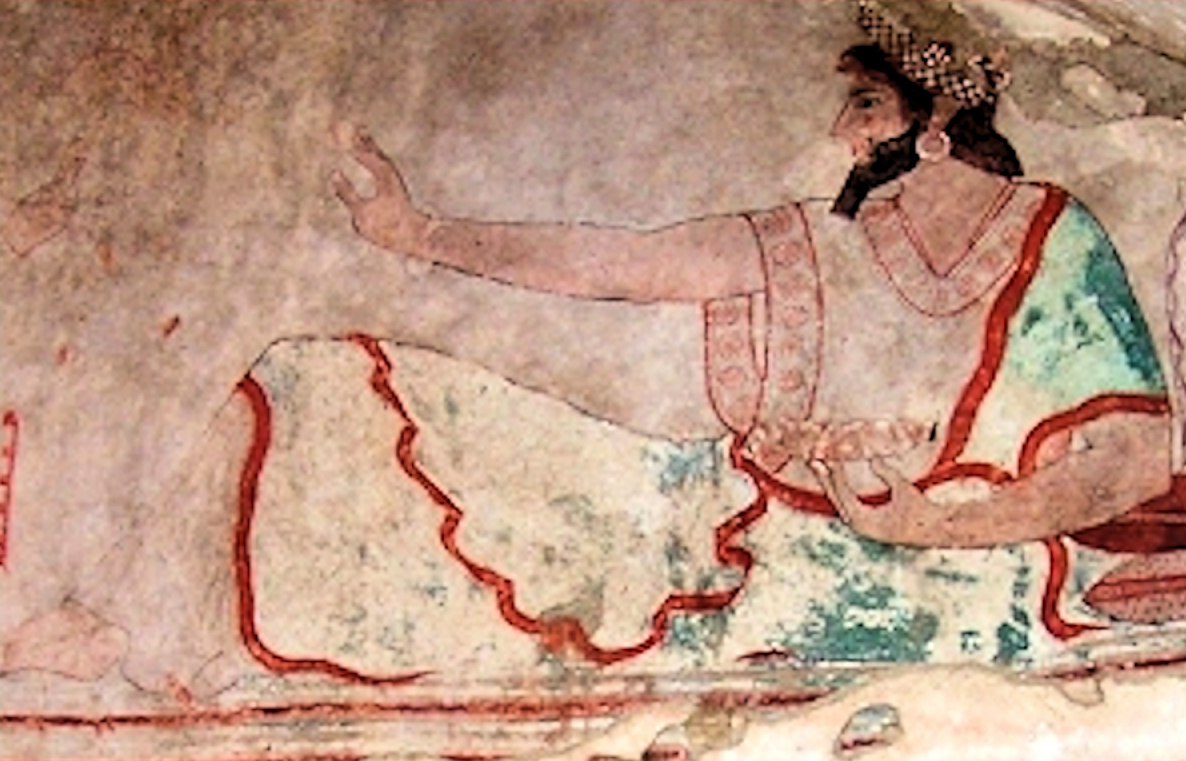
A dignitary of Asia Minor in Achaemenid style, c. 475 BC; Karaburun tomb near Elmalı, Lycia

Although the first large-scale use of satrapies, or provinces, originates from the inception of the Achaemenid Empire under Cyrus the Great, beginning at around 530 BCE, provincial organization actually originated during the Median era from at least 648 BCE.

Up to the time of the conquest of Media by Cyrus the Great, emperors ruled the lands they conquered through client kings and governors. The main difference was that in Persian culture the concept of kingship was indivisible from divinity: divine authority validated the divine right of kings. The twenty-six satraps established by Cyrus were never kings, but viceroys ruling in the king's name. However, in political reality many took advantage of any opportunity to carve out an independent power base for themselves. Darius the Great gave the satrapies a definitive organization, increased their number to thirty-six, and fixed their annual tribute (Behistun inscription).

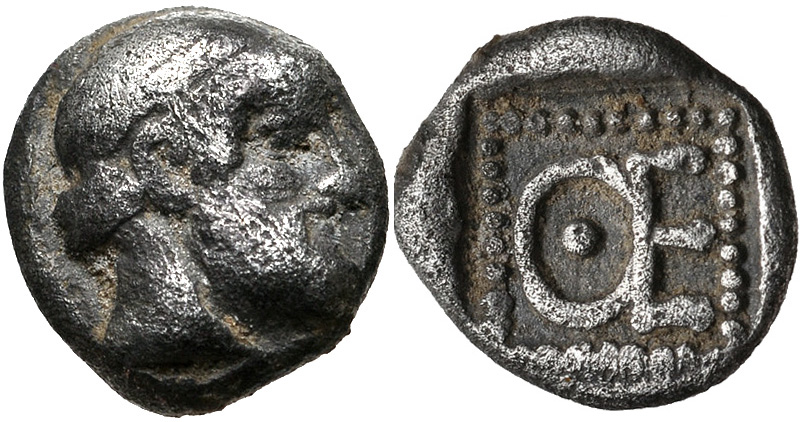
Coin of Themistocles, a former Athenian general, as Achaemenid Empire Satrap of Magnesia, c. 465–459 BC

The satrap was in charge of the land that he owned as an administrator, and found himself surrounded by an all-but-royal court; he collected the taxes, controlled the local officials and the subject tribes and cities, and was the supreme judge of the province before whose "chair" (Nehemiah 3:7) every civil and criminal case could be brought. He was responsible for the safety of the roads (cf. Xenophon), and had to put down brigands and rebels.

He was assisted by a council of Persians, to which also provincials were admitted and which was controlled by a royal secretary and emissaries of the king, especially the "eye of the king", who made an annual inspection and exercised permanent control.

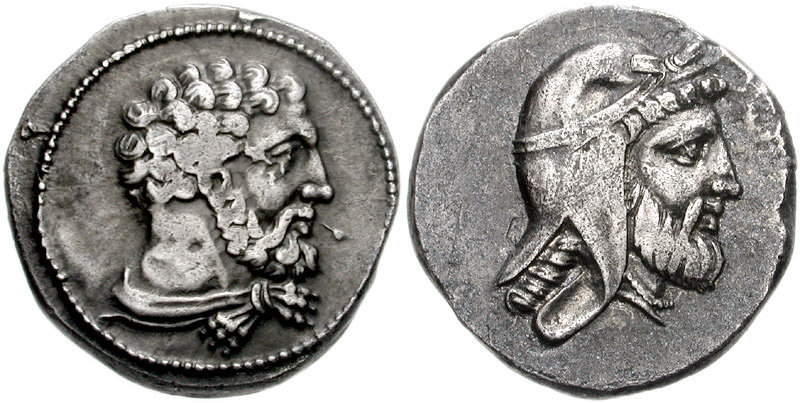
Coinage of Tiribazos, Satrap of Achaemenid Lydia, 388–380 BC

There were further checks on the power of each satrap: besides his secretarial scribe, his chief financial official (Old Persian ganzabara) and the general in charge of the regular army of his province and of the fortresses were independent of him and periodically reported directly to the shah, in person. The satrap was allowed to have troops in his own service.

The great satrapies (provinces) were often divided into smaller districts, the governors of which were also called satraps and (by Greco-Roman authors) also called hyparchs (actually Hyparkhos in Greek, 'vice-regents'). The distribution of the great satrapies was changed repeatedly, and often two of them were given to the same man.

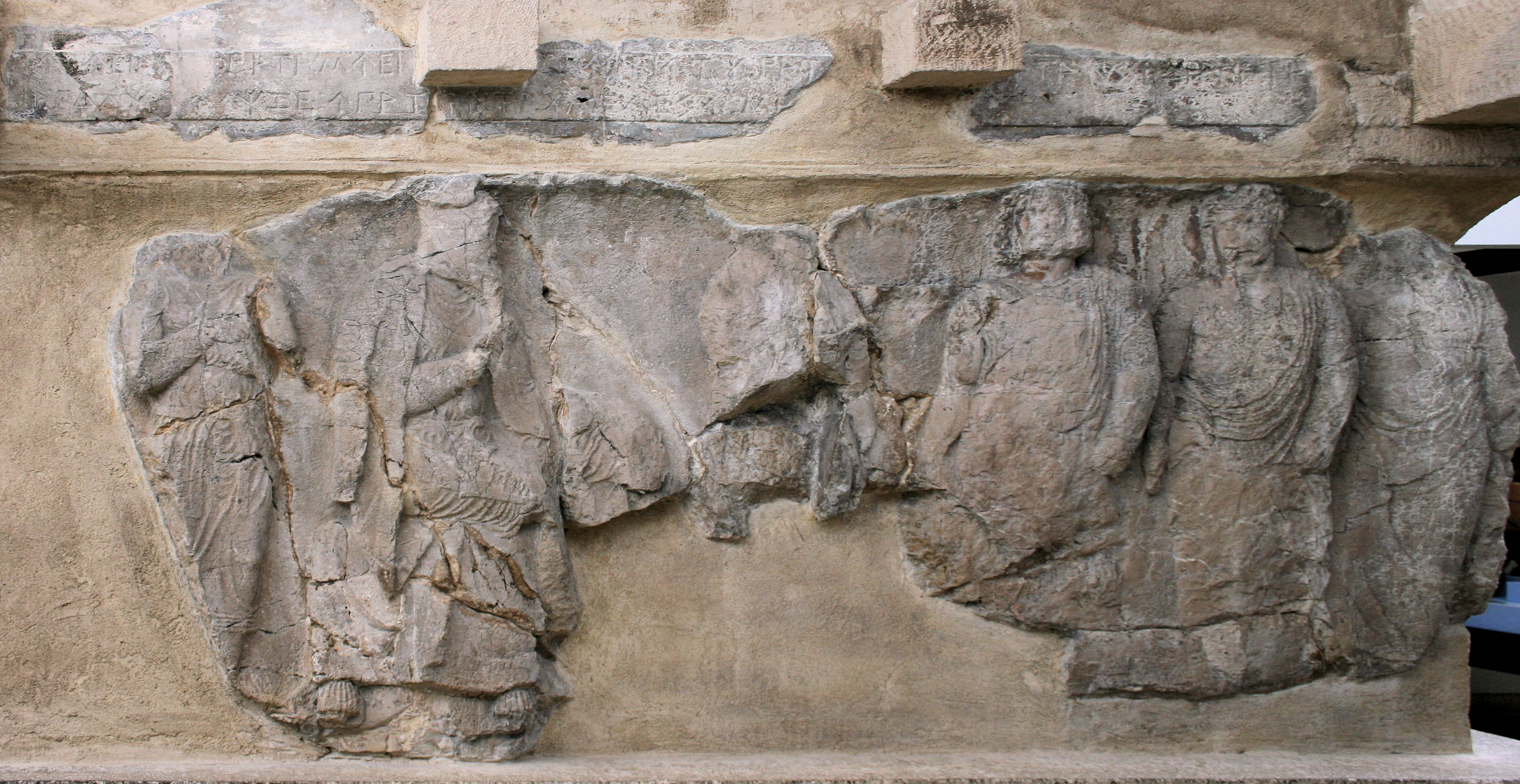
Achaemenid Satrap Autophradates receiving visitors, on the Tomb of Payava, c. 380 BC

As the provinces were the result of consecutive conquests (the homeland had a special status, exempt from provincial tribute), both primary and sub-satrapies were often defined by former states and/or ethno-religious identity. One of the keys to the Achaemenid success was their open attitude to the culture and religion of the conquered people, so the Persian culture was the one most affected as the Great King endeavoured to meld elements from all his subjects into a new imperial style, especially at his capital, Persepolis.

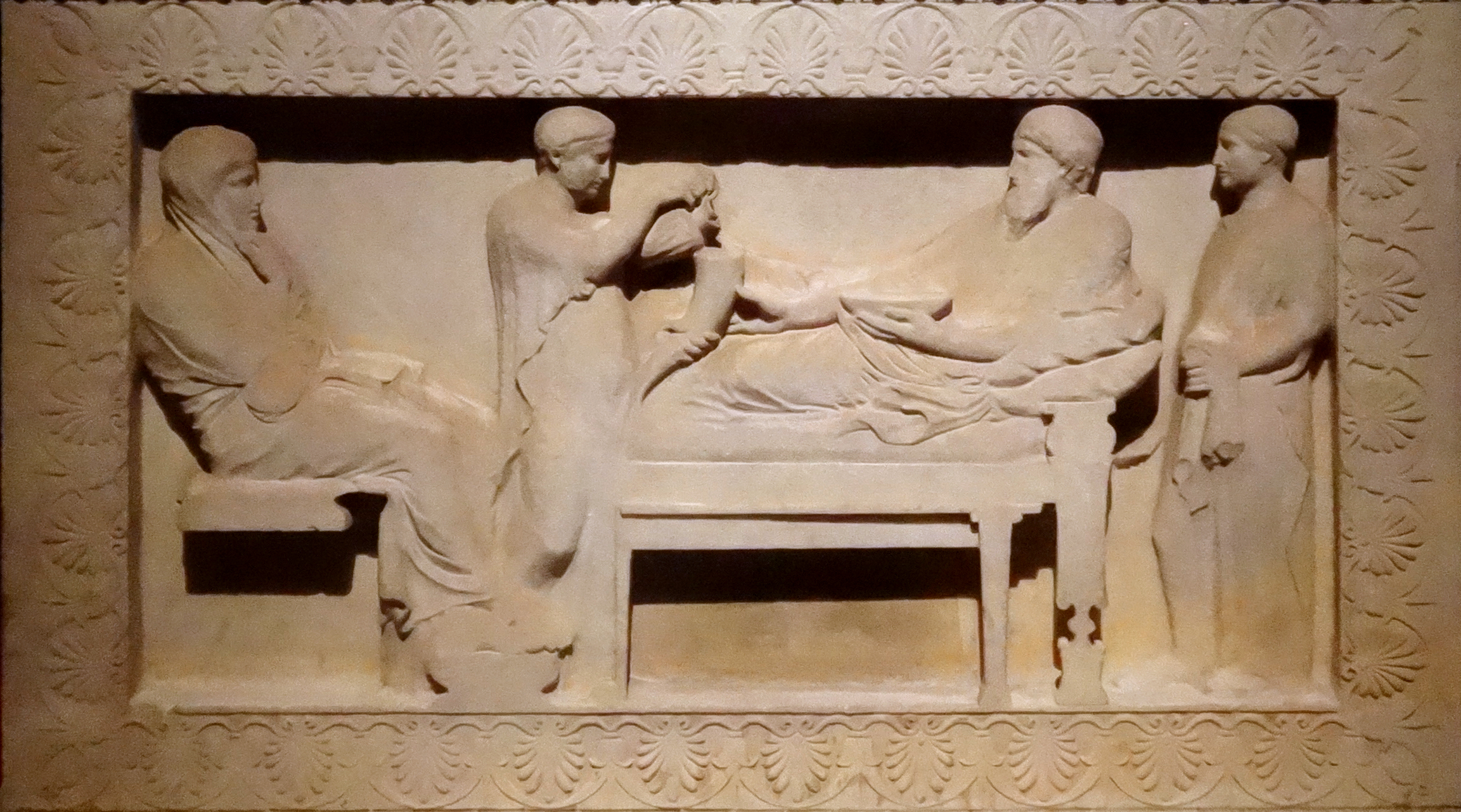
Banquet scene of a Satrap, on the "Sarcophagus of the Satrap", Sidon, 4th century BC

Whenever central authority in the empire weakened, the satrap often enjoyed practical independence, especially as it became customary to appoint him also as general-in-chief of the army district, contrary to the original rule. "When his office became hereditary, the threat to the central authority could not be ignored" (Olmstead). Rebellions of satraps became frequent from the middle of the 5th century BCE. Darius I struggled with widespread rebellions in the satrapies, and under Artaxerxes II occasionally the greater parts of Asia Minor and Syria were in open rebellion (Revolt of the Satraps).

The last great rebellions were put down by Artaxerxes III.

=== Seleucid ===
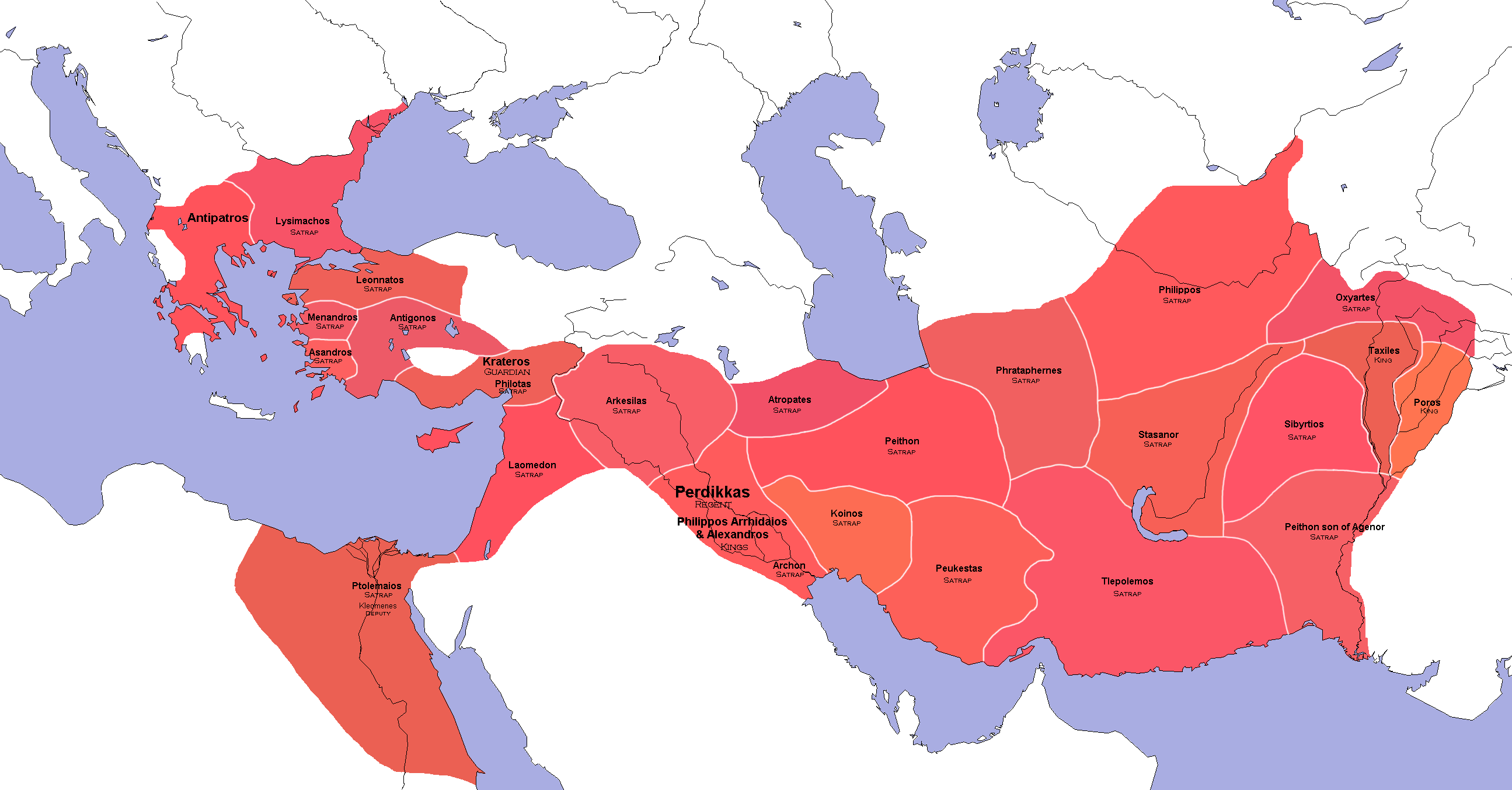
The satraps appointed by Alexander the Great during his campaign

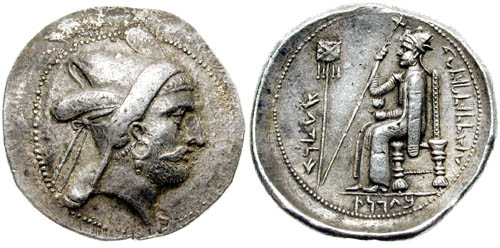
Bagadates I (Minted 290–280 BC), the first indigenous satrap to be appointed by the Seleucid Empire

The satrapic administration and title were retained—even for Greco-Macedonian incumbents—by Alexander the Great, who conquered the Achaemenid Empire, and by his successors, the Diadochi (and their dynasties) who carved it up, especially in the Seleucid Empire, where the satrap generally was designated as strategos (in other words, military generals); but their provinces were much smaller than under the Persians. They would ultimately be replaced by conquering empires, especially the Parthians.

=== Parthian and Sassanian ===
In the Parthian Empire, the king's power rested on the support of noble families, who ruled large estates and supplied soldiers and tribute to the king. City-states within the empire enjoyed a degree of self-government, and paid tribute to the king. Administration of the Sassanid Empire was considerably more centralized than that of the Parthian Empire; the semi-independent kingdoms and self-governing city states of the Parthian Empire were replaced with a system of "royal cities" which served as the seats of centrally appointed governors called shahrabs as well as the location of military garrisons. Shahrabs ruled both the city and the surrounding rural districts. Exceptionally, the Byzantine Empire also adopted the title "satrap" for the semi-autonomous princes that governed one of its Armenian provinces, the Satrapiae.

=== Indian ===
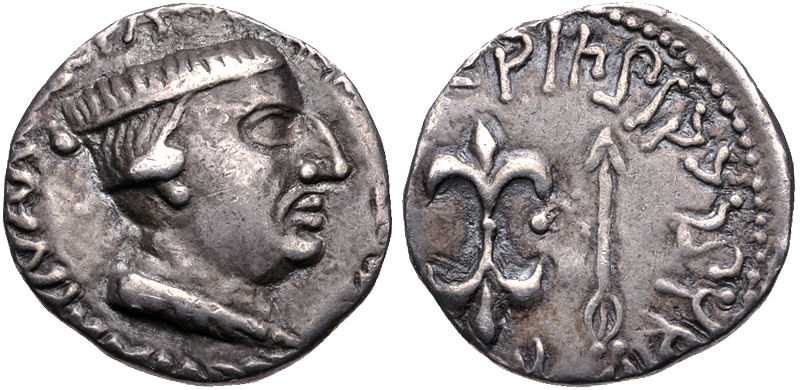
Coin (silver Drachm) of "Western Satrap" Nahapana, c. 120 CE

The Western Satraps or Kshatrapas (35–405 CE) of the Indian subcontinent were Saka rulers in the western and central part of the Sindh region of Pakistan, and the Saurashtra and Malwa regions of western India. They were contemporaneous with the Kushans, who ruled the northern part of the subcontinent from the area of Peshawar and were possibly their overlords, and with the Satavahana, who ruled in central India to their south and east and the Kushan state to their immediate west.

== See also ==
- Taxation districts of the Achaemenid Empire
- Orontid dynasty
- Suzerainty
