= Wadfradad II =

2nd-century BC dynast of Persis

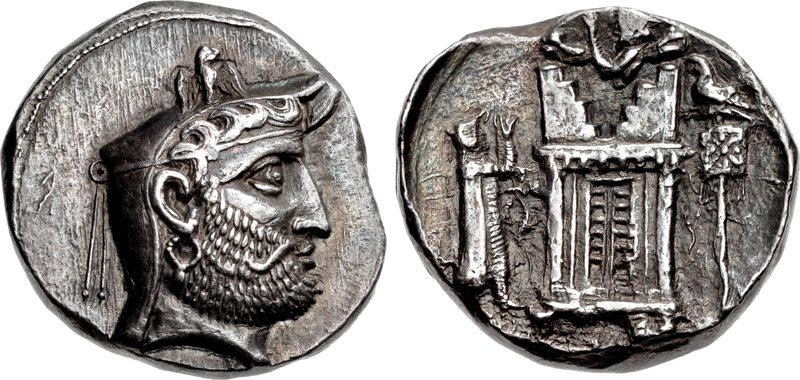
- Coin of Wadfradad II, Persepolis mint

Frataraka of Persis
- Reign: after 138 BC – after 132 BC
- Predecessor: Wadfradad I
- Successor: Darayan I
- Died: after 138 BC
- Religion: Zoroastrianism

Wadfradad II, Hellenized as Autophradates II, was a dynast (frataraka) of Persis in the late 2nd-century BC, ruling sometime after 138 BC. He was appointed as frataraka by the Parthian king Mithridates I (r. 171–132 BC), who granted him more autonomy, most likely in an effort to maintain healthy relations with Persis as the Parthian Empire was under constant conflict with the Saka, Seleucids, and Characene. The coinage of Wadfradad II shows influence from the coins minted under Mithridates I. Wadfradad II was succeeded by Darayan I, the first of the Kings of Persis.

== Sources ==
- Curtis, Vesta Sarkhosh (2007), "The Iranian Revival in the Parthian Period", in Curtis, Vesta Sarkhosh and Sarah Stewart (ed.), The Age of the Parthians: The Ideas of Iran, vol. 2, London & New York: I.B. Tauris & Co Ltd., in association with the London Middle East Institute at SOAS and the British Museum, pp. 7–25, ISBN 978-1-84511-406-0.
- Shayegan, M. Rahim (2011). Arsacids and Sasanians: Political Ideology in Post-Hellenistic and Late Antique Persia. Cambridge University Press. pp. 1–539. ISBN 9780521766418.
- Sellwood, David (1983), "Minor States in Southern Iran", in Yarshater, Ehsan (ed.), Cambridge History of Iran, vol. 3, London: Cambridge UP, pp. 299–322
- Shahbazi, A. Sh. (1986). "Arsacids i. Origins". Encyclopaedia Iranica, Vol. II, Fasc. 5. p. 525.
- Wiesehöfer, Josef (2000). "Frataraka". Encyclopaedia Iranica, Vol. X, Fasc. 2. p. 195.
- Wiesehöfer, Josef (2009). "Persis, Kings of". Encyclopaedia Iranica.

Wadfradad II
Preceded by Wadfradad I	Frataraka of Persis after 138 – after 132 BC	Succeeded by Darayan I
