= Assyria =

Major Mesopotamian civilization

Assyria 𒆳𒀭𒊹𒆠
- c. 2025 BC (Note: This date refers to when Assur became an independent city-state, i.e., the beginning of the Old Assyrian period. The Old Assyrian period was preceded by the Early Assyrian period, but Assur was not independent during this time, and distinct Assyrian cultural and religious practices had not yet fully formed.)–609 BC (Note: This date refers to the end of the Neo-Assyrian Empire, when Assyria ceased to be a state. It omits the later post-imperial period, when there was no longer an independent Assyrian kingdom.)
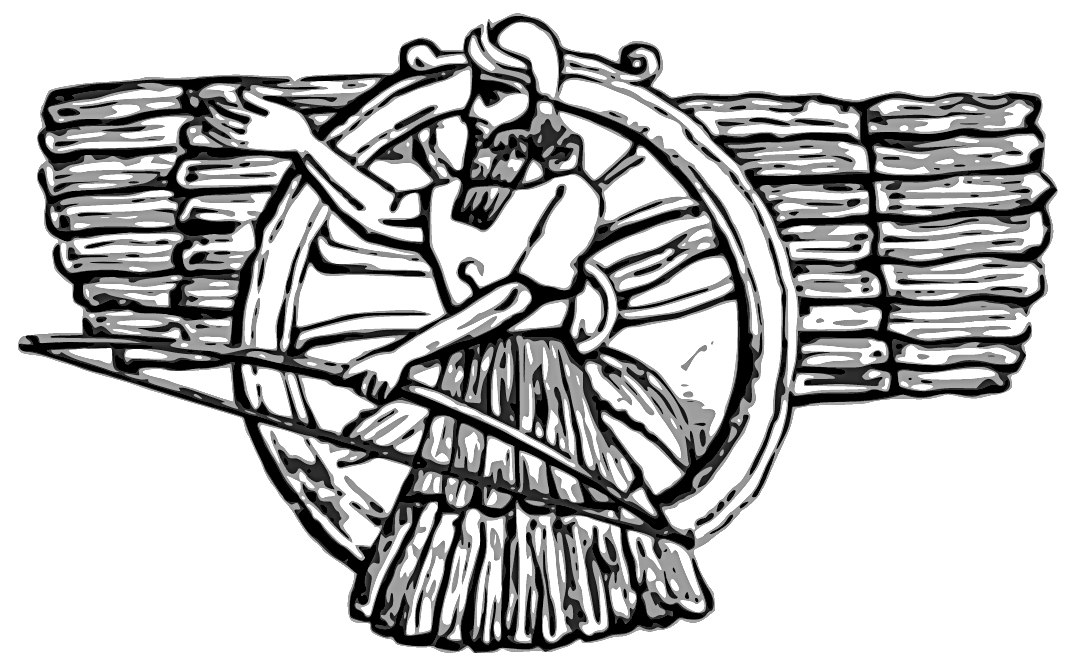
- Symbol of Ashur, the ancient Assyrian national deity

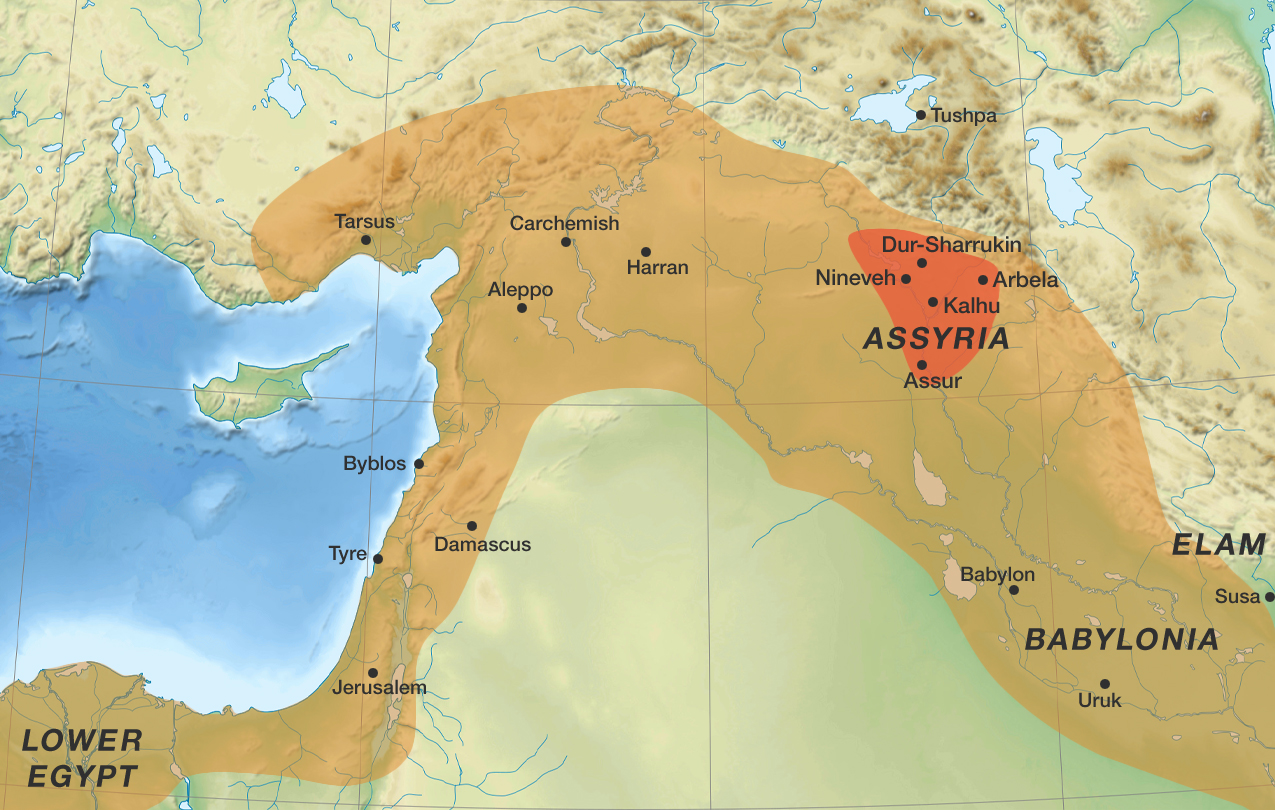
- The ancient Assyrian heartland (red) and the Neo-Assyrian Empire in the 7th century BC (orange)
- Capital: Assur (c. 2025–1233 BC); Kar-Tukulti-Ninurta (c. 1233–1207 BC); Assur (c. 1207–879 BC); Nimrud (879–706 BC); Dur-Sharrukin (706–705 BC); Nineveh (705–612 BC); Harran (612–609 BC)
- Official languages: Akkadian; Sumerian; Aramaic
- Religion: Ancient Mesopotamian religion
- Government: Monarchy
- Notable kings
  - c. 2025 BC: Puzur-Ashur I (first)
  - c. 1974–1935 BC: Erishum I
  - c. 1808–1776 BC: Shamshi-Adad I
  - c. 1700–1691 BC: Bel-bani
  - c. 1363–1328 BC: Ashur-uballit I
  - c. 1243–1207 BC: Tukulti-Ninurta I
  - 1114–1076 BC: Tiglath-Pileser I
  - 883–859 BC: Ashurnasirpal II
  - 745–727 BC: Tiglath-Pileser III
  - 705–681 BC: Sennacherib
  - 681–669 BC: Esarhaddon
  - 669–631 BC: Ashurbanipal
  - 631–627 BC: Aššur-etil-ilāni
  - 627–612 BC: Sinsharishkun
  - 612–609 BC: Ashur-uballit II (last)
- Historical era: Bronze Age to Iron Age
  - Foundation of Assur: c. 2600 BC
  - Assur becomes an independent city-state: c. 2025 BC (Note: This date refers to when Assur became an independent city-state, i.e., the beginning of the Old Assyrian period. The Old Assyrian period was preceded by the Early Assyrian period, but Assur was not independent during this time, and distinct Assyrian cultural and religious practices had not yet fully formed.)
  - Old Assyrian period: c. 2025–1364 BC
  - Middle Assyrian period: c. 1363–912 BC
  - Neo-Assyrian period: 911–609 BC
  - Conquest by the Neo-Babylonian and Median empires: 609 BC (Note: This date refers to the end of the Neo-Assyrian Empire, when Assyria ceased to be a state. It omits the later post-imperial period, when there was no longer an independent Assyrian kingdom.)
  - Sack and destruction of Assur by the Sasanian Empire: c. AD 240
Preceded by	Succeeded by
Third Dynasty of Ur	Neo-Babylonian Empire; Median Empire

Assyria (Note: Neo-Assyrian Akkadian: 𒆳𒀭𒊹𒆠, romanized: māt Aššur) was a major ancient Mesopotamian civilization that existed from the 21st to the 7th century BC which conquered and administered most of West Asia from the Assyrian heartland in Upper Mesopotamia. Assyria is called the first true military superpower in human history, and pioneered major inventions and advances in the first libraries and large-scale preservation and accumulation of knowledge, as well as in statecraft, centralised government, bureaucracy, warfare, military organisation, propaganda, art, and architecture.

Assyrian imperial history spans the early Bronze Age to the late Iron Age, from its beginning as small Akkadian settlements in northern Mesopotamia to its zenith and collapse as the largest empire at the time, and is typically divided into the Early Assyrian (c. 2600–2025 BC), Old Assyrian (c. 2025–1364 BC), Middle Assyrian (c. 1363–912 BC), Neo-Assyrian (911–609 BC), and post-imperial (609 BC–c. 240 AD) periods. The Assyrian people survive to this day and continue to live and practice their culture in their ancient heartland and in the diaspora.

Assur, the first Assyrian capital, was founded c. 2600 BC, but there is no evidence that the city was independent until the collapse of the Third Dynasty of Ur, in the 21st century BC, when a line of independent kings starting with Puzur-Ashur I began ruling the city. Centered in the Assyrian heartland in northern Mesopotamia, Assyrian power fluctuated over time. The city underwent several periods of foreign rule or domination before Assyria rose under Ashur-uballit I in the early 14th century BC as the Middle Assyrian Empire. In the Middle and Neo-Assyrian periods, Assyria was one of the two major Mesopotamian kingdoms, alongside Babylonia in the south, and at times became the dominant power in the ancient Near East. Assyria was at its strongest in the Neo-Assyrian period, when the Assyrian army was the strongest military power in the world and the Assyrians ruled the largest empire then yet assembled in world history, spanning from parts of modern-day Iran in the east to Egypt in the west.

In the late 7th century BC the Neo-Assyrian Empire, weakened by a period of civil war, fell, conquered by a coalition of the ethno-linguistically similar Babylonians, who for some three centuries had lived under Assyrian rule or domination, and of Assyria's erstwhile vassals, the Medes and Scythians. Despite the Medo-Babylonian conquest of the Assyrian Empire ravaging much of Assyria's core urban areas, and the subsequent Neo-Babylonian Empire devoting minimal resources to reconstruction until the Assyrian-born Nabonidus took the throne, ancient Assyrian culture and traditions endured for centuries into the post-imperial era. Assyria revived during the Seleucid and Parthian periods, with several Assyrian kingdoms emerging under Parthian dominion from the 2nd century BC to the mid-3rd century AD. A later decline set in under the Sasanian Empire, which devastated many cities and semi-independent Assyrian territories in the region, among them Assur.

The remaining Assyrian people, who had survived and preserved their native culture in northern Mesopotamia, were among the first people to accept Christianity in the 1st century AD, traditionally having been evangelized by St. Thomas the Apostle, one of the Twelve Disciples of Jesus Christ, and by the disciples St. Addai and St. Mari, went on to develop a unique East Syriac rite and establish the Church of the East (which would go on to spread Christianity throughout large parts of Asia). The ancient Mesopotamian religion persisted at Assur until Assur's final sack in the 3rd century AD, and at certain other holdouts for centuries thereafter. A number of religious and cultural symbols, practices, customs, artistic styles, and genres from the ancient Mesopotamian religion and culture continue to be used and repurposed in Syriac Christianity to this day, such as the star of Shamash and the Easter Monday 'gayasa' (a play in the Sumerian disputation genre).

The triumph of ancient Assyria can be attributed not only to its vigorous warrior-monarchs but also to its adeptness in efficiently assimilating and governing conquered territories, using inventive and advanced administrative mechanisms. The developments in warfare and governance introduced by ancient Assyria continued to be employed by subsequent empires and states for centuries. Ancient Assyria also left a legacy of great cultural significance, particularly through the Neo-Assyrian Empire, making a prominent impression in later Assyrian, Greco-Roman, and Hebrew literary and religious traditions. (Note: See Neo-Assyrian Empire § Legacy)

== Nomenclature ==
In the Old Assyrian period, when Assyria was merely a city-state centered on the city of Assur, the state was typically referred to as ālu Aššur ("the city of Ashur"). From the time of its rise as a territorial state in the 14th century BC and onward, Assyria was referred to in official documents as māt Aššur ("the land of Ashur"), marking its shift to being a regional polity. The first attested use of the term māt Aššur is during the reign of Ashur-uballit I (c. 1363–1328 BC), who was the first king of the Middle Assyrian Empire. Both ālu Aššur and māt Aššur derive from the name of the Assyrian national deity Ashur. Ashur probably originated in the Early Assyrian period as a deified personification of Assur itself. In the Old Assyrian period the deity was considered the formal king of Assur; the actual rulers only used the style Išši'ak ("governor"). From the time of Assyria's rise as a territorial state, Ashur began to be regarded as an embodiment of the entire land ruled by the Assyrian kings.

The modern name "Assyria" is of Greek origin, derived from Ασσυρία (Assuría). The term's first attested use is during the time of the ancient Greek historian Herodotus (5th century BC). The Greeks called the Levant "Syria" and Mesopotamia "Assyria", even though the local population, both at that time and well into the later Christian period, used both terms interchangeably to refer to the entire region. It is not known whether the Greeks began referring to Mesopotamia as "Assyria" because they equated the region with the Assyrian Empire, long fallen by the time the term is first attested, or because they named the region after the people who lived there, the Assyrians. Because the term is so "similar to Syria", scholars have been examining since the 17th century whether the two terms are connected. Luwian and Aramaic texts from the Neo-Assyrian Empire era show that the shortened form "Syria" was used as a synonym for Assyria before Greek sources appeared; modern scholars generally agree the names are linked.

Both "Assyria" and the contraction, "Syria," are ultimately derived from the Akkadian Aššur. Following the decline of the Neo-Assyrian Empire, the subsequent empires that held dominion over the Assyrian lands adopted distinct appellations for the region, with a significant portion of these names also being rooted in Aššur. The Achaemenid Empire referred to Assyria as Aθūrā ("Athura"). The Sasanian Empire inexplicably referred to Lower Mesopotamia as Asoristan ("land of the Assyrians"), though the northern province of Nōdšīragān, which included much of the old Assyrian heartland, was also sometimes called Atūria or Āthōr. In Syriac, Assyria was and is referred to as ʾĀthor.

== History ==
=== Early history ===
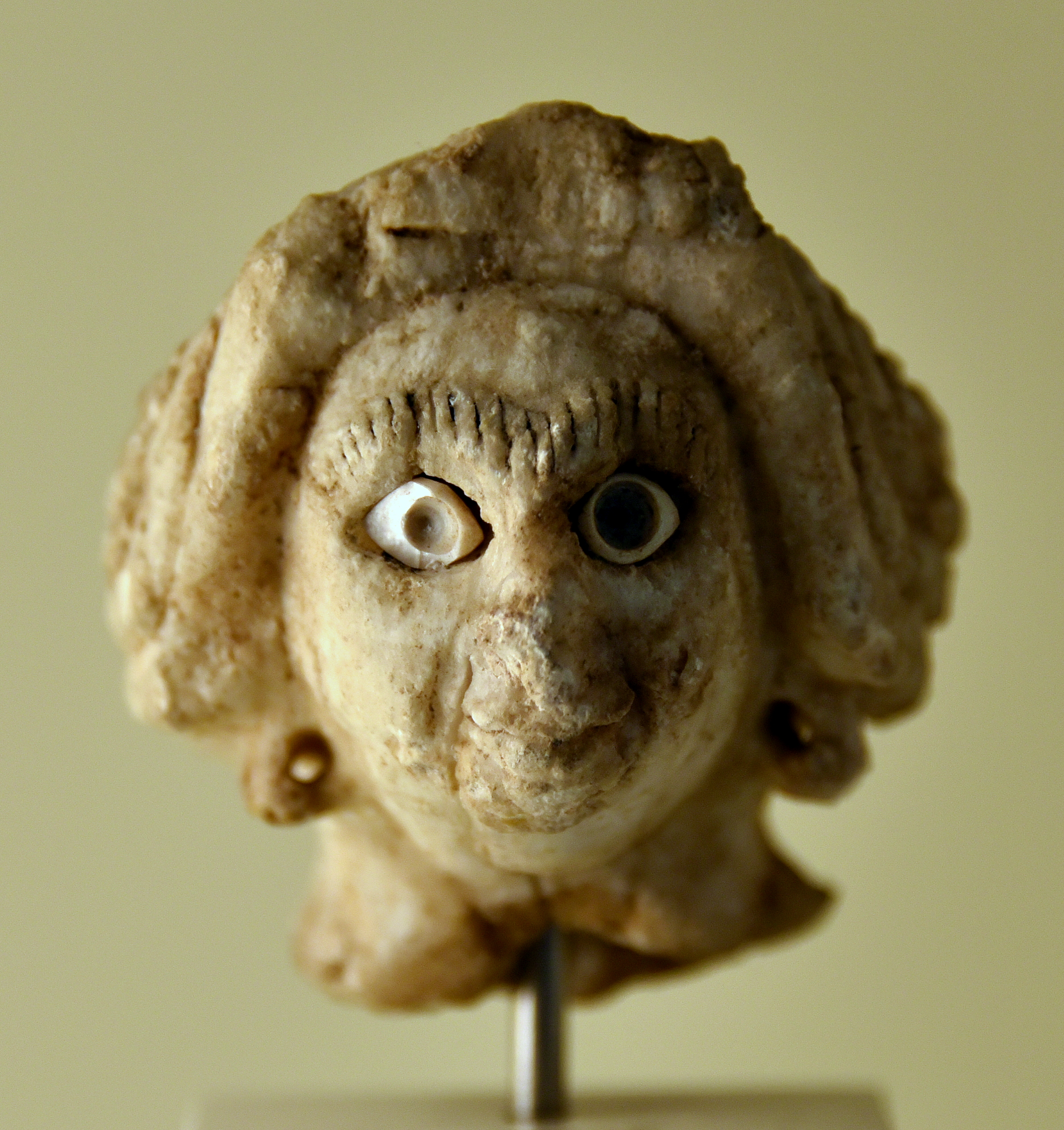
The head of a female statue, dating back to the Akkadian period (c. 2334–2154 BC). Found at Assur, display at the Pergamon Museum in Berlin.

Agricultural villages in the region that would later become Assyria are known to have existed by the time of the Hassuna culture, c. 6300–5800 BC. Though the sites of some nearby cities that would later be incorporated into the Assyrian heartland, such as Nineveh, are known to have been inhabited since the Neolithic, the earliest archaeological evidence from Assur dates to the Early Dynastic Period, c. 2600 BC. During this time, the surrounding region was already relatively urbanized. There is no evidence that early Assur was an independent settlement, and it might not have been called Assur at all initially, but rather Baltil or Baltila, used in later times to refer to the city's oldest portion.

The name "Assur" is first attested for the site in documents of the Akkadian period in the 24th century BC. Through most of the Early Assyrian period (c. 2600–2025 BC), Assur was dominated by states and polities from southern Mesopotamia. Early on, Assur for a time fell under the loose hegemony of the Sumerian city of Kish and it was later occupied by both the Akkadian Empire and then the Third Dynasty of Ur. In c. 2025 BC, due to the collapse of the Third Dynasty of Ur, Assur became an independent city-state under Puzur-Ashur I.

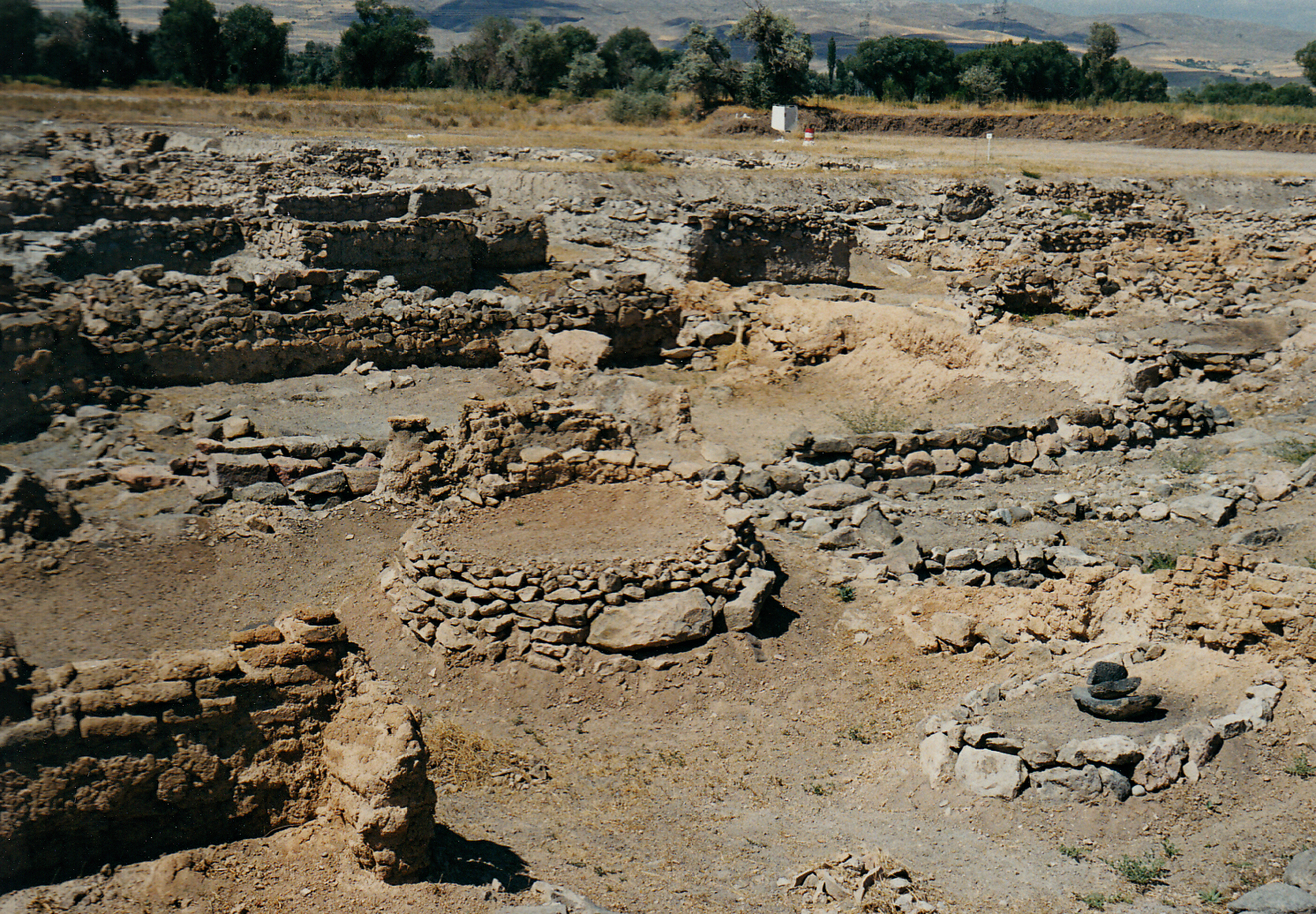
The ruins of the Old Assyrian trading colony at Kültepe

Under the Puzur-Ashur dynasty, Assur was home to less than 10,000 people and likely held very limited military power; no military institutions at all are known from this time and no political influence was exerted on neighboring cities. Assur retained influence in other respects; under Erishum I (r. c. 1974–1934 BC), the city undertook the earliest known experiment with free trade, assigning responsibility for trade and large‑scale foreign transactions to private individuals rather than the state.

Royal encouragement of trade led to Assur quickly establishing itself as a prominent trading city in northern Mesopotamia and soon thereafter establishing an extensive long-distance trade network, the first notable impression Assyria left in the historical record. The trade network is documented by extensive Old Assyrian cuneiform tablet collections from Assyrian trade colonies, most notably 22,000 tablets uncovered at Kültepe, near present-day Kayseri in Turkey.

As trade declined, perhaps due to increased warfare and conflict between the growing states of the Near East, Assur was frequently threatened by larger foreign states and kingdoms. The original Assur city-state, and the Puzur-Ashur dynasty, came to an end c. 1808 BC when the city was conquered by the Amorite ruler of Ekallatum, Shamshi-Adad I. Shamshi-Adad's extensive conquests in northern Mesopotamia eventually made him the ruler of the entire region, founding what some scholars have termed the "Kingdom of Upper Mesopotamia". The survival of this realm relied chiefly on Shamshi-Adad's own strength and charisma and thus collapsed shortly after his death c. 1776 BC.

After Shamshi-Adad's death, the political situation in northern Mesopotamia was highly volatile, with Assur at times coming under the brief control of Eshnunna, Elam and the Old Babylonian Empire. At some point, the city returned to being an independent city-state, though the politics of Assur itself were volatile as well, with fighting between members of Shamshi-Adad's dynasty, native Assyrians and Hurrians for control. The infighting came to an end after the rise of Bel-bani as king c. 1700 BC. Bel-bani founded the Adaside dynasty, which after his reign ruled Assyria for about a thousand years.

Assyria's rise as a territorial state in later times was in large part facilitated by two separate invasions of Mesopotamia by the Hittites. An invasion by the Hittite king Mursili I in c. 1595 BC destroyed the dominant Old Babylonian Empire, allowing the smaller kingdoms of Mitanni and Kassite Babylonia to rise in the north and south, respectively. Around c. 1430 BC, Assur was subjugated by Mitanni, an arrangement that lasted for about 70 years, until c. 1360 BC. Another Hittite invasion by Šuppiluliuma I in the 14th century BC effectively crippled the Mitanni kingdom. Following that invasion, Assyria broke free of its suzerain and regained independence under Ashur-uballit I (r. c. 1363–1328 BC); his accession and campaigns against nearby lands are traditionally seen as the start of the Middle Assyrian Empire (c. 1363–912 BC).

=== Assyrian Empire ===
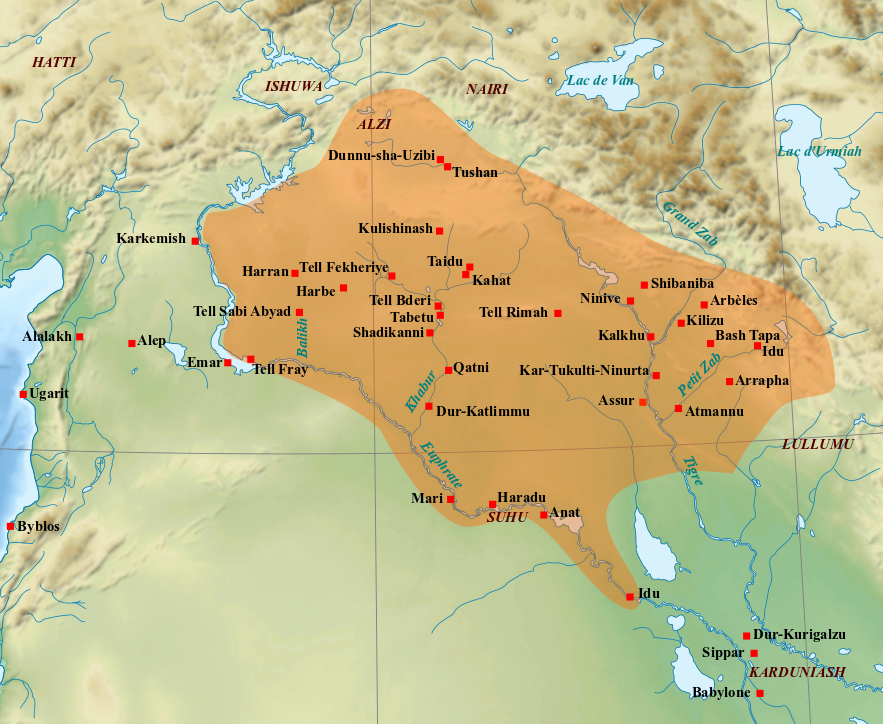
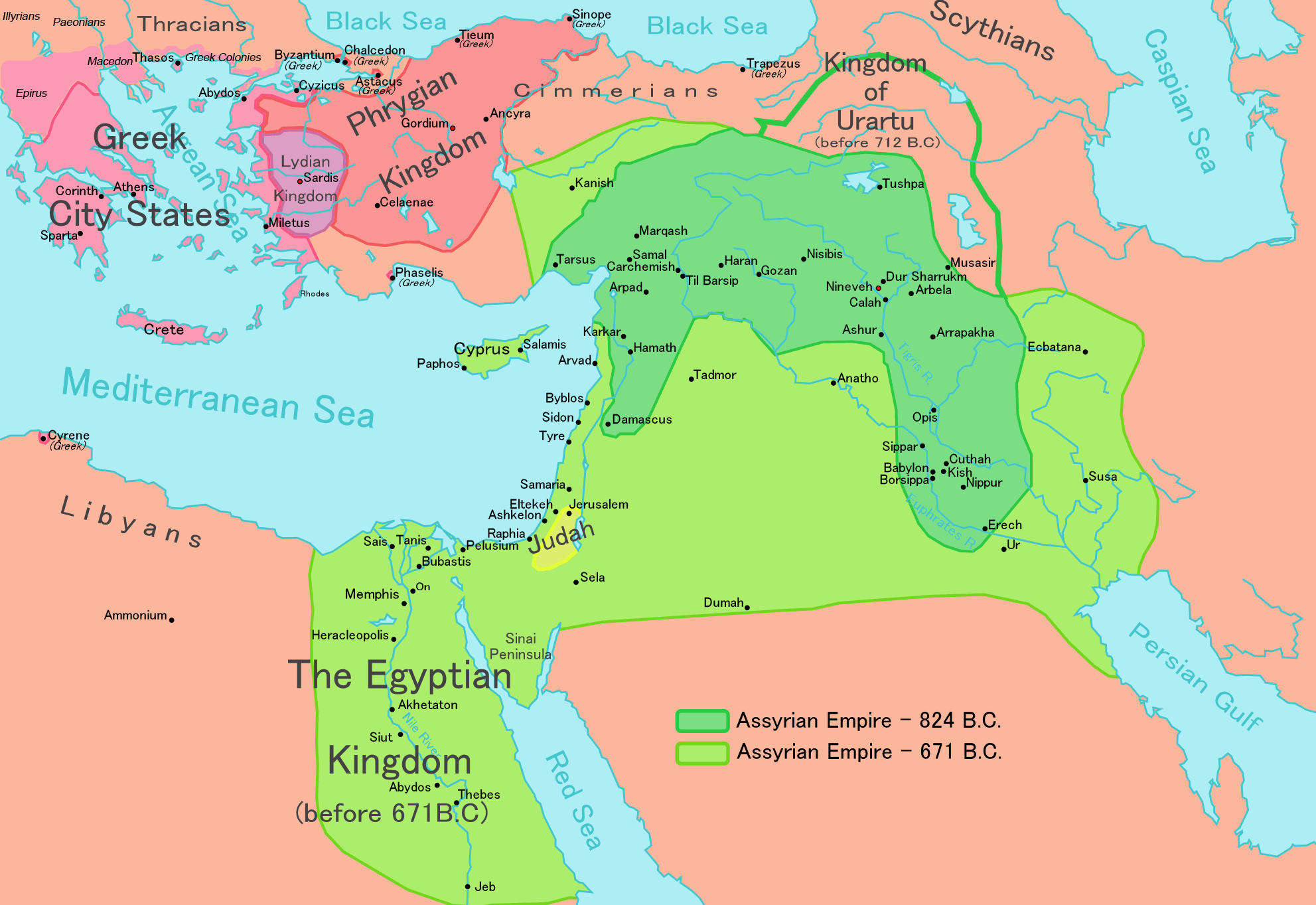
Maps of the borders of the Middle Assyrian Empire (left) and the Neo-Assyrian Empire (right) at their respective heights in the 13th and 7th centuries BC

Ashur-uballit I was the first native Assyrian ruler to claim the royal title šar ("king"). Shortly after achieving independence, he further claimed the dignity of a great king on the level of the Egyptian pharaohs and the Hittite kings. Assyria's rise was intertwined with the decline and fall of the Mitanni kingdom, its former suzerain, which allowed the early Middle Assyrian kings to expand and consolidate territories in northern Mesopotamia. Under the warrior-kings Adad-nirari I (r. c. 1305–1274 BC), Shalmaneser I (r. c. 1273–1244 BC) and Tukulti-Ninurta I (r. c. 1243–1207 BC), Assyria began to realize its aspirations of becoming a significant regional power.

These kings campaigned in all directions and incorporated a significant amount of territory into the growing Assyrian Empire. Under Shalmaneser I, the last remnants of the Mitanni kingdom were formally annexed into Assyria. The most successful of the Middle Assyrian kings was Tukulti-Ninurta I, who brought the Middle Assyrian Empire to its greatest extent. His most notable military achievements were his victory at the Battle of Nihriya c. 1237 BC, which marked the beginning of the end of Hittite influence in northern Mesopotamia, and his temporary conquest of Babylonia, which became an Assyrian vassal c. 1225–1216 BC. Tukulti-Ninurta was also the first Assyrian king to try to move the capital away from Assur, inaugurating the new city Kar-Tukulti-Ninurta as capital c. 1233 BC. The capital was returned to Assur after his death.

Tukulti-Ninurta I's assassination c. 1207 BC was followed by inter-dynastic conflict and a significant drop in Assyrian power. Tukulti-Ninurta I's successors were unable to maintain Assyrian power and Assyria became increasingly restricted to just the Assyrian heartland, a period of decline broadly coinciding with the Late Bronze Age collapse. Though some kings in this period of decline, such as Ashur-dan I (r. c. 1178–1133 BC), Ashur-resh-ishi I (r. 1132–1115 BC) and Tiglath-Pileser I (r. 1114–1076 BC) worked to reverse the decline and made significant conquests, their conquests were ephemeral and shaky, quickly lost again. From the time of Eriba-Adad II (r. 1056–1054 BC) onward, Assyrian decline intensified.

The Assyrian heartland remained safe due to its geographical remoteness. During these centuries, the decline of other states and fragmentation of lands around the Assyrian heartland allowed the revitalized Assyrian army to reconquer much of the empire with ease. Under Ashur-dan II (r. 934–912 BC), who campaigned in the northeast and northwest, Assyrian decline was at last reversed, paving the way for grander efforts under his successors. The end of his reign conventionally marks the beginning of the Neo-Assyrian Empire (911–609 BC).

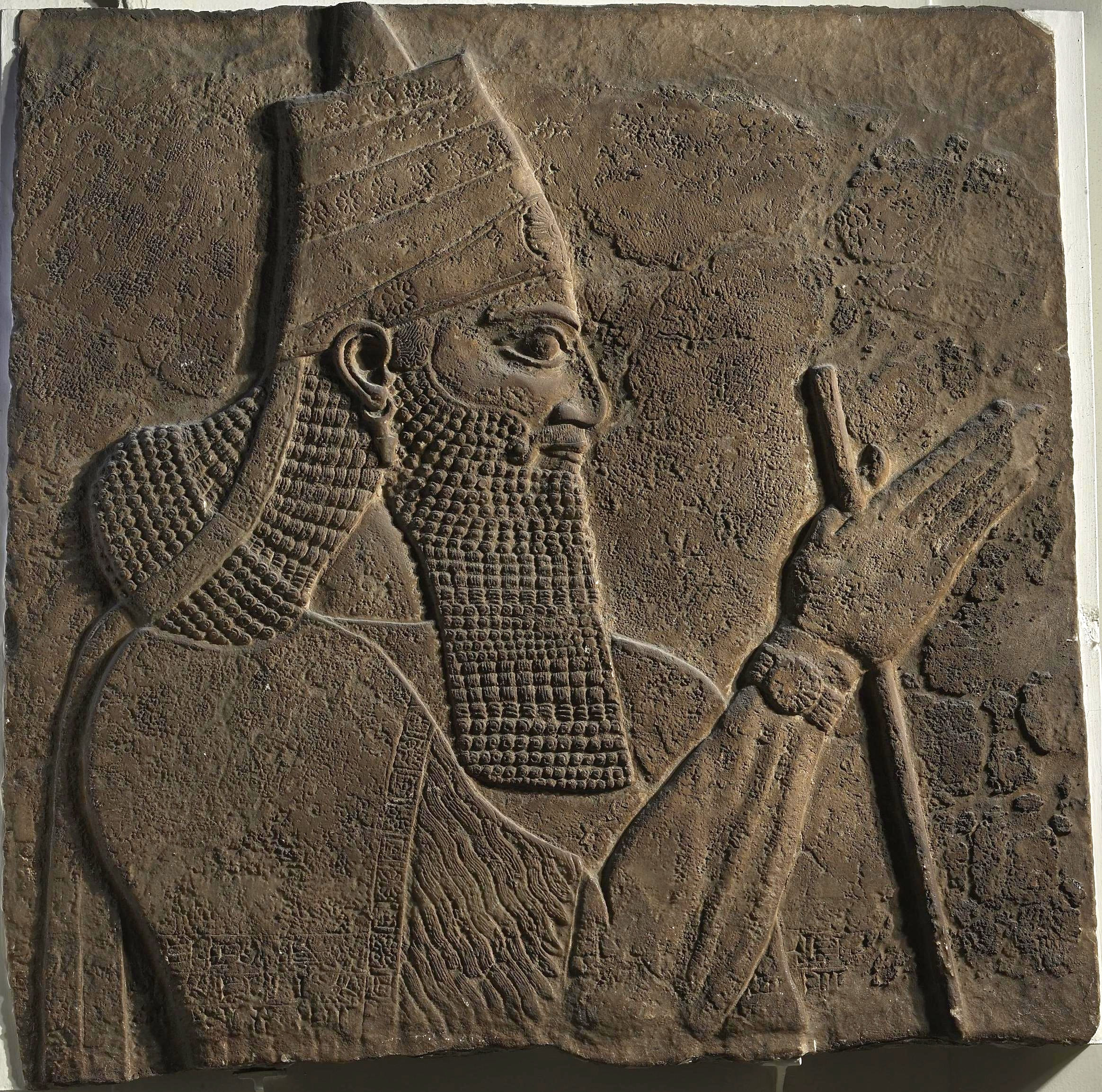
A partial relief of Tiglath-Pileser III, r. 745–727 BC, under whom the Neo-Assyrian Empire was consolidated, centralized and significantly expanded

Through decades of conquests, the early Neo-Assyrian kings worked to retake the lands of the Middle Assyrian Empire. Since this reconquista had to begin nearly from scratch, its eventual success was an extraordinary achievement. Under Ashurnasirpal II (r. 883–859 BC), the Neo-Assyrian Empire became the dominant political power in the Near East. In his ninth campaign, Ashurnasirpal II marched to the coast of the Mediterranean Sea, collecting tribute from various kingdoms on the way. A significant development during Ashurnasirpal II's reign was the second attempt to transfer the Assyrian capital away from Assur. Ashurnasirpal restored the ancient and ruined town of Nimrud, also located in the Assyrian heartland, and in 879 BC designated that city as the new capital of the empire. Though no longer the political capital, Assur remained the ceremonial and religious center of Assyria.

Ashurnasirpal II's son Shalmaneser III (r. 859–824 BC) also went on wide-ranging wars of conquest, expanding the empire in all directions. After Shalmaneser III's death, the Neo-Assyrian Empire entered into a period of stagnation dubbed the "age of the magnates", when powerful officials and generals were the principal wielders of political power rather than the king. This time of stagnation came to an end with the rise of Tiglath-Pileser III (r. 745–727 BC), who reduced the power of the magnates, consolidated and centralized the holdings of the empire, and through his military campaigns and conquests more than doubled the extent of Assyrian territory. The most significant conquests were the vassalization of the Levant all the way to the Egyptian border and the 729 BC conquest of Babylonia.

The Neo-Assyrian Empire reached the height of its extent and power under the Sargonid dynasty, founded by Sargon II (r. 722–705 BC). Under Sargon II and his son Sennacherib (r. 705–681 BC), the empire was further expanded and the gains were consolidated. Both kings founded new capitals. In 706 BC, Sargon II relocated the capital to the newly constructed city of Dur-Sharrukin. The following year, Sennacherib transferred the capital to Nineveh, which he extensively expanded and renovated. He may even have been responsible for the construction of the Hanging Gardens there—one of the Seven Wonders of the Ancient World. The 671 BC conquest of Egypt under Esarhaddon (r. 681–669 BC) brought Assyria to its greatest ever extent.

After the death of Ashurbanipal (r. 669–631 BC), the Neo-Assyrian Empire swiftly collapsed. One of the primary reasons was the inability of the Neo-Assyrian kings to resolve the "Babylonian problem"; despite many attempts to appease Babylonia in the south, revolts were frequent all throughout the Sargonid period. The revolt of Babylon under Nabopolassar in 626 BC, in combination with an invasion by the Medes under Cyaxares in 615/614 BC, led to the Medo-Babylonian conquest of the Assyrian Empire. Assur was sacked in 614 BC and Nineveh fell in 612 BC. The last Assyrian ruler, Ashur-uballit II, tried to rally the Assyrian army at Harran in the west but he was defeated in 609 BC, marking the end of the ancient line of Assyrian kings and of Assyria as a state.

=== Later history ===
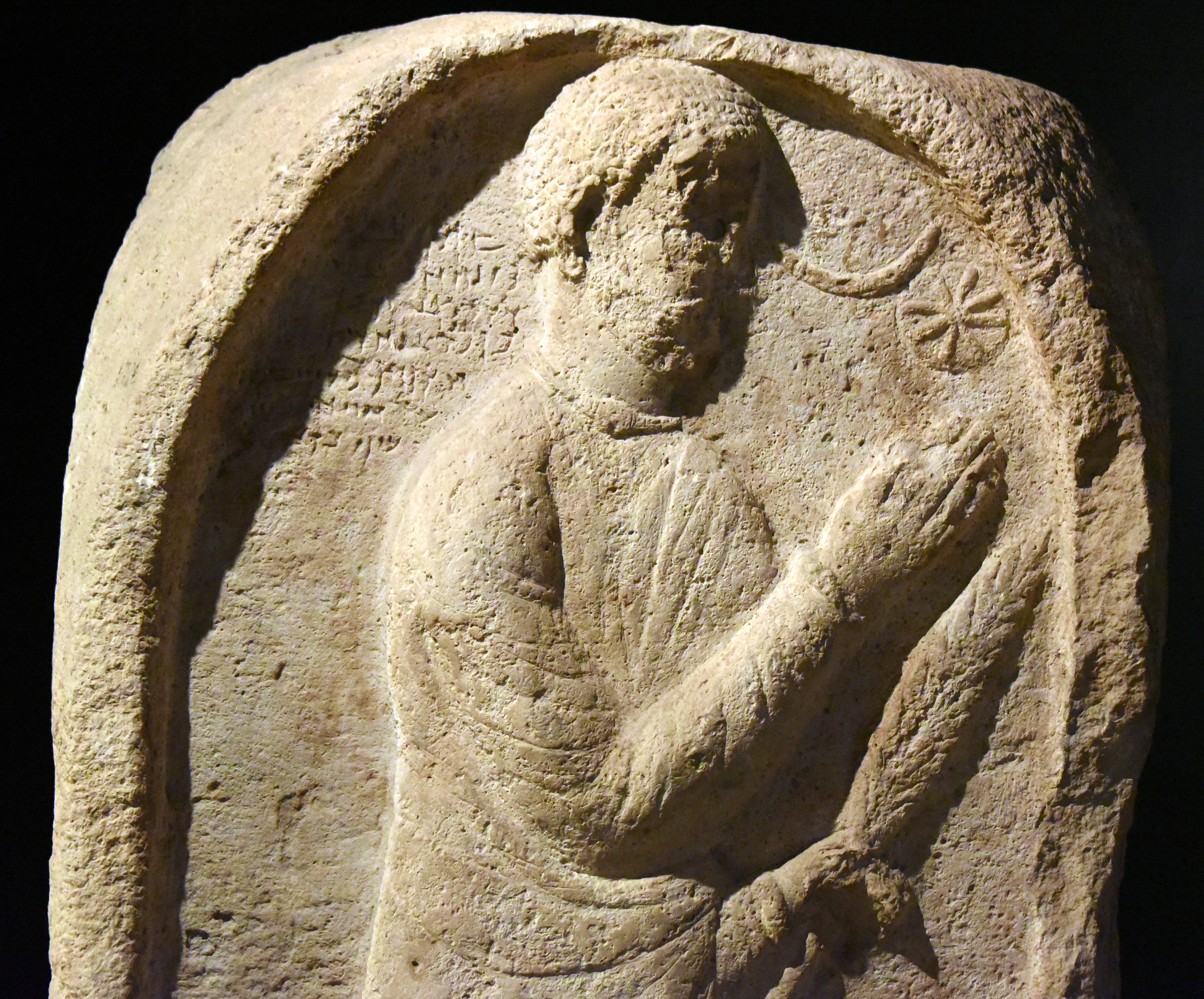
Detail of a stele in the style of the Neo-Assyrian royal steles, erected in Assur in the 2nd century AD under Parthian rule, by the local ruler Rʻuth-Assor

Despite the violent downfall of the Assyrian Empire, Assyrian culture continued to survive through the subsequent post-imperial period (609 BC – c. AD 240) and beyond. The Assyrian heartland experienced a dramatic decrease in the size and number of inhabited settlements during the rule of the Neo-Babylonian Empire founded by Nabopolassar; the former Assyrian capital cities Assur, Nimrud and Nineveh were nearly completely abandoned. Throughout the time of the Neo-Babylonian and later Achaemenid Empire, Assyria remained a marginal and sparsely populated region. Toward the end of the 6th century BC, the Assyrian dialect of the Akkadian language went extinct, having toward the end of the Neo-Assyrian Empire already largely been replaced by Aramaic as a vernacular language.

Under the empires succeeding the Neo-Babylonians, from the late 6th century BC onward, Assyria began to experience a recovery. Under the Achaemenids, most of the territory was organized into the province (Note: Though often referred to as a satrapy by modern historians, Assyria appears in Achaemenid royal inscriptions as a dahyu; a term of uncertain implications used to refer to both peoples and geographical locations (not necessarily synonymous with the formal satrapies of the empire).) Athura (Aθūrā). The organization into a single large province, the lack of interference of the Achaemenid rulers in local affairs, and the return of the cult statue of Ashur to Assur soon after the Achaemenids conquered Babylon facilitated the survival of Assyrian culture. Under the Seleucid Empire, which controlled Mesopotamia from the late 4th to mid-2nd century BC, Assyrian sites such as Assur, Nimrud and Nineveh were resettled, and a large number of villages were rebuilt and expanded.

After the Parthian Empire conquered the region in the 2nd century BC, the recovery of Assyria continued, culminating in an unprecedented return to prosperity and revival in the 1st to 3rd centuries AD. The region was resettled and restored so intensely that the population and settlement density reached heights not seen since the Neo-Assyrian Empire. The region was under the Parthians primarily ruled by a group of vassal kingdoms, including Osroene, Adiabene and Hatra. Though in some aspects influenced by Assyrian culture, these states were for the most part not ruled by Assyrian rulers.

Assur itself flourished under Parthian rule. From around or shortly after the end of the 2nd century BC, the city may have become the capital of its own small semi-autonomous Assyrian realm, either under the suzerainty of Hatra, or under direct Parthian suzerainty. On account of the resemblance between the stelae by the local rulers and those of the ancient Assyrian kings, they may have seen themselves as the restorers and continuators of the old royal line. The ancient Ashur temple was restored in the 2nd century AD. This last cultural golden age came to an end with the sack of Assur by the Sasanian Empire c. 240. During the sack, the Ashur temple was destroyed again and the city's population was dispersed.

Starting from the 1st century AD onward, many of the Assyrians became Christianized, though holdouts of the old ancient Mesopotamian religion continued to survive for centuries. After losing political power, Assyrians continued to form a significant portion of northern Mesopotamia's population until religiously motivated suppression and massacres under the Ilkhanate and Timurid Empire in the 14th century turned them into a local ethnic and religious minority. The Assyrians lived largely in peace under the rule of the Ottoman Empire, which gained control of Assyria in the 16th century.

In the late 19th and early 20th century, when the Ottomans grew increasingly nationalistic, further persecutions and massacres were enacted against the Assyrians, most notably the Sayfo (Assyrian genocide), which resulted in the deaths of as many as 250,000 Assyrians. (Note: The precise number is far from certain since the massacres were poorly documented by the Ottoman government. The Assyrian population prior to the genocide amounted to about 500,000–600,000 people and the generally accepted estimate is that about 50 % of the Assyrian people were killed.) Throughout the 20th century, many unsuccessful proposals have been made by the Assyrians for autonomy or independence. Further massacres and persecutions, enacted both by governments and by terrorist groups such as the Islamic State, have resulted in most of the Assyrian people living in diaspora.

== Government and military ==
=== Kingship ===
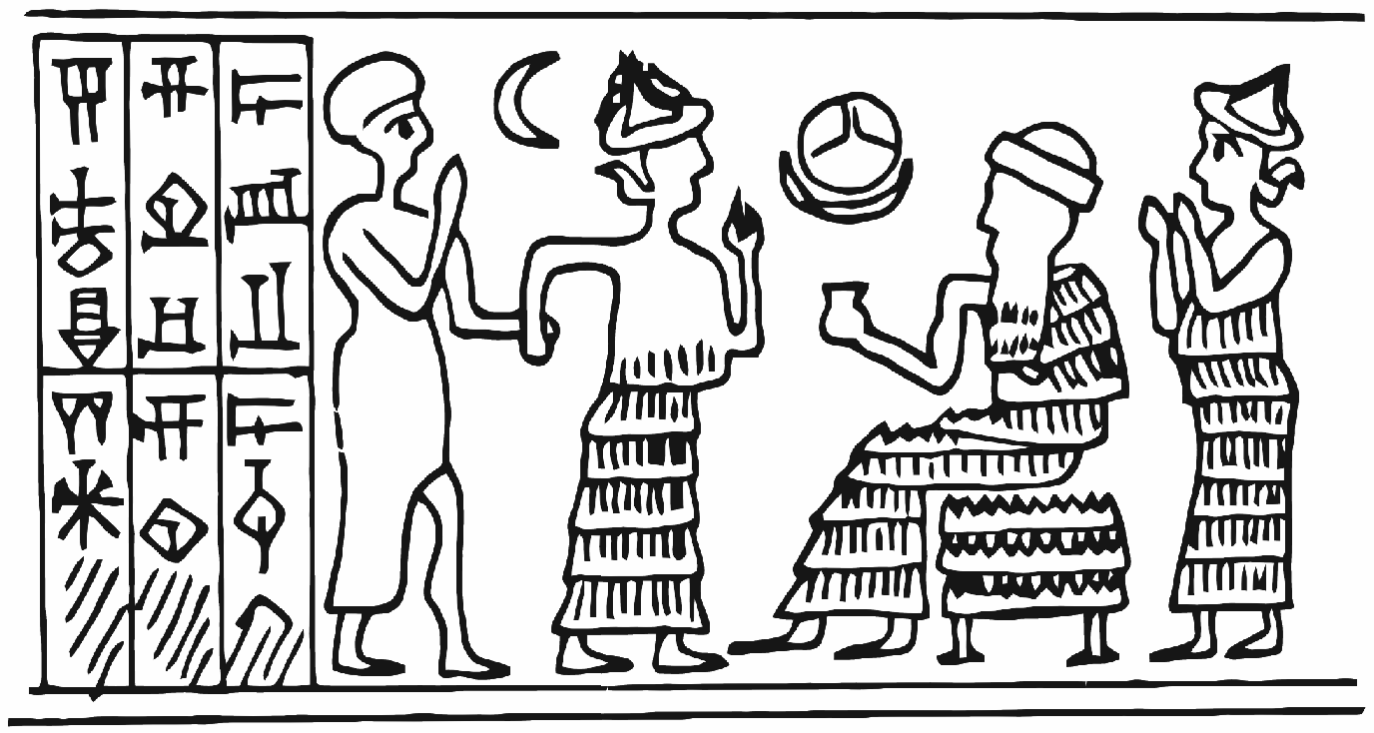
A line-drawing of a royal seal of the Old Assyrian king Erishum I, r. c. 1974–1934 BC. The seated ruler is thought to represent the god Ashur, with Erishum being the bald figure being led toward him.

In the Assur city-state of the Old Assyrian period, the government was in many respects an oligarchy, where the king was a permanent, albeit not the only prominent, actor. The Old Assyrian kings were not autocrats, with sole power, but rather acted as stewards on behalf of the god Ashur and presided over the meetings of the city assembly, the main Assyrian administrative body during this time. The composition of the city assembly is not known, but it is generally believed to have been made up of members of the most powerful families of the city, many of whom were merchants.

The king acted as the main executive officer and chairman of this group of influential individuals and also contributed with legal knowledge and expertise. The Old Assyrian kings were styled as iššiak Aššur ("governor [on behalf] of Ashur"), with Ashur being considered the city's formal king. In the Old Assyrian period, Assur's inhabitants commonly called the king rubā’um ("great one"), showing that, although their executive authority was limited, the kings were regarded as royal figures and as primus inter pares among the city's elite.

Assur first experienced a more autocratic form of kingship under the Amorite conqueror Shamshi-Adad I, the earliest ruler of Assur to use the style šarrum (king) and the title 'king of the Universe'. Shamshi-Adad I appears to have based his more absolute form of kingship on the rulers of the Old Babylonian Empire. Under Shamshi-Adad I, Assyrians also swore their oaths by the king, not just by the god. This practice did not survive beyond his death. The influence of the city assembly had disappeared by the beginning of the Middle Assyrian period. Though the traditional iššiak Aššur continued to be used at times, the Middle Assyrian kings were autocrats, in terms of power having little in common with the rulers of the Old Assyrian period.

As the Assyrian Empire grew, the kings began to employ an increasingly sophisticated array of royal titles. Ashur-uballit I was the first to assume the style šar māt Aššur ("king of the land of Ashur") and his grandson Arik-den-ili (r. c. 1317–1306 BC) introduced the style šarru dannu ("strong king"). Adad-nirari I's inscriptions required 32 lines to be devoted just to his titles. This development peaked under Tukulti-Ninurta I, who assumed, among other titles, the styles "king of Assyria and Karduniash", "king of Sumer and Akkad", "king of the Upper and the Lower Seas" and "king of all peoples". Royal titles and epithets mirrored political developments and individual kings' achievements, simplifying in decline and growing grander as Assyrian power revived.

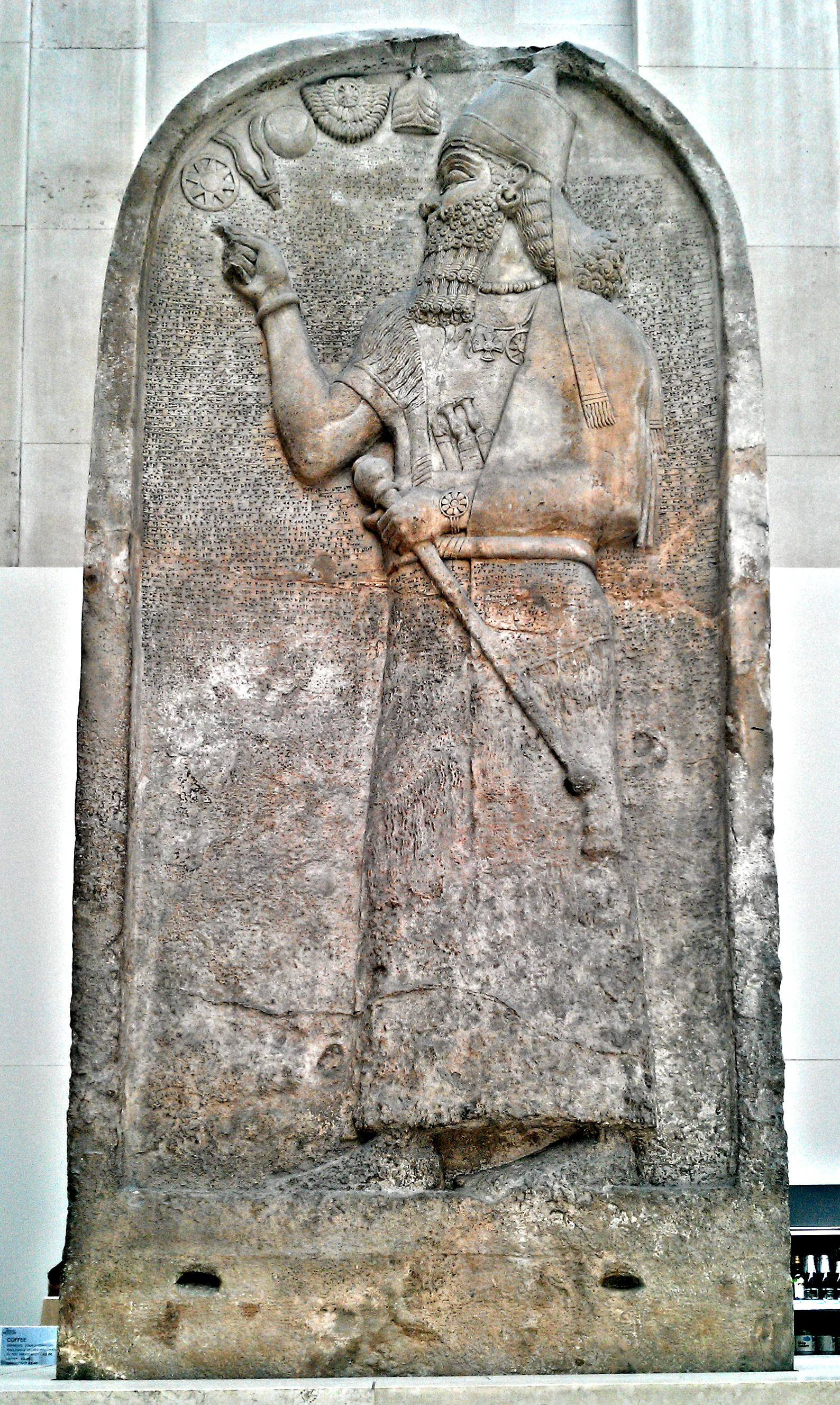
A stele of the Neo-Assyrian king Ashurnasirpal II, r. 883–859 BC

The kings of the Middle and Neo-Assyrian periods continued to present themselves, and be viewed by their subjects, as the intermediaries between Ashur and mankind. This position and role was used to justify imperial expansion: the Assyrians saw their empire as being the part of the world overseen and administered by Ashur through his human agents. In their ideology, the outer realm outside of Assyria was characterized by chaos and the people there were uncivilized, with unfamiliar cultural practices and strange languages. The existence of the "outer realm" was seen as threatening Assyria's cosmic order, compelling the king to expand the land of Ashur and incorporate these strange lands, turning chaos into civilization.

Texts describing the coronation of Middle and Neo-Assyrian kings at times include Ashur commanding the king to "broaden the land of Ashur" or "extend the land at his feet". As such, expansion was cast as a moral and necessary duty. Because the rule and actions of the Assyrian king were seen as divinely sanctioned, resistance to Assyrian sovereignty in times of war was regarded to be resistance against divine will, which deserved punishment. Peoples and polities who revolted against Assyria were seen as criminals against the divine world order. Since Ashur was the king of the gods, all other gods were subjected to him and thus the people who followed those gods should be subjected to the representative of Ashur, the Assyrian king.

The kings also had religious and judicial duties. Kings were responsible for performing various rituals in support of the cult of Ashur and the Assyrian priesthood. They were expected, together with the Assyrian people, to provide offerings to not only Ashur but also all the other gods. From the time of Ashur-resh-ishi I onward, the religious and cultic duties of the king were pushed somewhat into the background, though they were still prominently mentioned in accounts of building and restoring temples. Assyrian titles and epithets in inscriptions from then on generally emphasized the kings as powerful warriors. Middle and Neo-Assyrian kings inherited supreme judicial authority from the Old Assyrian period, though they generally showed less concern for judging than their predecessors. The kings were expected to ensure the welfare and prosperity of the Assyria and its people, indicated by multiple inscriptions referring to the kings as "shepherds" (re’û).

=== Capital cities ===
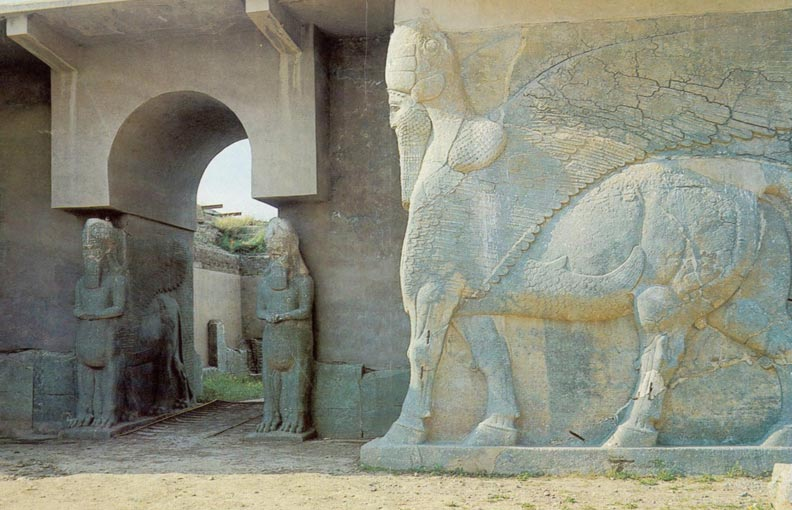
Ruins of one of the entrances of the Northwest Palace at Nimrud, the Assyrian capital 879–706 BC, destroyed by the Islamic State in 2015

No word for the idea of a capital city existed in Akkadian, the nearest being the idea of a "city of kingship", i.e. an administrative center used by the king, but there are several examples of kingdoms having multiple "cities of kingship". Due to Assyria growing out of the Assur city-state of the Old Assyrian period, and due to the city's religious importance, Assur was the administrative center of Assyria through most of its history. Though the royal administration at times moved elsewhere, the ideological status of Assur was never fully superseded and it remained a ceremonial center in the empire even when it was governed from elsewhere. The transfer of the royal seat of power to other cities was ideologically possible since the king was Ashur's representative on Earth. The king, like the deity embodied Assyria itself, and so the capital of Assyria was in a sense wherever the king happened to have his residence.

The first transfer of administrative power away from Assur occurred under Tukulti-Ninurta I, who c. 1233 BC inaugurated Kar-Tukulti-Ninurta as capital. Tukulti-Ninurta I's foundation of a new capital was perhaps inspired by developments in Babylonia in the south, where the Kassite dynasty had transferred the administration from the long-established city of Babylon to the newly constructed city of Dur-Kurigalzu, also named after a king. It seems that Tukulti-Ninurta I intended to go further than the Kassites and also establish Kar-Tukulti-Ninurta as the new Assyrian cult center. The city was however not maintained as capital after Tukulti-Ninurta I's death, with subsequent kings once more ruling from Assur.

A map of the capital cities of ancient Assyria

The Neo-Assyrian Empire underwent several different capitals. There is some evidence that Tukulti-Ninurta II (r. 890–884 BC), perhaps inspired by his predecessor of the same name, made unfulfilled plans to transfer the capital to a city called Nemid Tukulti-Ninurta, either a completely new city or a new name applied to Nineveh, which by this point already rivalled Assur in scale and political importance. The capital was transferred under Tukulti-Ninurta II's son Ashurnasirpal II to Nimrud in 879 BC. An architectural detail separating Nimrud and the other Neo-Assyrian capitals from Assur is that they were designed in a way that emphasized royal power: the royal palaces in Assur were smaller than the temples but the situation was reversed in the new capitals.

In 706 BC, Sargon II transferred the capital to the city of Dur-Sharrukin, which he built himself. Since the location of Dur-Sharrukin had no obvious practical or political merit, this move was probably an ideological statement. Immediately after Sargon II's death in 705 BC, his son Sennacherib transferred the capital to Nineveh, a far more natural seat of power. Though it was not meant as a permanent royal residence, Ashur-uballit II chose Harran as his seat of power after the fall of Nineveh in 612 BC. Harran is typically seen as the short-lived final Assyrian capital. No building projects were conducted during this time, but Harran had been long-established as a major religious center, dedicated to the god Sîn.

=== Aristocracy and elite ===
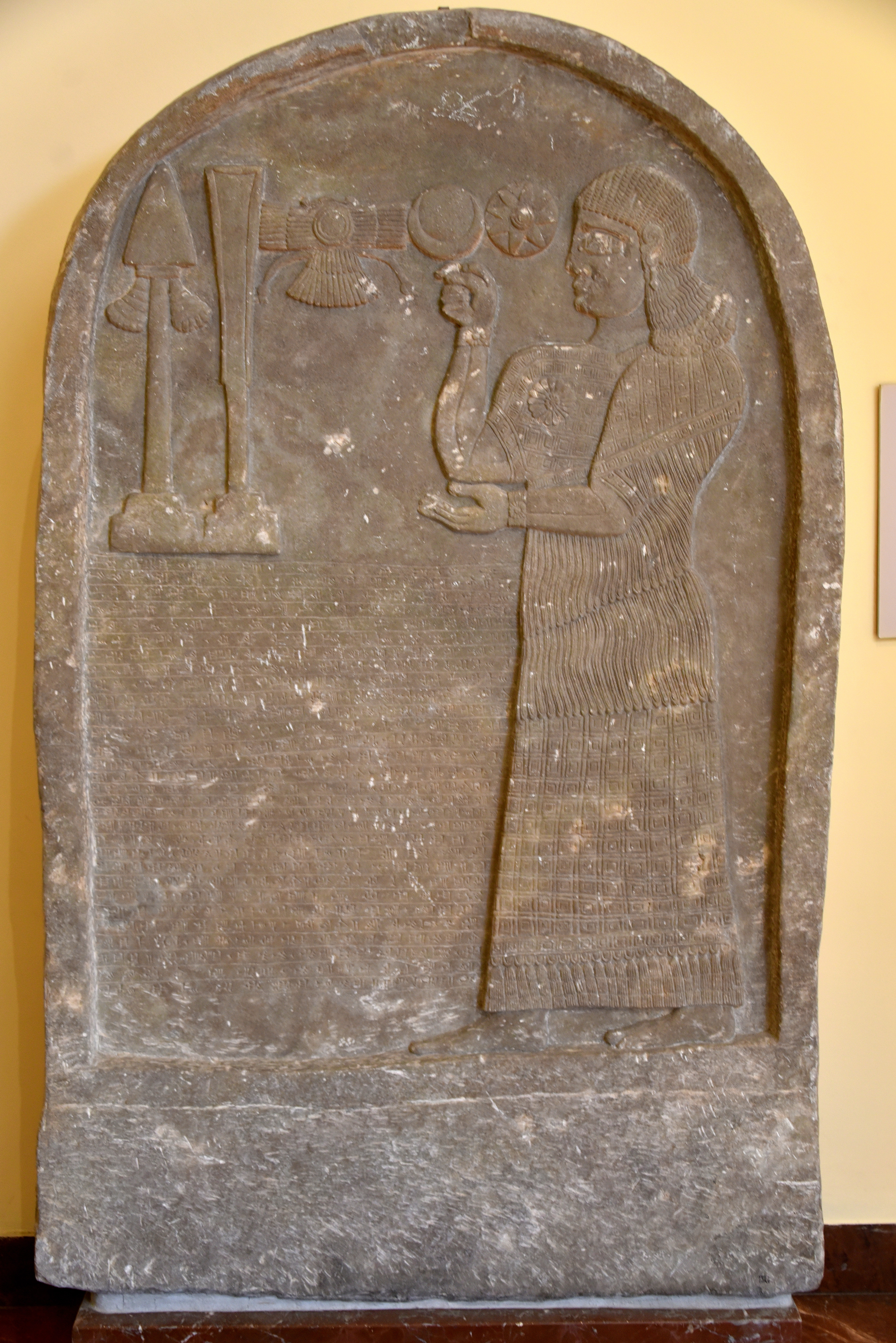
Stele of Bel-harran-beli-usur, a palace herald, made in the reign of the Neo-Assyrian king Shalmaneser IV (r. 783–773 BC)

Because of the nature of source preservation, more information about the upper classes of ancient Assyria survives than for the lower ones. At the top of Middle and Neo-Assyrian society were members of long-established and large families called "houses". Members of this aristocracy tended to occupy the most important offices within the government and they were likely descendants of the most prominent families of the Old Assyrian period.

One of the most influential offices in the Assyrian administration was the position of vizier (sukkallu). From at least the time of Shalmaneser I onward, there were grand viziers (sukkallu rabi’u), superior to the ordinary viziers, who at times governed their own lands as appointees of the kings. At least in the Middle Assyrian period, the grand viziers were typically members of the royal family and the position was at this time, as were many other offices, hereditary.

The elite of the Neo-Assyrian Empire was expanded and included several different offices. The Neo-Assyrian inner elite is typically divided by modern scholars into the "magnates", a set of high-ranking offices, and the "scholars" (ummânī), tasked with advising and guiding the kings through interpreting omens. The magnates included the offices masennu (treasurer), nāgir ekalli (palace herald), rab šāqê (chief cupbearer), rab ša-rēši (chief officer/eunuch), sartinnu (chief judge), sukkallu (grand vizier) and turtanu (commander-in-chief), which at times continued to be occupied by royal family members.

Some of the magnates acted as governors of important provinces and all of them were deeply involved with the Assyrian military, controlling significant forces. They owned large tax-free estates, scattered throughout the empire. In the late Neo-Assyrian Empire, there was a growing disconnect between the traditional Assyrian elite and the kings due to eunuchs growing unprecedently powerful. The highest offices both in the civil administration and the army began to be occupied by eunuchs with deliberately obscure and lowly origins, since this ensured that they would be loyal to the king. Eunuchs were trusted, since they were believed incapable of having any dynastic aspirations of their own.

From the time of Erishum I in the early Old Assyrian period onward, a yearly office-holder, a limmu official, was elected from the influential men of Assyria. The limmu official gave their name to the year, meaning that their name appeared in all administrative documents signed that year. Kings were typically the limmu officials in their first regnal years. In the Old Assyrian period, the limmu officials also held substantial executive power, though this aspect of the office had disappeared by the time of the rise of the Middle Assyrian Empire.

=== Administration ===
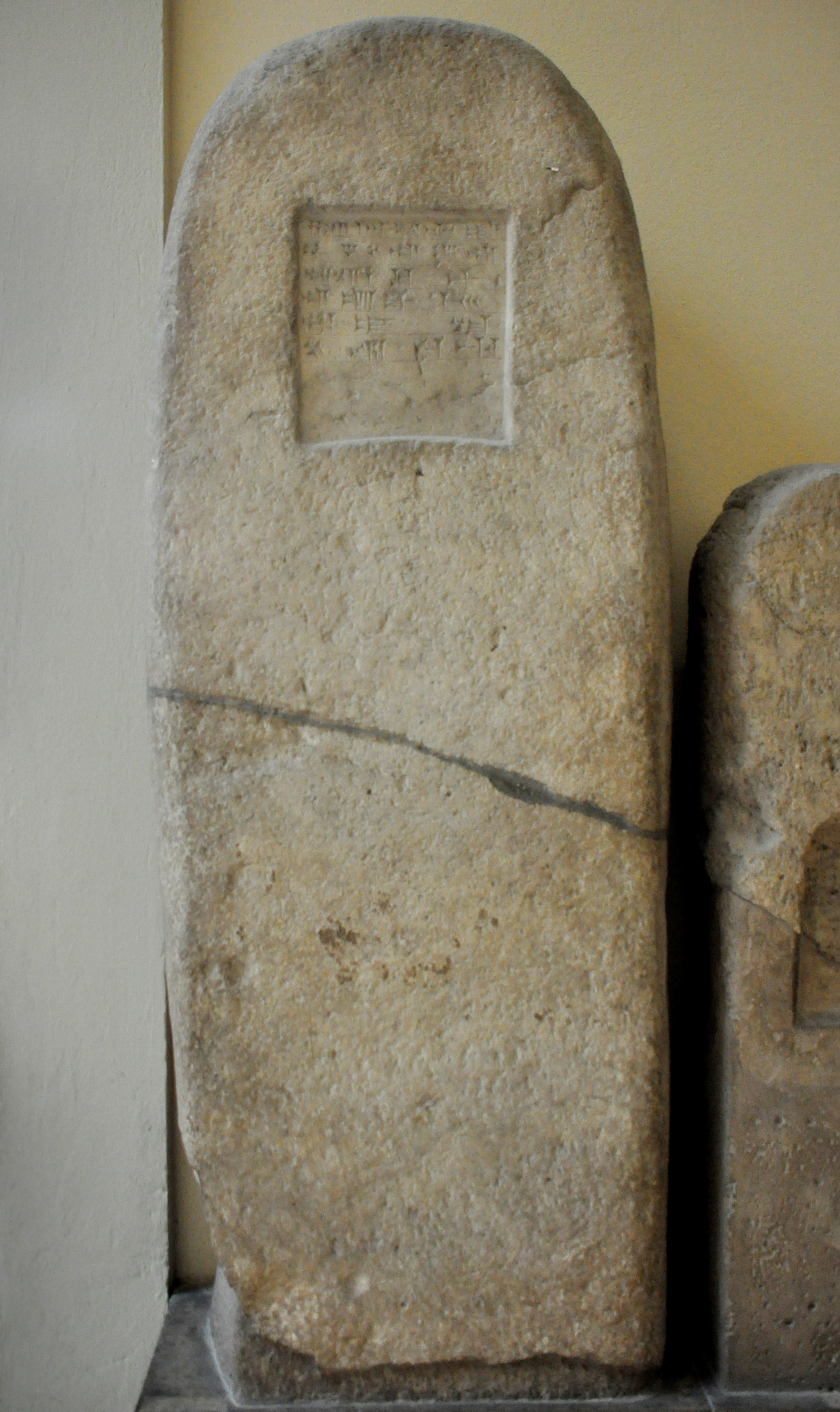
A stele of Ili-ittija, governor of Libbi-ali, Kar-Tukulti-Ninurta, Ekallatum, Itu, and Ruqahu, c. 804 BC

The success of Assyria was not only due to energetic kings who expanded its borders but more importantly due to its ability to efficiently incorporate and govern conquered lands. From the rise of Assyria as a territorial state at the beginning of the Middle Assyrian period onward, Assyrian territory was divided into a set of provinces or districts (pāḫutu). The total number and size of these provinces varied and changed as Assyria expanded and contracted. Every province was headed by a provincial governor (bel pāḫete, bēl pīhāti or šaknu) who was responsible for handling local order, public safety and economy.

Governors stored and distributed the goods produced in their province, which were inspected and collected by royal representatives once a year. Through these inspections, the central government could keep track of current stocks and production throughout the country. Governors had to pay both taxes and offer gifts to the god Ashur, though such gifts were usually small and mainly symbolic. The channeling of taxes and gifts were a method of collecting profit and served to connect the elite of the entire empire to the Assyrian heartland.

In the Neo-Assyrian period, an extensive hierarchy within the provincial administration is attested. At the bottom of this hierarchy were lower officials, such as village managers (rab ālāni) who oversaw one or more villages, collecting taxes in the form of labor and goods and keeping the administration informed of the conditions of their settlements, and corvée officers (ša bēt-kūdini) who kept tallies on the labor performed by forced laborers and the remaining time owed. Individual cities had their own administrations, headed by mayors (ḫazi’ānu), responsible for the local economy and production.

Some regions of the Assyrian Empire were not incorporated into the provincial system but were still subjected to the rule of the Assyrian kings. Such vassal states could be ruled indirectly through allowing established local lines of kings to continue ruling in exchange for tribute or through the Assyrian kings appointing their own vassal rulers. Through the ilku system, the Assyrian kings could also grant arable lands to individuals in exchange for goods and military service.

To overcome the challenges of governing a large empire, the Neo-Assyrian Empire developed a sophisticated state communication system, which included various innovative techniques and relay stations. Per estimates by Karen Radner, an official message sent in the Neo-Assyrian period from the western border province Quwê to the Assyrian heartland, a distance of 700 kilometers (430 miles) over a stretch of lands featuring many rivers without any bridges, could take less than five days to arrive. Such communication speed was unprecedented before the rise of the Neo-Assyrian Empire and was not surpassed in the Middle East until the telegraph was introduced by the Ottoman Empire in 1865, nearly two and a half thousand years after the Neo-Assyrian Empire's fall.

=== Military ===
A 20th-century illustration of a Neo-Assyrian spearman

The Assyrian army was throughout its history mostly composed of levies, mobilized only when they were needed (such as in the time of campaigns). Through regulations, obligations and sophisticated government systems, large amounts of soldiers could be recruited and mobilized already in the early Middle Assyrian period. A small central standing army unit was established in the Neo-Assyrian Empire, dubbed the kiṣir šarri ("king's unit"). Some professional, though not standing, troops are also attested in the Middle Assyrian period, dubbed ḫurādu or ṣābū ḫurādātu, though what their role was is not clear due to the scarcity of sources. Perhaps this category included archers and charioteers, who needed more extensive training than normal foot soldiers.

The Assyrian army developed and evolved over time. In the Middle Assyrian period, foot soldiers were divided into the sạ bū ša kakkē ("weapon troops") and the sạ bū ša arâtē ("shield-bearing troops") but surviving records are not detailed enough to determine what the differences were. It is possible that the sạ bū ša kakkē included ranged troops, such as slingers (ṣābū ša ušpe) and archers (ṣābū ša qalte). The chariots in the army composed a unit of their own. Based on surviving depictions, chariots were crewed by two soldiers: an archer who commanded the chariot (māru damqu) and a driver (ša mugerre). Chariots first entered extensive military use under Tiglath-Pileser I in the 12th–11th centuries BC and were in the later Neo-Assyrian period gradually phased out in favor of cavalry (ša petḫalle). In the Middle Assyrian period, cavalry was mainly used for escorting or message deliveries.

Under the Neo-Assyrian Empire, important new developments in the military were the large-scale introduction of cavalry, the adoption of iron for armor and weapons, and the development of new and innovative siege warfare techniques. At the height of the Neo-Assyrian Empire, the Assyrian army was the strongest army yet assembled in world history. The number of soldiers in the Neo-Assyrian army was likely several hundred thousand. The Neo-Assyrian army was subdivided into kiṣru, composed of perhaps 1,000 soldiers, most of whom would have been infantry soldiers (zūk, zukkû or raksūte). The infantry was divided into three types: light, medium and heavy, with varying weapons, level of armor and responsibilities. While on campaign, the Assyrian army made heavy use of both interpreters/translators (targumannu) and guides (rādi kibsi), both probably being drawn from foreigners resettled in Assyra.

== Population and society ==
=== Population and social standing ===
==== Populace ====
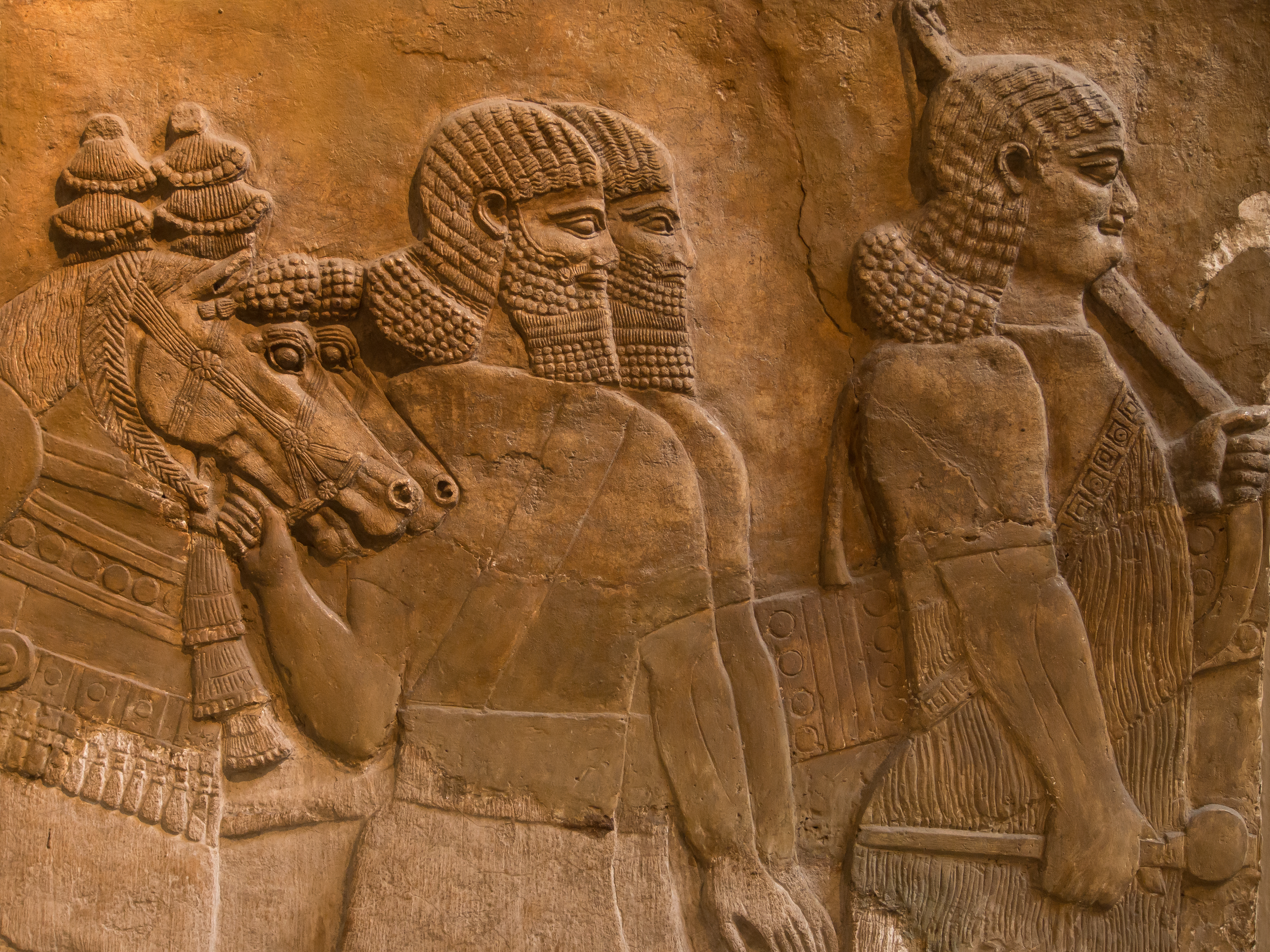
A neo-Assyrian relief of Assyrians in a procession

The majority of the population of ancient Assyria were farmers who worked land owned by their families. Old Assyrian society was divided into two main groups: slaves (subrum) and free citizens, referred to as awīlum ("men") or DUMU Aššur ("sons of Ashur"). Among the free citizens there was also a division into rabi ("big") and ṣaher ("small") members of the city assembly. Assyrian society grew more complex and hierarchical over time. In the Middle Assyrian Empire, the lower classes comprised multiple groups, the highest being the free men (a’ılū); although they, like the upper classes, were granted land for state service, the plots were too small for habitation.

Below the free men were the unfree men (šiluhlu̮). The unfree men had given up their freedom and entered the services of others on their own accord, and were provided with clothes and rations. Many of them probably originated as foreigners. Though similar to slavery, it was possible for an unfree person to regain their freedom by providing a replacement. During their service they were considered the property of the government rather than their employers. Other lower classes of the Middle Assyrian period included the ālāyû ("village residents"), ālik ilke (people recruited through the ilku system) and the hupšu, though what these designations meant in terms of social standing and living standards is not known.

The Middle Assyrian structure of society by and large endured through the subsequent Neo-Assyrian period. Below the higher classes of Neo-Assyrian society were free citizens, semi-free laborers and slaves. It was possible through steady service to the Assyrian state bureaucracy for a family to move up the social ladder. In some cases, stellar work conducted by a single individual enhanced the status of their family for generations to come. In many cases, Assyrian family groups, or "clans", formed large population groups within the empire, referred to as tribes. Such tribes lived together in villages and other settlements near or adjacent to their agricultural lands.

Slavery was an intrinsic part of nearly every society in the ancient Near East. There were two main types of slaves in ancient Assyria: chattel slaves, primarily foreigners who were kidnapped or who were spoils of war, and debt slaves, formerly free men and women who had been unable to pay off their debts. In some cases, Assyrian children were seized by authorities due to the debts of their parents and sold off into slavery when their parents were unable to pay. Children born to slave women automatically became slaves themselves, unless some other arrangement had been agreed to. Old Babylonian texts often note the geographic and ethnic origins of slaves, whereas Old Assyrian texts do so only once, referring to a slave girl as Subaraean; many other texts mention slaves without such detail. This suggests ethnicity was not considered important in slavery.

The surviving evidence suggests that the number of slaves in Assyria never reached a large share of the population. In the Akkadian language, several terms were used for slaves, commonly wardum, though this term could confusingly also be used for (free) official servants, retainers and followers, soldiers and subjects of the king. Assyrian texts often describe wardum individuals managing property and performing administrative duties for their masters, indicating they may have been free servants rather than slaves in the usual sense. A number of wardum are also recorded as being bought and sold.

==== Status of women ====
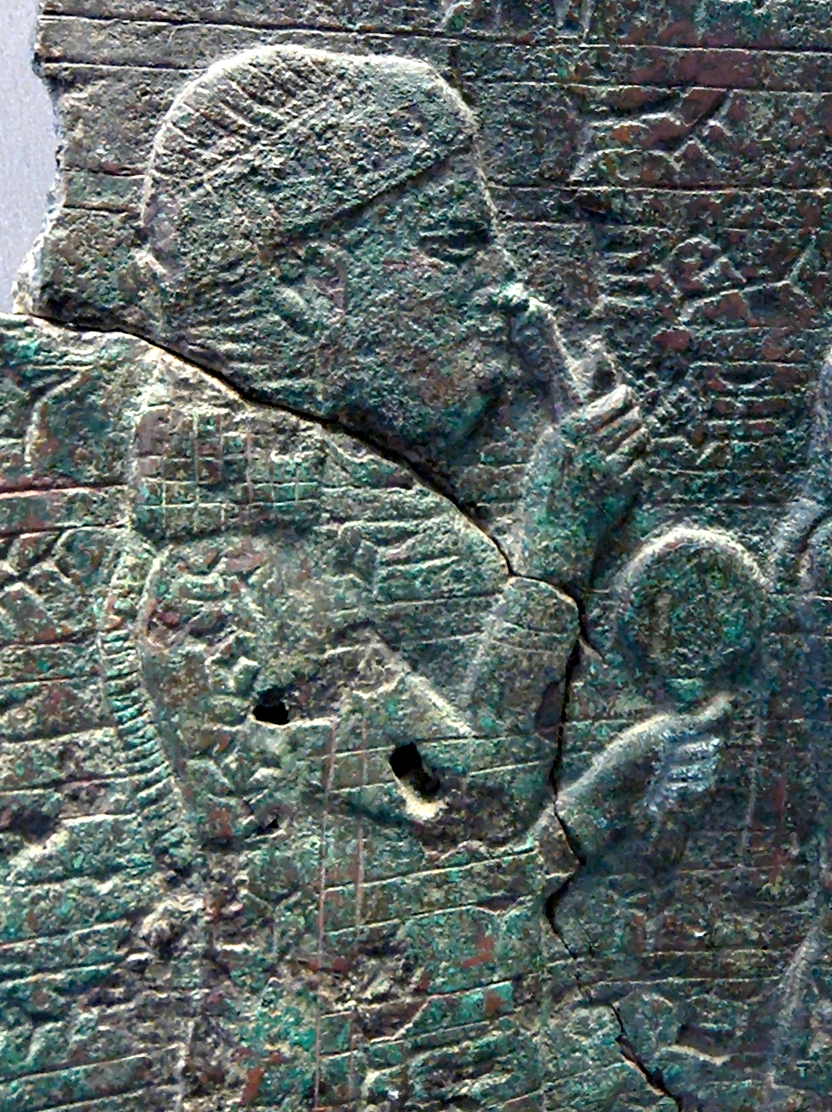
Naqi'a, Sennacherib's wife, 8th-7th centuries BC, the most documented woman in Assyrian history.

The main evidence concerning the lives of ordinary women in ancient Assyria is in administrative documents and law codes. There was no legal distinction between men and women in the Old Assyrian period and they had more or less the same rights in society. Since several letters written by women are known from the Old Assyrian period, it is evident that women were free to learn how to read and write. Both men and women paid the same fines, could inherit property, participated in trade, bought, owned, and sold houses and slaves, made their own last wills, and were allowed to divorce their partners.

Records of Old Assyrian marriages confirm that the dowry to the bride belonged to her, not the husband, and it was inherited by her children after her death. Although they were equal legally, men and women in the Old Assyrian period were raised and socialized differently and had different social expectations and obligations. Typically, girls were raised by their mothers, taught to spin, weave, and help with daily tasks. Boys were taught trades by masters, later often following their fathers on trade expeditions. Sometimes the eldest daughter of a family was consecrated as a priestess. She was not allowed to marry and became economically independent.

Wives were expected to provide their husbands with garments and food. Although marriages were typically monogamous, husbands were allowed to buy a female slave in order to produce an heir if his wife was infertile. The wife was allowed to choose that slave and the slave never gained the status of a second wife. Husbands who were away on long trading journeys were allowed to take a second wife in one of the trading colonies, although with strict rules that must be followed: the second wife was not allowed to accompany him back to Assur and both wives had to be provided with a home to live in, food, and wood.

The status of women decreased in the Middle Assyrian period, as can be gathered from laws concerning them among the Middle Assyrian Laws. Among these laws were punishments for various crimes, often sexual or marital ones. Although they did not deprive women of all their rights and they were not significantly different from other ancient Near Eastern laws of their time, the Middle Assyrian Laws effectively made women second-class citizens. It is not clear how strongly these laws were enforced.

These laws gave men the right to punish their wives as they wished. Among the harshest punishments written into these laws, for a crime not even committed by the woman, was that a raped woman would be forcibly married to her rapist. These laws also specified that certain women were obliged to wear veils while out on the street, marital status being the determining factor. Some women, such as slave women and ḫarımtū women, were prohibited from wearing veils and others, such as certain priestesses, were only allowed to wear veils if they were married.

Not all laws were suppressive against women. Women whose husbands died or were taken prisoner in war, and who did not have any sons or relatives to support them, were guaranteed support from the government. The ḫarımtū women have historically been believed to have been prostitutes, but today, are interpreted as women with an independent social existence, i.e. not tied to a husband, father, or institution. Although most ḫarımtū appear to have been poor, there were noteworthy exceptions. The term appears with negative connotations in several texts. Their mere existence makes it clear that it was possible for women to live independent lives, despite their lesser social standing during that period.

During the Neo-Assyrian period that followed, royal and upper-class women experienced increased influence. Women attached to the Neo-Assyrian royal court sent and received letters, were independently wealthy, and could buy and own lands of their own. The queens of the Neo-Assyrian Empire are better attested historically than queens of preceding periods of the culture. Under the Sargonid dynasty, they were granted their own military units. Sometimes they are known to have partaken in military campaigns alongside other units.

Among the most influential women of the Neo-Assyrian period were Shammuramat, queen of Shamshi-Adad V (r. 824–811 BC), who in the reign of her son Adad-nirari III (r. 811–783 BC) might have been regent and participated in military campaigns. Another is Naqi'a, who influenced politics in the reigns of Sennacherib, Esarhaddon, and Ashurbanipal.

=== Economy ===
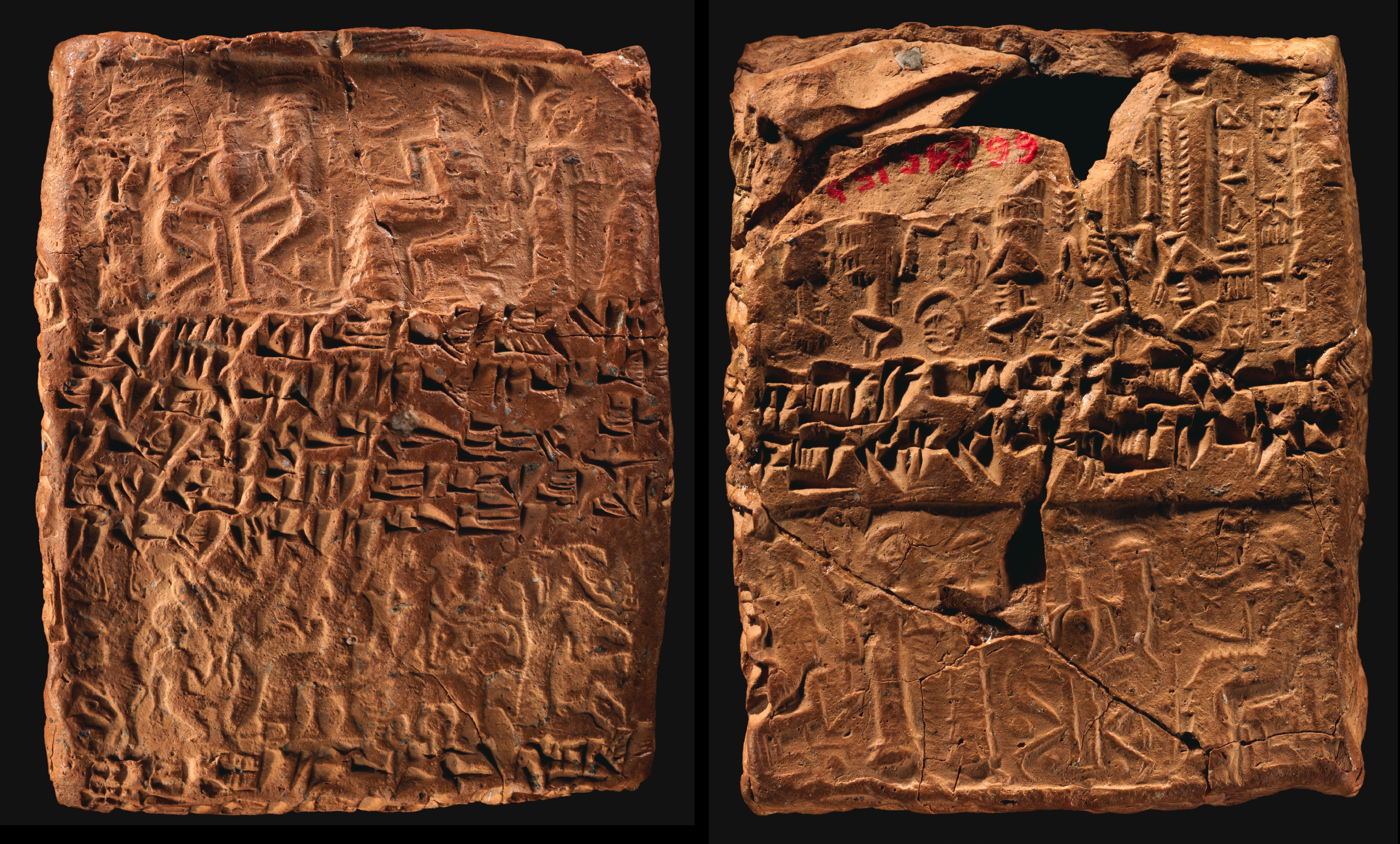
An old Assyrian cuneiform tablet from Kültepe recording the repayment of a loan, impressed with four different cylinder seals

In the Old Assyrian period, a major portion of Assur's population was involved in the city's international trade. As can be gathered from hiring contracts and other records, the trade involved people of many different occupations, including porters, guides, donkey drivers, agents, traders, bakers and bankers. Because of the extensive cuneiform records known from the period, details of the trade are relatively well-known. It has been estimated that just in the period c. 1950–1836 BC, twenty-five tons of Anatolian silver was transported to Assur, and that approximately one hundred tons of tin and 100,000 textiles were transported to Anatolia in return. The Assyrians also sold livestock, processed goods and reed products. In many cases, the materials sold by Assyrian colonists came from far-away places; the textiles sold by Assyrians in Anatolia were imported from southern Mesopotamia and the tin came from the east in the Zagros Mountains.

After international trade declined in the 19th century BC, the Assyrian economy became increasingly oriented toward the state. In the Neo-Assyrian period, the wealth generated through private investments was dwarfed by the wealth of the state, which was by far the largest employer in the empire and had a monopoly on agriculture, manufacturing and exploitation of minerals. The imperial economy advantaged mainly the elite, since it was structured in a way that ensured that surplus wealth flowed to the government and was then used for the maintenance of the state throughout the empire. Though all means of production were owned by the state, there continued to be a vibrant private economic sector within the empire, with property rights of individuals ensured by the government.

=== Personal identity and modern continuity ===
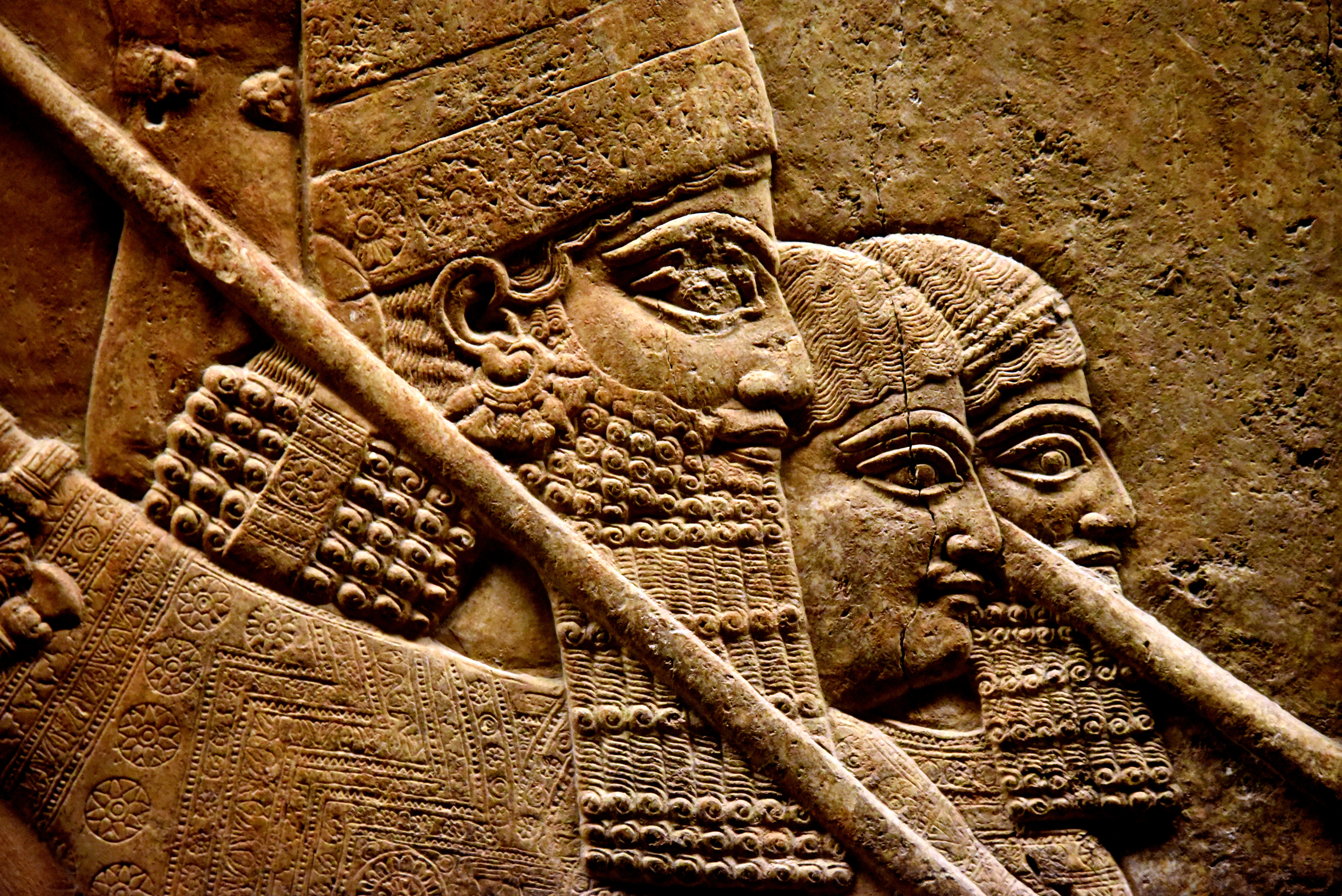
A 7th-century BC relief depicting Ashurbanipal (r. 669–631 BC) and two royal attendants

Ethnicity and culture are largely based in self-perception and self-designation. A distinct Assyrian identity seems to have formed already in the Old Assyrian period, when distinctly Assyrian burial practices, foods and dress codes are attested and Assyrian documents appear to consider the inhabitants of Assur to be a distinct cultural group. A wider Assyrian identity appears to have spread across northern Mesopotamia under the Middle Assyrian Empire, since later writings concerning the reconquests of the early Neo-Assyrian kings refer to some of their wars as liberating the Assyrian people of the cities they reconquered.

Surviving evidence suggests that the ancient Assyrians had a relatively open definition of what it meant to be Assyrian. Modern ideas such as a person's ethnic background, or the Roman idea of legal citizenship, do not appear to have been reflected in ancient Assyria. Although Assyrian accounts and artwork of warfare frequently describe and depict foreign enemies, they are not depicted with different physical features, (Note: The only example of ancient Assyrian art depicting foreigners with different physical features than the Assyrians themselves is the reliefs made in the reign of Ashurbanipal. Possibly influenced by Egyptian art, which did depict foreigners differently, Ashurbanipal's reliefs show Elamites and Urartians as stockier, Urartians with larger noses, and Arabs with long straight hair (in contrast to the curly hair of the Assyrians). Inscriptions and annals from Ashurbanipal's time however offer no evidence that foreigners were seen as racially or ethnically different in terms of biology or physiognomy.) but rather with different clothing and equipment. Assyrian accounts describe enemies as barbaric only in terms of their behavior, as lacking correct religious practices, and as doing wrongdoings against Assyria.

All things considered, there does not appear to have been any well-developed concepts of ethnicity or race in ancient Assyria. What mattered for a person to be seen by others as Assyrian was mainly fulfillment of obligations, such as military service, being affiliated with the Assyrian Empire politically, and maintaining loyalty to the Assyrian king. One of the inscriptions that attest to this view, as well as royal Assyrian policies enacted to encourage assimilation and cultural mixture, is Sargon II's account of the construction of Dur-Sharrukin. One of the passages of the inscription reads:

Subjects of (all) four (parts of the world), of foreign tongues, with different languages without similarity, people from mountainous regions and plains, so many (different people) as the light of the gods, (Note: Referring to the sun god Shamash.) lord above all, supervises, I let dwell inside [my new city] on the command of Ashur my lord [...]. Born Assyrians, experienced in all professions, I set above them as supervisors and guides to teach them how to work properly and respect the gods and the king.

Although the text clearly differentiates the new settlers from those that had been "born Assyrians", the aim of Sargon's policy was also clearly to transform the new settlers into Assyrians through appointing supervisors and guides to teach them. Though the expansion of the Assyrian Empire, in combination with resettlements and deportations, changed the ethno-cultural make-up of the Assyrian heartland, there is no evidence to suggest that the more ancient Assyrian inhabitants of the land ever disappeared or became restricted to a small elite, nor that the ethnic and cultural identity of the new settlers was anything other than "Assyrian" after one or two generations.

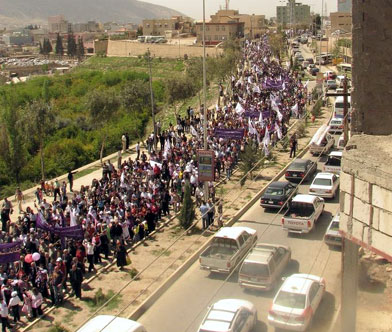
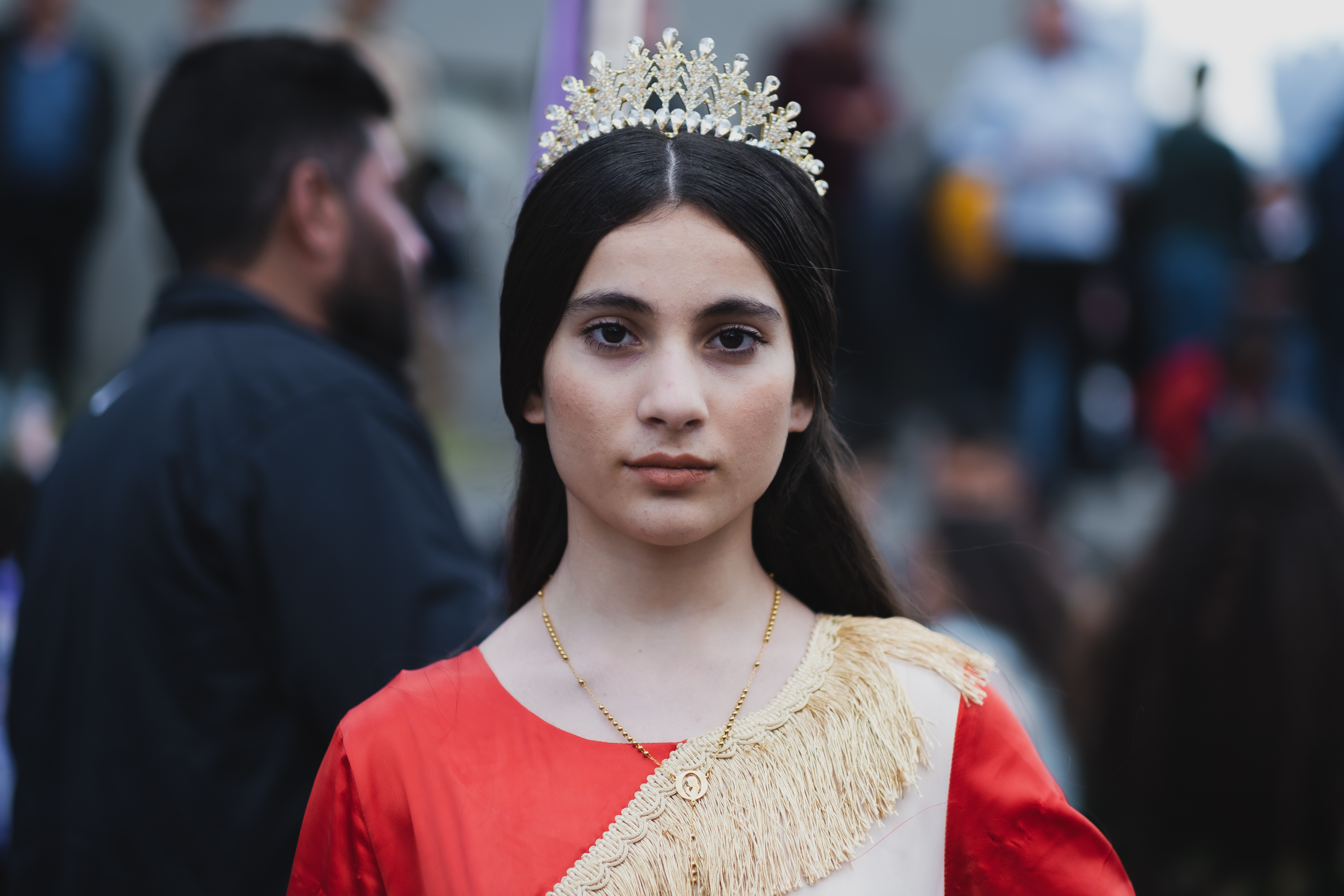
The Akitu festival being celebrated in Duhok in 2008, and an Assyrian woman celebrating Akitu in 2019

Although the use of the term "Assyrian" by the modern Assyrian people has historically been the target of misunderstanding and controversy, both politically and academically, Assyrian continuity is generally scholarly accepted based on both historical and genetic evidence in the sense that the modern Assyrians are regarded to be descendants of the population of the ancient Assyrian Empire. Though the ancient Akkadian language and cuneiform script did not survive for long in Assyria after the empire was destroyed in 609 BC, Assyrian culture clearly did. The old Assyrian religion continued to be practised at Assur until the 3rd century AD, and at other sites for centuries thereafter, gradually losing ground to Christianity. At Mardin, believers in the old religion are known from as late as the 18th century.

Individuals with names harkening back to ancient Mesopotamia are also attested at Assur until it was sacked for the last time in AD 240 and at other sites as late as the 13th century. Though many foreign states ruled over Assyria in the millennia following the empire's fall, there is no evidence of any large scale influx of immigrants that replaced the original population, which instead continued to make up a significant portion of the region's people until the Mongol and Timurid massacres in the late 14th century.

In pre-modern Syriac-language (the type of Aramaic used in Christian Mesopotamian writings) sources, the typical self-designations used are ʾārāmāyā ("Aramean") and suryāyā, with the term ʾāthorāyā ("Assyrian") rarely being used as a self-designation. The terms Assyria (ʾāthor) and Assyrian (ʾāthorāyā) were however used in several senses in pre-modern times; most notably being used for the ancient Assyrians and for the land surrounding Nineveh, and for the city of Mosul, built next to Nineveh's ruins. In Syriac translations of the Bible, the term ʾāthor is also used to refer to the ancient Assyrian Empire. In the sense of a citizen of Mosul, the designation ʾāthorāyā were used for some individuals in the pre-modern period.

The reluctance of Christians to use ʾāthorāyā as a self-designation could perhaps be explained by the Assyrians described in the Bible being prominent enemies of Israel; (Note: This phenomenon does not only apply to the Assyrians; the Christian Greek populace of the Byzantine Empire in the Middle Ages overwhelmingly self-identified as Romans (Rhōmaîoi) rather than Greeks since the term "Greek" was associated with the ancient Pagan Greeks.) the term ʾāthorāyā was sometimes employed in Syriac writings as a term for enemies of Christians. In this context, the term was sometimes applied to the Persians of the Sasanian Empire. The 4th-century Syriac writer Ephrem the Syrian for instance referred to the Sasanian Empire as "filthy ʾāthor, mother of corruption". In a similar fashion, the term was sometimes applied to the later Muslim rulers.

The self-designation suryāyā, suryāyē or sūrōyē, sometimes translated as "Syrian", is believed to be derived from the Akkadian term assūrāyu ("Assyrian"), which was sometimes even in ancient times rendered in the shorter form sūrāyu. Some medieval Syriac Christian documents used āsūrāyē and sūrāyē, rather than āthōrāyē, also for the ancient Assyrians. Medieval and modern Armenian sources also connected assūrāyu and suryāyā, consistently referring to the Aramaic-speaking Christians of Mesopotamia and Syria as Asori.

Despite the complex issue of self-designations, pre-modern Syriac-language sources at times identified positively with the ancient Assyrians and drew connections between the ancient empire and themselves. Most prominently, ancient Assyrian kings and figures long appeared in local folklore and literary tradition and claims of descent from ancient Assyrian royalty were forwarded both for figures in folklore and by actual living high-ranking members of society in northern Mesopotamia. Visits by missionaries from western churches to the Assyrian heartland in the 18th century likely contributed to the Assyrian people more strongly relating their self-designation and identity to ancient Assyria.

In the context of interactions with westerners who connected them to the ancient Assyrians, and due to an increasing number of atrocities and massacres directed against them, the Assyrian people experienced a cultural "awakening" or "renaissance" toward the end of the 19th century, which led to the development of a national ideology more strongly rooted in their descent from ancient Assyria and a re-adoption of self-designations such as ʾāthorāyā and ʾāsurāyā. Today, sūryōyō or sūrāyā are the predominant self-designations used by Assyrians in their native language, though they are typically translated as "Assyrian" rather than "Syrian". (Note: For alternate names and the name debate in the Syriac Christian community, see terms for Syriac Christians)

== Culture ==
=== Languages ===
==== Akkadian ====
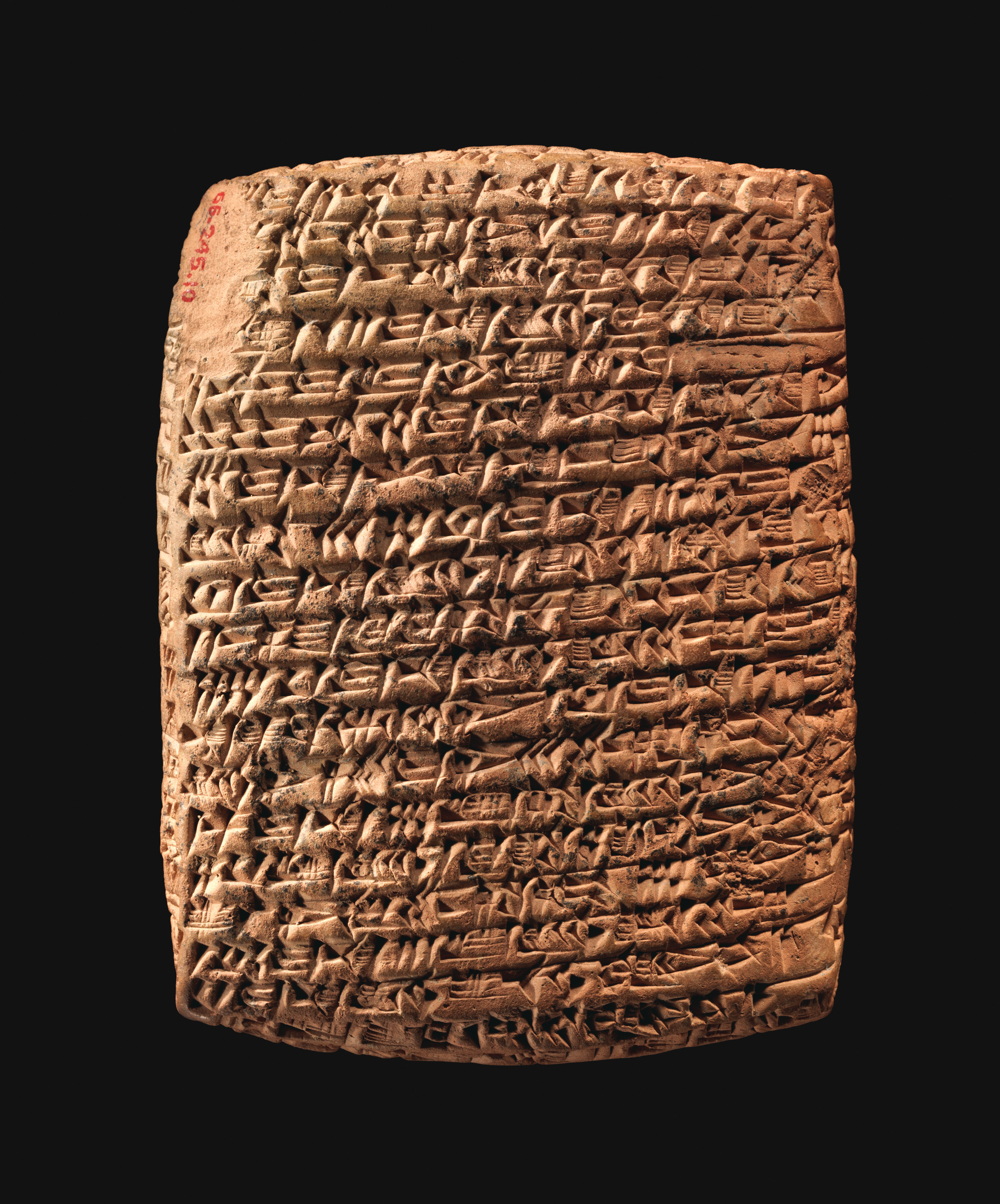
An Old Assyrian cuneiform tablet, containing an account of a caravan journey

The ancient Assyrians primarily spoke and wrote the Assyrian language, a Semitic language (i.e. related to modern Hebrew and Arabic) closely related to Babylonian, spoken in southern Mesopotamia. Both Assyrian and Babylonian are generally regarded by modern scholars to be dialects of the Akkadian language. This is a modern convention since contemporary ancient authors considered Assyrian and Babylonian to be two separate languages. Only Babylonian was referred to as akkadûm, with Assyrian being referred to as aššurû or aššurāyu. Though both were written with cuneiform script, the signs look quite different and can be distinguished relatively easily.

Given the vast timespan covered by ancient Assyria, the Assyrian language developed and evolved over time. Modern scholars broadly categorize it into three different periods, roughly (though far from precisely) corresponding to the periods used to divide Assyrian history: the Old Assyrian language (2000–1500 BC), Middle Assyrian language (1500–1000 BC) and Neo-Assyrian language (1000–500 BC). Because the record of Assyrian tablets and documents is still somewhat spotty, many of the stages of the language remain poorly known and documented.

The signs used in Old Assyrian texts are for the most part less complex than those used during the succeeding Middle and Neo-Assyrian periods and they were fewer in number, amounting to no more than 150–200 unique signs, most of which were syllabic signs (representing syllables). Due to the limited number of signs used, Old Assyrian is relatively easier to decipher for modern researchers than later forms of the language, though the limited number of signs also means that there are in cases several possible alternative phonetic values and readings. This means that while it is easy to decipher the signs, many researchers remain uncomfortable with the language itself. Though it was a more archaic variant of the later Assyrian language, Old Assyrian also contains several words that are not attested in later periods, some being peculiar early forms of words and others being names for commercial terms or various textile and food products from Anatolia.

In the Middle and Neo-Assyrian empires, the later versions of the Assyrian language were not the only versions of Akkadian used. Though Assyrian was typically used in letters, legal documents, administrative documents, and as a vernacular, Standard Babylonian was also used in an official capacity. Standard Babylonian was a highly codified version of ancient Babylonian, as used around 1500 BC, and was used as a language of high culture, for nearly all scholarly documents, literature, poetry and royal inscriptions. The culture of the Assyrian elite was strongly influenced by Babylonia in the south; in a vein similar to how Greek civilization was respected in, and influenced, ancient Rome, the Assyrians had much respect for Babylon and its ancient culture.

Because of the multilingual nature of the vast empire, many loan words are attested as entering the Assyrian language during the Neo-Assyrian period. The number of surviving documents written in cuneiform grow considerably fewer in the late reign of Ashurbanipal, which suggests that the language was declining since it is probably attributable to an increased use of Aramaic, often written on perishable materials such as leather scrolls or papyrus. The ancient Assyrian language did not disappear completely until around the end of the 6th century BC, well into the subsequent post-imperial period.

==== Aramaic and other languages ====
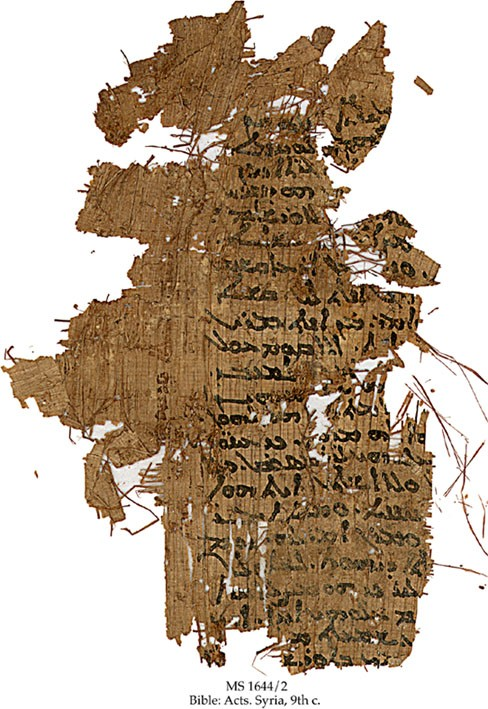
A 9th-century AD piece of papyrus, with Syriac language writing

Because the Assyrians never imposed their language on foreign peoples whose lands they conquered outside of the Assyrian heartland, there were no mechanisms in place to stop the spread of languages other than Akkadian. Beginning with the migrations of Arameans into Assyrian territory during the Middle Assyrian period, this lack of linguistic policies facilitated the spread of the Aramaic language. As the most widely spoken and mutually understandable of the Semitic languages (the language group containing many of the languages spoken through the empire), Aramaic grew in importance throughout the Neo-Assyrian period and increasingly replaced the Neo-Assyrian language even within the Assyrian heartland itself. From the 9th century BC onward, Aramaic became the de facto lingua franca of the Neo-Assyrian Empire, with Neo-Assyrian and other forms of Akkadian becoming relegated to a language of the political elite.

From the time of Shalmaneser III, in the 9th century BC, Aramaic was used in state-related contexts alongside Akkadian and by the time of Tiglath-Pileser III, the kings employed both Akkadian and Aramaic-language royal scribes, confirming the rise of Aramaic to a position of an official language used by the imperial administration. During the time after the fall of the Neo-Assyrian Empire, the old Assyrian language was completely abandoned in Mesopotamia in favor of Aramaic. By 500 BC, Akkadian was probably no longer a spoken language.

Modern Assyrian people refer to their language as "Assyrian" (Sūrayt or Sūreth). Though it has little in common with the Assyrian dialect of the Akkadian language, it is a modern version of the ancient Mesopotamian Aramaic. The language retains some influence of ancient Akkadian, particularly in the form of loanwords. Modern Assyrian varieties of Aramaic are often referred to by scholars as Neo-Aramaic or Neo-Syriac. As a liturgical language, many Assyrians also speak Syriac, a codified version of classical Aramaic as spoken at Edessa during the Christianization of Assyria.

Another language sometimes used in ancient Assyria as a language of scholarship and culture, though only in written form, was the ancient Sumerian language. At the height of the Neo-Assyrian Empire, various other local languages were also spoken within the imperial borders, though none achieved the same level of official recognition as Aramaic.

=== Architecture ===
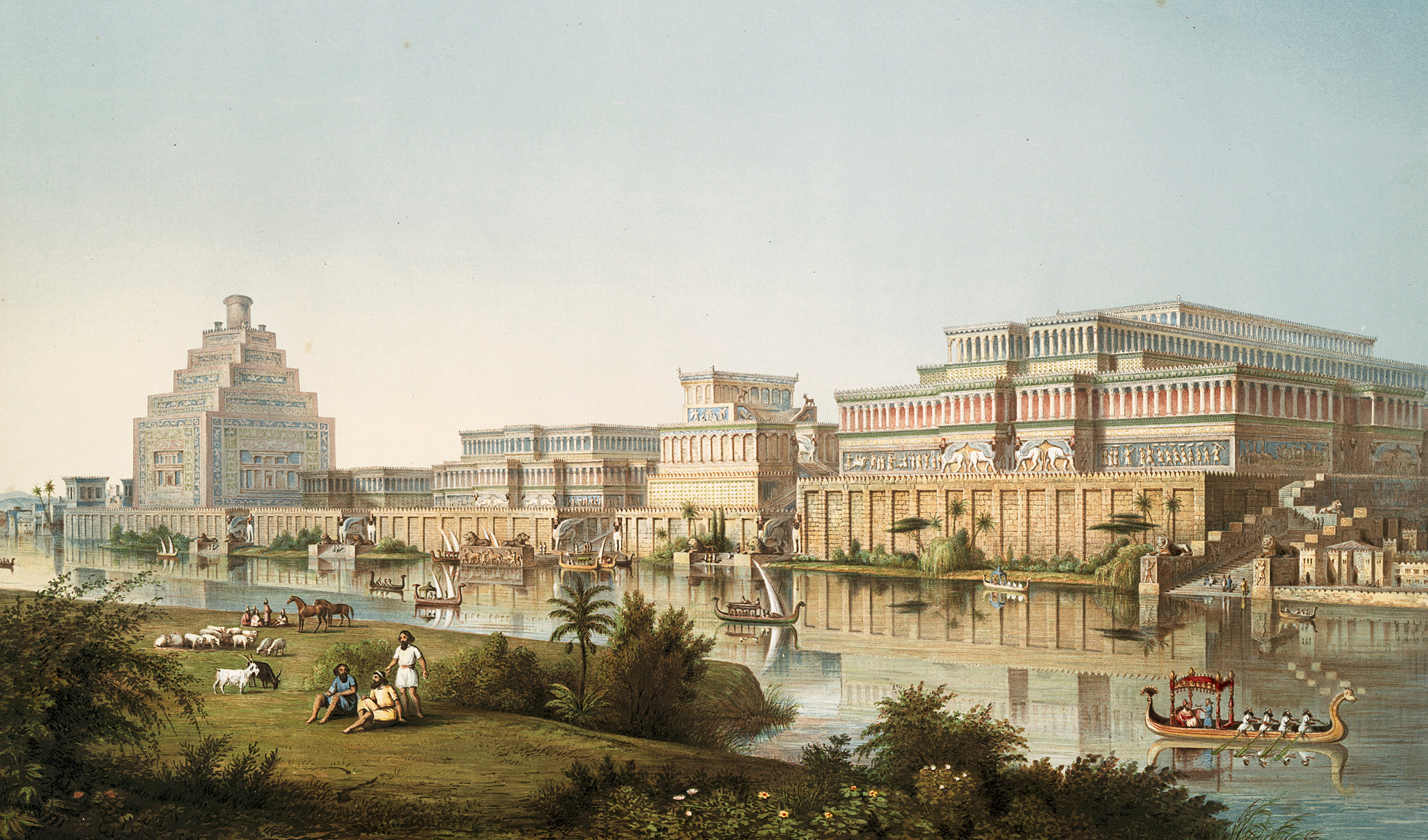
A 19th-century reconstruction of Nineveh, the Assyrian capital 705–612 BC

There are three surviving forms of primary evidence for the architecture of ancient Assyria. The most important form is the surviving buildings themselves, found through archaeological excavations, but important evidence can also be gathered from both contemporary documentation, such as letters and administrative documents that describe buildings that might not have been preserved, as well as documentation by later kings concerning the building works of previous kings. Assyrian buildings and construction works were almost always constructed out of mudbrick. Limestone was also used, though primarily only in works such as aqueducts and river walls, exposed to running water, and defensive fortifications.

In order to support large buildings, they were often built on top of foundation platforms or on mud brick foundations. Floors were typically made of rammed earth, covered in important rooms with carpets or reed mats. Floors in locations that were exposed to the elements, such as outside on terraces or in courtyards, were paved with stone slabs or backed bricks. Roofs, particularly in larger rooms, were supported through the use of wooden beams.

The ancient Assyrians accomplished several technologically complex construction projects, including constructions of whole new capital cities, which indicates sophisticated technical knowledge. Though in large part following previous Mesopotamian architecture, there are several characteristic features of ancient Assyrian architecture. Some examples of features of ancient Assyrian architecture include stepped merlons, vaulted roofs, and palaces to a large degree often being made up of sets of self-contained suites.

=== Art ===
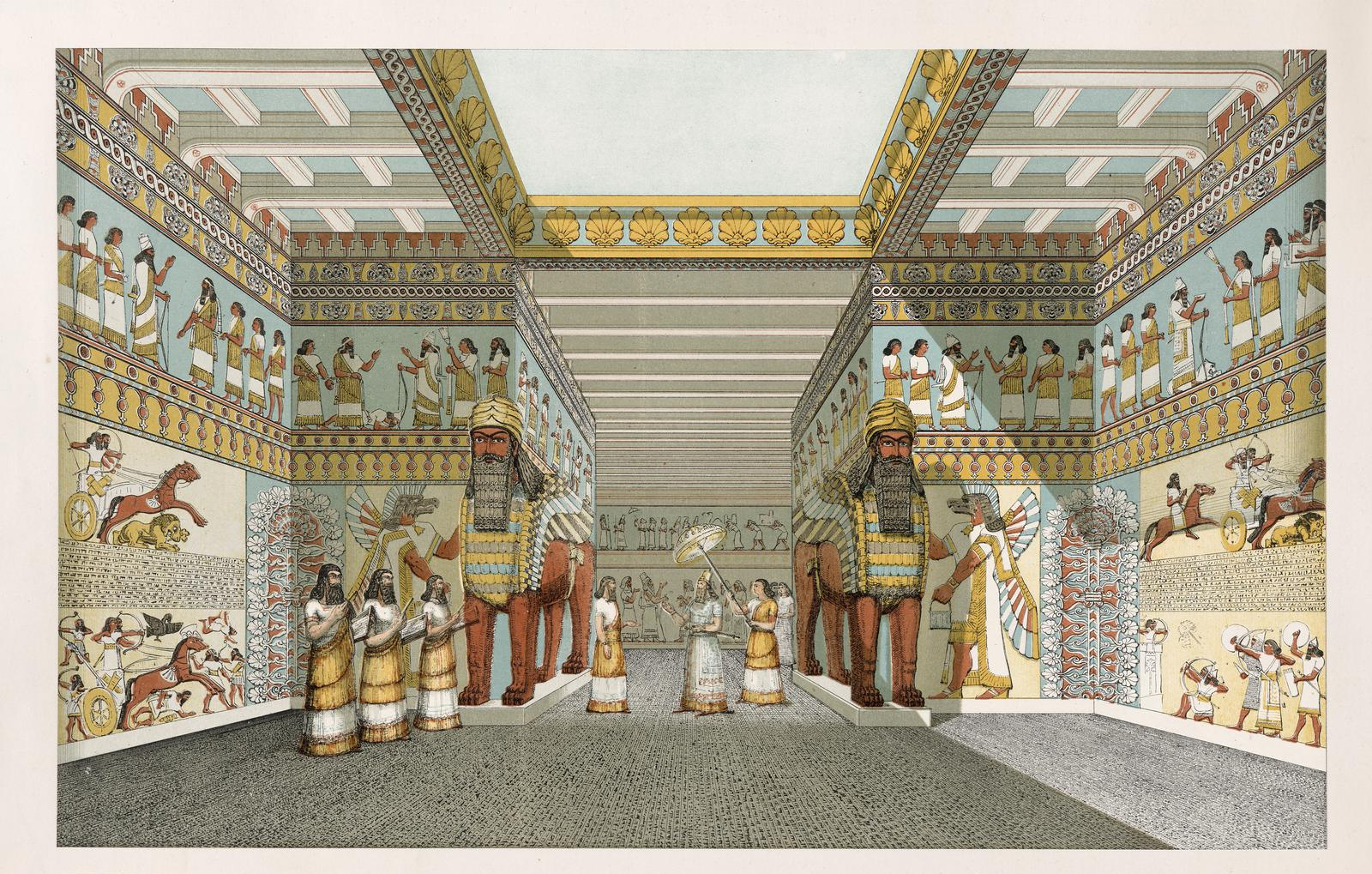
Austen Henry Layard's illustration "The Monuments of Nineveh", 1849

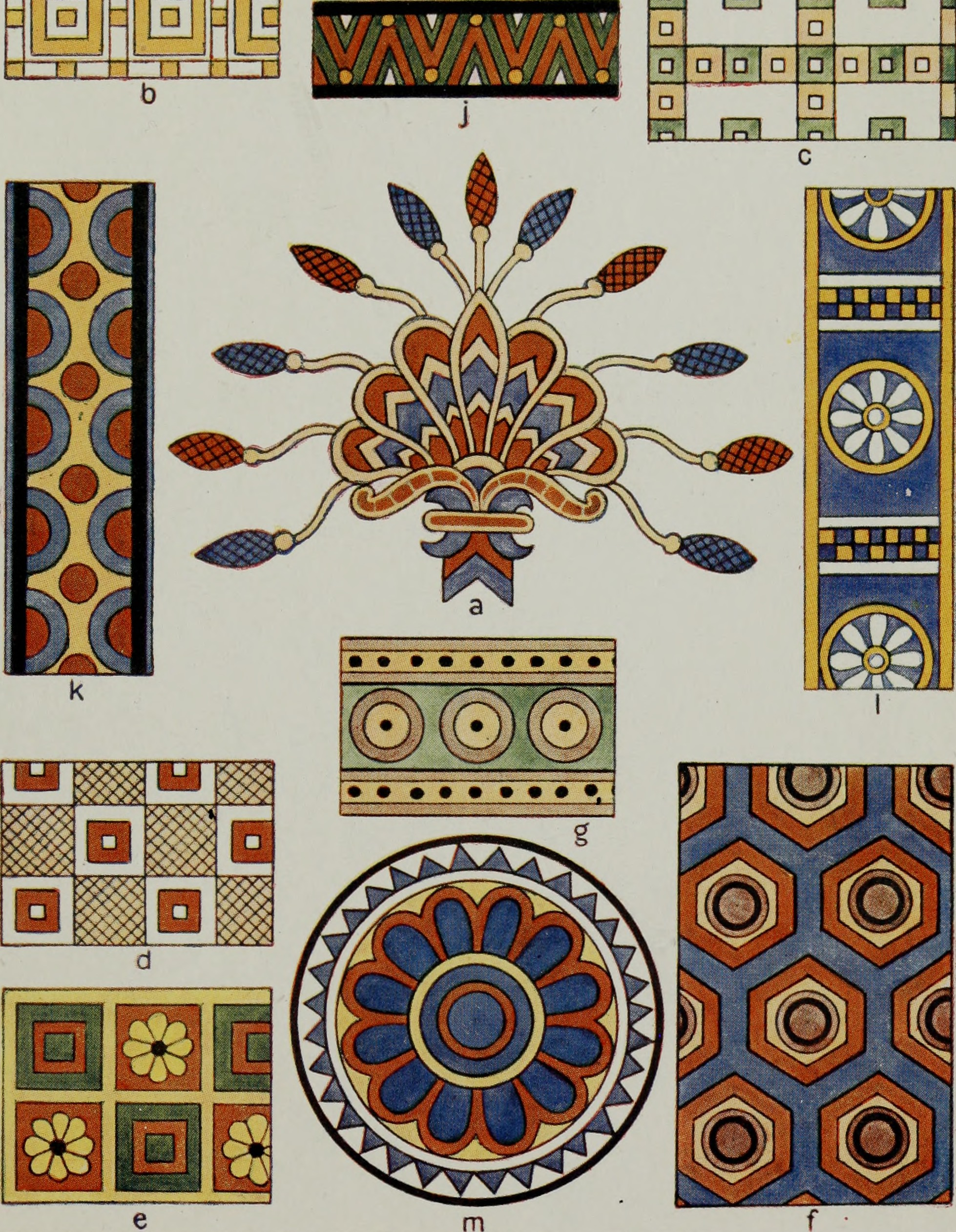
A 20th-century illustration of decorative patterns found in ancient Assyrian reliefs and garments

A relatively large number of statues and figurines have been recovered from the ruins of temples in Assur dating to the Early Assyrian period. Most of the surviving artwork from this time was clearly influenced by the artwork of foreign powers. For instance, a set of 87 alabaster figures of male and female worshippers from Assur before the rise of the Akkadian Empire greatly resembles Early Dynastic Sumerian figures. Because of variation in artwork elsewhere, the artwork of early Assur was also highly variable depending on the time period, ranging from highly stylized to highly naturalistic.

Among the most unique finds from the Early period is the head of a woman of which her eyes, eyebrows, and elaborate hair covering were originally inlaid. This head is typical of the art style of the Akkadian period, with an overall naturalistic style, smooth and soft curves and a full mouth. Another unique art piece from the early period is an ivory figurine of a nude woman, and fragments of at least five additional similar figurines. The ivory used might have come from Indian elephants, which would indicate trade between early Assur and the early tribes and states of Iran. Among other artwork known from the early period are a handful of large stone statues of rulers (governors and foreign kings), figures of animals, and stone statues of naked women.

The artwork known from the Old Assyrian period, other than a few objects such as a partial stone statue perhaps depicting Erishum I, is largely limited to seals and impressions of seals on cuneiform documents. Royal seals from the Puzur-Ashur dynasty of kings, prior to the rise of Shamshi-Adad I, are very similar to the seals of the kings of the Third Dynasty of Ur. In the Middle Assyrian period, from Ashur-uballit I onward, seals looked quite different and appear to emphasize royal power, rather than the theological and cosmic sources of the king's right to rule. Among non-royal seals of the Middle Assyrian period a wide assortment of different motifs are known, including both religious scenes and peaceful scenes of animals and trees. From the time of Tukulti-Ninurta I onward, seals also sometimes featured contests and struggles between humans, various animals, and mythological creatures.

Several other new artistic innovations were also made in the Middle Assyrian period. In the temple dedicated to Ishtar in Assur, four cult pedestals (or "altars") from the time of Tukulti-Ninurta I have been discovered. These altars were decorated with various motifs, common inclusions being the king (sometimes multiple times) and protective divine figures and standards. One of the pedestals preserves along the lower step of its base a relief image which is the earliest known narrative image in Assyrian art history. This relief, which is not very well-preserved, appears to depict rows of prisoners before the Assyrian king.

The earliest known Assyrian wall paintings are also from the time of Tukulti-Ninurta I, from his palace in Kar-Tukulti-Ninurta. Motifs included plant-based patterns (rosettes and palmettes), trees and bird-headed genies. The colors used to paint the walls included black, red, blue, and white. An unusual limestone statue of a nude woman is known from Nineveh from the time of Ashur-bel-kala (r. 1074–1056 BC). An entirely new type of monument introduced in the 11th century BC were obelisks; four-sided stone stelae decorated all around with both images and text. Obelisks saw continued use until at least the 9th century BC.

Compared to other periods, a larger amount of artwork survives from the Neo-Assyrian period, particularly monumental art made under the patronage of the kings. The most well-known form of Neo-Assyrian monumental art are wall reliefs, carved stone artwork that lined the internal and external walls of temples and palaces. Another well-known form of Neo-Assyrian art are colossi, often human-headed lions or bulls (lamassu), that were placed at the gates of temples, palaces and cities. The earliest known examples of both wall reliefs and colossi are from the reign of Ashurnasirpal II, who might have been inspired by the Hittite monumental art that he saw on his campaigns to the Mediterranean.

Wall paintings such as those made under Tukulti-Ninurta I in the Middle Assyrian period also continued to be used, sometimes to supplement wall reliefs and sometimes instead of them. Interior walls could be decorated by covering the mudbrick used in construction with painted mud plaster and exterior walls were at times decorated with glazed and painted tiles or bricks. The most extensive known surviving sets of wall reliefs are from the reign of Sennacherib. In terms of Neo-Assyrian artwork, modern scholars have paid particular attention to the reliefs produced under Ashurbanipal, which have been described as possessing a distinct "epic quality" unlike the art under his predecessors.

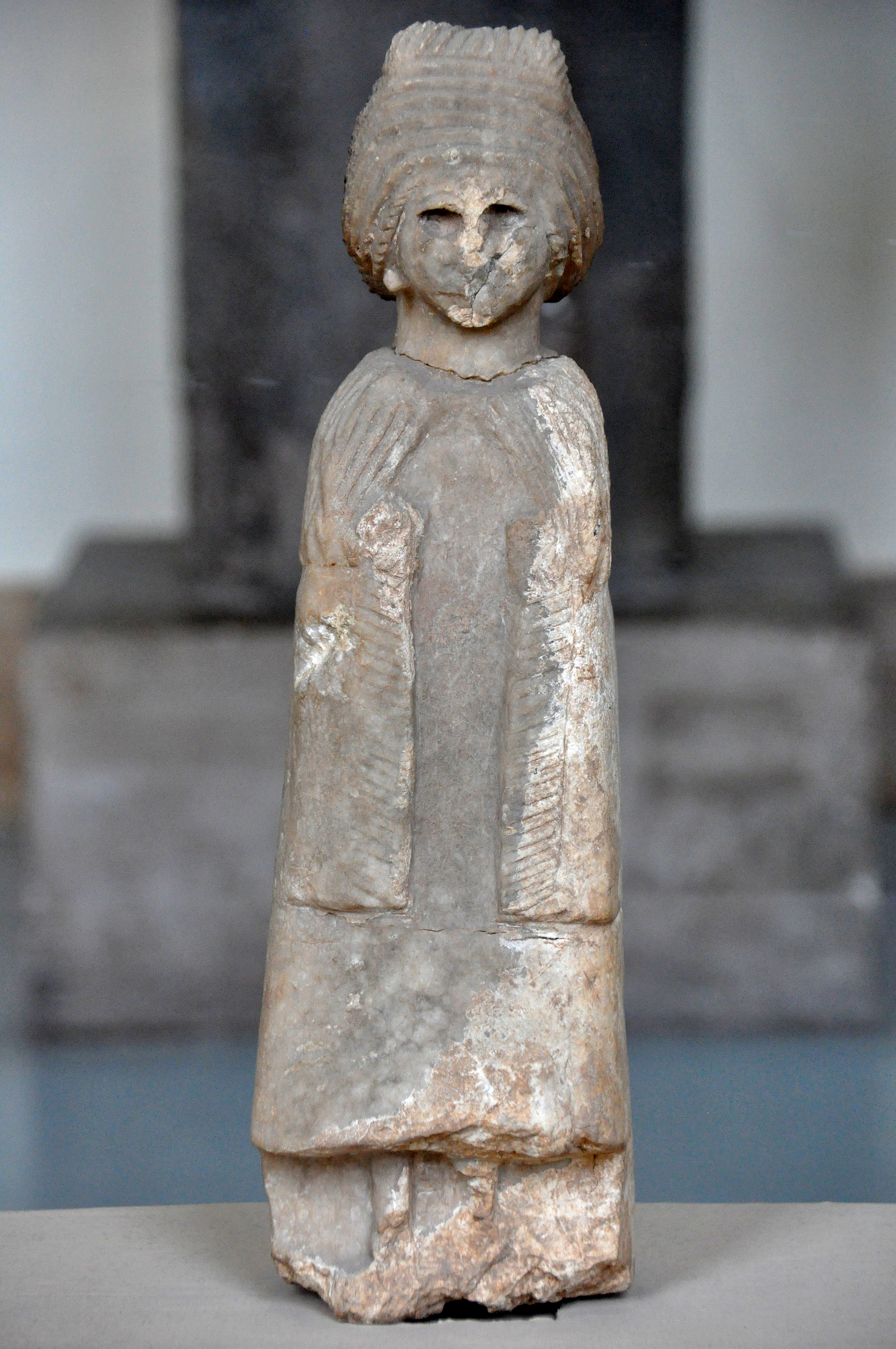
A statue of a praying woman, 25th century BC

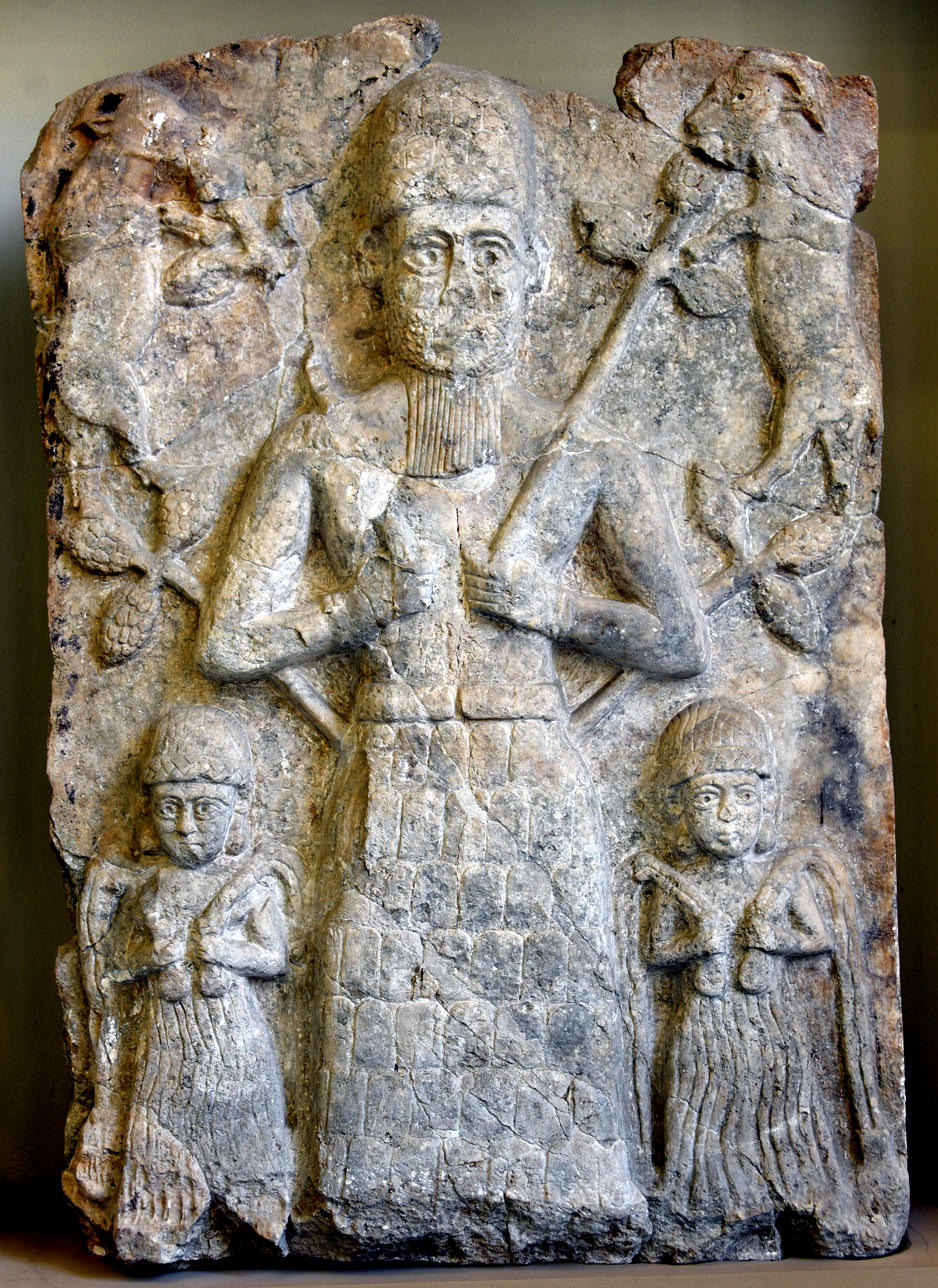
A wall relief probably depicting Ashur, 21st–16th century BC

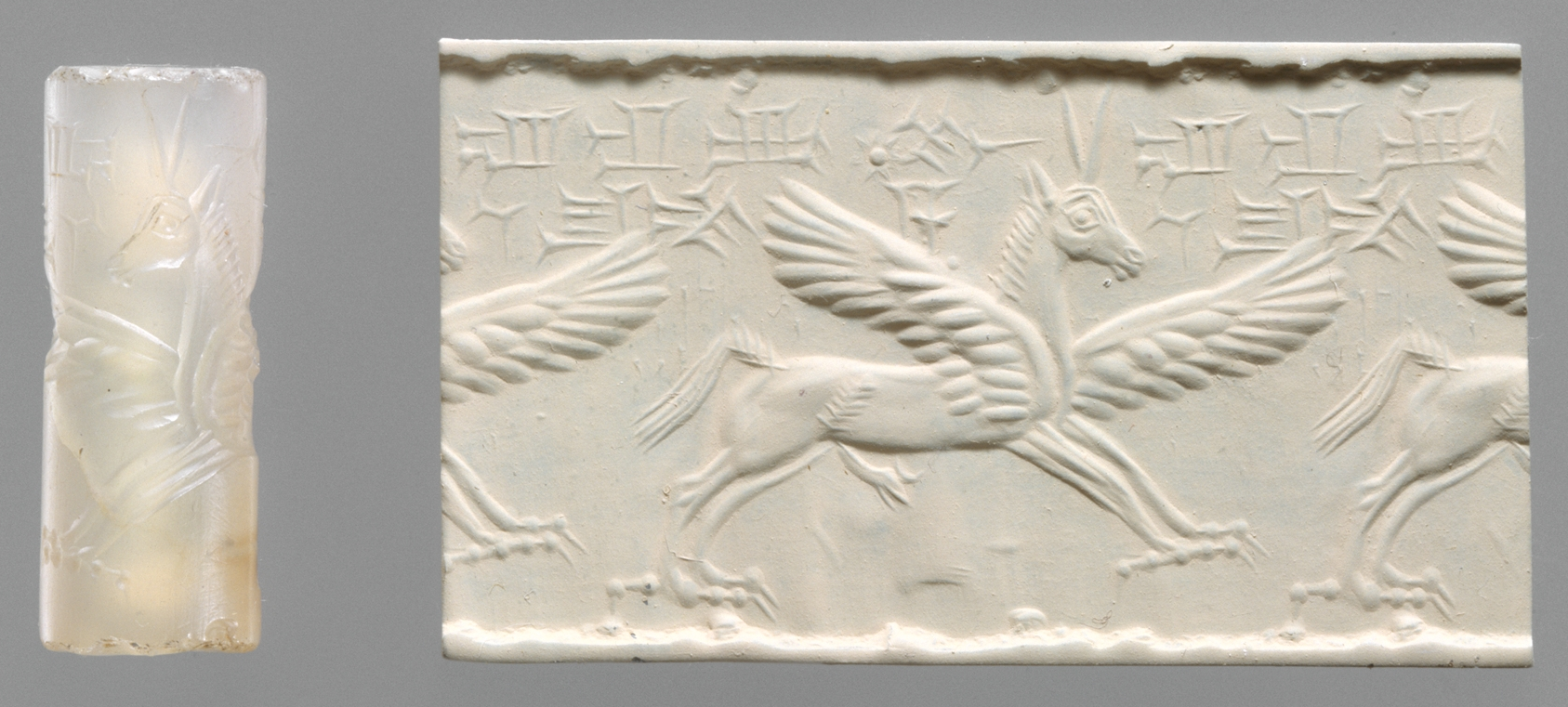
A cylinder seal and impression, 14th–13th century BC

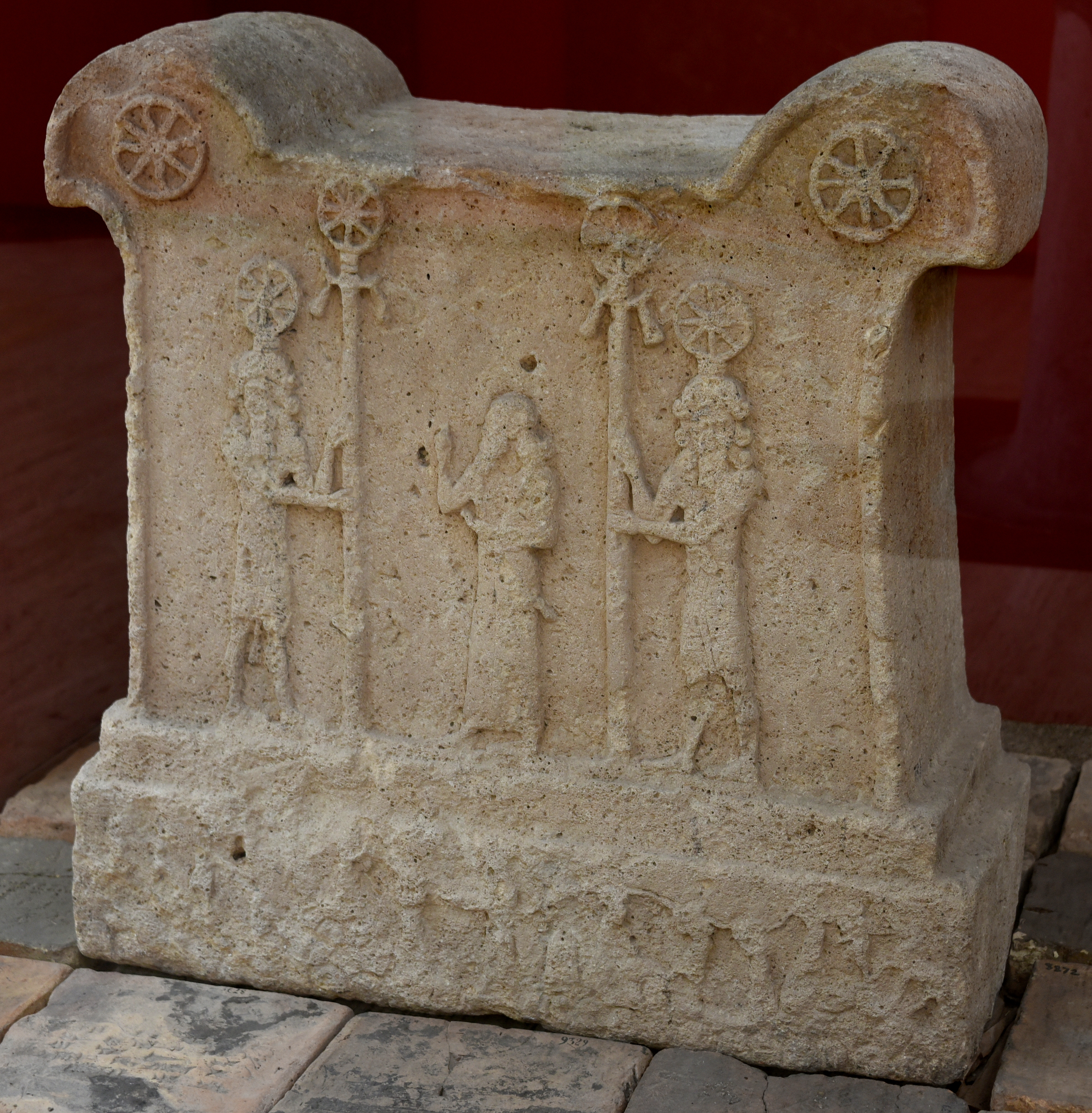
Temple altar of Tukulti-Ninurta I, 13th century BC

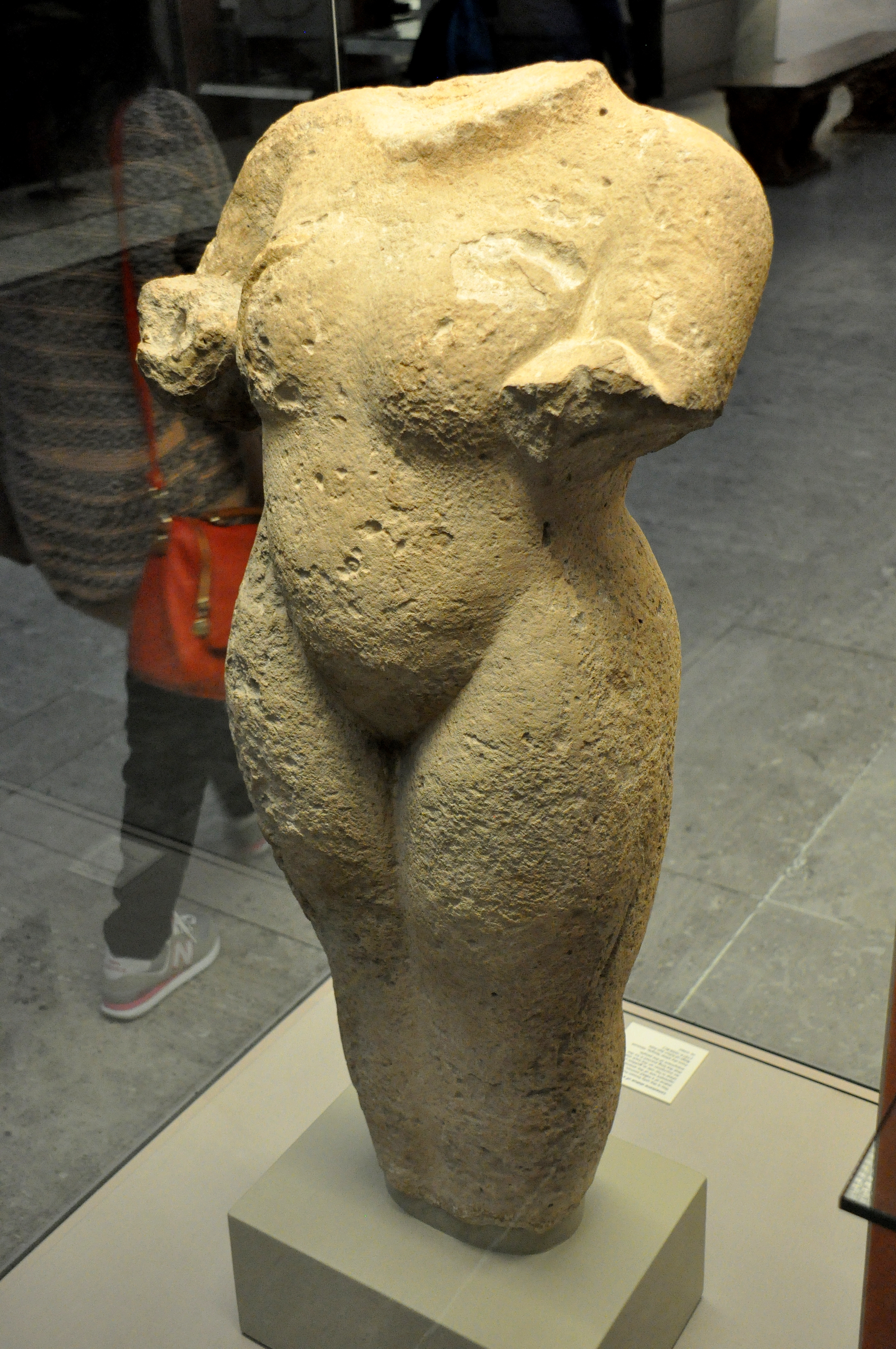
A statue of a nude woman, 11th century BC

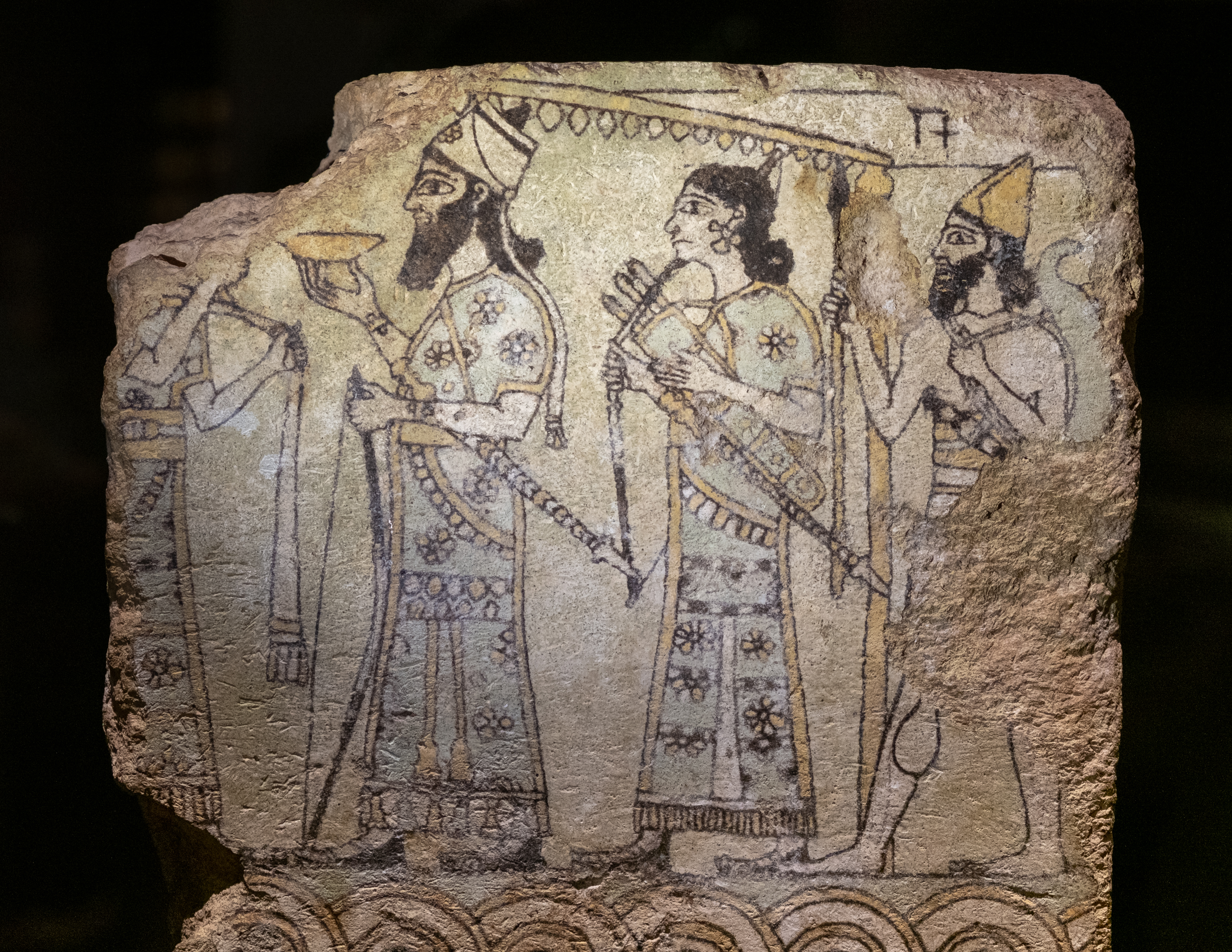
A glazed tile depicting a king and attendants, 9th century BCE

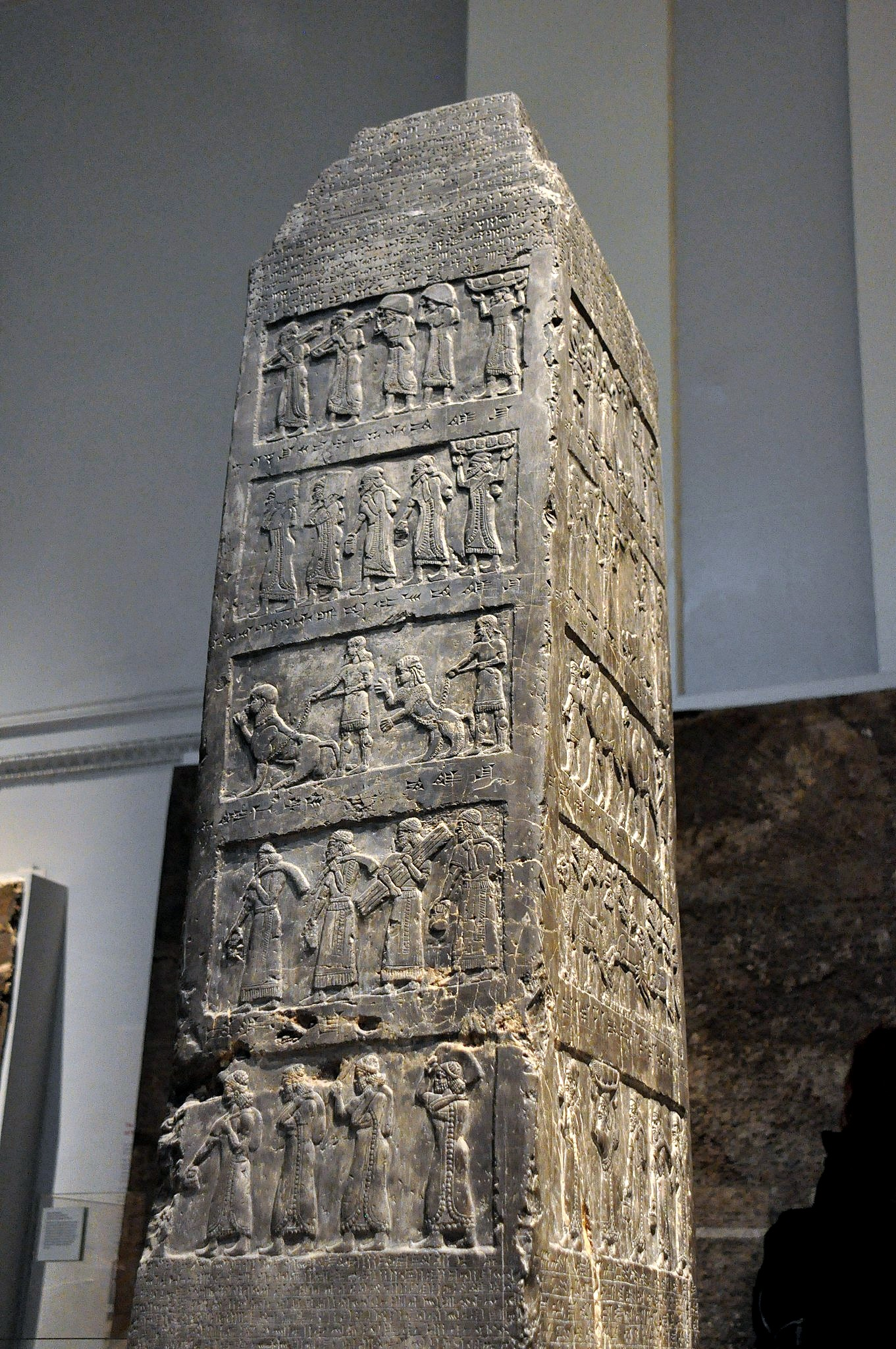
The Black Obelisk of Shalmaneser III, 9th century BC

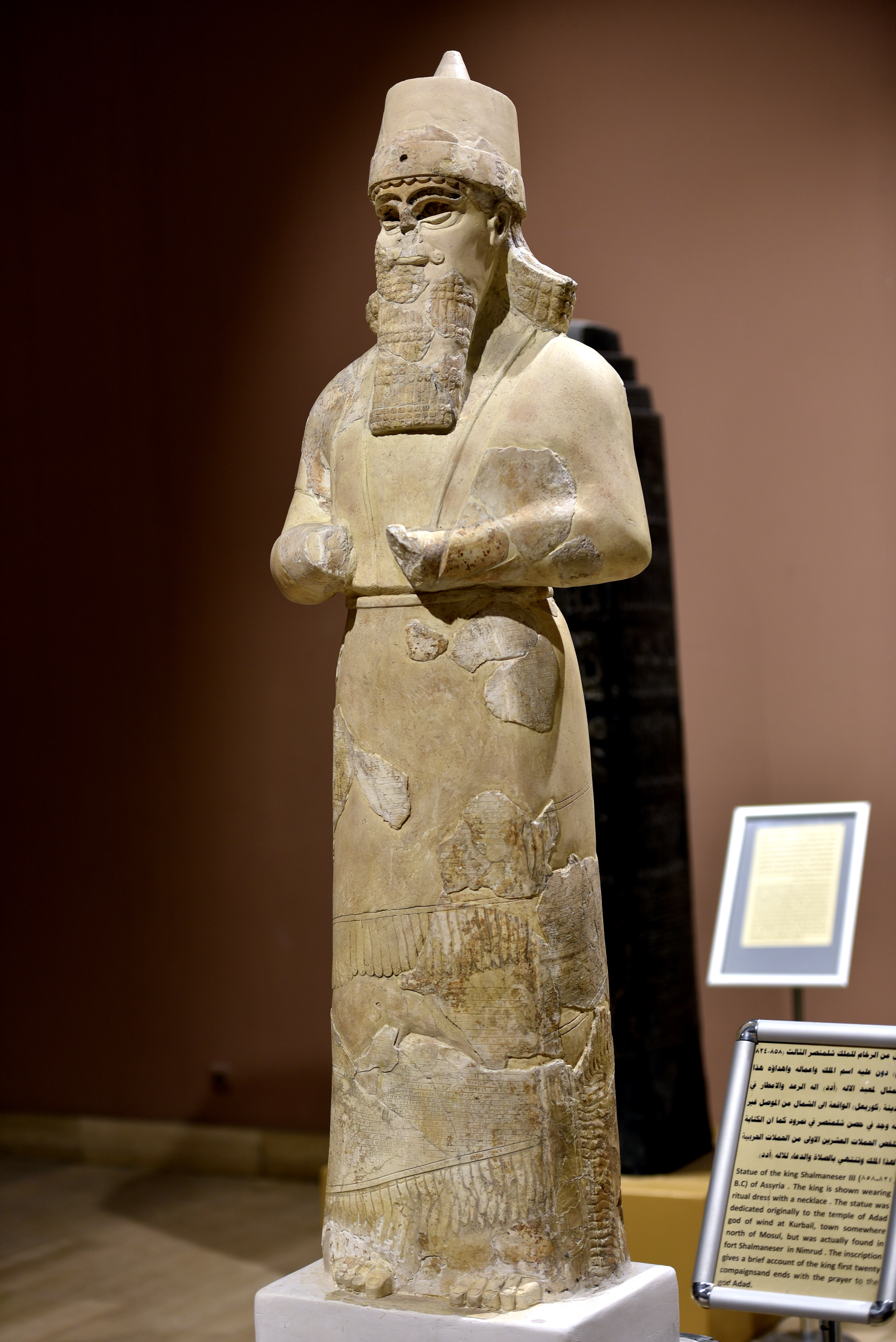
A statue of Shalmaneser III, 9th century BC

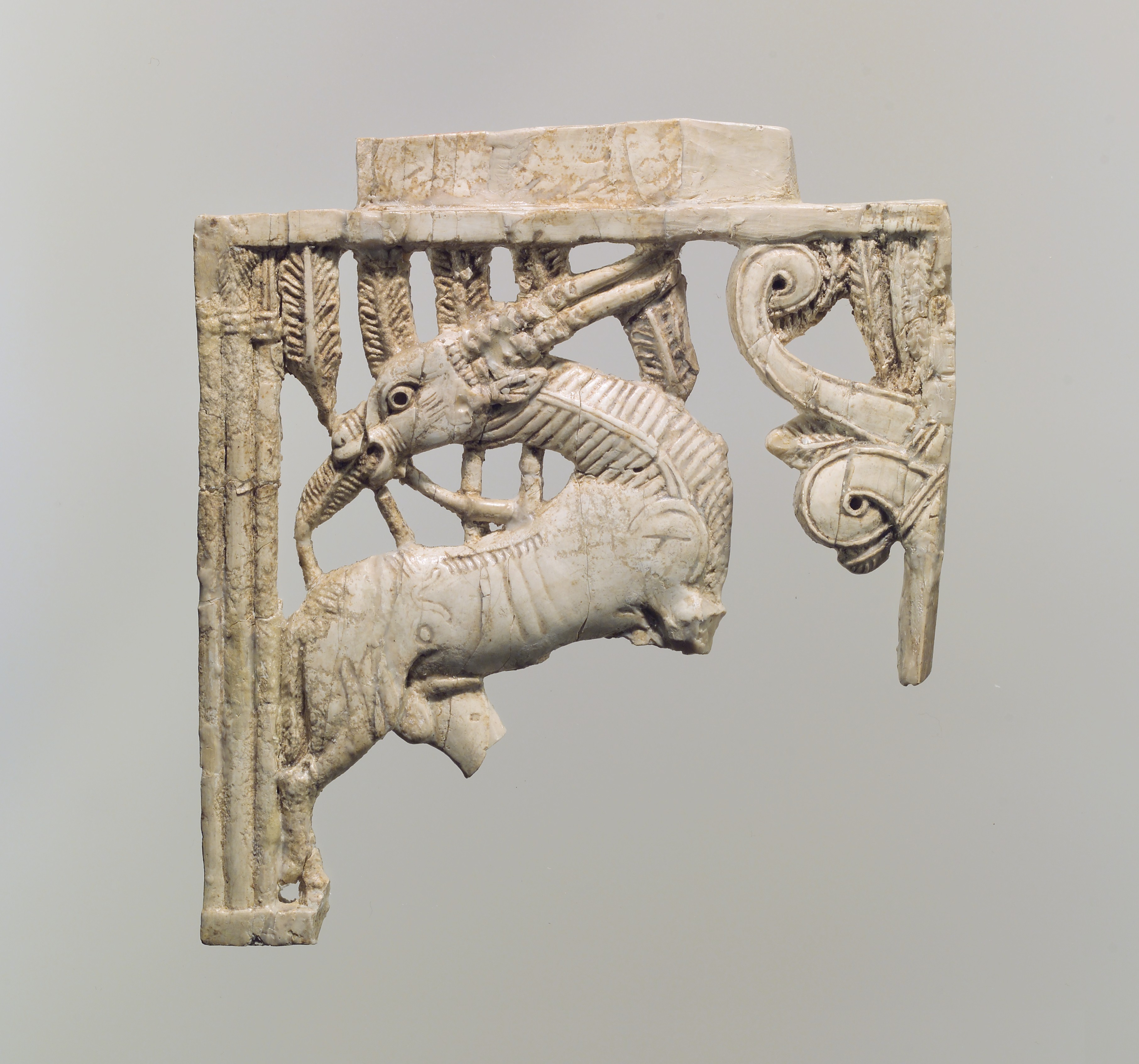
Furniture ornament, 9th–8th century BC

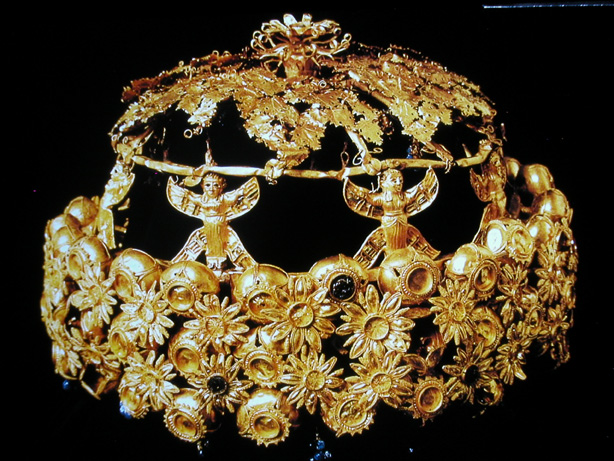
A crown of Queen Hama, 8th century BC

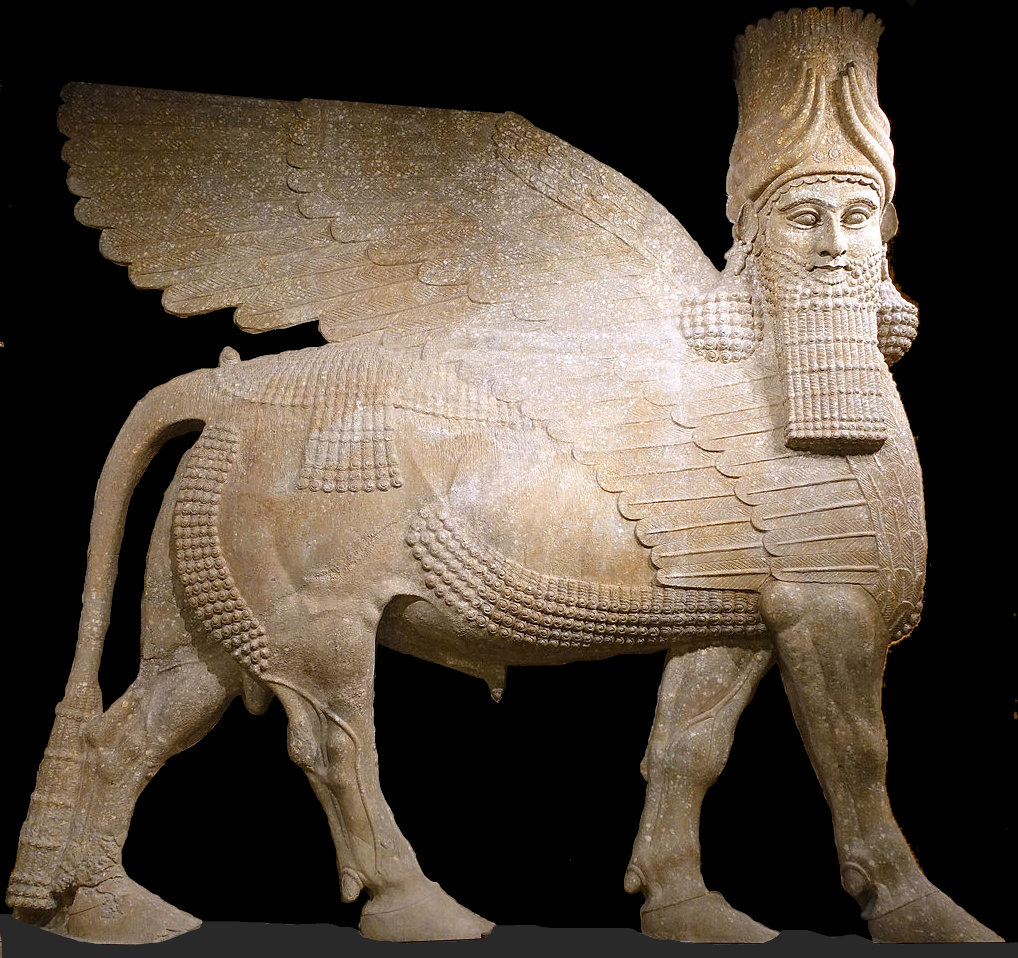
A giant lamassu, 8th century BC

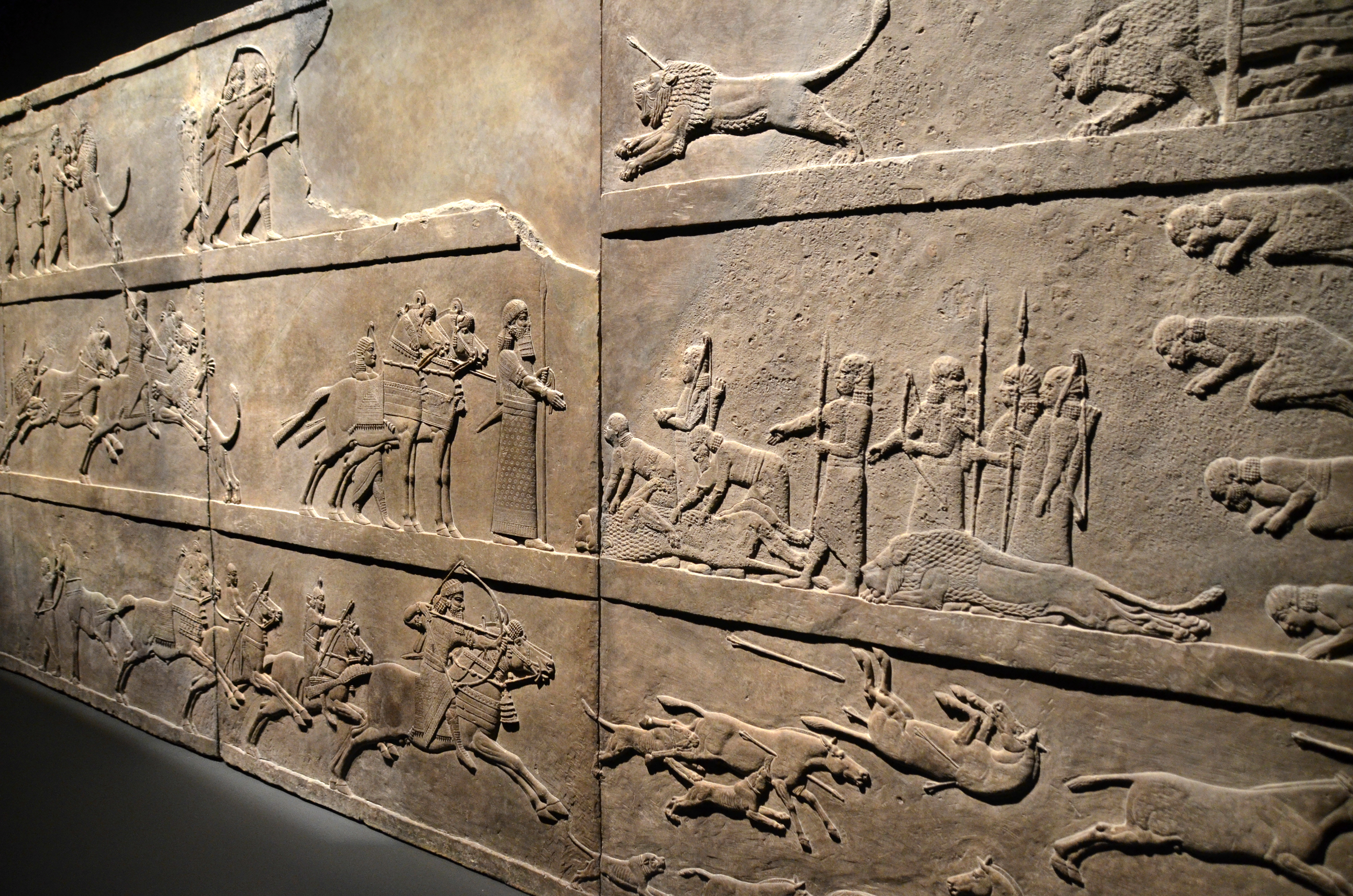
A portion of the Lion Hunt of Ashurbanipal, 7th century BC

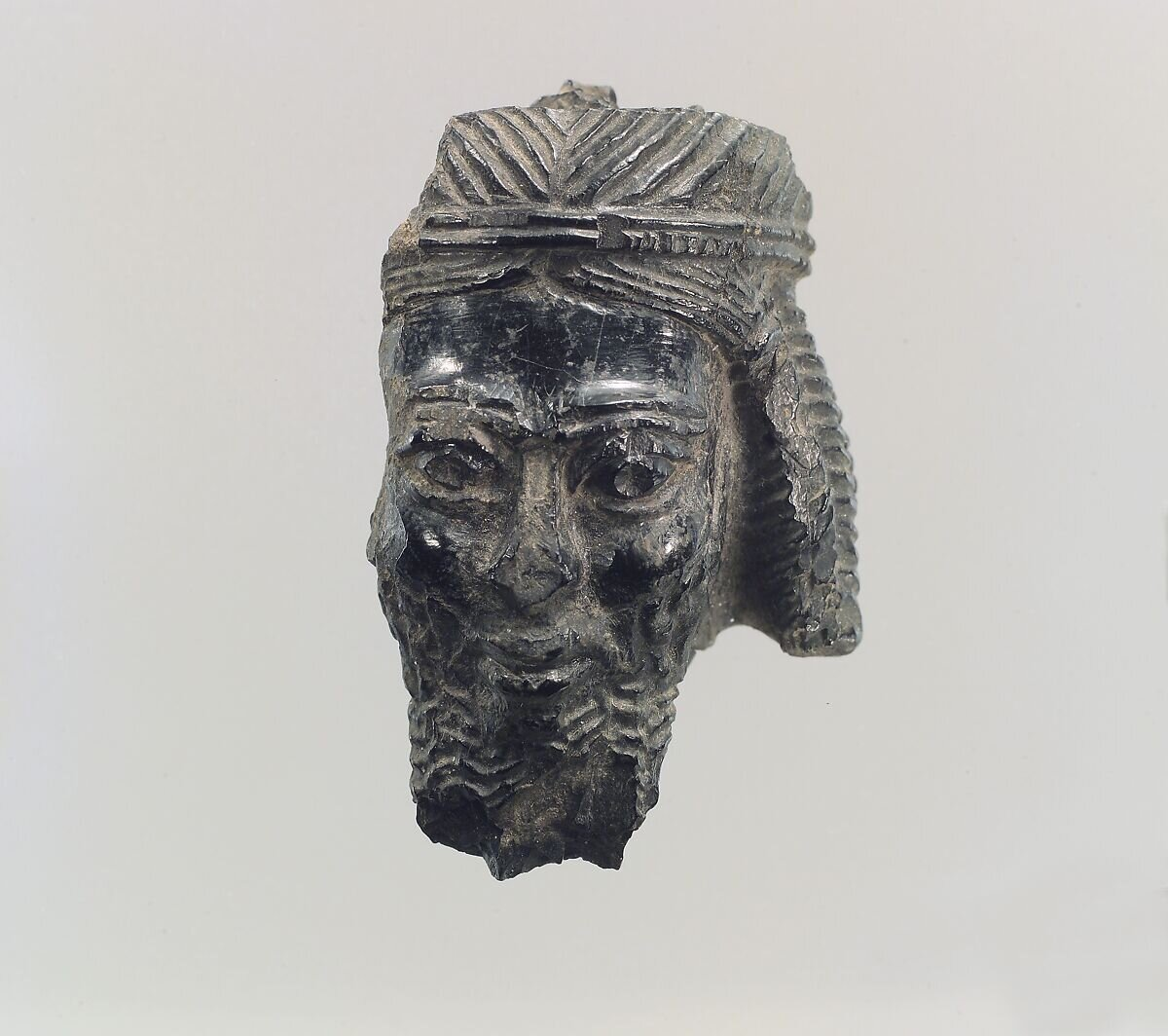
The ivory tusks that provided the raw material for these objects were almost certainly from African elephants, imported from lands south of Egypt, although elephants inhabited several river valleys in Syria until they were hunted to extinction by the end of the eighth century B.C. Metropolitan Museum of Art

=== Scholarship and literature ===
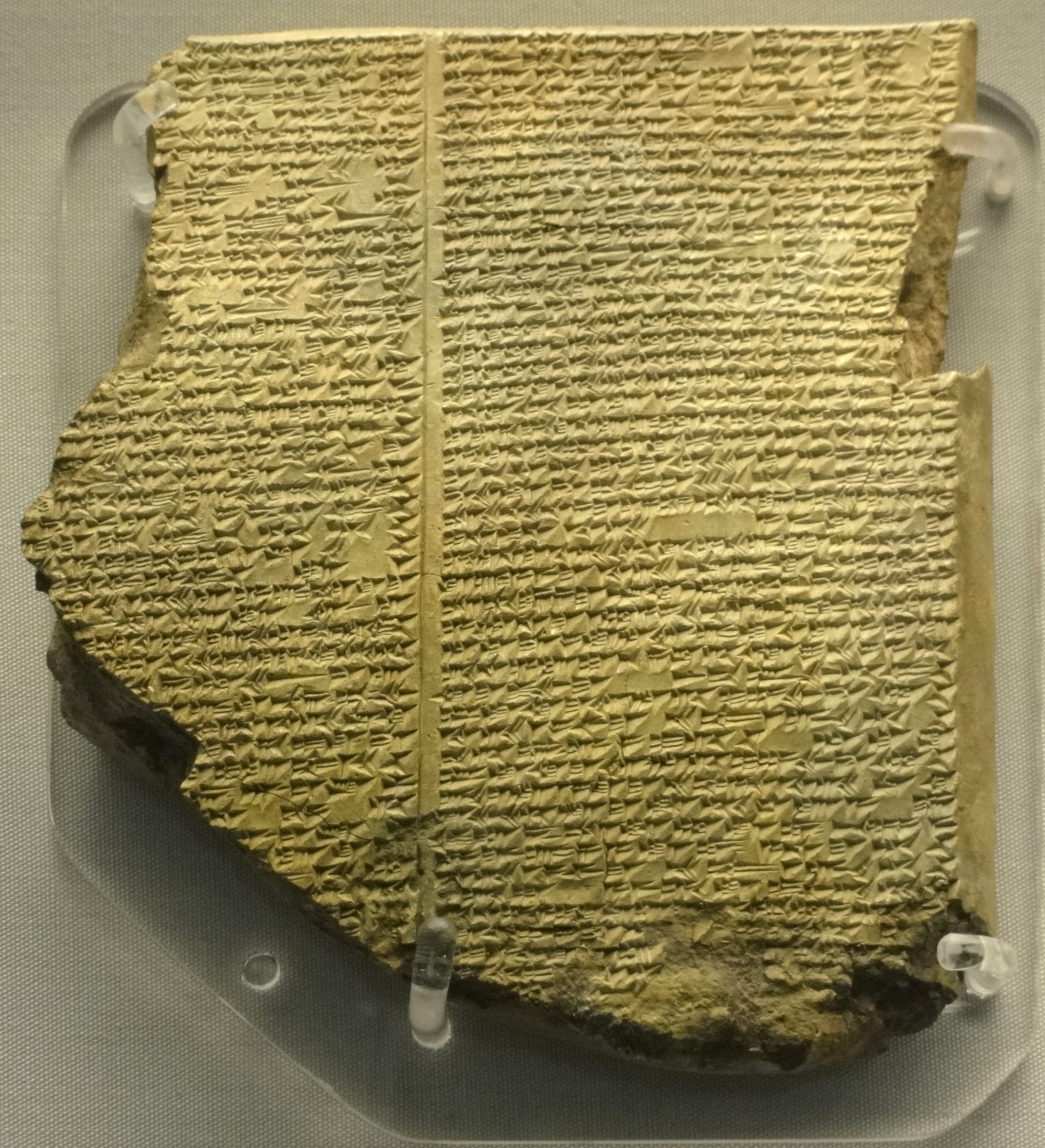
A tablet from the Library of Ashurbanipal, containing a portion of the Epic of Gilgamesh

Ancient Assyrian literature drew heavily on Babylonian literary traditions. Both the Old and Middle Assyrian periods are limited in terms of surviving literary texts. The most important surviving Old Assyrian literary work is Sargon, Lord of Lies, a text found in a well-preserved version on a cuneiform tablet from Kültepe. Once thought to have been a parody, the tale is a first-person narrative of the reign of Sargon of Akkad, the founder of the Akkadian Empire. The text follows Sargon as he gains strength from the god Adad, swears by Ishtar, the "lady of combat", and speaks with the gods. Surviving Middle Assyrian literature is only slightly more diverse.

A distinct Assyrian scholarship tradition, though still drawing on Babylonian tradition, is conventionally placed as beginning around the time of the beginning of the Middle Assyrian period. The rising status of scholarship at this time might be connected to the kings beginning to regard amassing knowledge as a way to strengthen their power. Known Middle Assyrian works include the Tukulti-Ninurta Epic (a narrative of the reign of Tukulti-Ninurta I and his exploits), fragments of other royal epics, The Hunter (a short martial poem) and some royal hymns.

The clear majority of surviving ancient Assyrian literature is from the Neo-Assyrian period. The kings of the Neo-Assyrian Empire began to see preserving knowledge as one of their responsibilities, and not, as previous kings had, a responsibility of private individuals and temples. This development might have originated with the kings no longer viewing the divination performed by their diviners as enough and wished to have access to the relevant texts themselves. The office of chief scholar is first attested in the reign of the Neo-Assyrian king Tukulti-Ninurta II.

Most of the surviving ancient Assyrian literature comes from the Neo-Assyrian Library of Ashurbanipal, which included more than 30,000 documents. Libraries were built in the Neo-Assyrian period to preserve knowledge of the past and maintain scribal culture. Neo-Assyrian texts fall into a wide array of genres, including divinatory texts, divination reports, treatments for the sick (either medical or magical), ritual texts, incantations, prayers and hymns, school texts and literary texts. An innovation of the Neo-Assyrian period were the annals, a genre of texts recording the events of the reigns of a king, particularly military exploits. Annals were disseminated throughout the empire and probably served propagandistic purposes, supporting the legitimacy of the king's rule.

Various purely literary works, previously aligned by scholars with propaganda, are known from the Neo-Assyrian period. Such works include, among others, the Underworld Vision of an Assyrian Crown Prince, the Sin of Sargon and the Marduk Ordeal. In addition to their own works, the Assyrians copied and preserved earlier Mesopotamian literature. The inclusion of texts such as the Epic of Gilgamesh, the Enûma Eliš (the Babylonian creation myth), Erra, the Myth of Etana and the Epic of Anzu in the Library of Ashurbanipal is the primary reason for how such texts have survived to the present day.

== Religion ==
=== Ancient Assyrian religion ===
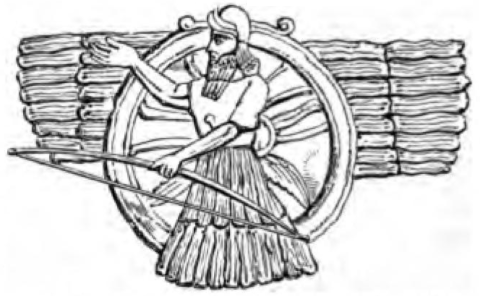
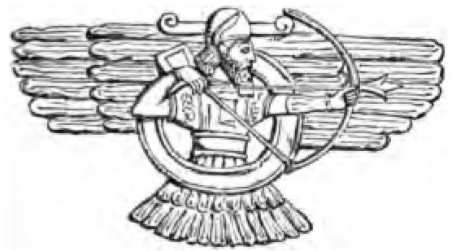
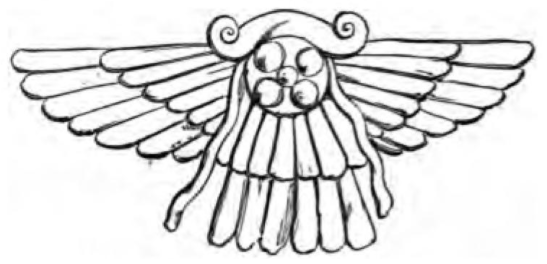
Three symbols of the god Ashur, from reliefs at Nimrud

Knowledge of the ancient polytheistic Assyrian religion, referred to as "Ashurism" by some modern Assyrians, is mostly limited to state cults given that little can be ascertained of the personal religious beliefs and practices of the common people of ancient Assyria. The Assyrians worshipped the same pantheon of gods as the Babylonians in southern Mesopotamia. The chief Assyrian deity was the national deity Ashur. Though the deity and the ancient capital city are commonly distinguished by modern historians through calling the god Ashur and the city Assur, both were inscribed in the exact same way in ancient times (Aššur). In documents from the preceding Old Assyrian period, the city and god are often not clearly differentiated, which suggests that Ashur originated sometime in the Early Assyrian period as a deified personification of the city itself.

Below Ashur, the other Mesopotamian deities were organized in a hierarchy, with each having their own assigned roles (the sun-god Shamash was for instance regarded as a god of justice and Ishtar was seen as a goddess of love and war) and their own primary seats of worship (Ninurta was for instance primarily worshipped at Nimrud and Ishtar primarily at Arbela). Quintessentially Babylonian deities such as Enlil, Marduk, and Nabu were worshipped in Assyria just as much as in Babylonia, and several traditionally Babylonian rituals, such as the akitu festival, were borrowed in the north.

Ashur's role as the chief deity was flexible and changed with the changing culture and politics of the Assyrians themselves. In the Old Assyrian period, Ashur was mainly regarded as a god of death and revival, related to agriculture. Under the Middle and Neo-Assyrian Empire, Ashur's role was expanded and thoroughly altered. Possibly originating as a reaction to the period of suzerainty under the Mittani kingdom, Middle Assyrian theology presented Ashur as a god of war, who bestowed the Assyrian kings not only with divine legitimacy, something retained from the Old Assyrian period, but also commanded the kings to enlarge Assyria ("the land of Ashur") with Ashur's "just scepter", i.e. expand the Assyrian Empire through military conquest.

This militarization of Ashur might also have derived from the Amorite conqueror Shamshi-Adad I equating Ashur with the southern Enlil during his rule over northern Mesopotamia in the 18th and 17th centuries BC. In the Middle Assyrian period, Ashur is attested with the title "king of the gods", a role previous civilizations in both northern and southern Mesopotamia ascribed to Enlil. The development of equating Ashur with Enlil, or at least transferring Enlil's role to Ashur, was paralleled in Babylon, where the previously unimportant local god Marduk was elevated in the reign of Hammurabi (18th century BC) to the head of the pantheon, modelled after Enlil.

Assyrian religion was centered in temples, monumental structures that included a central shrine which housed the cult statue of the temple's god, and several subordinate chapels with space for statues of other deities. Temples were typically self-contained communities; they had their own economic resources, chiefly in the form of land holdings, and their own hierarchically organized personnel. In later times, temples became increasingly dependent on royal benefits, in the shape of specific taxes, offerings and donations of booty and tribute. The head of a temple was titled as the "chief administrator" and was responsible to the Assyrian king since the king was regarded to be Ashur's representative in the mortal world. Records from temples showcase that divination in the form of astrology and extispicy (studying the entrails of dead animals) were important parts of the Assyrian religion since they were believed to be means through which deities communicated with the mortal world.

Unlike many other ancient empires, the Neo-Assyrian Empire did at its height not impose its culture and religion on conquered regions; there were no significant temples built for Ashur outside of northern Mesopotamia. In the post-imperial period, after the fall of the Neo-Assyrian Empire, the Assyrians continued to venerate Ashur and the rest of the pantheon, though without the Assyrian state, religious beliefs in many parts of the Assyrian heartland diverged and developed in different directions. From the time of Seleucid rule over the region (4th to 2nd century BC) onward, there was a strong influence of the ancient Greek religion, with many Greek deities becoming syncretized with Mesopotamian deities. There was also some influence of Judaism, given that the kings of Adiabene, a vassal kingdom covering much of the old Assyrian heartland, converted to Judaism in the 1st century AD.

In the 1st century BC onward, as a frontier region between the Roman and the Parthian empires, Assyria was likely highly religiously complex and diverse. Under Parthian rule, both old and new gods were worshipped at Assur. As late as the time of the city's second destruction in the 3rd century AD, the most important deity was still Ashur, known during this time as Assor or Asor. Worship of Ashur during this time was carried out in the same way as it had been in ancient times, per a cultic calendar effectively identical to that used under the Neo-Assyrian Empire 800 years prior. The ancient Mesopotamian religion persisted in some places for centuries after the end of the post-imperial period, such as at Harran until at least the 10th century (the "Sabians" of Harran) and at Mardin until as late as the 18th century (the Shamsīyah).

=== Christianity ===
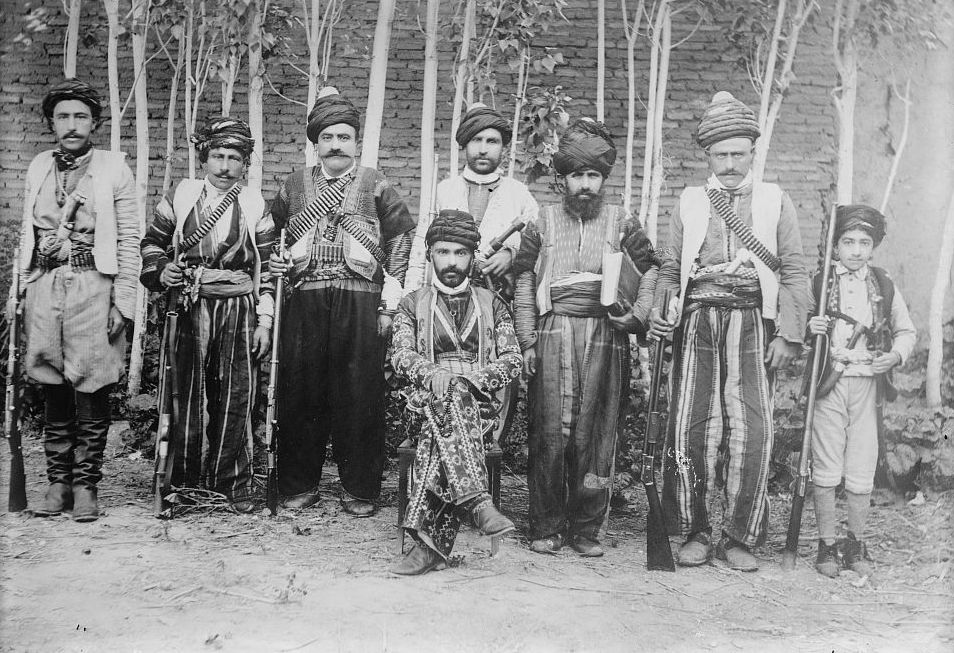
An early 20th-century archbishop of the Assyrian Church of the East, with entourage

The Church of the East developed early in Christian history. Though tradition holds that Christianity was first spread to Mesopotamia by Thomas the Apostle, the exact timespan when the Assyrians were first Christianized is unknown. The city of Arbela was an important early Christian center; according to the later Chronicle of Arbela, Arbela became the seat of a bishop already in AD 100, but the reliability of this document is questioned among scholars. It is however known that both Arbela and Kirkuk later served as important Christian centers in the Sasanian and later Islamic periods.

According to some traditions, Christianity took hold in Assyria when Saint Thaddeus of Edessa converted King Abgar V of Osroene in the mid-1st century AD. From the 3rd century AD onward, it is clear that Christianity was becoming the major religion of the region, with Christ replacing the old Mesopotamian deities. Assyrians had by this time already intellectually contributed to Christian thought; in the 1st century AD, the Christian Assyrian writer Tatian composed the influential Diatessaron, a synoptic rendition of the gospels.

Though Christianity is today an intrinsic part of Assyrian identity, Assyrian Christians have over the centuries splintered into a number of different Christian denominations. The historic Church of the East split in 1552 into rival factions which would by 1830 be consolidated into the modern Chaldean Catholic Church and Assyrian Church of the East. The Assyrian Church of the East would suffer another schism in 1968, resulting in the creation of the Ancient Church of the East. A number of ethnic Assyrians are also a part of the Syriac Catholic Church and the Syriac Orthodox Church. Though these churches have been distinct for centuries, they still follow much of the same liturgical, spiritual and theological foundation of the East Syriac and West Syriac rites respectively. There are also Assyrian followers of various denominations of Protestantism, chiefly due to missions by American missionaries of the Presbyterian Church.

Because the Assyrian Church of the East remains dismissed as "Nestorian" and heretical by many other branches of Christianity, it has not been admitted into the Middle East Council of Churches and it does not take part in the Joint International Commission for Theological Dialogue Between the Catholic Church and the Orthodox Church. This does not mean that efforts to approach ecumenism have not been undertaken. In 1994, Pope John Paul II and Patriarch Dinkha IV signed the Common Christological Declaration Between the Catholic Church and the Assyrian Church of the East, with some further efforts also having been made in the years since.

Historically, the main obstacle in the way of ecumenism has been the ancient text Liturgy of Addai and Mari, used in the Assyrian churches, wherein the anaphora does not contain the Words of Institution, seen as indispensable by the Catholic Church. This obstacle was removed in 2001, when the Catholic Congregation for the Doctrine of the Faith determined that the text could be considered valid in Catholicism as well, despite the absence of the words. Some efforts have also been made to approach reunification of the Assyrian and Chaldean churches. In 1996, Dinkha IV and Patriarch Raphael I Bidawid of the Chaldean Church signed a list of common proposals to move toward unity, approved by synods of both churches in 1997.

== See also ==
- Beth Nahrain
- Beth Garmai
- Assyrian nationalism
- Assyrian genocide
- List of Assyrian settlements
- List of Assyrian tribes
- Assyrian cuisine
