= History of circumcision =

Circumcision likely has ancient roots among several ethnic groups in sub-equatorial Africa, Egypt, and Arabia, though the specific form and extent of circumcision has varied. Ritual male circumcision is known to have been practiced by South Sea Islanders, Aboriginal peoples of Australia, Sumatrans, and some ancient Egyptians.

Today it is still practiced by Jews, Samaritans, Druze, Coptic Christians, (Note: Customary in some Coptic and other churches, indicating that it has been regionally normative since ancient times: "The Coptic Christians in Egypt and the Ethiopian Orthodox Christians— two of the oldest surviving forms of Christianity— retain many of the features of early Christianity, including male circumcision. Circumcision is not prescribed in other forms of Christianity... Some Christian churches in South Africa oppose the practice, viewing it as a pagan ritual, while others, including the Nomiya church in Kenya, require circumcision for membership and participants in focus group discussions in Zambia and Malawi mentioned similar beliefs that Christians should practice circumcision since Jesus was circumcised and the Bible teaches the practice."; "The decision that Christians need not practice circumcision is recorded in Acts 15; there was never, however, a prohibition of circumcision, and it is practiced by Coptic Christians.") Ethiopian Orthodox, Eritrean Orthodox, Muslims, and some tribes in East and Southern Africa. Other countries with significant rates of circumcision include the United States, South Korea, and the Philippines.

As practiced in ancient Egypt and elsewhere in Africa, only part of the foreskin was removed. However, in Judaism and in the United States, the foreskin is often completely removed. Circumcision and/or subincision, often as part of an intricate coming of age ritual, was a common practice among the Aboriginal peoples of Australia and most Pacific islanders at first contact with Western travellers. It is still practiced in the traditional way by some of the population.

Herodotus, writing in the 5th century BCE, lists first of all the Egyptians being the oldest people practicing circumcision then Colchians, Ethiopians, Phoenicians, and Syrians as circumcising cultures.

== Purpose ==
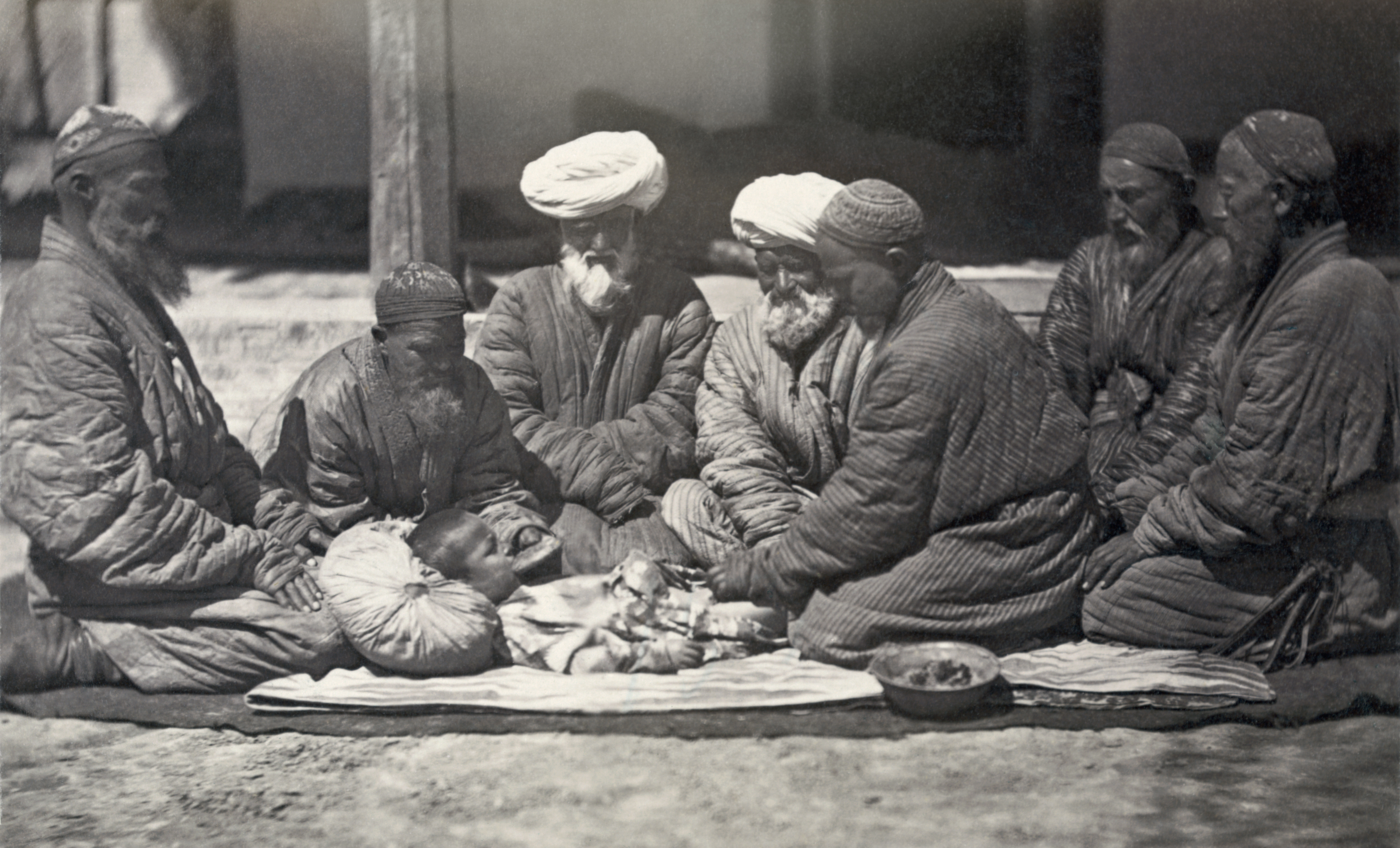
Circumcision being performed in central Asia (probably Turkestan), c. 1865–1872. Restored albumen print.

It has been proposed that circumcision began:

- as a religious sacrifice;
- as a rite of passage marking a boy's entrance into adulthood;
- as a demonstration of one's ability to endure pain;
- as a form of sympathetic magic to ensure virility, fertility, or a good harvest;
- as an aid to hygiene where regular bathing was impractical;
- as a means of marking those of higher social status;
- as a means of humiliating enemies and slaves by symbolic castration;
- as a means of differentiating a circumcising group from their non-circumcising neighbors;
- as a means of discouraging masturbation or other socially proscribed sexual behaviors;
- as a means of increasing a man's attractiveness to women;
- as a male counterpart to menstruation or the breaking of the hymen;
- as a way to make men less feminine;
- to copy the rare natural occurrence of a missing foreskin of an important leader;
- as a way to repel demonesses;
- as a display of disgust of the smegma produced by the foreskin;
- as a form of bloodletting;

Removing the foreskin can prevent or treat a medical condition known as phimosis, although it is not the only treatment. It has been suggested that the custom of circumcision gave advantages to tribes that practiced it and thus led to its spread.

Darby describes these theories as "conflicting", and states that "the only point of agreement among proponents of the various theories is that promoting good health had nothing to do with it." Freud believed that circumcision allows senior men to constrain the incestuous desires of their juniors, and mediates the tension inherent in the father-son relationship and generational succession. Youth are symbolically castrated, or feminized, but also blessed with masculine fruitfulness.

Circumcision may have been practiced among Homo sapiens prior to the Out of Africa migration. As late as 45,000 BCE, modern humans migrated into Australia. Based on iconographic evidence of Australian Aboriginal peoples from the Paleolithic era, circumcision may have been practiced as early as the Paleolithic by these groups.

== Ancient world ==
=== Ancient Africa ===
==== Sahara ====
At Oued Djerat, in Saharan Algeria, engraved rock art with masked bowmen, which could feature male circumcised penises (or penises with retracted foreskins) and may be a scene involving ritual according to some interpretations, have been dated to earlier than 6000 BP amid the Bubaline Period; more specifically, while possibly dating much earlier than 10,000 BP, rock art walls from the Bubaline Period have been dated between 9200 BP and 5500 BP. The cultural practice of circumcision may have spread from the Central Sahara, toward the south in Sub-Saharan Africa and toward the east in the region of the Nile.

==== West Africa ====
The Nomoli figurines, which were created by the Mende people in Sierra Leone and depict male circumcised genitalia,(or penises with retracted foreskins?) have been dated between the 7th century CE and the 8th century CE.

==== Central and East Africa ====
Prior to 300 CE, male circumcision, which is a cultural practice that is part of male initiations, is estimated to have existed in Africa for more than 9000 years. By 300 CE, male initiation and male circumcision had ceased among matrilineal Bantu-speaking peoples in East Africa and Central Africa.

Agatharchides of Cnidus (2nd century BCE) indicated that "troglodyte" ethnic groups practiced circumcision; these groups may have resided along the African coast of the Red Sea in southern Egypt or near the Gulf of Zula in present-day Eritrea; while most of these groups practiced a form of circumcision that involved partial excision, the ethnic group, identified by Agatharchides as the "Colobi" ("the mutilated"), were indicated to have practiced a form of circumcision that involved total excision.

Herodotus (5th century BCE) indicated that ancient Ethiopians practiced circumcision.

==== Southern Africa ====
In the 19th century CE, Shaka, a Zulu king, prohibited male circumcision due to concerns that young circumcised men might be less interested in joining as warriors in the military force he was amassing and uniting in the region of southern Africa and might be more interested in seeking opportunities for having sex.

=== Egypt ===
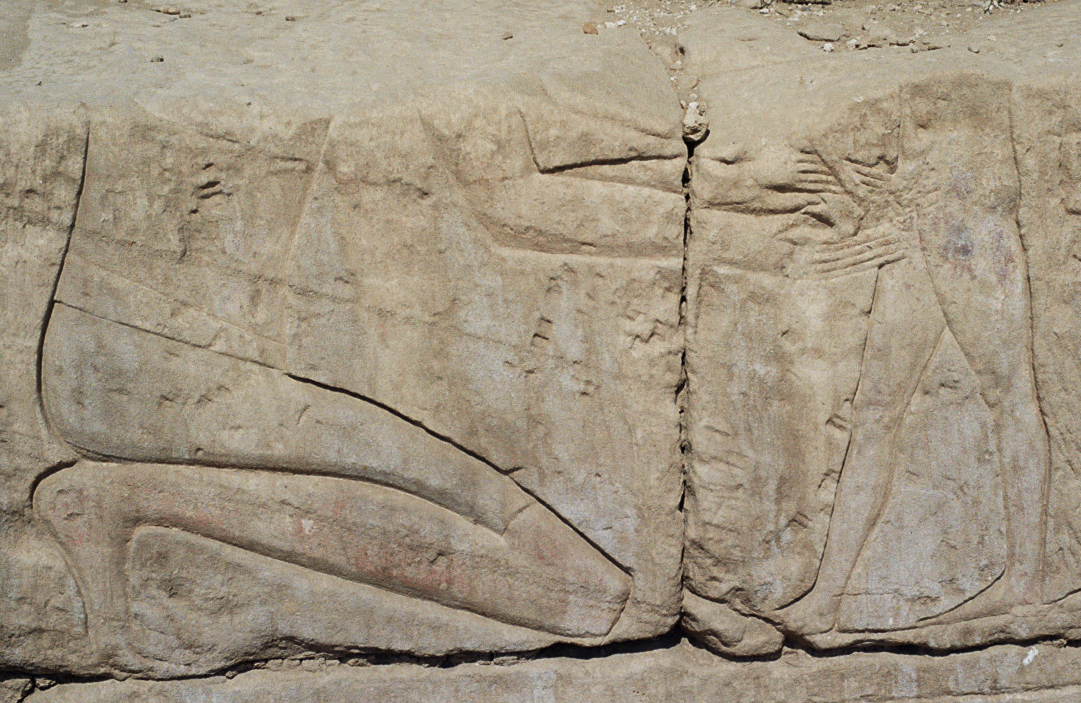
Ancient Egyptian carved scene of circumcision, from the inner northern wall of the Temple of Khonspekhrod at the Precinct of Mut, Luxor, Egypt. Eighteenth dynasty, Amenhotep III, c. 1360 BCE.

According to studies, the Egyptian rite, performed at the age of puberty, did not involve the amputation of an annular piece of the foreskin as in the modern Jewish rite of brit milah. Instead, it would have involved excising a triangular section, or alternately just creating a longitudinal incision, in the dorsal face of the foreskin. In modern terms, this is preputioplasty and/or dorsal slit (superincision). This is supported by artworks and statues showing foreskins, some of which present an incision on the glans, not an annular circumcision.

There is also limited evidence of some individuals with circumcision. The rite may then have changed to circumcision by the time of Herodotus' visit to Egypt.

The rite was performed by priests in a public ceremony using a stone blade. It is thought to have been more popular among the upper echelons of the society, although it was not universal and those lower down the social order are known to have had the procedure done. On the other hand, medical historian Frederick Hodges argues there is evidence against the purported prevalence of circumcision in Egypt, proposing it was limited to priests, functionaries and some workers.

Based on engraved evidence found on walls and evidence from mummies, the rite has been dated to at least as early as 6000 BCE in ancient Egypt. Ancient Egyptian mummies, which have been dated as early as 4000 BCE, show evidence of having undergone the rite.

At the mastaba of Ankhmahor in Saqqara, an engraved wall provides an account of Uha, dated to the 23rd century BCE, which indicates that he and others underwent the rite.

Sixth Dynasty (2345–2181 BCE) tomb artwork in Egypt has been thought to be the oldest documentary evidence of the rite, the most ancient depiction being a bas-relief from the necropolis at Saqqara (c. 2400 BCE). In the oldest written account, by an Egyptian named Uha, in the 23rd century BCE, he describes a mass rite and boasts of his ability to stoically endure the pain: "When I was [circumcised], together with one hundred and twenty men ... there was none thereof who hit out, there was none thereof who was hit, and there was none thereof who scratched and there was none thereof who was scratched."

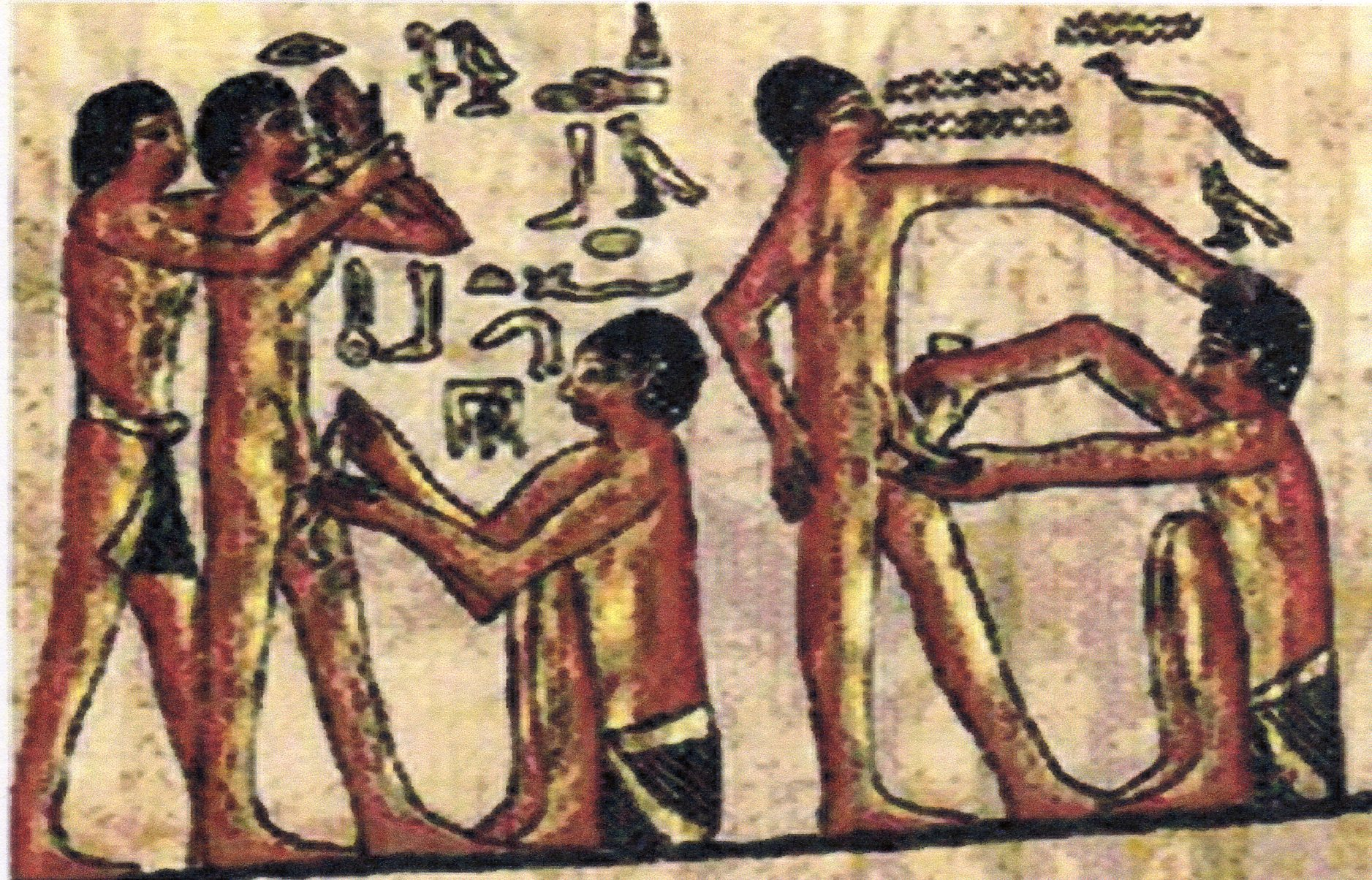
Depiction of the rite (incision or potentially circumcision) in ancient Egypt.

Herodotus, writing in the 5th century BCE, wrote that the Egyptians did not find the outcome to be aesthetically pleasing but that they "practise circumcision for the sake of cleanliness, considering it better to be cleanly than comely."

David Gollaher claimed the rite in ancient Egypt to be a mark of passage from childhood to adulthood. He mentions that the alteration of the body and ritual were supposed to give access to ancient mysteries reserved solely for the initiated (See also Clement of Alexandria, Stromateis 1.15). The content of those mysteries are unclear but are likely to be myths, prayers, and incantations central to Egyptian religion. The Egyptian Book of the Dead, for example, tells of the sun god Ra cutting himself, the blood creating two minor guardian deities. The Egyptologist Emmanuel vicomte de Rougé interpreted this as an act of circumcision.

Strabo and Philo of Alexandria indicated that the ancient Egyptians practiced circumcision. Clement of Alexandria relates that Pythagoras was circumcised by Egyptian priests, as was Thales of Miletus. In the Egyptian Tale of Two Brothers a scene is depicted with one brother appearing to circumcise himself.

Diodorus Siculus and Xanthus of Lydia indicated that female circumcision was also a common custom in ancient Egypt. A papyrus, which was part of the Serapeum's Ptolemaios archive at Memphis and has been dated to 163 BCE, indicated that an ancient Egyptian girl, Tathemis, was scheduled to undergo it.

=== Semitic peoples ===
Circumcision was also adopted by some Semitic peoples living in or around Egypt. Herodotus reported that circumcision is only practiced by the Egyptians, Colchians, Ethiopians, Phoenicians, the 'Syrians of Canaan', and "the Syrians who dwell about the rivers Thermodon and Parthenius, as well as their neighbours the Macronians and Macrones". Sanchuniathon, a purportedly ancient Phoenician writer recorded by Philo of Byblos, tells the origin of circumcision as part of a myth, according to which the god Kronos circumcised himself and his allies to atone for his castration of his father Ouranos. Herodotus also reports, however, that "the Phoenicians, when they come to have commerce with the Greeks, cease to follow the Egyptians in this custom, and allow their children to remain uncircumcised."

In the case of the Phoenicians, it has been proposed that Herodotus and successors like Aristophanes might have mistaken Jews for them, as Biblical sources describe Phoenicians and other peoples like the Philistines as uncircumcised. Roman authors do not mention circumcision in Carthage or other Phoenician settlements in Africa, even though it would have added to the colourful Punic stereotype entertained in Roman literature. Other authors believe Phoenicians abandoned the practice at some point, although it might have not fully died out, as proved by Philo's record.

Josephus seems to suggest that the Edomites were uncircumcised until being forcefully converted to Judaism by John Hyrcanus. It has been also interpreted, however, that up to that point they actually practiced a different kind of genital cutting such as preputioplasty or superincision (dorsal slit) that was later replaced by circumcision.

=== Judaic culture ===
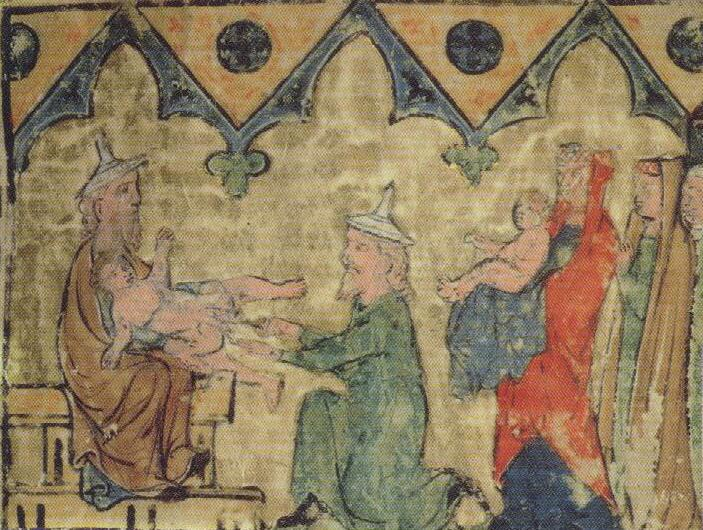
Circumcision of Abraham's son Isaac. Regensburg Pentateuch, Israel Museum, Jerusalem (c. 1300).

According to Genesis, God told Abraham to circumcise himself, his household and his slaves as an everlasting covenant in their flesh. Those who were not circumcised were to be "cut off" from their people. Covenants in biblical times were often sealed by severing an animal, with the implication that the party who breaks the covenant will suffer a similar fate. In Hebrew, kārat berît meaning to seal a covenant translates literally as "cut a covenant". It is presumed by Jewish scholars that the removal of the foreskin symbolically represents such a sealing of the covenant. Moses might not have been circumcised; one of his sons was not, nor were some of his followers while traveling through the desert. Moses's wife Zipporah circumcised their son when God threatened to kill Moses.

=== Hellenistic world ===
According to Hodges, ancient Greek aesthetics of the human form considered circumcision a mutilation of a previously perfectly shaped organ. Greek artwork of the period portrayed penises as covered by the foreskin (sometimes in exquisite detail), except in the portrayal of satyrs, lechers, and barbarians. Negative evaluations of the aesthetic outcome of the procedure may have led to a decline in the incidence of circumcision among many peoples that had previously practiced it throughout Hellenistic times.

In Egypt, only the priestly caste retained circumcision, and by the 2nd century, the only circumcising groups in the Roman Empire were Jews, Samaritans, Jewish Christians, Egyptian priests, and the Nabatean Arabs. Circumcision was sufficiently rare among non-Jews that being circumcised was considered conclusive evidence of Judaism (or Early Christianity and others derogatorily called Judaizers) in Roman courts—Suetonius in Domitian 12.2 described a court proceeding (from "my youth") in which a ninety-year-old man was stripped naked before the court to determine whether he was evading the tax placed on Jews and Judaizers.

Cultural pressures to circumcise operated throughout the Hellenistic world: when the Judean king John Hyrcanus conquered the Idumeans, he forced them to become circumcised and convert to Judaism, but their ancestors the Edomites had practiced circumcision in pre-Hellenistic times.

Some Jews tried to hide their circumcision status, as told in 1 Maccabees. This was mainly for social and economic benefits and also so that they could exercise in gymnasiums and compete in sporting events. Techniques for restoring the appearance of an uncircumcised penis were known by the 2nd century BCE. In one such technique, a copper weight (called the Judeum pondum) was hung from the remnants of the circumcised foreskin until, in time, they became sufficiently stretched to cover the glans. The 1st-century writer Aulus Cornelius Celsus described two surgical techniques for foreskin restoration in his medical treatise De Medicina. In one of these, the skin of the penile shaft was loosened by cutting in around the base of the glans. The skin was then stretched over the glans and allowed to heal, giving the appearance of an uncircumcised penis. This was possible because the Abrahamic covenant of circumcision defined in the Bible was a relatively minor circumcision; named milah, this involved cutting off the foreskin that extended beyond the glans. Jewish religious writers denounced such practices as abrogating the covenant of Abraham in 1 Maccabees and the Talmud. During the 2nd century, the procedure of circumcision changed in order to become irreversible. The historical term for foreskin restoration was epispasm.

Later during the Talmudic period (500–625 CE) a third step, known as Metzitzah, began to be practiced. In this step the mohel would suck the blood from the circumcision wound with his mouth to remove what was believed to be bad excess blood. As it actually increases the likelihood of infections such as tuberculosis and venereal diseases, modern day mohels use a glass tube placed over the infant's penis for suction of the blood. In many Jewish ritual circumcisions this step of Metzitzah has been eliminated.

First Maccabees tells us that the Seleucids forbade the practice of brit milah, and punished those who performed it – as well as the infants who underwent it – with death.

The 1st-century Jewish author Philo Judaeus (20 BCE – 50 CE) defended Jewish circumcision on several grounds, including health, cleanliness and fertility. He also thought that circumcision should be done as early as possible as it would not be as likely to be done by someone's own free will. He claimed that the foreskin prevented semen from reaching the vagina and so should be done as a way to increase the nation's population. He also noted that circumcision should be performed as an effective means to reduce sexual pleasure: "The legislators thought good to dock the organ which ministers to such intercourse thus making circumcision the symbol of excision of excessive and superfluous pleasure." There was also division in Pharisaic Judaism between Hillel the Elder and Shammai on the issue of circumcision of proselytes.

Flavius Josephus in Jewish Antiquities book 20, chapter 2 records the story of King Izates who having been persuaded by a Jewish merchant named Ananias to embrace the Jewish religion, decided to get circumcised so as to follow Jewish law. Despite being reticent for fear of reprisals from his non-Jewish subjects he was eventually persuaded to do it by a Galileean Jew named Eleazar on the grounds that it was one thing to read the Law and another thing to practice it. Despite his mother Helen and Ananias's fear of the consequences, Josephus said that God looked after Izates and his reign was peaceful and blessed.

=== Medieval Judaism ===
The Jewish philosopher Maimonides (1135–1204) insisted that faith should be the only reason for circumcision. He recognised that it was "a very hard thing" to have done to oneself but that it was done to "quell all the impulses of matter" and "perfect what is defective morally." Sages at the time had recognised that the foreskin heightened sexual pleasure. Maimonides reasoned that the bleeding and loss of protective covering rendered the penis weakened and in so doing had the effect of reducing a man's lustful thoughts and making sex less pleasurable. He also warned that it is "hard for a woman with whom an uncircumcised man has had sexual intercourse to separate from him."

A 13th-century French disciple of Maimonides, Isaac ben Yediah, claimed that circumcision was an effective way of reducing a woman's sexual desire. With a non-circumcised man, he said, she always orgasms first and so his sexual appetite is never fulfilled, but with a circumcised man she receives no pleasure and hardly ever orgasms "because of the great heat and fire burning in her."

=== Decline in Christianity ===
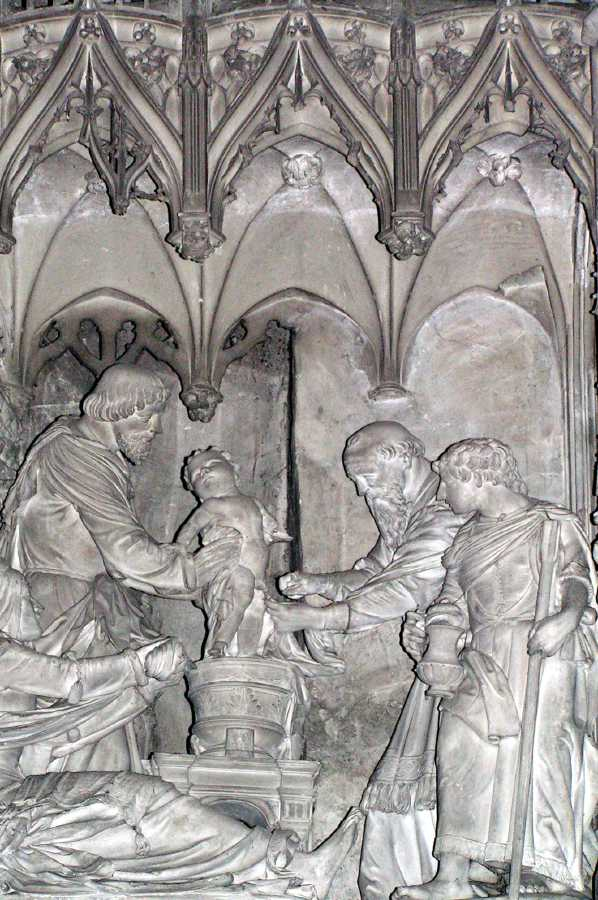
Although Jesus was circumcised (according to the Gospel of Luke, depicted in this sculpture at the Cathedral of Chartres) early Christians soon dispensed with the ritual.

The Council of Jerusalem in Acts of the Apostles 15 addressed the issue of whether circumcision was required of new converts to Christianity. Both Simon Peter and James the Just spoke against requiring circumcision in Gentile converts and the Council ruled that circumcision was not necessary. However, Acts 16 and many references in the Letters of Paul show that the practice was not immediately eliminated. Paul of Tarsus, who was said to be directly responsible for one man's circumcision in Acts 16:1–3 and who appeared to praise Jewish circumcision in Romans 3:2, said that circumcision didn't matter in 1 Corinthians 7:19 and then increasingly turned against the practice, accusing those who promoted circumcision of wanting to make a good showing in the flesh and boasting or glorying in the flesh in Galatians 6:11–13. In a later letter, Philippians 3:2, he is reported as warning Christians to beware the "mutilation". Circumcision was so closely associated with Jewish men that Jewish Christians were referred to as "those of the circumcision" (e.g. Colossians 3:20) or conversely Christians who were circumcised were referred to as Jewish Christians or Judaizers. These terms (circumcised/uncircumcised) are generally interpreted to mean Jews and Greeks, who were predominant; however, it is an oversimplification as 1st-century Iudaea Province also had some Jews who no longer circumcised and some Greeks (called Proselytes or Judaizers) who did, (along with a few Nabataean Arabs Judaized by Hasmoneans, Ethiopians, and the rare Egyptian priest). According to the Gospel of Thomas saying 53, Jesus says:

"His disciples said to him, "is circumcision useful or not?" He said to them, "If it were useful, their father would produce children already circumcised from their mother. Rather, the true circumcision in spirit has become profitable in every respect."" SV

Parallels to Thomas 53 are found in Paul's Romans 2:29, Philippians 3:3, 1 Corinthians 7:19, Galatians 6:15, Colossians 2:11–12.

In John's Gospel 7:23 Jesus is reported as giving this response to those who criticized him for healing on the Sabbath:

Now if a man can be circumcised on the sabbath so that the Law of Moses is not broken, why are you angry with me for making a man whole and complete on a sabbath? ( Jerusalem Bible)

This passage has been seen as a comment on the Rabbinic belief that circumcision heals the penis (Jerusalem Bible, note to John 7:23) or as a criticism of circumcision.

Europeans, with the exception of the Jews, did not practice circumcision. A rare exception occurred in Visigothic Spain, where during the armed campaign king Wamba ordered circumcision of everyone who committed atrocities against the civilian population. The practice, on the other hand, is customary among the Coptic, Ethiopian, and Eritrean Orthodox Churches, and also some other African churches.

As part of an attempted reconciliation of Coptic and Catholic practices, the Catholic Church condemned the observance of circumcision as a moral sin and ordered against its practice in the Council of Basel-Florence in 1442. According to UNAIDS, the papal bull of Union with The Copts issued during that council stated that circumcision was merely unnecessary for Christians; El-Hout and Khauli, however, regard it as condemnation of the procedure. The Catholic Church currently maintains a neutral position on the practice of non-religious circumcision, as the church has a policy of inculturation.

In the 18th century, Edward Gibbon referred to circumcision as a "singular mutilation" practised only by Jews and Turks and as "a painful and often dangerous rite" ... (R. Darby)

In 1753 in London there was a proposal for Jewish emancipation. It was furiously opposed by the pamphleteers of the time, who spread the fear that Jewish emancipation meant universal circumcision. Men were urged to protect:

"the best of Your property" and guard their threatened foreskins(!). It was an extraordinary outpouring of popular beliefs about sex, fears about masculinity and misconceptions about Jews, but also a striking indication of how central to their sexual identity men considered their foreskins at that time. (R.Darby)

These negative attitudes remained well into the 19th century. English explorer Sir Richard Burton observed that "Christendom practically holds circumcision in horror". However, starting in the last half of the 19th century, circumcision became common among Christians in the Western World, especially in some Anglosphere countries. Today many Christian denominations are neutral about ritual male circumcision, not requiring it for religious observance, but neither forbidding it for cultural or other reasons. Today male circumcision is commonly practiced in a number of predominantly Christian countries and Christian communities. The United States and the Philippines are the largest majority Christian countries in the world to extensively practice circumcision. Christian communities in some Anglosphere countries, Oceania, South Korea, the Philippines, the Middle East and Africa have high circumcision rates, while Christian communities in the United Kingdom, Europe and South America have low circumcision rates.

== Rise and fall in the English-speaking world ==
Negative evaluation of circumcision as an unnecessary or culturally-bound practice was the norm for much of the 19th century. On circumcision in the Encyclopædia Britannica, the ninth edition published in 1876, discusses the practice as a religious rite among Jews, Muslims, the ancient Egyptians and tribal peoples in various parts of the world. The author of the entry rejected sanitary explanations of the procedure in favour of a religious one: "like other body mutilations ... [it is] of the nature of a representative sacrifice".

In the latter part of the century in the English-speaking world, circumcision began to be promoted for various ailments as a medical intervention. In the 1910 entry of the Encyclopædia Britannica it stated:

"This surgical operation, which is commonly prescribed for purely medical reasons, is also an initiation or religious ceremony among Jews and Muslims".

Prescription for medical use by these societies led to biomedicalization of circumcision as medical procedure and then secondarily as a religious ritual. Motivations and explanations for circumcision and its origin being motivated by health benefits thus followed and became the norm. This is evidenced in the same entry, stating that "in recent years the medical profession has been responsible for its considerable extension among other than Jewish children ... for reasons of health" (11th edition, Vol. 6).

In 1929, the entry is much reduced in size and consists merely of a brief description of the operation, which is "done as a preventive measure in the infant" and "performed chiefly for purposes of cleanliness". Readers are then referred to the entries for 'Mutilation' and 'Deformation' for a discussion of circumcision in its religious context, showing a continued negative evaluation for the practice, reflecting limited use and rarity among the general populace.

Widespread adoption of the practice as surgical procedure occurred under the growing belief in the Anglophone medical community of its efficacy in reducing the risk of contracting sexually-transmitted diseases, such as syphilis. Sexually transmitted diseases were rampant in societies of this era and a cause of death prior to the advent of antibiotics in the 20th century. A second motivation was the belief circumcision could lessen sexual urges and reduce the ease of masturbation, referred to as 'self-pollution' and 'self-abuse'.

Circumcision rose in incidence before falling in most Western and Anglophonic societies during the 20th century, with the exception of the United States.

=== Medical concerns ===
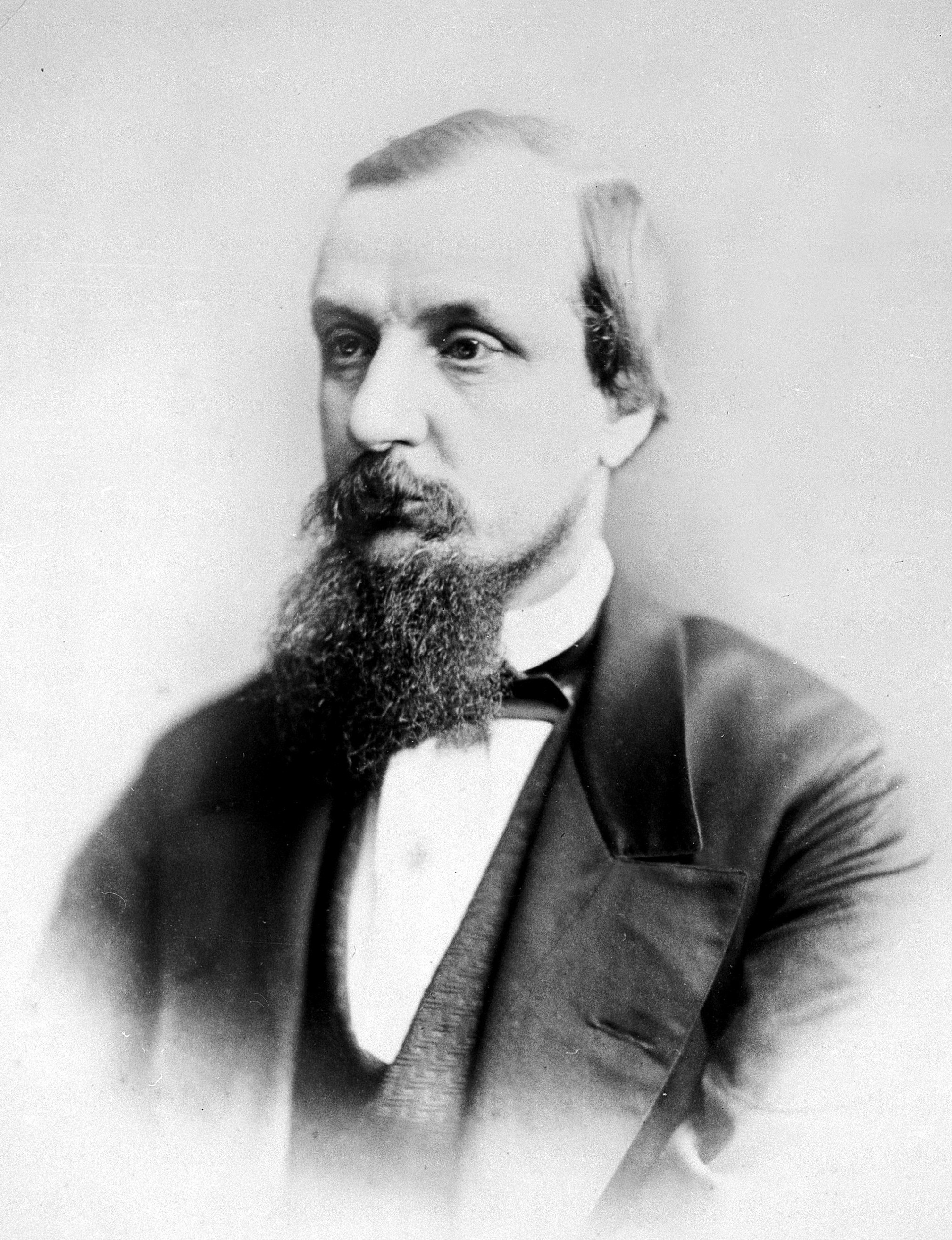
Jonathan Hutchinson was the first prominent medical advocate for circumcision.

The first medical doctor to advocate for the adoption of circumcision was the eminent English physician, Jonathan Hutchinson. In 1855, he published a study in which he compared the rate of contraction of venereal disease amongst the gentile and Jewish population of London. Although his manipulation and usage of the data has since been shown to have been flawed (the protection that Jews appear to have are more likely due to cultural factors), his study appeared to demonstrate that circumcised men were significantly less vulnerable to such disease. (A 2006 systematic review concluded that the evidence "strongly indicates that circumcised men are at lower risk of chancroid and syphilis.")

Hutchinson was a notable leader in the campaign for medical circumcision for the next fifty years, publishing A plea for circumcison in the British Medical Journal (1890), where he contended that the foreskin "... constitutes a harbour for filth, and is a constant source of irritation. It conduces to masturbation, and adds to the difficulties of sexual continence. It increases the risk of syphilis in early life, and of cancer in the aged." As can be seen, he was also a convert to the idea that circumcision would prevent masturbation, a great Victorian concern. In an 1893 article, On circumcision as a preventive of masturbation he wrote: "I am inclined to believe that [circumcision] may often accomplish much, both in breaking the habit [of masturbation] as an immediate result, and in diminishing the temptation to it subsequently."

Nathaniel Heckford, a paediatrician at the East London Hospital for Children, wrote Circumcision as a Remedial Measure in Certain Cases of Epilepsy, Chorea, etc. (1865), in which he argued that circumcision acted as an effective remedial measure in the prevention of certain cases of epilepsy and chorea.

These increasingly common medical beliefs were even applied to females. The controversial obstetrical surgeon Isaac Baker Brown founded the London Surgical Home for Women in 1858, where he worked on advancing surgical procedures. In 1866, Baker Brown described the use of clitoridectomy, the removal of the clitoris, as a cure for several conditions, including epilepsy, catalepsy and mania, which he attributed to masturbation. In On the Curability of Certain Forms of Insanity, Epilepsy, Catalepsy, and Hysteria in Females, he gave a 70 per cent success rate using this treatment.

However, during 1866, Baker Brown began to receive negative feedback from within the medical profession from doctors who opposed the use of clitoridectomies and questioned the validity of Baker Brown's claims of success. An article appeared in The Times in December, which was favourable towards Baker Brown's work but suggested that Baker Brown had treated women of unsound mind. He was also accused of performing clitoridectomies without the consent or knowledge of his patients or their families. In 1867 he was expelled from the Obstetrical Society of London for carrying out the operations without consent. Baker Brown's ideas were more accepted in the United States, where, from the 1860s, the operation was being used to cure hysteria, nymphomania, and in young girls what was called "rebellion" or "unfeminine aggression".

Lewis Sayre, New York orthopedic surgeon, became a prominent advocate for circumcision in America. In 1870, he examined a five-year-old boy who was unable to straighten his legs, and whose condition had so far defied treatment. Upon noting that the boy's genitals were inflamed, Sayre hypothesized that chronic irritation of the boy's foreskin had paralyzed his knees via reflex neurosis. Sayre circumcised the boy, and within a few weeks, he recovered from his paralysis. After several additional incidents in which circumcision also appeared effective in treating paralyzed joints, Sayre began to promote circumcision as a powerful orthopedic remedy. Sayre's prominence within the medical profession allowed him to reach a wide audience.

As more practitioners tried circumcision as a treatment for otherwise intractable medical conditions, sometimes achieving positive results, the list of ailments reputed to be treatable through circumcision grew. By the 1890s, hernia, bladder infections, kidney stones, insomnia, chronic indigestion, rheumatism, epilepsy, asthma, bedwetting, Bright's disease, erectile dysfunction, syphilis, insanity, and skin cancer had all been linked to the foreskin, and many physicians advocated universal circumcision as a preventive health measure.

Specific medical arguments aside, several hypotheses have been raised in explaining the public's acceptance of infant circumcision as preventive medicine. The success of the germ theory of disease had not only enabled physicians to combat many of the postoperative complications of surgery, but had made the wider public deeply suspicious of dirt and bodily secretions. Accordingly, the smegma that collects under the foreskin was viewed as unhealthy, and circumcision readily accepted as good penile hygiene. Secondly, moral sentiment of the day regarded masturbation as not only sinful, but also physically and mentally unhealthy, stimulating the foreskin to produce the host of maladies of which it was suspected. In this climate, circumcision could be employed as a means of discouraging masturbation. All About the Baby, a popular parenting book of the 1890s, recommended infant circumcision for precisely this purpose. (However, a survey of 1410 men in the United States in 1992, Laumann found that circumcised men were more likely to report masturbating at least once a month.) As hospitals proliferated in urban areas, childbirth, at least among the upper and middle classes, was increasingly under the care of physicians in hospitals rather than with midwives in the home. It has been suggested that once a critical mass of infants were being circumcised in the hospital, circumcision became a class marker of those wealthy enough to afford a hospital birth.

During the same time period, circumcision was becoming easier to perform. William Stewart Halsted's 1885 discovery of hypodermic cocaine as a local anaesthetic made it easier for doctors without expertise in the use of chloroform and other general anaesthetics to perform minor surgeries. Also, several mechanically aided circumcision techniques, forerunners of modern clamp-based circumcision methods, were first published in the medical literature of the 1890s, allowing surgeons to perform circumcisions more safely and successfully.

Born in the United Kingdom during the late 19th century, John Maynard Keynes and his brother Geoffrey, were both circumcised in boyhood due to parents' concern about their masturbatory habits. Some mainstream pediatric manuals continued to recommend circumcision as a deterrent against masturbation until the 1950s, and a 1970 edition of the standard US urology textbook said "Parents readily ... adopt measures which may avert masturbation. Circumcision is usually advised on these grounds."

=== Spread and decline ===
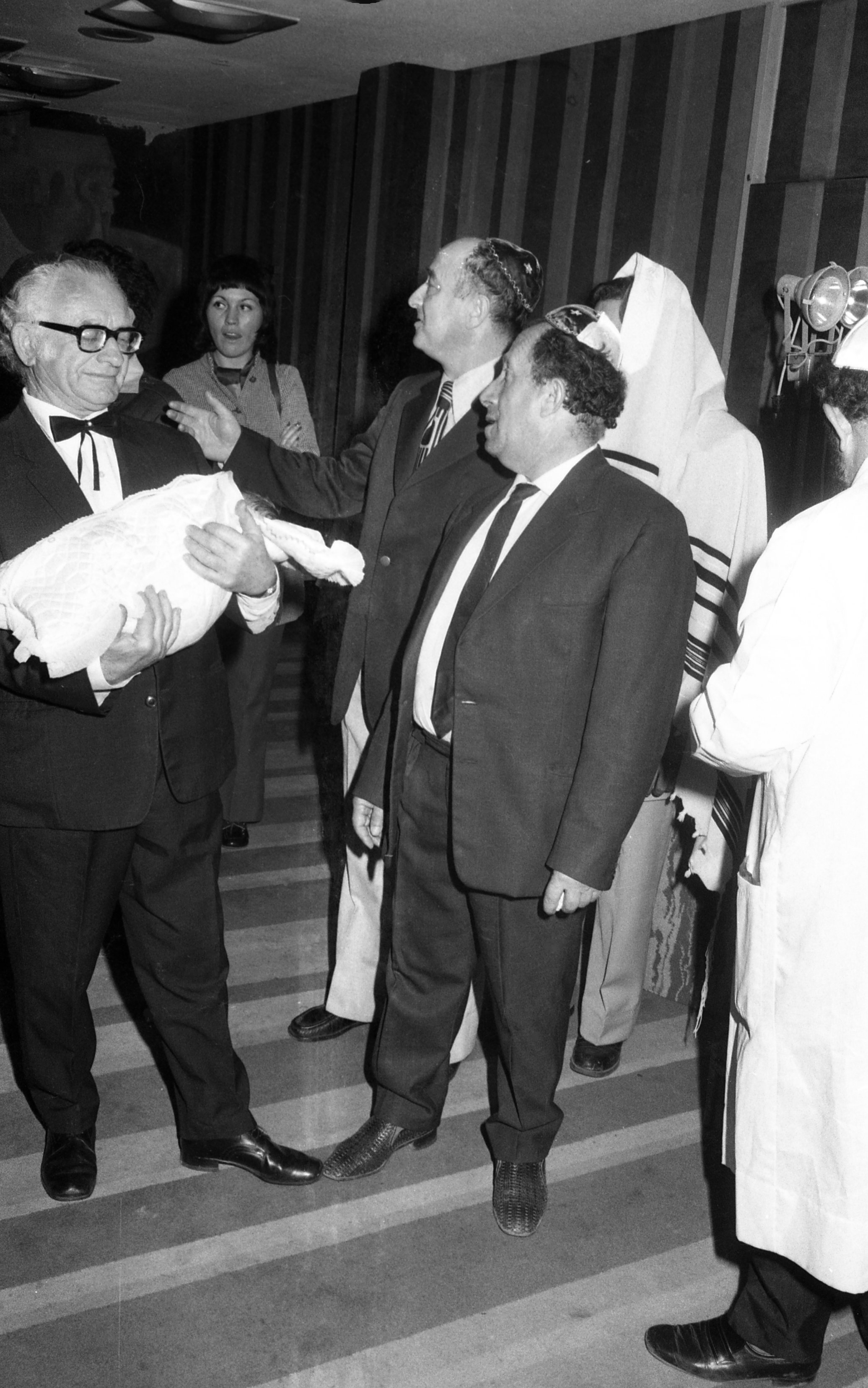
Simcha Holtzberg, a prominent supporter of wounded IDF soldiers, presiding over a circumcision ceremony for a veteran's child, Israel, 1973.

Infant circumcision was taken up in the United Kingdom, the United States, Australia, New Zealand, and the English-speaking parts of Canada and South Africa. Although it is difficult to determine historical circumcision rates, one estimate of infant circumcision rates in the United States holds that 30% of newborn American boys were being circumcised in 1900, 55% in 1925, 72% in 1950, 85% in 1975 and 60% in 2000.

In South Korea, circumcision was largely unknown before the establishment of the United States trusteeship in 1945 and the spread of American influence. More than 90% of South Korean high school boys are now circumcised at an average age of 12 years, which makes South Korea a unique case. However circumcision rates are now declining in South Korea. Circumcision rates in North Korea are less than 1%.

Decline in circumcision in the English-speaking world began in the postwar period. The British paediatrician Douglas Gairdner published a famous study in 1949, The fate of the foreskin, described as "a model of perceptive and pungent writing." It revealed that for the years 1942–1947, about 16 children per year in England and Wales had died because of circumcision, a rate of about 1 per 6000 circumcisions. The article had an influential impact on medical practice and public opinion.

In 1949, a lack of consensus in the medical community as to whether circumcision carried with it any notable health benefit motivated the United Kingdom's newly formed National Health Service to remove infant circumcision from its list of covered services. Since then, circumcision has been an out-of-pocket cost to parents, and the proportion of circumcised men is around 9%.

Similar trends have operated in Canada, (where public medical insurance is universal, and where private insurance does not replicate services already paid from the public purse) individual provincial health insurance plans began delisting non-therapeutic circumcision in the 1980s. Manitoba was the final province to delist non-therapeutic circumcision, which occurred in 2005. The practice has also declined to about nine per cent of newborn boys in Australia and is almost unknown in New Zealand.

== See also ==
- Female genital mutilation
- Children's rights
- Circumcision controversies
- Ethics of circumcision
- Prevalence of circumcision
- Bioethics of neonatal circumcision
