= Abia =

Abia or ABIA may refer to:

== People ==
- Abia (name)
- Abia (mythology), the nursemaid of Glenus, the son of Heracles

== Places ==
=== Nigeria ===
- Abia State, state in southeastern Nigeria
  - Abia State University
  - Abia State Polytechnic
  - Abia Warriors F.C., based in the city of Umuahia, Abia State

=== Spain ===
- Abia de las Torres, a municipality in the province of Palencia, Castile and León, Spain
- Abia de la Obispalía, a municipality in Cuenca, Castile-La Mancha, Spain

=== Elsewhere ===
- Abia Community, a constituency and community council in the Maseru Municipality in the Maseru District of Lesotho
- Abia (Messenia), town of ancient Messenia, now occupied by Avia, Messenia, Peloponnese, Greece
- Austin-Bergstrom International Airport, in Austin, Texas, US

== Other uses ==
- Abia (sawfly), genus of conifer-feeding sawflies
- Australian Book Industry Awards, national literary and industry awards

== See also ==
- Abias, a saint of the Coptic Church
