= Tombs of the Kings (Jerusalem) =

1st-century burial site in East Jerusalem

- Tombeau des Rois (French); قبور السلاطين (Arabic); קברי המלכים (Hebrew)
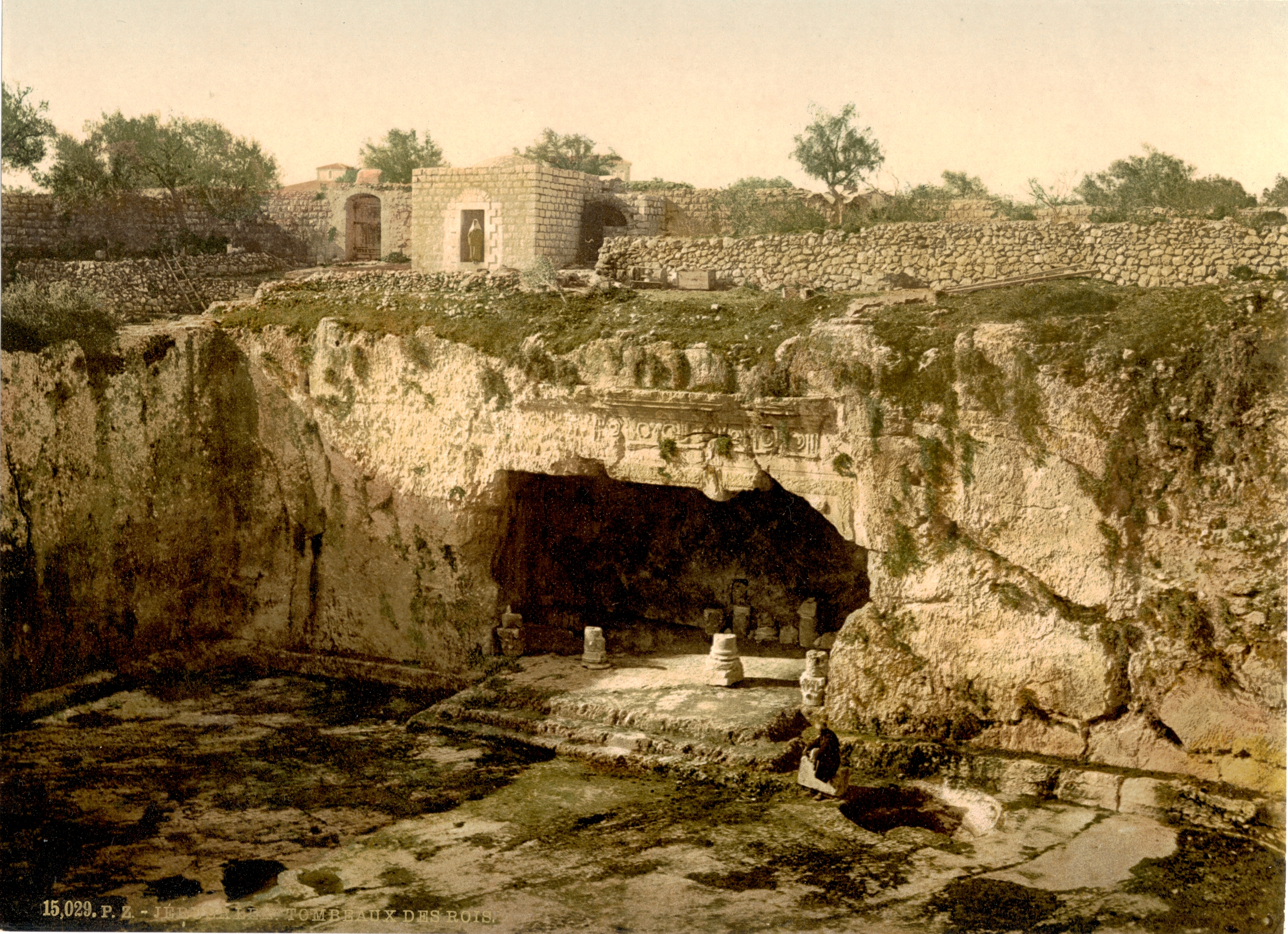
- Tombs of the Kings in the 1890s
- Click on the map for a fullscreen view
- 31.78852°N 35.22919°E
- Type: Catacombs
- Location: East Jerusalem

Site notes
- Governing body: state property of France (Note: The French state owns multiple religious properties in East Jerusalem under historical religious and diplomatic duties to protect Christian sites in the Holy Land. The official stance of France is for a two-state solution and has advocated for corpus separatum for the city of Jerusalem. This property is held under extraterritoriality but it is not sovereign land or a territorial possession of France.)

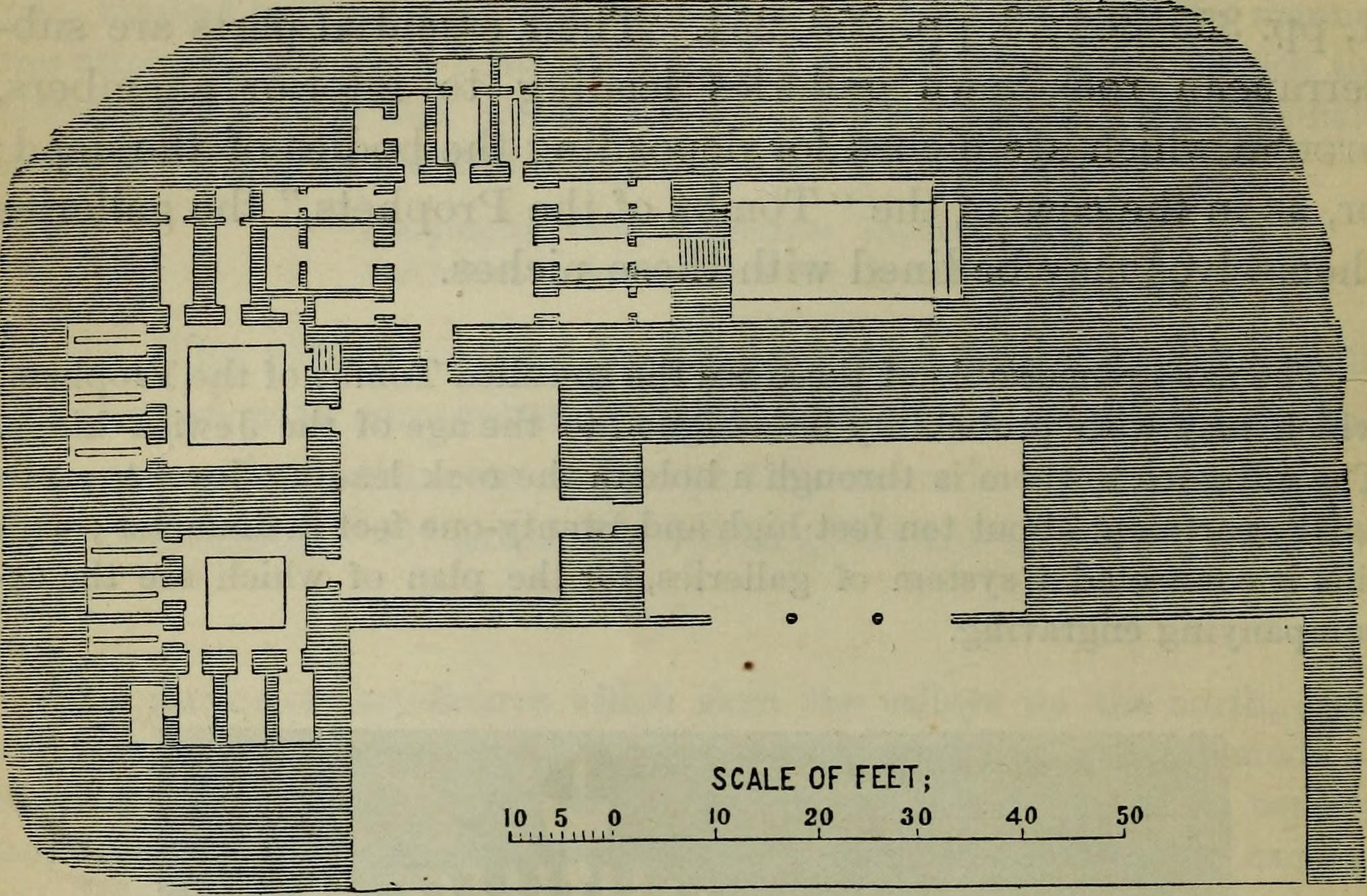
Plan of the Tomb of the Kings 1872

The Tombs of the Kings (Hebrew: קברי המלכים Kivere HaMelakhim; Arabic: قبور السلاطين; French: Tombeau des Rois) are a rock-cut funerary complex in East Jerusalem believed to be the burial site of Queen Helene of Adiabene (died c. 50–56 CE), hence: Helena's Monuments. The tombs are located 820 m (2,690 ft) north of Jerusalem's Old City walls in the Sheikh Jarrah neighborhood (שכונת שייח ג'ראח; Arabic: حي الشيخ جرّاح)

The grandeur of the site led to the belief that the tombs had once been the burial place of the kings of Judah, hence the name Tombs of the Kings; but the tombs are now associated with Queen Helena of Adiabene. According to this theory, Queen Helena chose the site to bury her son Isates and others of her dynasty. More recent research by noted French scholar and Dominican friar Jean-Baptiste Humbert has concluded that the tomb was likely designed for Herod Agrippa I, the grandson of Herod the Great.

The site is located east of the intersection of Nablus Road and Saladin Street. The gate of the property is marked "Tombeau des Rois", French for "Tomb of the Kings."

== Public access ==
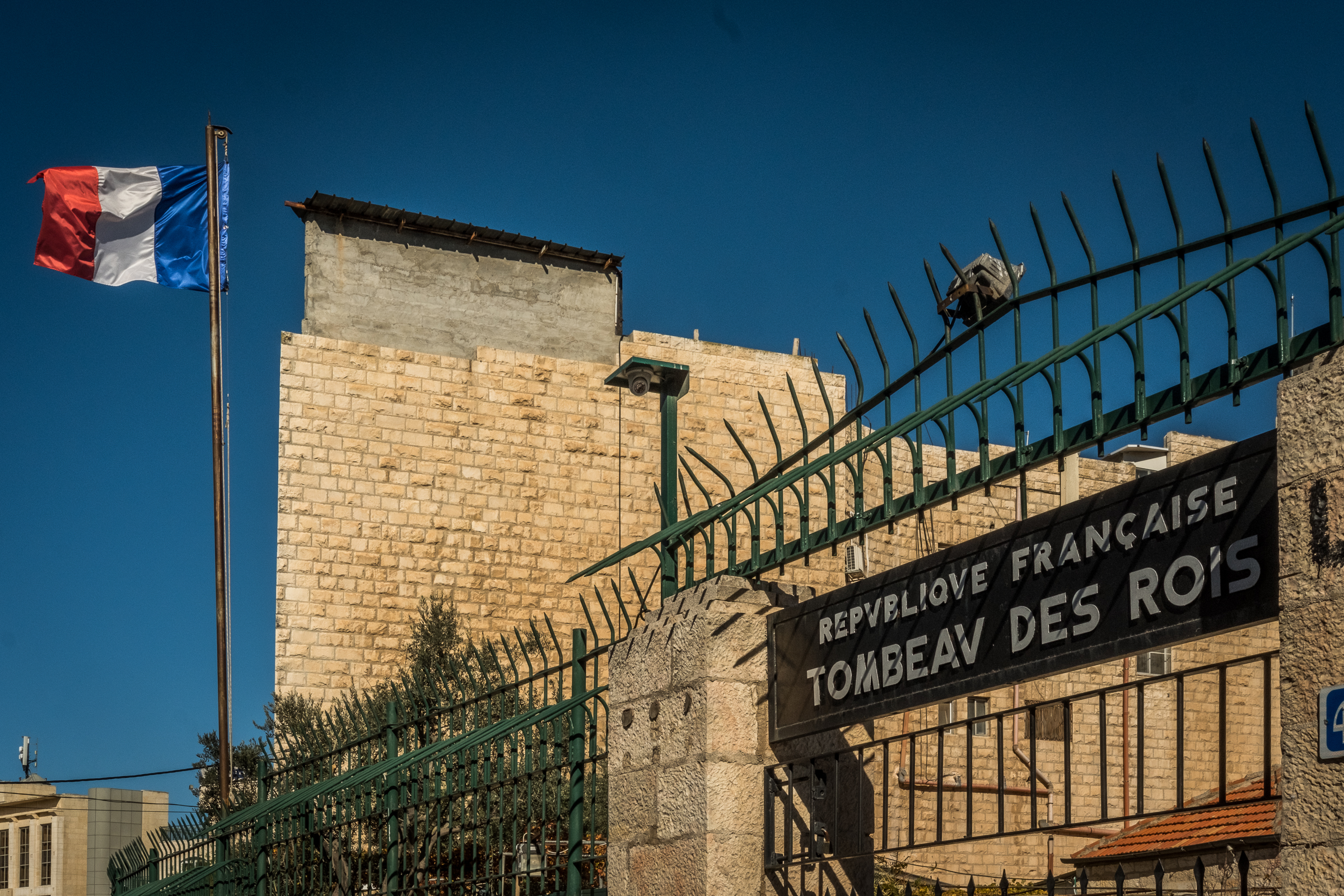
Tomb of the Kings gate

In 2009 the site was closed to the public to facilitate a restoration project.

On 15 May 2019, Hekdesh, a Jewish organisation (Association Hekdesh du Tombeau des rois), hired Gilles-William Goldnadel, a French lawyer, and took the French government to court. Goldnadel tried to prove that the site, after being purchased in 1878 by a French-Jewish woman, Berthe Amélie Bertrand, or by the brothers Péreire, French-Jewish bankers, was left to the French state on condition that the Jews would preserve the right to visit the site (see below at History). Goldnadel also hopes to reclaim the sarcophagus of queen Helena of Adiabene, presently housed at the Louvre.

On June 27, 2019, the French consulate in Jerusalem reopened the site to visitors purchasing tickets in advance. The site was closed after protests at the site by ultra-Orthodox Jews who wanted to pray there, because they said it is the burial place of important historical individuals, among them the father-in-law of Rabbi Akiva. As of May 2024, the site was under renovation.

== General layout ==
From street level a hewn staircase, measuring 9 metres (30 ft) in width and having a length of 30 metres (98 ft), descends into a carved courtyard. Alongside the staircase there is built a drainage system and cisterns. The main courtyard sinks down to a depth of 8.5 metres (28 ft) within the bedrock and has a total measurement of approximately 27 metres (89 ft) x 26 metres (85 ft). The portal is on its western façade and is ascended by a flight of three steps. In front of the burial cave formerly stood two pillars and two pilasters carved in the rock face and which are now scarcely visible. Above the portal is a Doric frieze, made of metopes and triglyphs, with a cluster of grapes in the center and wreaths of acanthus leaves next to it. A leaf plexus extends along the architrave.

The inner tomb is made-up of a complex labyrinth consisting of eight chambers, with a total of 48 burial niches, some of which formerly contained decorated sarcophagi. The chambers of the royal tomb are made with both kokhim (burial niches) in the old Jewish style, and arcosolia in the Roman fashion.

== History ==
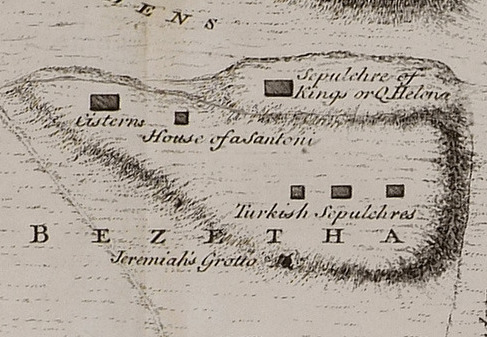
Detail from Richard Pococke's 1745 A Plan of Jerusalem and the Adjacent Country, showing both names for the site

=== Queen Helena of Adiabene ===
The tomb is mentioned by the Roman-Jewish historian Josephus in the first century CE. He writes about Helena, queen of Adiabene, a small kingdom from Mesopotamia (today part of northern Iraq) who came to Jerusalem at the end of the Second Temple Period. Her family converted to Judaism and built a palace in the area today known as the City of David. Helena's son Monobaz II had her remains and those of his brother buried "three stadia from Jerusalem." Medieval Europeans mistakenly identified the tomb as belonging to the kings of Judah.

=== Discovery and exploration ===
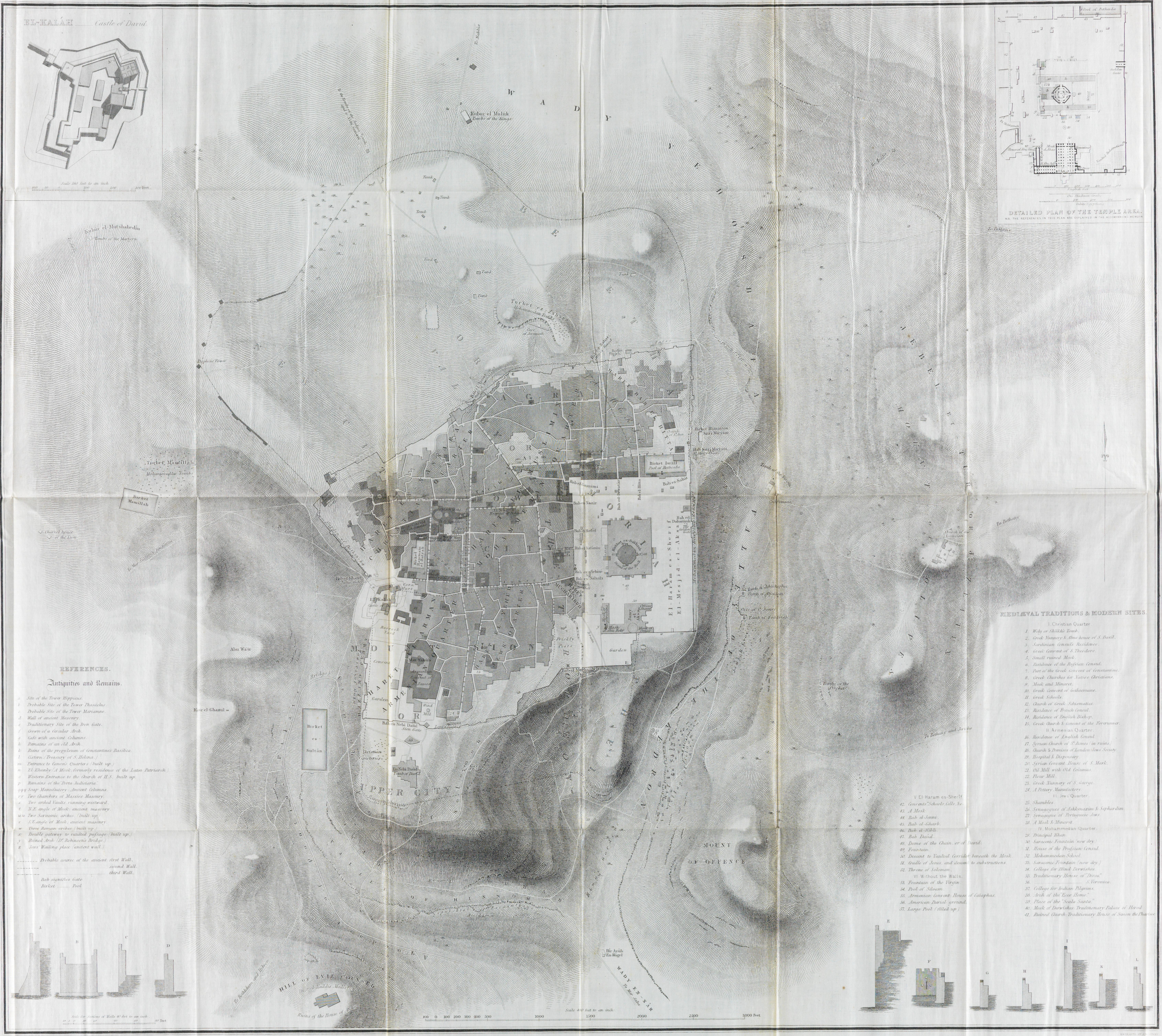
"Tombs of the Kings" (top center) shown in the 1841 Aldrich and Symonds map of Jerusalem

In 1847, the Turkish governor ordered a search for treasures in the tomb but none were found. In 1863, the French archaeologist Félicien de Saulcy was given permission to excavate the tomb. The German architect Conrad Schick drew up a map of the site. De Saulcy found sarcophagi, one of which was bearing the Hebrew inscription "Queen Tzaddah". He believed this was the sarcophagus of the wife of Zedekiah, the last king of Judah.

After human bones were found, the Jewish community appealed to Sir Moses Montefiore to persuade the Ottomans to halt the excavations. De Saulcy smuggled out some of his findings, which are now at the Louvre in Paris.

=== Purchase and property ===
In 1864, the French-Jewish banker Isaac Péreire attempted to purchase the site but without success. In 1874, a French-Jewish woman, Berthe Amalie Bertrand, announced her purchase of the plot of ground. After she had paid 30,000 francs for the property, it was then registered as French property under the trusteeship of the French consul. Bertrand declared: "I am of the firm opinion that this property, the field and the burial cave of the kings, will become the land in perpetuity of the Jewish community, to be preserved from desecration and abomination, and will never again be damaged by foreigners. She had a wall and guard post built around the site. In 1886, Bertrand's heirs donated it to the French government "to preserve it for science and the worship of the faithful children of Israel". It's a part of the French national domain in the Holy Land.

== Traditions ==
The Tomb of the Kings was described by the Greek geographer Pausanias as the second most beautiful tomb in the world (after the tomb of Mausolus, one of the Seven Wonders of the Ancient World) who visited in Jerusalem. He declares that he "knows many wonderful tombs" and mentions two of them, one of which is in Halicarnassus and the other "in [the Land of] the Hebrews" (Greek: ἐν τῇ Ἑβραίων) and has a sophisticated opening mechanism aimed at a certain day of the year and for a certain time: "The Hebrews have a tomb, that of Helena, a local woman, in the city of Jerusalem (Greek:πόλει Σολύμοις), which the Roman emperor razed to the ground. There is a contrivance in the tomb whereby the door, which like the entire tomb is made of stone, does not open until the year brings back the same day and the same hour. Then the mechanism, unaided, opens the door, which, after a short interval, closes itself again. It happens at the same time, but if you try at any other time to open the door, you will not be able to do so; Power will not open it, but will only break it."

A small stone house was built on top of the tomb by Irhimeh clan (Arabic: ارحيمه), a Jerusalemite family.

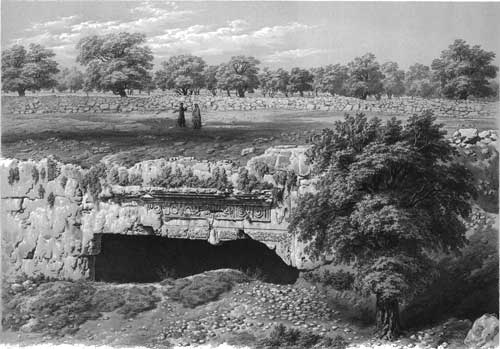
Photo of Tombs of the Kings in Jerusalem, by Ermete Pierotti

Josephus distinguishes between the monuments of Queen Helena (located "three stadia outside the walls of Jerusalem") and the Tombs of the Kings, being situated a little further distance away from the monuments. For this reason, Italian architect and engineer, Ermete Pierotti, thought that St. Stephen's Basiica marked the site of the tomb of Queen Helena, particularly after he discovered there a pyramidal rock formation and what resembled sepulchres.

== Archaeological findings ==
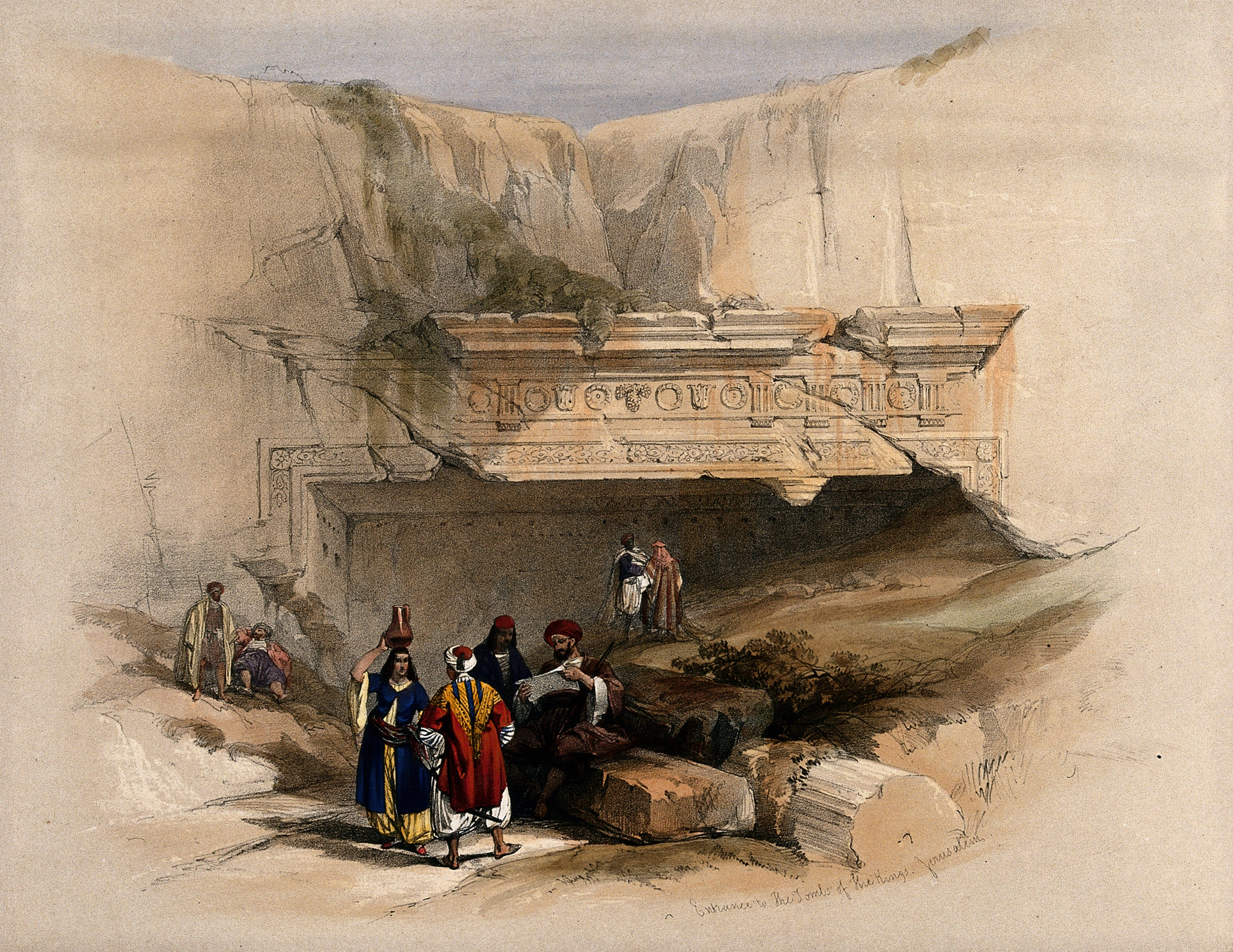
Tombs of the Kings, 1842

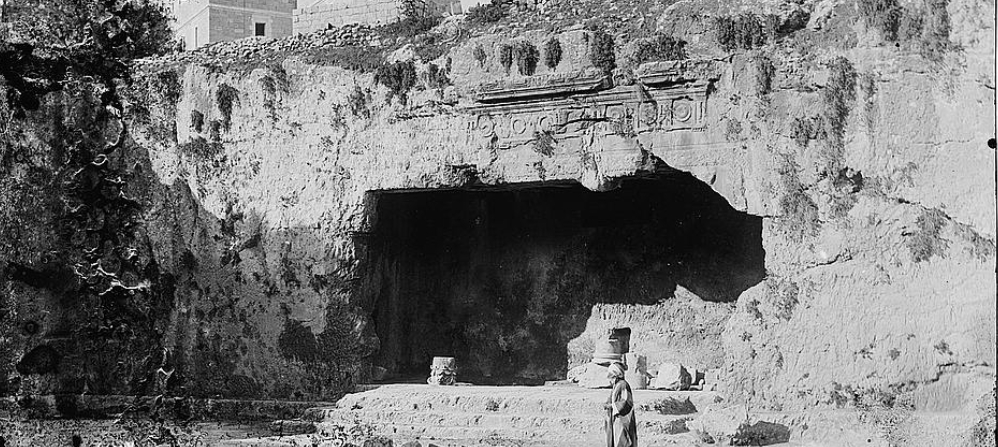
Tombs of the Kings in Jerusalem (click to enlarge)

From the house there is a 9 meter wide staircase (23 steps) that was originally paved and leads to a forecourt. The rain water is collected in baths, which are carved in the steps, and carried via a channel system to the water wells. At the bottom of the stairs there are ancient ritual baths (mikva’ot) as well as a stone wall to the left with a gate. This gate leads to a courtyard that was cut from the rock at the same date. The dimensions of this courtyard are roughly 27 meters long from north to south and 25 meters wide from west to east.

The entrance to the tombs is via this courtyard. The tombs are entered via a rock-cut arch (facade) in the western side. The 28-meter façade was originally crowned with three pyramids, which no longer exist, and decorated with reliefs of grapes, plexus leaves, acorns and fruit, reflecting the Greek architectural style. The architrave was originally supported by two pillars, fragments of which were found in the excavations.

The tombs are arranged on two levels around a central chamber, with four rooms upstairs and three rooms downstairs. The central chamber itself is entered from the courtyard via an antechamber that goes down into a dimly lit maze of chambers. The access from the antechamber to the exterior courtyard could be sealed closed by rolling a round stone across it, and the stone still remains in-situ. In the first century CE, a "secret mechanism" operated by water pressure moved the stone. Probably a small amount of water pressure activated a system of weights to open the tomb. Two of the eight burial chambers have arcosolia, resting places made of a bench with an arch over it. Some of the arcosolia have triangular niches where oil lamps were placed to give light during the burial process.

The two most common types of tombs in the first century CE are found in this tomb complex. Shaft tombs were long narrow shafts in which the deceased were placed and closed with a stone slab which probably had the name of the occupant inscribed on it. Channels in the center of the shafts were probably carved to drain the water that seeped through the rock.

The tombs are now empty, but previously housed a number of sarcophagi; they were excavated by a French archaeological mission headed by Louis Felicien de Saulcy, who took them back to France. They are exhibited at the Louvre.

Although no kings are known to have been buried here, one of the sarcophagi bears two Aramaic inscriptions and is thought to be that of Queen Helena of Adiabene; the one inscription which reads, Ṣaddan Malkata (Palmyrene: צדן מלכתא), and the other, Ṣaddah Malkatah (Aramaic: צדה מלכתה), interpreted by scholars to mean: "Our mistress, the Queen." The sarcophagus is now at the Louvre Museum in Paris. The decorative architecture of the tomb complex is Seleucid, which would fit with this identification.

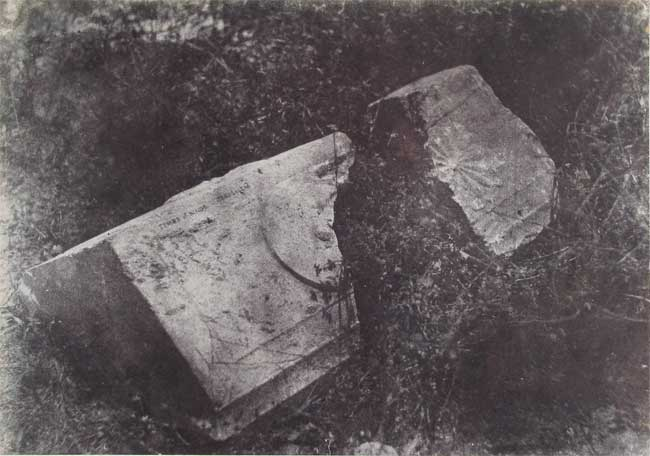
Sarcophagus of Helena of Adiabene

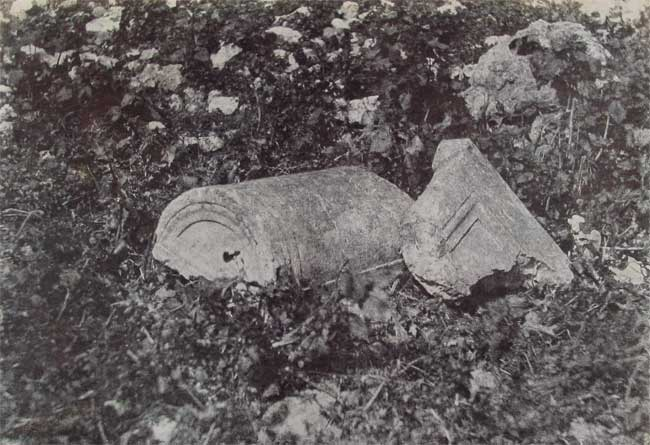
Sarcophagus from the Tombs of the Kings

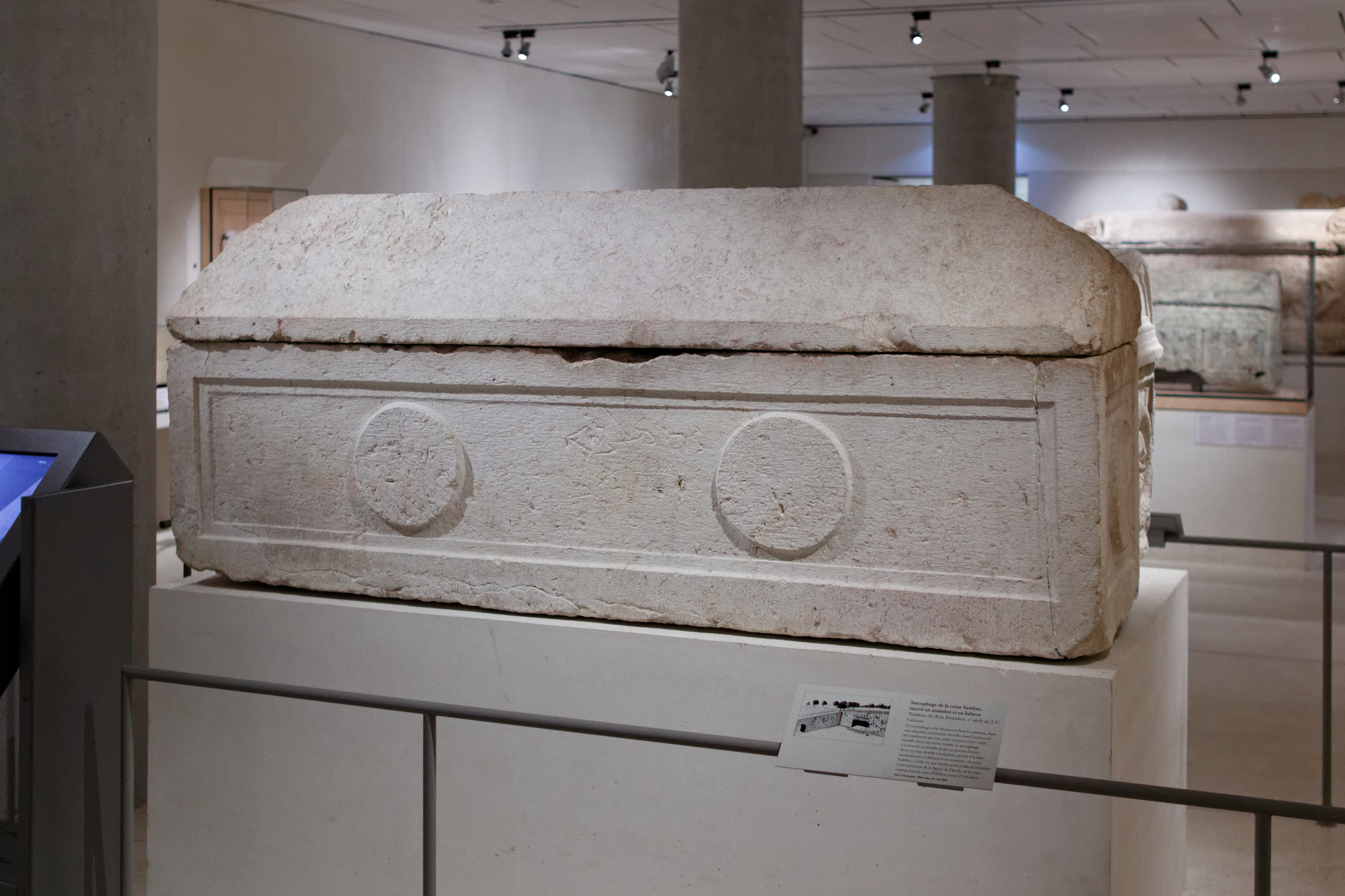
The Sarcophagus in the Louvre

== See also ==
- Rock-cut tombs in ancient Israel
- Mokata 'Abud
- Khirbet Kurkush
- Deir ed-Darb
- Jason's Tomb
- Tomb of Absalom
- Tomb of Benei Hezir
