= Ananias of Adiabene =

Jewish merchant (15 BCE-30 CE)

Ananias of Adiabene (/ˌænəˈnaɪəs/; c. 15 BCE – c. 30 CE) was a Jewish merchant and mendicant proselytizer, probably of Hellenistic origin, who, in the opening years of the Christian common era, was prominent at the court of Abinergaos I (Abennerig), king of Characene. He was instrumental in the conversion to Judaism of numerous native and foreign inhabitants of Charax Spasinu. This city, the capital of Characene, was situated at the confluence of the two arms of the Tigris near the Persian Gulf and was at the time a great mercantile center.

Amongst Ananias' most prominent converts were several women of high position at the court, particularly the princess Symacho, the king's daughter. This princess married Izates bar Monobaz, a young prince who had been sent to Abennerig's court by his parents, Monobaz I and Helena, the rulers of Adiabene. Through his wife, Izates' attention was directed to Ananias, with whom he formed an acquaintance that eventually ripened into a strong attachment. Around the year 18 CE, Ananias won the prince over to the Jewish faith. Moreover, Izates was named as successor to the throne by Monobaz, who, in so doing, passed over his elder sons. Upon his accession (about 22), Izates, in order to show his genuine attachment to the new religion, declared his determination to undergo the rite of circumcision. Helena opposed this, fearing that the adoption of foreign ceremonies might arouse against the young king the indignation of his pagan subjects. Ananias, who had come to Adiabene with Izates, supported Helena's contention, arguing that such a step on the part of the king would endanger the life of his Jewish instructor, and, further, that circumcision was not vital to the fulfilment of the Jewish religion and the worship of God.

Izates seemed convinced by the latter argument, until there came to his court another Jew, Eleazar, who, in contradistinction to Ananias' Hellenic leniency, was a rigorous legalist from Galilee. He persuaded Izates to undergo the rite. Ananias and Helena were strongly agitated when Izates disclosed his action, but the trouble they predicted did not immediately ensue. Whether Ananias made further converts in Izates' country is not stated.

In his book, "James the Brother of Jesus," Robert Eisenman contends that this person is the same as the Biblical Ananias from the book of Acts.
