= Symacho =

Daughter of King Abinergaos I of Characene

Symacho (also called Samacho) (fl. early 1st century CE) was the daughter of King Abinergaos I of Characene. She was converted to Judaism by Ananias of Adiabene. Symacho married Izates bar Monobaz during the latter's sojourn in Charax as a youth. She presumably went with him when he left to take up his throne in Adiabene.
