= Louis Félicien de Saulcy =

French numismatist, Orientalist and archaeologist

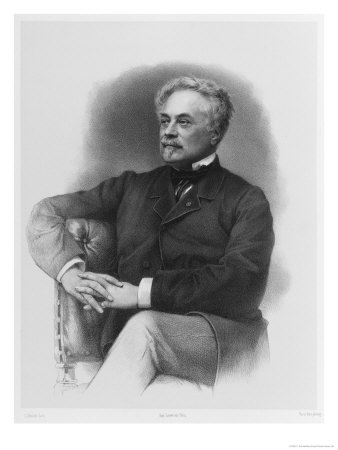
Louis Félicien Joseph Caignart de Saulcy

Louis Félicien Joseph Caignart de Saulcy (19 March 1807 – 4 November 1880), better known as simply Félicien or Félix de Saulcy, was a French numismatist, Orientalist, and archaeologist.

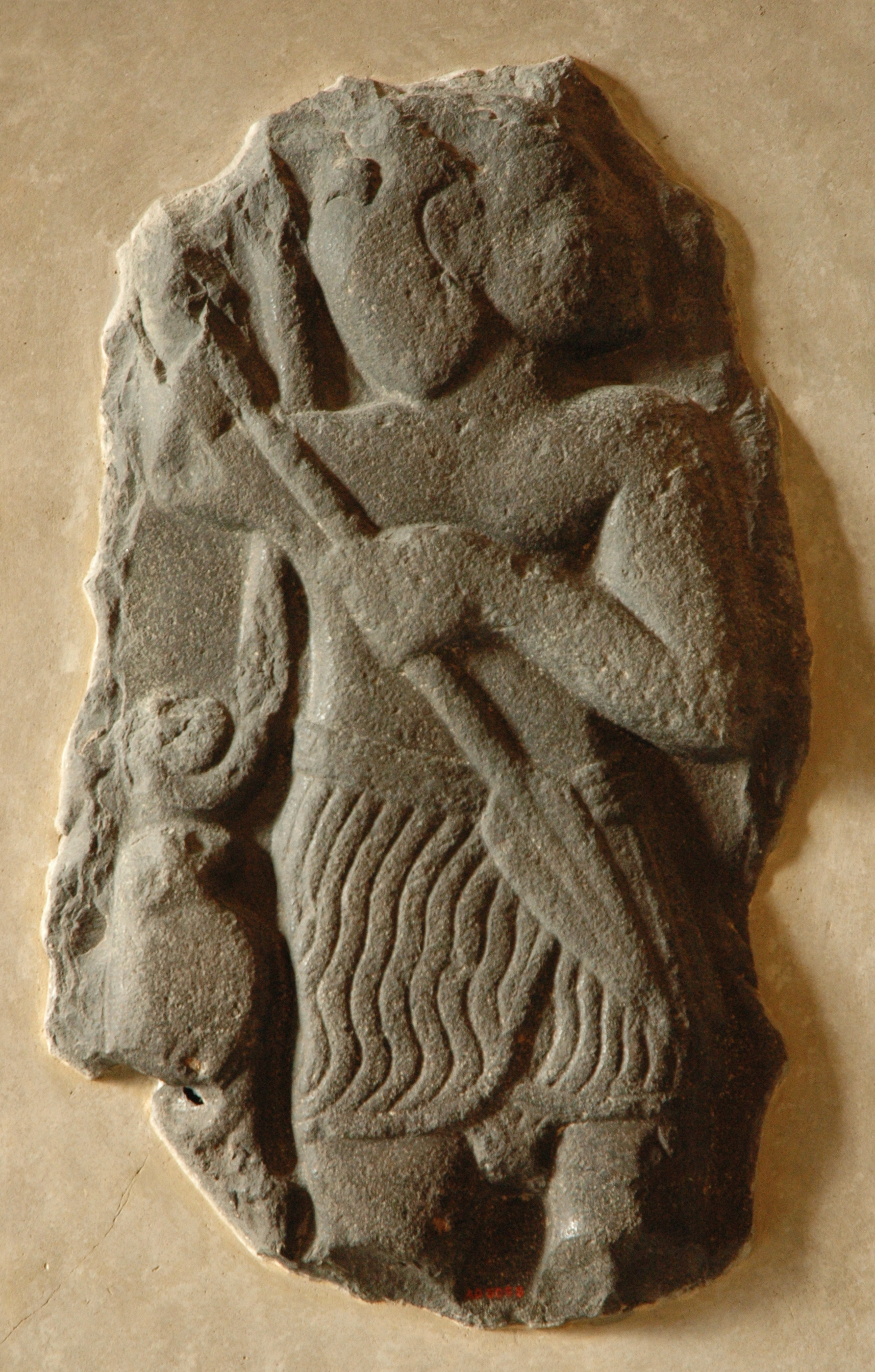
Shihan stele, in the Louvre

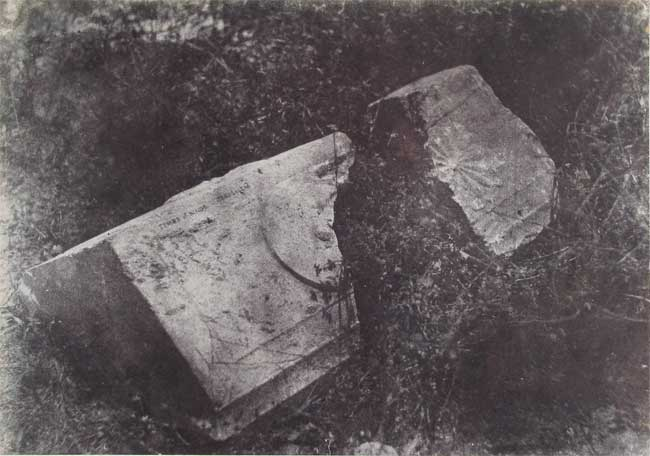
Sarcophagus of Helena of Adiabene

== Early life ==
Louis Felicien de Saulcy was born in Lille, France, the scion of a noble family.

== Career ==
In 1843, De Saulcy deciphered the Libyco-Berber script almost fully, thanks to the Punic-Libyan Inscription. He travelled though Syria and Palestine in 1850–51, 1863, and 1869. On his first trip to Palestine in 1850, searching for something of interest "in a place fraught with danger", he toured the Dead Sea area, misidentified Sodom and Gomorrah, and sketched the first map of Masada. He discovered the Shihan Stele east of the Dead Sea (see German Wiki article here) and identified Tell es-Sultan as the site of the ancient city of Jericho.

De Saucy conducted an early archaeological dig in the Holy Land in 1863. He excavated the Tombs of the Kings in Jerusalem, mistakenly identifying them as the tombs of the House of David. He discovered the sarcophagus of Queen Helena of Adiabene, although he believed the bones inside, wrapped in shrouds with golden embroidery, were the remains of the wife of a king of Judea from the First Temple period, possibly Zedekiah or Jehoash. De Saulcy was forced to suspend the dig when the news that human bones were being dug up drew the ire of the Jewish community of Jerusalem. The sarcophagus and other findings were sent to France and displayed at the Louvre.

== Numismatics ==
De Saulcy's archaeological work is now considered amateurish, but he is recognized as an important numismatist. He was the first to catalogue the coins of Palestine and amassed a large coin collection.

== Philately ==
De Saulcy was also a stamp collector. He sold his collection to Frederick Adolphus Philbrick.

== Published works ==
- Numismatique des Croisades (1847);
- Recherches sur la numismatique judaïque (1854);
- "Numismatique de la Terre Sainte" (1874);
- Voyage autour de la Mer Morte (2 vols., 1853);
- Voyage en Terre Sainte (2 vols., 1865; including his account of the excavation of the Tombs of the Kings in vol. 1,345–410; vol. 2, 188–9, 309–11);
- Saulcy, Louis Félicien de (1854). Narrative of a journey round the Dead Sea, and in the Bible lands, in 1850 and 1851. Vol. 1, new edition. London: R. Bentley.
- Saulcy, Louis Félicien de (1854). Narrative of a journey round the Dead Sea, and in the Bible lands, in 1850 and 1851. Vol. 2, new edition. London: R. Bentley.
- Saulcy, Louis Félicien de (1853). Narrative of a journey round the Dead Sea, and in the Bible lands, in 1850 and 1851. Vol. 2. London: R. Bentley.
- Saulcy, Louis Félicien de (1854). Narrative of a journey round the Dead Sea, and in the Bible lands, in 1850 and 1851. Vol. 2, 2nd edition. London: R. Bentley.
- Saulcy, Louis Félicien de (1854). Narrative of a journey round the Dead Sea, and in the Bible lands, in 1850 and 1851. Vol. 2, 2nd edition. London: R. Bentley.
- (1872): Voyage en terre sainte Vol 1.
- (1872): Voyage en terre sainte Vol 2.
- Carnets de voyage en Orient, ed. by F. Bassan (1955)

== See also ==
- Archaeology of Israel
- Syro-Palestinian archaeology

== Bibliography ==
- Rosenberg, Stephen, "Felicien de Saulcy and the Rediscovery of Tyros in Jordan," Palestine Exploration Quarterly, 138,1 (2006), 35–41.
