= Izates II =

King of the Parthian client kingdom of Adiabene (c.1 CE–54 CE)

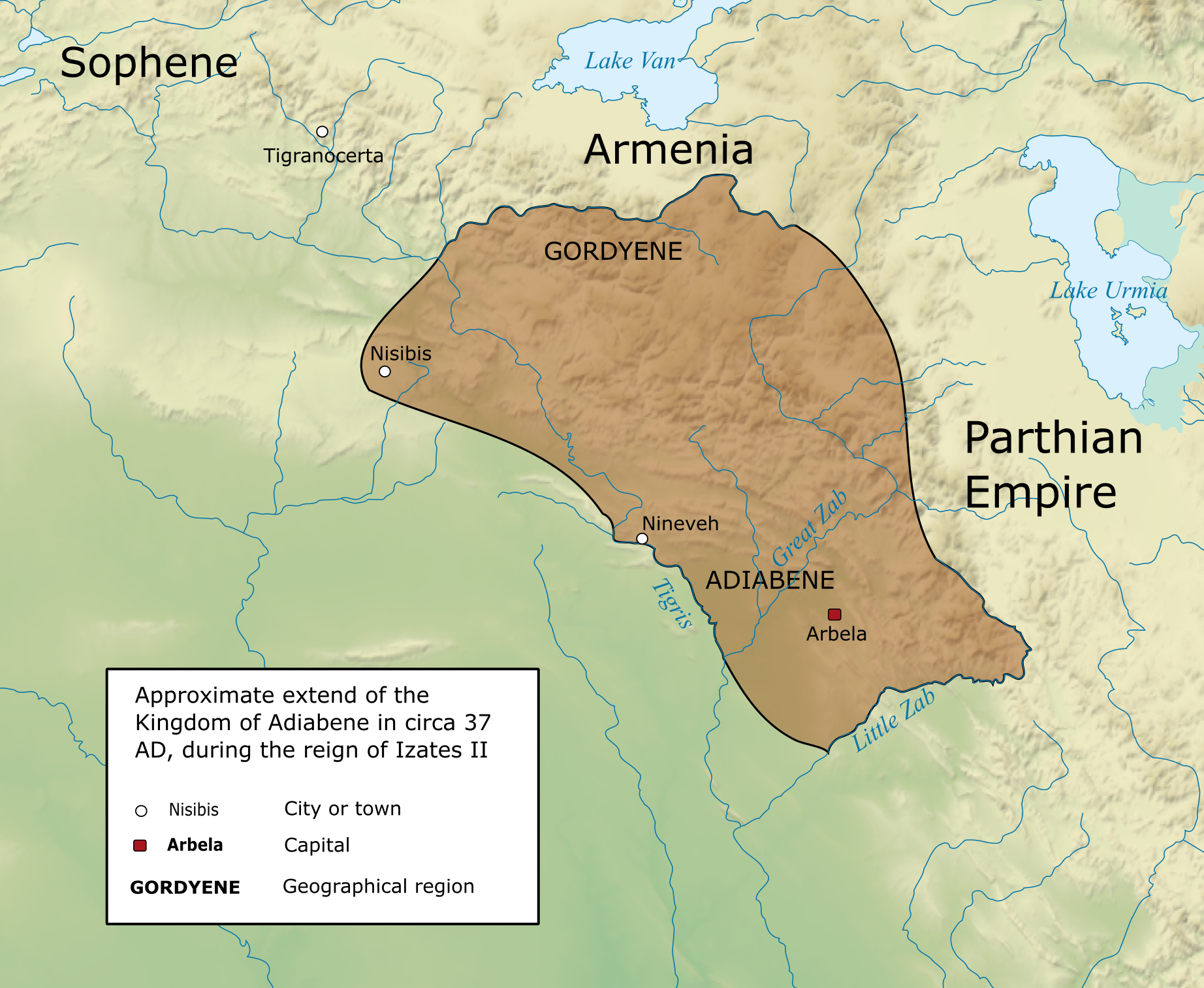
Map of the Kingdom of Adiabene in ca 37 CE, during the reign of Izates II

Izates bar Monobaz (Greek: Ἰζάτης, Hebrew: זוטוס בן מונבז; c. 1 – 54) was king of the Parthian client kingdom of Adiabene from approximately 30 to 54. He is notable for converting to Judaism. He was the son of Queen Helena of Adiabene and Monobaz I of Adiabene. Queen Helena was also said to be the wife of King Abgarus of Edessa and thus the queen of Edessa too.

During his youth Izina was sent by his father to the court of King Abinergaos I of Characene in Charax Spasinu. While in Charax Izina became acquainted with a Jewish merchant named Ananias, who familiarized him with the tenets of the Jewish religion, in which he became deeply interested. Izates married King Abinergaos' daughter Symacho who had been converted to Judaism through the efforts of Ananias. His mother had been previously won over to Judaism without his knowledge. On returning home and ascending the throne on the death of his father (c. 31 CE), Izina discovered the conversion of his mother; and he himself intended to adopt Judaism, and even to submit to circumcision. He was, however, dissuaded from this step both by his teacher Ananias and by his mother, but was ultimately persuaded thereto by another Jew, Eleazar.

Genesis Rabbah relates the story of his circumcision differently. According to this Midrash, Munbaz and his brother Zawatus (i.e. Monobaz and Izates) were sitting and reading the book of Genesis. When they came to the verse, "and circumcise the flesh of your foreskin", Munbaz turned his face to the wall and began to cry, Zawatus also turned his face to the wall and also began to cry. Later each of the two independently and without the knowledge of the other went to have himself circumcised.

For some time Izina enjoyed peace; and he was so highly respected that he was chosen as arbitrator between the Parthian king Artabanus II and his rebellious nobles (c. 39 CE). But when several of Izina' relatives openly acknowledged their conversion to Judaism, some of the nobles of Adiabene secretly induced Abia, an Arab king, to declare war against him. Izates defeated his enemy, who in despair committed suicide. The nobles then conspired with Vologases, King of Parthia, but the latter was at the last moment prevented from carrying out his plans, and Izina continued to reign undisturbed for a total of twenty-four years.

Izina died around 54 CE. His mother Helena survived him for only a short time. He left twenty-four sons and twenty-four daughters. Izates was succeeded by his older brother Monobaz II, who sent Izina' remains and those of Queen Helena to Jerusalem for burial.

== Sources ==
- Gottheil, Richard and Isaac Broydé. "Izates". Jewish Encyclopedia. Funk and Wagnalls, 1901–1906.
- Hansman, J. F. (1986). "Arbela". Encyclopaedia Iranica, Vol. II, Fasc. 3. pp. 277–278.
- Marciak, Michał (2017). Sophene, Gordyene, and Adiabene: Three Regna Minora of Northern Mesopotamia Between East and West. BRILL. ISBN 9789004350724.
