= Monobaz I =

1st-century AD king of Adiabene

Monobaz I (also known as Bazeus or Monobazus; Hebrew: מֻנְבָּז Munəbāz) was king of the Parthian client state of Adiabene in the 20s and 30s of the 1st century AD. He was the husband (and brother) of Queen Helena of Adiabene. With Helena he fathered Izates bar Monobaz and Monobaz II. Midrash Genesis Rabbah 46:10 conflates the identity of Monobaz I with King Ptolemy, “‘And circumcise the flesh of your foreskin’ (Gen 17:1): [The foreskin] hangs on the body like a sore (nomi). It happened that king Munbaz and Zawatus (=Izates), the sons of King Ptolemy, were sitting and reading the book of Genesis. When they came to this verse, ‘and circumcise the flesh of your foreskin,’ one turned his face to the wall and began to cry, and the other turned his face to the wall and [also] began to cry.[21] Then each of them went and had himself circumcised [without the other knowing].”

Monobaz II, the son of Monobaz I, is quoted in the Talmud in an account wherein he was being criticized for not amassing as much wealth as his forefathers had. His response was this: "My fathers stored up below and I am storing up above... My fathers stored in a place which can be tampered with, but I have stored in a place which cannot be tampered with… My fathers gathered treasures of money and I have gathered treasures of souls."(b. Baba Batra 11a).
