= Helena of Adiabene =

1st century queen of Adiabene

- Queen of Adiabene and Edessa
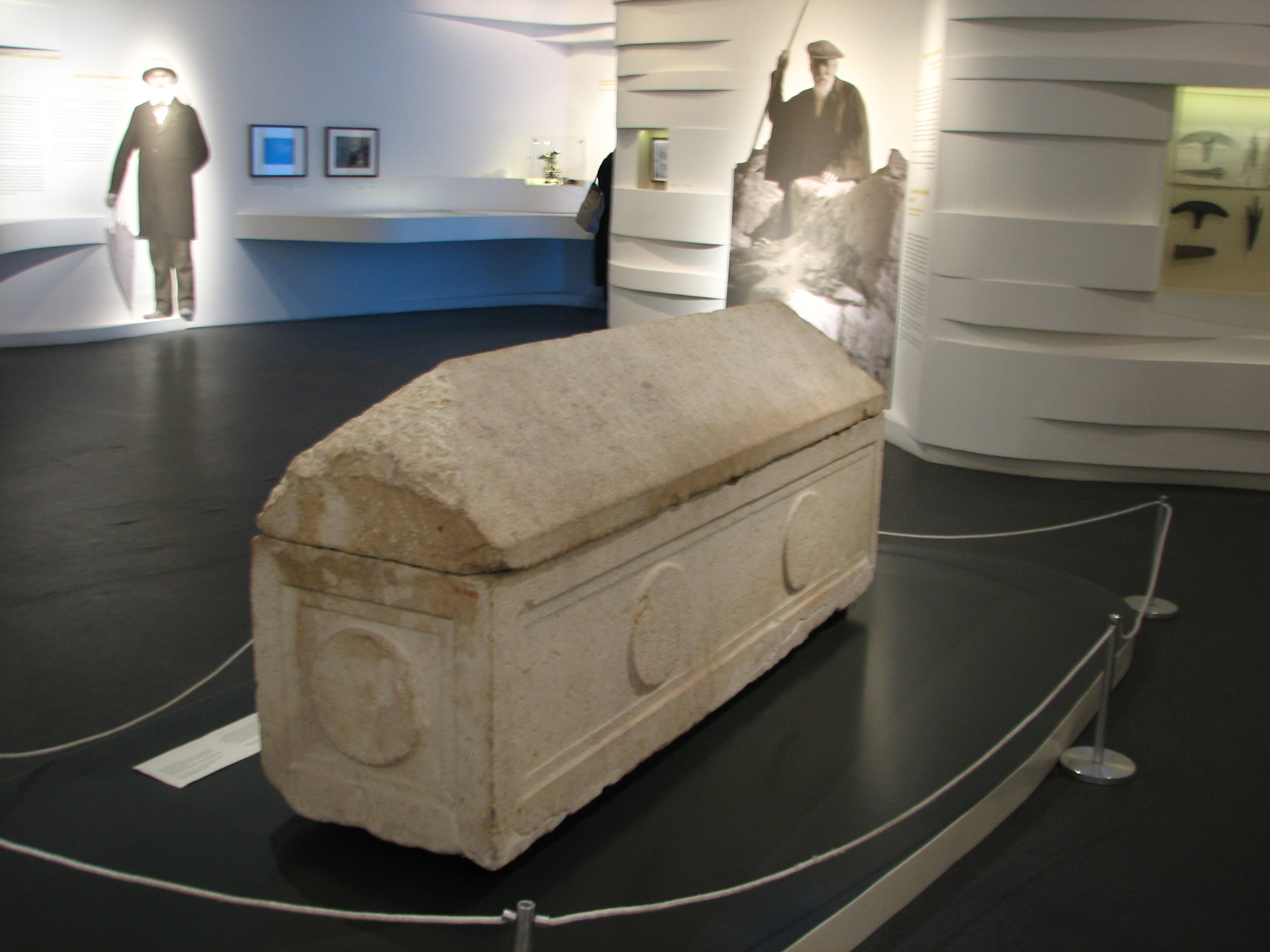
- Sarcophagus of Helena, Israel Museum
- Died: 50–56 CE
- Burial: Jerusalem
- Spouses: Monobaz I and Abgar V
- Issue: Izates II and Monobaz II
- Religion: Judaism

Helena of Adiabene (Ancient Greek: Ἑλένη, romanized: Helénē, Hebrew: הִילְנִי, romanized: Hīlənī; died c. 50–56 CE) was a queen mother of Adiabene, a vassal state of the Parthian Empire. With her husband, and probably also brother, Monobaz I, she was the mother of Izates II and Monobaz II. Helena became a convert to Judaism about the year 30 CE. According to Josephus, Helena was the daughter of King Izates. Moses of Chorene makes her the chief wife of Abgar V, king of Edessa.

== Sources of information ==
What is known of Helena is based on the writings of Josephus, Movses Khorenatsi, Kirakos Gandzaketsi, and the Talmud. Josephus, although younger, was almost contemporary with Helena, living in Jerusalem at the time when she lived and was buried there, and he wrote substantial parts of his work from first-hand knowledge. The earliest parts of the Talmud, while based on older sources, were compiled and redacted from around 200 onward.

== Biography ==
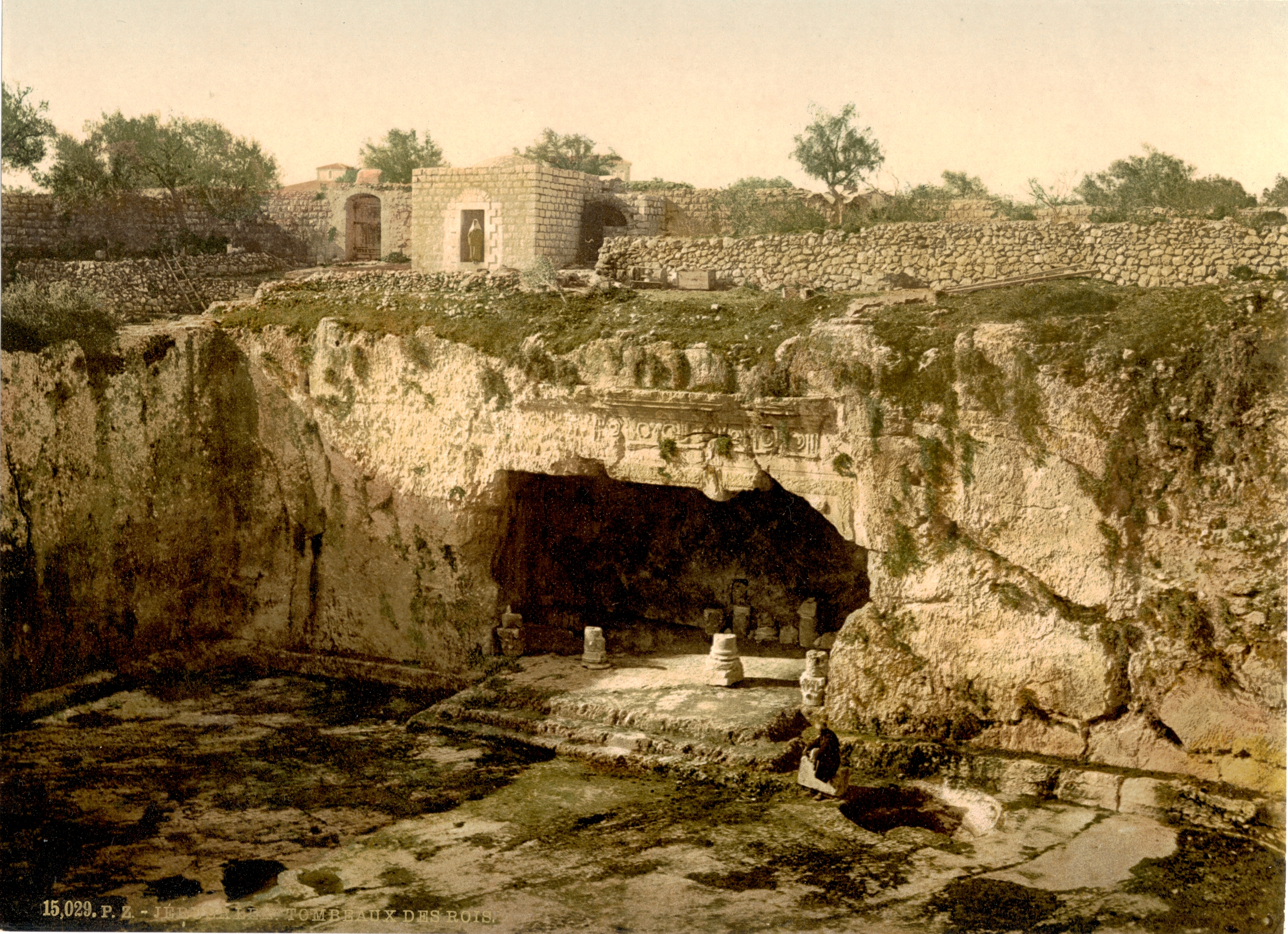
Tombs of the Kings

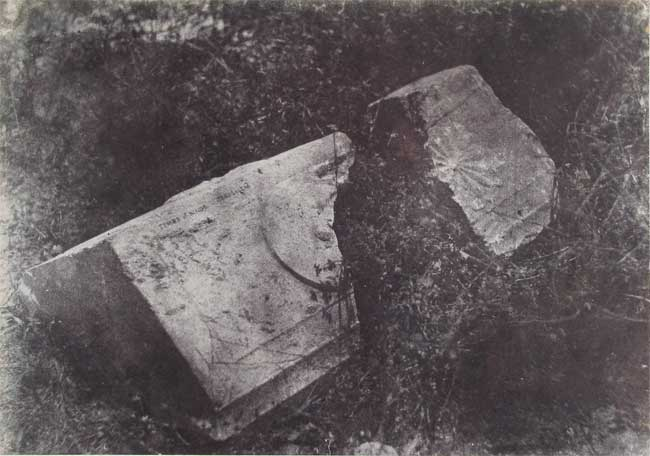
Sarcophagus of Helena of Adiabene

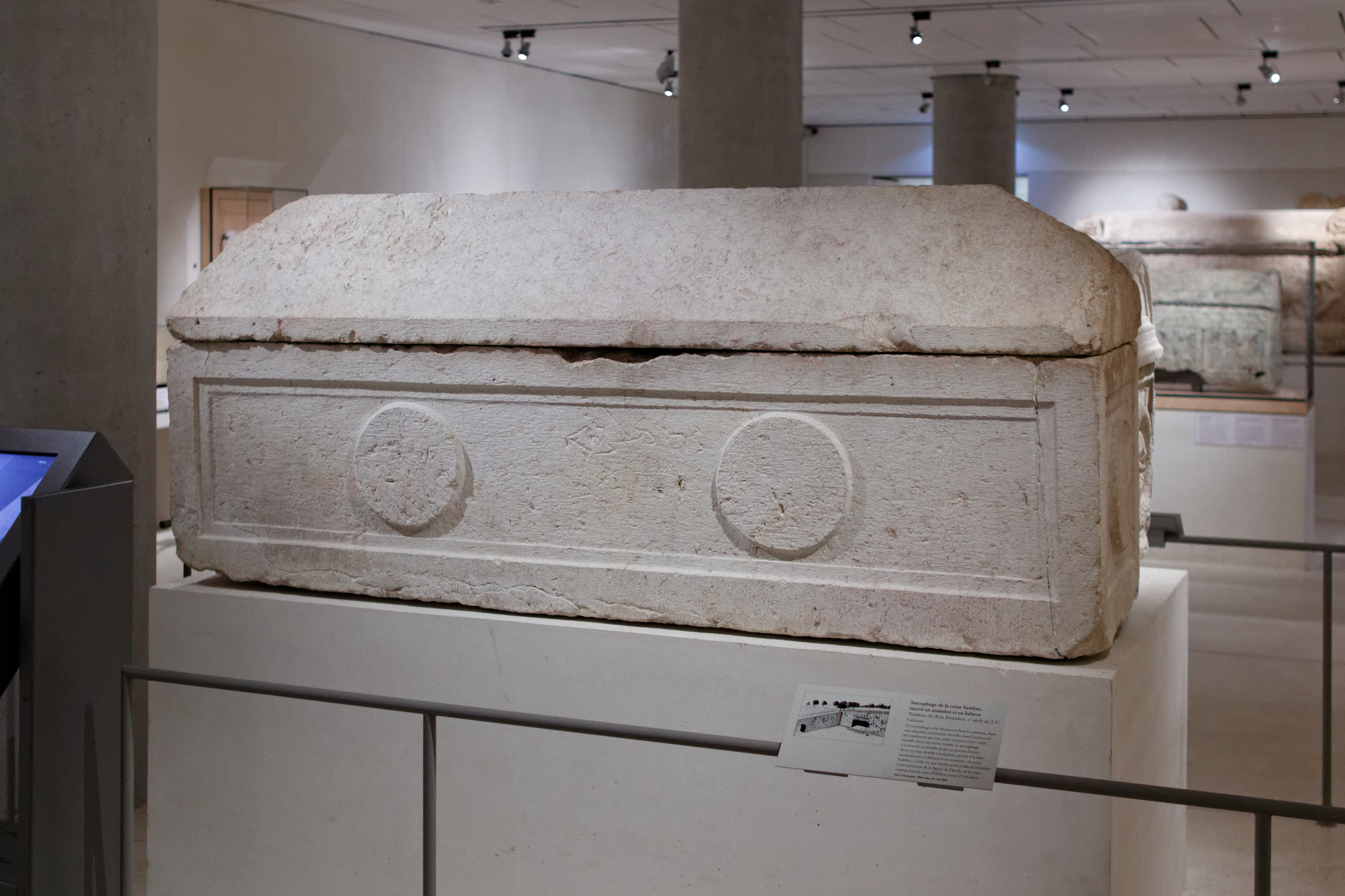
The Sarcophagus in the Louvre

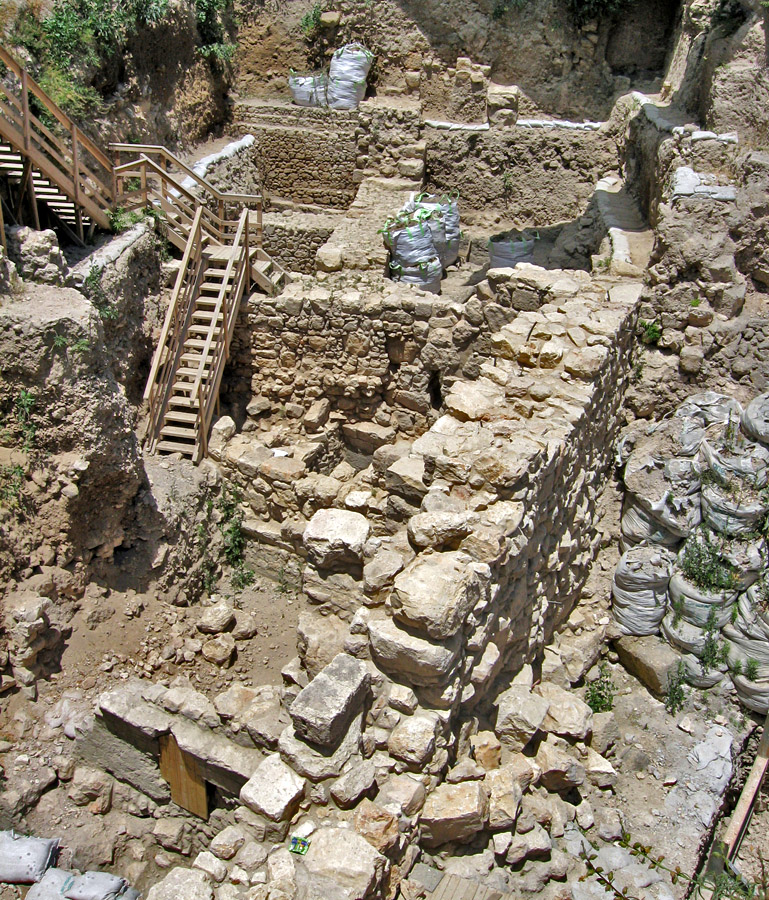
Queen Helena palace

Helena of Adiabene was noted for her generosity; during a famine at Jerusalem in 45–46 CE, she sent to Alexandria for grain and to Cyprus for dried figs for distribution among the sufferers from the famine. In the Talmud, in Bava Batra 11a, this is laid to the credit of Monobaz II instead. Although Nehemiah Brüll regarded the reference to Monobaz as indicating the dynasty, Rashi maintained the simpler explanation—that Monobaz himself is meant. The Talmud speaks also of important presents which the queen gave to the Temple in Jerusalem. "Helena had a golden candlestick made over the door of the Temple," to which statement is added that when the sun rose its rays were reflected from the candlestick and everybody knew that it was the time for reading the Shema. She also made a golden plate on which was written the passage of the Torah which the kohanim read when a wife suspected of infidelity was brought before him. In the Jerusalem Talmud, tractate Yoma iii. 8, the candlestick and the plate are confused.

The strictness with which she observed the customs is instanced in the Talmud:

Her son [Izates] having gone to war, Helena made a vow that if he should return safe, she would become a Nazirite for the space of seven years. She fulfilled her vow, and at the end of seven years went to Judea. Those belonging to the School of Hillel told her that she must observe her vow anew, and she therefore lived as a Nazirite for seven more years. At the end of the second seven years she became ritually impure by corpse uncleanness, and she had to repeat her Naziriteship, thus being a Nazarite for twenty-one years. Judah bar Ilai, however, said she was a Nazirite for fourteen years only.

"Rabbi Judah said: 'The sukkah [erected for the Feast of Tabernacles] of Queen Helena in Lydda was higher than twenty cubits. The rabbis used to go in and out and make no remark about it'."

Helena moved to Jerusalem, where she is buried in the pyramidal tomb which she had constructed during her lifetime, three stadia north of Jerusalem. The catacombs are known as "Tombs of the Kings." A sarcophagus bearing two inscriptions was found there, the funerary epigram reading in Aramaic Ṣaddān Malkaṯā (Palmyrene: 𐡲𐡣𐡭 𐡬𐡫𐡪𐡶𐡠), and Ṣaddā Malkaṯā (צדה מלכתה), interpreted by scholars to mean: "Our mistress, the Queen."

The sarcophagus of Helena was discovered by Louis Félicien de Saulcy in the nineteenth century. However, he believed the bones inside, wrapped in shrouds with golden embroidery, were the remains of the wife of a king of Judea from the First Temple period, possibly Zedekiah or Jehoash. De Saulcy was forced to suspend the dig when the news that human bones were being dug up drew the ire of the Jewish community of Jerusalem. The sarcophagus and other findings were sent to France and displayed at the Louvre.

== Jerusalem palace ==
According to Josephus, the palace was built by (the otherwise unknown) "Grapte, a kinswoman" of Izates. The palace of Queen Helena is believed to have been discovered by archaeologist Doron Ben-Ami during excavations in the former Givati parking lot area adjacent to the City of David in 2007. It was a monumental building located in the City of David just south of the Temple Mount and was destroyed by the Romans in 70 CE. The ruins contained datable coins, stone vessels and pottery as well as remnants of ancient frescoes. The basement level contained a mikveh (ritual bath).
