= Abia (name) =

Abia is both a surname and a given name. It is most prominent in Africa but also has roots in hebrew and arab culture. Notable people with the name include:

- Koutoua Abia (born 1965), Ivorian sprint canoeist
- Abia Brown (1743–1785), a Deputy to the Provincial Congress of New Jersey
- Abia Nale (born 1986), a South African football midfielder

== See also ==
- Alternate spelling of Abijah, a Biblical name
