= Abia (mythology) =

In Greek mythology, the nursemaid of Hyllus

In Greek mythology, Abia (Ancient Greek: Ἀβία) served as the nursemaid of Hyllus, the son of Heracles and Deianira. In some translations, the child she nursed is referred to as Glenus. After the unsuccessful attempt of Heracles' son Hyllus to return to the Peloponnesus, Abia settled there.

== Mythology ==
Abia was honored by the Heraclid Cresphontes for constructing a temple dedicated to Heracles in Ira. As a result, the town of Ira was renamed Abia in her honor. Abia was one of the seven cities promised by Agamemnon to Achilles in an effort to persuade him to rejoin the Trojan War. Eventually, Abia became a part of the Achaean League.

In Pausanias' Description of Greece the origin of the city's name and the stories surrounding it is explained: as follows

"There is in our time a city Abia in Messenia on the coast, some twenty stades distant from the Choerius valley. They say that this was formerly called Ire and was one of the seven cities which Homer says that Agamemnon promised to Achilles. When Hyllus and the Dorians were defeated by the Achaeans, it is said that Abia, nurse of Glenus the son of Heracles, withdrew to Ire, and settling there built a temple to Heracles, and that afterwards for this reason Cresphontes, amongst other honors assigned to her, renamed the city after Abia. There was a notable temple of Heracles here, and also of Asclepius."
