= Monobaz II =

1st century king of Adiabene

Monobazus II was the son of Queen Helena of Adiabene and King Monobaz I, his younger brother was Izates bar Monobazus. He is known as Monobaz or Munbaz in the Babylonian Talmud.

Like his brother and his mother, Monobazus became a convert to Judaism. He ruled as king of Adiabene after the death of his brother Izates around 54 CE. He was deposed in 61 CE by King Tigranes VI of Armenia for his support of Parthia. The date of his death is unknown but tradition claims him to have been alive and back on the throne during the First Jewish-Roman War, when he gave aid to the Jewish rebels against the Roman Empire. Two 'kinsmen' of Monobazus, Monobazus and Kenedaeus, fought on the side of the Jews in the battle against Cestius. The 'sons and brothers of Izates the king' were taken hostage to Rome after the war.

The Talmud relates that Monobazus: "dissipated all his own hoards and the hoards of his fathers in years of scarcity. His brothers and his father's household came in a delegation to him and said, 'Your father saved money and added to the treasures of his fathers, and you are squandering them.' He replied, 'My fathers stored up below and I am storing up above... My fathers stored in a place which can be tampered with, but I have stored in a place which cannot be tampered with … My fathers gathered treasures of money and I have gathered treasures of souls...' " King Monobaz also donated handsome gifts to the Temple in Jerusalem. "King Monobaz had all the handles of all the vessels used on Yom Kippur made of gold … He also made of gold the base of the vessels, the rims of the vessels, the handles of the vessels, and the handles of the knives..."

Queen Helena of Adiabene was also said to be the wife of King Abgarus of Edessa and thus she was also the queen of Edessa.
