= Nomoli figurine =

Carved stone figurine S/L

Nomoli
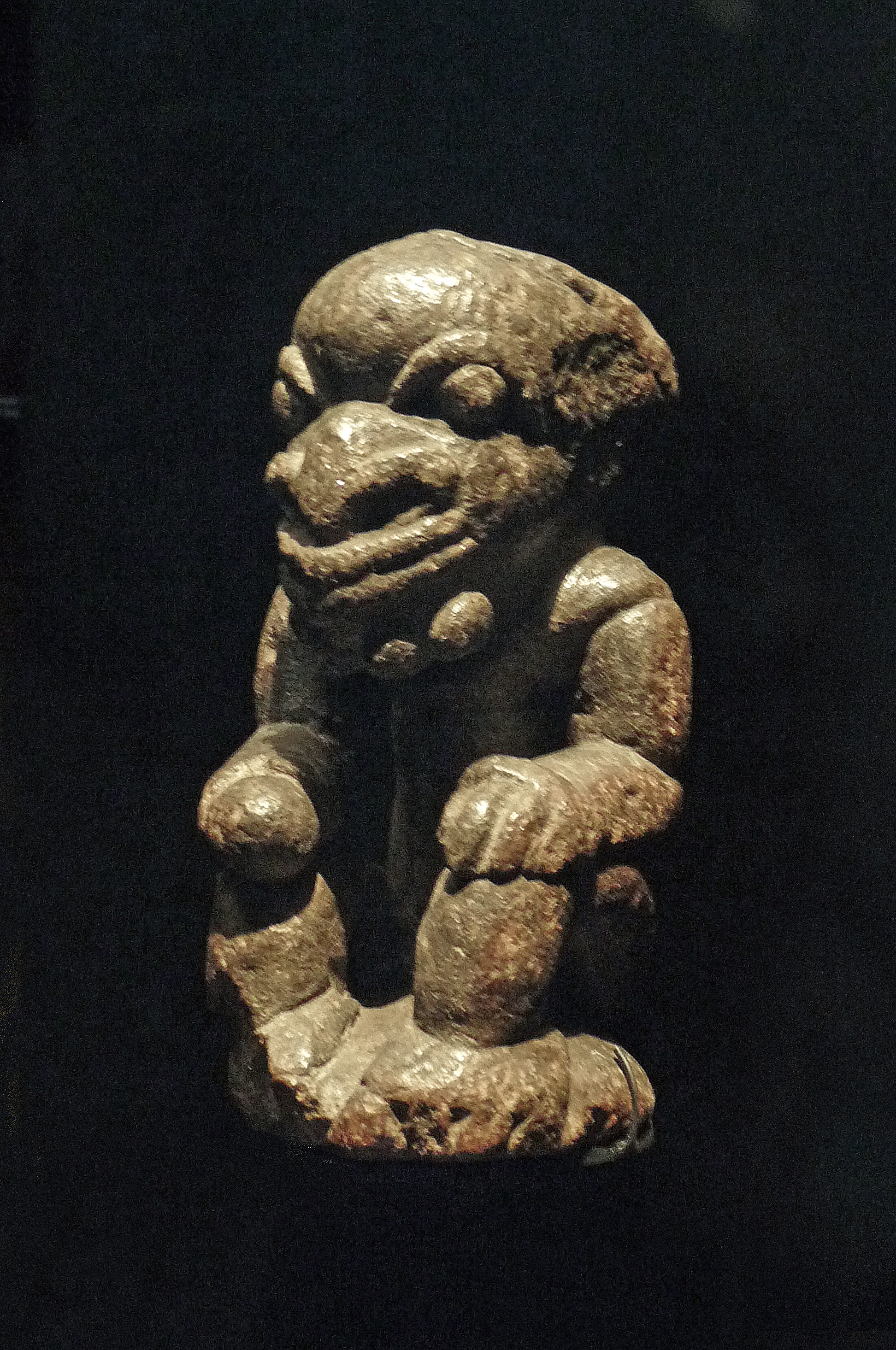
- A Nomoli figurine.
- Year: circa unknown
- Medium: Soapstone
- Dimensions: 17 cm × 10.2 cm (6.7 in × 4.0 in); 9 cm diameter (3.5 in)
- Weight: 1597 grams
- Location: Musée du quai Branly – Jacques Chirac, Paris, France
- Website: www.quaibranly.fr

A Nomoli (/ˈnoʊmoʊliː/) is a carved stone figurine native to Sierra Leone and Liberia. They are usually made of soapstone, limestone or granite.

== Origins ==
Nomoli figurines are among the earliest works of art from Sierra Leone. The figurines and similar stone sculptures are the only known remains of an empire that existed hundreds of years ago in what is now Sierra Leone and Liberia. Portuguese explorers first recorded the existence of the figurines in the fifteenth century.

Nomoli figurines are often associated with the Mende people as they are often buried on Mende land. The Mende and Kissi people of Sierra Leone place these small statues near their homes and in fields of crops as a form of protection, in the belief that the Nomoli figurines will give them good health and good harvests. They also consult the statues as oracles.

During the 20th century, Sierra Leonean immigrants brought their ancestors' Nomoli figurines with them to the United States as a way to preserve the spiritual powers of the past.

== Characteristics and description ==
Along the coastal region, Nomoli figurines are often carved into a crouching stance with a small object in its hands. Their heads are oblong in shape. Most figurines are made out of soapstone, limestone, steatite, and in some cases, granite. Nomoli figurines buried deeper underground tend to be better preserved than those discovered just beneath the surface.
