= Abia de las Torres =

Coordinates: 42°25′N 4°25′W

- municipality
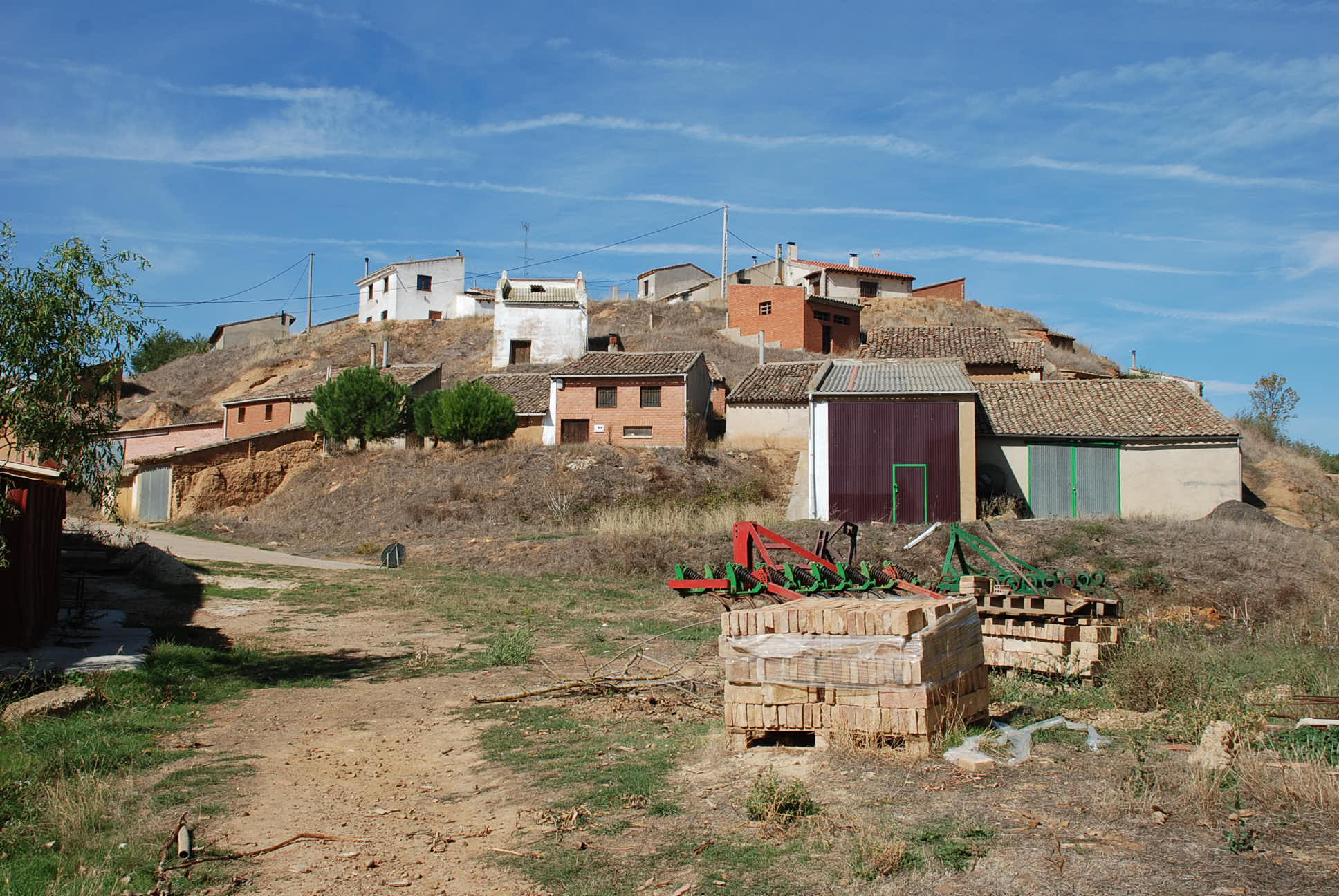
- View of the town

- Flag Coat of arms
- Interactive map of Abia de las Torres
- Country: Spain
- Autonomous community: Castile and León
- Province: Palencia
- Municipality: Abia de las Torres

Area
  - Total: 27.16 km^{2} (10.49 sq mi)
- Elevation: 840 m (2,760 ft)

Population (2025-01-01)
  - Total: 165
  - Density: 6.08/km^{2} (15.7/sq mi)
- Time zone: UTC+1 (CET)
  - Summer (DST): UTC+2 (CEST)
- Website: Official website

Abia de las Torres is a municipality located in the province of Palencia, Castile and León, Spain. According to the 2004 census (INE), the municipality had a population of 186 inhabitants.

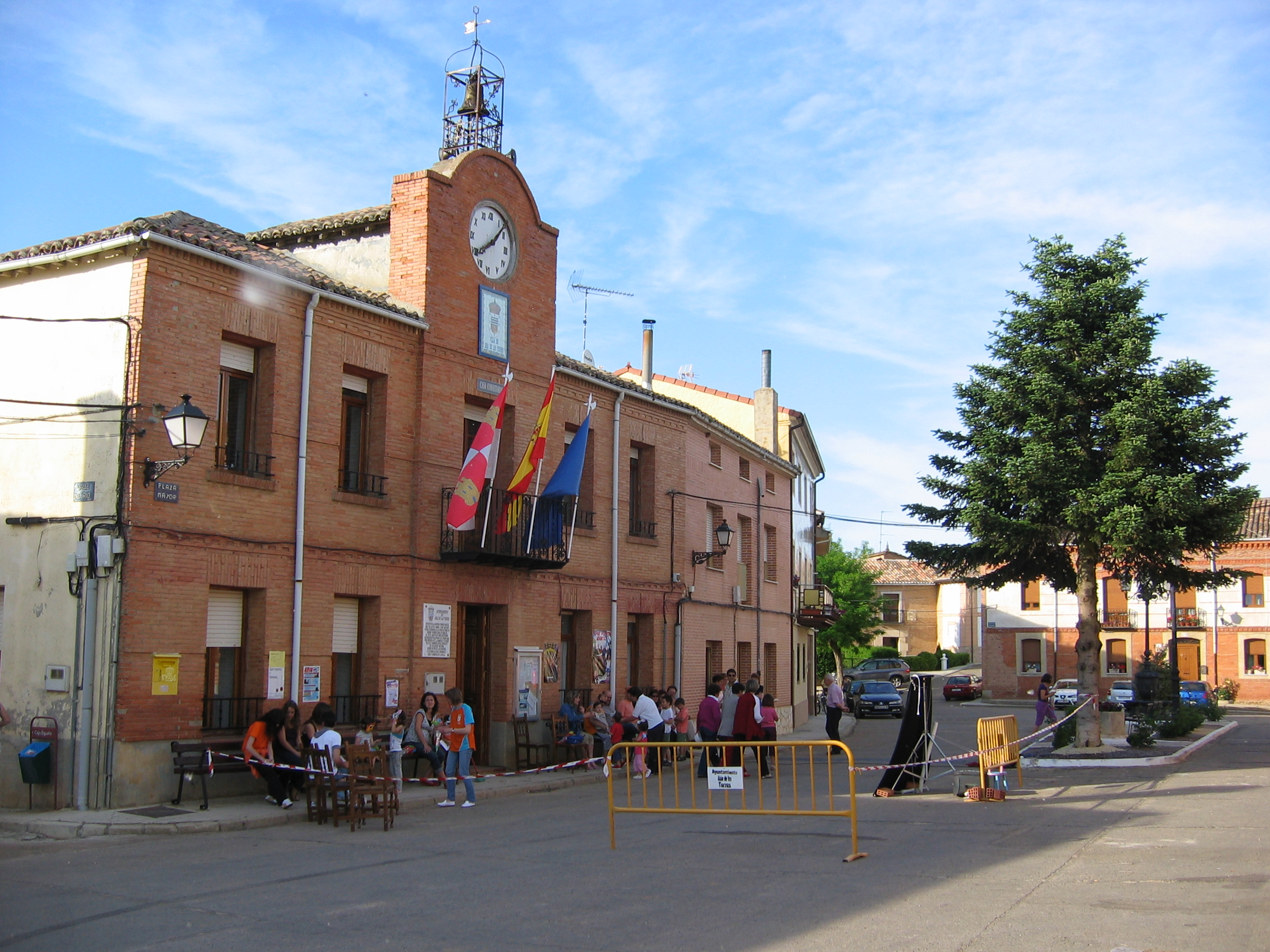
Plaza mayor and Ayuntamiento of Abia de las Torres

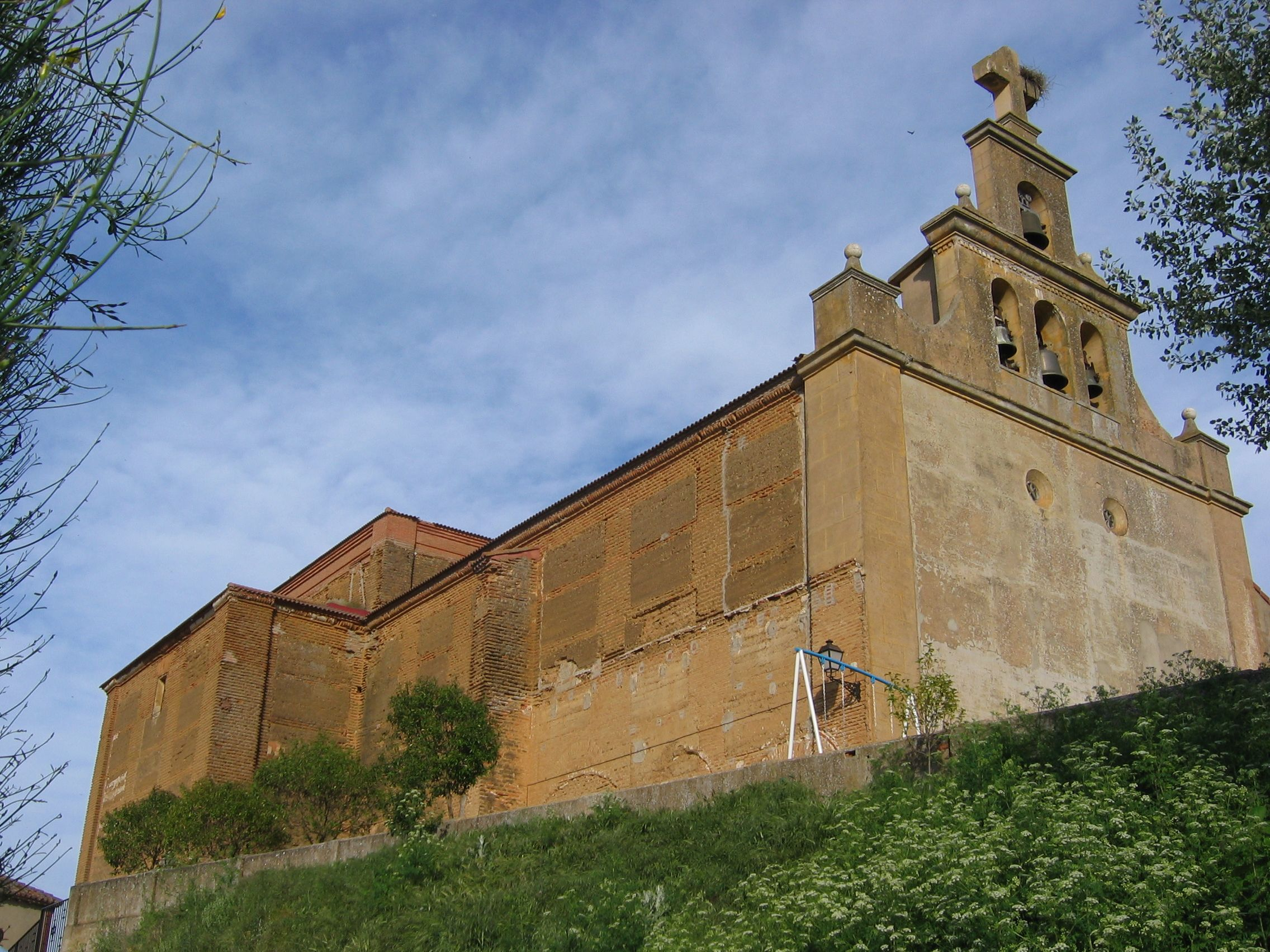
Abia de las Torres Church
