= Suryoyo language =

Suryoyo language may refer to:

- Turoyo language, also known as Surayt, a Central Neo-Aramaic language spoken by Assyrians in southern Turkey and northern Syria (as well as Mesopotamia)
- Mlahsô language, an extinct or dormant Central Neo-Aramaic language traditionally spoken in eastern Turkey
- Syriac language (Classical Syriac: ܣܘܪܝܝܐ, romanized: Suryāyā, Suryoyo), an Eastern Aramaic language, literary language of various Christian communities
- Neo-Aramaic languages of various dialects still used primarily by Assyrians and Syriac Christians

== See also ==
- Suryoyo or Assyrian people, an ethnic group indigenous to the Near East (Assyria)
- Assyrian (disambiguation)
- Syriac (disambiguation)
- Assyrian language (disambiguation)
- Western Assyrian (disambiguation)
- Aramean (disambiguation)
- Neo-Aramaic languages
