= Post-imperial Assyria =

Fifth period of Assyrian history

- 609 BC–c. AD 240
- Locations of the major sites of Assur, Nineveh and Arbela in modern Iraq
- Common languages: Aramaic, Akkadian, Greek
- Religion: Ancient Mesopotamian religion Hellenistic religion Judaism; Syriac Christianity
- Historical era: Classical antiquity
  - Fall of the Neo-Assyrian Empire: 609 BC
  - Conquest by the Achaemenid Empire: 539 BC
  - Conquests of Alexander the Great: 330 BC
  - Conquest by the Parthian Empire: c. 141 BC
  - Flourishing under Parthian suzerainty: 1st–2nd centuries AD
  - Sack of Assur by the Sasanian Empire: c. AD 240
Preceded by	Succeeded by
Neo-Assyrian Empire	Sasanian Empire
- Today part of: Iraq

The post-imperial period was the final stage of ancient Assyrian history, covering the history of the Assyrian heartland from the fall of the Neo-Assyrian Empire in 609 BC to the final sack and destruction of Assur, Assyria's ancient religious capital, by the Sasanian Empire c. AD 240. There was no independent Assyrian state during this time, with Assur and other Assyrian cities instead falling under the control of the successive Median (615–549 BC), Neo-Babylonian (612–539 BC), Achaemenid (539–330 BC), Seleucid (312–c. 141 BC) and Parthian (c. 141 BC–AD 224) empires. The period was marked by the continuance of ancient Assyrian culture, traditions and religion, despite the lack of an Assyrian kingdom. The ancient Assyrian dialect of the Akkadian language went extinct however, completely replaced by Aramaic by the 5th century BC.

During the fall of Assyria in the Medo-Babylonian conquest of the Assyrian Empire 626–609 BC, northern Mesopotamia was extensively sacked and destroyed by Median and Babylonian forces. The Babylonian kings, who annexed large parts of Assyria cared little for economically or socially developing the region and as such there was a dramatic decline in population density. Many of the greatest cities of the Neo-Assyrian period, such as Nineveh, were deserted and others, such as Assur, decreased dramatically in size and population. The region only began the process of recovery under the rule of the Achaemenid Empire. After his conquest of Babylon in 539, the Achaemenid king Cyrus the Great returned the cult statue of the Assyrian national deity Ashur to Assur. The Achaemenid practice of not interfering with local cultures, and the organization of the Assyrian lands into a single province, Athura, allowed Assyrian culture to endure.

Assyria was extensively resettled during the Seleucid and Parthian periods. In the last two centuries or so of Parthian rule, Assyria flourished; the great cities of old, such as Assur, Nineveh and Nimrud were resettled and expanded, old villages rebuilt and new settlements constructed. The population density of Parthian Assyria reached heights not seen since the Neo-Assyrian Empire. Much of Assyria was not ruled directly by the Parthians, but instead by a number of vassal kingdoms, such as Hatra and Adiabene, which had some Assyrian cultural influence. Assur, at this time at least two thirds of the size the city was during Neo-Assyrian times, appears to have been a semi-autonomous city-state, governed by a sequence of Assyrian city-lords who might have seen themselves as the successors of the ancient Assyrian kings. This latter-day Assyrian cultural golden age came to an end when Ardashir I of the Sasanian Empire overthrew the Parthians and, during his campaigns against them, extensively sacked Assyria and its cities.

== Terminology ==
The centuries that followed the fall of the Neo-Assyrian Empire are characterized by a distinct lack of surviving sources from Assyria. The textual and archaeological evidence is so scant that the period is often referred to as a "dark age" or simply called "post-Assyrian". Because Assyria continued to be viewed by its inhabitants and by foreigners as a distinct cultural and geographical entity, and (though never again fully independent) continued to at times be administrated separately, modern scholars prefer the name "post-imperial" for the period.

== History ==
=== Neo-Babylonian rule ===
Significant Assyrian sites in the Neo-Babylonian period

The fall of the Neo-Assyrian Empire after its final war with the Neo-Babylonian and Median empires dramatically changed the geopolitics of the Ancient Near East; Babylonia experienced an unprecedented time of prosperity and growth, trade routes were redrawn and the economical organization and political power of the entire region was restructured. It has long been disputed whether Assyria, or at least its northernmost portions along the Taurus Mountains, fell under the control of the Medes or the Babylonians, but sources are not unanimous and the situation is difficult to reconstruct.

Archaeological surveys of northern Mesopotamia have consistently shown that there was a dramatic decrease in the size and number of inhabited sites in Assyria during the Neo-Babylonian period, suggesting a significant societal breakdown in the region. Archaeological evidence suggests that the former Assyrian capital cities, such as Assur, Nimrud and Nineveh, were nearly completely abandoned. Some cities had been completely destroyed by the Medes and Babylonians in the war; the level of destruction and the sacking of Assyria's temples is described with horror and remorse in some of the contemporary Babylonian chronicles. The breakdown in society does not necessarily reflect an enormous drop in population; it is clear that the region became less rich and less densely populated, but it is also clear that Assyria was not entirely uninhabited, nor poor in any real sense. Many smaller settlements were probably abandoned due to the local agricultural organization being destroyed over the decades of war and unrest. Many Assyrians are likely to have died in the war with the Medes and Babylonians or due to its indirect consequences (i.e. dying of disease or starvation) and many probably moved from the region, or where forcefully deported, to Babylonia or elsewhere. Large portions of the remaining Assyrian populace might have turned to nomadism due to the collapse of the local settlements and economy.

Although the Neo-Babylonian kings largely kept the administration of the Assyrian Empire and at times drew on Assyrian rhetoric and symbols for legitimacy, particularly in the reign of Nabonidus (r. 556–539 BC, the last Neo-Babylonian king), they also at times worked to distance themselves from the Assyrian kings that had preceded them and never assumed the title 'king of Assyria'. Throughout the time of the Neo-Babylonian and Achaemenid empires, Assyria was a marginal and sparsely populated region, perhaps chiefly due to the limited interest of the Neo-Babylonian kings to invest resources into its economic and societal development. Individuals with Assyrian names are attested at multiple sites in Babylonia during the Neo-Babylonian Empire, including Babylon, Nippur, Uruk, Sippar, Dilbat and Borsippa. The Assyrians in Uruk apparently continued to exist as a community until the reign of the Achaemenid king Cambyses II (r. 530–522 BC) and were closely linked to a local cult dedicated to the Assyrian national deity Ashur.

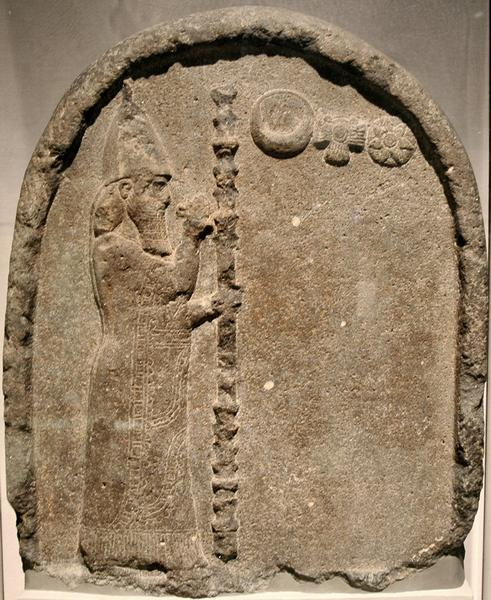
Stele of the Neo-Babylonian king Nabonidus (r. 556–539 BC), found at Harran

Though it is clear that recovery was slow and the evidence is scant, there was at least some continuity in administrative and governmental structures even within the former Assyrian heartland itself. At some point after the fall of Nineveh in 612 BC some of the faces in the reliefs of its palaces were destroyed, but there is no evidence for longer Babylonian or Median occupation of the site. At Dur-Katlimmu, one of the largest settlements along the Khabur river, a large Assyrian palace, dubbed the "Red House" by archaeologists, continued to be used in Neo-Babylonian times, with cuneiform records there being written by people with Assyrian names, in Assyrian style, though dated to the reigns of the early Neo-Babylonian kings. Two Neo-Babylonian texts discovered at the city of Sippar in Babylonia attest to there being royally appointed governors at both Assur and Guzana, another Assyrian site in the north. The cult statue of Ashur, stolen from Assur during its sack in 614, was however never returned by the Babylonians and was instead kept in the Esagila temple in Babylon. At some other sites, work was slower. Arbela is attested as a thriving city, but only very late in the Neo-Babylonian period, and there were no attempts to revive the city of Arrapḫa until the reign of Neriglissar (r. 560–556 BC), who returned a cult statue to the site. Harran was revitalized, with its great temple dedicated to the lunar god Sîn being rebuilt under Nabonidus. Nabonidus's fascination with Harran and Sîn have led modern researchers to speculate that he himself, a usurper genealogically unconnected to earlier Babylonian kings, was of Assyrian ancestry and originated from Harran. Nabonidus did go to some length to revive Assyrian symbols, such as wearing a wrapped cloak in his depictions, absent in those of other Babylonian kings but present in Assyrian art. Some Assyriologists, such as Stephen Herbert Langdon and Stephanie Dalley, have also gone as far as to suggest that he was a descendant of the Sargonid dynasty, Assyria's final ruling dynasty, as a grandson of either Esarhaddon (r. 681–669 BC) or Ashurbanipal (r. 669–631 BC), though this is disputed given the lack of strong evidence.

=== Achaemenid rule ===
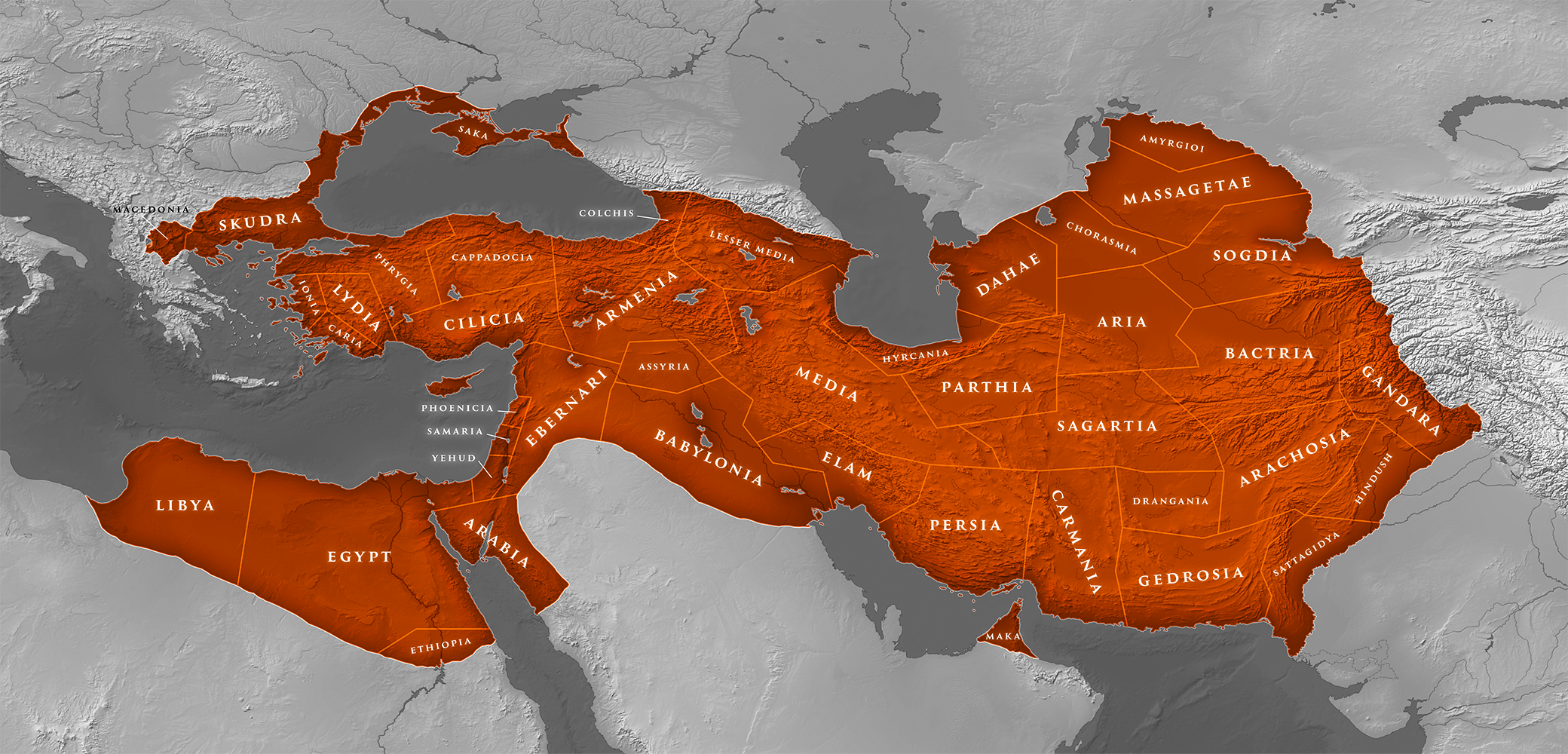
Map of the Achaemenid Empire under Xerxes I c. 480 BC, including the province of Assyria (Athura)

The Persians first entered Assyrian territory in 547 BC, when the founder of the Achaemenid Empire, Cyrus the Great, crossed the Tigris river and marched south of Arbela while campaigning against the Medes. Assyria probably came under Achaemenid control in late 539, shortly after Cyrus conquered Babylon in October. Under the Achaemenids, most of Assyria was organized into the province (Note: Though often referred to as a satrapy by modern historians, Assyria appears in Achaemenid royal inscriptions as a dahyu; a term of uncertain implications used to refer to both peoples and geographical locations (not necessarily synonymous with the formal satrapies of the empire).) Athura (Aθūrā), (Note: The name Athura derived from the Aramaic Athur, which meant Assyria.) but some was incorporated into the satrapy of Media (Mada). The organization of most of Assyria into the single administrative unit Athura effectively kept the region on the map as a distinct political entity throughout the time of Achaemenid rule. In Achaemenid inscriptions on the royal tombs of the kings, Athura is consistently mentioned as one of the empire's provinces, next to, but distinct from, Babylonia. Some of the Achaemenid tombs depict the Assyrians as one of the ethnic groups of the empire, alongside the others. The Achaemenid kings interfered little with the internal affairs of their individual provinces as long as tribute and taxes were continuously provided, which allowed Assyrian culture and customs to survive under Persian rule. After the Achaemenid conquest, the inhabitants of Assur even received the permission of Cyrus the Great to at last rebuild the city's ancient temple dedicated to Ashur and Cyrus even returned Ashur's cult statue from Babylon. Cult statues might also have been returned to Nineveh, though the relevant inscription is damaged and could refer to another city. Just as during the Neo-Assyrian Empire, the lingua franca of the Achaemenid Empire was Aramaic. By this time, the Aramaic script was often referred to as the "Assyrian script".

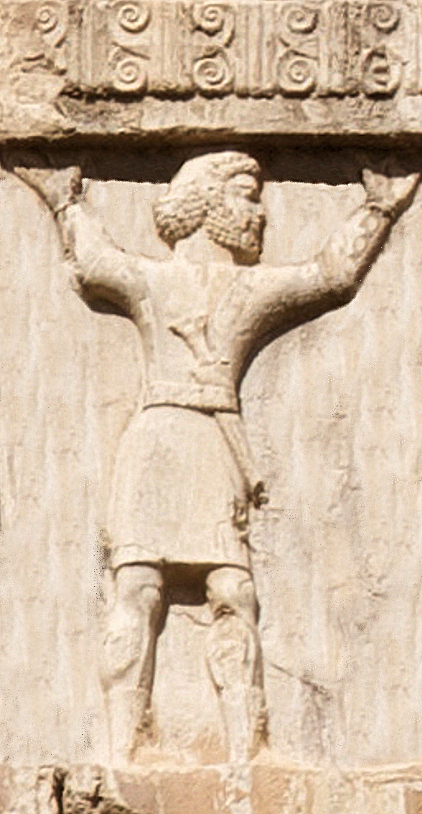
Depiction of an Assyrian soldier on the tomb of Xerxes I at Naqsh-e Rostam

It is not known how Athura was organized internally. An Aramaic letter sent by the governor of Egypt in the late 5th century BC attests to the presence of Achaemenid officials at the cities of Arbela, Lair, Arzuhin and Matalubaš, which suggests that there was a certain level of administrative organization in the region. At Tell ed-Daim, located on the Little Zab northeast of Kirkuk, an Achaemenid administrative building of substantial size (26 by 22 meters; 85 by 72 ft), probably a palace of a local governor or official, has been excavated.

A few years after the Egyptian governor's letter, Xenophon, a Greek military leader and historian, marched with the Ten Thousand through much of the northwestern Achaemenid Empire, including Assyria, in 401 BC. In his later writings, Xenophon provided an eye-witness account of the region. Xenophon described Assyria, which he thought was a part of Media, as largely uninhabited south of the Great Zab, but dotted with many small and prosperous villages close to the Little Zab and north of Nineveh, especially in the foothills of the Taurus Mountains. Xenophon mentioned three Assyrian cities along the Tigris by name, though the names he gave for them appear to be invented by himself; the cities Larissa (Nimrud) and Mespila (Nineveh) (Note: If not invented by Xenophon, the name Mespila for Nineveh could perhaps be derived from the Akkadian term mušpalum, used for the site in some of Sennacherib's inscriptions, or the Aramaic mšpyl, meaning an area of low-lying terrain.) are described as ruined and deserted, but Kainai (Assur) is described as both large and prosperous, something that is not apparent from the archaeological record of the site during this time. The use of the strange names is perplexing given that later Greek and Roman authors were aware of the locations of the ancient Assyrian cities and their names; in the writings of figures such as Strabo, Tacitus and Ptolemy, Nineveh is called Ninos and is known to have been a great Assyrian capital and the region around Nimrud is dubbed Kalakēne (after the city's alternate name Kalhu). Arbela is known to have remained an important administrative center under the Achaemenid Empire, as historical accounts of the campaigns of Alexander the Great describe that city as the local base of operations of Darius III, the empire's final king.

Individuals with clearly Assyrian names are known from Achaemenid times, just as they are from Neo-Babylonian times, and they sometimes reached high positions in government. For instance, the secretary of Cyrus the Great's son Cambyses II, before Cambyses became king, was named Pan-Ashur-lumur (a name clearly incorporating Ashur). In terms of geopolitics, the Assyrians are mentioned most prominently in the reign of Darius the Great (r. 522–486 BC). In 520 BC, Assyrians of both Athura and Media joined forces in an unsuccessful revolt against Darius, alongside other peoples of the Achaemenid Empire (including the Medes, Elamites and Babylonians). The Assyrians are then mentioned in the writings of the near-contemporary Greek historian Herodotus as contributing to the construction of the royal palace of Darius at Susa from 500 to 490, with Assyrians from Media contributing gold works and glazing and Assyrians from Athura contributing timber.

=== Seleucid rule ===
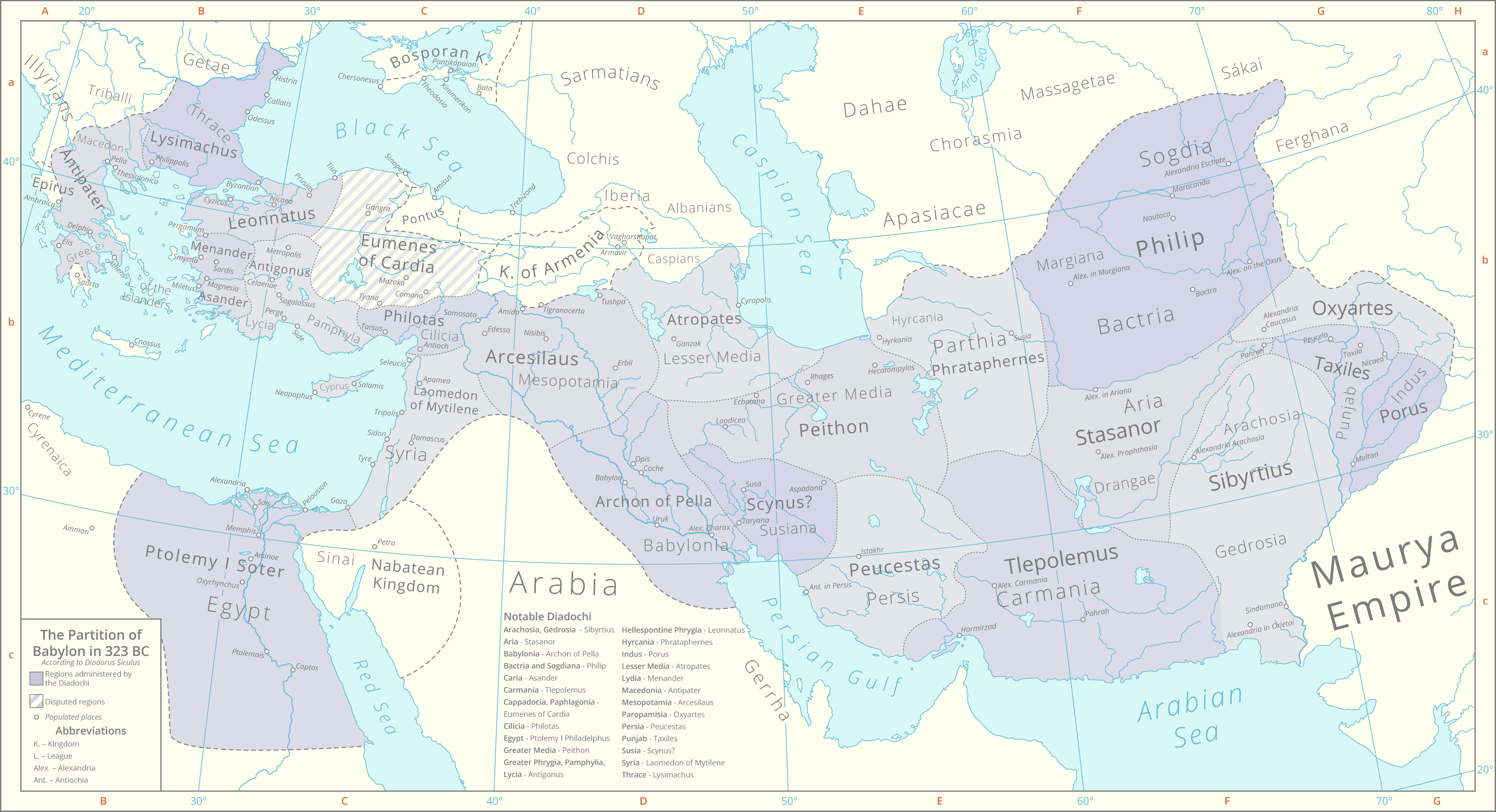
Allotment of satrapies at the Partition of Babylon in 323 BC, after the death of Alexander the Great. The majority of these lands eventually came under the rule of the Seleucid Empire.

In the aftermath of the Achaemenid Empire's conquest by Alexander the Great, Assyria and much of the rest of the former Achaemenid lands came under the control of the Seleucid Empire, founded by Seleucus I Nicator, one of Alexander's generals. Though Assyria was centrally located within this empire, and must have been a significant base of power, the region is mentioned very rarely in textual sources from the period. This might perhaps be explained by the political and economic centers of the Seleucid Empire being in heavily urbanized Babylonia in the south, particularly in Babylon itself and the new city Seleucia, and in Syria in the west, particularly the empire's western capital Antioch. Though the Seleucids adopted a policy of hellenization and often emphasized their Hellenic origin, they also at times took on or played into the cultures of the people they ruled. Perhaps as a result of this, and of the Seleucid Empire governing virtually all of the Assyrian Empire's old lands (other than Egypt, which was only briefly under Assyrian control), a handful of ancient documents correlate the Seleucid Empire to "Assyria". (Note: Both the Dead Sea Scrolls and the Babylonian Talmud call the empire Ašūr and the Romano-Jewish historian Josephus referred to it as Assuríōn basileía ("kingdom of the Assyrians).)

Though the Seleucids kept the eastern satrapies of their empire largely the same as under the Achaemenid Empire, the surviving evidence suggests that the territories in northern Mesopotamia (i.e. Assyria) were politically reorganized. The historian Diodorus Siculus mentioned in his writings that a satrapy of Mesopotamia (consisting of only the northern part of that region as the southern part formed the satrapy of Babylonia) was created in 323 BC, and mentions both the satrapies Mesopotamia and Arbelitis (i.e. the region around Arbela) in 320. Though Assyria remained in the shadow of Babylonia, the region was far from wholly neglected. Nimrud was occupied throughout the Seleucid period, as the site preserves several levels from this time, and the presence of Seleucid coins and pottery at Assur demonstrates that the ancient Assyrian capital experienced the beginnings of a period of regrowth as well. It is possible that the deserted Nineveh was resettled under the Seleucids as well, given that there are sculptures of Greek mythological figures such as the god Hermes and the demigod Heracles known from the site, as well as inscriptions written by people with Greek names, though much of this evidence dates to the succeeding period of Parthian rule. Because of the distinctive appearance of Seleucid pottery, sites occupied during the Seleucid period are easily identifiable in the archaeological record. Archaeological surveys in northern Mesopotamia have been able to demonstrate that there was a widespread, though not necessarily very dense, resettlement of villages in Assyria under the Seleucids.

The Seleucid Empire fell apart due to internal strife, dynastic conflict and wars with foreign enemies. As the empire collapsed, virtually all of its eastern territories were conquered by Mithridates I of the Parthian Empire between 148 and 141 BC. The exact time when Assyria came under Parthian control is not known, but it was either during these conquests or at some point before 96, when it is securely known that the region was under Parthian rule due to records of border agreements between the Parthians and the Roman Republic.

=== Parthian suzerainty ===
==== Organization and revival ====
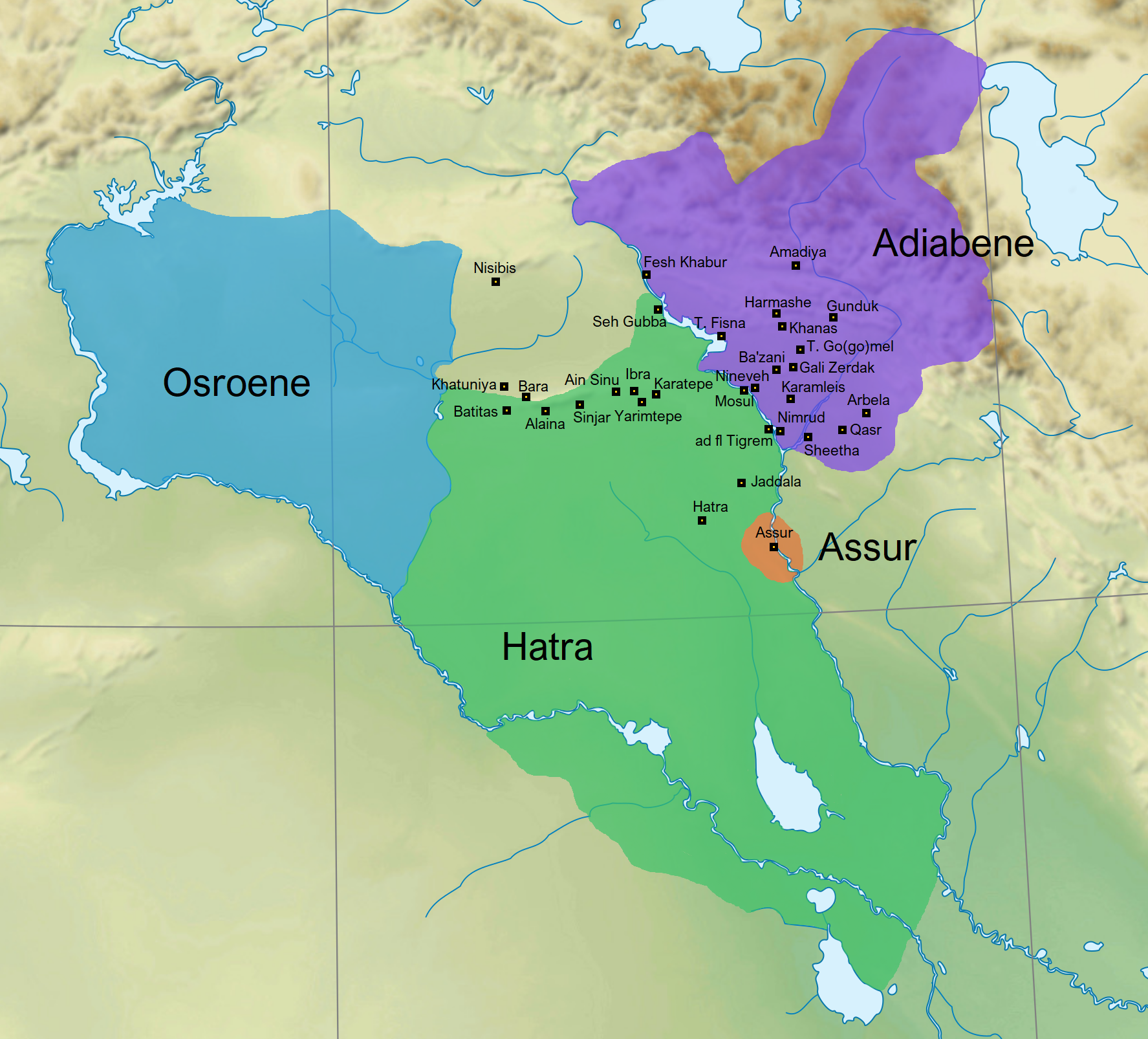
Approximate borders of the semi-autonomous northern Mesopotamian vassal kingdoms Osroene, Adiabene and Hatra, and the semi-autonomous Assur city-state, in AD 200. Osroene was a vassal of the Roman Empire, whereas the others were Parthian vassals. Also marked on the map are important sites and cities in the former Assyrian heartland that were occupied during this time.

Under Parthian suzerainty, several small and semi-independent kingdoms with Assyrian character and large populations cropped up in northern Mesopotamia, including Osroene, Adiabene and the Kingdom of Hatra. These kingdoms lasted until the 3rd or 4th centuries AD, though they were mostly ruled by dynasties of Iranian or Arab descent and culture. This is not to say that aspects of old Assyrian culture did not live on in these new kingdoms or that the rulers of their rulers were not influenced by the local populace; for instance, the main god worshipped at Hatra was the old Mesopotamian sun-god Shamash. A few exceptions to the sequences of non-native rulers also existed; the name of the earliest known king of Adiabene, Abdissares, is clearly of Aramaic origin and means "servant of Ishtar". Some portions of former Assyria were placed under direct Parthian control; Beth Nuhadra (modern Duhok) was for instance not ruled by a local dynasty but converted into a military province governed by a royally appointed Nohodar military official. Because of scarcity of documentation and the region often being politically unstable, the precise boundaries and political status of many locations is not entirely clear throughout the Parthian period; minor Armenian principalities in the highlands and mountains in far northern Mesopotamia established in the Seleucid period, such as Sophene, Zabdicene, Corduene, may have also preserved some independence or autonomy in Parthian times.

Whereas Osroene fell under Roman influence and control, most of Assyria was under Parthian control, though divided between Adiabene, which was based in Arbela, and Hatra. The region remained an integral part of the Parthian Empire until its fall in the 3rd century AD. Though some Roman authors, such as Pliny the Elder, equated Adiabene with Assyria (referring to Assyria as an older synonym of Adiabene), most contemporaries saw Adiabene as only controlling the central part of Assyria. The equation of Adiabene with Assyria would also sometimes be made in the later Sasanian period, when the Sasanian province Adiabene in some cases was called "Athuria".

The slow resettlement and recovery of Assyria under the Seleucid Empire continued under Parthian rule. Helped by favorable climate conditions and political stability, this age of recovery culminated in an unprecedented return to prosperity and a remarkable revival under the last two centuries or so of Parthian rule. Archaeological surveys of sites of the Parthian period in Assyria demonstrate an enormous density of settlements that is only comparable to what the region was like under the Neo-Assyrian Empire. Under the Parthians, intense settlement took place throughout Assyria, with new villages being constructed and old villages being expanded and rebuilt.

The Seleucid and Parthian resettlement of Nineveh involved the construction of both residential houses and new sanctuaries and temples, with archaeological evidence having survived of both. Among the temples restored were the "Ezida" temple on the Kuyunjik mound (Note: The northern mound (of two mounds) in Nineveh and the site of the city's greatest palaces and temples.) in the city, rebuilt in its original place and dedicated to the same god it was dedicated to in ancient times, Nabu. An inscription is preserved from this temple, dated to Parthian rule in 32/31 BC, by a Greek worshipper named Apollophanes, who dedicated it to the strategos (Note: Greek titles such as strategos are also attested to have been used for Parthian-period governors in other cities that were prominent under the Seleucids, such as at Dura-Europos and Babylon.) of Nineveh, Apollonios. Archaeological evidence shows that the throne room of the former Southwest Palace, built by the Assyrian king Sennacherib, was converted into a religious sanctuary dedicated to Heracles. Called Ninos in Greek, Nineveh was for most of the Parthian period under the control of Adiabene and though not a great political center, the city retained its local importance as a market-settlement along the Tigris river throughout this time. Nineveh was relatively Hellenized, with its population worshipping syncretistic Greco-Mesopotamian deities and many being able to speak Greek, but the predominant language in the city and in the surrounding countryside likely remained Aramaic.

==== Parthian Assur ====
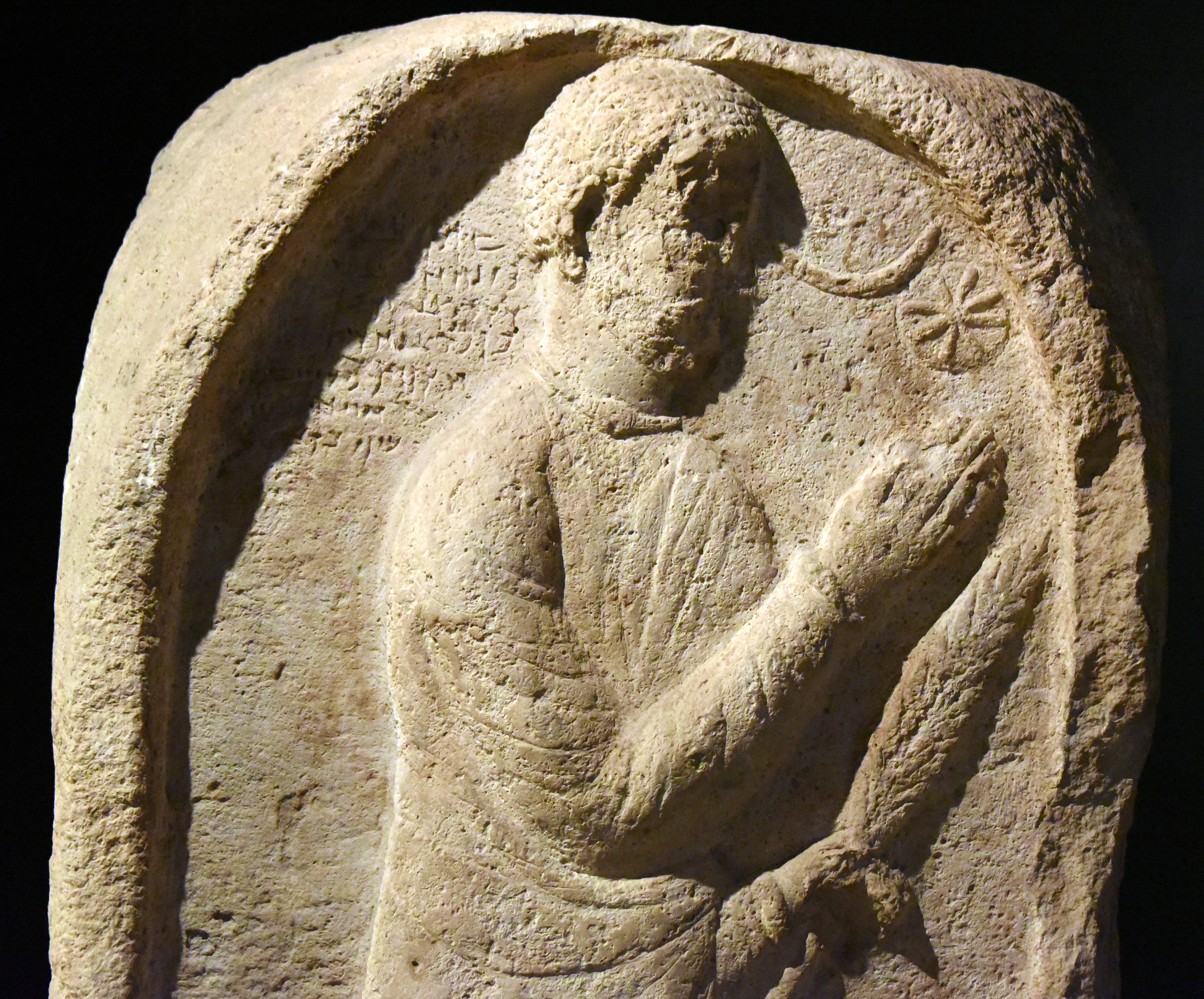
Detail of a stele in the style of the Neo-Assyrian royal steles erected in Assur in the 2nd century AD (under Parthian rule) by the local ruler Rʻuth-Assor

Assur, perhaps now known under the name Labbana (derived from Libbali, "heart of the city", the ancient Assyrian name for the city's temple quarter) flourished under Parthian rule, with many buildings being either repaired or constructed from scratch. (Note: The city's history was not entirely peaceful and prosperous throughout the entire period of Parthian rule. Three distinct phases of construction can be observed in the archaeological evidence from the site; all of which ended in large-scale damage and destruction. The first two phases of construction came to their ends in AD 116 and 198 when the city was sacked by Roman emperors Trajan and Septimius Severus, respectively.) Per the historian Peter Haider, "after the Parthian conquest of Mesopotamia, Assur came to life again". From around or shortly after the end of the 2nd century BC, the city may have become the capital of its own small semi-autonomous realm, either under the suzerainty of Hatra, or under direct Parthian suzerainty. Among the buildings constructed was a new local palace, dubbed the "Parthian Palace" by historians. All in all, the buildings built under the Parthian period cover about two thirds of the area of the city as it was in Neo-Assyrian times. Stelae erected by the local rulers of Assur in this time resemble the stelae erected by the Neo-Assyrian kings, though the rulers are depicted in Parthian-style trouser-suits rather than ancient garb. The rulers used the title maryo of Assur ("master of Assur") and appear to have viewed themselves as continuing the old Assyrian royal tradition. These stelae retain the shape, framing and placement (often in city gates) of stelae erected under the ancient kings and also depict the central figure in reverence of the moon and sun, an ever-present motif in the ancient royal stelae.

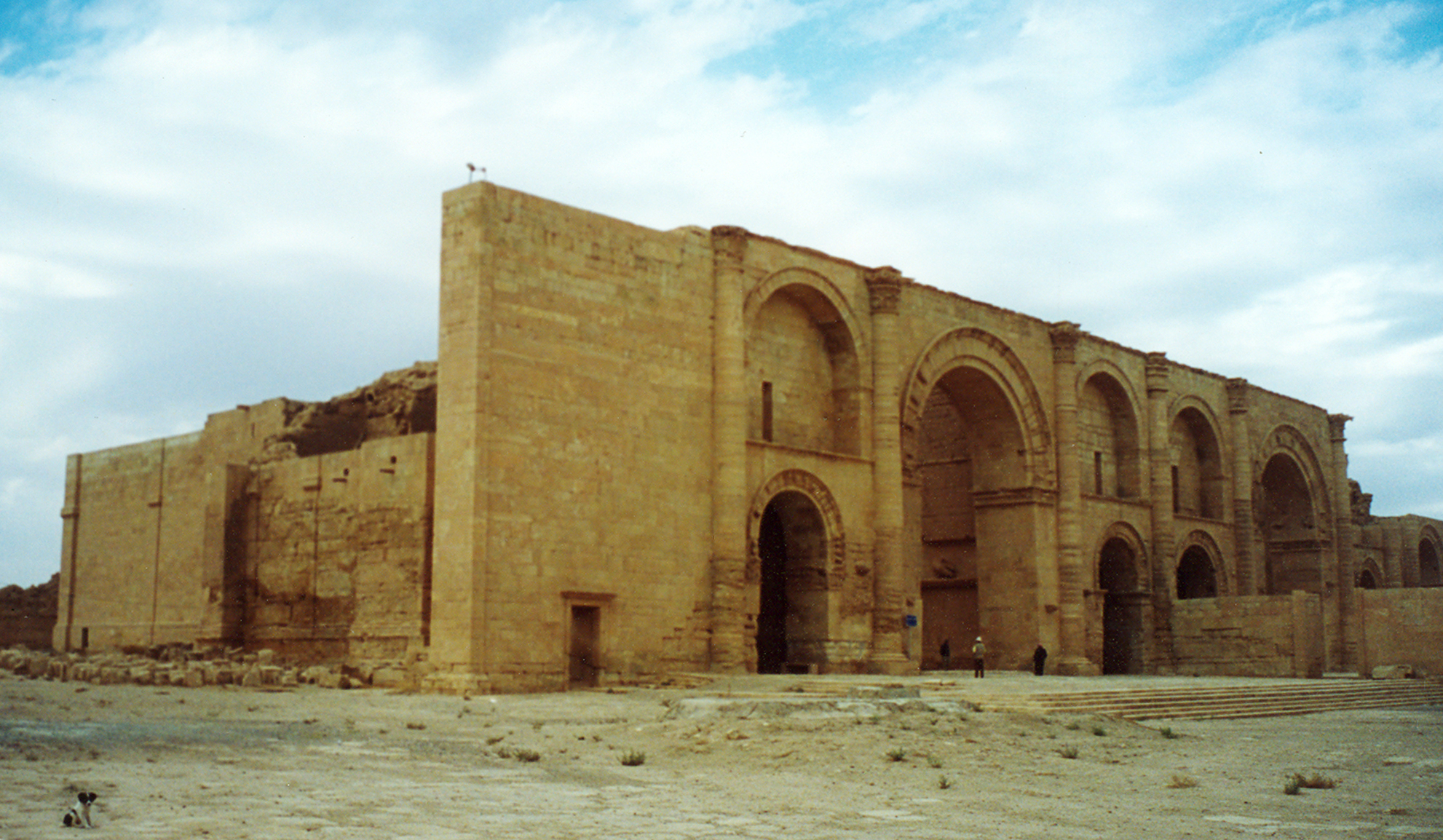
The Great Iwans at Hatra. The rebuilt Ashur temple at Assur was likely similar to this building in appearance and size.

The ancient temple dedicated to Ashur was restored for a second time in the 2nd century AD. Though the adornment of the buildings reflect a certain Hellenistic character, their design is also reminiscent of old Assyrian and Babylonian buildings, with some Parthian influences. Personal names in Assur at this time greatly resemble personal names from the Neo-Assyrian period, with individuals like Qib-Assor ("command of Ashur"), Assor-tares ("Ashur judges") and even Assor-heden ("Ashur has given a brother", a late version of the name Aššur-aḫu-iddina, i.e. Esarhaddon). Later Syriac Christian hagiographic sources demonstrate that the Assyrian populace of the Parthian period took great pride in their Assyrian ancestry, with some among the local nobility claiming descent from the Assyrian kings of old.

In 220, Ardashir I of the Sasanians, the king of Persis, rebelled against the Parthians and in 226, he succeeded in capturing the imperial capital of Ctesiphon. The Parthian vassal states lingered on only for a time in Assyria and Armenia. The king of Hatra, Sanatruq II, fended off a Sasanian attack in 228/229, but Hatra was defeated and conquered by Ardashir in 240/241, after a two-year long siege. Ardashir had Hatra destroyed, and the wars also caused a depopulation of the surrounding region. Assyria's last golden age came to an end with the Sasanian sack of Assur, which took place either during Ardashir's first campaign against Hatra in 228/229, or in the later campaign c. 240. During the sack, Ashur's temple was destroyed again and the city's population was dispersed. Having been firmly tied to Assur and Ashur since the foundation of their civilization, the final destruction of Ashur's temple, more than 800 years after the fall of the Neo-Assyrian Empire, represented the definitive end to the once mighty ancient Assyrian civilization. The Assyrian people survived this final end and remain an ethnic minority in the region and elsewhere to this day.

== Archaeological evidence ==
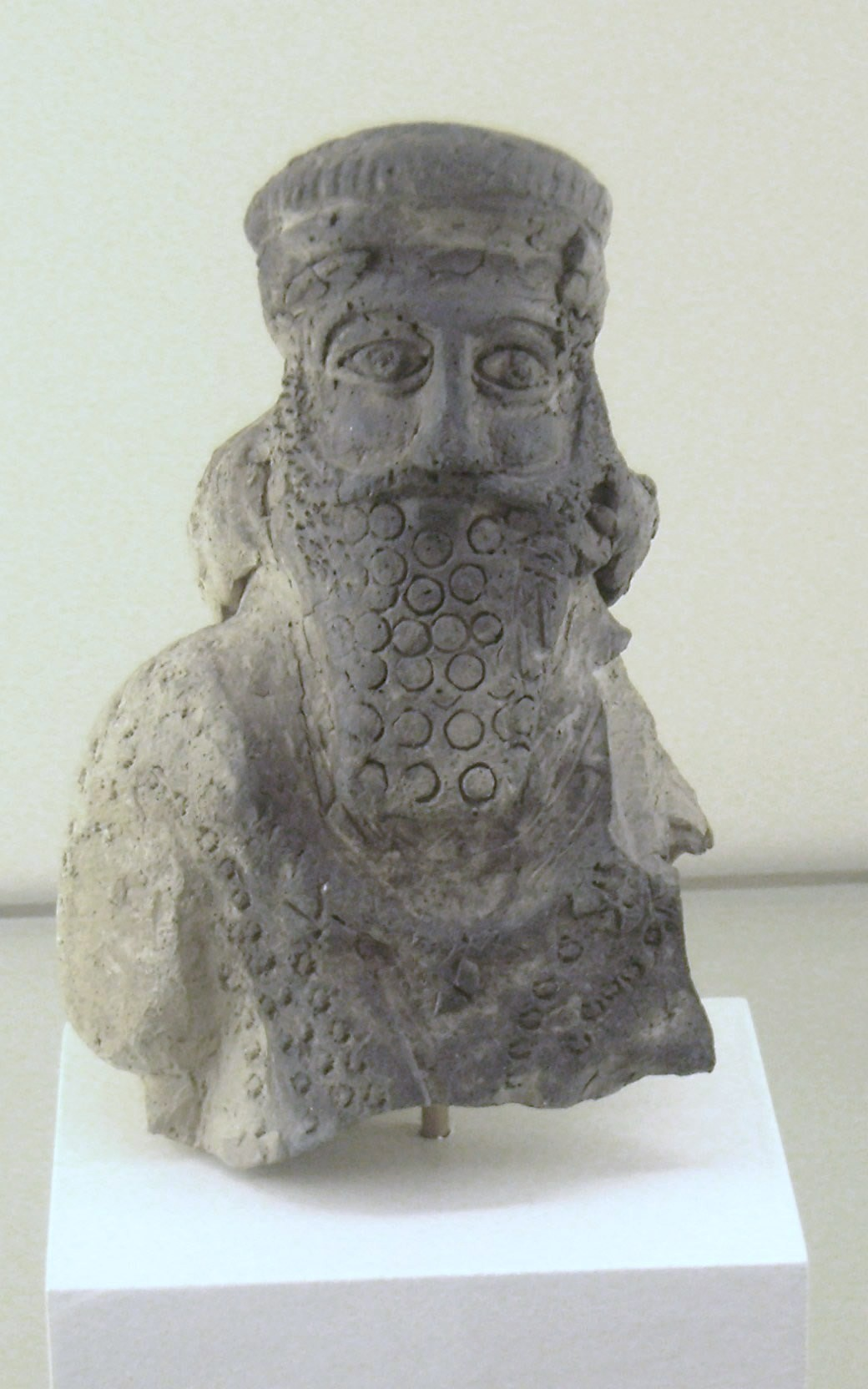
Terracotta figure of a Parthian king, found at Assur

The periods of Babylonian and Achaemenid rule over Assyria are the most scarce when it comes to surviving sources and archaeological evidence. There is no archaeological evidence, beyond the limited evidence from Dur-Katlimmu (which only attest to a few decades of occupation at most), that any of the old Assyrian palaces were ever again used as official governmental seats after the fall of the Neo-Assyrian Empire. Some archaeological evidence indicates that Assur was rebuilt at a much smaller scale in the Neo-Babylonian period, with only a few smaller structures of Babylonian character known. Evidence of squatter occupation of some sites has been uncovered, such as scant archaeological finds indicating repair-work and the construction of small houses and workshops at Nimrud, Dur-Sharrukin and Assur in the Neo-Babylonian and Achaemenid periods. A small collection of cuneiform texts is also known from Neo-Babylonian Assur, which among other things demonstrate that goldsmiths were active in the city.

The archaeological evidence is also scant from the Seleucid period and it consists mainly of coinage and characteristic Seleucid pottery types, such as bowls and fishplates with incurved rims. The most extensive Assyrian archaeological finds from the post-imperial period are from the time of Parthian rule over the region. At Assur, many Aramaic inscriptions have been found from the Parthian period, as well as ruins of sanctuaries and residential areas. Parthian Assur in many ways was a combination of old and new, with several ancient Assyrian temples rebuilt on top of their old foundations, though with stylistic elements combining old native Mesopotamian and new Parthian architectural styles. Exactly on top of the old temple dedicated to Ashur, a tripartite temple was constructed in the Parthian period. In shape and size, this new temple was likely similar to the Great Iwans at Hatra, a mighty temple structure. The ruins of personal houses indicate that they followed Parthian designs. The Parthians rebuilt even the old Assyrian festival house, exactly according to its original plan.

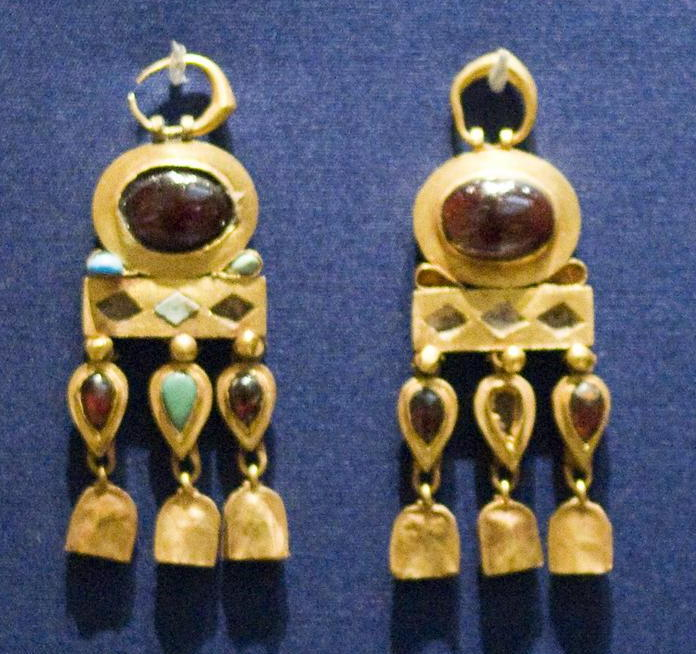
Parthian jewelry found at Nineveh

Most of the archaeological finds from Seleucid and Parthian Nineveh are from the Kuyunjik mound, with knowledge of much of the lower city itself only deriving from a small number of chance discoveries. Among these chance discoveries are the remains of an altar dedicated to the strategos Appolonios and a temple dedicated to the god Hermes, as well as traces of graves. The Kuyunjik mound was evidently covered with substantial buildings, traces of which were uncovered in the form of their stone foundations and assorted fragments. Great temples were built and maintained under both the Seleucids and Parthians, and several statues in both Greek and Parthian style, most fragmentary but a handful intact, have been found. Among the most famous discoveries from Kuyunjik is a well-preserved statue of Herakles Epitrapezios (an aspect or epithet of the demigod Heracles). In addition to great temples, the Kuyunjik mound was also covered in smaller residential buildings, evident by the presence of great numbers of small objects, including figurines and pottery. As Nineveh was located closer to the border with the Roman Empire than Assur, it frequently came into contact with the Roman world, both through trade and through Roman expeditions invading or raiding the region. Both Parthian and Roman silver coins are known from the site. Roman military equipment, including a belt fitting and a set of helmets, have also been found at Nineveh, probably lost in the confusion of war.

== Language ==
The official language of the Assyrian Empire was the Assyrian dialect of the Akkadian language. Usage of this language was already becoming more restricted in Neo-Assyrian times due to the growth of Aramaic. By the last few decades of the Neo-Assyrian Empire, Aramaic was the main spoken language of the empire. Despite the centuries of foreign rule, and influence of foreign languages such as Greek, the predominant language in the cities and countryside of Assyria likely remained Aramaic throughout the post-imperial period. The Assyrian dialect of the Akkadian language itself remained in use for some time after the fall of the Assyrian Empire, though in a much restricted capacity, probably not going extinct until around the end of the 6th century BC.

The language commonly spoken by modern Assyrians, Suret, resembles Akkadian very little and is instead a Neo-Aramaic language, descended from the Aramaic dialects of the post-imperial period. Modern Aramaic retains some ancient Akkadian influence, as there are several known examples of Akkadian loanwords in the ancient and modern Aramaic dialects. The Syriac language, an Aramaic dialect today mainly used liturgical language, has at least fourteen exclusive (i.e. not attested in other dialects) loanwords from Akkadian, including nine of which are clearly from the ancient Assyrian dialect (six of which are architectural or topographical terms).

== Religion ==
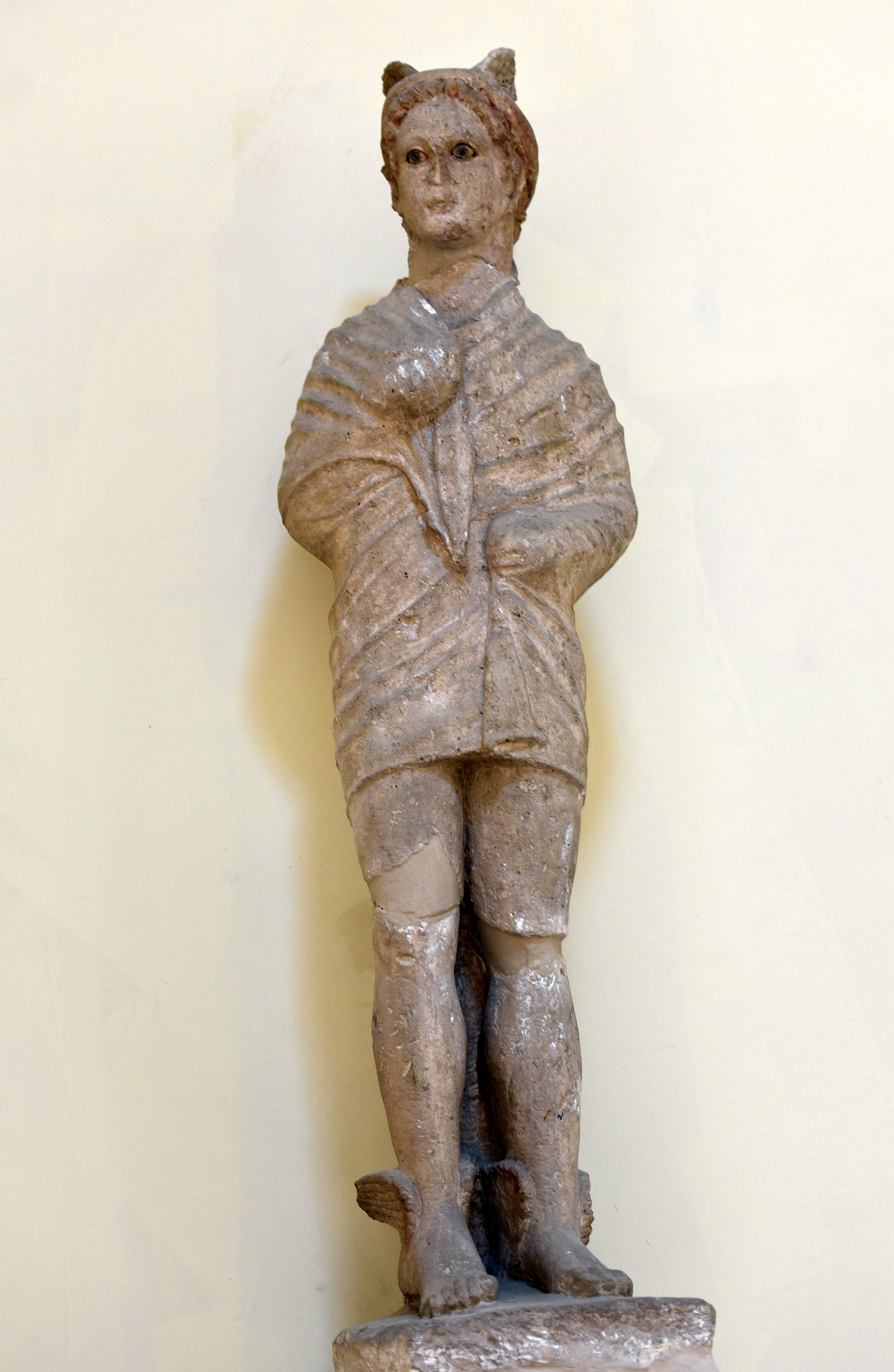
2nd-century BC statue of the ancient Greek god Hermes, found at Nineveh

The Assyrians at Assur continued to follow the ancient Mesopotamian religion in the post-imperial period, and continued to especially venerate their national deity Ashur. In many other parts of northern Mesopotamia, religious traditions quickly diverged and developed in different directions. In particular, there was from the time of Seleucid rule onwards significant influence of ancient Greek religion, with many Greek deities becoming syncretized with Mesopotamian deities. There was also some influence of Judaism, given that the kings of Adiabene converted to Judaism in the 1st century AD. Though outside Assyria proper, excavations of the Parthian-age sections of the nearby site Dura-Europos found a temple with a diverse arrangement of deities, a Christian church and a Jewish synagogue, all dating to the 3rd century AD. This religious and cultural complexity is likely to also have been reflected within Assyria, as it was now a frontier region between the Roman and Parthian empires.

At Assur, both old and new gods were worshipped. Most important was Ashur, in Parthian times known as Assor or Asor, whose worship was carried out in the same way as it had been in ancient times, per a cultic calendar effectively identical to that used under the Neo-Assyrian Empire. Because personal inscriptions at the temples in Assur frequently mention the month Nisan (the first month of the year) it is evident that the traditional Mesopotamian Akitu festival (celebrated in this month) continued to be celebrated. One of the temples built in the Parthian period included in its cult room a stele with a high relief depicting the demigod Heracles with a lion's skin over his left arm and resting his right hand on a club. Based on evidence from Hatra and Palmyra, Heracles was likely identified with the Semitic deity of fortune, Gad. It is also apparent that Heracles was identified in Mesopotamia with the god Nergal, as attested by inscriptions found elsewhere and by inscriptions from the Parthian period at Assur mentioning Nergal, but not Heracles. Graffiti and inscriptions scratched into the floor and walls of the rebuilt Parthian Ashur temple indicate that the most important deities were Ashur and his consort Serua, since they are the most frequently mentioned. Other deities that are mentioned, though less frequently, include Nabu and Nane ("the daughter of Bel"). The god Bel, otherwise mainly a Babylonian deity, was also worshipped in his own temple in the city. The inscriptions, temples, continued celebration of festivals and the wealth of theophoric elements (divine names) in personal names of the Parthian period illustrate a strong continuity of traditions, and that the most important deities of old Assyria were still worshipped at Assur more than 800 years after the Assyrian Empire had been destroyed.

Religious practices at the nearby Nineveh during Parthian times differed considerably from those at Assur. Whereas the deities worshipped at Assur were mostly old Mesopotamian ones (other than Heracles-Nergal), the deities worshipped at Nineveh were nearly all syncretistic or outright imported figures. These figures included the syncretistic Apollo-Nabu, Heracles-Gad, and Zeus-Bel, as well as the imported Greek god Hermes and the imported Egyptian deities Isis and Serapis.

It is not clear when exactly the Assyrians were first Christianized, but Arbela was an important early Christian center. According to the later Chronicle of Arbela, Arbela became the seat of a bishop already in AD 100, but the reliability of this document is questioned among scholars. It is however known that both Arbela and Kirkuk later served as important Christian centers in the Sasanian and later Islamic periods. From the 3rd century onwards, it is clear that Christianity was becoming the major religion of the region, with the Christian god replacing the old Mesopotamian deities, including Ashur, who had just previously experienced a remarkable period of revival. The ancient Mesopotamian religion persisted in some places for much longer, such as at Harran until at least the 10th century (the "Sabians" of Harran) and at Mardin until as late as the 18th century (the Shamsīyah).

== See also ==
- History of Mesopotamia
- List of Mesopotamian dynasties
