= Eastern Assyrian =

Eastern Assyrian may refer to:

- someone or something related to eastern regions of Assyria, in historical or geographical sense
- someone or something related to Eastern Assyrians, in the context of modern Assyrian terminology
- someone or something related to Eastern Assyrian dialects (in modern Assyrian terminology).

== See also ==
- Assyria (disambiguation)
- Assyrian (disambiguation)
- Western Assyrian (disambiguation)
- Assyrian language (disambiguation)
