= Assyrian Apostolic Church =

Assyrian Apostolic Church may refer to:

- Assyrian Apostolic Church of the East, an Eastern Christian denomination of the East Syriac Rite
- Assyrian Jacobite Apostolic Church, former name for parishes of the Syriac Orthodox Church in the USA

== See also ==
- Assyrian Church (disambiguation)
- Assyrian (disambiguation)
