= List of kings of Adiabene =

King of Adiabene
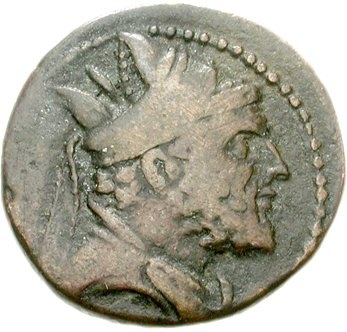
- First to rule Abdissares; 2nd century BC

Details
- First monarch: Abdissares
- Last monarch: Ardashir II
- Formed: 2nd century BC
- Abolished: AD 379

The kings of Adiabene were the rulers of Adiabene, an ancient kingdom which existed in Northern Mesopotamia from the second century BC to the fourth century AD. Adiabene was successively a vassal state of the Seleucid (second century BC), Parthian (second century BC to third century AD) and Sasanian (third to fourth century AD) empires and was geopolitically important since it often found itself located on the frontier between the Iranian empires in the east and the Roman Empire in the west. Though at times equated with ancient Assyria by contemporary authors, the only known ruler of Adiabene of apparent local Mesopotamian descent was the kingdom's first ruler, Abdissares, whose name was of Aramaic origin. The names of the later known kings of Adiabene all appear to be of either Iranian, or in a few cases Greek, origin.

== List of kings ==
The sequence of kings of Adiabene is known only fragmentarily; breaks where there are no known rulers are marked with horizontal bars in the tables below.

=== Under the Seleucids and Parthians ===
Historical ruler whose name is unknown
Possible ruler, though not attested/confirmed in contemporary or near-contemporary sources

Portrait	Name	Reign	Notes	Ref
	Abdissares	First half of the 2nd century BC	Presumably the first king of Adiabene, believed to have been a vassal of the Seleucid Empire who claimed royal power as Seleucid dominion collapsed in Mesopotamia. Known only from coinage, Abdissares was previously misidentified as a ruler of the nearby kingdoms of Sophene or Armenia. The name Abdissares is of Aramaic origin and means "servant of Ishtar".	
	Unknown king	First half of the 1st century BC (fl. 69 BC)	An unknown king of Adiabene is attested as an ally of the Armenian king Tigranes the Great at the Battle of Tigranocerta in 69 BC	
	Artaxares	Second half of the 1st century BC	Mentioned in the Res Gestae Divi Augusti among various deposed eastern rulers who met with the Roman emperor Augustus. Because of this and the timespans involved, it can be conjectured that Artaxares might have been deposed by the Parthian king Phraates IV in the 30s BC. Most of the rulers of Adiabene from at least Artaxares's time onwards had names of Iranian origin. (Note: The name Izates, for instance, used by at least two kings of Adiabene, is probably the same name as the common Iranian *yazata.)	
	Izates I	c. 30 – c. 5 BC	Probably the direct successor of Artaxares, coming to power due to his deposition. Known only from the writings of Josephus, who identified Izates I as the father of Monobaz I and Helena of Adiabene.	
	Monobaz I Bazaios	c. 5 BC – c. AD 30	Son of Izates I. The earliest king of Adiabene who is known from more than one source, known from both the writings of Josephus and his own coinage. According to Josephus, Monobaz I installed his son and eventual successor Izates II as ruler of Corduene, illustrating that Adiabene was relatively powerful at this time.	
	Izates II	c. 30 – c. 55	Son of Monobaz I. Fostered during his youth in Characene, where he converted to Judaism. According to Josephus, Izates helped the deposed Parthian king Artabanus II to return to the throne, but this account fits poorly with the known historical events of Izates's time. Gained control of Nisibis and the surrounding region, possibly through being granted it by the Parthians.	
	Monobaz II	Second half of the 1st century (fl. 55–70)	Son of Monobaz I and elder brother of Izates II. Also converted to Judaism, following his brother's example. Prominently partook in the Roman–Parthian War of 58–63.	
	Monobaz III (?)	Second half of the 1st century (?) (fl. 70–73)	Very speculatively the son and successor of Monobaz II. A figure by the name Monobaz, "kinsman of Monobaz, king of Adiabene" according to Josephus aided the Jews during the First Jewish–Roman War; due to the evident patronymy among the Adiebene rulers, he might have been Monobaz II's son and heir.	
	Meharaspes	First half of the 2nd century (fl. 114–115)	Attested as fighting the Romans during Trajan's Parthian campaign and as being militarily active in northern Mesopotamia. Defeated by the Roman emperor Trajan.	
	Raqbakt (?)	First half of the 2nd century (?) (fl. 134–136)	According to the later Chronicle of Arbela, of questioned authenticity and historical value, a ruler of Adiabene named Raqbakt converted to Christianity and aided the Parthian king Vologases III against an invasion by the Alans, 134–136	
	Unknown king (Narsai?) (Note: The king of Adiabene in the time of Septimius Severus is sometimes identified by modern historians as Narsai or Narseh, though this name comes from the later Chronicle of Arbela. The authenticity and historical value of this document is questioned by scholars. According to the chronicle, Narsai/Narseh was deposed and killed by the Parthians through being drowned in the Great Zab river, after failing to help with suppressing a rebellion.)	Second half of the 2nd century (fl. 192–194)	An unknown king of Adiabene is attested as an ally of the Roman usurper Pescennius Niger in the Year of the Five Emperors. This king is possibly depicted as a captive on some coins minted by the Roman emperor Septimius Severus, who defeated Pescennius Niger.	
	Shahrat (?)	First half of the 3rd century (?) (fl. 224)	According to the later Chronicle of Arbela, a king of Adiabene named Shahrat allied with Ardashir I, the first Sasanian king, against the Parthian Empire.	
	Atilu	First half of the 3rd century (fl. 231–237)	Known from a statue discovered in the ruins of a temple in the city of Hatra. The name inscribed on the statue, ’tlw, has been vocalized as Āṯal and ’Aṯīlū and corresponds to the common Greek name Ἄτταλος (Attalos). The presence of his statue in the capital of another kingdom attests to good relations between Adiabene and Hatra during his rule.	

=== Under the Sasanians ===
The Sasanian Empire conquered northern Mesopotamia c. 240. The Sasanians referred to Adiabene as Nōdšīragān or Nōd-Ardaxšīragān. Under Sasanian rule, the kingdom continued to exist as a vassal state, sometimes governed by Sasanian princes, for more than a century. After Ardashir II became king of the Sasanian Empire in 379, no more kings of Adiabene are attested in known sources. Later sources mention only governors of Adiabene, indicating that the kingdom was divided into a set of smaller provinces governed by royally appointed local governors.

Portrait	Name	Reign	Notes	Ref
	Ardashir I	Second half of the 3rd century (fl. 260–262)	Known from the Res Gestae Divi Saporis, an inscription by the Sasanian king Shapur I. His name was likely intentionally the same as the founder of the Sasanian Empire, Ardashir I, suggesting that he was either a Sasanian prince or a vassal ruler who assumed the prestigious name.	
	Ardashir II	c. 344 – 379	Sasanian prince, ruled as vassal king of Adiabene under his brother Shapur II. Became ruler of the Sasanian Empire in 379, whereafter Adiabene was abolished as a distinct kingdom.	
