= Assyrian script =

Assyrian script may refer to:

- Assyrian cuneiform, a writing system used during the Babylonian and Assyrian empires
- Ashuri alphabet (sometimes called the Assyrian alphabet), a traditional calligraphic form of the Hebrew alphabet
- The eastern version of the Syriac alphabet

== See also ==
- Assyrian (disambiguation)
