= Assyrian Orthodox Church =

Assyrian Orthodox Church may refer to:

- Syriac Orthodox Church, some Syriac Orthodox parishes in North America formerly and/or currently refer to themselves as Assyrian Orthodox
- Assyrian community in the Georgian Orthodox Church, dated back to the 6th century
- Assyrian community in the Russian Orthodox Church, organized in 1898
- Assyrian Church of the East, Assyrian church that follows the Gregorian Calendar
- Ancient Church of the East, Assyrian church that follows the Julian Calendar

== See also ==
- Assyrian (disambiguation)
- Assyrian Church (disambiguation)
- Orthodox Church (disambiguation)
