= Western Assyrian =

Western Assyrian may refer to:

- someone or something related to western regions of Assyria, in historical or geographical sense
- someone or something related to Western Assyrians, in the context of modern Assyrian terminology
- someone or something related to Western Assyrian dialects (in modern Assyrian terminology), including:
  - Turoyo language, a Neo-Aramaic language spoken in the Tur Abdin region, southeastern Turkey, and in northeastern Syria
  - Mlahsô language, a critically endangered Neo-Aramaic language that was spoken in southeastern Turkey and northeastern Syria
- the Western Aramaic languages, a branch of the Aramaic languages that today only exists in the form of Western Neo-Aramaic

== See also ==
- Assyria (disambiguation)
- Assyrian (disambiguation)
- Eastern Assyrian (disambiguation)
- Assyrian language (disambiguation)
