= Pkidha =

Pkidha was the first Christian bishop of Adiabene, a kingdom in northern Mesopotamia. He held the see from 104 to 114 AD. He was born as a slave of a Zoroastrian master. Tradition says that he saw the missionary Addai from Edessa raise a girl to life and gave his heart to the Lord.
