= Mar Qardagh =

Saint Qardāgh
- Born: Adiabene
- Died: 4th century Arbil, Adiabene
- Venerated in: Chaldean Catholic Church, Assyrian Church of the East, Syro-Malabar Church
- Major shrine: Church of Mār Qardāgh, Arbil, Iraq
- Feast: Friday of the 14th week after the Pentecost

Mār Qardāgh (Classical Syriac: ܣܗܕܐ ܡܪܝ ܩܪܕܓ ܐܬ݂ܘܪܝܐ), was an Assyrian prince who was martyred for converting to Christianity from Zoroastrianism.

== Life ==
Qardāgh was born to a noble family in the Sassanid Empire during the 4th century and descended from the "great race and lineage of the kingdom of the Assyrians". When Qardāgh was 25 years old, Shapur II visited his parents’ estate and was impressed with Qardāgh's handsome appearance and athleticism. Qardāgh was appointed as a governor for a large region in northern Persia, there he met Abdisho (ܥܒܕܝܫܘܥ) and converted to Christianity.

Upon returning home Qardāgh was rejected by his family and under pressure from the religious elite, Shapur sentenced him to be stoned. Qardāgh fled with a small army to the mountains where he was able to repel the Persians for months. One night Saint Stephen appeared to him and told him that it was better to give his life for his faith than to continue fighting. He surrendered to the king and it was his own father who threw the first stone.

He was buried in Arbil, Adiabene where a church holding his relics was later constructed.

== See also ==
- Mar Behnam

== Sources ==
- Payne, Richard E. (2015). A State of Mixture: Christians, Zoroastrians, and Iranian Political Culture in Late Antiquity. Univ of California Press. pp. 1–320. ISBN 9780520961531.
