= Assyrian language =

Assyrian language may refer to:

- Ancient Assyrian language, a dialect of the ancient East Semitic Akkadian language
- In modern Assyrian terminology, related to Neo-Aramaic languages:
  - Suret language, a modern West Semitic language that belongs to the Northeastern Neo-Aramaic branch
  - Turoyo language, a modern West Semitic language, part of the Central Neo-Aramaic branch

== See also ==
- Assyria (disambiguation)
- Assyrian (disambiguation)
- Eastern Assyrian (disambiguation)
- Western Assyrian (disambiguation)
- Syrian language (disambiguation)
