= Chronicle of Arbela =

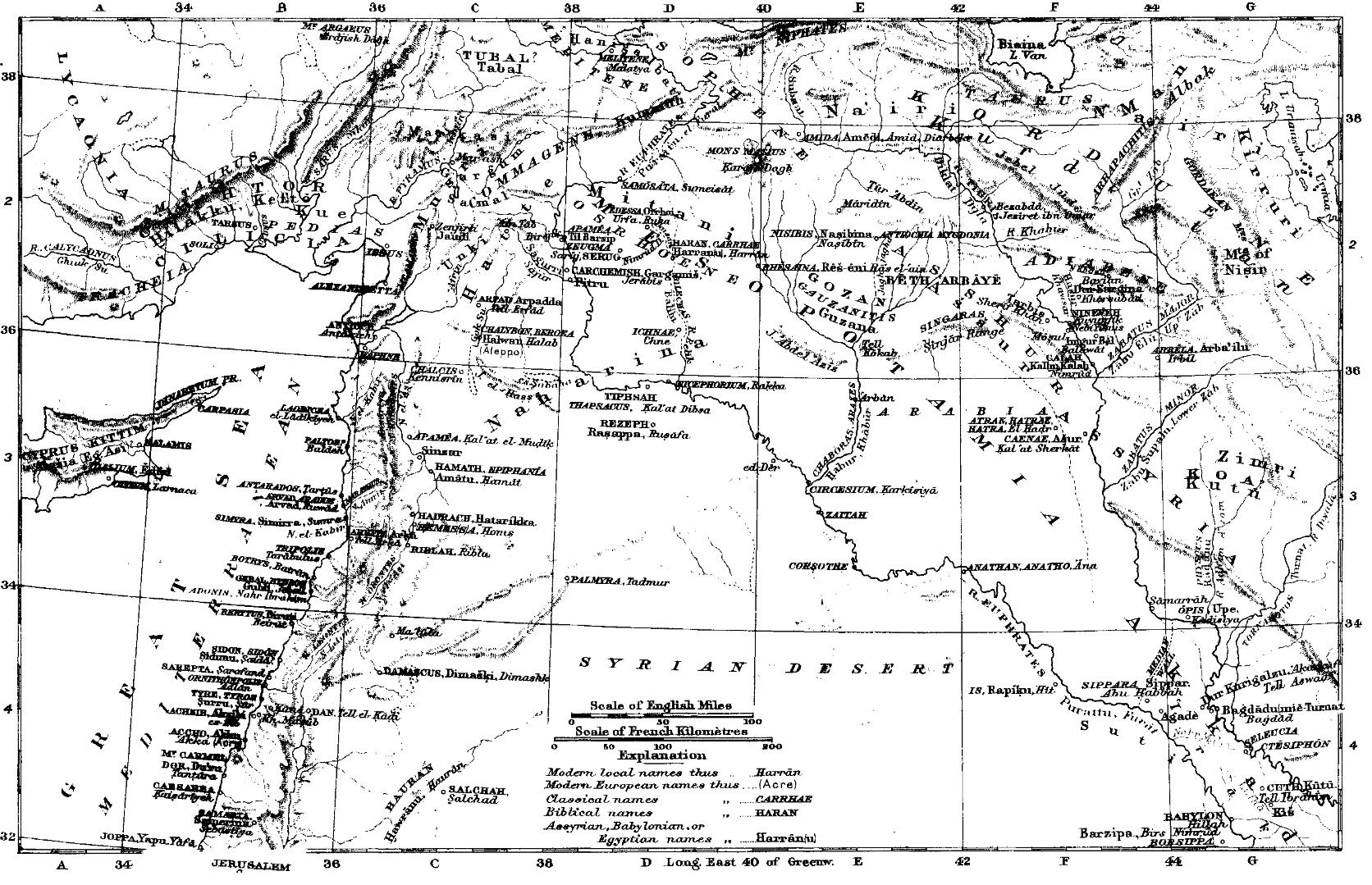
Mesopotamia-Map showing location of Adiabene, upper right, 2F

The Chronicle of Arbela claims to record the early history of Christianity in Arbela (modern Erbil of northern Iraq), then the capital of Adiabene, from the early second century to the mid-sixth century. It appears to date to the sixth century, though its age and historicity have been disputed. Today, the majority of specialists consider the work to be a modern forgery.

== Narrative ==
The Chronicle of Arbela relates the history of the Assyrian Church of the East in Adiabene, a Neo-Assyrian "northern Mesopotamian province located between the two Zab rivers" in what is modern Iraq. Arbela was an "important junction point on major east-west and north-south caravan routes, and has been an occupied site since remote antiquity."

A short devotional introduction describes the work as a history, in the form of a letter to one Pinhes, chronicling the history of all the Eastern Rite bishops of Adiabene, and its martyrs. According to the Chronicle, the first bishop of Adiabene was Peqida, who was ordained near the beginning of the second century AD by Addai the Apostle. The second bishop was Shemshon, who preached to participants of the festival Shahrabgamud, which included human sacrifice, and converted many to Christianity. Next was Ishaq, who was aided by Raqbakt, the governor of Adiabene, who opposed the "heathens" and contributed to the spread of Christianity into the countryside.

The fourth bishop, serving in the mid-second century, was Abraham I, who saved the Assyrian Christians during a war in which they were attacked by Zoroastrians. By performing miracles, he pacified the Zoroastrian attackers. His successor, Bishop Noh, continued to suffer from persecution at the hands of the Zoroastrians, but also managed to spread Christianity in neighboring regions, in part through a miracle in which he raised a dead boy to life, and through another miracle in which he caused a tree to disappear.

After a four-year vacancy of the bishopric due to persecution, a bishop by the name of Habel was appointed, who was diplomatic and improved relations between the Christians and Zoroastrians. In his days, Parthian king Vologases IV fought against and defeated both Roman and Persian armies, and his victory was credited by the author of the Chronicle to God.

Around the beginning of the third century, he was succeeded by Ebed Meshiha, who oversaw a peaceful thirty-five years. The next bishop, Hairan (bishop 217-250), oversaw Arbela during the end of the Parthian empire, at which time Arbela was incorporated into the Sasanian Empire as part of Asoristan. Unlike the Romans, or the Sasanians which followed Persia, Christianity was somewhat more tolerated by Persians and spread accordingly.

== History ==
=== Period history ===
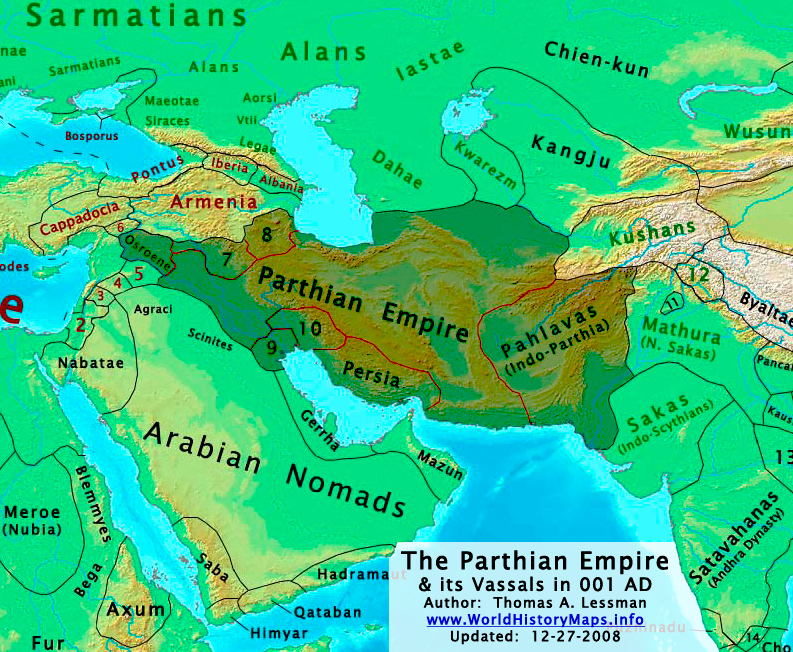
Parthian Empire 1 AD

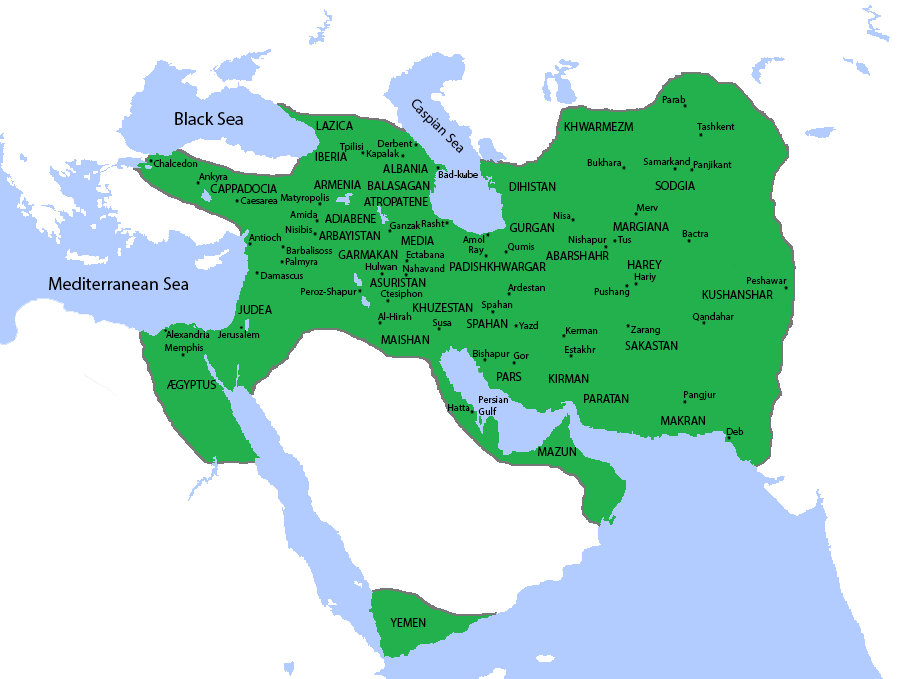
Sassanian Empire 620 AD showing Adiabene to the East of Antioch

Allegedly written in the 6th century in classical Syriac the chronicle takes the form of a liber pontificalis. "Mĕšīḥā-Zĕḵā drew primarily on ... Habel the Teacher, whose reports reveal that Christianity had spread east of the Tigris, in Adiabene, before 100... The Chronicle ends during the term of the patriarch Mār Āḇā of Seleucia-Ctesiphon (540–552)." The historical accuracy of the chronicle is disputed.

"By the time of Trajan's invasion of Adiabene in 115 or 116 AD, the satrapy had been ruled by a Jewish dynasty for more than 75 years. According to the Chronicle of Arbela, Christianity firmly rooted itself in Adiabene in Trajan's time. This tradition has been rejected by several historians, most notably F. C. Burkitt." Burkitt says a Syriac speaking version of Christianity was in Adiabene and there were bishops in Arbela before the collapse of the Parthian empire, but after the conversion of Abghar in Edessa around 200. Tertullian and others confirm there were Christians in Persia before the Sassanians [in 224] but give no indication how long they might have been there.

Burkitt is contradicted by other information. Eusebius, in HE 1.13.1-22 and HE 2.1.6-7 writing before 324 AD, records from a Syriac source that Thomas sent Thaddaeus (in Syriac 'Addai') "one of the seventy disciples" to preach in Edessa. Others dismiss this claim and argue for Tatian as the founder of the church in Persia. "Samuel Hugh Moffett, under the title "Tatian the Assyrian," writes that the first verifiable historical evidence of Christianity is provided by the life and work of Tatian (c. 110–180 AD) after the middle of the second century." "Whatever conclusions we draw from these and other traditions", not only is there "firm evidence for the existence of Christians in the area by AD 170", there is also "extensive evidence for the movement of Christianity eastwards, in the earliest centuries, from bases in Arbela in Adiabene and Edessa in Osrhoene."

"The Chronicle assumes Christianity reached the satrapy [of Adiabene] by 100 AD, and Eduard Sachau considers the tradition sound." According to Luke's account in Acts 2:9, those who responded first at Pentecost were 'Parthians and Medes and Elamites and residents of Mesopotamia'." Tradition also says many "fled eastwards after the destruction of Jerusalem in 70 AD". "One of the first Aramaic-speaking Christian centers might have been Adiabene...where the local ruling house had converted to Judaism in about 40 AD. This Jewish city-state had regular contacts with Palestine, and it seems possible that through this route Christianity reached Adiabene as early as the first century." With Adiabene as a possible refuge from persecution elsewhere, the number of Christians grew markedly "so that by AD 235 they had more than 20 Bishops and some 18 dioceses."

After the conversion of King Abgar VIII (r. 179–212) of Edessa, the Aramaic language (later called Classical Syriac) spread and became the lingua franca for a wide variety of Aramaic speakers. "The revitalization of Zoroastrianism under the Sassanid rulers [in the third century] brought with it a revitalization of the [historic] Pahlavi language of the Persians as well." Whereas the church's established status facilitated their continued use of Syriac instead of Pahlavi." "The Syrian churches of today all trace back their origin to the Christian communities that developed in Syria and Mesopotamia in the second and third centuries, especially to those that in this period used some variety of Aramaic rather than Greek as their primary language."

From 53 BC to about 215 AD, the "two super-powers" Rome and Persia repeatedly "engaged each other in a vicious cycle of invasions and counterattacks". "Throughout the third century, the border zone between the Romans and the Sassanids remained a region of conflict. Cities passed back and forth between the two powers, affecting the churches within them." "The Syriac [Christian] churches straddled the Late East Roman and Early Byzantine empires, as well as the Parthian and Sassanian empires (in Persia). The Syriac Christian tradition thus found itself in two opposing worlds, [west and east] both of which it needed to accommodate, and both of which would sporadically and violently persecute it."

In 224–226 AD, Parthian rulers of the Persian empire that embraced Adiabene and Arbela, fell to a coalition force of southern Medes and Persians, with the collaboration of Adiabene. This was the beginning of Sassanid empire. The new ruler assumed the title of "Shah of Shahs" and vigorously began defending the state religion, Zoroastrianism. The next generation saw "an imperial revival of the Zoroastrian faith among the Sassanids that eventually brought about brutal persecution of Christians in the Persian empire." "It is impossible to estimate the numbers [of Christians in the Persian empire by this time] but we know that they formed a substantial minority of the population and on the whole were well educated and famous for their skills in medicine and the sciences."

In 258 AD, Shapur the First pushed west, besieged Edessa, captured emperor Valerian and vast numbers of prisoners were brought into Persia. Many of these were Christians. "The first figure of the Christian church who emerges clearly is Papa who became Bishop of Seleucia-Ctesiphon around 300 AD. The Chronicle references Papa and from Papa onward there is good support for the historicity of the text. On Good Friday, April 17, 341, Shapur the second had 100 Christians put to death beginning a persecution lasting nearly forty years without remission, calling them "traitors who shared sentiments with Caesar." "The persecution was reported to be very fierce between AD 344 and 367 in Susiana and Adiabene with some 16,000 names listed as martyrs, which points to an even larger number of victims." By the late fourth century, Christianity is recognized as a legitimate minority with a decree of toleration from Yazdgard I. Some persecution returns under Bahram V. and in "AD 422 a new treaty is signed between Persia and the Roman Empire which guaranteed freedom of worship to Christians in Persia."

=== Article history ===
There was little interest in the history of Christianity in Iraq before 1840 when it was stimulated by news of massacres in the highlands above Arbela. "Copies of Syriac manuscripts recovered from the churches and monasteries of northern Iraq and southeastern Anatolia, gradually filtered into Europe, where they supplemented collections acquired from Egypt and Syria. Publications based on these East-Syrian manuscripts between circa 1880 and 1910 ... preserved dozens of previously unknown Syriac texts."

The Chronicle of Arbela was first published in 1907 by the theologian Alphonse Mingana. It is alleged to have been written in the sixth century. The Chronicle "provides more detailed information about the early history of the church of the East than any other literary source". It was used by a "whole generation of scholars" until 1925, when some scholars in Syriac literature first began raising questions about its historical reliability. Literary historian Paul Peeters questioned the text's authenticity and reliability and called for a re-examination in 1936. In 1967, a "scathing critique" by Church historian Jean-Maurice Fiey challenged the Chronicle's reliability as a historical source. In 1995, the historian Erich Kettenhofen defended the possibility the Chronicle is a medieval compilation. In 2006, historian Joel Walker asserted forgery by Alphonse Mingana.

In 1959, social scientist Paul Kahle wrote a book supporting the authenticity of the Chronicle, saying that Christianity reached Adiabene at an earlier date than previously thought due to the conversion of the Jewish ruling family. He concludes, "similarities with the Edessene Abgar (c. 200 AD) are the result of that legend having its origins in Arbela and was only adapted to Edessa at a later date." Other scholars who have supported the (at least partial) authenticity and historical credibility of the Chronicle include Carl Eduard Sachau, orientalist (1915), Adolf von Harnack, theologian and historian (1924), and Sebastian Paul Brock, scholar in Syriac languages (1967 and 1992) who also says the account of the early spread of Christianity in the Parthian period cannot have any historical basis. Historian Peter Kawerau wrote in 1985 and 1991 that authenticity is confirmed by "the bi-lingual inscription at Bīšāpūr and by the mention in the text of a solar eclipse that occurred on 10 July 218". Professor of Iranian Studies Marie Louise Chaumont (1988), among many others, support the text as having historical credibility.

== Authorship ==
The Chronicle of Arbela was "first published by Alphonse Mingana in 1907." He attributed it to a "little known church historian of the sixth century," 'Mšīhā-Zkā' "(a compound East-Syrian name meaning 'Christ has conquered')". Historian Joel Walker has asserted the author of the text was Mingana himself based on his knowledge of Mar Qadagh. Kettenhofen says the author was most likely a medieval author working from a pool of narrative traditions that contributed to all three heroes in both the text of Arbella and Qardagh. Christelle and Florence Jullien, "while conceding Mingana's manipulation of the text, have vigorously defended the Chronicle as a legitimate East-Syrian source" that reflects an "early documentary core" and a Syrian author.

== Thematic connections ==
The Chronicle includes the stories of two key characters: "Gufrašnasp the mohapat of Adiabene" in third-century Greater Iran during the rule of the Sasanian emperor, Bahram II (c. 274–291 AD), and Raqbakt, a ruler with an unspecified leadership position in Adiabene. Their combined careers resemble the historical figure of Mar Qardagh, a Sasanian marzban (guard) of Upper Mesopotamia, who became a Christian martyr c. 360 during Shapur II's large-scale persecution of Christians. The "History of Mar Qardagh" and the Chronicle of Arbela have thematic connections through these characters.

Some of the similarities between Arbela and Qardagh are: Raqbakt had a public office such as viceroy, possibly a governor, as did Mar Qardagh. They both converted to Christianity, led an army of foot soldiers to protect the land, and served their king through many military victories. "He (Rakbakt) was fatally wounded by a spear thrust into his side and 'gave up his spirit like Judas Maccabee'." "The echoes are closer still in the case of Gufrašnasp, whom the Chronicle depicts as a pious Magian, who revolts against the Persian King of kings and defends his fortress in Adiabene by heroic archery. Although neither Rakbakt nor Gufrašnasp provide an exact model for Qardagh, their combined careers contain many of the central features of the Qardagh legend."
