= Assyrian Church =

Assyrian Church may refer to:

- Chaldean Catholic Church, an Eastern Christian church founded by and composed of ethnic Assyrians entered into communion with Rome
- Assyrian Church of the East, an Eastern Christian church
- Ancient Church of the East, an Eastern Christian denomination founded in 1968
- Syriac Orthodox Church, an Eastern Christian church
- Syriac Catholic Church, an Eastern Christian church
- Assyrian Evangelical Church, a Presbyterian church in the Middle East
- Assyrian Pentecostal Church, a Reformed Eastern Christian denomination
- Russian Ecclesiastical Mission in Urmia, a Russian Orthodox mission to ethnic Assyrians

== See also ==
- Assyrian (disambiguation)
- Assyrian Orthodox Church (disambiguation)
- Syriac Christianity
