= Meharaspes =

2nd century Parthian client king of Adiabene

Meharaspes, also written as Mebarsapes or Mehrasp, was the Parthian client king of Adiabene in the early 2nd century CE; he was also the last king of an independent Adiabene. He was defeated by Trajan in 116; Adiabene was incorporated into the short-lived Roman province of Mesopotamia.

== Defeat by Trajan ==
Mebarsapes' stronghold was in Adenystrae (suggested as medieval Kızıltepe, though geographically unlikely given the position of the Tigris) and was besieged by Trajan's forces. Within the city was a Roman centurion named Sentius, sent by Trajan as an envoy, who had been jailed by Mebarsapes following his failed diplomatic mission. Sentius convinced his fellow prisoners to aide in his escape; together, they killed the commander of the stronghold and opened the gates for the besieging Romans, ending what would have otherwise been a lengthy campaign. The fall of Adenystrae was the final blow for Meharaspes, losing his kingdom. Following the defeat of Adiabene with a single division, a second Roman column continued, unopposed, down the Tigris to the ruins of the city of Babylon.
