= Abdissares =

2nd-century BC king of Adiabene

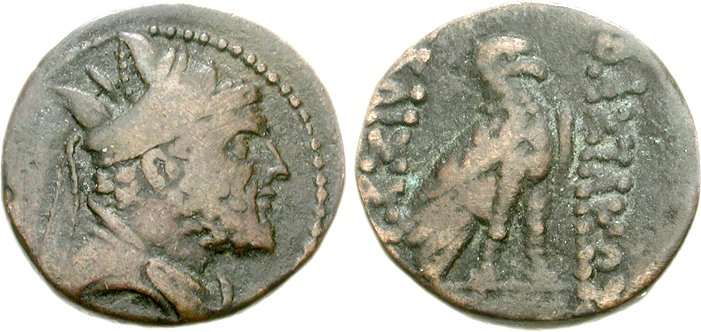
Coin of Abdissares

Abdissares (also spelled Abdissar) was the first king of Adiabene, ruling sometime in the first half of the 2nd-century BC. Scholarship initially considered him to be the ruler of Sophene, due to stylistic similarities between his coins and the ones in Commagene and Sophene. However, this has now been debunked. It has now been established that Abdissares' name—contrary to the Sophenian kings—was not of Iranian origin, but of Semitic, meaning "servant of Ishtar," a name primarily used by Semitic inhabitants. The goddess Ishtar enjoyed great popularity in the heartland of ancient Assyria, where Adiabene was located.

Moreover, it has also been discovered that Abdissares used the Greek epithet [Α]ΔΑΙΑΒΗΝΟΥ ("of Adiabene") on his coins (which are to be dated c. 164 BC). Adding geographical or ethnographical (or political) terms on Hellenistic coin engravings was uncommon. The modern historian de Callataÿ has suggested that Abdissares may have added this epithet to highlight his royal rights to Adiabene in the midst of facing geopolitical challenges. According to Maciej Grabowski, Abdissares used the epithet to promulgate the establishment of the Kingdom of Adiabene. It has been surmised that Abdissares rose to kingship as a result of the disintegration of Greek Seleucid rule in the Near East. During this period, many local rulers took advantage of the Seleucid weakness to form their own kingdoms, such as Armenia, Sophene, Gordyene and Commagene.

On the obverse of Abdissares' coins, a portrait of him is displayed, wearing the same tiara worn by the satraps of Achaemenid era. The same type of tiara is worn by a king portrayed on the Batas-Herir rock relief in northern Iraq, which has led to the suggestion that the rock relief is a depiction of Abdissares. The reverse of Abdissares' coins depicts an eagle. An identical headgear is portrayed on the coinage of the Sophenian king Xerxes (fl. 212 BC) and Baydad (r. 164–146 BC), the ruler of Persis.

The next known person to rule Adiabene after Abdissares was an unnamed king, who was an ally of the Artaxiad Armenian king Tigranes the Great (r. 95–55 BC) during the Battle of Tigranocerta in 69 BC.

== Sources ==
- Marciak, Michał; Wójcikowski, R. (2016). "Images of Kings of Adiabene: Numismatic and Sculptural Evidence". Iraq. IX. Cambridge University Press: 79–101. doi:10.1017/irq.2016.8.
- Marciak, Michał (2017). Sophene, Gordyene, and Adiabene: Three Regna Minora of Northern Mesopotamia Between East and West. BRILL. ISBN 9789004350724.
- Grabowski, Maciej (2011). "Abdissares of Adiabene and the Batas-Herir relief". Warszawa. IX: 117–140.
