= Adiabene =

Kingdom in northern Mesopotamia (c. 164 BC – c. 379 AD)

- c. 164 BC–c. 379 AD
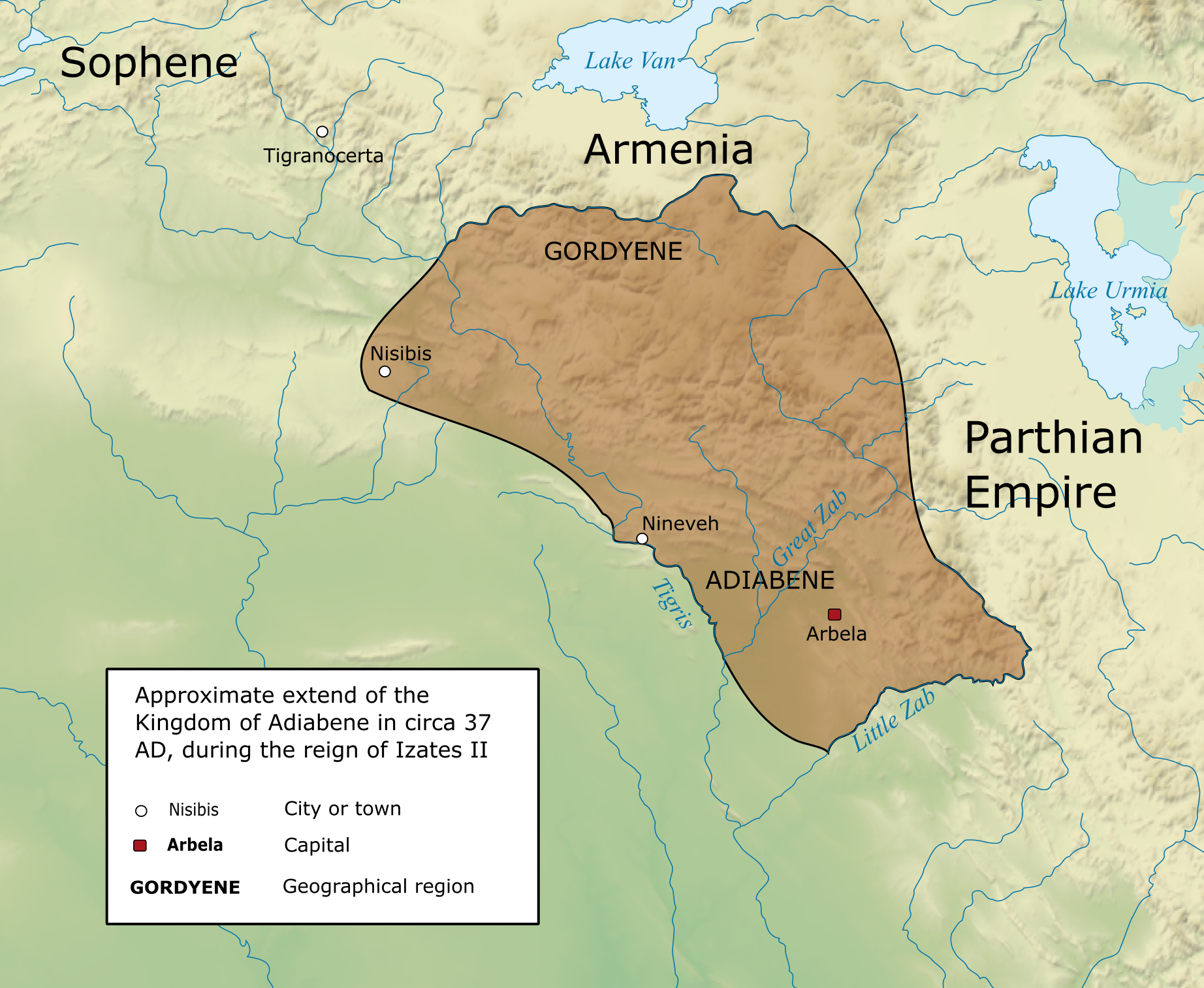
- The Kingdom of Adiabene in c. 37 AD at its greatest extent, during the reign of Izates II
- Status: Vassal of the Parthian Empire (145 BC – 224 AD); Vassal of the Sasanian Empire (224–379)
- Capital: Arbela
- Common languages: Classical Syriac
- Religion: Ashurism, Judaism, Zoroastrianism, Christianity, Manichaeism
- Government: Monarchy
- King
  - around 164 BC: Abdissares
  - around 15 CE: Izates I
  - 20s? – c. 36: Monobaz I
  - c. 36 – c. 55/59 AD: Izates II
  - c. 55/59 AD – late 60s/mid-70s: - - - - - - - - - - -: Monobaz II
  - ? – 116: Meharaspes
- Historical era: Antiquity
  - Established: c. 164 BC
  - Transformed into a Sasanian province: c. 379 AD
Preceded by	Succeeded by
Parthian Empire	Roman Empire; Sasanian Empire
- Today part of: Iraq; Turkey

Adiabene (Greek: Ἀδιαβηνή, Classical Syriac: ܚܕܝܐܒ) was an ancient kingdom in northern Mesopotamia, corresponding to the heartland of ancient Assyria. The size of the kingdom varied over time; initially encompassing an area between the Zab Rivers, it eventually gained control of Nineveh and starting at least with the rule of Monobazos I (late 1st-century BCE), Gordyene became an Adiabenian dependency. It reached its zenith under Izates II, who was granted the district of Nisibis by the Parthian king Artabanus II (r. 12–40) as a reward for helping him regain his throne. Adiabene's eastern borders stopped at the Zagros Mountains, adjacent to the region of Media. Arbela served as the capital of Adiabene.

The formation of the kingdom is obscure. The first instance of a recorded Adiabenian ruler is in 69 BCE, when an unnamed king of Adiabene participated in the battle of Tigranocerta as an ally of the Armenian king Tigranes the Great (r. 95–55 BCE). However, coinage implies the establishment of a kingdom in Adiabene around 164 BCE, following the disintegration of Greek Seleucid rule in the Near East. Adiabene was conquered by the Parthian king Mithridates I (r. 171–132 BCE) between 145 and 141 BCE, and served at least from the reign of Mithridates II (r. 124–91 BCE) as an integral part of the Parthian realm.

Adiabenian rulers converted to Judaism from paganism in the 1st century CE. Queen Helena of Adiabene (known in Jewish sources as Heleni HaMalka, meaning Helene the Queen) moved to Jerusalem, where she built palaces for herself and her sons, Izates bar Monobaz and Monobaz II at the northern part of the city of David, south of the Temple Mount. Monobaz II sent help to aid the Jews during the Great Jewish Revolt against the Romans. According to the Talmud, both Helena and Monobaz donated large funds for the Temple of Jerusalem. After 115 CE, there are no historic traces of Jewish royalty in Adiabene.

The Parthians were overthrown by the Sasanian Empire in 224, who by the time of Shapur I (r. 240–270) had established their rule in Adiabene. Ardashir II is the last figure to be recorded as king of Adiabene, which implies that the kingdom was after his tenure in c. 379 transformed into a province (shahr), governed by a non-royal delegate (marzban or shahrab) of the Sasanian king.

== Etymology ==
The name of the state entered English from the Ancient Greek Ἀδιαβηνή, which was derived from ܚܕܝܐܒ, Ḥaḏy’aḇ or Ḥḏay’aḇ, in Syriac. The state was also known as Nōdšīragān or Nōd-Ardaxšīragān in Middle Persian, Նոր Շիրական, Nor Shirakan, in Armenian, and חַדְיָב, Ḥaḏyāḇ, in Hebrew.

== Location ==
Adiabene occupied a district in Median Empire between the Upper Zab (Lycus) and the Lower Zab (Caprus), though Ammianus Marcellinus speaks of Nineveh, Ecbatana, and Gaugamela as also belonging to it. By the late 1st century CE, its borders extended as far as Nisibis. (Note: Nisibis was not part of Adiabene before 36, when Artabanus presented the city to Izates as a reward for his loyalty. Strabo implies that Nisibis was not part of Adiabene, while Pliny reports that Nisibis and Alexandria were chief cities of Adiabene. On the remnants of the ten tribes in the Khabur area, see Emil Schiirer, The Jewish People in the Time of Jesus Christ, II, ii, pp. 223-25; Avraham Ben-Yaakov, Jewish Communities of Kurdistan, [in Hebrew] (Jerusalem, 1961), pp. 9-11; Neusner, Jacob (1964). "The Conversion of Adiabene to Judaism: A New Perspective". Journal of Biblical Literature. 83 (1): 60–66. doi:10.2307/3264908. JSTOR 3264908.) In the Talmudic writings the name occurs as חדייב ,חדייף and הדייב. Its chief city was Arbela (Arba-ilu), where Mar Uqba had a school, or the neighboring Hazzah, by which name the later Arabs also called Arbela.

In Kiddushin 72a the Biblical Habor is identified with Adiabene, but in Jerusalem Talmud, Megillah i. 71b with Riphath. In the Targum Jonathan on Jeremiah li. 27, Ararat, Minni, and Ashkenaz are paraphrased by Kordu, Harmini, and Hadayab, i.e., Corduene, Armenia, and Adiabene; while in Ezekiel xxvii. 23 Harran, Caneh, and Eden are interpreted by the Jewish Babylonian Aramaic translator as "Harwan, Nisibis, and Adiabene."

== Population ==
Adiabene had a mixed population of Assyrians, Arabs, Arameans, Greeks, Iranians, and Jews. Adiabene was a major-speaking Syriac language kingdom. According to Pliny, four tribes inhabited the region of Adiabene: Orontes, Alani, Azones and Silices. The account of Josephus' Antiquities of the Jews shows that there was a substantial Jewish population in the kingdom. The difficult mixing of cultures can be seen in the story of the martyrdom of Mahanuš, a prominent Iranian Zoroastrian who converted to Christianity. In later times Adiabene became an archbishopric, with the seat of the metropolitan at Arbela.

The first known king of Adiabene was Abdissar who is known to scholarship only through his coinage, his Semitic name, meaning "the servant of Ishtar," suggests that he was of local Assyrian origin. Based on the names of some Adiabenian rulers, Ernst Herzfeld suggested a Sakan or Scythian origin for the royal house of the kingdom; however, later progress in Iranian linguistic studies showed that these names were common west middle Iranian names. It has been suggested that the royal house of Adiabene, after fleeing Trajan's invasion, established the later Amatuni dynasty which ruled the area between the lakes Urmia and Van.

Adiabene was a district in Mesopotamia between upper and lower Zab and was a part of the Neo-Assyrian Empire and inhabited by Assyrians even after the fall of Nineveh. It was an integral part of Asoristan (Achaemenid and Sasanian Assyria). The region was later made a part of the Roman province of Assyria after the invasion by Trajan in 116.

According to Patricia Crone and Michael Cook, when the heartland of Assyria was back into focus in early Christianity (during the Parthian era and about six centuries after the fall of the Assyrian Empire), "it was with an Assyrian, not a Persian let alone Greek, self-identification: the temple of Ashur was restored, the city was rebuilt, and an Assyrian successor state that returned in the shape of the client kingdom of Adiabene." The Jewish historian Flavius Josephus states that the inhabitants of Adiabene were Assyrians.

Through an examination of Syriac source work, it can be seen that the population of Adiabene was Syriac speaking and of local Assyrian origin. Despite this, Adiabene's elites were integrated with values of Zoroastrian social life through Sasanian culture. It can be assumed that many local Semitic cults succumbed to state supported Zoroastrianism during this period. This development can be seen Legend of Mar Qardagh, where the main protagonist is portrayed as being of Assyrian royal descent, yet a follower of the Zoroastrian faith prior to his conversion to Christianity.

== History ==
=== Achaemenid Persian Empire ===
Under the Achaemenid Persian kings, Adiabene seems for a time to have been a vassal state of the Persian Empire. The Ten Thousand, an army of Greek mercenaries, retreated through Adiabene on their march to the Black Sea after the Battle of Cunaxa.

=== Queen Helena's conversion to Judaism ===
According to Jewish tradition, Helena, the Queen of Adiabene converted to Judaism from paganism in the 1st century. Queen Helena of Adiabene (known in Jewish sources as Heleni HaMalka) moved to Jerusalem where she built palaces for herself and her sons, Izates bar Monobaz and Monobaz II at the northern part of the city of David, south of the Temple Mount, and aided Jews in their war with Rome. Queen Helena's sarcophagus was discovered in 1863. A pair of inscriptions on the sarcophagus, "tzaddan malka" and "tzadda malkata," is believed to be a reference to the provisions (tzeda in Hebrew) that Helena supplied to Jerusalem's poor and to the Jewish kingdom in general. According to Josephus, the queen converted to Judaism together with her son Monobaz II, under the influence of two Jews. Another tradition has it that she met a Jewish jewelry merchant in Adiabene by the name of Hananiah (Ananias) or Eliezer, who told her about the people of Israel and persuaded her to join them. All historic traces of Jewish royalty in Adiabene ended around 115 CE, but these stories made a huge impact on rabbinic literature and Talmud. Nominally Zoroastrian, the people of Adiabene were tolerant toward Judaism, and permitted the establishment of Jewish communities there. The Jews of Edessa, Nisibis, and Adiabene repaid them by being among the most vigorous opponents of Trajan. In late second century Christianity rapidly spread among Zoroastrians and those formerly professing Judaism. When Christianity became the official religion of the Roman empire under Constantine, the position of Adiabenian Christians was naturally exacerbated, since they were seen as potentially disaffected by the zealously Zoroastrian Sasanians.

=== Hellenistic period ===
The little kingdom may have had a series of native rulers nominally vassal to the Macedonian, Seleucid and later Armenian (under Tigranes the Great) empires.

Middle East in 100 AD

=== Parthian Empire ===
It later became one of the client kingdoms of the Parthian empire. During the 1st century BCE and the 1st century CE, it gained a certain prominence under a series of kings descended from Monobaz I and his son Izates I. Monobaz I is known to have been allied with king Abennerig of Characene, in whose court his son Izates II bar Monobaz lived for a time and whose daughter Symacho Izates married, as well as the rulers of other small kingdoms on the periphery of the Parthian sphere of influence.

==== Roman intermezzo (117–118) ====
The chief opponent of Trajan in Mesopotamia during the year 115 was the last king of independent Adiabene, Meharaspes. He had made common cause with Ma'nu (Mannus) of Singar (Singara). Trajan invaded Adiabene, and made it part of the Roman province of Assyria; under Hadrian in 117.

In the summer of 195 Septimius Severus was again warring in Mesopotamia, and in 196 three divisions of the Roman army fell upon Adiabene. According to Dio Cassius, Caracalla took Arbela in the year 216, and searched all the graves there, wishing to ascertain whether the Arsacid kings were buried there. Many of the ancient royal tombs were destroyed.

=== Sasanian rule ===
Despite the overthrow of the Parthians by the Sasanians in 224 CE, the feudatory dynasties remained loyal to the Parthians, and resisted Sasanian advance into Adiabene and Atropatene. Due to this, and religious differences, Adiabene was never regarded as an integral part of Iran, even though the Sasanians controlled it for several centuries.

After the Roman Empire gradually made Christianity its official religion during the fourth century, the inhabitants of Adiabene, who were primarily Assyrian Christians, sided with Christian Rome rather than the Zoroastrian Sasanians. The Byzantine Empire sent armies to the region during the Byzantine–Sasanian wars, but this did nothing to change the territorial boundaries. Adiabene remained a province of the Sasanians Empire until the Muslim conquest of Persia.

The region was recorded as Nod-Ardadkhshiragan or Nod-Ardashiragan in Sasanian period.

== Bishops ==
Between the 5th and the 14th centuries Adiabene was a metropolitan province of the Assyrian Church of the East. The Chronicle of Erbil, a purported history of Christianity in Adiabene under the Parthians and Sasanians, lists a number of early bishops of Erbil. The authenticity of the Chronicle of Erbil has been questioned, and scholars remain divided on how much credence to place in its evidence. Some of the bishops in the following list are attested in other sources, but the early bishops are probably legendary.

1. Pkidha (104–114)
2. Semsoun (120–123)
3. Isaac (135–148)
4. Abraham (148–163)
5. Noh (163–179)
6. Habel (183–190)
7. Abedhmiha (190–225)
8. Hiran of Adiabene (225–258)
9. Saloupha (258–273)
10. Ahadabuhi (273–291)
11. Sri'a (291–317)
12. Iohannon (317–346)
13. Abraham (346–347)
14. Maran-zkha (347–376)
15. Soubhaliso (376–407)
16. Daniel (407–431)
17. Rhima (431–450)
18. Abbousta (450–499)
19. Joseph (499–511)
20. Huana (511–?)

== See also ==
- Asoristan
- Assyria (Roman province)
- Osroene
- Sinharib
- Nor Shirakan
- List of Jewish states and dynasties

== Sources ==
- Kia, Mehrdad (2016). The Persian Empire: A Historical Encyclopedia. ABC-CLIO. ISBN 978-1610693912. (2 volumes)
- Frye, R. N. (1983). "The political history of Iran under the Sasanians". In Yarshater, Ehsan (ed.). The Cambridge History of Iran: The Seleucid, Parthian and Sasanian Periods. Vol. 3(1). Cambridge: Cambridge University Press. ISBN 0-521-20092-X.
- Frye, Richard Nelson (1984). The History of Ancient Iran. C.H.Beck. pp. 1–411. ISBN 9783406093975. "false."
- Grabowski, Maciej (2011). "Abdissares of Adiabene and the Batas-Herir relief". Warszawa. IX: 117–140.
- Hansman, J. F. (1986). "Arbela". Encyclopaedia Iranica, Vol. II, Fasc. 3. pp. 277–278.
- Marciak, Michał; Wójcikowski, R. (2016). "Images of Kings of Adiabene: Numismatic and Sculptural Evidence". Iraq. IX. Cambridge University Press: 79–101. doi:10.1017/irq.2016.8.
- Marciak, Michał (2017). Sophene, Gordyene, and Adiabene: Three Regna Minora of Northern Mesopotamia Between East and West. BRILL. ISBN 9789004350724.
- Maroney, Eric (2009). The Other Zions: The Lost Histories of Jewish Nations. Rowman & Littlefield. ISBN 978-1442200470.
- Sellwood, D. (1983). "Adiabene". Encyclopaedia Iranica, Vol. I, Fasc. 5. pp. 456–459.
- Brauer, E., The Jews of Kurdistan, Wayne State University Press, Detroit, 1993.
- Grayzel, Solomon, A History of the Jews, New York: Mentor, 1968.
- Gottheil, Richard. "Adiabene". Jewish Encyclopedia. Funk and Wagnalls, 1901–1906.; which cites:
  - Josephus, Jewish Antiquities xx. 2, § 4;
    - idem, Wars of the Jews. ii. 19, § 2; iv. 9, § 11; v. 2, § 2; 3, § 3; 4, § 2; 6, § 1, noting that Josephus probably got his information from Adiabenian Jews in Jerusalem (Von Gutschmid, Kleine Schriften, iii. 4).
  - Pliny the Elder, Historia Naturalis, v. 66, vi. 44 et seq.
  - Ammianus, History, xviii. 7, § 1; xxiii. 6, § 21
  - Strabo, Geography, xvi. 745 et seq.
  - Brüll, Adiabene, in Jahrbuch i. 58 et seq.
  - Grätz, Heinrich, in Monatsschrift, 1877, xxvi. 241 et seq., 289 et seq.
  - Von Gutschmid, Gesch. Irans, pp. 140 et seq.
  - Schürer, Gesch. ii. 562.
