= Assyria (disambiguation) =

Assyria was an ancient Mesopotamian civilization.

Assyria may also refer to:

- Achaemenid Assyria, a province of the Achaemenid Empire
- Assyria (Roman province), a province of the Roman Empire
- Asoristan, a province of the Sasanid Empire
- Assyrian homeland
- Assyria Township, Michigan

== See also ==
- Assyrian (disambiguation)
- Ashur (disambiguation)
