= Assyrian =

Assyrian or Assyriac may refer to:

- Assyrian people, an indigenous ethnic group of Mesopotamia.
- Assyria, a major Mesopotamian kingdom and empire.
  - Early Assyrian Period
  - Old Assyrian Period
  - Middle Assyrian Empire
  - Neo-Assyrian Empire
  - Post-imperial Assyria
- Assyrian language (disambiguation)
- Assyrian Church (disambiguation)
- SS Assyrian, several cargo ships
- The Assyrian (novel), a novel by Nicholas Guild
- The Assyrian (horse), winner of the 1883 Melbourne Cup

== See also ==
- Assyria (disambiguation)
- Syriac (disambiguation)
- Assyrian homeland, a geographic and cultural region in Northern Mesopotamia traditionally inhabited by Assyrian people
- Syriac language, a dialect of Middle Aramaic that is the minority language of Syrian Christians
- Upper Mesopotamia
- Church of the East (disambiguation)
