= Consulate General of France, Jerusalem =

Consular representation of the French Republic in the State of Palestine

Coordinates: 31.7750°N 35.2242°E

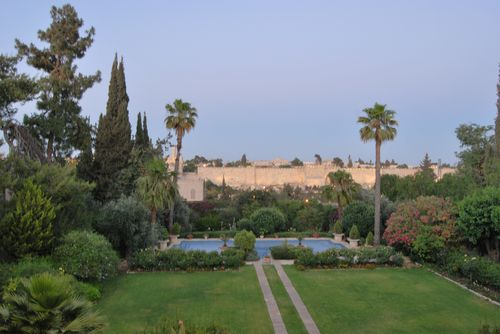
- View from the Consulate General of the walls of the Old City in Jerusalem
- Interactive map of the Consulate General of France, Jerusalem area

General information
- Status: Completed
- Type: Consulate
- Location: 5, rue, Paul Emile Botta St, Jerusalem
- Inaugurated: 1623

The consulate is located near the Old City of Jerusalem, on Paul Emile Botta Street, named after French archaeologist Paul-Émile Botta

It began its tumultuous history in the early 17th century. In 1535 the first capitulation between France and the Ottoman Empire granted France the right to appoint consuls in the cities of the Empire. The capitulations constituted the legal basis of the French protectorate over the Holy Places, Catholic Christians, and by extension, Orthodox Christians. In 1623, King Louis XIII appointed the first consul in Jerusalem "for the Glory of God and to relieve the pious pilgrims who by devotion visit the Holy Places." The presence of consuls in Jerusalem was intermittent until 1843. Amidst the growing competition between European powers over the exclusive protectorate that France was entitled to exercise over Christians, the rank of the Consul in Jerusalem was raised to that of a Consul General in 1893.

Despite the abolition of France's protectorate over the Latins and the Turkish-ruled Holy Places in 1914, the Consulate General tried to maintain and expand its influence in Palestine. Since the creation of the state of Israel in 1948, the Consulate General of France in Jerusalem has held the status of a quasi-embassy. The consulate is responsible for the area of the corpus separatum and the occupied West Bank. The consulate's districts include Jerusalem, the Gaza Strip and the West Bank. The Consulate General is independent from the Embassy of France in Tel Aviv and does not have official diplomatic relations with Israel. All contacts with the State of Israel lie exclusively within the jurisdiction of the embassy in Tel Aviv. Since its establishment in 1994, the consulate has been the French diplomatic representative to the Palestinian National Authority.

== History ==
=== Ottoman era ===
==== France's special status ====
Following the signing in 1525 of the first capitulations by Suleiman the Magnificent and Blaise de Montluc, Ambassador of King Francis I to Constantinople, France was granted the right to protect its subjects residing or trading in the Ottoman Empire, the Christian Holy Places in the Empire, particularly those in the Holy Land, and to appoint consuls in the cities of the Empire. The capitulations constituted the legal basis of the French protectorate exercised over the Holy places, Catholic Christians, and by extension over Orthodox Christians. France was then granted a special status in the Holy Land.

After an incident involving the Franciscans and the Armenians at the Church of the Nativity in Bethlehem, King Louis XIII was called upon to restore the rights of the Latins. Louis XIII sent the French diplomat Louis Deshayes de Cormenin who achieved a certain success. It was then that King Louis XIII decided to appoint a Consul in Jerusalem "for the Glory of God and to relieve the pious pilgrims whom by devotion visit the Holy places."

In accordance with the terms of the treaty, and following a series of negotiations of the French Ambassador in Constantinople, the first consul in Jerusalem was nominated in 1621 by King Louis XIII. The first Consul-General, Jean Lempereur arrived in Jerusalem in 1623. Dror Ze'evi describes in his book the circumstances of his arrival as follows :

"Bearing a royal Ottoman decree, he proceeded to the city with an impressive entourage, and finally presented his credentials to a haughty and reserved local qadi. He was allowed to reside in the Christian neighborhood, provided he would pay at some later date a sum of money promised in the decree."

But his presence was not well received by the local authorities. Jean Lempereur was later detained and deported to Damascus. He had to pay a large ransom to be released by his captor. His successors were equally ill-received, and their presence in Jerusalem became short and sporadic. For example, Jean Lempereur was consul for four years (1621–1625), and later replaced by Sébastien de Brémond (1699–1700) and by Jean de Blacas (1713–1714).

==== A disputed status ====
The nineteenth century was marked by European powers' growing and conflicting interests in the Levant. The United Kingdom, Russia, Prussia, along with other European countries, tried to expand their influence by extending their control over religious communities. As a result, France's protectorate over Christians became contested and rivaled. For example, in 1841, an Anglican Bishop was nominated in Jerusalem, which was considered to be a diplomatic victory for Britain and Prussia. In 1847, the first Russian Ecclesiastical Mission, headed by Archimandrite Porphyrius Ouspensky, who later became Bishop, was sent to Jerusalem. Otherwise, European powers came to be represented by Consuls in Palestine. The appointment of a British consul in 1838 was followed by the appointment of a consul of Prussia and of Sardinia in 1843, and by the appointment of an Austrian consul in 1849 and of a Spanish consul in 1854. Alphonse d'Alonzo, former attaché to the Consulate General of France in Jerusalem, wrote in 1901 that the Russian and the French Consuls were "irreconcilable rivals".

Amidst this growing competition between European powers, the Consul of France, Count Gabriel de Lantigny, decided to create Brothers of Christians schools and entrusted them to a Catholic congregation, known as the Lazarists. Later, when a Latin Patriarch of Jerusalem was re-established in 1847, despite France's prior reluctance to the appointment of Giuseppe Valerga as a Patriarch (mostly because he was a citizen of the rival Kingdom of Sardinia and the Grand Master of the Order of the Holy Sepulchre, a Franciscan Order), the Consul General of France Helouis-Jorelle recognized Giuseppe Valerga's high distinction when he arrived in Jerusalem on January 17, 1848. The replacement of Helouis Jorelle by Emile Botta on November 1, 1848, marked the beginning of a period of collaboration between the newly appointed Consul and the Patriarch.

To maintain the primacy of the French representative in Palestine, his rank was raised to that of a Consul General in 1893.

France's special status in the Holy Land and protectorate over the Catholics of Latin rite were internationally recognized in the Congress of Berlin in 1878. It was then officially recognized by the Holy See in 1888. In addition, through the Agreements of Mytilene and Constantinople, tax and custom privileges were notably granted to religious communities placed under the protection of France, thus enabling it to confirm its protectorate.

=== British Mandate ===
==== End of the Protectorate over the 'Latin' Christians ====
With the end of the Ottoman Empire, the Consulate General of France in Jerusalem ceased to be placed under the authority of the embassy in Constantinople. Following the San Remo conference and the establishment of the British Mandate for Palestine, France lost its protectorate over the Holy Land, and the prerogatives of the Consul General were subsequently reduced. Catherine Niraud summarizes the situation as follows: "in early 1924, last vestiges of the protectorate exercised by France for four centuries – and unbroken except for World War I – over the 'Latin' Christians of the former Ottoman Empire disappeared. The era of the privileged French presence in Palestine and more specifically in Jerusalem (...) had come to a close."

==== Restoring the status quo ====
Despite the official end of the French protectorate and a lesser role recognized by the ruling authority in Palestine, France was not inclined to diminish its influence in the region. Dominique Trimbur wrote "Paris and its representatives acted as if France still occupied the place of protective power which it had at the time of the Ottoman Empire." France sought to restore its traditional role in Palestine, to protect the Catholic communities. Dominique Trimbur stresses the role of Amédée Outrey, Consul General of France in Jerusalem from 1938 to 1941, in restoring the status quo: "for him, it (was) first of all a matter of serving as the arbitrator of the communities and of avoiding absolutely any British interference in their affairs." Through the restoration of buildings (Abbey of Abu Ghosh), maneuvers to have French citizens appointed to positions of responsibility, and the attribution of medals to the directors of seminars devoted to France, Outrée tried to restore France's historic dominance.

==== Cultural influence ====
France also sought to extend its influence through the diffusion of French culture throughout Mandatory Palestine. France aspired to open a lycée français, open to all races. However, in a context marked by heightened tensions between the Arab and Jewish communities, Zionist communities strongly opposed the project and it was later abandoned. It was later revised and reborn in 1934 as a French-Hebraic high school, but was never fully utilized as a working institution. Two projects finally came to fruition when Amédée Outrey was Consul General of France in Jerusalem : the French Cultural Center and a chair of French Civilization at Hebrew University were both opened during Outrey's mandate.

In a letter sent to the French Ministry of Foreign Affairs, the director of the French Cultural Center insisted on its neutrality amidst growing tension in Palestine. He wrote in 1935 "I have the honor to inform you that in the present state of things, the center remains politically uninvolved. It is so true that it is considered pro-Jewish by the Arabs and Germans, pro-Arab by the Jews, as far as the English are concerned, they seem to not care about our label and let us work in peace."

The French Cultural Center, located on Ben Yehuda Street in the new city of Jerusalem, was equipped with a library, and hosting conferences of French lectures by writers who came to Jerusalem. The establishment of this institution was deemed to be a success. The French cultural center was a major instrument in the diffusion of French culture.

==== Construction of the new Consulate ====
From 1843, the successive Consuls began to voice dissatisfaction with their housing conditions in Jerusalem; they found the living situation unhealthy, precarious and cramped. Above all, the housing conditions did not reflect France's prior rank in Palestine. In 1910, thanks to a contribution of Count Michel de Pierredon, France acquired 5,054 m^{2} of land in the west side of Jerusalem, next to the King David Hotel near the Old City. The architect Marcel Favier was then selected to draw the plan of the new building. The Consul General at that time was very involved in the conception of the building as shown in the following excerpt:

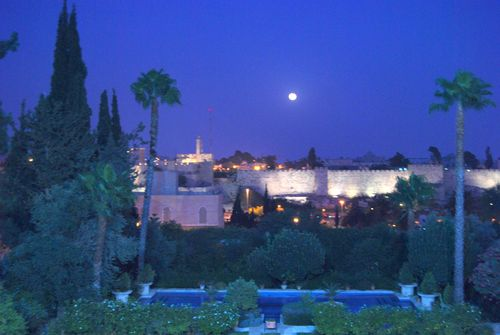
View at night from the veranda of the Consulate General

"In a letter, sent to his ministry and dated from July 4, 1927, he (the Consul General) suggested to position the main facade of the building facing the walls of the Old City. He established a precise description of the different rooms, as he envisioned the offices on the ground floor having two distinct entrances and waiting rooms so as to strictly separate the public and visitors. The first floor (should) have a loggia and a veranda, a reception hall and private apartments. The upper middle floor (should) be reserved for the servants; (...) He (also) suggested to use massive stone and to have a terrace roof. As far as the aspect was concerned, he plead for a simple style without decorations."

Construction of the building began towards the end of 1929 and was completed three years later in 1932. The imposing Neo-Renaissance style of the building was aimed at asserting France's prior influence in Palestine, at a time when France was being deprived of its ancient prerogatives by the Mandatory Powers.

The Consul General Amédée Outrey, aware of the role France could play on a cultural level, suggested in a letter sent to the Ministry in June 1938 that concerts of modern French music could be held in "the reception rooms in the Consular residence (that) offer the most pleasant context for artistic expressions.”

== The Consulate General since the creation of the state of Israel ==
=== The Consulate General: a unique sui generis status ===
Since the creation of the State of Israel and its recognition by France in 1948, the Consulate General of France in Jerusalem developed a unique sui generis status, as a diplomatic entity attached to the French Ministry of Foreign and European Affairs. The consulate is responsible for the area of the corpus separatum and the Israeli-occupied territories. The consulate's district includes Jerusalem, the Gaza Strip and the West Bank. During the Jordanian annexation of the West Bank, the Consulate General of France in Jerusalem was not attached to the Embassy of France in Amman. Today it is independent from the Embassy of France in Tel Aviv and does not have official diplomatic relations with Israel. All contacts with the State of Israel are under the exclusive jurisdiction of the Embassy in Tel Aviv. Since the establishment of the Palestinian Authority in 1994, the Consulate General of France has been the French diplomatic representative to the Palestinian National Authority. France maintains no official ties with Hamas but admitted contacts with the ruling party of the Gaza Strip.

As a result of this unique status and of the complex political situation, in a city divided from 1948 to 1967 between Israel and Jordan, the Consul General had to cross Mandelbaum Gate on a daily basis to reach the new premises of the Consulate General situated in East Jerusalem – first in the French national domain in the Holy Land of St Anne's church and later in Sheikh Jarrah neighborhood. The severance of diplomatic relations with Jordan from 1956 to 1962 made the situation yet more difficult to manage. King Hussein of Jordan questioned the status of French schools and religious congregations in Jordan, and the political and economic privileges to which they were entitled. He tried to end the duality of foreign diplomatic representation by removing laissez-passer for diplomatic missions.

Since the 1967 Six-Day War and the Israeli occupation of the West Bank and Gaza Strip, the function of the Consulate General of France has changed. Consulate operations in Jerusalem have been supported but have worsened in the West Bank and in the Gaza Strip, notably since Hamas takeover of the Gaza Strip and the imposition of the blockade in 2007. Diplomats, employees of the Consulate General and French artists have had difficulties in accessing the Gaza Strip, where the French Cultural Center has never ceased its operation. For example, fifteen French diplomats and consular employees were refused entry into the Gaza Strip in July 2009, where they were expected to celebrate the 14th of July.

==== France's position ====
The status of the Consulate General of France in Jerusalem is determined by France's position regarding the sovereignty of Jerusalem and the Palestinian Territories. According to the United Nations General Assembly Resolution 181 on November 29, 1947, "the city of Jerusalem shall be established as a corpus separatum under a special international regime and shall be administered by the United Nations". France aspired to play a role in the international city of Jerusalem and to uphold its historical rights. Olivier Danino suggests that this concept of corpus separatum aimed to create a special status that would allow the Holy City to escape the control of Israel and the future Palestinian state and would allow France to preserve its historic prevalence in Jerusalem.

France has remained committed to the idea of the internationalization of Jerusalem and has not recognized any unilateral measure. France adopted on November 22, the 1967 United Nations Security Council Resolution 242, calling upon Israel to cancel "all legislative and administrative measures and actions taken (...), including expropriation of land and properties thereon, which tend to change the legal status of Jerusalem” and “to rescind all such measures already taken and to desist forthwith from taking any further action which tend to change the status of Jerusalem”.

An expression of France's attachment to International law can be found in the speech that President François Mitterrand made to the Knesset in March 1982. While emphasizing Israel's right to exist inside secure and internationally recognized borders, he called for a homeland for Palestinians, which "for the Palestinians, can at the appropriate time mean a State... Because it is impossible to ask anyone to renounce their identity, nor to speak in their place."

During his visit to the Palestinian Territories in October 1996, a visit organized by the Consulate General of France in Jerusalem, President Jacques Chirac addressed the Palestinian Legislative Council in Ramallah, the first foreign President to do so. On this occasion, he reiterated the position of France on Jerusalem and the conflict: "The whole world has its eyes on Jerusalem, the thrice Holy City. I can understand the passions it inspires. Its holiness, for the Muslims and the Christians, as for the Jews, cannot be dissociated from its existence as a city. That means that in order to retain its unique identity, its plurality must be preserved. The solution for Jerusalem cannot be solely religious, or solely national. It is necessary that freedom of access for the faithful, all the faithful, be guaranteed everywhere. And any idea of sovereignty, from whatever quarter, must be fitted into the framework of the negotiated compromise planned by the Oslo agreements."

Calling for a negotiated solution to the conflict between Israel and the Palestinians, President Nicolas Sarkozy declared in a speech delivered to the Knesset in June 2008 that: "Israel’s security, on which France will never compromise, will be truly assured only when we see alongside her an independent, modern, democratic and viable Palestinian State".

Until a negotiated settlement is reached, the Consulate General of France will maintain the status of a consulate general and the functions of a quasi-embassy.

=== Duties of the Consulate General ===
==== Consular duties ====
The Consulate General of France in Jerusalem's activities include protecting the interests of French citizens temporarily or permanently residing in Jerusalem, the West Bank and the Gaza Strip, issuing passports, national identity cards and issuing visas to foreigners. The Consulate General of France estimates that the French community of Jerusalem, the West Bank and the Gaza Strip comprised 30,000 people in 2010. Of these, 10,000 were not registered at the Consulate General. The registered nationals at this Consulate general were mostly dual nationals, i.e. French-Israelis or French-Palestinians. The community was relatively young and comprised a large majority of French-Israelis. In 1996, the registered community was estimated at almost 9,000 people. The percentage of French-Israelis reached 95%, a majority of whom were originally from Morocco and Tunisia. They lived in Jerusalem and for some of them in Israeli settlements in the occupied Palestinian territories. The French-Palestinians were estimated at 1.5%. French members of Christian communities were estimated at 2%, while they constituted the majority of nationals in the early years of the history of the French Consulate in Jerusalem.

Regarding the visa application process, the access to the consulate has become difficult for the Palestinians living in the West Bank and in the Gaza Strip, as they now need a permit to enter Jerusalem. As a remedy, the Consulate collects visa applications through the French Cultural Center in Gaza.

==== Religious duties ====
Liturgical honors

Although France's protectorate over the Christians has ceased, France continues to enjoy honorable privileges. Tangible proof of its historic dominance is the liturgical honors rendered to the representatives of France in Jerusalem.

Catherine Nicault writes: "In terms of duties, France's representatives, the Ambassador in Constantinople and after 1843, the Consul General was obligated to assist the Latins in their disputes with or appeals to the Ottoman Authorities. (...) But the price paid for these efforts was rewarded since the representatives of France ruled over the Catholic clientele and during religious ceremonies held in the Holy Land, in particular in the Saint Sepulchre, were given carefully codified liturgical honors which made them the most eminent foreign dignitaries in Jerusalem."

Since 1843, the Consuls General of France in Jerusalem have been granted liturgical honors. The solemn entry ceremony, codified in a treaty signed by Aristide Briand, Minister of Foreign Affaires and Mgr Luigi Maglione, Apostolic Nuncio on December 4, 1926, has remained the same since then. A press release of the Consulate General of France in Jerusalem describes the latest solemn ceremony as follows:

The procession started at Jaffa Gate where the Consul General (Frederic Desagneaux) was hosted by the Franciscans of the Custody who accompanied him to the Church of the Holy Sepulchre. There, the Consul General greeted the superiors of the Greek, Franciscan and Armenian convents, guardians of the Holy Place, before going to the shrine where the gospel of the resurrection according to Saint Mark was proclaimed. The Custos of the Holy Land, Father Pierbattista Pizzaballa, made a speech welcoming the Consul General and recalling the prominent role incumbent upon France in the region. After the ceremony, the procession proceeded on foot, through Via Dolorosa in the Old City, towards St Anne's Church, a national domain entrusted to the White Fathers. After being welcomed by Father Thomas Maier, superior of the White Fathers, the Consul General reiterated the commitment of France to bear its responsibilities in the region, particularly in Jerusalem, on behalf of the spirit of peace and tolerance. The solemnity ended with the hymn Te Deum sung by the brothers and sisters of the Abbey of Abu Ghosh.

Protection of religious communities

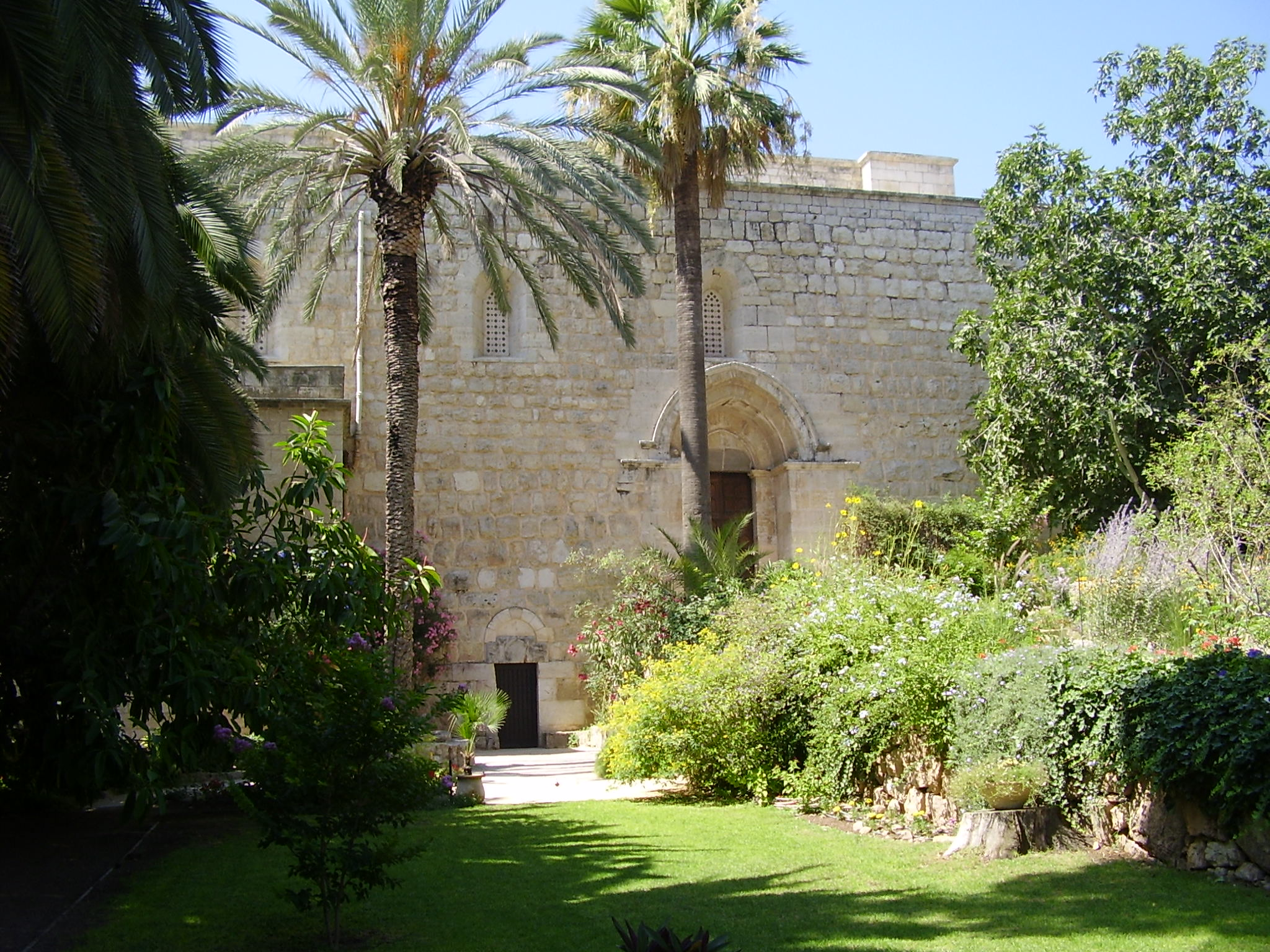
France's national domain: Abbey of Abu Gosh

France has lost its protectorate over the Holy Places, but continues to protect religious institutions, in virtue of the agreements of Mytilene (1901) and Constantinople (1913). According to an agreement reached by France and Israel in 1948 (so-called Chauvel-Fisher letters), the rights and privileges entitled to French institutions should be maintained.

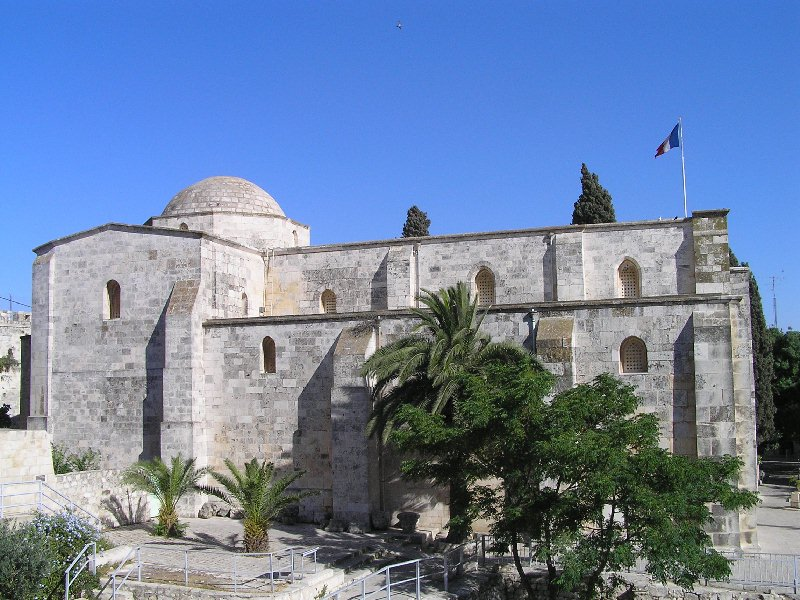
France's national domain: St Anne's church

52 institutions fall under the jurisdiction of the Consulate General of France in Jerusalem: hospitals, free health centers, hospices, orphanages, research institutes, seminaries, high schools and religious congregations. This comprises 600 monks and nuns, the majority of whom live in the district of Jerusalem. In addition to a legal and administrative support, these institutions benefit from subsidies from the Consulate General. Additionally, the religious communities that receive the protection of the Consulate General administer France's national domains. There are four sites in Jerusalem classified by France as "national domains", that fall under the jurisdiction of the Consulate General and that are administered by French religious communities: Saint Anne Church, Abbey of Abu Ghosh, Church of the Eleona and the Tombs of the Kings.

==== Political duties ====
In addition to being the diplomatic representation to the Palestinian Authority, the Consul General is also the representative of France to the United Nations Relief and Works Agency for Palestine Refugees in the Near East (UNRWA). Before the creation of the Palestinian Authority in 1994, the consulate had established cooperation with Palestinian NGOs, in the fields of education, culture, economics and finance, and health and humanitarian aid. When Yasser Arafat moved to Gaza City in July 1994, the Consulate General established official political ties with the Palestinian administration.

France's declared objective is to support "the creation of a viable, independent, democratic Palestinian state living in peace and security alongside Israel." To help achieve this objective, France strongly supports the peace process. France also supports an easing of the Gaza blockade, stating that it will serve the interest of all parties concerned in the conflict.

France also supports the establishment of the institutions of the future Palestinian State, in line with the spirit of the Paris International Donor's Conference, that France had initiated to provide financial support for the construction of the future state of Palestine. France contributes significantly to financially support the budget of the Palestinian Authority. According to a press release from the Consulate General: "The Prime Minister of the Palestinian Authority Salam Fayyad and the Consul General of France in Jerusalem Frederic Desagneaux signed on June 21, 2010 an agreement on a financial support of 23 million Euros by the French government to the budget of the Palestinian Authority for the year 2010." According to the French-Palestinian framework partnership document signed in Paris in December 2009, France will allocate 68 million Euros annually over a period of three years. French aid to the Palestinian Territories (200 million Euros over three years) will be devoted to support the water sector, urban infrastructure, municipal development and the private and health sectors.

==== France's cooperation in the Palestinian territories ====
The Consulate General has a significant policy of cooperation in the Palestinian Territories in multiple fields: education, culture, economy and finance, health and humanitarian aid.

The Consulate General has developed a large network of cultural centers in Jerusalem and in the Palestinian Territories. In addition to the French Cultural Center established in West Jerusalem in the early 20th century, there are now four other cultural centers in East Jerusalem, Ramallah, Nablus and Gaza. They promote cultural exchange through lectures, art exhibition and musical events. They also offer language teaching programs.

The volume of cooperation in the development sector is significant. In 2005, the amount of development aid reached 400,000 Euros. It was multiplied by 4 between 2005 and 2008. The French Development Agency coordinates the implementation of financial aid. Since 2002, the French Development Agency has allocated 11 million Euros to support NGOs in Palestine.

== Chronological list of Consuls and Consuls Generals in Jerusalem ==
Consuls Generals

- Nicolas Kassianides 2023–Present
- René Troccaz 2019–2023
- Pierre Cochard 2016–2019
- Hervé Magro 2013–2016
- Frédéric Desagneaux 2009–2013
- Alain Remy 2005–2009
- Régis Koetschet 2002–2005
- Denis Pietton 1999–2002
- Stanislas de Laboulaye 1996–1999
- Jean de Gliniasty 1991–1995
- Gilles d’Humières 1988–1991
- Jean–Claude Cousseran 1986–1988
- Jean Guéguinou 1982–1986
- Bernard Lopinot 1978–1982
- Pierre Bitard 1975–1978
- Paul Henry 1970–1975
- Christian Fouache d’Halloy 1966–1970
- Lucien Lemoine 1963–1966
- Christian Marcotte de Sainte-Marie 1960–1963
- André Favereau 1958–1959
- Marcel Laforge 1955–1957
- Bernard Rochereau de La Sablière 1952–1954
- René Neuville 1946–1952

Delegation of Free France from 1941 to 1946

- Guy du Chaylard 1942–1946
- Henri Zimmermann 1941–1942
- Amédée Outrey 1937–1940
- Jacques d’Aumale 1928–1937
- Alphonse Doire 1926–1928
- Gaston Maugras 1924–1925
- Louis Rais 1919–1924

World War I

- George Gueyraud 1908–1914
- George Outrey 1905–1908
- Auguste Boppe 1902–1904
- Honoré Daumas 1902
- Ernest Auzépy 1898–1901
- Charles Ledoulx 1893–1898

In 1893 The consulate was elevated to the status of Consulate General.

Consuls

- Charles Ledoulx 1885–1893
- Lucien Monge 1885
- Charles Destrees 1883–1885
- Adrien Langlais 1881–1883
- Salvator Patrimonio 1873–1881
- Ernest Crampon 1871–1873
- Joseph Sienkiewicz, Manager 1 October 1868 To January 31, 1872.
- Edmond De Barrere 1855–1871
- Paul-Émile Botta 1848–1855
- Joseph Helouis–Jorelle
- Edmond Barrère, Manager From 1 December 1844 To December 15, 1845
- Gabriel de Lantivy 1843–1844

From 1776 To 1790, Jerusalem comes under the authority of the "Consul General For Syria And Palestine", In Residence at Seyda.

- Jean de Blacas 1713–1714
- Sébastien de Brémond 1699–1700

From 1694 To 1699, Jerusalem comes under the authority of the "Consul for Palestine, Galilee, Judea And Samaria", In Residence In Syria

- Jean Lempereur 1621–1625

== See also ==
- Palais de France, Istanbul
- List of consulates-general in Jerusalem
