= Fischer-Chauvel Agreement =

1948 agreement between France and Israel

The Fischer-Chauvel Agreement (or Fischer-Chauvel Agreements) is an agreement made in 1948 and 1949 between the French and Israeli governments involving the status of a number of French institutions in the newly-founded State of Israel and claimed by France as the French national domain in the Holy Land. The agreement was signed for Israel by Maurice Fischer (1903–1965), an Israeli diplomat in France at the time.

Israel holds the view that the Israeli Declaration of Independence created a new international personality that is not a successor state of the Ottoman Empire or the British Mandate and so it is bound only by those former international obligations affecting the territory as Israel might accept. Under Israeli law, the Knesset must ratify international agreements before they become part of domestic law, which it has never done in the case of the Fischer-Chauvel Agreement. Nevertheless, Israel has maintained the previous tax exemptions and privileges of the sites claimed as domaine national.

The French claims are based on claimed acquisitions predating the formation of the State of Israel, specifically in the Accords of Mytilene of November 1901, the Agreement of Constantinople of 18 December 1913, and the Fischer-Chauvel Agreement of 6 September 1948 to 31 January 1949.

== French national domain in the Holy Land ==
There are four sites in Jerusalem claimed by France as domaine national:

- Church of the Pater Noster, also known as the Sanctuary of the Eleona
- Benedictine monastery in Abu Ghosh
- Tombs of the Kings
- Church of Saint Anne

== Incidents ==
The agreement was invoked by France in late 1963 in a so-called "Of Pigs and Men" affair, involving some 40 pigs being raised in the convent of Les Filles de la Charitė in Ein Kerem despite a ban by Israel on such activity.

French presidents have claimed that the Church of Saint Anne in Jerusalem remains under French protection, is owned by the French Republic, and is therefore a dependency of the French territory. In 1996, during Jacques Chirac's visit to Jerusalem, the French president refused to enter the church until Israeli soldiers who were accompanying him had left. On 22 January 2020, French President Emmanuel Macron demanded that Israeli security services leave the church compound and invoked "the rules that have existed for several centuries". The Israeli government has not made any public statement relating to the French incidents.

On November 7, 2024, a new diplomatic incident between France and Israel occurred at the Church of the Pater Noster when Israeli soldiers arrested French gendarmes protecting the Catholic place of worship, de facto not recognizing its jurisdiction as a French domain.

== See also ==
- Capitulations of the Ottoman Empire, also known as the French Protectorate of Jerusalem
- Hashemite custodianship of Jerusalem holy sites
- Status Quo (Jerusalem and Bethlehem)
