= Benedictine monastery in Abu Ghosh =

Monastery of the Olivetan Benedictine order in Israel

St Mary of the Resurrection Abbey Abu Ghosh
- Abbaye Sainte-Marie de la Résurrection d'Abu Gosh
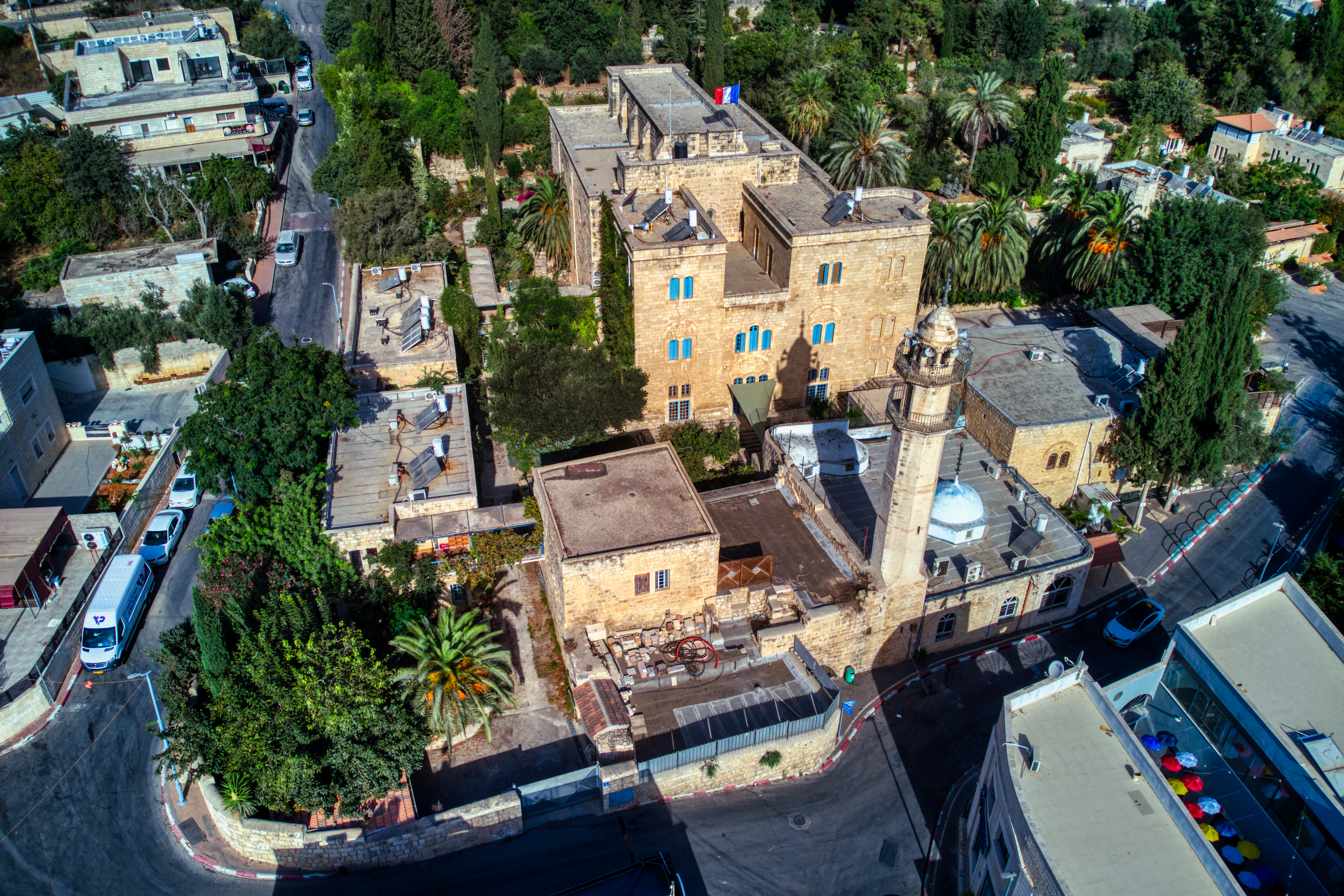
- Interactive map of St Mary of the Resurrection Abbey Abu Ghosh

Monastery information
- Order: Benedictines

Site
- Country: Israel, state property of France (Note: The French state owns multiple religious properties in Jerusalem under historical religious and diplomatic duties to protect Christian sites in the Holy Land. The official stance of France is for a two-state solution and has advocated for corpus separatum for the city of Jerusalem. This property is held under extraterritoriality but it is not sovereign land or a territorial possession of France.)
- Coordinates: 31.80734°N 35.10793°E

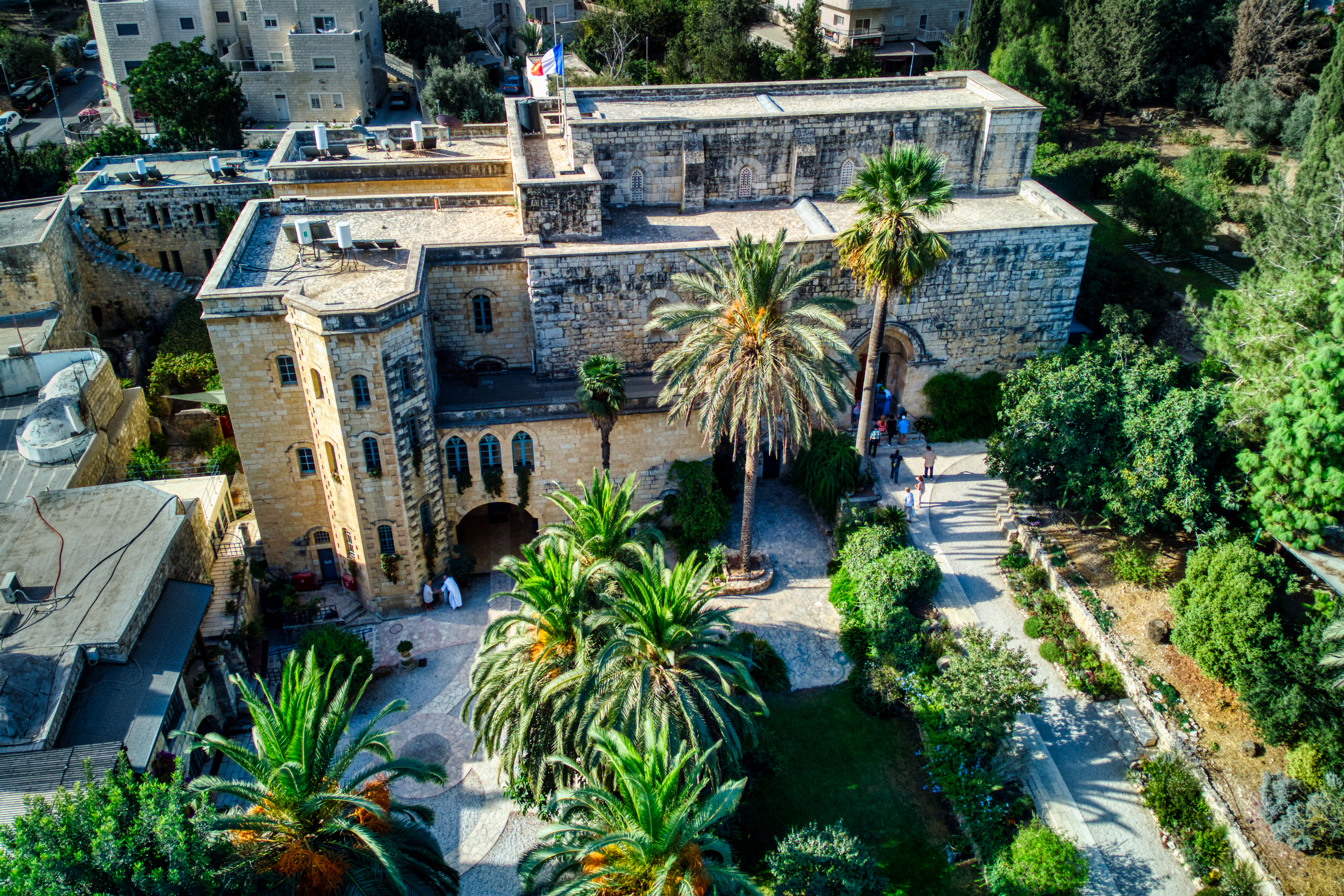
Benedictine monastery in Abu Ghosh

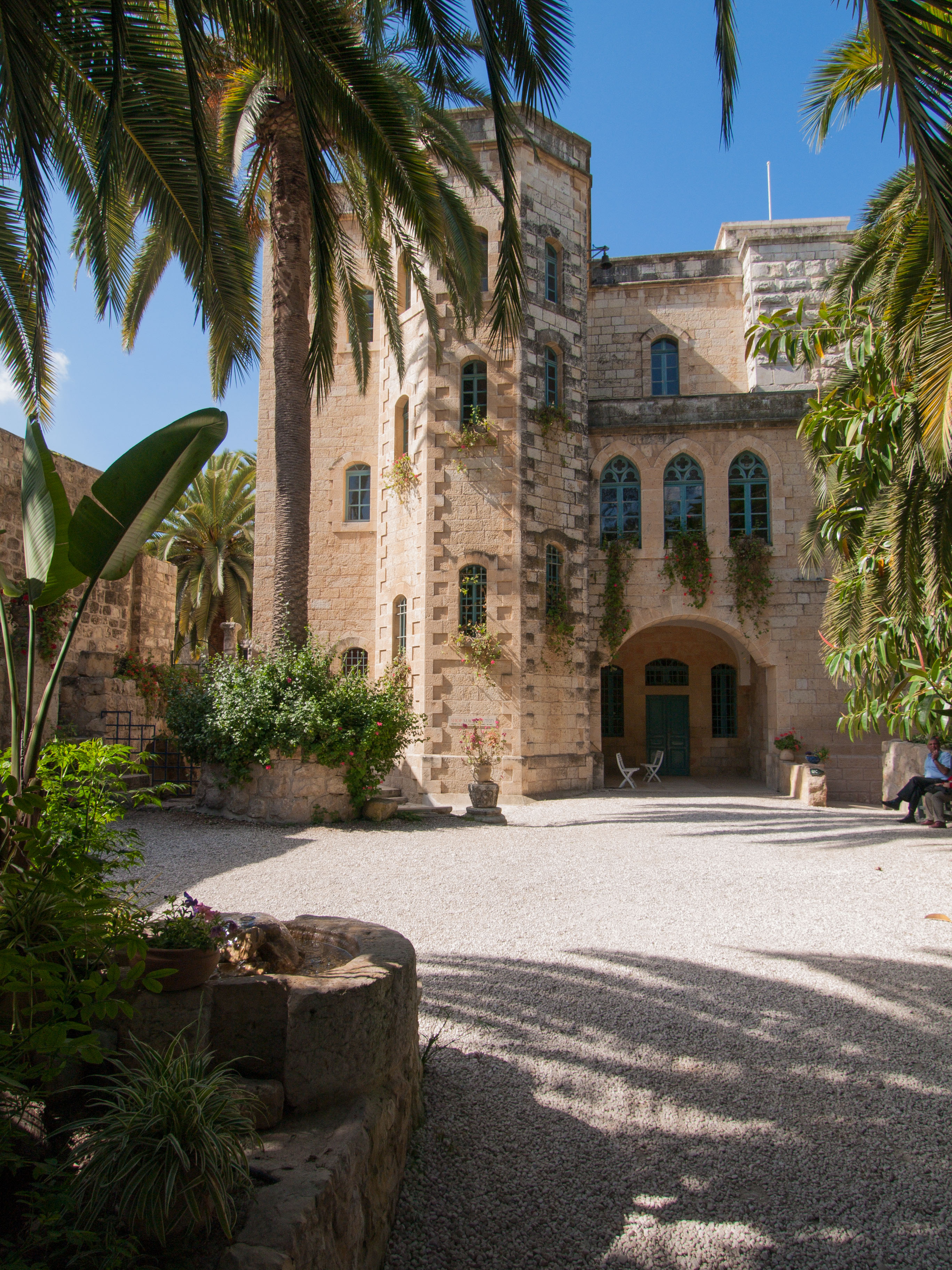
Abu Ghosh monastery

The Benedictine monastery in Abu Ghosh, officially St Mary of the Resurrection Abbey, (French: Abbaye Sainte-Marie de la Résurrection d'Abu Gosh; Arabic: دير القديسة مريم للقيامة بأبو غوش; Hebrew: המנזר הבנדיקטיני באבו גוש) is a monastery run by the Olivetan Benedictine order in Abu Ghosh, Israel.

Its church is built on the foundations of the Crusader-period Church of the Resurrection, or Church of our Lord's Resurrection. It was established in the 12th century on top of Roman ruins in the center of Abu Ghosh, known by the Crusaders as Fontenoid. Until the 19th century, the Arabs called the village Qaryet al-'Inab. The site was associated by the Crusaders with Emmaus from the Gospel of Luke.

France claims ownership of the land as the French national domain in the Holy Land, under the Ottoman capitulations and says this was formalised by the Fischer-Chauvel Agreement of 1948, which has not been ratified by Israel.

== History ==
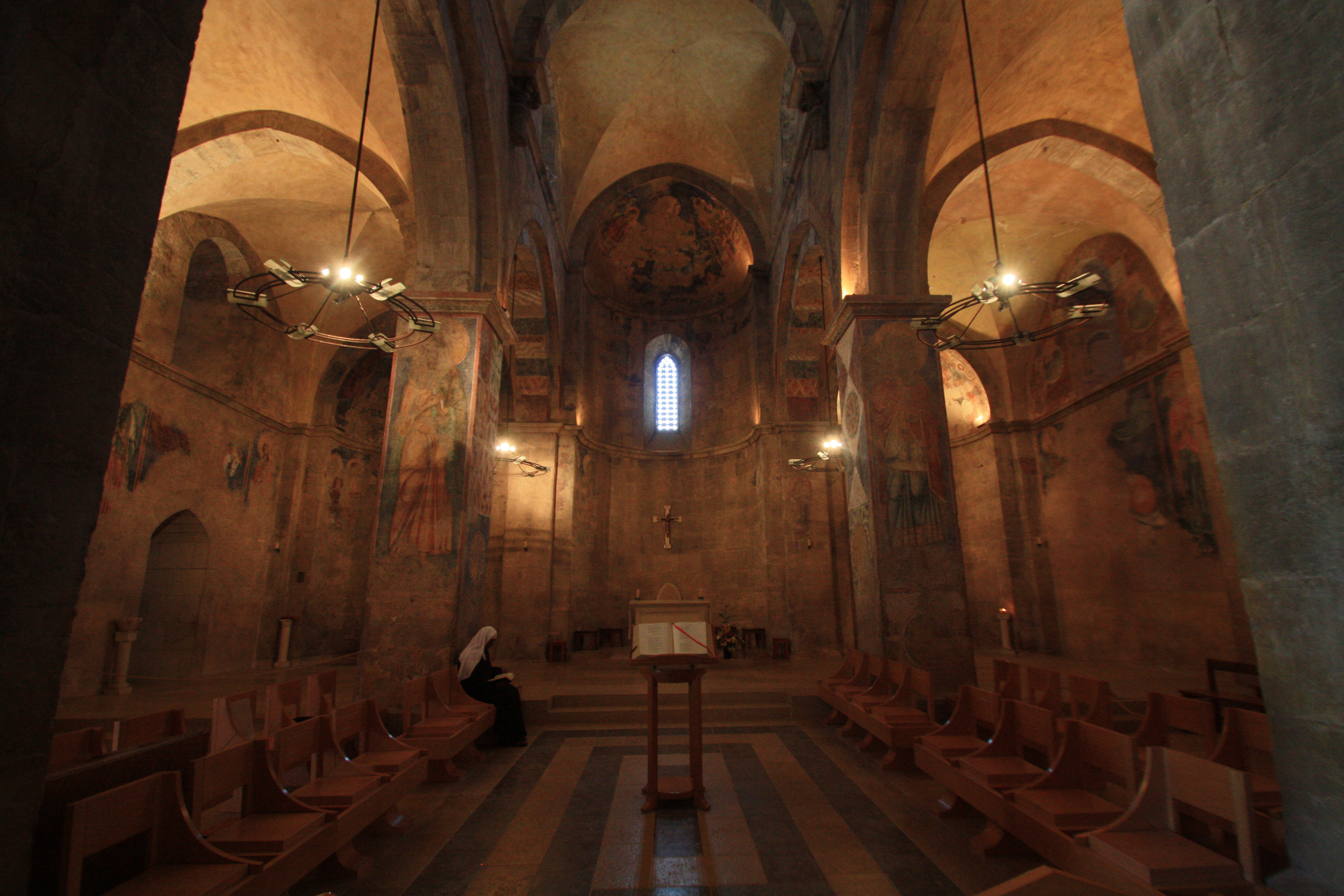
Church of the Resurrection with Crusader-era frescoes

The late Romanesque/early Gothic-style church was built by the Hospitallers in 1140. It was acquired by the French government in 1899 and placed under the guardianship of the French Benedictine Fathers. Edward Robinson (1838) described it as "obviously from the time of the crusades, and [...] more perfectly preserved than any other ancient church in Palestine." Excavations carried out in 1944 confirm that the Crusaders identified the site as the biblical Emmaus. The church is built over an ancient spring.

From 1956, the monastery was run by the Lazarist Fathers.

Today a double monastery of nuns and priests worship in the church and offer hospitality, commemorating the New Testament story of the couple on the Jerusalem–Emmaus road.

The walls are bearing traces of the Crusader-period frescoes, painted in Byzantine style and restored between 1995 and 2001.

== See also ==
- Christianity in Israel

=== Crusader churches in Palestine ===
- Church of Saint Anne, Jerusalem
- Tomb of the Virgin Mary, once part of the Abbey of Saint Mary of the Valley of Jehosaphat
- Church of the Nativity
