= Church of the Pater Noster =

Roman Catholic church in Jerusalem

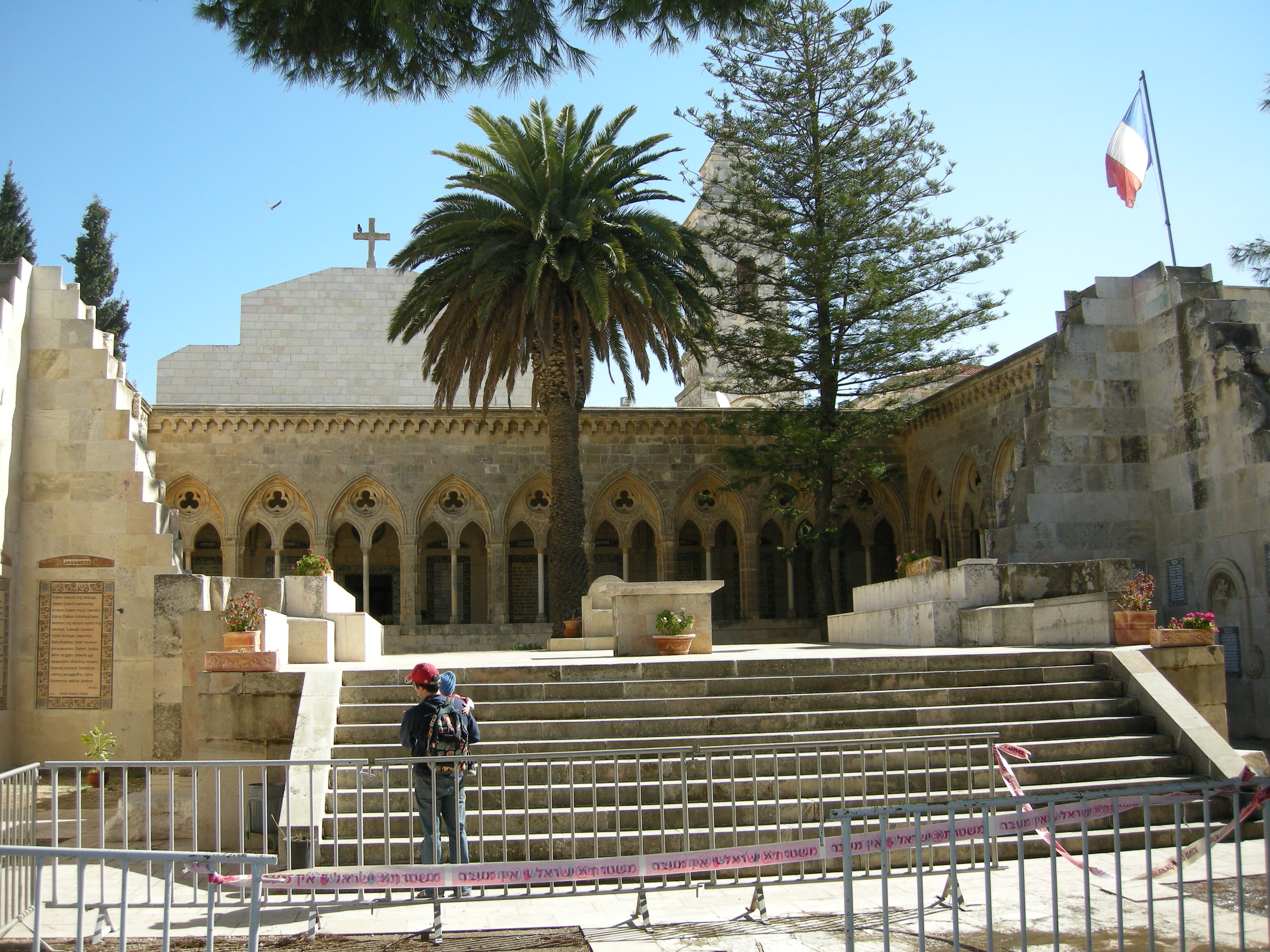
- Church of the Pater Noster, 2009
- Church of the Pater Noster
- 31°46′41″N 35°14′42″E
- Location: Mount of Olives
- Address: East Jerusalem
- Country: Disputed between Israel and Palestine, state property of France (Note: The French state owns multiple religious properties in East Jerusalem under historical religious and diplomatic duties to protect Christian sites in the Holy Land. The official stance of France is for a two-state solution and has advocated for corpus separatum for the city of Jerusalem. This property is held under extraterritoriality but it is not sovereign land or a territorial possession of France.)
- Denomination: Catholic
- Religious institute: Carmelites
- Website: https://www.carmeldejerusalem.com/en

History
- Status: Active
- Founder(s): Constantine the Great (Eleona basilica); Aurelia de Bossi (modern Pater Noster Church)

Architecture
- Architect(s): Eugene Viollet-le-Duc, André Lecomte du Nouÿ - Pater Noster cloister; Marcel Favier - new church over Eleona ruins
- Style: Late Roman (Constantinian) basilica (Eleona); Romanesque Revival (Pater Noster Church)
- Groundbreaking: early 4th century (Eleona); 1860s (Pater Noster Church)
- Completed: 1872 - the Carmelite convent

Specifications
- Materials: Stone

The Church of the Pater Noster (French: Église du Pater Noster; Arabic: كنيسة باتر نوستر; Hebrew: כנסיית אבינו שבשמים) is a Catholic church located on the Mount of Olives in Jerusalem. It is part of a Carmelite monastery of cloistered nuns, also known as the Sanctuary of the Eleona. The Church of the Pater Noster stands next to the ruins of the 4th-century Late Roman/Early Byzantine Church of Eleona. The ruins of the Eleona were rediscovered in the 20th century and its walls were partially rebuilt. Today, France administers the land on which both churches and the entire monastery are standing, following the Ottoman capitulations, as the Eleona Domain (French: Domaine de l'Éléona), part of the French national domain in the Holy Land, which has been formalised by the Fischer-Chauvel Agreement of 1948-49, though the agreement has not been ratified by Israel's Knesset.

== Biblical background ==
The 2nd-century Acts of John mentions the existence of a cave on the Mount of Olives associated with the teachings of Jesus, but not specifically the Lord's Prayer.

== History ==
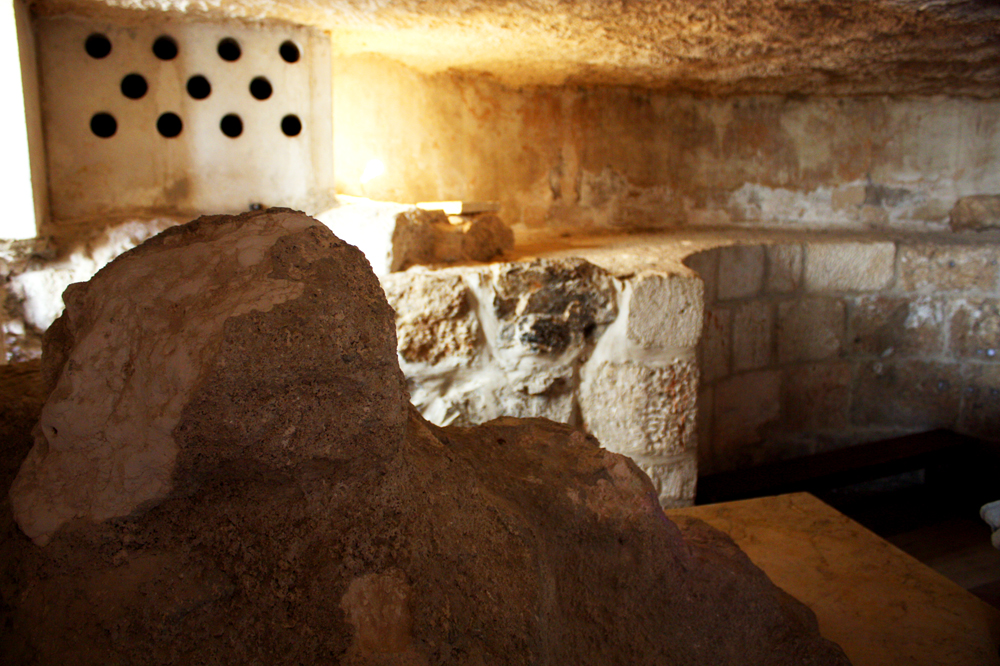
The Grotto, that is believed to be a place where Jesus taught the Lord's Prayer to His disciples.

=== Constantine and the Byzantine period ===
The modern Church of the Pater Noster is built right next to the site of a fourth-century basilica commissioned by Constantine I. The latter was built under the direction of Constantine's mother Helena in the early 4th century, who named it the Church of the Disciples. The pilgrim Egeria is the oldest surviving source referring to it as the Church of the Eleona (Greek for olive grove) in the late 4th century. The church is mentioned by the Bordeaux pilgrim in the Itinerarium Burdigalense circa 333, and the historian Eusebius of Caesarea recounts that Constantine constructed a church over a cave on the Mount of Olives that had been linked with Jesus initiating his disciples in his mysteries, but was not associated with the Ascension.

The church survived intact until it was destroyed by the Persian Sasanids in 614.

=== Crusader church ===
The memory of Jesus' teaching remained associated with this site, and during the Crusades it became exclusively associated with the teaching of the Lord's Prayer. The Crusaders built a small oratory amid the ruins in 1106, and a full church was constructed in 1152, thanks to funds donated by the Danish Bishop Svend of Viborg, who is buried inside the church. The Crusader-era church was heavily damaged during Sultan Saladin's siege of Jerusalem in 1187, eventually being abandoned and falling into ruin by 1345.

=== Modern church and ruins recovered ===
In 1851, the remaining stones of the 4th-century church were sold for tombstones in the Valley of Jehoshaphat.

The site was acquired by Aurelia de Bossi, through marriage Princess Aurélie de la Tour d'Auvergne (1809–1889) in the second half of the 19th century, at the advice of Marie-Alphonse Ratisbonne, a French Jewish convert to Catholicism, and a search for the cave mentioned by early pilgrims began. In 1868, the princess built a cloister and in 1872 she founded a Carmelite convent. The convent church was erected in the 1870s. The princess died in Florence in 1889, and her remains were brought to the church in 1957, according to her last wish.

In 1910, the foundations of the ancient church that once stood over the venerated cave were finally found, partly stretching beneath the modern cloister. The convent was moved nearby and reconstruction of the Byzantine church began in 1915. The reconstruction works, undertaken by the French government, were stopped in 1927 when funds ran out, and the new-old building remains unfinished. The French architect Marcel Favier, who was put in charge of rebuilding the ancient church, arrived in Jerusalem in September 1926.

=== 21st century ===
On November 7, 2024, a diplomatic incident occurred at the church when Israeli Defense Forces detained two French gendarmes and prevented a scheduled visit from the French Foreign Minister Jean-Noel Barrot who was in Israel to discuss potential ceasefire deals in the Gaza war.

== Design and layout ==
=== 4th-century Byzantine church ===
The 4th-century Late Roman/Early Byzantine church has been partially reconstructed and provides a good sense of what the original was like. The church's dimensions are the same as the original's and the garden outside the three doors outlines the atrium area. The church is unroofed and has steps that lead into a grotto where some Christians believe that Jesus revealed to his disciples his prophecy of the destruction of Jerusalem and the second coming. Unfortunately, the cave containing the grotto partially collapsed when it was discovered in 1910. It also cuts partly into a 1st-century tomb.

As one enters the south door of the Byzantine church, on the left there are fragments of the mosaic floor of the baptistery.

Dominican friar and archeologist, Father Louis-Hugues Vincent, has drawn a reconstruction of the ancient church based on the early-20th-century findings. The complex consisted of following elements on a west - east axis:

- a raised balcony, accessed from north and south by two staircases
- a portico (19 x 3.5 m) with six columns holding a roof and a façade pierced by three doors
- an open, rectangular peristyle atrium (25 x 19 m), with a cistern at its center
- the church proper, a basilica (35 x 19 m)
  - the façade with three doorways; there was no narthex between atrium and basilica
  - the nave (11 m wide) was separated by two rows of six columns from the aisles.
  - Each of the two aisle was 4 m wide and had a staicases at the east end, on the sides of the sanctuary, leading down to the crypt.
  - a raised chancel (bema), reached by two staircases, with a stone-carved screen and an apse in the east. Vincent describes the apse (4.5 m deep, 9 m wide) as external and polygonal, with Wiegand (ZDPV 1923) and Avi-Yonah noting that on the outside, the church-head was rectangular.
  - The existence of two rooms flanking the apse was suggested, or of just one pastophorium on the north side, but no hard evidence exists.
  - The crypt (7 m long and 4.5 m wide) sat in a cave under the chancel. It was reached by two staircases from the aisles. The apse (semi-circular, 3m in diameter) was on the east, and a Second Temple period kokhim burial cave to the west. Screen plate and columnet fragments were found in the apse area.
- baptistery: annexed to the outer wall of the church at its south-west corner. One rectangular room opened into a second, which contained a rectangular baptismal pool (1 x 0.72 m, preserved; partially rock-cut, partially masonry-built). Vincent (1957) dates it to the end of the 4th or the early 5th century.

=== 19th-century church ===
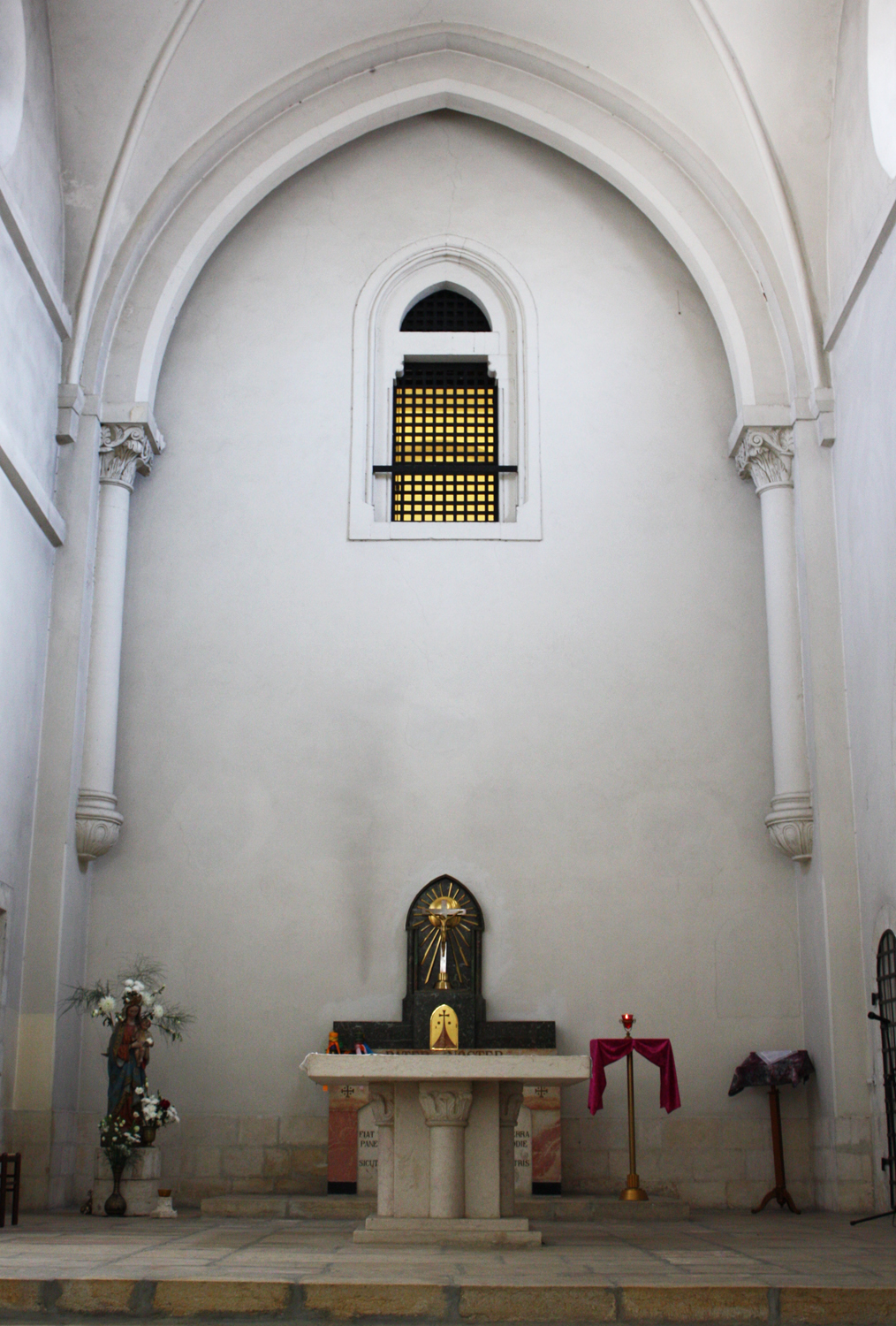
Altar of the modern Church of the Pater Noster

The 19th-century cloister is modelled on the Camposanto Monumentale in Pisa, Italy. It separates the partly reconstructed Byzantine church, which stands west of it, from the small 19th-century convent church, which stands east of it.

Princess Aurelia Bossi's tomb stands in the western lateral chamber of the narthex, on the right-hand side as one enters the church.

=== Lord's Prayer plaques ===
The walls of the cloister, of the convent church and the partially reconstructed Eleona church are all used to display plaques that bear the Lord's Prayer in a total of well over 100 different languages and dialects.

== Location ==
The church is located in the At-Tur district of Jerusalem, which has a population of about 18,000 mostly Muslim Arabs, with a small Christian minority.

== Gallery ==
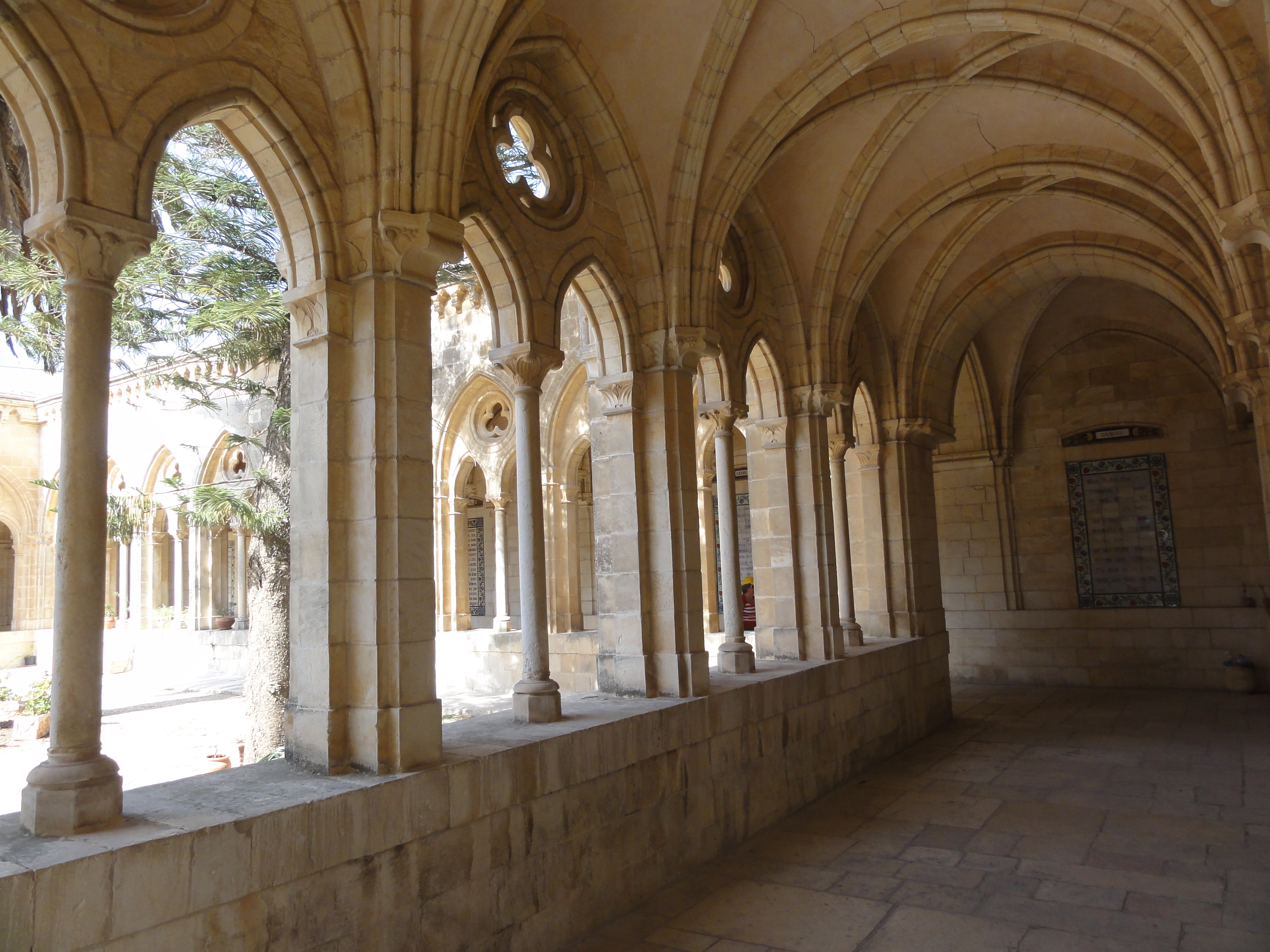
View from the cloister

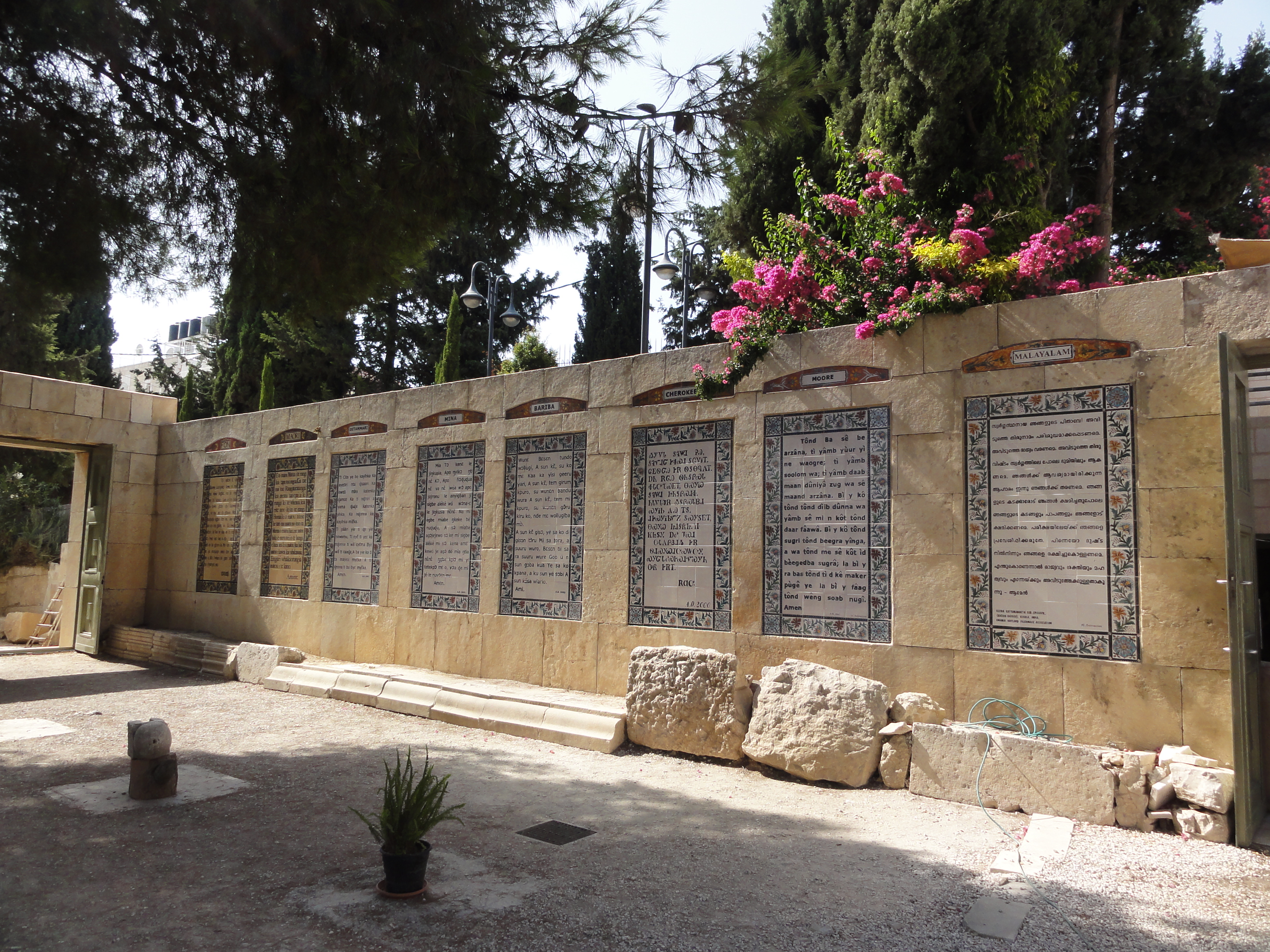
The Lord's Prayer in multiple languages

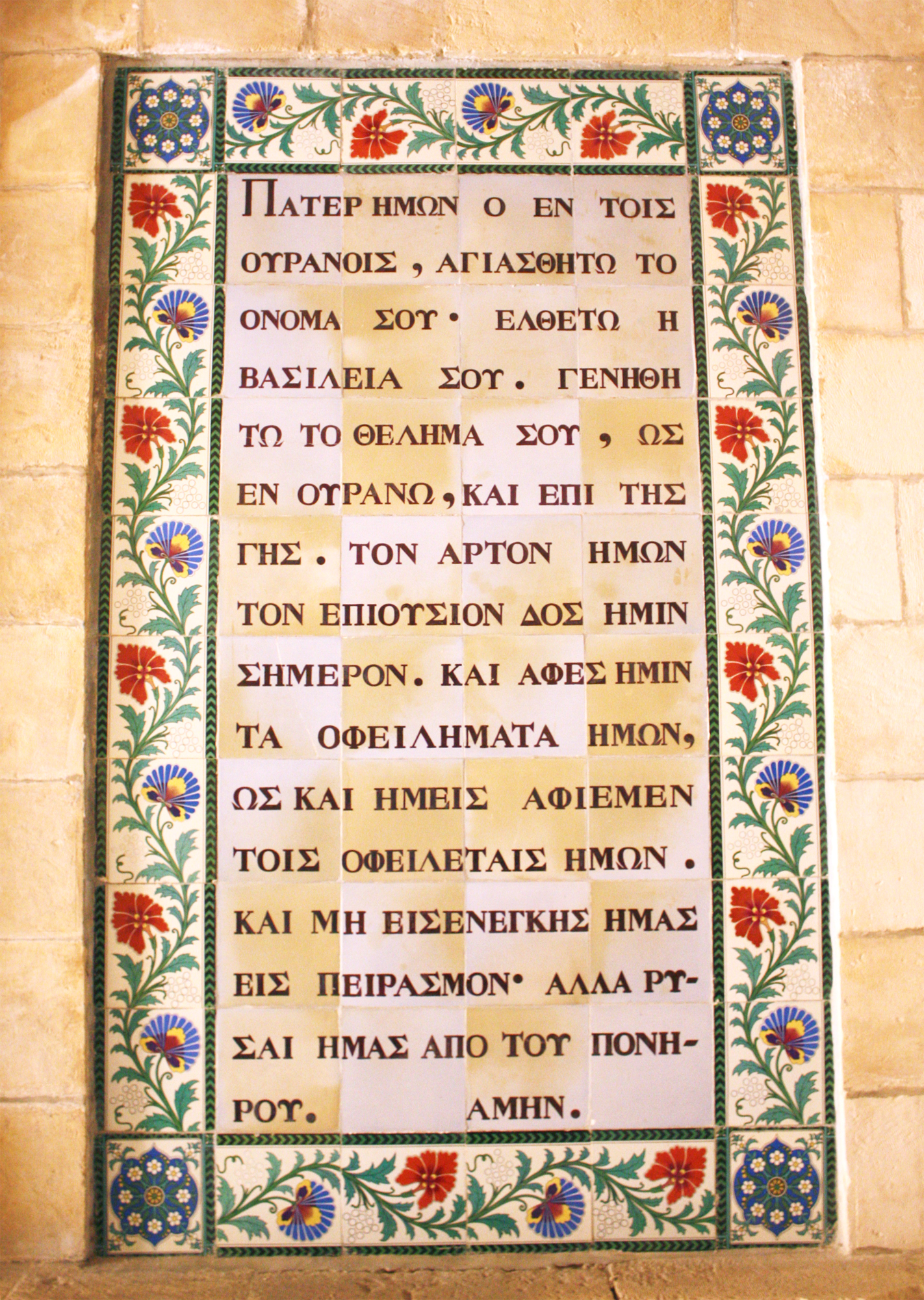
The Lord's Prayer in Koine Greek

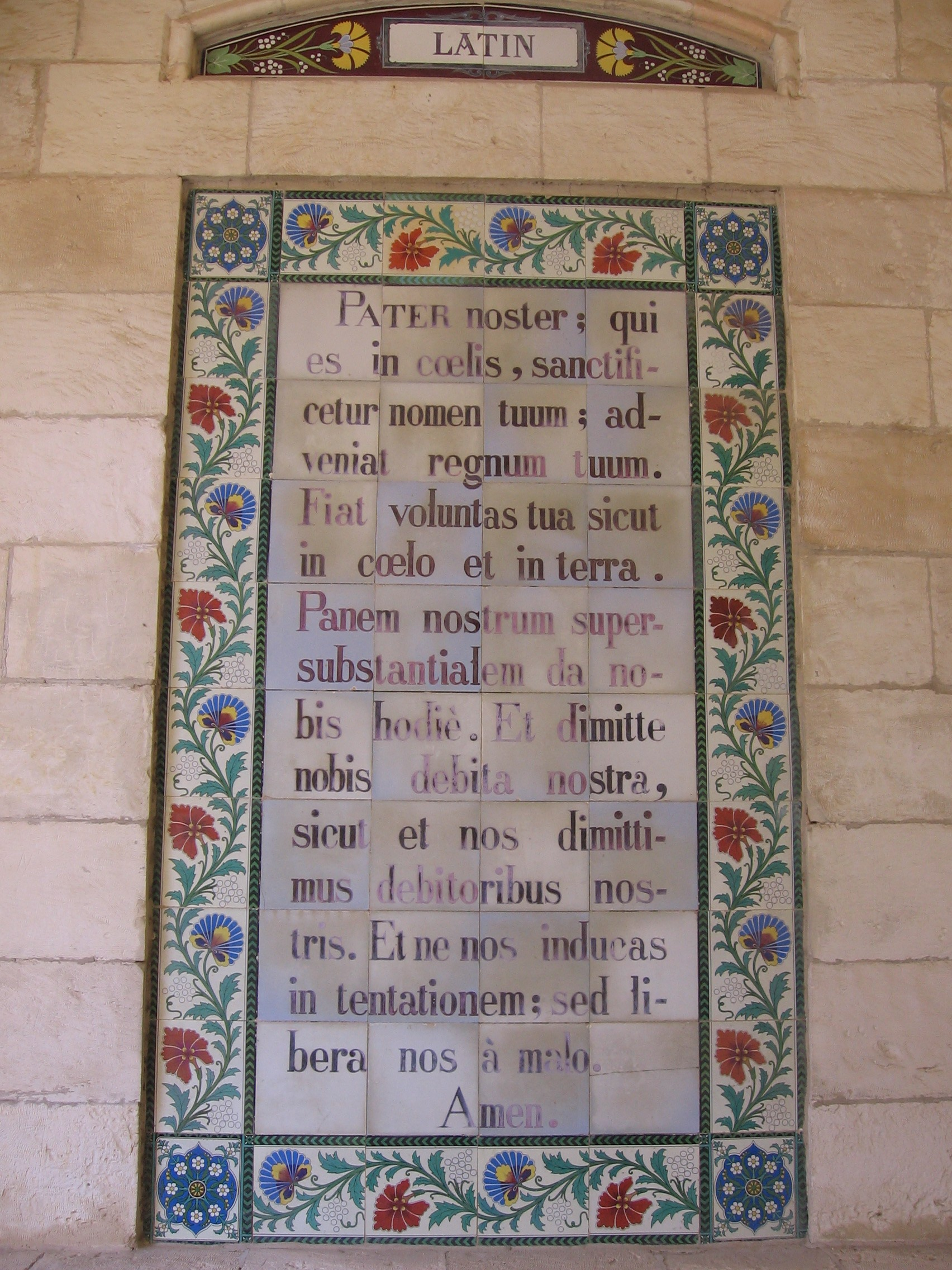
The Lord's Prayer in Latin

Video presentation by local guide (reasonably correct)

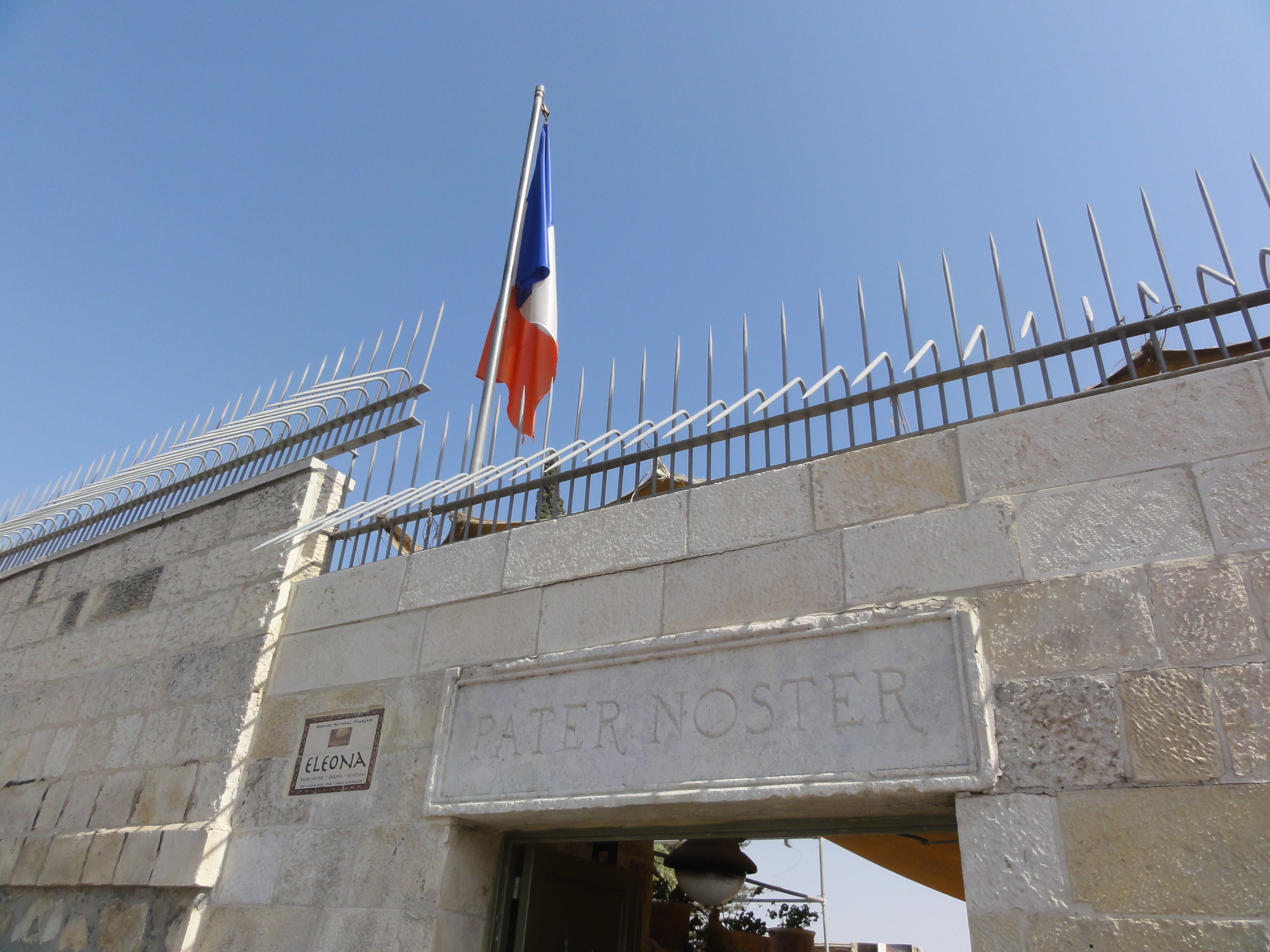
French flag flying at the church

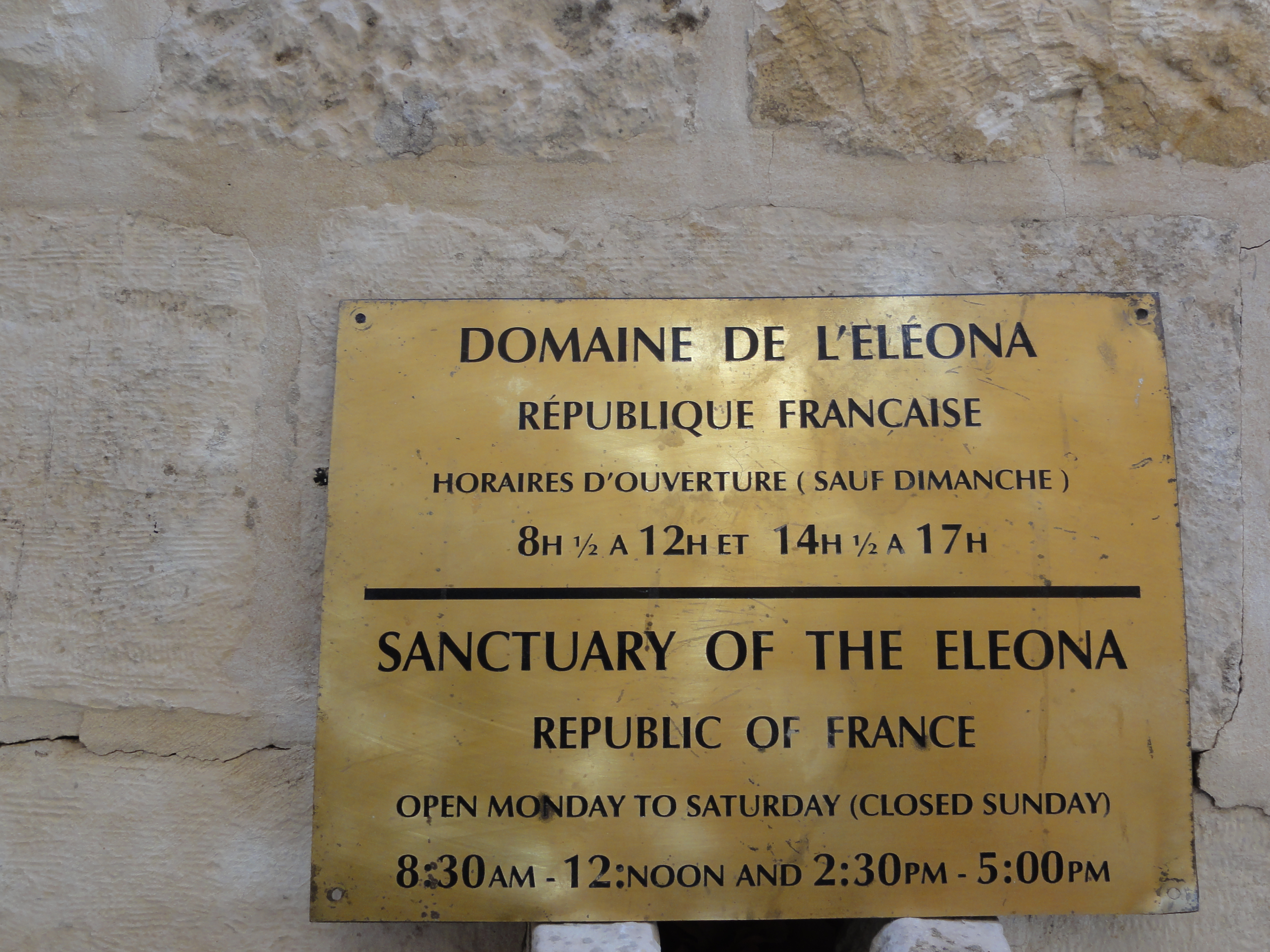
Sign listing the church as a "national domain" of France

== See also ==
- Chapel of the Ascension, nearby pilgrimage site, once misidentified with the site of the Church of the Eleona
