= French national domain in the Holy Land =

French National Domain in the Holy Land Domaine national français en Terre sainte
- State properties of France
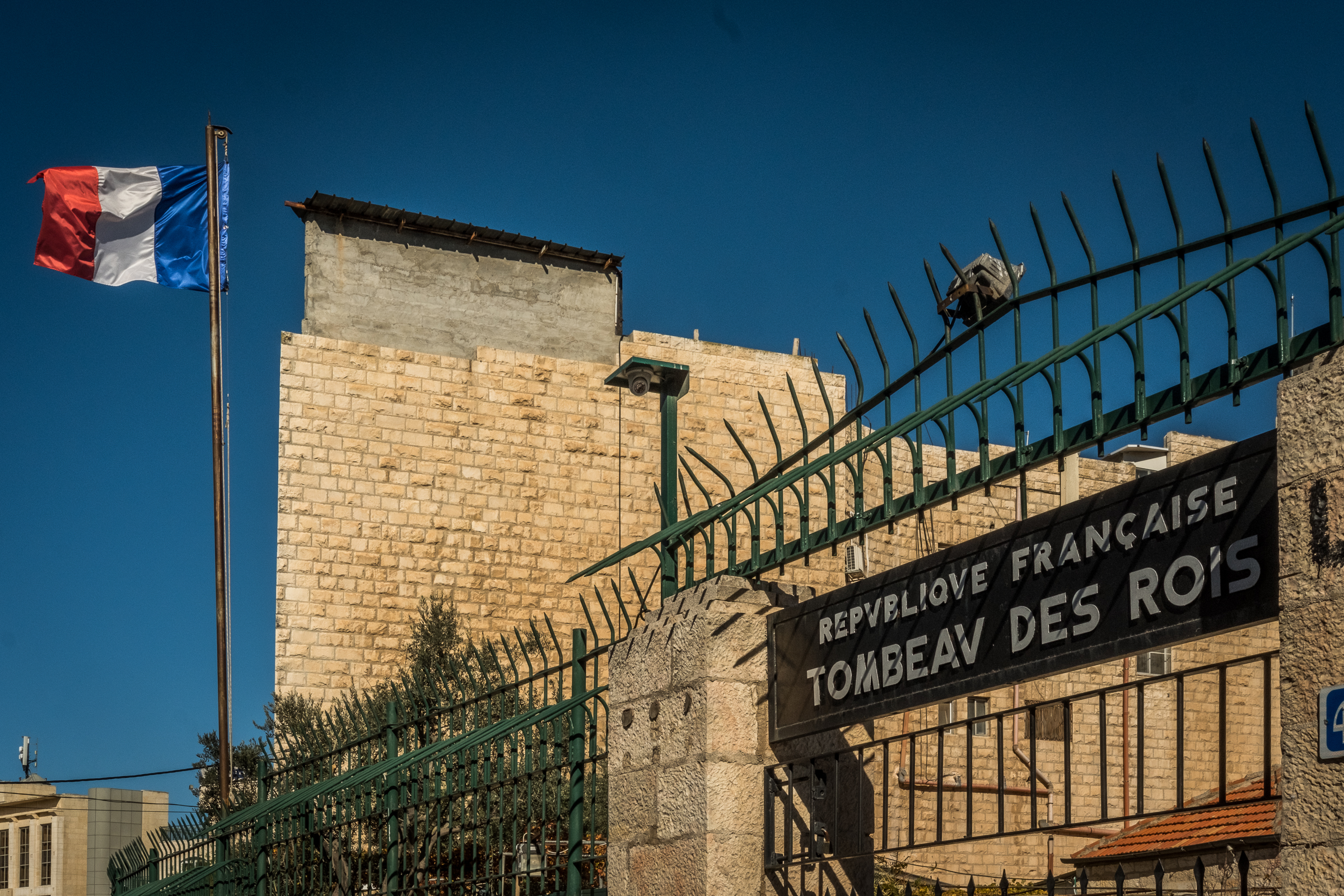
- Entry to the Tombs of the Kings in Jerusalem.

- Flag Coat of arms

- Properties under the French national domain around Jerusalem

Government
  - Body: Consulate General of France, Jerusalem

The French National Domain in the Holy Land is a set of French state properties located in Eastern Jerusalem. This area unites possessions that belonged to the French empire beginning in the 19th century.

This domain is managed and administered by the Consulate General of France in Jerusalem.

== Description ==
The domain brings together four possessions in Jerusalem that belonged to the French historically.

- The Church of the Pater Noster, or Éléona, in East Jerusalem. The estate is located on the Mount of Olives, and is part of a Carmelite monastery. The Church stands next to the ruins of a Byzantine Church from the 4th century.
- The Benedictine monastery in Abu Ghosh is a Olivetan Benedictine monastery built on the foundations of a Crusader-period Church known as the Church of our Lord's Resurrection. The Church was renovated by France, and has welcomed Benedictine monks and nuns since 1976.
- The Tombs of the Kings are a rock-cut funerary complex believed to be the burial site of Queen Helene of Adiabene; the tombs are 820 m (2,690 ft) north of the Old City in the Sheikh Jarrah neighbourhood.
- The Church of Saint Anne is a Roman Catholic church next to the Lions' Gate. Dating back to the 12th century, the church is believed to be built on the site which was once the house of the Virgin Mary's parents.

With the exception of the Tomb of the Kings, these possessions are of exclusive importance to Christian spirituality in the country.

== History ==
French presence in Jerusalem dates back to the Crusades. After the fall of the Crusader states, it was officially recognised through the Ottoman Capitulations of 1536 passed by Suleiman the Magnificent and Francis I of France. In the following years and centuries, additional capitulations and contracts were signed between the rulers of both nations to protect the holy sites and pilgrims of the Holy Land.

The first French possession in Jerusalem was the Church of Saint Anne, which was offered to Napoleon III by Abdülmecid I in 1856 as a token of gratitude for France's intervention in the then-recent Crimean War.

The land on which the Church of the Pater Noster stands was acquired in 1856 by Aurélie de La Tour d'Auvergne, who commissioned architect Eugène Viollet-le-Duc to build a monastery. She donated the property to France in 1868.

The Tomb of the Kings was excavated by French archaeologists starting in 1863 before being acquired by the Pereire brothers in 1871. They donated the site in 1886 to the French state "to preserve it for science and for the veneration of the faithful children of Israel."

The Abu Ghosh Monastery was given to France in 1873 by Sultan Abdulaziz as compensation for the loss of the Church of Saint George in Lod which had been given to the Greek Orthodox community two years earlier.

French possessions did not face contest or challenge by Ottoman authorities. From 1517, when the Ottomans conquered the region, agreements such as the Mytilene Accords in 1901 and the Constantinople Agreement in 1913 reaffirmed France's possession and administration over these properties. This remained in place until the British conquest of Palestine in December 1917.

These rights were later reaffirmed again by the successors of the Ottoman Empire in the region: the British authorities until 1948, then the State of Israel, which was established on 14 May 1948 and recognised de facto by France on 24 January 1949, through a letter signed on behalf of Foreign Minister Robert Schuman. France granted recognition to Israel de jure on 20 May 1949. The Palestinian Authority acknowledged France's rights to the lands encompassing this domain in 1997, following discussions.

According to Frédéric Encel, a geopolitical specialist in the Israeli–Palestinian conflict, "a police officer or armed soldier from another country cannot enter [French-owned sites] without the approval of the French consulate." However, Gérard Araud, a former French ambassador to Israel, clarified that these properties do not constitute "diplomatic premises" under the Vienna Convention, unlike a consulate.

== Incidents ==
On 22 October 1996, an incident occurred during an official visit by Jacques Chirac, president of France, to Jerusalem. Israeli soldiers were present within the Church of Saint Anne. In response, Chirac famously stated, "I don't want people with arms in France". This incident is often confused with another event that took place the same day, though it was unrelated to Israeli presence on French property. On 22 January 2020, a similar incident occurred during a visit by Emmanuel Macron.

On 7 November 2024, as French Foreign Minister Jean-Noël Barrot was preparing to visit the site, Israeli police entered the Church of Saint Anne while armed and arrested two gendarmes from the French Consulate in Jerusalem despite their diplomatic status. As a result of this, the Israeli ambassador to Paris was summoned on 12 November 2024.
