= Church of Saint Anne, Jerusalem =

Church in East Jerusalem

Church of Saint Anne
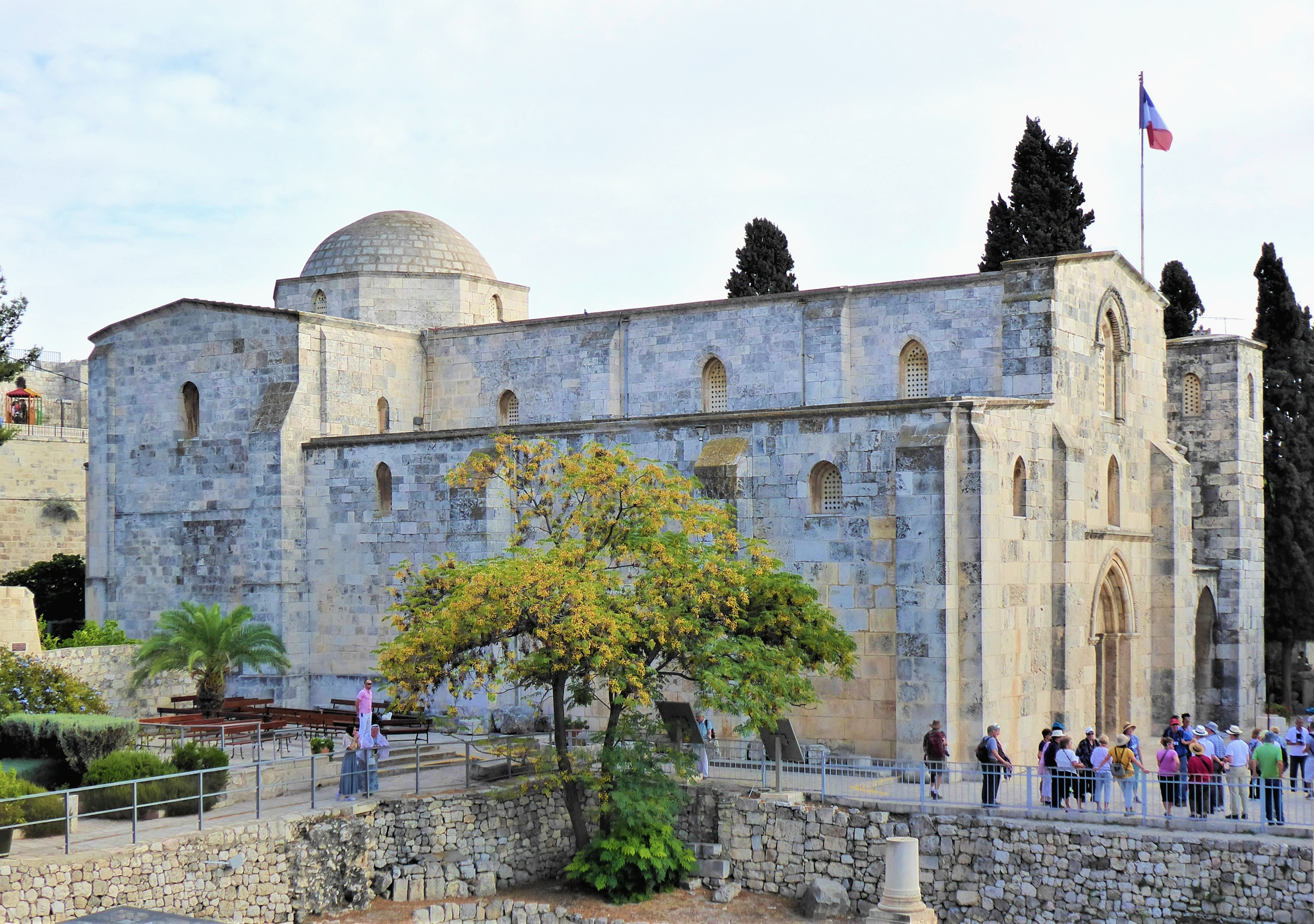
- Church of Saint Anne, 2019
- Church of Saint Anne
- 31°46′53″N 35°14′12″E
- Location: Old City of Jerusalem
- Address: 19 Lions’ Gate Street
- Country: Disputed between Israel and Palestine, state property of France (Note: The French state owns multiple religious properties in East Jerusalem under historical religious and diplomatic duties to protect Christian sites in the Holy Land. The official stance of France is for a two-state solution and has advocated for corpus separatum for the city of Jerusalem. This property is held under extraterritoriality but it is not sovereign land or a territorial possession of France.)
- Denomination: Catholic
- Religious institute: White Fathers
- Website: https://ste-anne-jerusalem.org/en/

History
- Status: Active

Architecture
- Completed: 12th century

Specifications
- Materials: Stone

The Church of Saint Anne (French: Église Sainte-Anne, Latin: Ecclesia S. Anna, Arabic: كنيسة القديسة حنة, Hebrew: כנסיית סנטה אנה) is a French Catholic church and part of the French national domain in the Holy Land located in the Muslim Quarter of the Old City of Jerusalem, near the start of the Via Dolorosa, next to the Lions' Gate. The site is also known as al-Madrasa as-Salahiyya (Saladin's madrasa).

== History of the site ==
During the Roman period a pagan shrine for the cult of the god of healing (a syncretic mix between the Egyptian god Serapis and the Greek god Asclepius), stood on the grounds next to the two Pools of Bethesda.

A Byzantine basilica was built over the remains of the shrine in the 5th century. Partially destroyed by the Persians in 614, it was subsequently restored. Baldwin I, the first titled Crusader king of Jerusalem, banished his wife Arda to the old Benedictine convent which still existed here in 1104. A small Crusader church, the so-called Moustier, was then erected over the wall separating the northern and southern Pools of Bethesda, among the ruins of the Byzantine church.

The current Church of St Anne was built sometime between 1131 and 1138, during the reign of Queen Melisende. It was erected near the remains of the Byzantine basilica, over the site of a grotto believed by the Crusaders to be the childhood home of the Virgin Mary, mother of Jesus. It is dedicated to Anne and Joachim, the parents of Saint Mary, who according to tradition lived here.

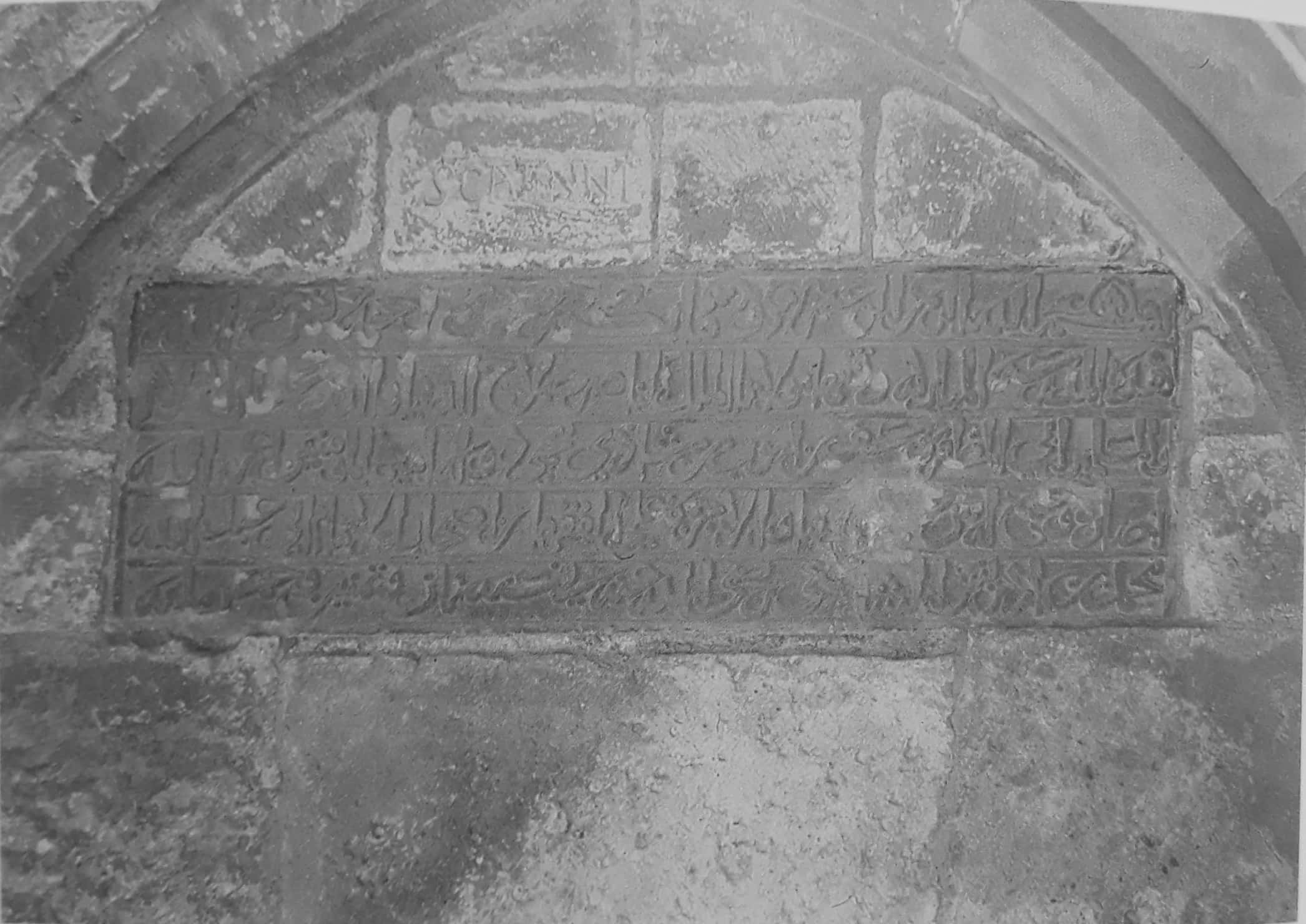
Stone inscription in Arabic located at the entrance of the Salahiyya Madrasa.

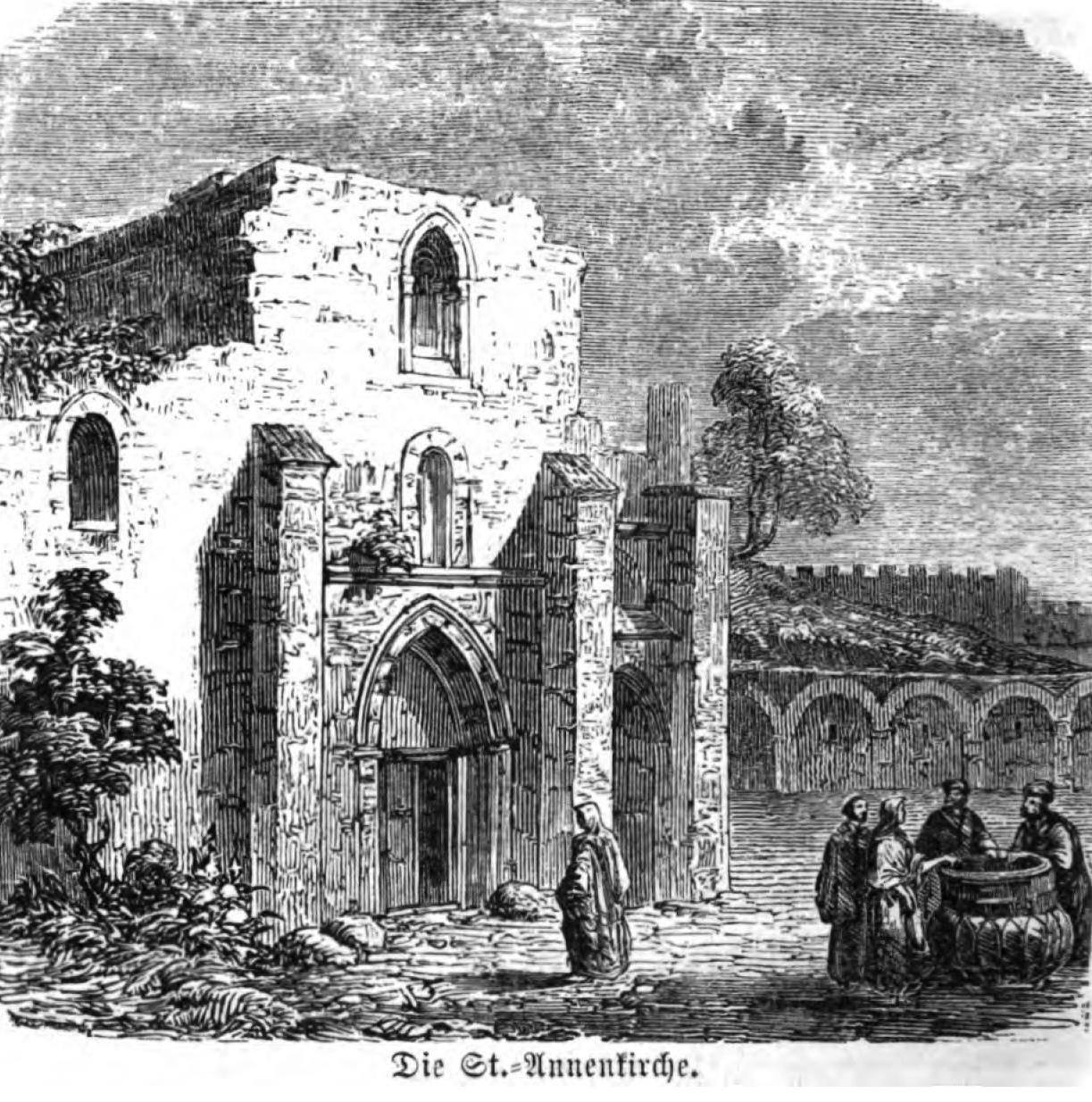
1862, Philipp Wolff.

Unlike many other Crusader churches, St. Anne's was not destroyed after the 1187 conquest of Jerusalem by Saladin (Ṣalāḥ ad-Dīn). In 1192, Ṣalāḥ ad-Dīn converted the building into a madrasa (Islamic educational institution), known as al-Madrasa as-Salahiyya (of Saladin), as is still written in the Arabic inscription above the entrance. In the 15th century it was considered as the most prestigious college in the city, counting among its more prominent students the Islamic jurist and city historian, Mujir al-Din (1456–1522).

During Muslim Ottoman rule in Palestine, Christian pilgrims were only permitted inside the grotto after paying a fee. Eventually the madrasa was abandoned and the former church building fell into disrepair. In 1856, in gratitude for French support during the Crimean War, the Ottoman sultan Abdülmecid I presented it to Napoleon III.

In 1862, the French government dispatched the architect Christophe-Edouard Mauss to Jerusalem for this purpose. In 1873, while working on the renovations, Mauss discovered the vestiges of the Bethesda Pool next to the church.

Since 1878, it has been administered by the Missionaries of Africa, a Catholic order, commonly called the "White Fathers" for the colour of their robes. Between 1882 and 1946 the site has housed a seminary for the training of Greek-Catholic priests.

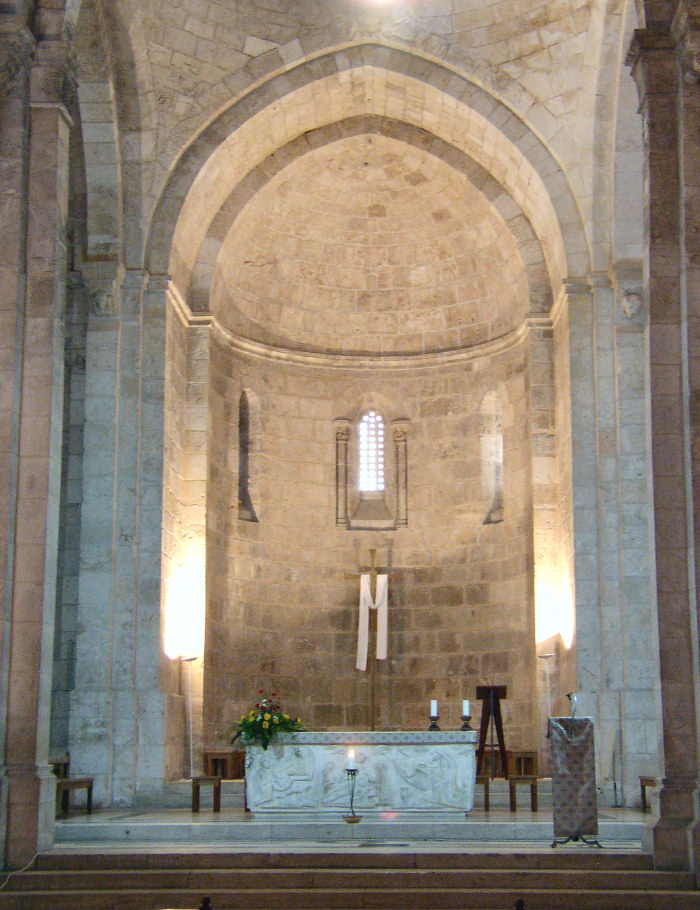
Central apse with main altar

== Design and construction ==
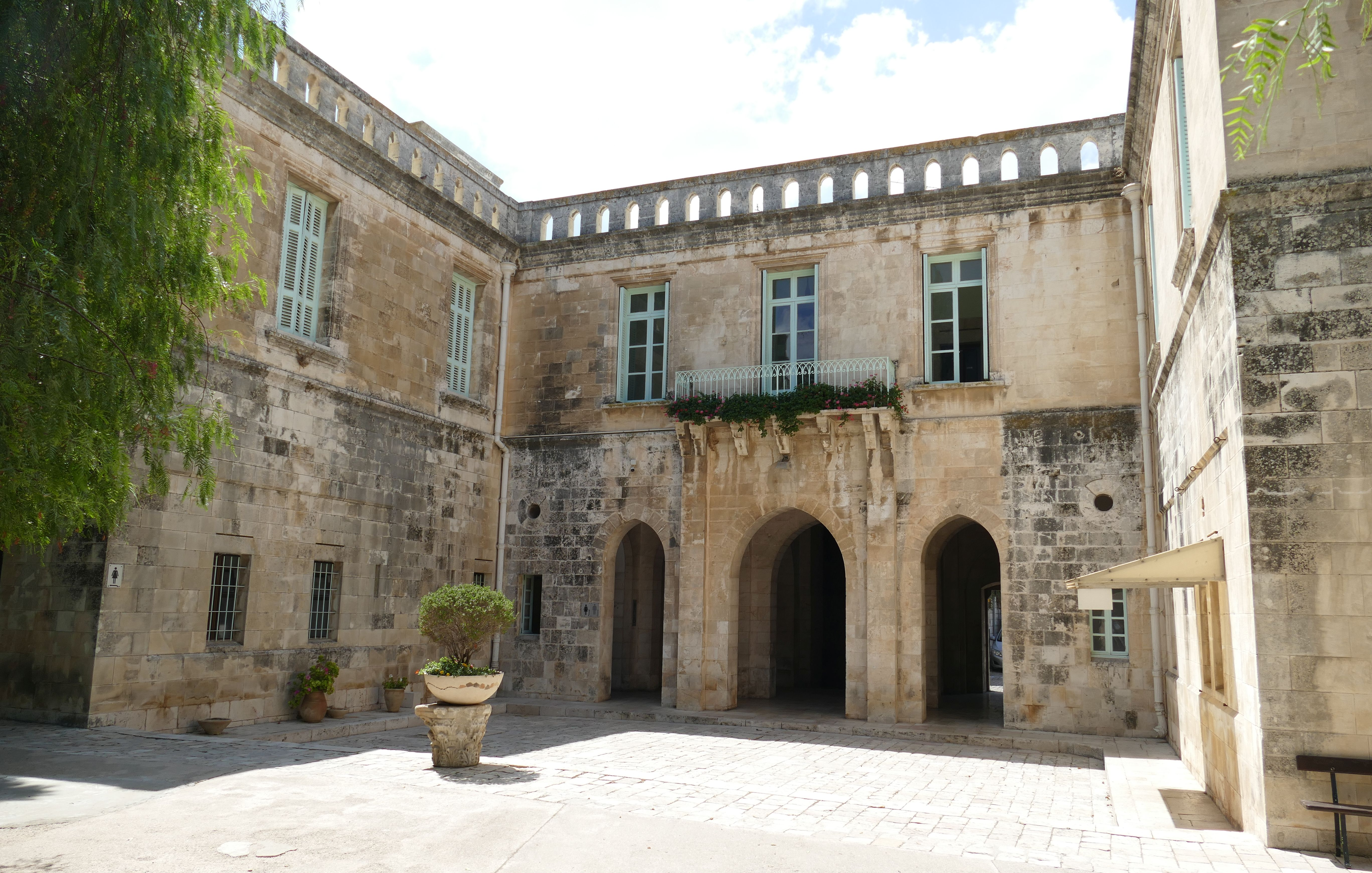
Church courtyard

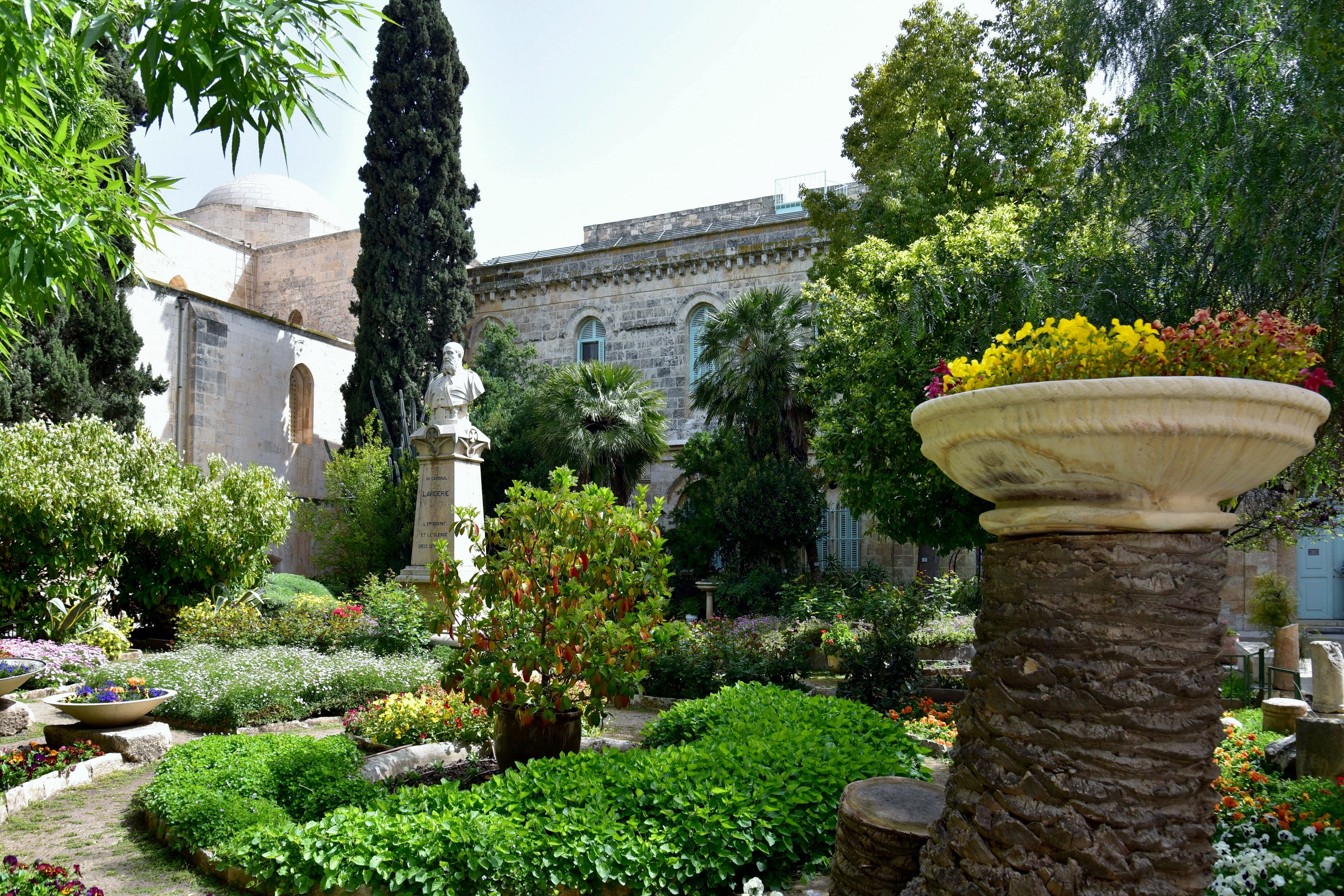
Courtyard and garden

Built between 1131 and 1138 to replace a previous Byzantine church, and shortly thereafter enlarged by several meters, the church is an excellent example of Romanesque architecture. The three-aisled basilica incorporates cross-vaulted ceilings and pillars, clear clean lines and a somewhat unadorned interior. The nave is separated from the lower lateral aisles by arcades of arches. The high altar, designed by the French sculptor Philippe Kaeppelin incorporates many different scenes. On the front of the altar are depicted the Nativity (left), the Descent from the Cross (center) and the Annunciation (right); on the left-hand end is the teaching of Mary by her mother, on the right-hand end her presentation in the Temple. In the south aisle is a flight of steps leading down to the crypt, in a grotto believed by the Crusaders to be Mary's birthplace. An altar dedicated to Mary is located there. The Byzantine basilica was partly stretched over two water basins, collectively known as the Pools of Bethesda, and built upon a series of piers, one of which still stands today in its entirety.

In 1862, the French architect Christophe-Edouard Mauss was dispatched by his government to Jerusalem with the special assignment of restoring the time-damaged church.

== Acoustics ==
The church's acoustics are particularly suited to Gregorian chant, which makes it a pilgrimage site for soloists and choirs.

== Property ==
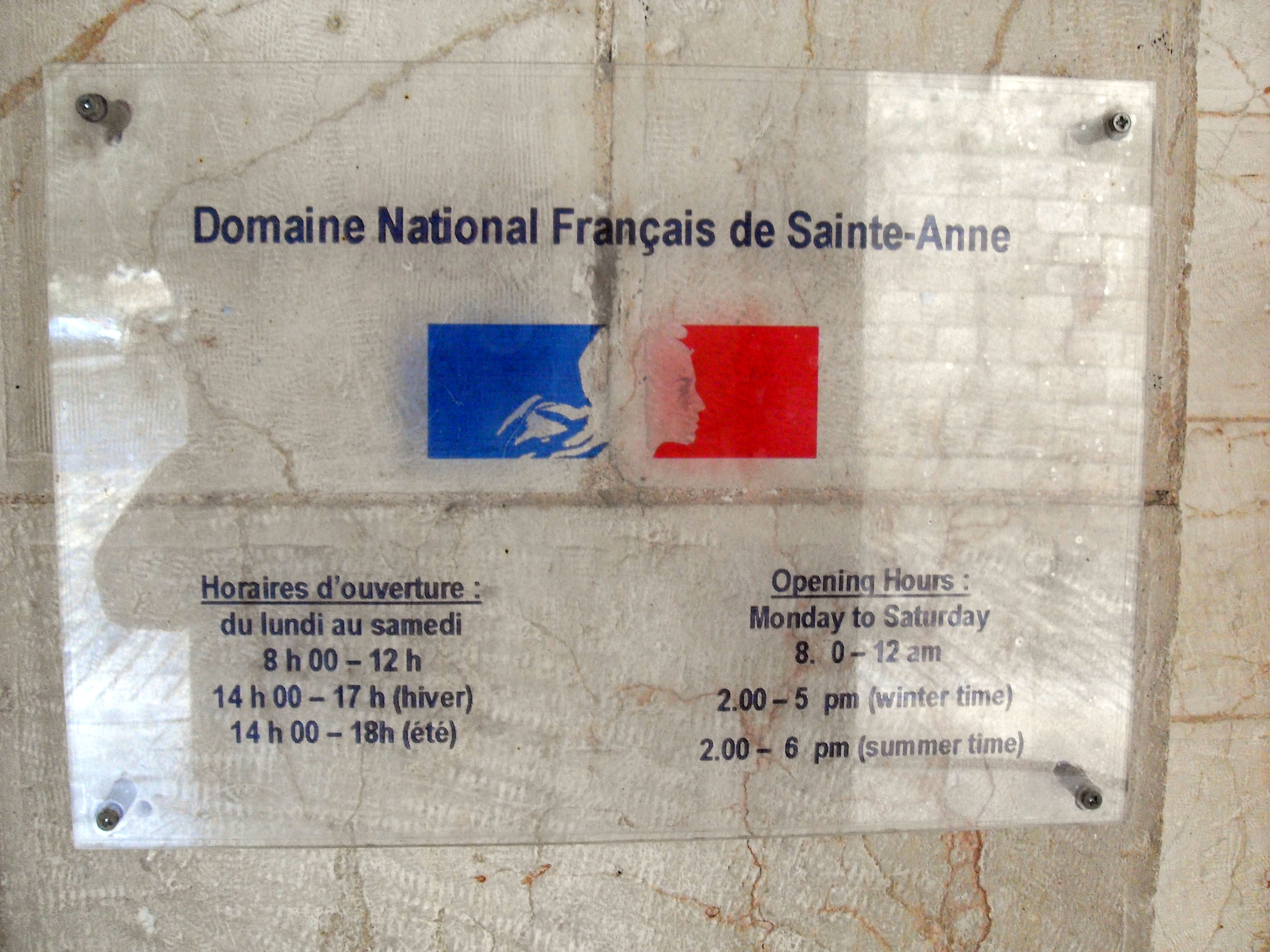
Sign listing the church as a "national domain" of France

The church is listed as one of four French government properties in the Holy Land as part of the French national domain in the Holy Land. In line with international law, which treats East Jerusalem as occupied territory, France does not recognize Israeli sovereignty over East Jerusalem, where the Church of Saint Anne is located. In 1996, during Jacques Chirac's visit to Jerusalem, the French president refused to enter the church until Israeli soldiers who accompanied him left. Similarly in January 2020, French President Emmanuel Macron was involved in an altercation with Israeli security officers at the church.

== See also ==
- High medieval domes

== Bibliography ==
- Clermont-Ganneau, C.S. (1899). [ARP] Archaeological Researches in Palestine 1873-1874, translated from the French by J. McFarlane. Vol. 1. London: Palestine Exploration Fund. (pp. 116 - 126)
- Fabri, F. (1896). Felix Fabri (circa 1480–1483 A.D.) vol I, part II. Palestine Pilgrims' Text Society. (pp. 455, 483)
- Moudjir ed-dyn (1876). Sauvaire (ed.). Histoire de Jérusalem et d'Hébron depuis Abraham jusqu'à la fin du XVe siècle de J.-C. : fragments de la Chronique de Moudjir-ed-dyn. (pp. 77, 82, 154-5)
- Pococke, R. (1745). A description of the East, and some other countries. Vol. 2. London: Printed for the author, by W. Bowyer. (p. 14)
- Poloner, John (1894). John Poloner's description of the Holy Land (ca. A.D. 1421). Palestine Pilgrims' Text Society. (p. 6)
- Pringle, D. (2007). The Churches of the Crusader Kingdom of Jerusalem: The city of Jerusalem. Vol. III. Cambridge University Press. ISBN 978-0-521-39038-5. (pp. 142- 156)
- Vogüé, de, M. (1860). Les églises de la Terre Sainte.(p. 233-245; pl. XIV-XXV)
- Warren, C.; Conder, C.R. (1884). The Survey of Western Palestine: Jerusalem. London: Committee of the Palestine Exploration Fund. (pp. 40, 83, 428)
