= Protectorate of missions =

Historical right exercised by Catholic powers over foreign missions

Protectorate of missions is a term for the right of protection exercised by a Christian power in a Muslim or other non-Christian country with regard to the persons and establishments of the missionaries. The term does not apply to all protection of missions, but only to that permanently exercised in virtue of an acquired right, usually established by a treaty or convention (either explicit or tacit), voluntarily consented to or accepted by the non-Christian power after some amount of compulsion. The object of the protectorate may vary in its extent, as it may embrace only the missionaries who are subjects of the protecting power or apply to the missionaries of all nations or even to the native Christians who are their recent converts.

== Background ==
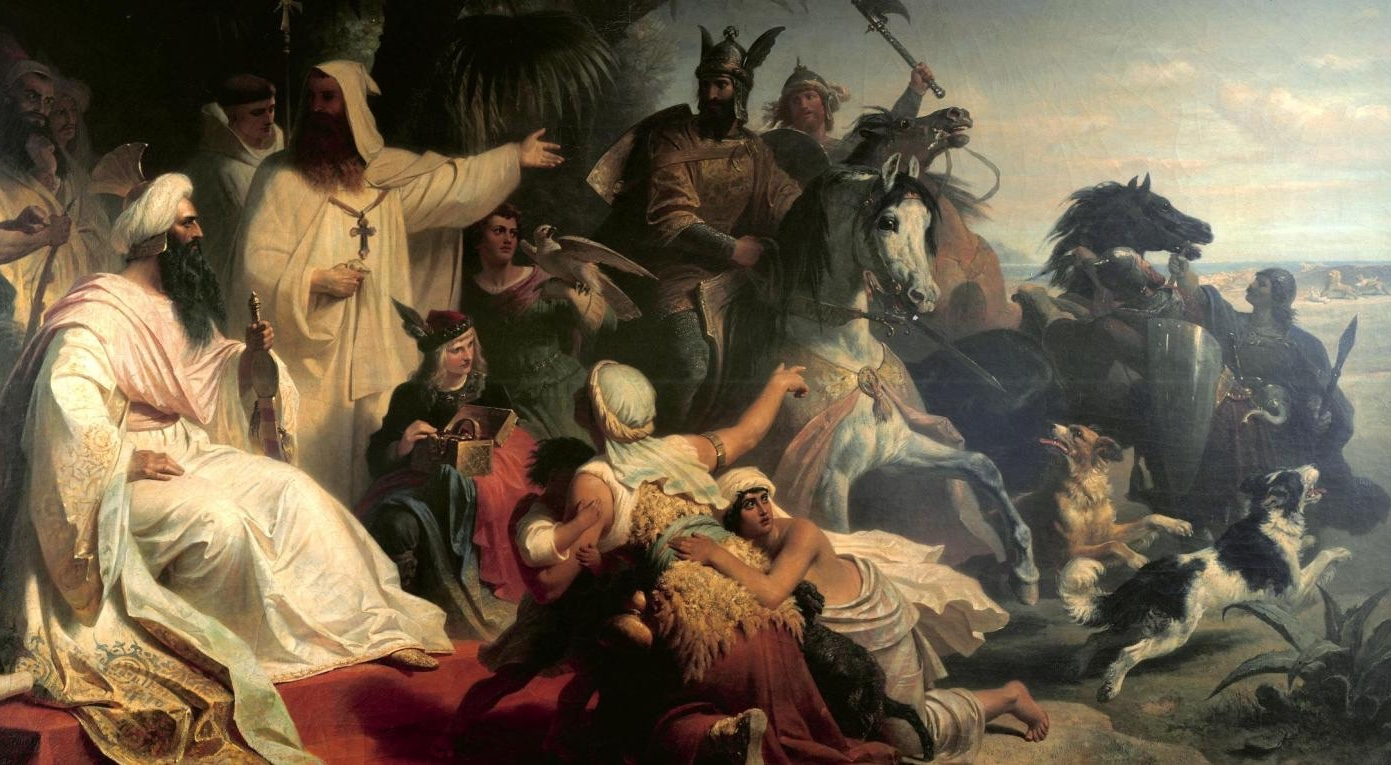
Harun al-Rashid at left receiving a delegation sent by Charlemagne to his court in Baghdad. 1864 painting by Julius Köckert.

Both Einhard and Notker the Stammerer refer to envoys traveling between the courts of Charlemagne, king of the Franks, and Harun al-Rashid. They mention the exchange of gifts and friendly discussions about Christian access to holy sites. This exchange of embassies was due to the fact that they both were interested in subduing the Umayyad emirs of Córdoba. Charlemagne and his successors made use of any concessions to establish pious and charitable foundations there, to protect the Christian inhabitants and pilgrims, and to ensure the availability of Christian worship.

The destruction of the Arab Empire by the Turks put an end to this first protectorate, and for reasons that were not purely religious, led to the Crusades, as a result of which Palestine was conquered from the Saracens and became a Latin, French-speaking kingdom. The Christian rule was later replaced by that of Islam, but during the three centuries of Crusades, which had been undertaken and supported mainly by France, the Christians of the East had grown accustomed to look to that country for assistance in oppression or to gain more leverage in their dealings with the Ottomans, while France valued its increasingly important role in the region and its accompanying geopolitical benefits.

== France in the Levant ==
The protectorate began to assume a contractual form in the sixteenth century, in the treaties concluded between the kings of France and the Ottoman Sultans, which are historically known as Capitulations. At first this name designated the commercial agreement conceded by the Sublime Porte to Latin merchants (first to Italians, starting with Genoese in 1453), and arose from the fact that the articles of these agreements were called capitoli ('chapters' in the Italian redaction).

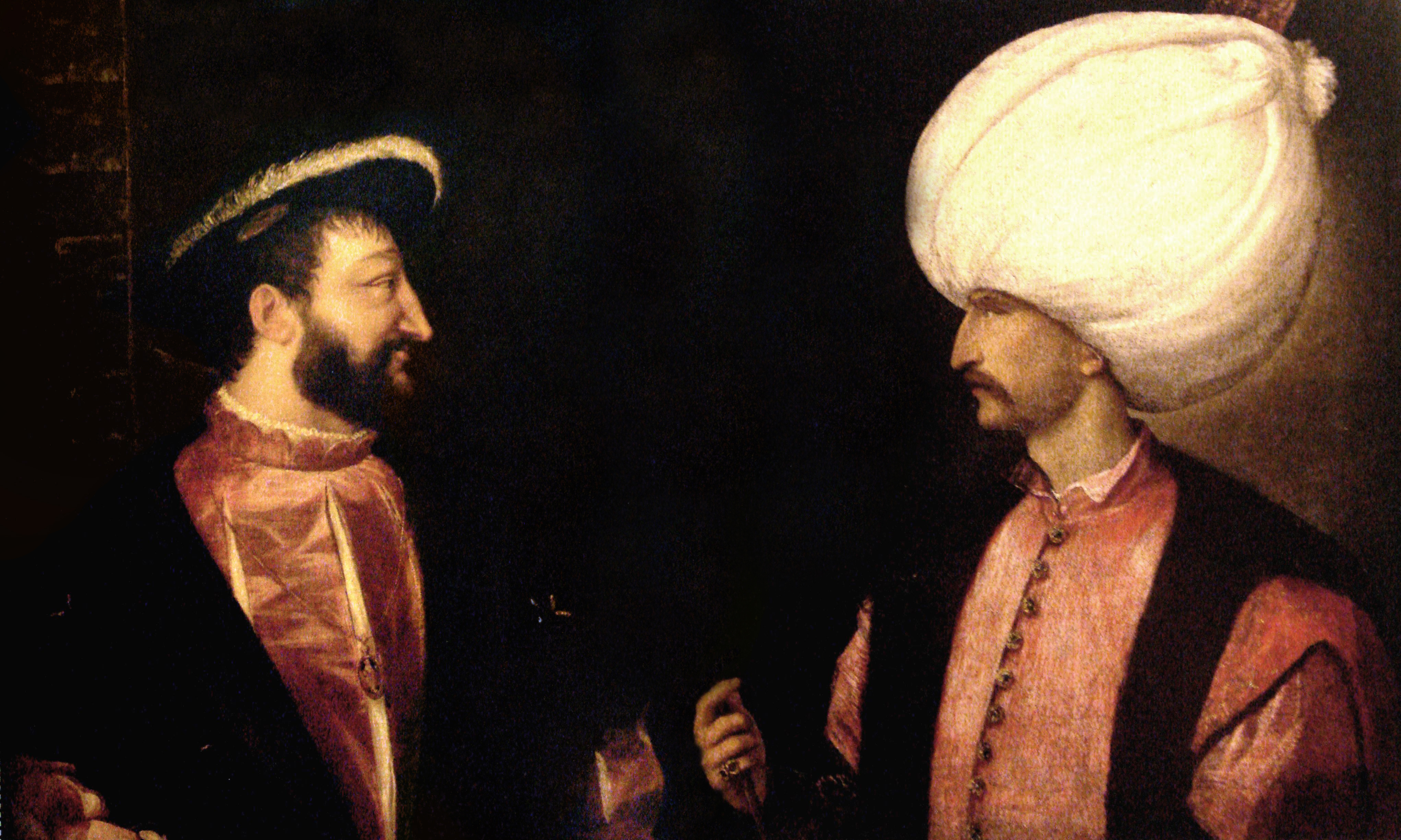
Francis I (left) and Suleiman the Magnificent (right) initiated a Franco-Ottoman alliance. Both were separately painted by Titian c. 1530.

Francis I was the first king of France who sought an alliance with the Ottomans. The pretext used by Francis was the protection of the Christians in Ottoman lands. The objective was to find an ally against the House of Habsburg. By compelling Austria to spend its forces in defense against the Ottomans in the East, he hoped to weaken it and render it unable to maintain its power in the West.

As early as 1528, Francis I had appealed to Suleiman the Magnificent to restore to the Christians of Jerusalem a church which the Ottomans had converted into a mosque. The Sultan refused on the plea that his religion would not permit alteration of the purpose of a mosque, but he promised to maintain the Christians in possession of all the other places occupied by them and to defend them against all oppression. The Franco-Ottoman alliance caused quite a scandal in the Christian world, but endured for many years, since it served the objective interests of both parties.

Henry IV continued the policy of a Franco-Ottoman alliance and received an embassy from Sultan Mehmed III in 1601. In 1604, a "Peace Treaty and Capitulation" was signed between Henry IV and the Ottoman Sultan Ahmed I. It granted numerous advantages to France in the Ottoman Empire. The capitulations were made to entice and encourage commercial exchange with Western merchants. According to their terms traders entering the Ottoman Empire were exempt from local prosecution, local taxation, local conscription, and the searching of their domicile. Ahmed expanded the capitulations given to France, specifying that merchants from Spain, Ragusa, Genoa, Ancona and Florence could trade under the French flag. In the capitulations of 20 May 1604 appear two clauses relative to the protection of pilgrims and of the religious in charge of the Church of the Holy Sepulchre in consideration of and for the honor and friendship of the French king.

The result of this friendship was the development of the Catholic missions, which began to flourish through the assistance of Henry IV and his son Louis XIII, who introduced the system of capitulations to Morocco. The Franco-Moroccan Treaty (1631) gave France preferential tariffs, the establishment of a Consulate and freedom of religion for French subjects. Before the middle of the seventeenth century, various religious orders (Capuchin, Carmelite, Dominican, Franciscan and Jesuit) were established, as chaplains of the French ambassadors and consuls, in major Ottoman cities (Istanbul, Alexandria, Smyrna, Aleppo, Damascus, etc.), Lebanon and the islands of the Aegean Archipelago. They assembled the Catholics to instruct and confirm them in the Catholic faith, opened schools to which flocked the children of all rites, relieved the spiritual and corporal miseries of the Christians in the Turkish prisons, and nursed the pest-stricken, which last office made many martyrs of charity.

French influence reached its peak during the reign of Louis XIV, whose prestige, due to his victories and conquests, was significant at the Porte. Louis XIV gave the missionaries material and moral support. Thanks to him, the often precarious tolerance, on which the existence of the missions had previously depended, was officially recognized in 1673, when on 5 June, Mehmed IV not only confirmed the earlier capitulations guaranteeing the safety of pilgrims and the religious guardians of the Holy Sepulchre, but signed four new articles, all beneficial to the missionaries. The decrees secured the tranquil possession of their churches, explicitly to the Jesuits and Capuchins, and in general "to the French at Smyrna, Saïd, Alexandria, and in all other ports of the Ottoman Empire".

The reign of Louis XIV marked the apogee of the French Protectorate in the East, for not only the Latin missionaries of all nationalities, but also the heads of all Catholic communities, regardless of rite or nationality, appealed to the king, and at the recommendation of his ambassadors and consuls to the Porte and the pashas, obtained justice and protection.

In 1740 the French succeeded in securing the renewal of the capitulations, with additions which explicitly confirmed the right of the French Protectorate. By the eighty-seventh of the articles signed on 28 May 1740, Sultan Mahmud I declared: "...The bishops and religious subject to the Emperor of France living in my empire shall be protected while they confine themselves to the exercise of their office, and no one may prevent them from practicing their rite according to their custom in the churches in their possession, as well as in the other places they inhabit."

In subsequent treaties between France and Turkey, the capitulations were not repeated verbatim, but they are recalled and confirmed (e. g. in 1802 and 1838). The various regimes which succeeded the monarchy of Louis IX of France and of Louis XIV all maintained in law, and in fact, the ancient privilege of France in the protection of the missionaries and Christian communities of the Orient.

In 1860 conflict broke out between the local Druze and Christians at Mount Lebanon. The unrest spread leading to riots and mob violence which devastated the Christian quarter of Damascus. Following the massacres and an international outcry, the Ottoman Empire agreed on 3 August 1860 to the dispatch of up to 12,000 European soldiers to reestablish order. France, under Emperor Napoleon III supplied half.

== The Far East ==
Beginning in the 15th century, popes granted to the Crown of Portugal the right to designate candidates for the sees and ecclesiastical benefices in the vast domains acquired through the expeditions it sponsored in Africa and the East Indies. This is sometimes called the Portuguese Protectorate of Missions, but more properly the "Portuguese Patronage" (Padroado). It allowed the King of Portugal to benefit from a certain portion of the ecclesiastical revenues of his kingdom, and it carried the condition that he should send good missionaries to his new subjects, and that he should provide with a fitting endowment the dioceses, parishes and religious establishments established in his acquired territories. The Holy See contested Portugal's assertion of these rights to regions it claimed but never conquered, including the greater part of India, Tong-king, Cochin-China (both in present Vietnam), Siam and especially China. Portugal tried to exert influence through its ambassadors to China in the 18th century, instructing them to intervene as much as possible to protect missionaries and native Christians from ongoing persecution in the provinces.

Portugal's authority was not comparable to the protectorate regime exercised by France in the Near East or Far East in later centuries and Portugal's rights as protector were never recognized by a host nation. No Christian power exercised a protectorate in China before the 19th century.

=== France ===
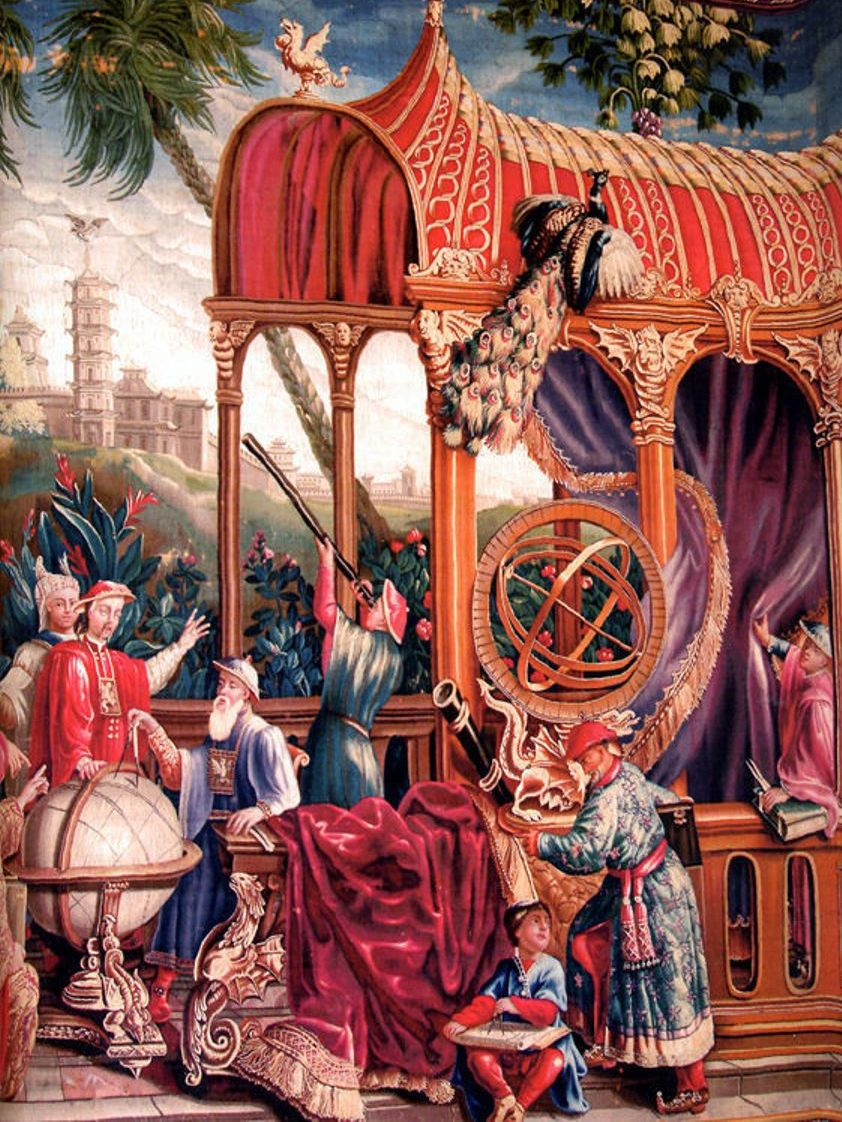
Jesuit astronomers with Kangxi Emperor

From approximately the 1840s through the 1920s (historical framings vary), France asserted a religious protectorate over the Catholic Church in China. It used the privileges it had extracted from the Qing dynasty in the unequal treaties following the Opium Wars to obtain privileges and benefits for Catholic missionaries operating in China. With these privileges, France established a role in providing Catholic missionaries with access to China's interior, providing French extraterritoriality over missionaries, and providing a mechanism through which foreign missionaries could seek French judicial intervention on behalf of Chinese Catholics, to the exclusion of Chinese legal authorities. France used its religious protectorate as a means to assert its diplomatic interests and standing.

France's religious protectorate in China also created tensions with the Holy See. France blocked attempts by several Popes to establish bilateral relations with China. In 1919, Pope Pius XI issued the encyclical Maximum Illud which supported the increased localisation of the Catholic Church in China. Some missionary societies ignored the encyclical and in 1922, Pius XI sent Celso Benigno Luigi Costantini to China as an apostolic delegate to implement it. One historical view deems Constantini's arrival in China as the end of the French religious protectorate.

== Other countries ==
=== Germany ===
In 1875, at the time of the negotiations between France and (nominally Ottoman) Egypt with regard to judiciary reform, the German government declared that it "recognized no exclusive right of protection of any power in behalf of Catholic establishments in the East, and that it reserved its rights with regard to German subjects belonging to any of these establishments". Against French claims to an exclusive protectorate and in support of its own claims to exercise the privileges of a protectorate, Germany later cited the language agreed to by Austria-Hungary, France, Germany, Great Britain, Italy, Russia, and the Ottoman Empire in article 62 of the Treaty of Berlin in 1878: "Ecclesiastics, pilgrims and monks of all nationalities traveling in Turkey in Europe or Turkey in Asia shall enjoy the same rights, advantages and privileges. The official right of protection of the diplomatic and consular agents of the Powers in Turkey is recognized, with regard both to the above-mentioned persons and to their religious, charitable and other establishments in the Holy Places and elsewhere." The passage immediately following this paragraph in the article was overlooked: "The acquired rights of France are explicitly reserved, and there shall be no interference with the statu quo in the Holy Places." Thus the protection guaranteed to all ecclesiastics, etc., no matter what their nationality or religion, as well as the generally recognized right of all the powers to watch over this protection, was to be understood with the reservation of the "acquired rights" of France, i.e. of its ancient protectorate in behalf of Catholics. This protectorate was therefore really confirmed by the Treaty of Berlin.

But as a matter of fact, the influence of Russia, which assumed the protectorate of Orthodox Christians, already greatly affected the standing which the ancient French Protectorate had assured to Catholics in Palestine and especially in Jerusalem.

Moreover, Emperor Wilhelm II of Germany installed Protestantism with a magnificent church beside the Holy Sepulchre in 1898. As a sort of compensation he ceded to German Catholics the site of the Dormition of the Blessed Virgin which he obtained from the Sultan, where a church and a monastery were erected and, together with the other German establishments, placed under the protection of the German Empire, without deference to the ancient prerogative of France.

A similar situation prevailed in China. First, in 1888, Germany obtained from the Chinese imperial Government that German passports should insure the same advantages to the missionaries as those secured at the French legation. At the same time the German Catholic missionaries of Shandong, who had much to endure from the infidels, were on several occasions offered the powerful protection of the German Empire. Anzer, the vicar Apostolic, decided to accept it, after having, as he declares, several times sought unsuccessfully the aid of the French minister. In 1896 the German ambassador at Peking received from Berlin the command to support energetically the claims of the Catholic missionaries and even to declare that the German Empire would pledge itself to defend against all unjust oppression the persons and property of the mission of Shandong, together with freedom of preaching, in the same measure in which such had been formerly guaranteed by the French Protectorate. The murder of two of the Shandong missionaries in November 1897 afforded the occasion for a more solemn affirmation of the new protectorate, while it furnished a long-sought pretext for the occupation of the Jiaozhou Bay area.

=== Austria ===
Austria concluded various treaties with the Ottoman Empire in 1699 (Treaty of Karlowitz), 1718 (Treaty of Passarowitz), and 1739 (Treaty of Belgrade) that secured a right of protection over "the religious" in the Empire and even at Jerusalem, though never including a guarantee of liberty of worship. Austria never exercised authority as a protector except in the countries bordering on Habsburg Austria, notably Albania and Macedonia. In 1848 the Austrian Protectorate was extended to the Christian missions in the Sudan and Nigritia, which were in the care of Austrian priests. When the Coptic Catholic hierarchy was restored in Egypt by Pope Leo XIII in 1895, the new patriarch and his suffragans placed themselves under the protection of Austria.

== Position of the Holy See ==
The Holy See defended the French Protectorate on several occasions. Whenever missionaries sought protection from any other country, the French diplomatic corps complained to Rome, and the Congregation for the Propagation of the Faith reprimanded the missionaries and reminded them that France had the sole right to safeguard their interests in non-Christian nations. This happened in 1744 and 1844. Italy sought to establish its own protectorate by patronizing missionary activities and winning the allegiance of those it supported, but the Congregation for the Propagation of the Faith refused to support its efforts. Instead, on 22 May 1888, the Congregation wrote to the Italian missionaries in the Levant and the Far East to remind them that "the Protectorate of the French Nation in the countries of the East has been established for centuries and sanctioned even by treaties between the empires. Therefore, there must be absolutely no innovation in this matter; this protectorate, wherever it is in force, is to be religiously preserved, and the missionaries are warned that, if they have need of any help, they are to have recourse to the consuls and other ministers of France." On 1 August 1898, Pope Leo XIII wrote to Cardinal Benoît-Marie Langénieux, Archbishop of Reims:

France has a special mission in the East confided to her by Providence—a noble mission consecrated not alone by ancient usage, but also by international treaties.... The Holy See does not wish to interfere with the glorious patrimony which France has received from its ancestors and which beyond a doubt it means to deserve by always showing itself equal to its task.

In parallel with this recognition of French exclusivity, the Holy See declined to establish its own diplomatic relations with Turkey and China, even when supported by those governments. Leo XIII rejected any proposal to exchange legates or ambassadors at the instance of French diplomats, who told him those countries had less interest in amicable relations with the Holy See than in evading the authorities granted to the French protectorate.

== Assessments ==
Critics of the protectorate said that the authorities that granted the privilege to a Christian nation did so under duress, that the system contributed to and exacerbated anti-Christian sentiment in those countries, and that it allowed Christian missionaries to disregard the sensibilities of the non-Christian population. Those who see benefits in the protectorate system contend that it was the best means of protecting missionaries and their activities and allow that it required that the foreign power minimize its meddling and exercise discretion in asserting its rights. As an example, one study noted that the superior of the mission of southeast Chi-li resolved its issues directly with local authorities and sought intervention from the French legation only three times during the difficult period from 1862 to 1884. They believed abuses were minimal, especially in comparison with the benefits.

== See also ==
- Christianity and colonialism
- Congregation for the Evangelization of Peoples
