= Kiryat Ye'arim =

Kiryat Ye'arim קִרְיַת יְעָרִים كريات يعاريم
- Local council

Hebrew transcription(s)
  - ISO 259: Qiryat Yˁarim
  - Also spelled: Kiryat Yearim (unofficial)
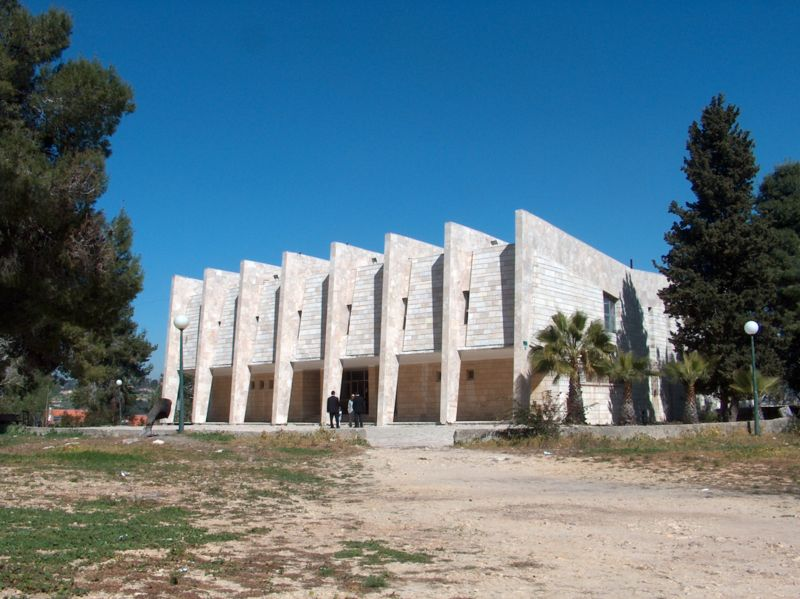
- Beth midrash in Kiryat Ye'arim

- Location within Jerusalem District Location within Israel
- Coordinates: 31°48′12″N 35°6′0″E
- Country: Israel
- District: Jerusalem
- Natural Region: Judean Mountains

Government
  - Head of Municipality: Yitzhak Ravitz

Population (2024)
  - Total: 7,839
- Name meaning: Town of forests

Kiryat Ye'arim (Hebrew: קִרְיַת יְעָרִים), also known as Telz-Stone, is a strictly Orthodox town in the Jerusalem District of Israel. It is located in the approximate area of an ancient place mentioned in the Bible, from which it takes its name. It is bordered on one side by the Muslim Arab village of Abu Ghosh, and on the other side by the secular Jewish community of Neve Ilan. In 2024 it had a population of 7,839.

== Names ==
=== Kiryat Ye'arim ===
For the official name, see Biblical connection section.

=== Telz-Stone ===
Despite the official name of "Kiryat Ye'arim", the town is widely known as Telz-Stone, after the Telshe or Telz yeshiva, who had a branch there between 1977 and 1979, and American Greetings founder-chairman Irving I. Stone, who helped to finance the community's early development.

== Geography ==
Kiryat Ye'arim is located approximately 10 kilometres (6.2 mi) west of Jerusalem, just north of the Tel Aviv – Jerusalem highway. Neighboring Kiryat Ye'arim to the northeast is the Arab town of Abu Ghosh. Kiryat Ye'arim is between 661.8 and 749.5 m (2,171 and 2,459 ft) above sea level.

== Biblical connection ==
The modern town of Kiryat Ye'arim (Town of Forests) is named for the homonymous ancient city (common English spelling: Kiriath-Jearim), mentioned in the Hebrew Bible as the site where the Ark of the Covenant was kept for 20 years, according to the Book of Samuel. From there the Ark was taken to Jerusalem by King David (I Chronicles 13, 5-8).

== History ==
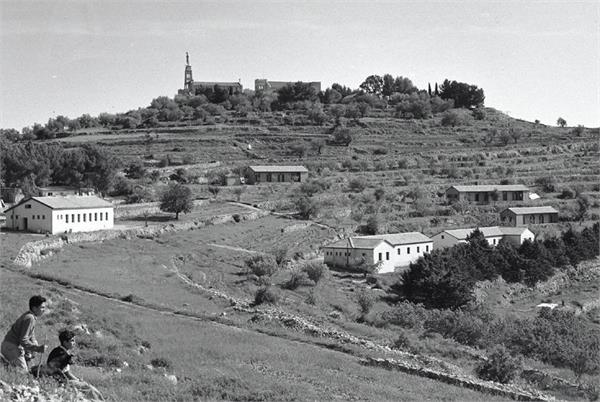
Kiryat Ye'arim in 1937, with the Church of Our Lady of the Ark of the Covenant on the hill behind. Photo by Abraham Malevsky.

Six hundred dunams of modern-day Kiryat Ye'arim were purchased before 1948 by Menashe Elissar, a businessman who was attracted to the site as the location of the biblical Kiryat Ye'arim.

The modern community was established in 1973 by American ultra-Orthodox Jews. A group of students and teachers of the American Telshe Yeshiva (Yeshivat Telz in Hebrew) were active there in 1977–79.

== Demography ==
According to the Israel Central Bureau of Statistics (CBS), at the end of 2019 Kiryat Ye'arim had a population of 6,309 predominantly Jewish residents. Many of the residents are immigrants from North America, Europe and South Africa.

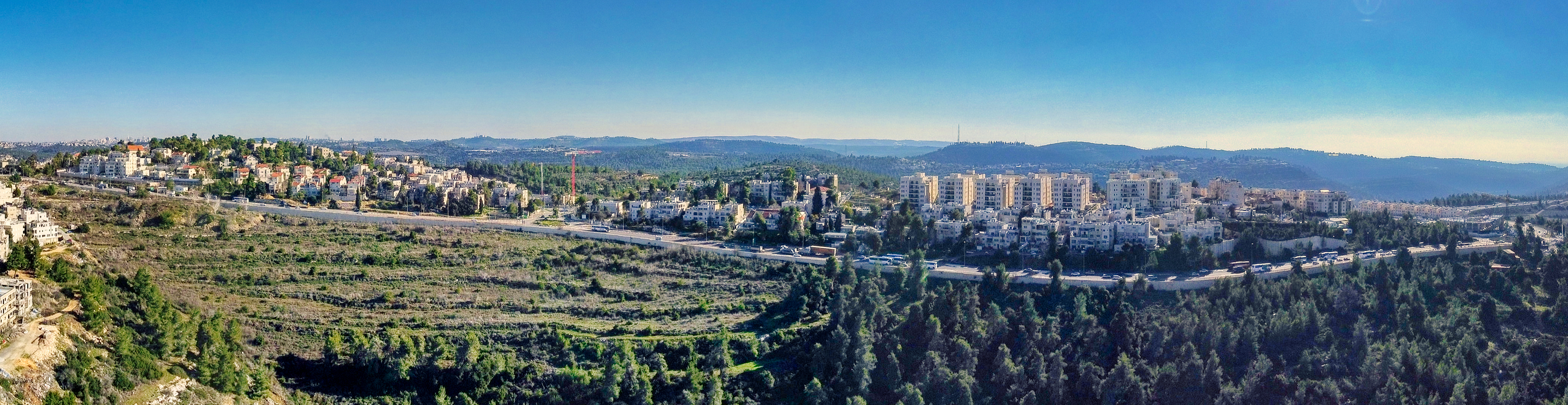
Kiryat Ye'arim 2022

== Institutions ==
Kiryat Ye'arim is home to three Orthodox post-high school yeshivas aimed at foreign students, particularly from the U.S.: Neveh Zion, Keser Dovid and Yishrei Lev.

It is also home to a Sephardic Haredi yeshiva - Be'er Yitzhak and another yeshiva: Me'orot Hatorah.

== Voting Patterns ==
In the 2022 election, 98 percent of voters in Kiryat Ye'arim voted for the parties of the right-wing coalition led by Benjamin Netanyahu, while 1 percent voted for the parties of the center-left coalition led by Yair Lapid and 0.04 percent voted for the Arab parties. 88 percent of voters voted for the Haredi parties Shas or UTJ.

In the 2026 election, 93 percent of voters in Kiryat Ye'arim voted for the parties of the right-wing coalition led by Benjamin Netanyahu, while 1.4 percent voted for the parties of the center-left coalition led by Gadi Eisenkot and 0.1 percent voted for the Arab parties. An additional 0.5 percent voted for Amcha Yisrael. 81 percent of voters voted for the Haredi parties Shas or UTJ. Voter turnout increased 15 percent from the 2022 election.
