= Yeshivas Neveh Zion =

Yeshivah on the outskirts of Jerusalem

Yeshivas Neveh Zion (Hebrew: ישיבת נוה ציון) is a yeshivah in Kiryat Ye'arim, on the outskirts of Jerusalem. It was originally founded by Rabbi Ben Zion Sobel in Moshav Beit Yehoshua before moving in 1982.

== Notable alumni ==
- David Draiman, musician, lead singer of Disturbed (band)
