= Our Lady of the Ark of the Covenant Church =

Coordinates: 31.8074°N 35.1031°E

- כנסיית גבירתנו של ארון הברית
- Église Notre-Dame-de-l'Arche-d'Alliance
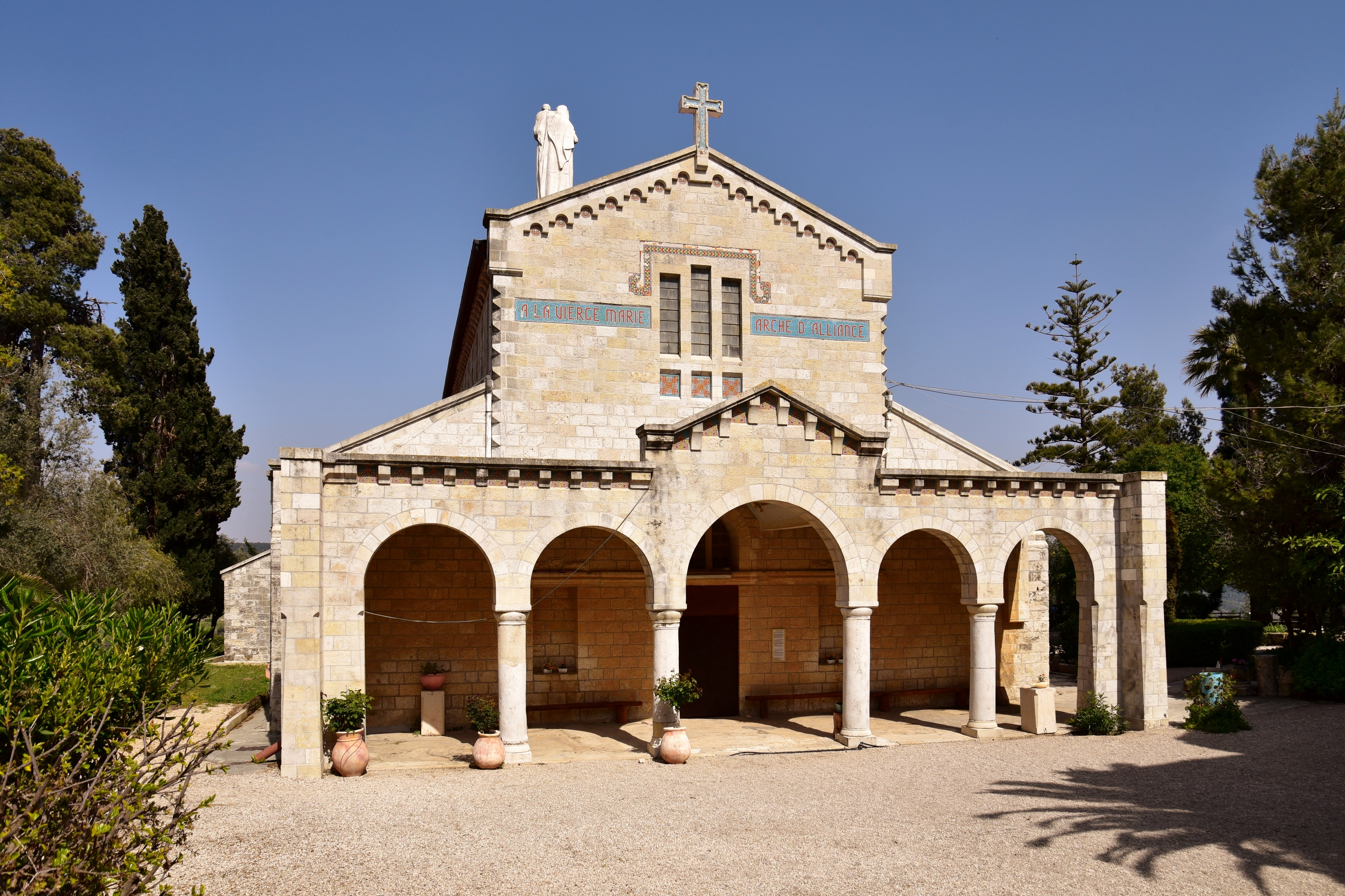
- Our Lady of the Ark of the Covenant Church
- Location: Abu Ghosh
- Country: Israel
- Denomination: Roman Catholic Church

The Our Lady of the Ark of the Covenant Church (Hebrew: כנסיית גבירתנו של ארון הברית, Founded in French: Église Notre-Dame-de-l'Arche-d'Alliance) is a religious building belonging to the Catholic Church and is located on the northwestern edge of the town of Abu Ghosh in the central Israel. The church is at an altitude of 756 meters above sea level.

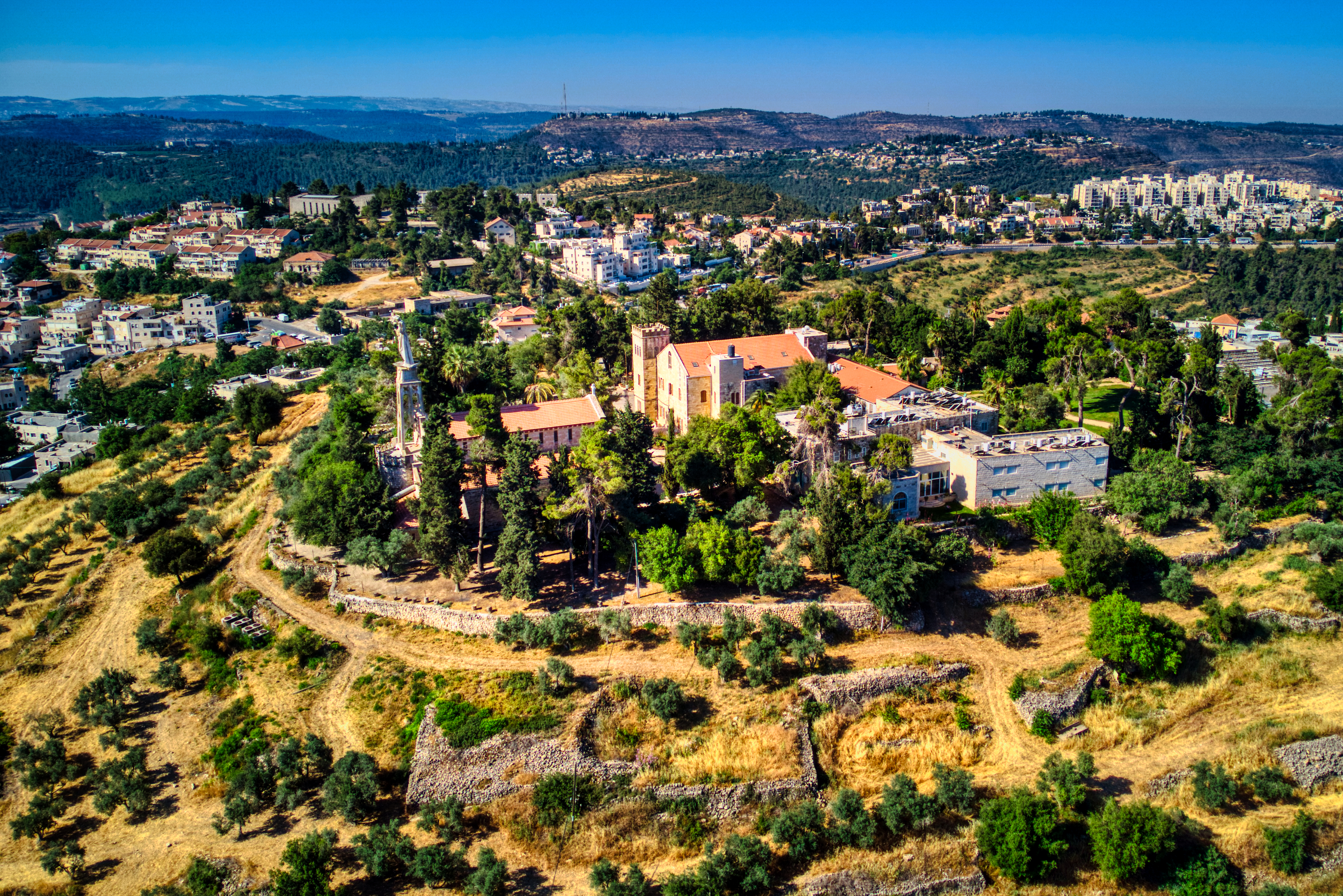
The church on top of Kiriath-Jearim

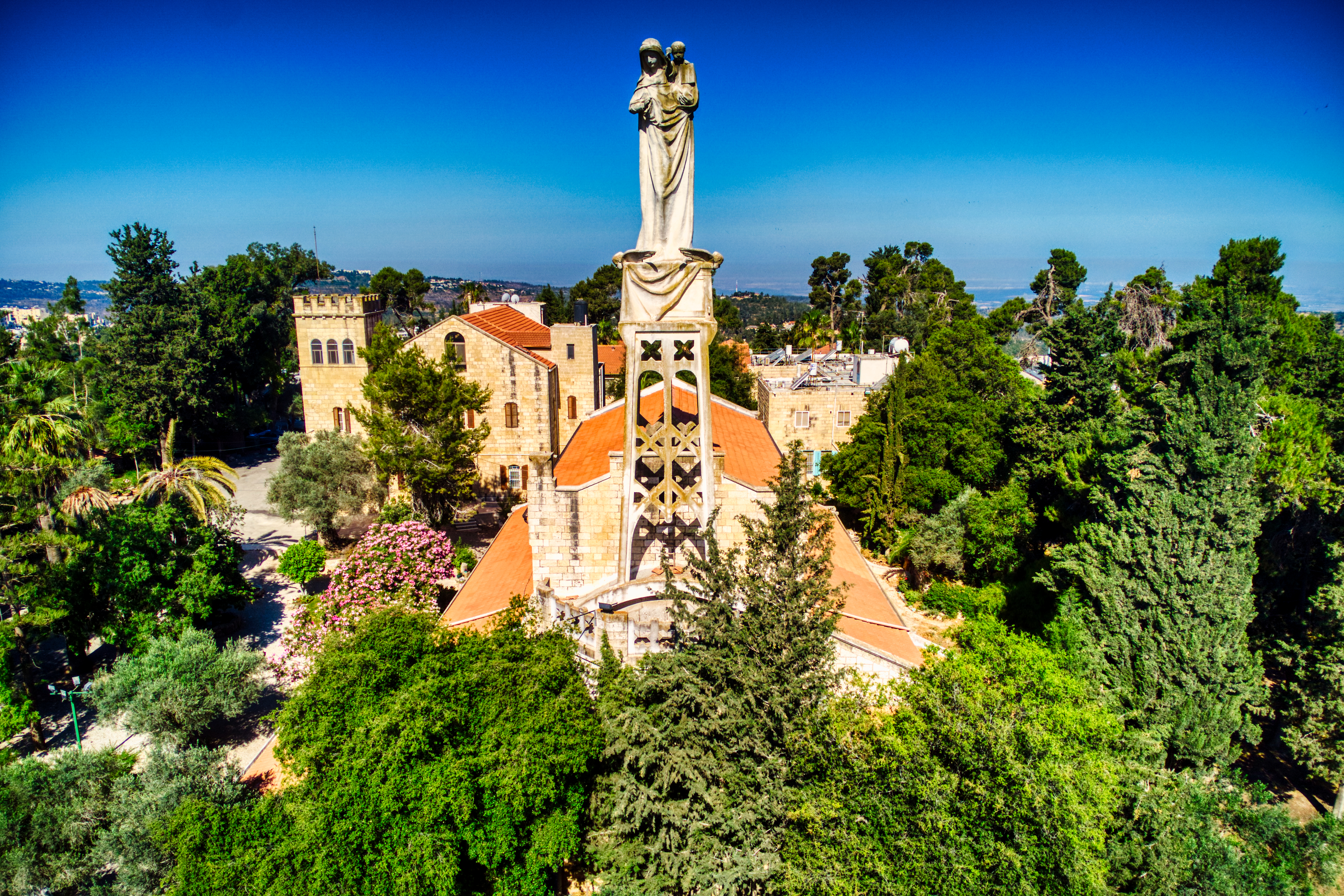
The statue of Madonna and Child

== Significance ==
In Christianity, Mary has been interpreted as the new and ultimate receptacle of God's covenant. In Catholicism, the Blessed Virgin Mary is identified as the "Ark of the New Covenant". Some of the Church Fathers reasoned that by having carried the saviour of mankind inside her womb, Mary herself had become the new Holy of Holies. For more see Ark of the Covenant: New Testament and replacement theology.

== History ==
In 1141, near the area where the village of Abu Ghosh is located, the Knights Hospitaller founded another church, about 400 meters east of the Church of Our Lady of the Ark of the Covenant (see Abu Ghosh: Abbey of St Mary of the Resurrection).

In 1924, a church was built at the traditional site of the house of Abinadab, where the Ark of the Covenant rested for twenty years, until King David took it to Jerusalem. It was built on the site of a previous Byzantine church of the fifth century. The modern church can be recognized from afar due to the statue of Mary carrying the baby Jesus in her arms, which towers over the roof. The interior is decorated with simplicity. Its walls are painted white, and the central apse has a large Latin cross.

The modern church was established by the Order of the Sisters of St. Joseph of the Apparition. In 2018, since the dedication of the statue of the Lady of La Vang in the garden, the church has become the meeting place of Vietnamese pilgrims. On-site activities include, besides religious services, music events of the ″Abu Ghosh Music Festival″.

== See also ==
- Resurrection Church, Abu Ghosh
- Church of Our Lady Mary of Zion
