= Jawdat Ibrahim =

Israeli Arab millionaire

Jawdat Ibrahim (Arabic: جودت ابراهيم, Hebrew: ג'וודאת איברהים) is an Israeli millionaire who has established a fund that gives scholarships to both Arab and Jewish university students, and has hosted informal peace talks between Israeli and Palestinian National Authority leaders at his popular Abu Ghosh restaurant. Ibrahim lived in Chicago for six years, but returned to Israel in 1992 after winning US$17.5 million in the Illinois State Lottery.

In 2010, Ibrahim funded a project to reclaim the Guinness World Record for the world's largest hummus from Lebanon in the Israeli Arab town of Abu Ghosh. The world record breaking hummus weighed 4,090 kg. The new record was described by Israel's Army Radio as the Third Lebanon War.
