= Church of the Resurrection, Abu Ghosh =

Coordinates: 31.8074°N 35.1075°E

Resurrection Church
- הכנסייה הצלבנית באבו גוש
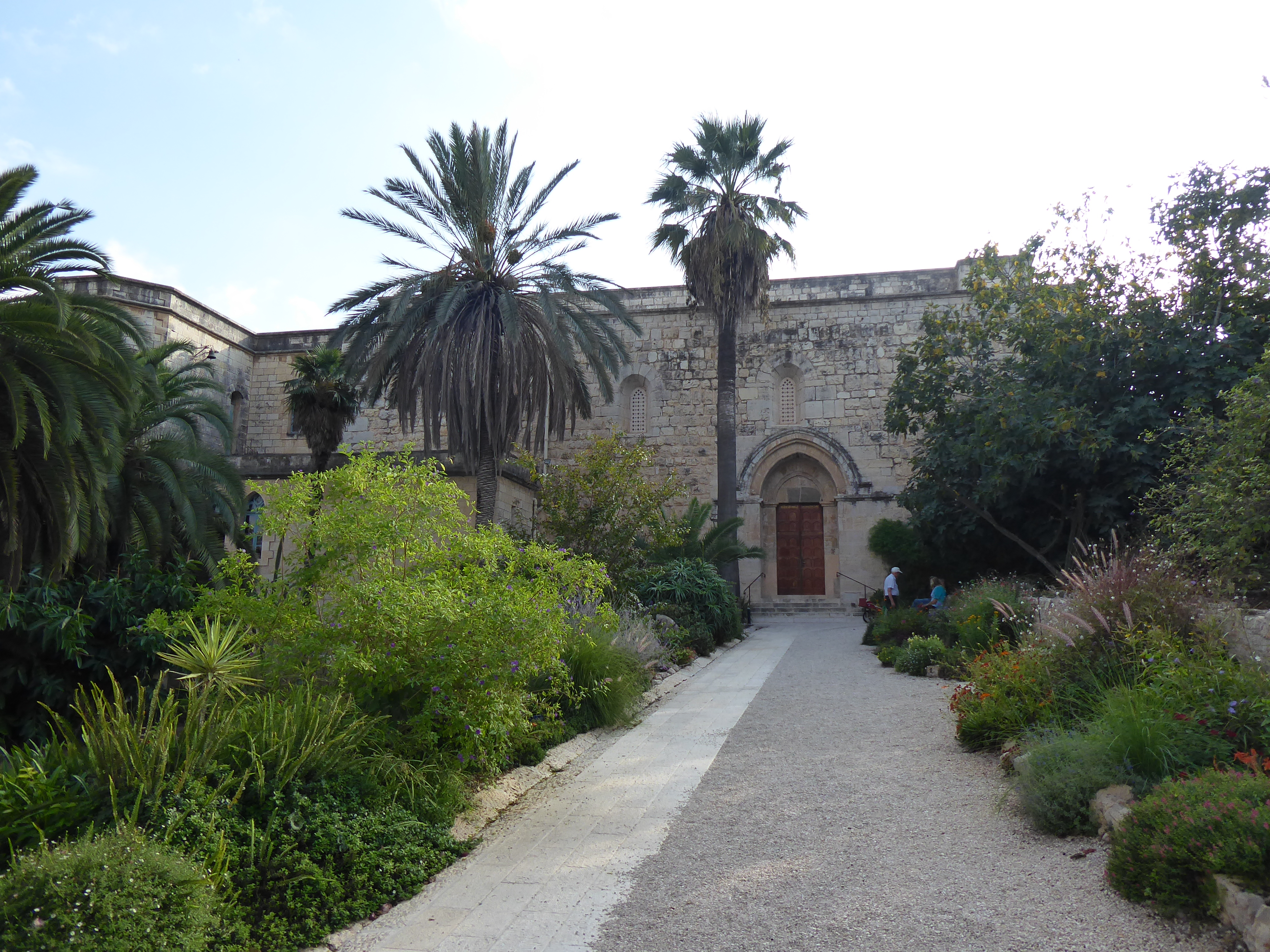
- Resurrection Church
- Location: Abu Ghosh
- Country: Israel
- Denomination: Roman Catholic Church

The Resurrection Church (Hebrew: הכנסייה הצלבנית באבו גוש Latin: Ecclesia Resurrectionis Domini Nostri Iesu), or the Church of the Crusaders in Abu Gosh, is the name given to a Catholic religious building consisting of a structure of the time of the Crusaders who belonged to the Knights Hospitaller, and today is a part of the Benedictine monastery in Abu Ghosh, in central Israel.

The church is located in a place that was interpreted as described in Luke as Emmaus. The Crusader church was probably a Byzantine church, and this in turn was built on a Roman fortress.

== History ==
In 1141 the Crusaders came to Abu Gosh hospital and built the Church of the Resurrection as a fortress. But in 1187, they were driven out of place by Sultan Saladin, although the church, unlike many other Christian churches, was not destroyed or converted into a mosque.

In 1899, the church was bought by the French State from 1901 and used by the Benedictines of France. In 1956, the church was placed under the administration of the Vincentians. Today, it is part of a complex mixed Catholic monastery for both men and women.

== See also ==
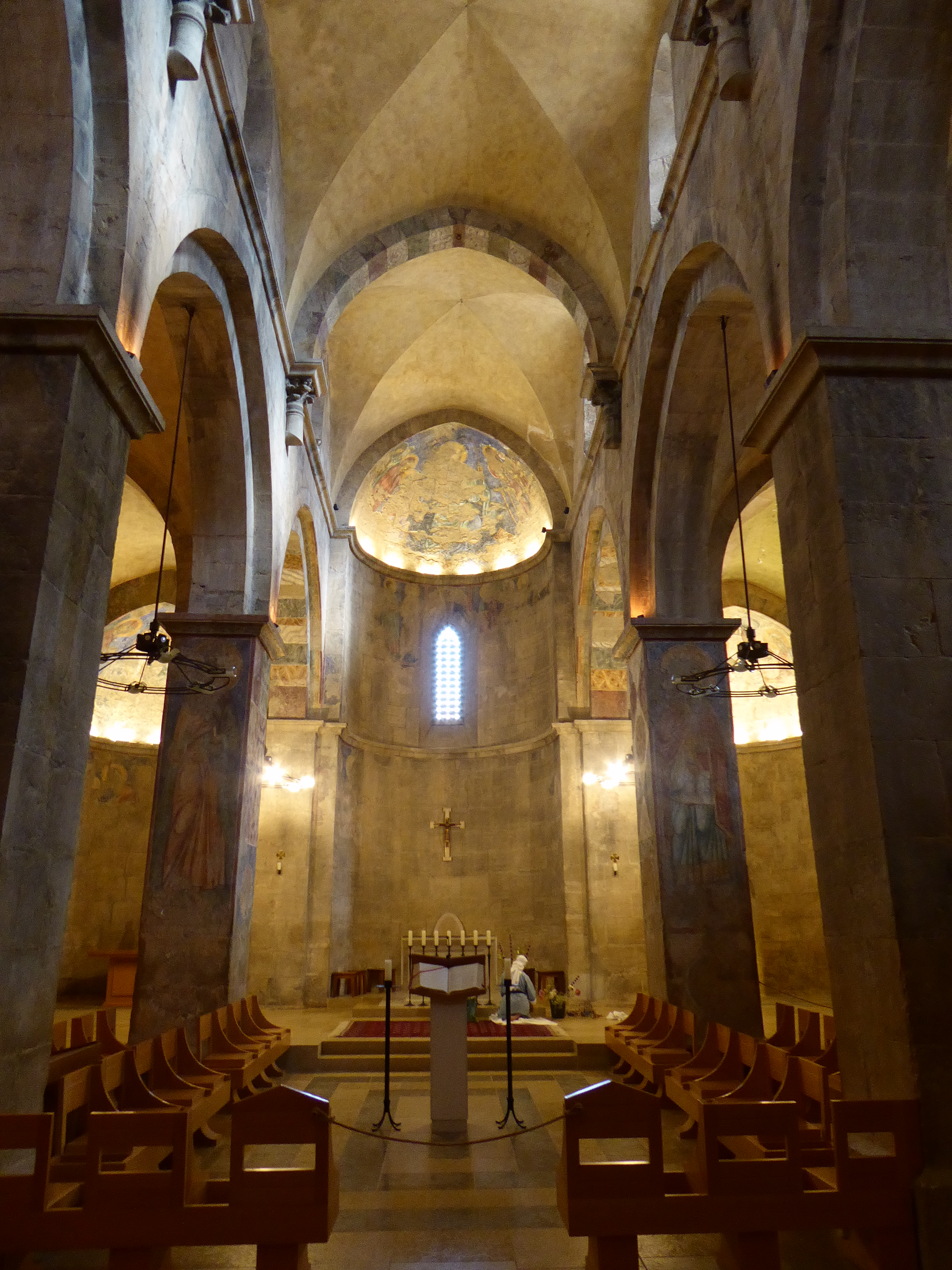
Internal View

- Catholic Church in Israel
- Church of the Resurrection (disambiguation)
