= Abu Ghosh =

Arab village in Israel

Abu Ghosh: אבו גוש • אַבּוּ ע'וֹשׁ; أبو غوش
- Local council
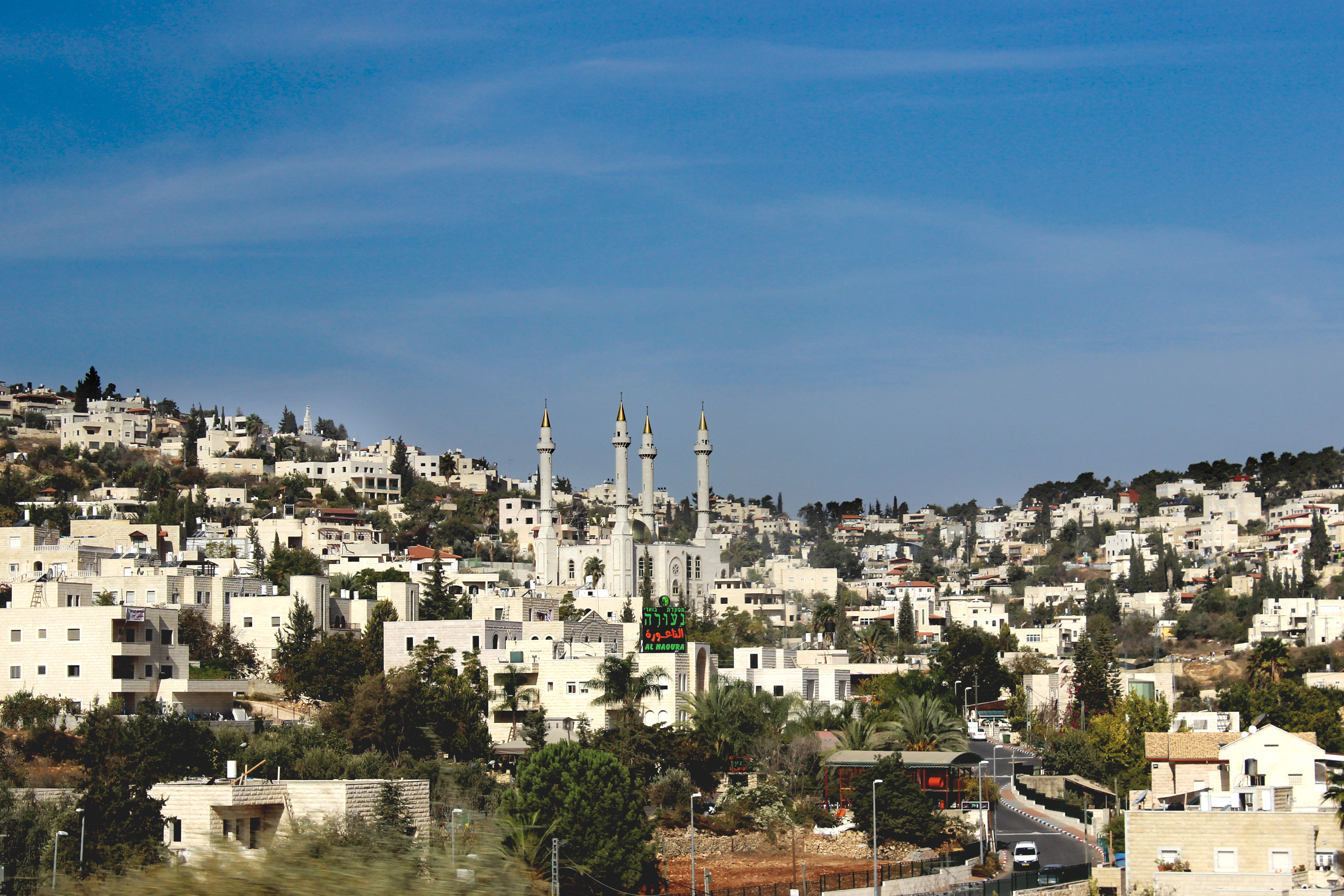

- Flag

- Location within Israel Abu Ghosh (Israel)
- Coordinates: 31°48′17″N 35°6′39″E
- Grid position: 160/134 PAL
- Country: Israel
- District: Jerusalem
- Natural Region: Judean Mountains
- Founded: 7000 BCE (earliest settlement); 16th century (Abu Ghosh clan arrives)

Area
  - Total: 2,500 dunams (2.5 km^{2}; 0.97 sq mi)

Population (2024)
  - Total: 8,848
  - Density: 3,500/km^{2} (9,200/sq mi)

Abu Ghosh (Arabic: أبو غوش; Hebrew: אבו גוש), or in its older formal name Qaryat al-'Anab or Qaryat al-'Inab (Arabic: قرية العنب, lit. 'Grape Village') is an Arab-Israeli local council in Israel, located 10 kilometers (6 mi) west of Jerusalem on the Tel Aviv–Jerusalem highway. It is situated 610 to 720 metres (2,000 to 2,360 ft) above sea level. It takes its current name from the dominant clan inhabiting the town.

== History ==
=== Prehistory ===
Abu Ghosh is located in one of the earliest areas of human habitation in Israel. Archaeological excavations have revealed three Neolithic settlement phases, the middle phase is dated to the 7th millennium BCE.

=== Identification with biblical Kiriath-jearim ===
Qaryat al-'Inab has led to its identification with the biblical site of Kiryat Ye'arim (Hebrew meaning: "Village of Woods"), the town to which the Ark of the Covenant was taken after it had left Beth-shemesh (1 Samuel 6:1–7:2). Edward Robinson was the first modern scholar to suggest that Qaryat al-'Inab was the biblical Kiriath-jearim. The team excavating the hilltop site of Deir al-'Azar, around the Monastery of Our Lady of the Covenant, lists a wide range of arguments in favour of identifying the site with Kiriath-jearim.

In the 19th century, C. R. Conder of the Palestine Exploration Fund (PEF) thought that the old site of Kiriath-jearim should be identified with Kh. 'Erma, a ruin 2.2 miles (3.5 km) south of Kasla, 4 miles (6.4 km) from Beit Shemesh. Elsewhere, Conder and Kitchener, citing a "late tradition," noted that Abu Ghosh was, by some, thought to be Anathoth, the birthplace of the prophet Jeremiah, a tradition which has since been debunked.

=== Roman Empire ===
From the Hellenistic period through the later phases of the First Jewish–Roman War (66–70/73 CE), a Jewish village existed just south of modern-day Abu Ghosh, at the archaeological site of Horbat Mazruq. The area's inhabitants seem to have abandoned their homes due to the advancing Roman forces, who were marching from Emmaus toward Jerusalem during the revolt.

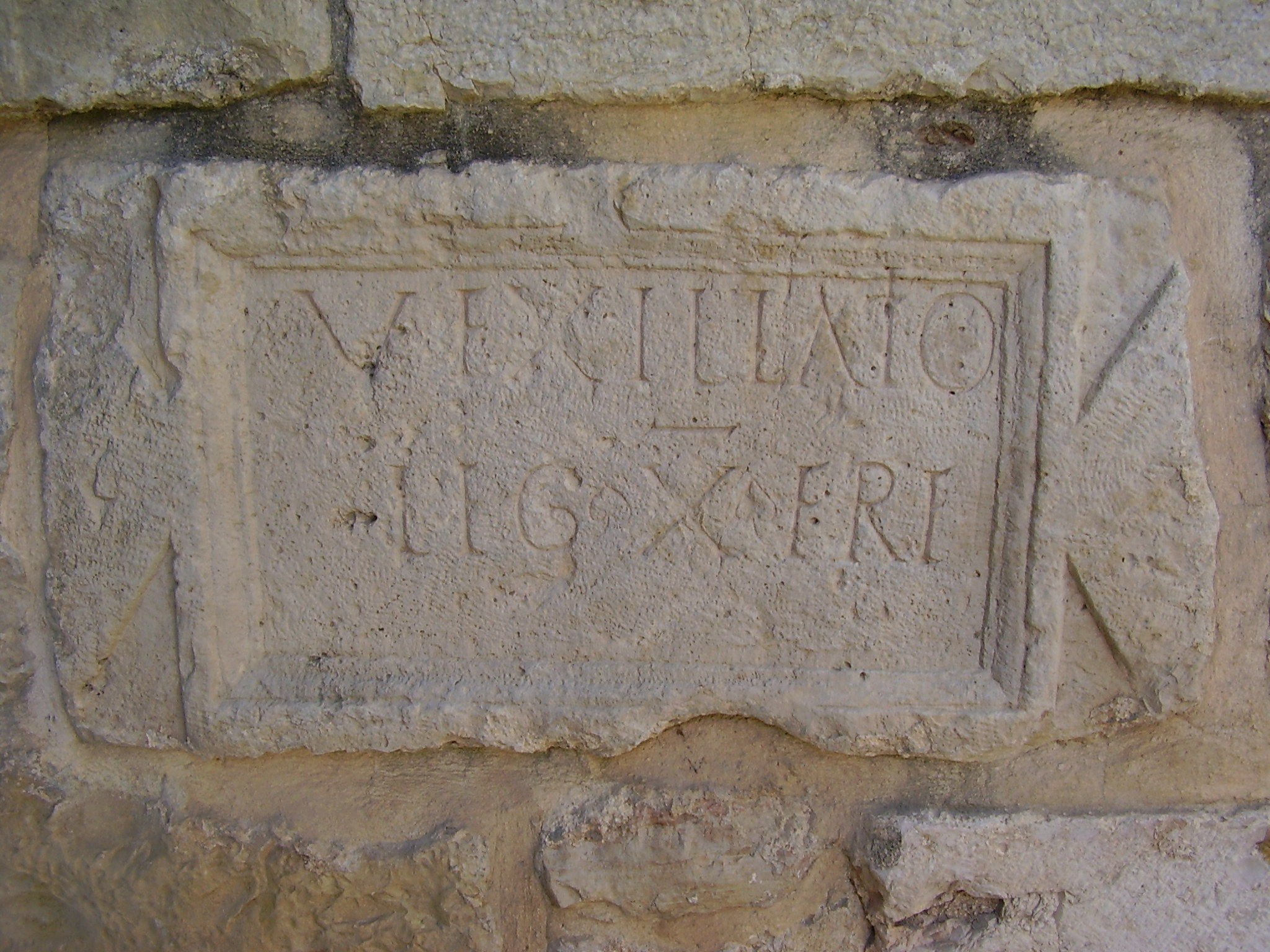
Inscription from Abu Ghosh mentioning a vexillatio of the Xth Roman Legion, Fretensis

By 71/72 CE, the Legio X Fretensis established a station house in Abu Ghosh, where it remained until the end of the 3rd century CE. This legion controlled the Roman road passing through the area.

=== Fatimid Caliphate ===
In 1047, Nasir Khusraw passed through the village while travelling from Ramla to Jerusalem. He noted: "By the wayside I noticed, in quantities, plants of rue (Sadab), which grows here of its own accord on these hills, and in the desert places. In the village of Kariat-al-'Anab there is a fine spring of sweet water gushing out from under a stone, and they have placed all around troughs, with small buildings contiguous (for the shelter of travellers)."

=== Crusaders ===
The Crusaders, who called the village Fontenoid, believed it was the site of Emmaus mentioned in the Gospel of Luke and built a church there. They later abandoned the identification in favour of Emmaus Nicopolis (see Emmaus#Historical identification).

=== Ottoman Empire ===
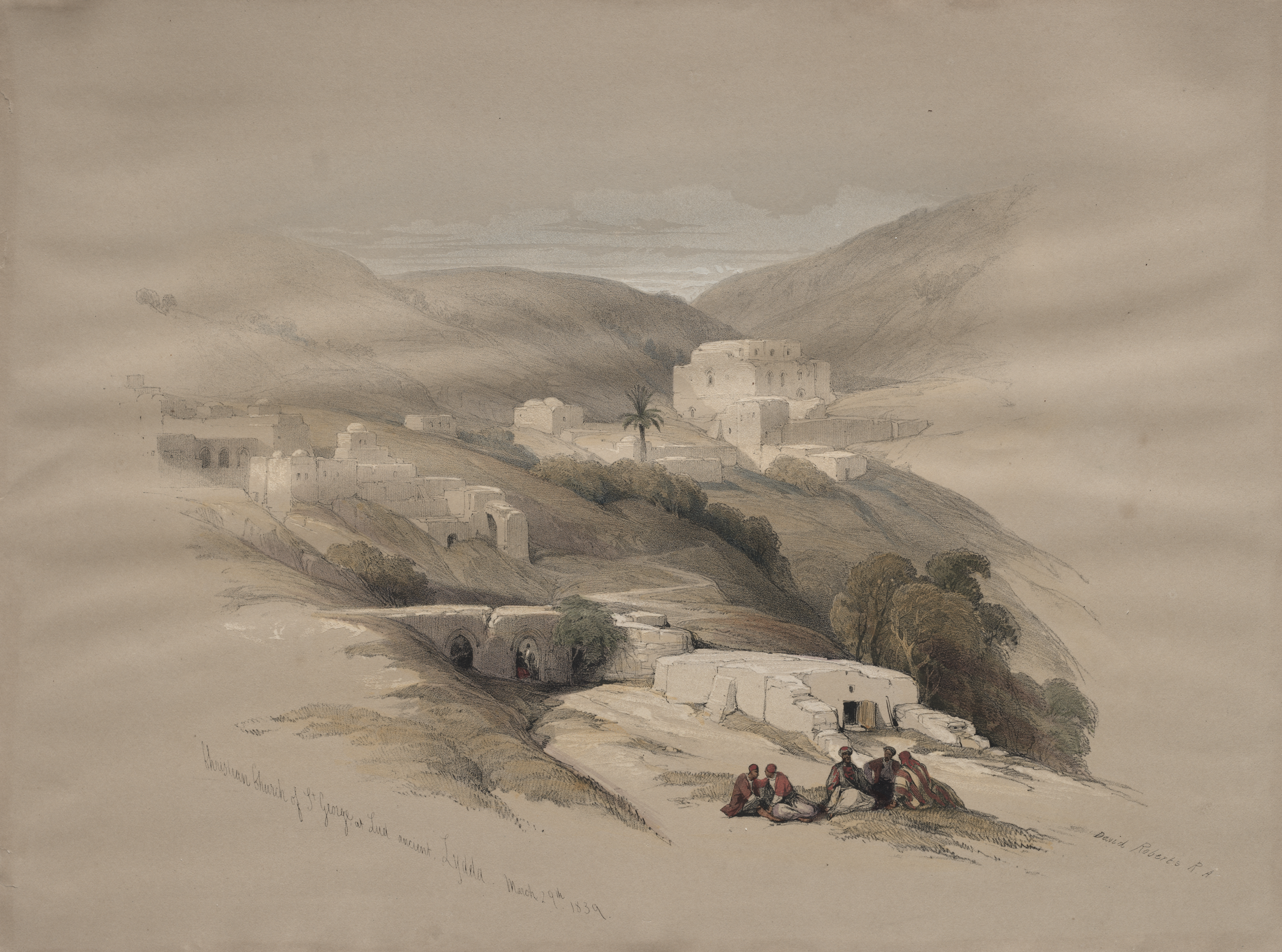
1840s view of Abu Ghosh from The Holy Land, Syria, Idumea, Arabia, Egypt, and Nubia (mistakenly labelled as Lydda)

In the early Ottoman census of 16th century, it was noted as Inab, a village located in the nahiya of Quds.

There are several versions on the origins of the Abu Ghosh clan: According to one version, Abu Ghosh is the name of an Arab family who settled at the location in the early 16th century. According to the Abu Ghosh family tradition, they were of Circassian descent, and their founder fought with Selim I. In the 18th century, they lived in a village near Bayt Nuba, from which they ruled the surrounding region. However, according to the tradition, the Banu 'Amir tribesmen and the villagers of Beit Liqya rose against them and slaughtered the entire Abu Ghosh clan except for one woman and her baby, who continued the Abu Ghosh name. Some, however, assert that the Abu Ghosh are indeed of North Caucasian traditional descent is correct, but the family is of Ingush origin and that "Abu Ghosh" is in fact a corruption of "Abu Ingush".

The Abu Ghosh family controlled the pilgrimage route from Jaffa to Jerusalem, and imposed tolls on all pilgrims passing through. They were given this privilege during the sultanate of Suleiman the Magnificent (1494–1566), after the area was conquered in the Ottoman–Mamluk War. The churches in Jerusalem also paid a tax to the Abu Ghosh clan. In 1834, during Egyptian rule in Palestine, the Egyptian governor Ibrahim Pasha abolished the Abu Ghosh's right to exact tolls from the pilgrimage route and imprisoned the clan's chief, Ibrahim Abu Ghosh, leading to the clan's temporary participation in the countrywide Peasants' Revolt. As a result, their village was attacked by Egyptian military forces.

In 1838, it was noted as a Muslim village, named Kuryet el'-Enab, located in the Beni Malik district.

It was attacked again in 1853 during a civil war between feudal families under Ahmad Abu Ghosh who ordered his nephew Mustafa to go to battle. A third attack on Abu Ghosh, carried out by the Ottoman military forces, helped and executed by British forces, took place during the military expedition against the feudal families in the 1860s. The Abu Ghoshes were among the well-known feudal families in Palestine. They governed 22 villages. The sheikh of Abu Ghosh lived in an impressive house described by pilgrims and tourists as a "true palace ... a castle ... a protective fortress ..."

An Ottoman village list of about 1870 showed that Abu Ghosh had 148 houses and a population of 579, though the population count included men only.

In the 19th century, the village was also referred to as Kuryet el' Enab.

In 1896 the population of Abu Ghosh was estimated to be about 1,200 persons.

At the beginning of the 20th century Qariat el-'Inab functioned as a 'throne village', or local seat of power.

Kiryat Anavim, the first kibbutz in the Judean Hills, was founded near Abu Ghosh in 1914, on land purchased from the Abu Ghosh family.

=== British Mandate ===
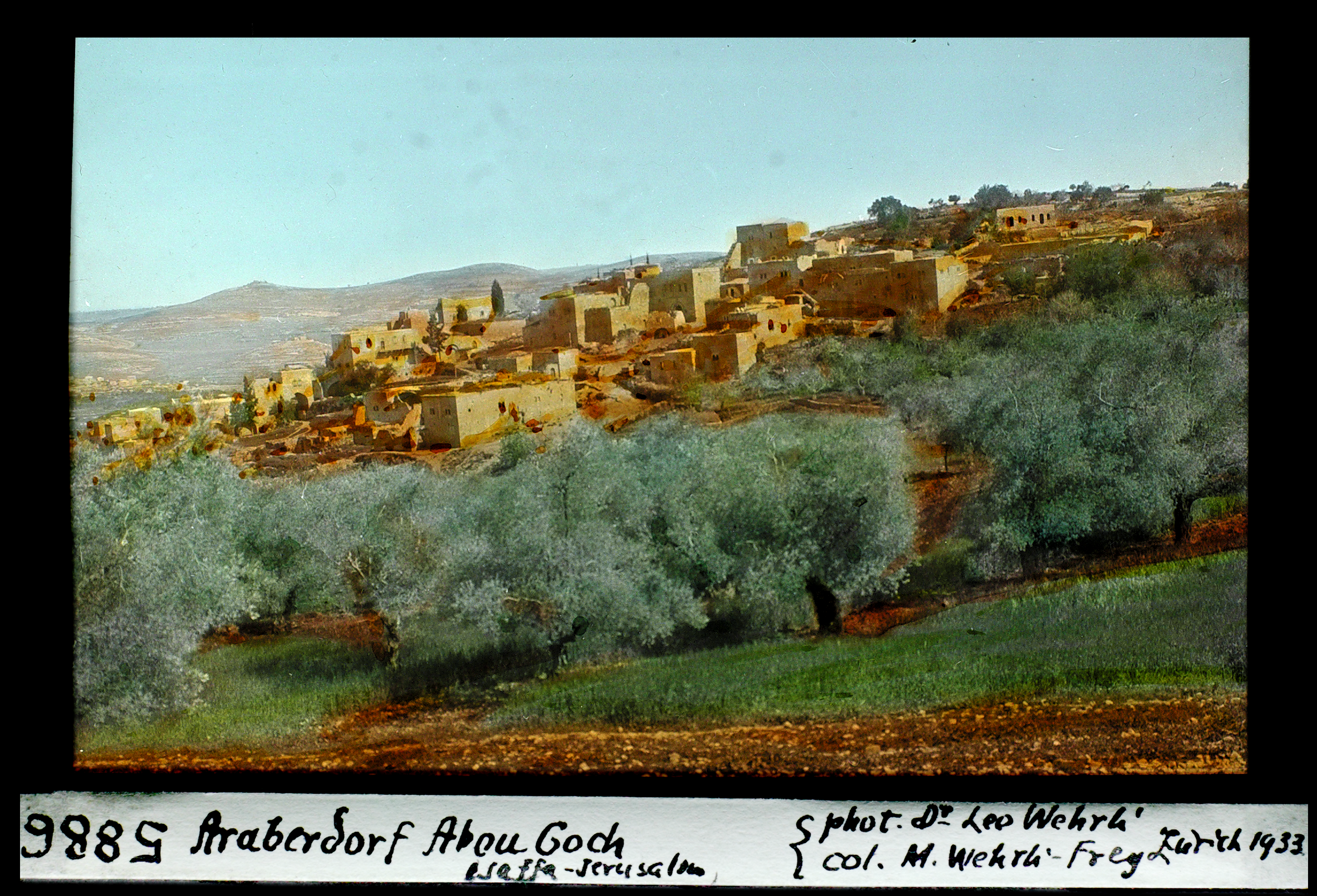
Abu Ghosh in 1933

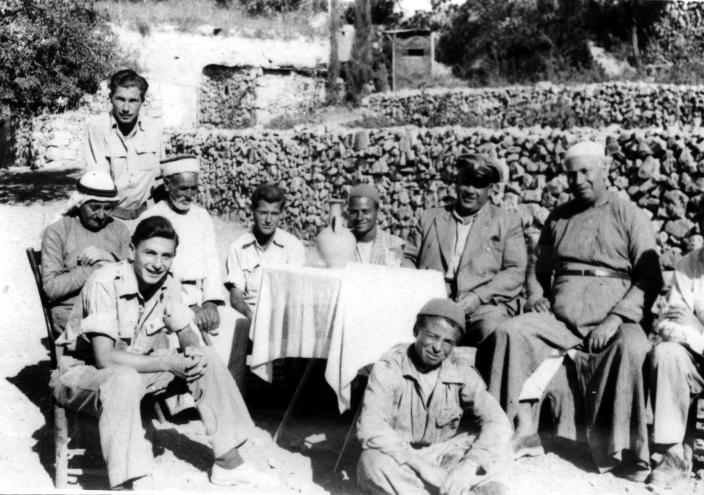
Photograph from Palmach Archive. Caption: "Abu Ghosh – a Jewish-Arab friendship" 1948

In the 1922 census of Palestine conducted by the British Mandate authorities, Enab had a population 475, including 450 Muslims and 25 Christians, increasing in the 1931 census to 601; 576 Muslims and 25 Christians, in 138 houses.

When Chaim Weizmann, later the first president of the State of Israel, visited Palestine in the spring of 1920, he was hosted by the residents of Abu Ghosh. From the early 20th century, the leaders of Abu Ghosh worked together and were on friendly terms with the Zionist leaders, and local Jews.

In the 1945 Village Statistics the population of Qaryat el 'Inab (Abu Ghosh) was 860; 820 Muslims and 40 Christians, with a total of 7,590 dunams of land according to an official land and population survey. Of this, a total of 1,517 dunams were plantations and irrigable land, 3,274 for cereals, while 21 dunams were built-up (urban) land.

During the 1947–48 Civil War in Mandatory Palestine and into the 1948 Arab-Israeli War, the road to Jerusalem was blocked for Jews, as passage through the hills surrounding Jerusalem was crucial for getting supplies to the Jewish parts of the besieged city. Of the 36 Arab Muslim villages in these hills, Abu Ghosh was the only one that remained neutral, and in many cases helped to keep the road open for Jewish convoys. "From here it is possible to open and close the gates to Jerusalem," said former President Yitzhak Navon. Many in Abu Ghosh helped Israel with supplies.

During Operation Nachshon the Haganah reconsidered an attack on Abu Ghosh due to opposition of the Lehi, whose local commanders were on good terms with the mukhtar (village chief).

=== Israel ===
==== 20th century ====
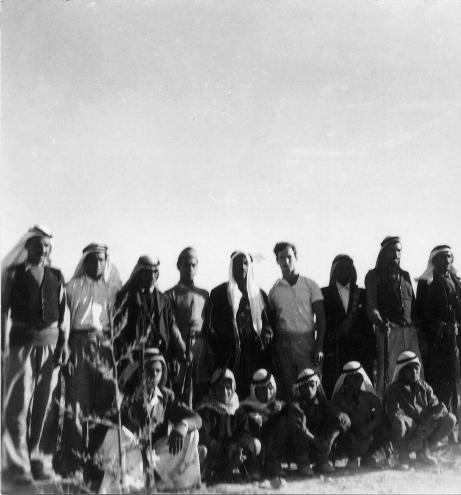
Harel Brigade training with Arabs of Abu Ghosh. 1948

During the 1948 Arab–Israeli War, the Har'el Brigade headquarters were located in Abu-Ghosh. Many of the villagers left Abu Ghosh during the heavy fighting in 1948, but most returned home in the following months.

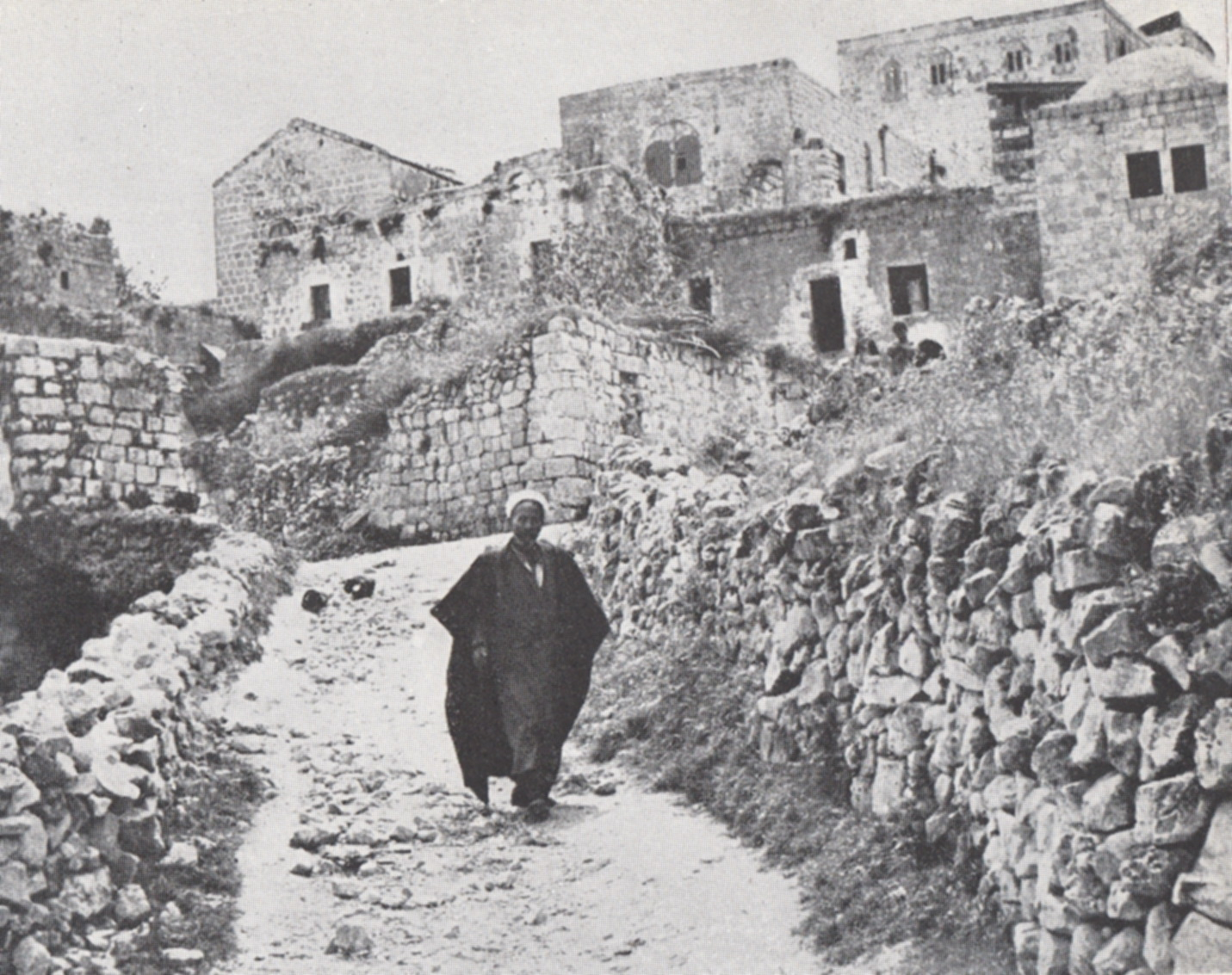
Abu Ghosh village in 1948-1951

During the early years of the State of Israel the village was subjected to repeated searches by the army and anyone who had not registered as resident in November 1948 could be expelled. One case attracted a lot of public criticism. In June 1950, the IDF and police deported 105 men and women believed to be "infiltrators" to Jordan. In an open letter to the Knesset, the inhabitants of Abu Ghosh claimed that the army had "surrounded our village, and taken our women, children and old folk, and thrown them over the border and into the Negev Desert, and many of them died in consequence, when they were shot [trying to make their way back across] the borders." The letter further stated that they woke up to "shouts blaring over the loudspeaker announcing that the village was surrounded and anyone trying to get out would be shot. ... The police and military forces then began to enter the houses and conduct meticulous searches, but no contraband was found. In the end, using force and blows, they gathered up our women, and old folk and children, the sick and the blind and pregnant women. These shouted for help but there was no saviour. And we looked on and were powerless to do anything save beg for mercy. Alas, our pleas were of no avail... They then took the prisoners, who were weeping and screaming, to an unknown place, and we still do not know what befell them."

Knesset member Moshe Erem accused the army of excessive force, a charge that Prime Minister Ben-Gurion denied. He also defended the policy of expulsions. Foreign Minister Moshe Sharett, concerned about international reaction, argued that there should be more searches with fewer people being deported at one time and then only adult males. One of the issues causing concern in this case was that some of those expelled had been resident in Abu Ghosh for over a year. In the wake of public pressure, the vast majority of villagers were allowed to return. In July 1952, MK Beba Idelson objected to the deportation of an Abu Ghosh woman, who was said to have cancer, and her four children. The police minister Bechor-Shalom Sheetrit rejected the claim that the woman had cancer. The village remained under martial law until 1966.

The Israeli government, subsequently on peaceful terms with the village, invested in improving the infrastructure of the village.

==== 21st century ====
Abu Ghosh mayor Salim Jaber attributed in 2007 the good relations with Israel to the great importance attached to being hospitable: "We welcome anybody, regardless of religion or race." According to a village elder interviewed by The Globe and Mail: "Perhaps because of the history of feuding with the Arabs around us we allied ourselves with the Jews ... against the British. We did not join the Arabs from the other villages bombarding Jewish vehicles in 1947. The Palmach fought many villages around us. But there was an order to leave us alone. The other Arabs never thought there would be a Jewish government here. ... During the first truce of the War of Independence, I was on my way to Ramallah to see my father and uncles, and I was captured by Jordanian soldiers. They accused me of being a traitor and tortured me for six days."

In 2017, Abu Ghosh was described as a "model of coexistence."

== Archaeology ==
In 2017 an archaeological dig began at Deir el-'Azar, the site of the convent, led by Israel Finkelstein of Tel Aviv University and Christophe Nicolle and Thomas Römer of the College de France. The first season brought to light a huge stone platform or podium measuring 110 by 150 metres (360 by 490 ft) at the top of the hill, with retaining walls 3 metres (9.8 ft), 6 to 7 metres (20 to 23 ft) high and perfectly aligned north–south and east–west, which were dated to the first half of the eighth century BCE during the Iron IIB period (900–700 BCE). Finkelstein attributed the ancient structure to King Jeroboam II of the northern Kingdom of Israel, seeing in it a sign of its dominance over the southern Kingdom of Judah and its capital, Jerusalem. He speculated that the platform might have housed an administration compound that included a temple of the Ark, with the aim of enforcing the domination of Israel over Judah.

The hilltop shows signs of intensive settlement activity during the Iron IIC period (700–586 BCE), when the rectangular podium at the summit was reconstructed. Renewed reconstruction of the podium took place in the late Hellenistic period, possibly as part of the fortification works undertaken by the Seleucid general Bacchides. In the first century CE it seems that the flat hilltop was used as a Roman camp by the Xth Roman legion, Fretensis, for which reason the Romans extended the platform to create a perfectly square 150-by-150-metre (490 by 490 ft) base for their fortified camp. From the Byzantine period remains of a basilica were discovered, possibly dating to the 5th century. The Arabic name Deir el-ʿAzar, lit. "Monastery of el-ʿAzar" may be a corruption of Eleazar, leading to the theory that it was named after the high priest who was charge of the Ark while it was at Kiriath-jearim (1 Sam 7:1). This monastery seems to have functioned to the end of the Byzantine and maybe into the beginning of the Early Islamic period, since very few pottery sherds were found from a later period.

== Local government ==
Abu Ghosh is governed by a local council, and is part of the Jerusalem District. The current mayor of Abu Ghosh is Kazem Ibrahim. According to the Israel Central Bureau of Statistics (CBS), Abu Ghosh had a population of 8,848 in 2024.

== Religious sites ==
=== Benedictine St Mary of the Resurrection Abbey ===
The Crusader church at the historical entrance to the village, now at the centre of the Benedictine Monastery, is one of the best preserved Crusader remains in the country. The Hospitallers had built this late Romanesque/early Gothic church in 1140 and it was partially destroyed in 1187. It was acquired by the French government in 1899 and placed under guardianship of the French Benedictine Fathers. Since 1956, it has been run by the Lazarist Fathers. Today a double community of nuns and brothers continue the worship in the church and offer hospitality, reflecting the ancient story of the couple on the Jerusalem–Emmaus road. Edward Robinson (1838) described it as "obviously from the time of the crusades, and [...] more perfectly preserved than any other ancient church in Palestine." Excavations carried out in 1944 confirm that the Crusaders identified the site as the biblical Emmaus. The church is now known as both Church of the Resurrection and Emmaus of the Crusaders.

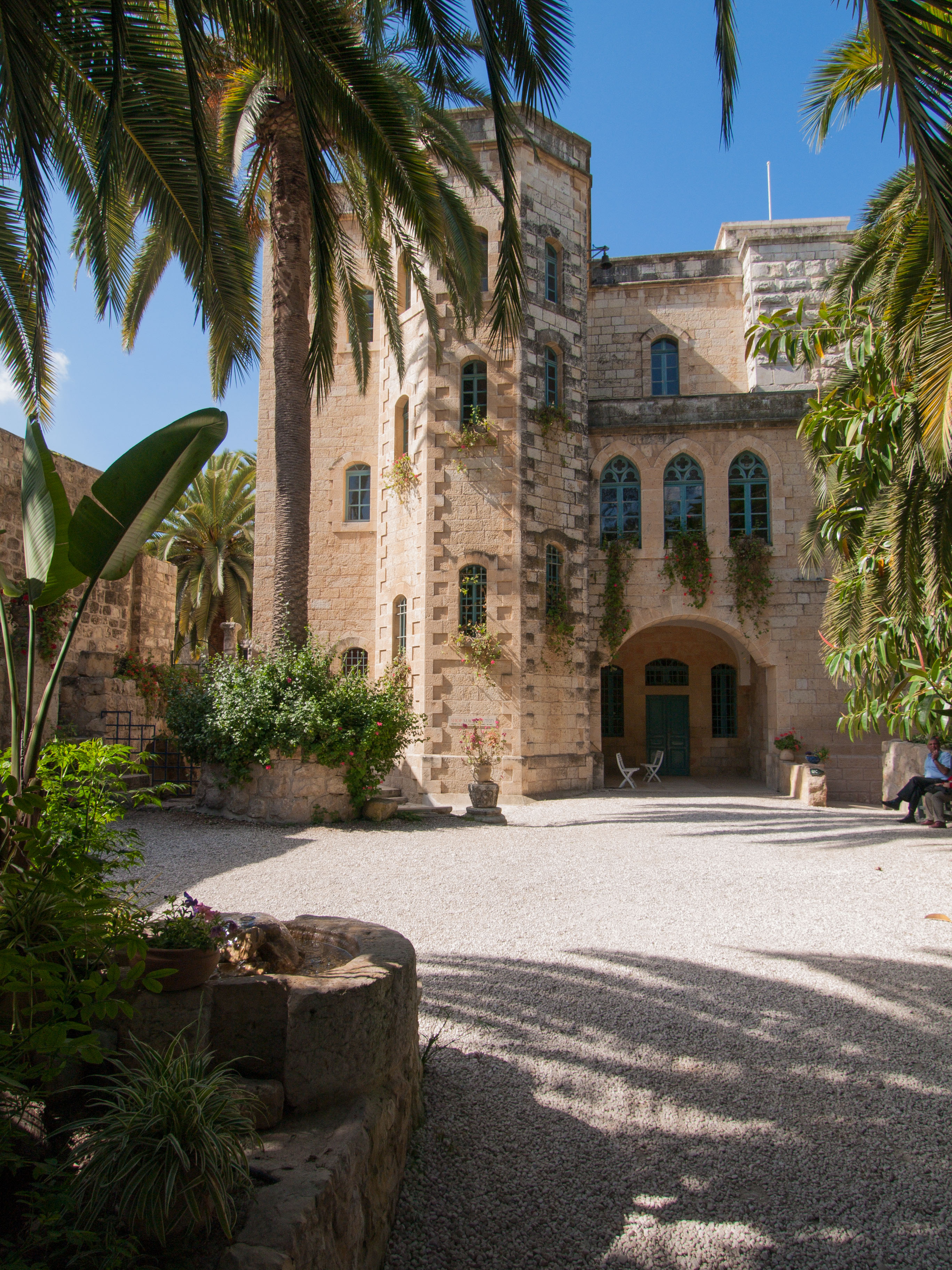
Abu Ghosh, the Benedictine monastery

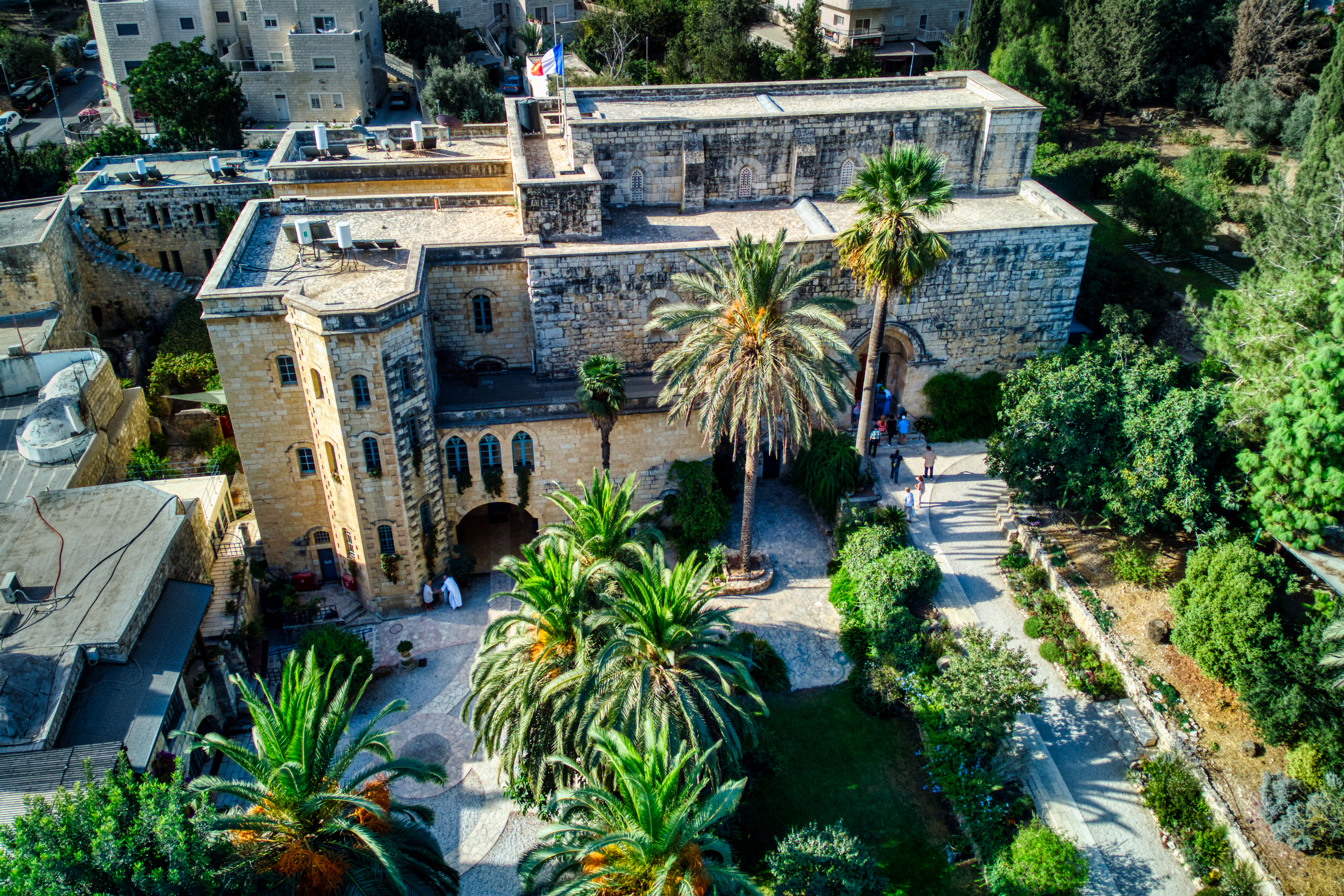
the Benedictine monastery and its surroundings

=== Church of Notre Dame ===
The Church of Notre Dame de l'Arche d'Alliance (Our Lady of the Ark of the Covenant Church), built in 1924, is said to occupy the site of the house of Abinadab, where the Ark of the Covenant rested for twenty years until King David took it to Jerusalem. It is built on the site of a fifth-century Byzantine church, from which a 5th-century mosaic floor was preserved. The church is recognizable by the roof-top statue of Mary carrying the infant Jesus in her arms.

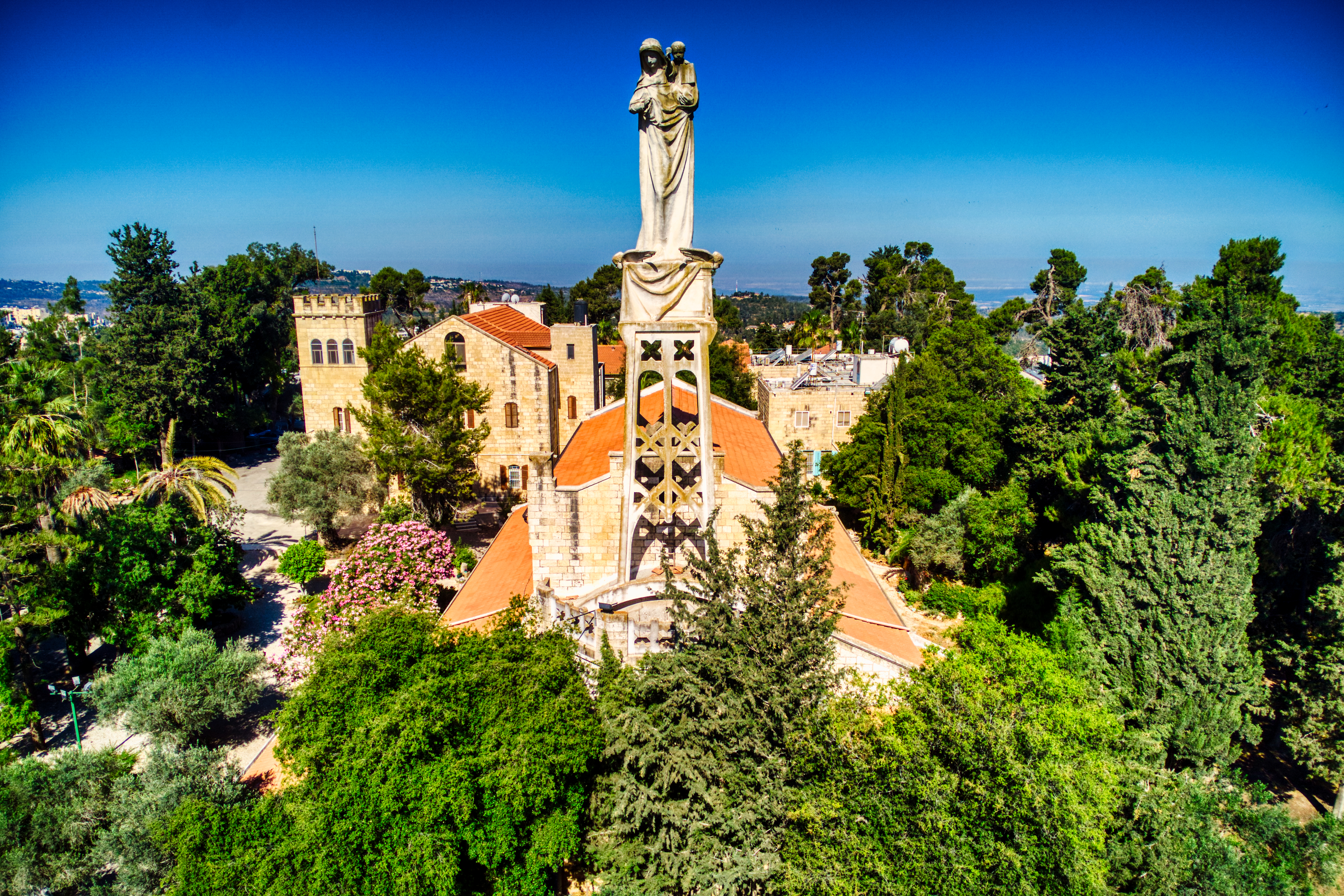
The statue of Madonna and Child above the Church of Notre Dame

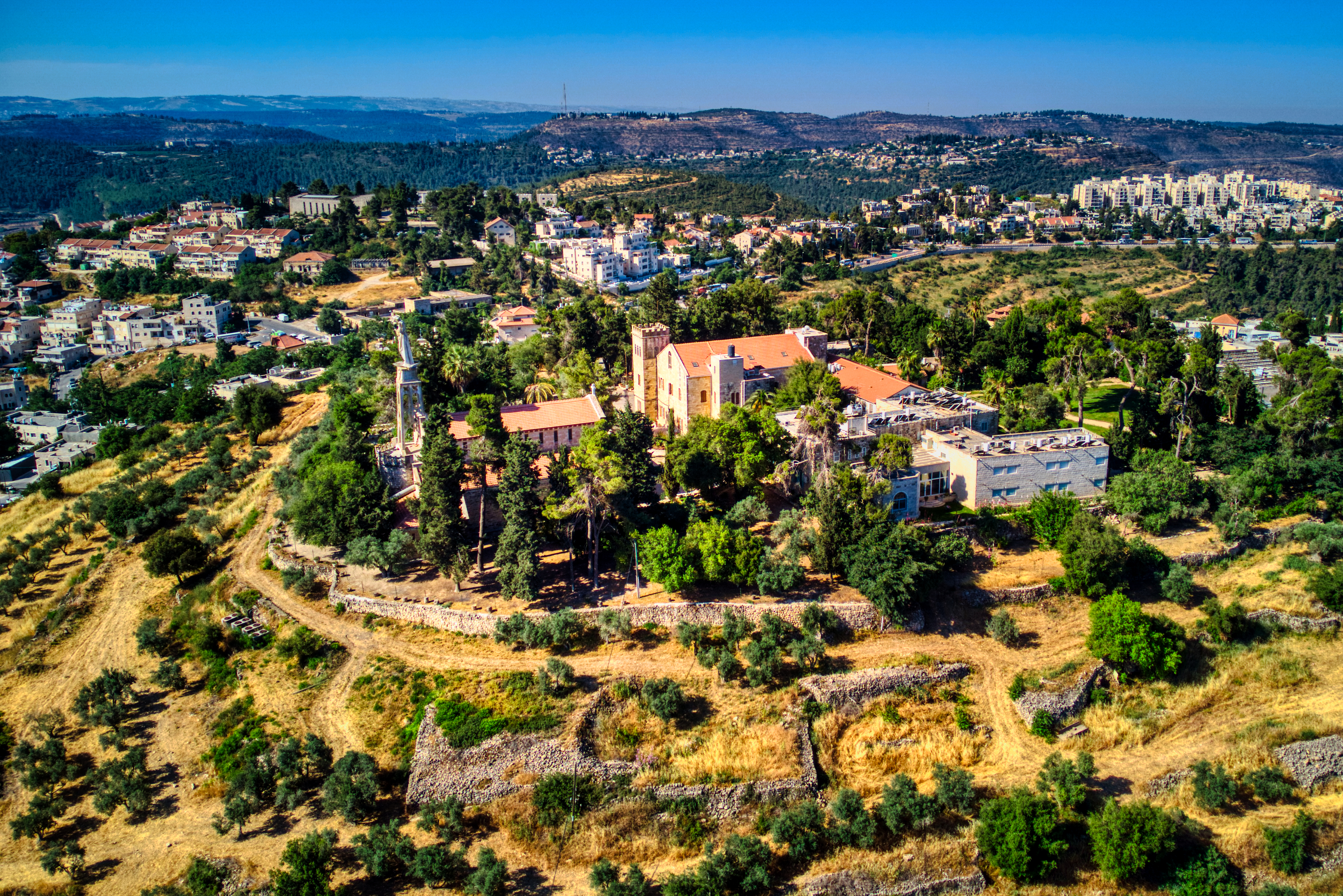
Church of Notre Dame and its surroundings

=== Abu Ghosh mosques ===
Abu Ghosh's historic mosque is in the town center, near the Crusader church, and is dedicated to Uzair-biblical Ezra (Quran 9:30). The new Akhmad Kadyrov Mosque, completed in 2014, is the largest mosque in Israel and was built with money donated by the Chechen government.

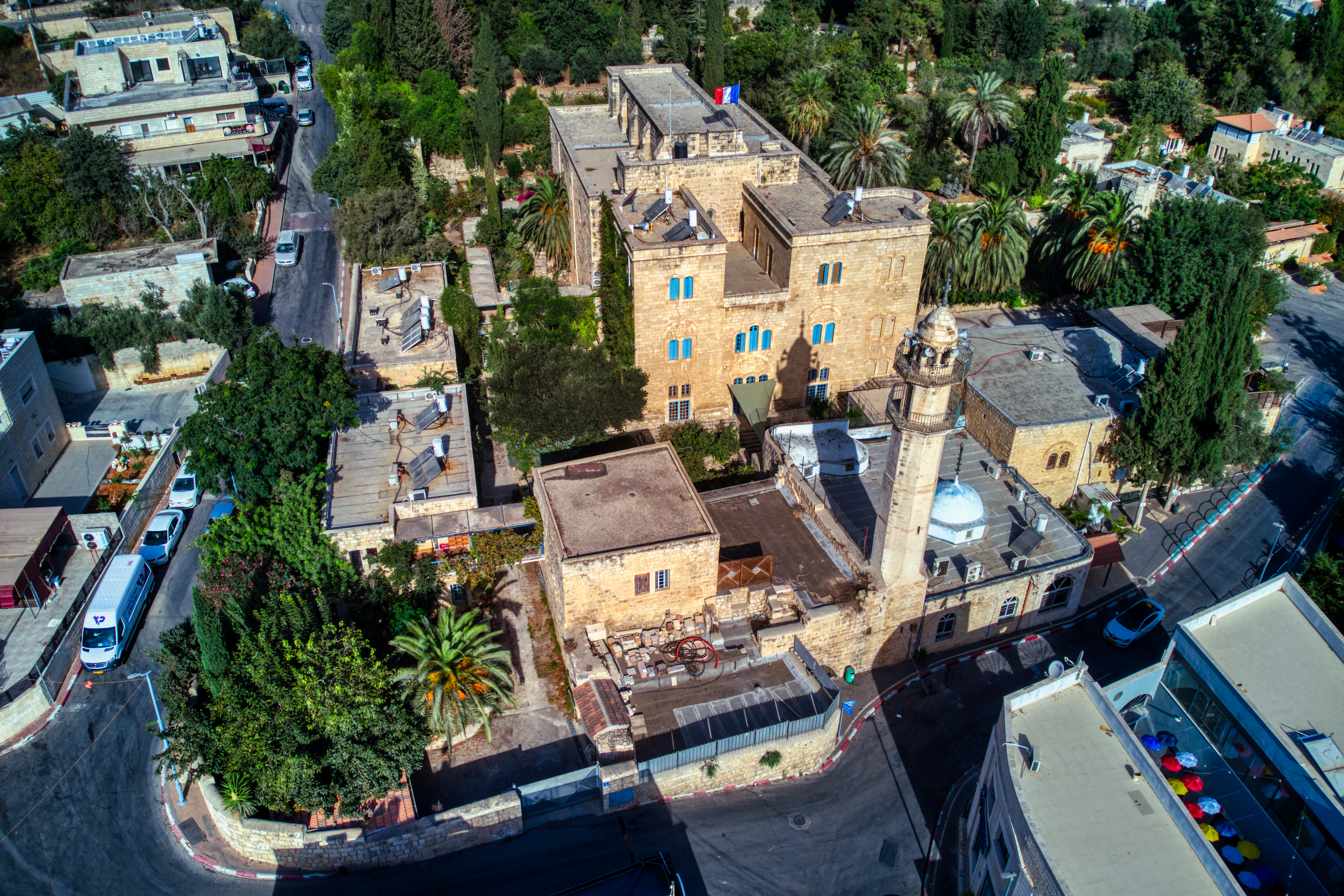
The historical mosque of Abu Ghosh

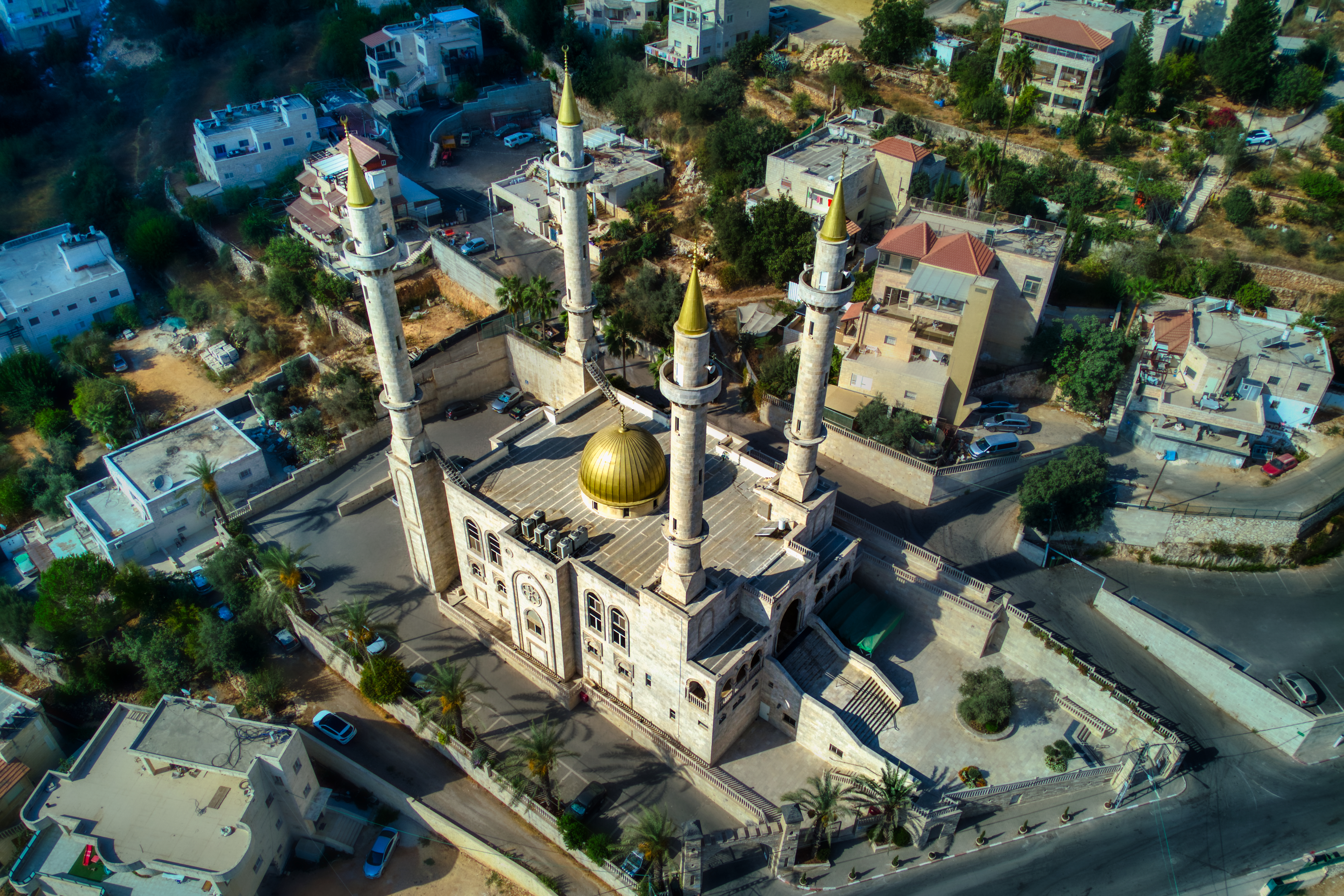
The new Akhmad Kadyrov Mosque

== Music and culture ==
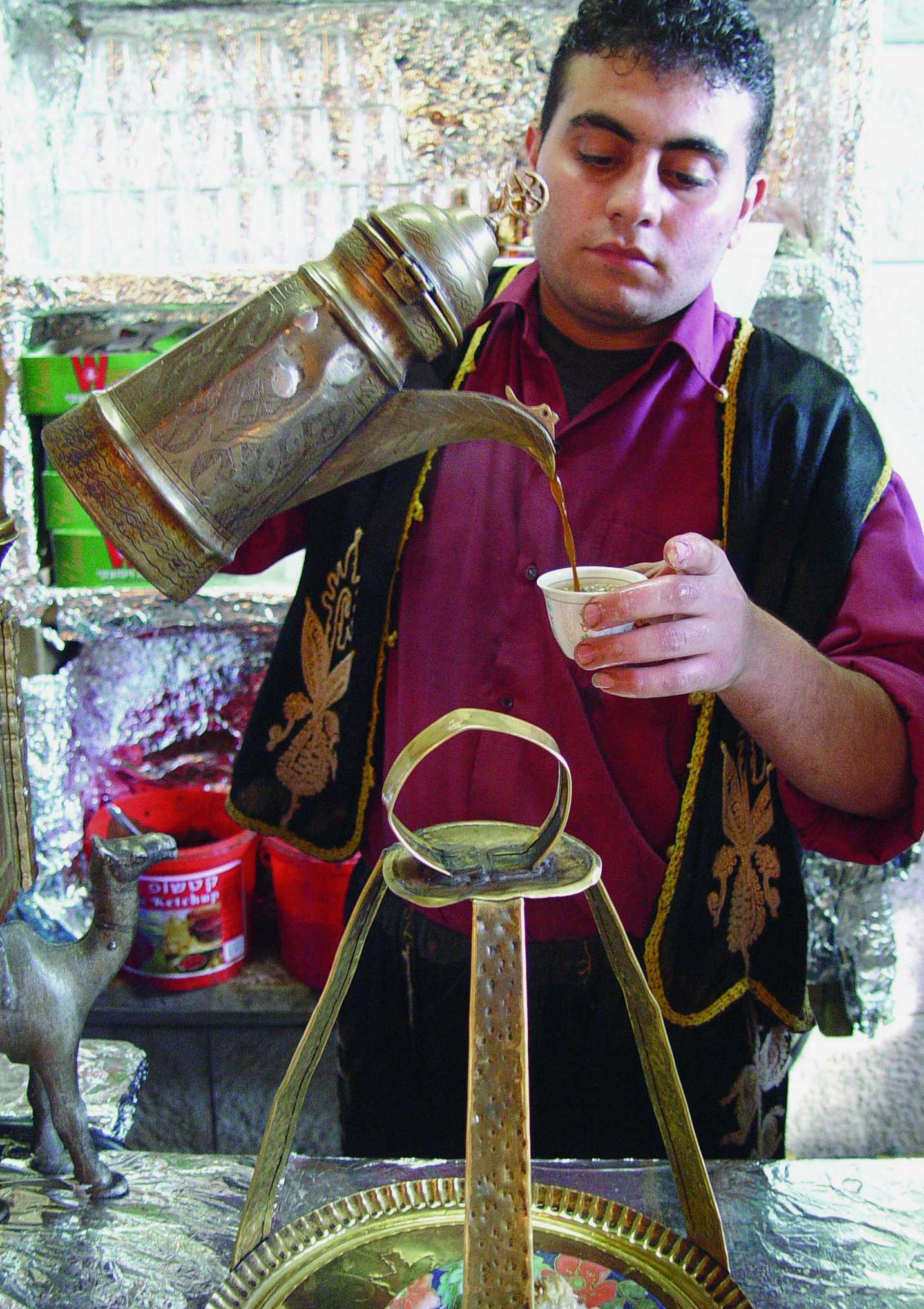
Pouring "Turkish" coffee in Abu Ghosh

The Abu Gosh Music Festival is held twice a year, in the fall and late spring, with musical ensembles and choirs from Israel and abroad performing in and around the churches in Abu Ghosh. The monks believe that holding concerts on the grounds of their churches is a "fine symbol of friendship and welcome. Jews coming to a Muslim community to hear music in a Christian church...is a small, white pebble in the path that we want."

== Local cuisine ==
Abu Ghosh is popular among Palestinians and Israelis for its Middle Eastern restaurants and hummus.

In 2007, Abu Ghosh was described as the "hummus capital of Israel." In January 2010, Abu Ghosh secured the Guinness World Record for preparing the largest dish of hummus in the world. Jawdat Ibrahim, owner of Abu Ghosh hummus restaurant, organized the event, which brought together 50 Jewish and Israeli-Arab chefs. The winning 20-foot (6.1 m) dish weighed 4,087.5 kilograms (8992.5 pounds), about twice as much as the previous record set by Lebanon in October 2009. In May 2010, Lebanon regained the Guinness World Record, more than doubling Abu Ghosh's January 2010 total.

== Chametz ceremony ==
Since 1997, Jaaber Hussein, a Muslim Arab-Israeli hotel food manager from Abu Ghosh, has signed an agreement with Israel's Chief Rabbis to purchase all of the state's chametz, the leavened products not kosher for the Jewish holiday of Passover. This contractually binding deal allows the state to respect religious edicts without wastefully destroying massive quantities of food. In 2009, Hussein put down a cash deposit of $4,800 (about 20,000 shekels) for $150 million worth of chametz, acquired from state companies, the prison service and the national stock of emergency supplies. At the end of Passover each year, the deposit is returned to Hussein and the State of Israel buys back all the food products.

== Voting Patterns ==
In the 2022 election, 87 percent of voters in Abu Ghosh voted for the Arab parties, while 8 percent voted for the parties of the right-wing coalition led by Benjamin Netanyahu and 4 percent voted for the parties of the center-left coalition led by Yair Lapid. Among the voters for the Arab parties, 52 percent voted for Balad, while 35 percent voted for Ra'am and 13 percent voted for the Hadash–Ta'al list.

In the 2026 election, 91 percent of voters in Abu Ghosh voted for the Arab parties, while 6 percent voted for the parties of the center-left coalition led by Gadi Eisenkot and 1 percent voted for the parties of the right-wing coalition led by Benjamin Netanyahu. Among the voters for the Arab parties, 61 percent voted for the Joint List, while 39 percent voted for Ra'am. Voter turnout increased 55 percent from the 2022 election.

== Gallery ==
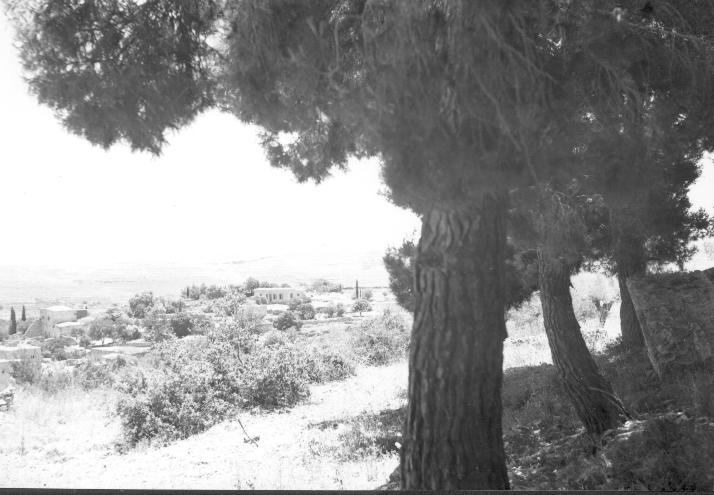
Abu Ghosh 1948

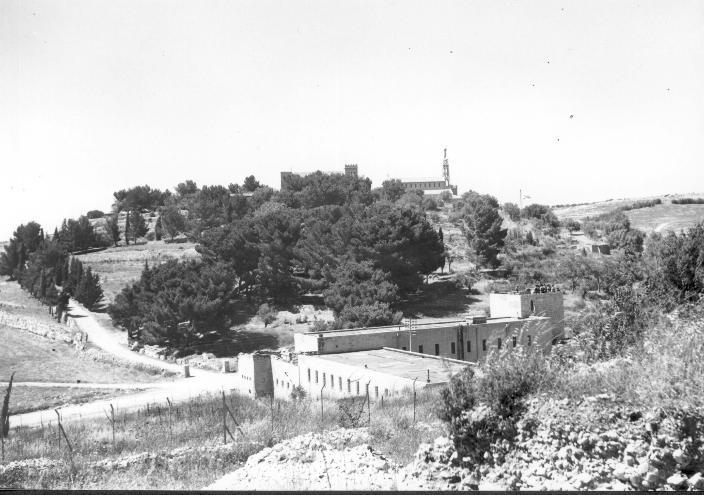
Abu Ghosh 1948. Police station in foreground.

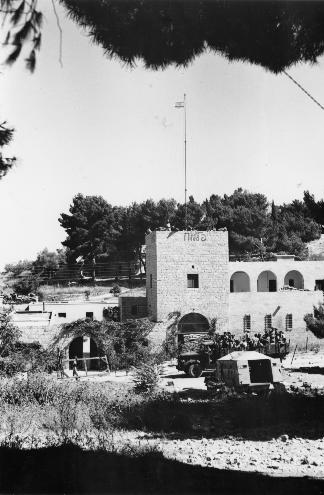
Abu Ghosh Police Station used as headquarters by Harel Brigade, 1948

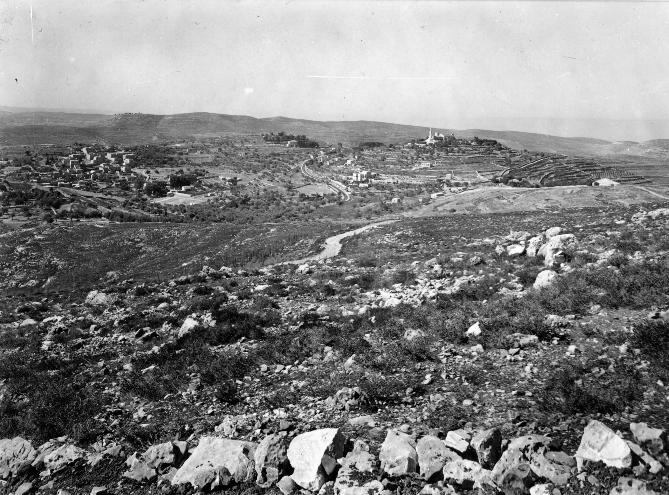
View of Abu Ghosh 1948

== See also ==
- Arab localities in Israel
- List of modern names for biblical place names

== Bibliography ==
- Barron, J. B., ed. (1923). Palestine: Report and General Abstracts of the Census of 1922. Government of Palestine.
- Conder, C.R.; Kitchener, H. H. (1883). The Survey of Western Palestine: Memoirs of the Topography, Orography, Hydrography, and Archaeology. Vol. 3. London: Committee of the Palestine Exploration Fund. (pp. 18, 43, 132–133)
- Department of Statistics (1945). Village Statistics, April, 1945. Government of Palestine.
- Finn, J. (1878). E. A. Finn (ed.). Stirring Times, or, Records from Jerusalem Consular Chronicles of 1853 to 1856. Edited and Compiled by His Widow E. A. Finn. With a Preface by the Viscountess Strangford. Vol. 1. London: C.K. Paul & co.
- Hadawi, S. (1970). Village Statistics of 1945: A Classification of Land and Area ownership in Palestine. Palestine Liberation Organization Research Centre. Archived from the original on 8 December 2018.
- Hartmann, M. (1883). "Die Ortschaftenliste des Liwa Jerusalem in dem türkischen Staatskalender für Syrien auf das Jahr 1288 der Flucht (1871)". Zeitschrift des Deutschen Palästina-Vereins. 6: 102–149.
- Mills, E., ed. (1932). Census of Palestine 1931. Population of Villages, Towns and Administrative Areas. Jerusalem: Government of Palestine.
- Morris, B. (1994). "The Case of Abu Ghosh and Beit Naqquba, Al Fureidis and Jisr Zarka in 1948 -or Why Four Villages Remained". 1948 and after; Israel and the Palestinians. Oxford University Press. pp. 257–289. ISBN 0-19-827929-9.
- Mukaddasi (1886). Description of Syria, including Palestine. London: Palestine Pilgrims' Text Society.
- Nasir-I-Khusrau; et al. (1897). Vol IV. A journey through Syria and Palestine (1047 CE.). The pilgrimage of Saewolf to Jerusalem. The pilgrimage of the Russian abbot Daniel. London: Palestine Pilgrims' Text Society.
- Palmer, E. H. (1881). The Survey of Western Palestine: Arabic and English Name Lists Collected During the Survey by Lieutenants Conder and Kitchener, R. E. Transliterated and Explained by E.H. Palmer. Committee of the Palestine Exploration Fund. (p. 321)
- Robinson, E.; Smith, E. (1841). Biblical Researches in Palestine, Mount Sinai and Arabia Petraea: A Journal of Travels in the year 1838. Vol. 2. Boston: Crocker & Brewster. p. 335
- Robinson, E.; Smith, E. (1841). Biblical Researches in Palestine, Mount Sinai and Arabia Petraea: A Journal of Travels in the year 1838. Vol. 3. Boston: Crocker & Brewster.
- Rood, Judith Mendelsohn (2004). Sacred Law In The Holy City: The Khedival Challenge To The Ottomans As Seen From Jerusalem, 1829–1841. BRILL. ISBN 9789004138100.
- Schick, C. (1896). "Zur Einwohnerzahl des Bezirks Jerusalem". Zeitschrift des Deutschen Palästina-Vereins. 19: 120–127.
- Sharon, M. (1997). Corpus Inscriptionum Arabicarum Palaestinae, A. Vol. 1. BRILL. ISBN 90-04-10833-5.
- Socin, A. (1879). "Alphabetisches Verzeichniss von Ortschaften des Paschalik Jerusalem". Zeitschrift des Deutschen Palästina-Vereins. 2: 135–163.
- Spyridon, S. N. (1938). "Annals of Palestine". Journal of the Palestine Oriental Society. XVIII: 65–111.
- Strange, le, G. (1890). Palestine Under the Moslems: A Description of Syria and the Holy Land from A.D. 650 to 1500. London: Committee of the Palestine Exploration Fund. OCLC 1004386.
- Toledano, E. (1984). "The Sanjaq of Jerusalem in the Sixteenth Century: Aspects of Topography and Population". Archivum Ottomanicum. 9: 279–319. Archived from the original on 5 March 2016.
