= Csongrád =

- Town
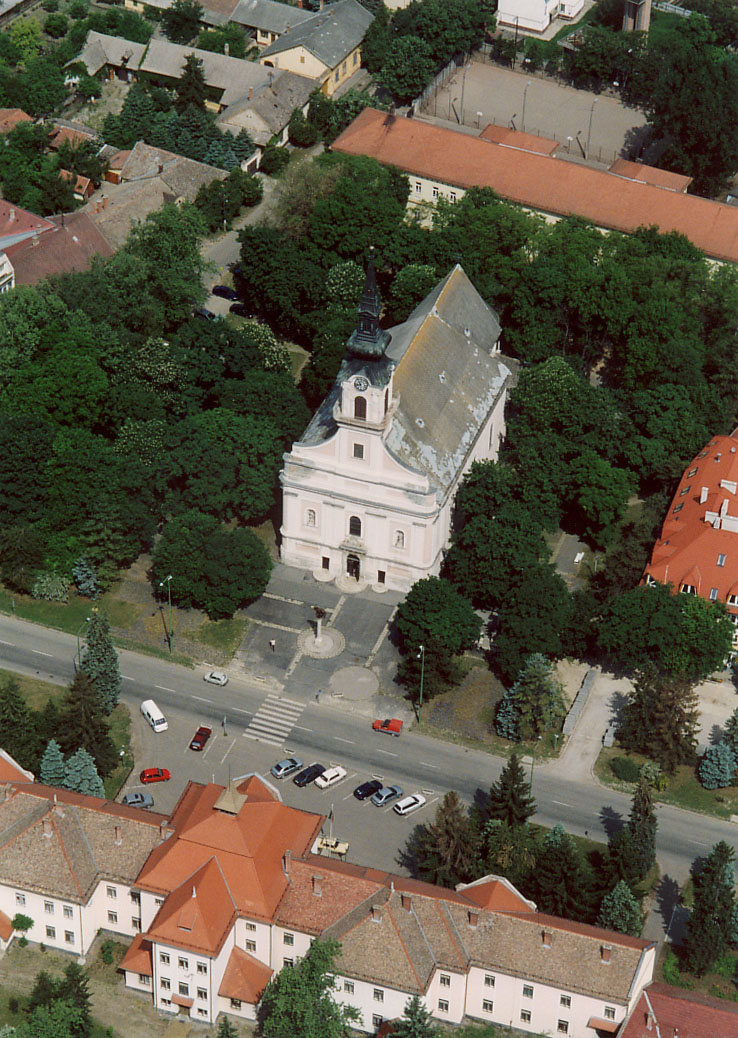
- Nagyboldogasszony (Holy Virgin) Church

- Flag Coat of arms

- Location within Csongrád County Location within Hungary
- Coordinates: 46°42′40.64″N 20°8′25.01″E
- Country: Hungary
- County: Csongrád-Csanád
- District: Csongrád (district)
- Boroughs: List: Csongrád-Bokros

Government
  - Mayor: Tamás Bedő (Independent)
  - Deputy mayor: Attila Máté (Fidesz-KDNP)
  - Notary: Dr. László Juhász

Area
  - Total: 183.683 km^{2} (70.920 sq mi)
  - Csongrád: 9.65 km^{2} (3.73 sq mi)
  - Csongrád-Bokros: 0.083 km^{2} (0.032 sq mi)
- Elevation: 83 m (272 ft)

Population (2009)
  - Total: 17,686
  - Density: 107.61/km^{2} (278.7/sq mi)

Ethnic groups
  - Hungarian: 18653
  - Gypsy: 89
  - German: 19
  - Ukrainian: 8
  - Others: 18
- Time zone: UTC+1 (CET)
  - Summer (DST): UTC+2 (CEST)
- Postal code: 6640
- Area code: (+36) 63
- Website: www.csongrad.hu

Csongrád (Romanian: Ciongrad; Turkish: Conğrad Serbian: Чонград, romanized: Čongrad, archaically also Црноград/Crnograd, German: Tschongrad) is a town in Csongrád County in southern Hungary.

== History ==
At the time of the Hungarian Conquest (the end of 9th century) the Maros Valley was under Bulgarian control. The fortress was known as Chorniy Grad (Slavic term for 'black castle') and served as a Bulgarian-Slavic guard outpost. Later King Stephen (1000–1038) made the town a state administration center, giving its name to a county. It remained a county seat till the Mongol invasion of Hungary (1240–42). The town and fortress were badly damaged by the Mongols; king Béla IV subsequently transferred the county seat to Szeged in 1247. The move significantly affected Csongrád's recovery. It did not become a town again until 1920.

== Main sights ==
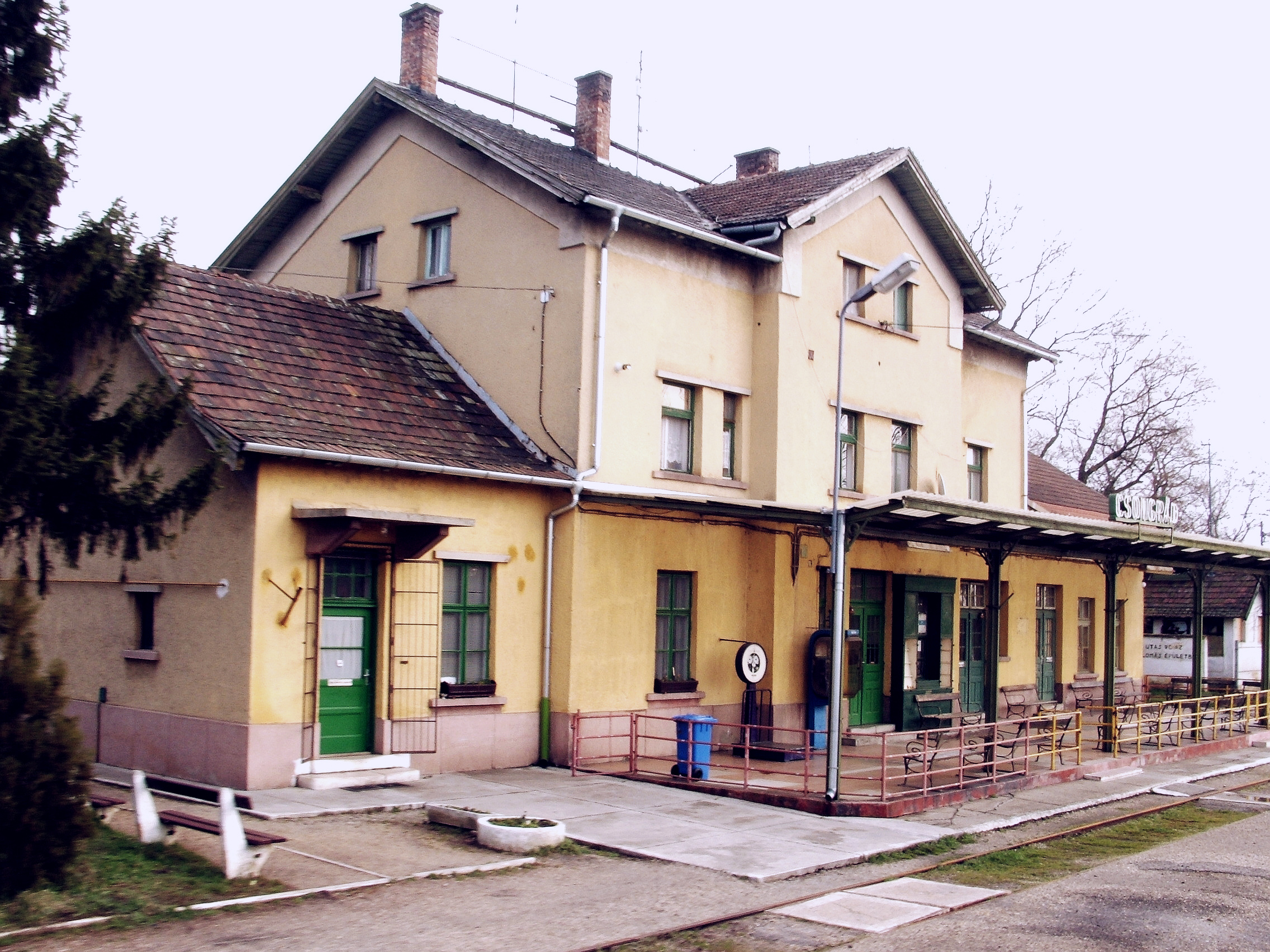
The railway station

The Main Square obtained its definitive shape in the first half of the 10th century, its streets are wide with many trees. The Main Street is lined by old plane trees.

The road running along the grammar school in Secessionist style leads to the old town. This part of the settlement, called Öregvár (meaning Old Castle), preserves the structure of a Hungarian fishing-village of the 18th century. The adobes and houses with puddle wall have thatched roofs, many of them are equipped inside with modern furniture. One building can be seen with original furniture (at Gyökér utca 1).

The Tisza has a sand-bank which looks like a seashore.

Another attraction of Csongrád is the backwater generated by the river control works (Holt-Tisza), which houses several water-birds. In the wood strip on the left bank of the Tisza are the uncovered ruins of a Benedictine monastery founded in the 11th century.

== Tourism ==
The greatest attraction in Csongrád is the Tisza river bank. The river has a sandy beach and during summer hundreds of people come to bathe in the water. Csongrád has spas and some swimming pools as well, both indoor and outdoor.

Csongrád's museums include:

- Csongrád's traditional style house
- László Tari Museum
- István Széchenyi Elementary School's collection of the region
- Gallery of Csongrád
- Művésztelep (Artists' park)

The permanent exhibition of the museum located in the center of the city presenting a material of town history. Less than 100 meters away, the City Gallery regularly exhibits watercolours by the local painter János Piroska.

There are several churches in Csongrád:

- The Nagyboldogasszony (Holy Virgin) Church - situated in the main town square and built between 1762 and 1769
- Saint Rókus-church
- Piroskavárosi Saint Joseph Church Franciscan Abbey

There are two main festivals in the summer time:

- Csongrád Wine Festival, which is usually last for 3–4 days
- Körös-Toroki Days which lasts for a week

== Notable people ==
- Miloš Crnjanski, Serbian writer
- Geca Kon, Serbian publisher
- Pál Maléter, military leader
- Károly Csemegi, judge

== Twin towns – sister cities ==
Csongrád is twinned with:

- Bečej, Serbia
- Bełchatów, Poland
- Breuilaufa, France
- Le Buis, France
- Chamboret, France
- Chaptelat, France
- Nantiat, France
- Nieul, France
- Raisio, Finland
- Saint-Jouvent, France
- Thouron, France
- Vaulry, France

Csongrád also cooperates with Berehove, Ukraine.

== Gallery ==
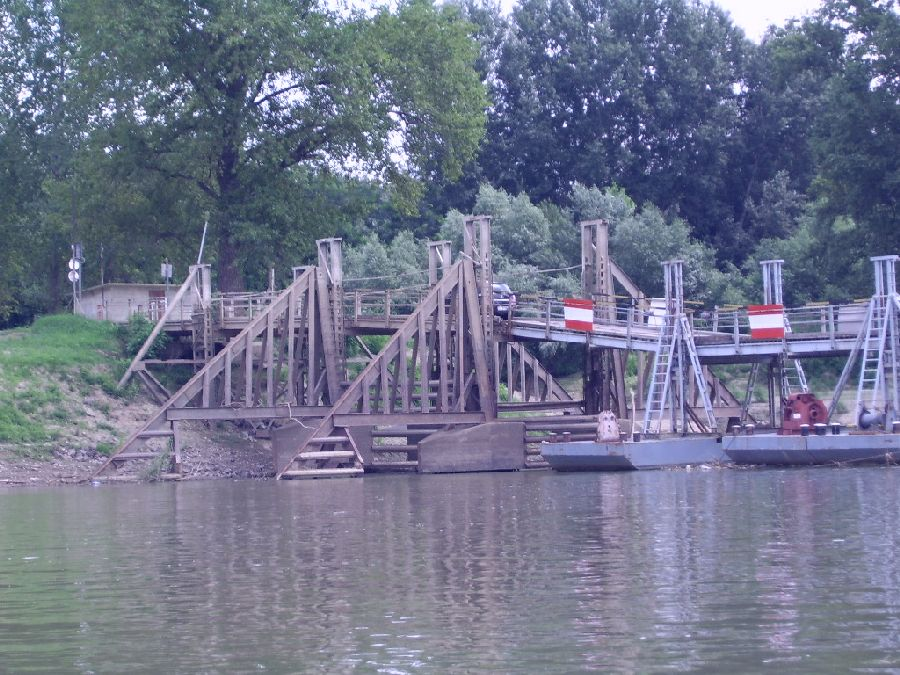
Pontoon bridge between Csongrád and Csépa

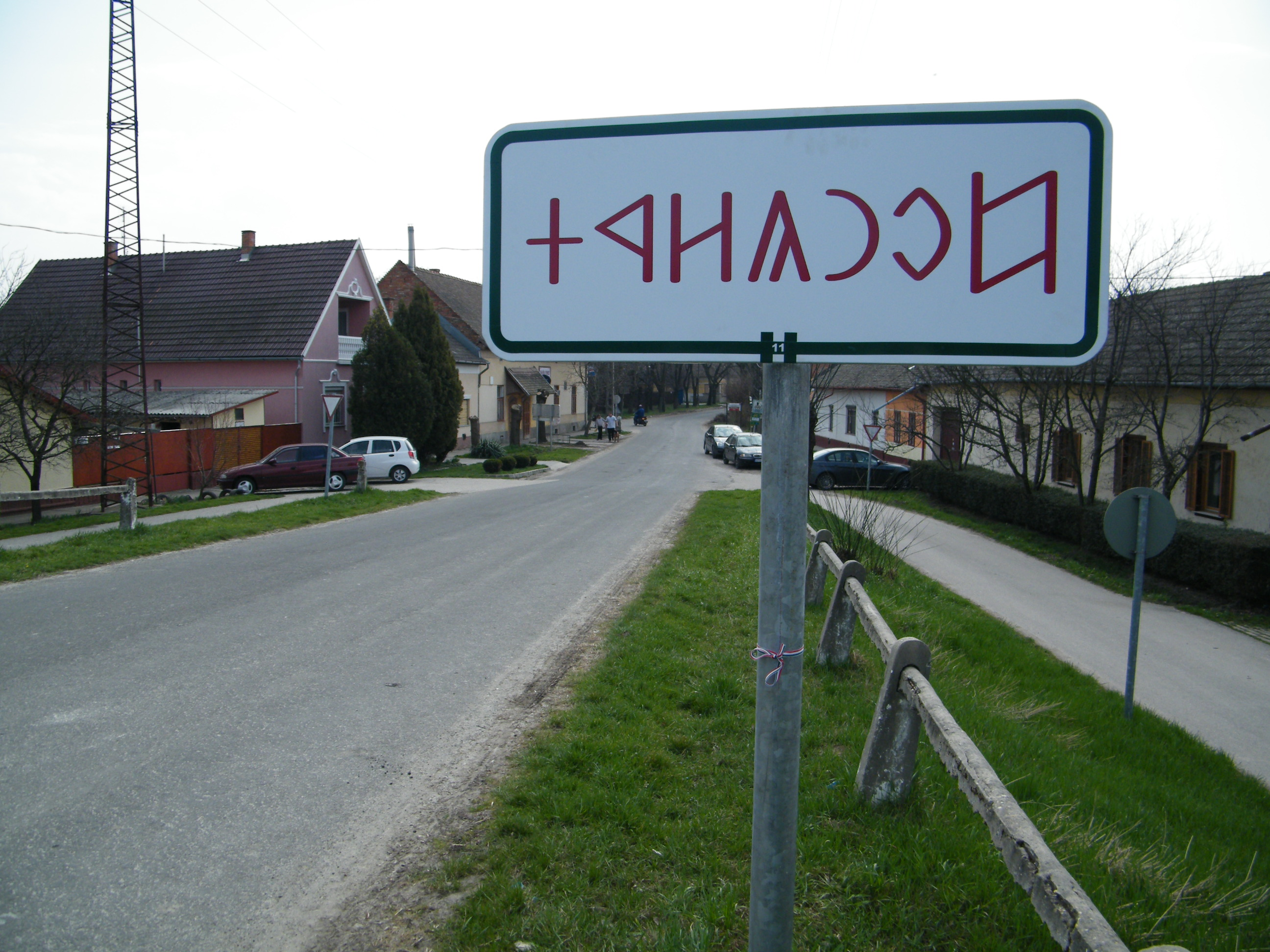
Rovas city limit sign near the pontoon bridge, featuring Hungarian runes

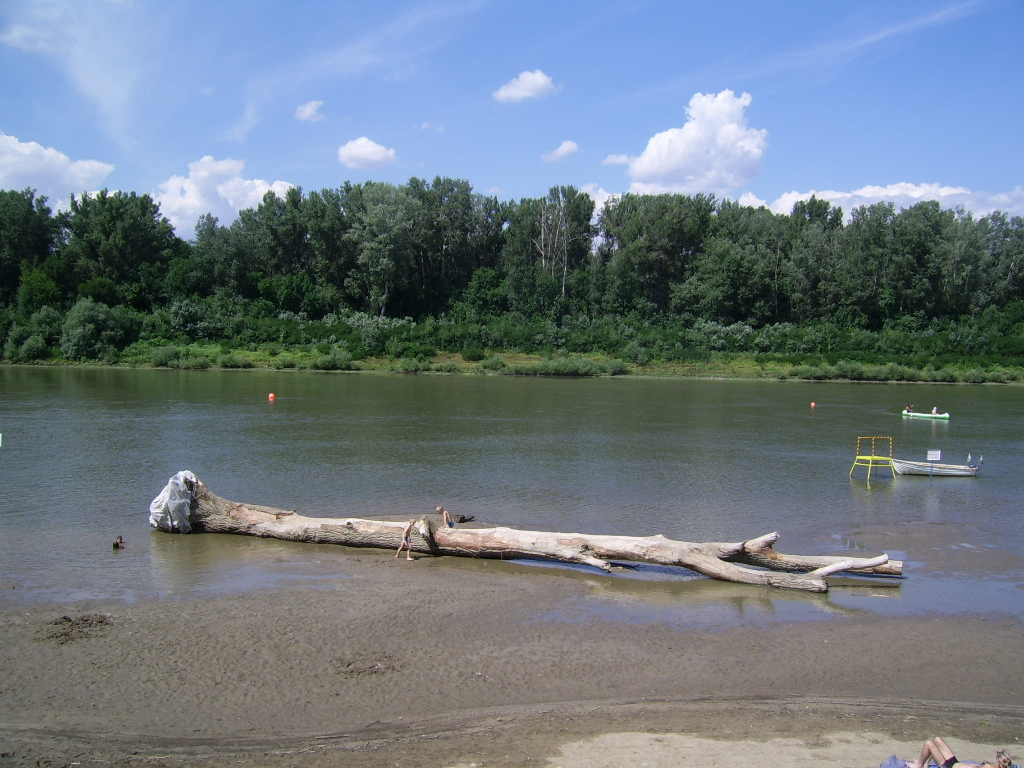
Sandbank of the Tisza river near Csongrád
