= Monts de Blond =

Mountain in France

Coordinates: 46°00′25″N 1°00′18″E

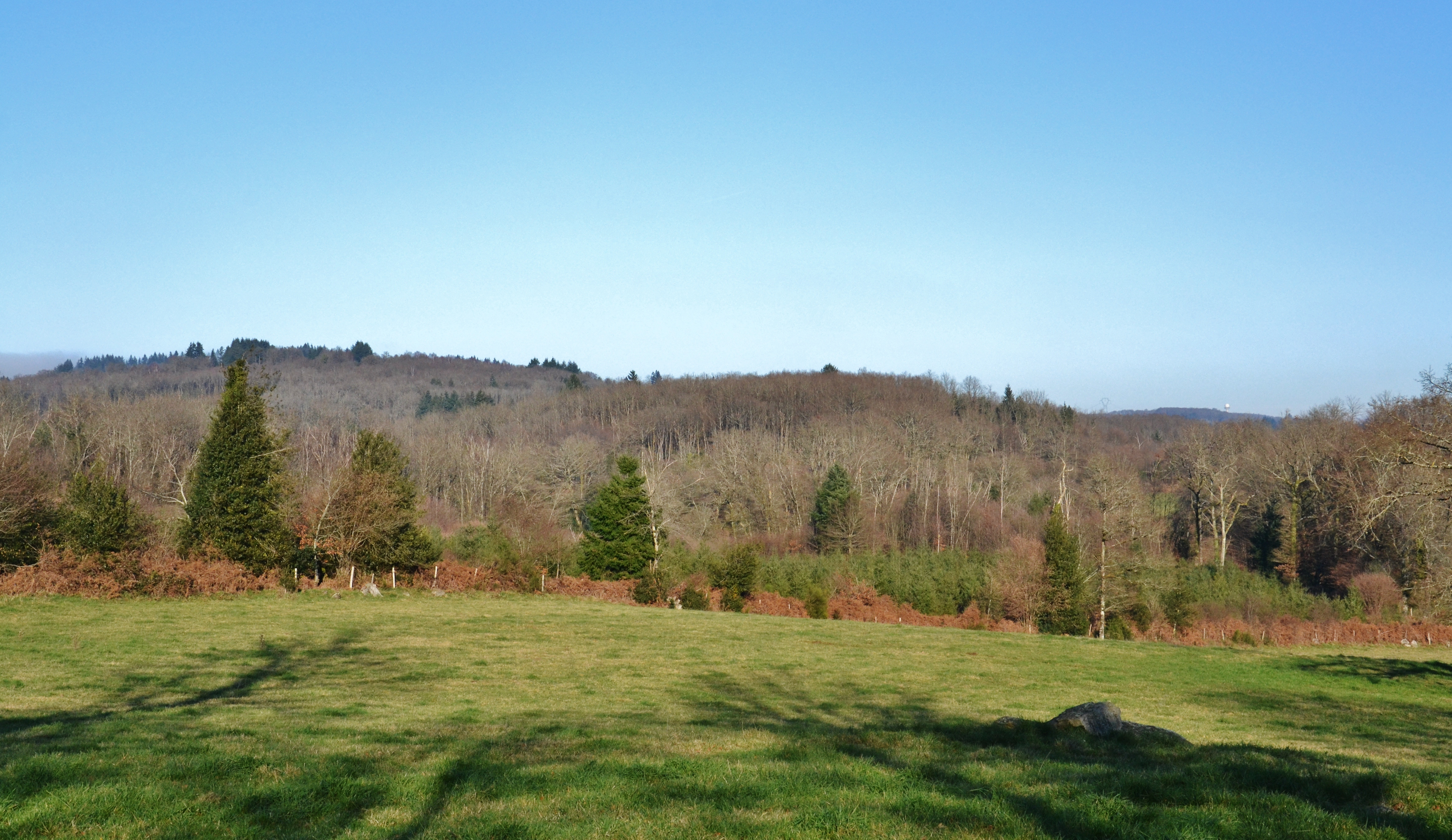
View of the massif from the west.

The Monts de Blond are a small French low mountain massif belonging to the Massif Central, located to the west of the Haute-Vienne department, on the border with the Charente department.

Among the western foothills of the Massif Central, they are the first to exceed 400 meters in altitude coming from the Atlantic coast. Situated between the towns of Bellac and Saint-Junien, they form the western part of the.

== Geography ==
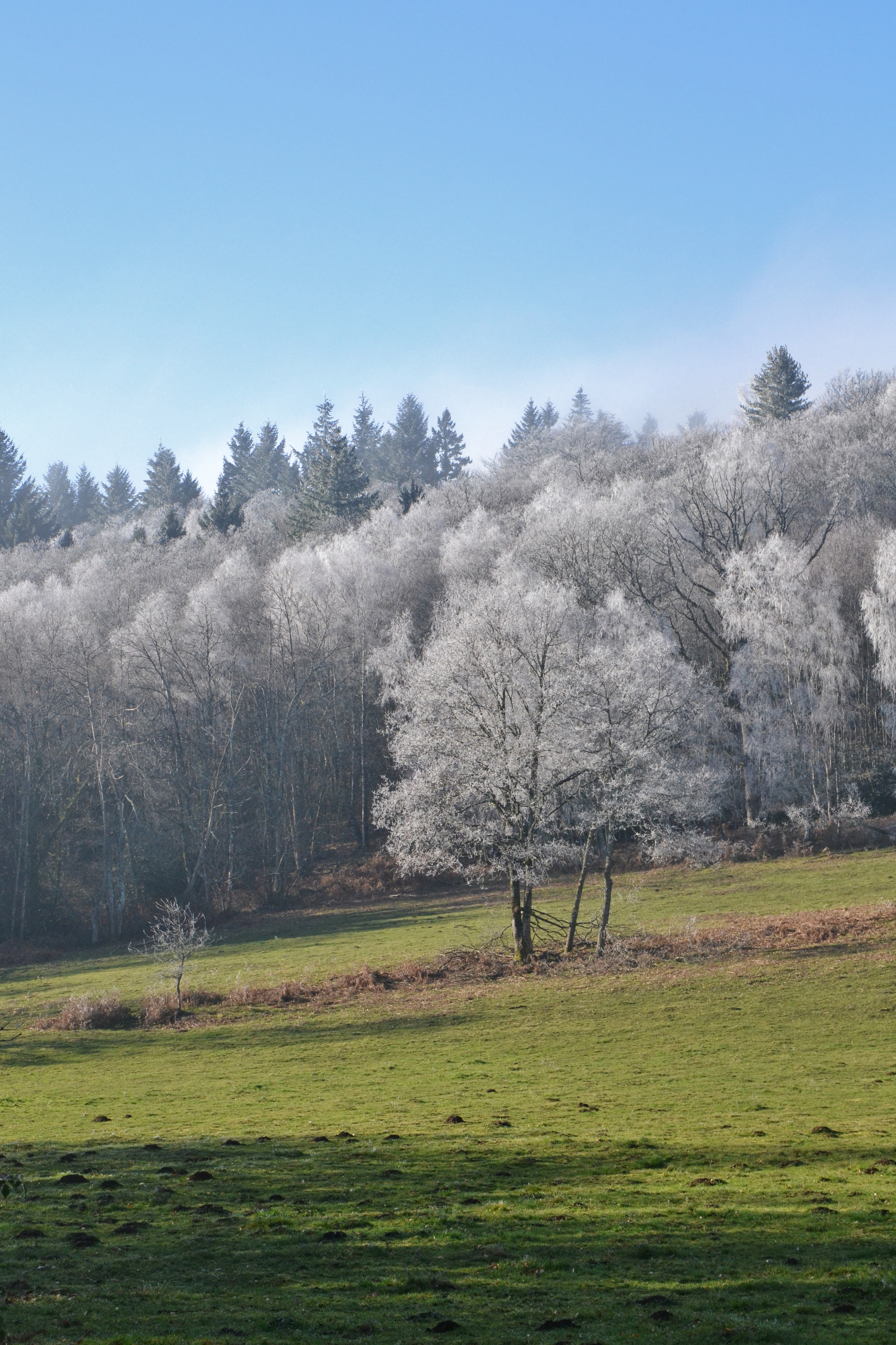
Winter landscape near Vaulry.

It is a small area in the Haute-Vienne department, about fifteen kilometers from east to west and six from north to south, located about thirty kilometers northwest of Limoges, in the western part of the department. The foothills of the massif extend into the neighboring Charente department, mainly in the communes of Montrollet (Rocher aux Oiseaux, 368 m) and Saint-Christophe (340 m). The massif is more rugged in the east and north than in the west. It is one of the westernmost elevations of the Massif Central, after the massif de l'Arbre, in Charente.

The massif rises to 514 meters at two points: the first, Les Marcoux, between the localities of Le Charlet and La Bétoulle, and the second, Les Chapus, near the hamlet of La Bachellerie, both located in the commune of Blond. It straddles the communes of Blond, Bussière-Boffy, Chamboret, Cieux, Montrol-Sénard, Mortemart, Nouic, and Vaulry in Haute-Vienne, as well as Montrollet and Saint-Christophe in Charente. Despite its modest altitude, it stands clearly elevated above the surrounding countryside, which is generally between 250 and 300 meters in elevation.

Several rivers originate in the massif, including the Marchadaine and the Issoire.

The landscape is primarily composed of deciduous woods and meadows surrounding the villages. The Monts de Blond are known for housing numerous menhirs and dolmens from the Neolithic period, as well as numerous granite chaos formations. These stones have evocative names such as "fairy rocks," "mushroom," "wobbling stone" from Boscartus, "sacrificial stone," and more. One of these granite chaos formations, the rochers de Puychaud, features a plaque in memory of Frédéric Mistral. However, this plaque does not mark the boundary between the Occitan and Langue d'oïl regions, as stated, which is located a few dozen kilometers further north.

The Monts de Blond retain some dry heathlands, such as at butte de Frochet in Val d'Issoire and Ceinturat, as well as some peat bogs like the Pioffret bog. These sites constitute ZNIEFF. Since 1977 (with an extension in 2003), the entire massif has been classified as a protected natural site for its landscape interest, including its villages and ecosystems.
