= Blanzac =

Blanzac is the name or part of the name of the following communes in France:

- Blanzac, Haute-Loire, in the Haute-Loire department
- Blanzac, Haute-Vienne, in the Haute-Vienne department
- Blanzac-lès-Matha, in the Charente-Maritime department
- Blanzac-Porcheresse, in the Charente department
