= Saint-Bonnet-de-Bellac =

- Commune
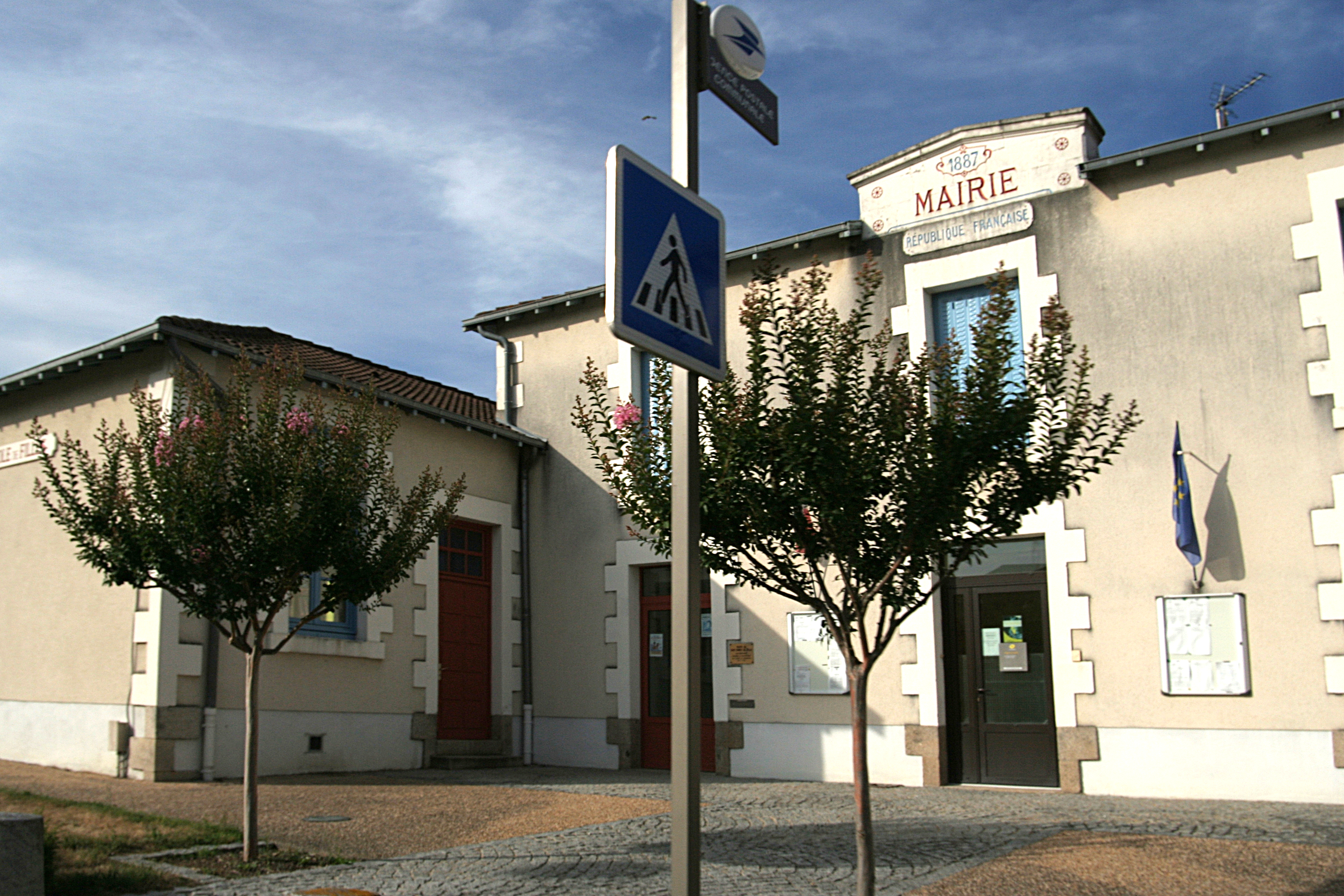
- The town hall in Saint-Bonnet-de-Bellac
- Location of Saint-Bonnet-de-Bellac
- Location within France Location within Nouvelle-Aquitaine
- Coordinates: 46°10′10″N 0°57′19″E
- Country: France
- Region: Nouvelle-Aquitaine
- Department: Haute-Vienne
- Arrondissement: Bellac
- Canton: Bellac

Government
  - Mayor (2020–2026): Jean-Claude Boulle
- Area^{1}: 34.51 km^{2} (13.32 sq mi)
- Highest elevation: 271 m (889 ft)
- Lowest elevation: 148 m (486 ft)
- Population (2023): 452
  - Density: 13.1/km^{2} (33.9/sq mi)
- Time zone: UTC+01:00 (CET)
  - Summer (DST): UTC+02:00 (CEST)
- INSEE/Postal code: 87139 /87300
- ^{1} French Land Register data, which excludes lakes, ponds, glaciers > 1 km^{2} (0.386 sq mi or 247 acres) and river estuaries.

Saint-Bonnet-de-Bellac (French pronunciation: [sɛ̃ bɔnɛ də bɛlak], literally Saint-Bonnet of Bellac; Limousin: Sent Bonet de Belac) is a commune in the Haute-Vienne department in the Nouvelle-Aquitaine region in west-central France.

== See also ==
- Communes of the Haute-Vienne department
