= Arrondissement of Bellac =

Coordinates: 46.12°N 1.05°E

Bellac
- Arrondissement
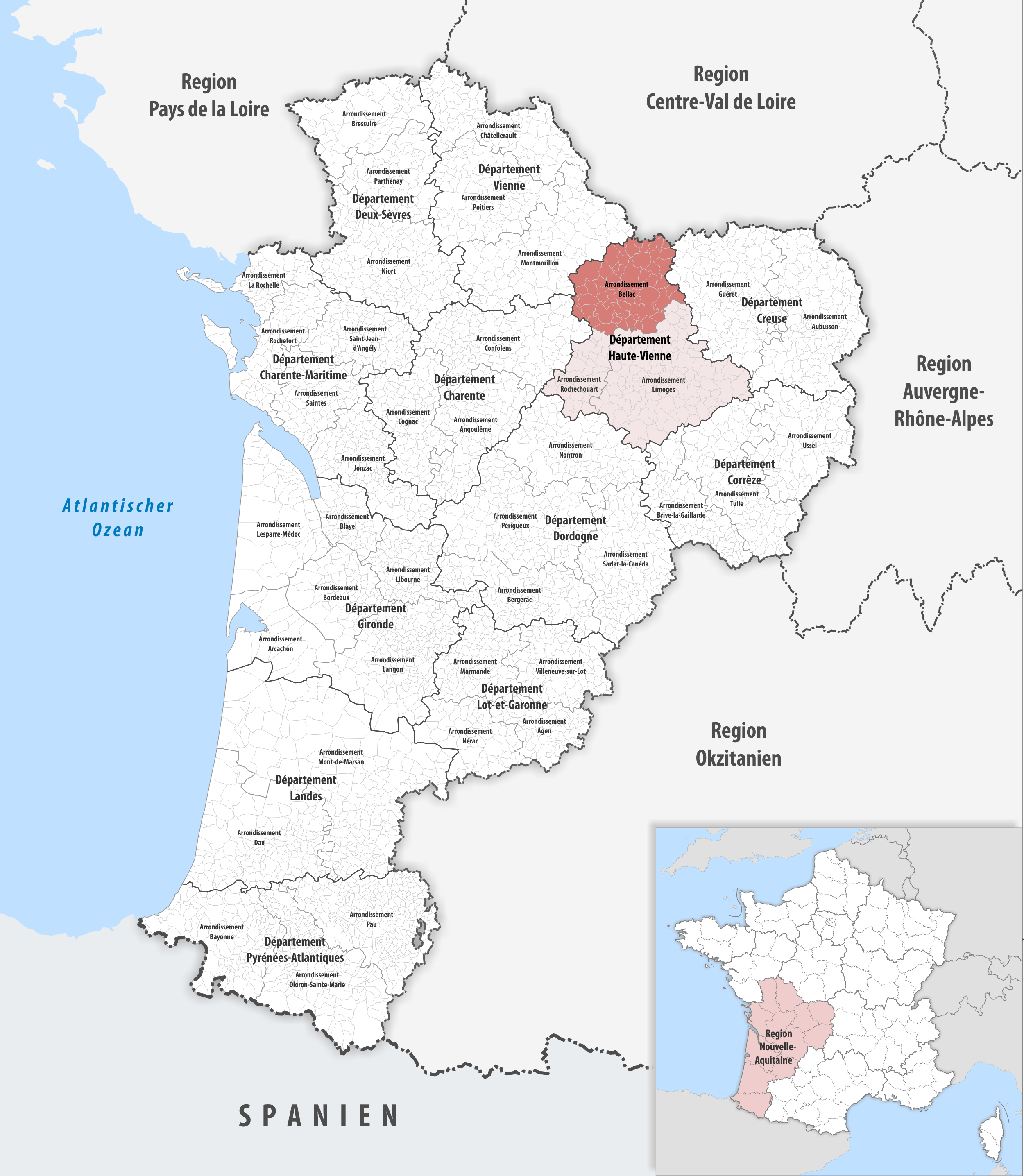
- Location within the region Nouvelle-Aquitaine
- Country: France
- Region: Nouvelle-Aquitaine
- Department: Haute-Vienne
- No. of communes: {{{nbcomm}}}
- Area: 1,779.9 km^{2} (687.2 sq mi)
- Population (2023): 37,801
  - Density: 21.238/km^{2} (55.005/sq mi)
- INSEE code: 871

The Arrondissement of Bellac is an arrondissement of France in the Haute-Vienne department in the Nouvelle-Aquitaine region. It has 57 communes. Its population is 37,903 (2021), and its area is 1,779.9 km^{2} (687.2 sq mi).

== Composition ==
The communes of the arrondissement of Bellac, and their INSEE codes, are:

1. Arnac-la-Poste (87003)
2. Azat-le-Ris (87006)
3. Balledent (87007)
4. La Bazeuge (87008)
5. Bellac (87011)
6. Berneuil (87012)
7. Bessines-sur-Gartempe (87014)
8. Blanzac (87017)
9. Blond (87018)
10. Breuilaufa (87022)
11. Le Buis (87023)
12. Chamboret (87033)
13. Châteauponsac (87041)
14. Cieux (87045)
15. Compreignac (87047)
16. La Croix-sur-Gartempe (87052)
17. Cromac (87053)
18. Dinsac (87056)
19. Dompierre-les-Églises (87057)
20. Le Dorat (87059)
21. Droux (87061)
22. Folles (87067)
23. Fromental (87068)
24. Gajoubert (87069)
25. Les Grands-Chézeaux (87074)
26. Jouac (87080)
27. Lussac-les-Églises (87087)
28. Magnac-Laval (87089)
29. Mailhac-sur-Benaize (87090)
30. Montrol-Sénard (87100)
31. Mortemart (87101)
32. Nantiat (87103)
33. Nouic (87108)
34. Oradour-Saint-Genest (87109)
35. Peyrat-de-Bellac (87116)
36. Rancon (87121)
37. Razès (87122)
38. Saint-Amand-Magnazeix (87133)
39. Saint-Bonnet-de-Bellac (87139)
40. Saint-Georges-les-Landes (87145)
41. Saint-Hilaire-la-Treille (87149)
42. Saint-Junien-les-Combes (87155)
43. Saint-Léger-Magnazeix (87160)
44. Saint-Martial-sur-Isop (87163)
45. Saint-Martin-le-Mault (87165)
46. Saint-Ouen-sur-Gartempe (87172)
47. Saint-Pardoux-le-Lac (87128)
48. Saint-Sornin-la-Marche (87179)
49. Saint-Sornin-Leulac (87180)
50. Saint-Sulpice-les-Feuilles (87182)
51. Tersannes (87195)
52. Thouron (87197)
53. Val-d'Issoire (87097)
54. Val-d'Oire-et-Gartempe (87028)
55. Vaulry (87198)
56. Verneuil-Moustiers (87200)
57. Villefavard (87206)

== History ==
The arrondissement of Bellac was created in 1800.

As a result of the reorganisation of the cantons of France which came into effect in 2015, the borders of the cantons are no longer related to the borders of the arrondissements. The cantons of the arrondissement of Bellac were, as of January 2015:

1. Bellac
2. Bessines-sur-Gartempe
3. Châteauponsac
4. Le Dorat
5. Magnac-Laval
6. Mézières-sur-Issoire
7. Nantiat
8. Saint-Sulpice-les-Feuilles

== Gallery ==
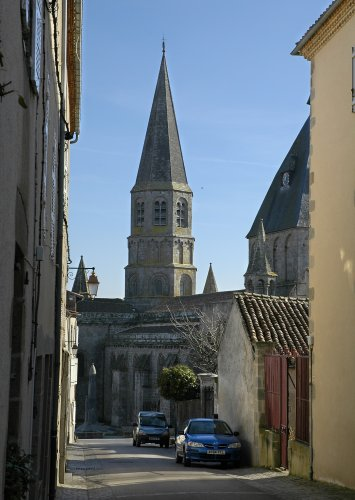
The spire of the Collégiale church in Le Dorat.

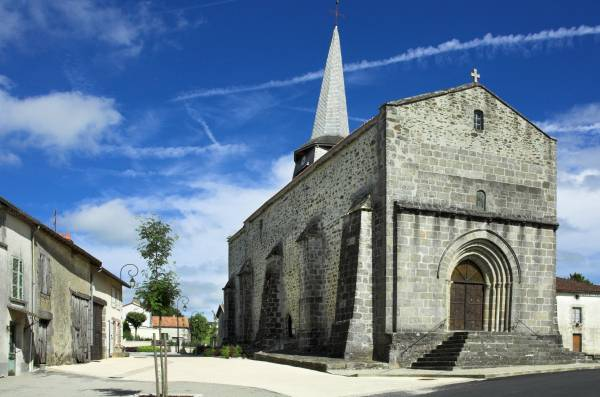
The village of Darnac.

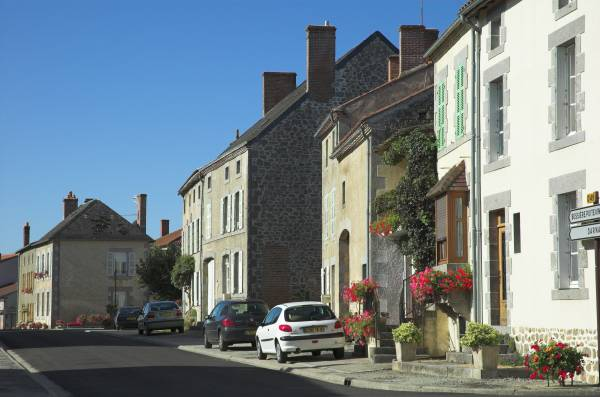
The village of Thiat.

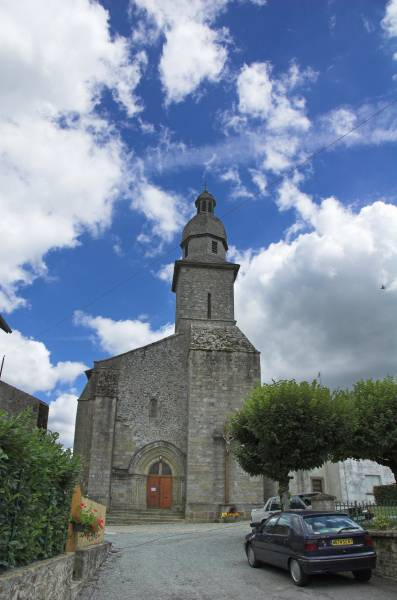
The church of Rancon.

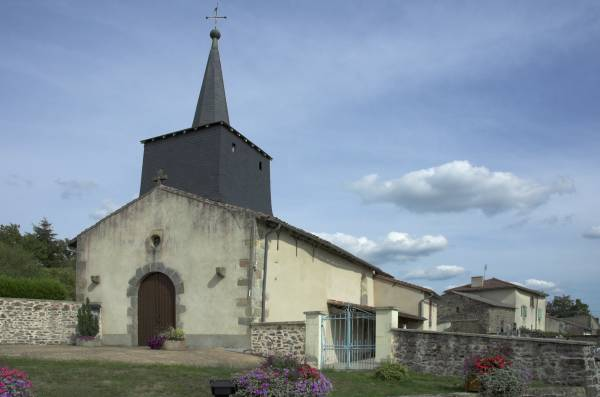
The church of Ouen-sur-Gartempe.

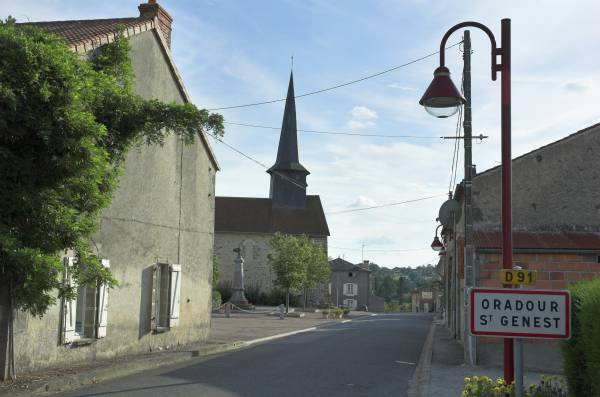
The village of Oradour-St-Genest.
