= Peyrat =

== Places ==
Peyrat may refer to the several places in France:

- Peyrat-de-Bellac, Haute-Vienne
- Peyrat-la-Nonière, Creuse
- Peyrat-le-Château, Haute-Vienne
- Le Peyrat, Ariège

== Persons ==
- Jacques Peyrat
- Napoléon Peyrat
