= Saint-Junien-les-Combes =

- Commune
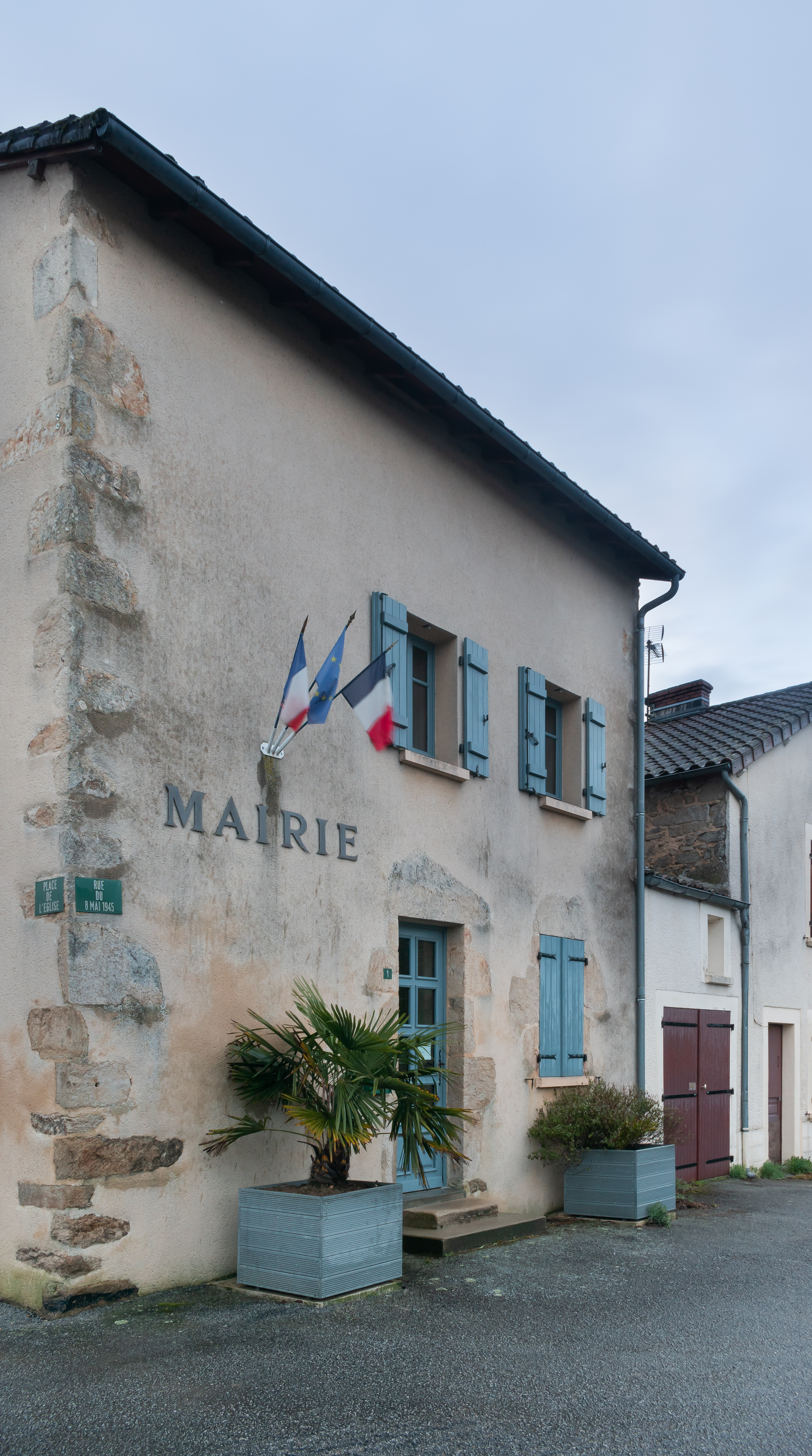
- The town hall of Saint-Junien-les-Combes
- Location of Saint-Junien-les-Combes
- Location within France Location within Nouvelle-Aquitaine
- Coordinates: 46°05′15″N 1°07′26″E
- Country: France
- Region: Nouvelle-Aquitaine
- Department: Haute-Vienne
- Arrondissement: Bellac
- Canton: Bellac
- Intercommunality: Haut-Limousin en Marche

Government
  - Mayor (2020–2026): Vincent Damar
- Area^{1}: 20.59 km^{2} (7.95 sq mi)
- Highest elevation: 307 m (1,007 ft)
- Lowest elevation: 223 m (732 ft)
- Population (2023): 170
  - Density: 8.3/km^{2} (21/sq mi)
- Time zone: UTC+01:00 (CET)
  - Summer (DST): UTC+02:00 (CEST)
- INSEE/Postal code: 87155 /87300
- ^{1} French Land Register data, which excludes lakes, ponds, glaciers > 1 km^{2} (0.386 sq mi or 247 acres) and river estuaries.

Saint-Junien-les-Combes (French pronunciation: [sɛ̃ ʒynjɛ̃ le kɔ̃b]; Occitan: Sent Junian or Lo Pitit Sent Junian) is a commune in the Haute-Vienne department in the Nouvelle-Aquitaine region in west-central France.

== See also ==
- Communes of the Haute-Vienne department
