= Villefavard =

- Commune
- Coat of arms
- Location of Villefavard
- Location within France Location within Nouvelle-Aquitaine
- Coordinates: 46°10′08″N 1°12′33″E
- Country: France
- Region: Nouvelle-Aquitaine
- Department: Haute-Vienne
- Arrondissement: Bellac
- Canton: Châteauponsac

Government
  - Mayor (2020–2026): Pascal Combecau
- Area^{1}: 9.22 km^{2} (3.56 sq mi)
- Highest elevation: 335 m (1,099 ft)
- Lowest elevation: 215 m (705 ft)
- Population (2023): 154
  - Density: 16.7/km^{2} (43.3/sq mi)
- Time zone: UTC+01:00 (CET)
  - Summer (DST): UTC+02:00 (CEST)
- INSEE/Postal code: 87206 /87190
- ^{1} French Land Register data, which excludes lakes, ponds, glaciers > 1 km^{2} (0.386 sq mi or 247 acres) and river estuaries.

Villefavard (French pronunciation: [vilfavaʁ]; Occitan: Vile Favart) is a commune in the Haute-Vienne department in the Nouvelle-Aquitaine region in west-central France.

== Geography ==
The river Semme forms the commune's southern border.

== Demographics ==
Inhabitants are known as Villefavardais.

== See also ==
- Communes of the Haute-Vienne department
