= Berneuil, Haute-Vienne =

Berneuil
- Commune
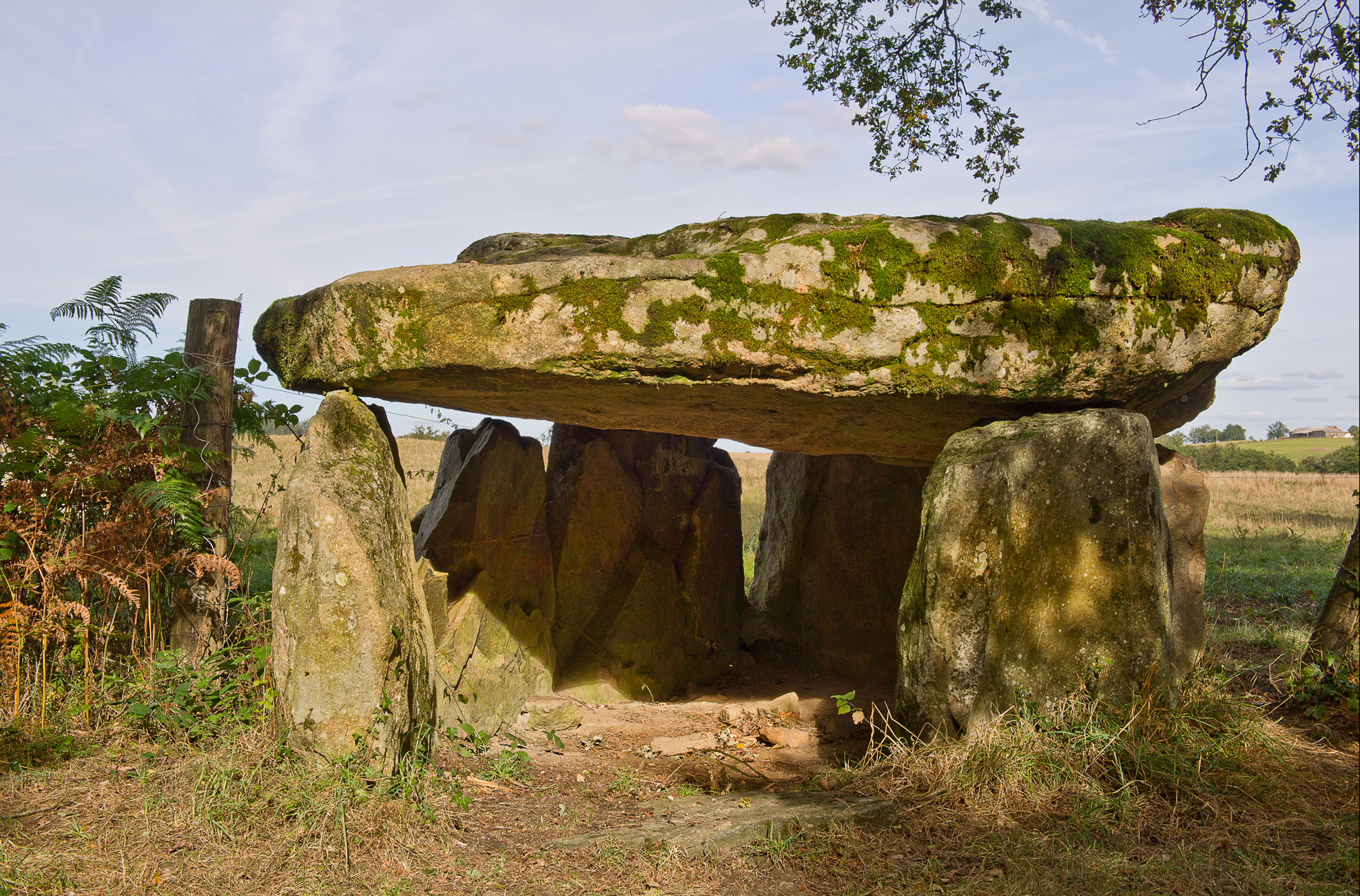
- The dolmen of Berneuil

- Coat of arms
- Location of Berneuil
- Location within France Location within Nouvelle-Aquitaine
- Coordinates: 46°04′11″N 1°06′27″E
- Country: France
- Region: Nouvelle-Aquitaine
- Department: Haute-Vienne
- Arrondissement: Bellac
- Canton: Bellac
- Intercommunality: Haut-Limousin en Marche

Government
  - Mayor (2020–2026): Eliane Boyer
- Area^{1}: 26.09 km^{2} (10.07 sq mi)
- Highest elevation: 321 m (1,053 ft)
- Lowest elevation: 192 m (630 ft)
- Population (2023): 418
  - Density: 16.0/km^{2} (41.5/sq mi)
- Time zone: UTC+01:00 (CET)
  - Summer (DST): UTC+02:00 (CEST)
- INSEE/Postal code: 87012 /87300
- ^{1} French Land Register data, which excludes lakes, ponds, glaciers > 1 km^{2} (0.386 sq mi or 247 acres) and river estuaries.

Berneuil (French pronunciation: [bɛʁnœj]; Occitan: Bernuèlh) is a commune in the Haute-Vienne department in the Nouvelle-Aquitaine region in western France.

Inhabitants are known as Berneuillais.

== See also ==
- Communes of the Haute-Vienne department
