= Tersannes =

- Commune
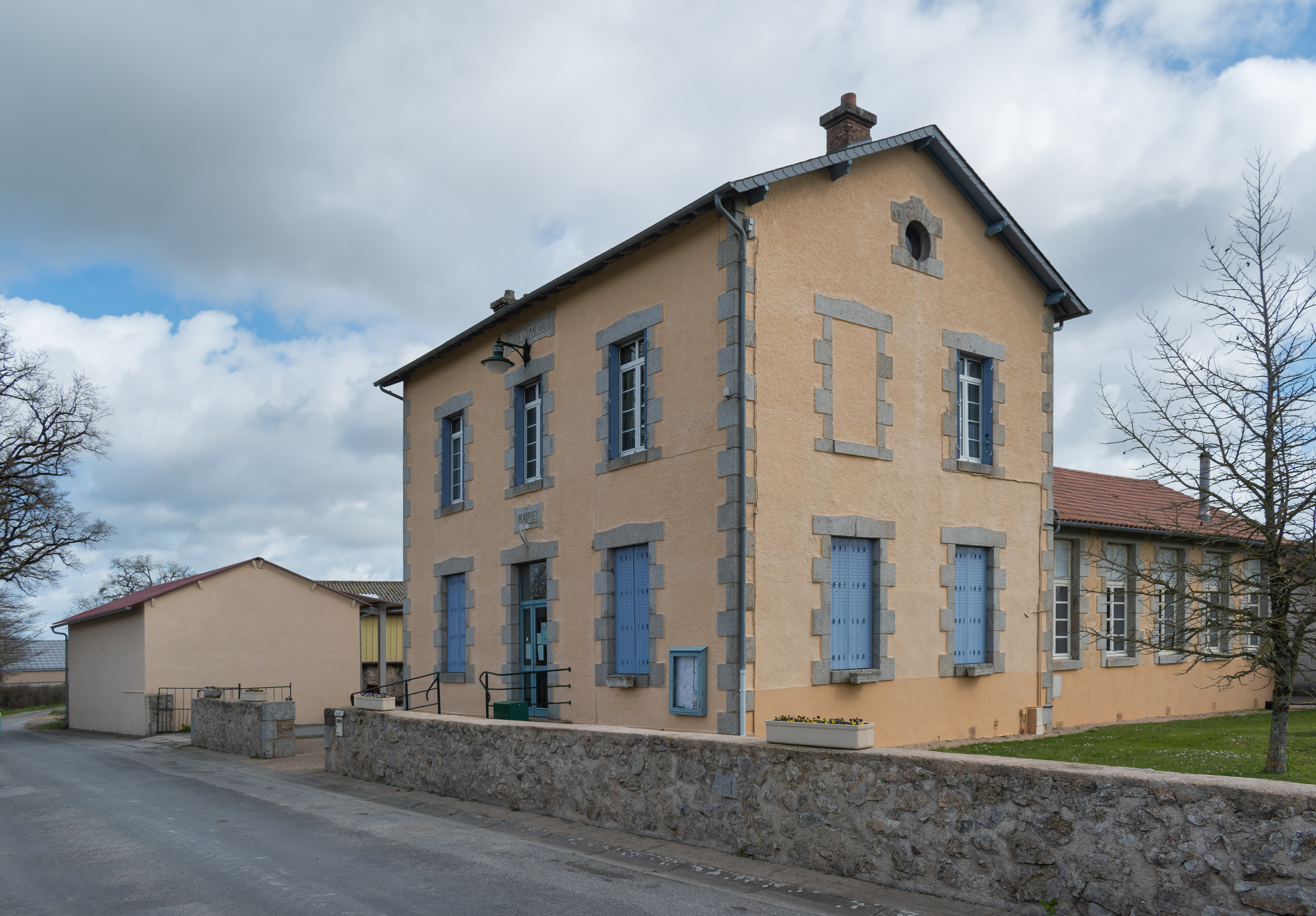
- Town hall of Tersannes
- Location of Tersannes
- Location within France Location within Nouvelle-Aquitaine
- Coordinates: 46°17′54″N 1°07′23″E
- Country: France
- Region: Nouvelle-Aquitaine
- Department: Haute-Vienne
- Arrondissement: Bellac
- Canton: Châteauponsac

Government
  - Mayor (2020–2026): Virginie Filloux
- Area^{1}: 24.64 km^{2} (9.51 sq mi)
- Highest elevation: 282 m (925 ft)
- Lowest elevation: 196 m (643 ft)
- Population (2023): 126
  - Density: 5.11/km^{2} (13.2/sq mi)
- Time zone: UTC+01:00 (CET)
  - Summer (DST): UTC+02:00 (CEST)
- INSEE/Postal code: 87195 /87360
- ^{1} French Land Register data, which excludes lakes, ponds, glaciers > 1 km^{2} (0.386 sq mi or 247 acres) and river estuaries.

Tersannes (French pronunciation: [tɛʁsan]; Occitan: Terçanes) is a commune in the Haute-Vienne department in the Nouvelle-Aquitaine region in west-central France.

Inhabitants are known as Tersannauds.

== See also ==
- Communes of the Haute-Vienne department
