= Saint-Hilaire-la-Treille =

- Commune
- Location of Saint-Hilaire-la-Treille
- Location within France Location within Nouvelle-Aquitaine
- Coordinates: 46°15′07″N 1°19′10″E
- Country: France
- Region: Nouvelle-Aquitaine
- Department: Haute-Vienne
- Arrondissement: Bellac
- Canton: Châteauponsac

Government
  - Mayor (2020–2026): Odile Berger
- Area^{1}: 29.14 km^{2} (11.25 sq mi)
- Highest elevation: 348 m (1,142 ft)
- Lowest elevation: 256 m (840 ft)
- Population (2023): 361
  - Density: 12.4/km^{2} (32.1/sq mi)
- Time zone: UTC+01:00 (CET)
  - Summer (DST): UTC+02:00 (CEST)
- INSEE/Postal code: 87149 /87190
- ^{1} French Land Register data, which excludes lakes, ponds, glaciers > 1 km^{2} (0.386 sq mi or 247 acres) and river estuaries.

Saint-Hilaire-la-Treille (French pronunciation: [sɛ̃.t‿ilɛʁ la tʁɛj]; Occitan: Sent Ilaire lo Treilla) is a commune in the Haute-Vienne department in the Nouvelle-Aquitaine region in west-central France.

== Geography ==
The river Brame flows westward through the commune's southern part.

== See also ==
- Communes of the Haute-Vienne department
