= Compreignac =

- Commune
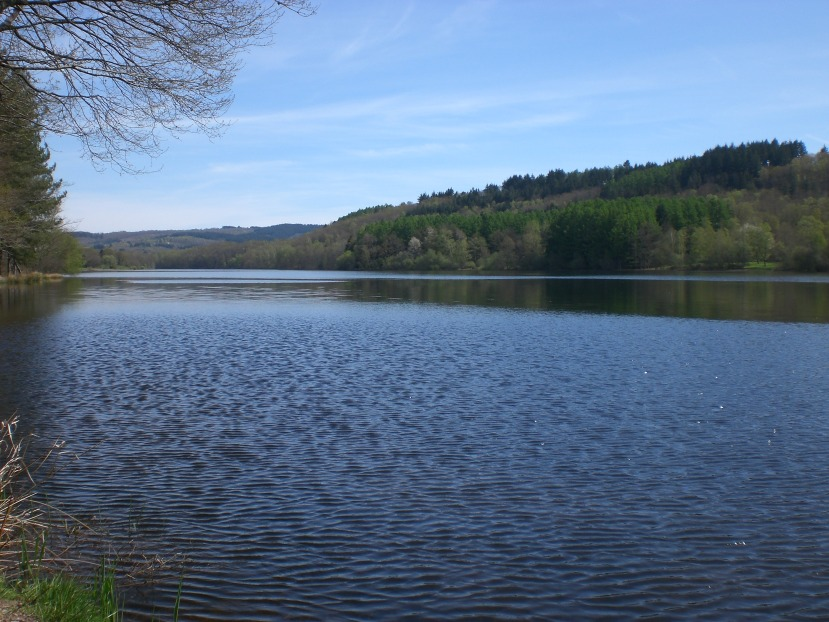
- The Saint-Pardoux Lake, north of the village of Compreignac

- Coat of arms
- Location of Compreignac
- Location within France Location within Nouvelle-Aquitaine
- Coordinates: 45°59′34″N 1°16′32″E
- Country: France
- Region: Nouvelle-Aquitaine
- Department: Haute-Vienne
- Arrondissement: Bellac
- Canton: Bellac

Government
  - Mayor (2020–2026): Jacques Pleinevert
- Area^{1}: 47.62 km^{2} (18.39 sq mi)
- Highest elevation: 587 m (1,926 ft)
- Lowest elevation: 301 m (988 ft)
- Population (2023): 1,856
  - Density: 38.98/km^{2} (100.9/sq mi)
- Time zone: UTC+01:00 (CET)
  - Summer (DST): UTC+02:00 (CEST)
- INSEE/Postal code: 87047 /87140
- ^{1} French Land Register data, which excludes lakes, ponds, glaciers > 1 km^{2} (0.386 sq mi or 247 acres) and river estuaries.

Compreignac (French pronunciation: [kɔ̃pʁɛɲak]; Occitan: Comprenhac) is a commune in the Haute-Vienne department in the Nouvelle-Aquitaine region in western France.

Inhabitants are known as Compreignacois in French.

== Geography ==
The commune covers 4,762 hectares. Compreignac is located 20 km (12 mi) to the north of the city of Limoges, approximately 10 minute travel along the Autoroute A20.

== See also ==
- Communes of the Haute-Vienne department
