= Saint-Martial-sur-Isop =

- Commune
- Location of Saint-Martial-sur-Isop
- Location within France Location within Nouvelle-Aquitaine
- Coordinates: 46°10′06″N 0°51′03″E
- Country: France
- Region: Nouvelle-Aquitaine
- Department: Haute-Vienne
- Arrondissement: Bellac
- Canton: Bellac
- Intercommunality: Haut-Limousin en Marche

Government
  - Mayor (2020–2026): Pierre Bachellerie
- Area^{1}: 23.44 km^{2} (9.05 sq mi)
- Highest elevation: 266 m (873 ft)
- Lowest elevation: 177 m (581 ft)
- Population (2023): 151
  - Density: 6.44/km^{2} (16.7/sq mi)
- Time zone: UTC+01:00 (CET)
  - Summer (DST): UTC+02:00 (CEST)
- INSEE/Postal code: 87163 /87330
- ^{1} French Land Register data, which excludes lakes, ponds, glaciers > 1 km^{2} (0.386 sq mi or 247 acres) and river estuaries.

Saint-Martial-sur-Isop (Occitan: Sent Marçau) is a commune in the Haute-Vienne department in the Nouvelle-Aquitaine region in west-central France.

== See also ==
- Communes of the Haute-Vienne department
