= Communes of the Haute-Vienne department =

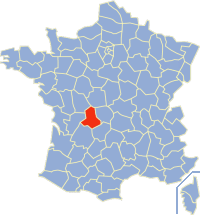

The following is a list of the 195 communes of the Haute-Vienne department of France.

The communes cooperate in the following intercommunalities (as of 2025):

- Communauté urbaine Limoges Métropole
- Communauté de communes Briance-Combade
- Communauté de communes Briance Sud Haute-Vienne
- Communauté de communes Élan Limousin Avenir Nature
- Communauté de communes Gartempe Saint-Pardoux
- Communauté de communes Haut-Limousin en Marche
- Communauté de communes de Noblat
- Communauté de communes Ouest Limousin
- Communauté de communes Pays de Nexon-Monts de Châlus
- Communauté de communes du Pays de Saint-Yrieix (partly)
- Communauté de communes Porte Océane du Limousin
- Communauté de communes des Portes de Vassivière
- Communauté de communes du Val de Vienne

INSEE code	Postal code	Commune
87001	87700	Aixe-sur-Vienne
87002	87240	Ambazac
87003	87160	Arnac-la-Poste
87004	87120	Augne
87005	87220	Aureil
87006	87360	Azat-le-Ris
87007	87290	Balledent
87008	87210	La Bazeuge
87009	87120	Beaumont-du-Lac
87011	87300	Bellac
87012	87300	Berneuil
87013	87370	Bersac-sur-Rivalier
87014	87250	Bessines-sur-Gartempe
87015	87700	Beynac
87016	87340	Les Billanges
87017	87300	Blanzac
87018	87300	Blond
87019	87220	Boisseuil
87020	87270	Bonnac-la-Côte
87021	87110	Bosmie-l'Aiguille
87022	87300	Breuilaufa
87023	87140	Le Buis
87024	87460	Bujaleuf
87025	87800	Burgnac
87027	87230	Bussière-Galant
87029	87230	Les Cars
87030	87200	Chaillac-sur-Vienne
87031	87500	Le Chalard
87032	87230	Châlus
87033	87140	Chamboret
87034	87150	Champagnac-la-Rivière
87035	87400	Champnétery
87036	87230	Champsac
87037	87440	La Chapelle-Montbrandeix
87038	87270	Chaptelat
87039	87380	Château-Chervix
87040	87130	Châteauneuf-la-Forêt
87041	87290	Châteauponsac
87042	87400	Le Châtenet-en-Dognon
87043	87460	Cheissoux
87044	87600	Chéronnac
87045	87520	Cieux
87046	87310	Cognac-la-Forêt
87047	87140	Compreignac
87048	87920	Condat-sur-Vienne
87049	87500	Coussac-Bonneval
87050	87270	Couzeix
87051	87130	La Croisille-sur-Briance
87052	87210	La Croix-sur-Gartempe
87053	87160	Cromac
87054	87150	Cussac
87056	87210	Dinsac
87057	87190	Dompierre-les-Églises
87058	87120	Domps
87059	87210	Le Dorat
87060	87230	Dournazac
87061	87190	Droux
87062	87400	Eybouleuf
87063	87220	Eyjeaux
87064	87120	Eymoutiers
87065	87220	Feytiat
87066	87230	Flavignac
87067	87250	Folles
87068	87250	Fromental
87069	87330	Gajoubert
87070	87400	La Geneytouse
87071	87500	Glandon
87072	87380	Glanges
87073	87310	Gorre
87074	87160	Les Grands-Chézeaux
87075	87170	Isle
87076	87370	Jabreilles-les-Bordes
87077	87800	Janailhac
87078	87520	Javerdat
87079	87340	La Jonchère-Saint-Maurice
87080	87890	Jouac
87081	87800	Jourgnac
87082	87500	Ladignac-le-Long
87083	87370	Laurière
87084	87230	Lavignac
87085	87000	Limoges
87086	87130	Linards
87087	87360	Lussac-les-Églises
87088	87380	Magnac-Bourg
87089	87190	Magnac-Laval
87090	87160	Mailhac-sur-Benaize
87091	87440	Maisonnais-sur-Tardoire
87092	87440	Marval
87093	87130	Masléon
87094	87800	Meilhac
87095	87380	Meuzac
87096	87800	La Meyze
87099	87400	Moissannes
87100	87330	Montrol-Sénard
87101	87330	Mortemart
87103	87140	Nantiat
87104	87120	Nedde

INSEE code	Postal code	Commune
87105	87130	Neuvic-Entier
87106	87800	Nexon
87107	87510	Nieul
87108	87330	Nouic
87109	87210	Oradour-Saint-Genest
87110	87520	Oradour-sur-Glane
87111	87150	Oradour-sur-Vayres
87112	87230	Pageas
87113	87410	Le Palais-sur-Vienne
87114	87350	Panazol
87115	87440	Pensol
87116	87300	Peyrat-de-Bellac
87117	87470	Peyrat-le-Château
87118	87510	Peyrilhac
87119	87260	Pierre-Buffière
87120	87380	La Porcherie
87121	87290	Rancon
87122	87640	Razès
87123	87120	Rempnat
87124	87800	Rilhac-Lastours
87125	87570	Rilhac-Rancon
87126	87600	Rochechouart
87127	87800	La Roche-l'Abeille
87129	87400	Royères
87130	87130	Roziers-Saint-Georges
87131	87720	Saillat-sur-Vienne
87132	87120	Saint-Amand-le-Petit
87133	87290	Saint-Amand-Magnazeix
87135	87310	Saint-Auvent
87137	87150	Saint-Bazile
87138	87260	Saint-Bonnet-Briance
87139	87300	Saint-Bonnet-de-Bellac
87140	87200	Saint-Brice-sur-Vienne
87141	87310	Saint-Cyr
87142	87400	Saint-Denis-des-Murs
87134	87120	Sainte-Anne-Saint-Priest
87162	87420	Sainte-Marie-de-Vaux
87143	87510	Saint-Gence
87144	87260	Saint-Genest-sur-Roselle
87145	87160	Saint-Georges-les-Landes
87146	87380	Saint-Germain-les-Belles
87147	87130	Saint-Gilles-les-Forêts
87148	87260	Saint-Hilaire-Bonneval
87149	87190	Saint-Hilaire-la-Treille
87150	87800	Saint-Hilaire-les-Places
87151	87260	Saint-Jean-Ligoure
87152	87510	Saint-Jouvent
87153	87460	Saint-Julien-le-Petit
87154	87200	Saint-Junien
87155	87300	Saint-Junien-les-Combes
87156	87590	Saint-Just-le-Martel
87157	87340	Saint-Laurent-les-Églises
87158	87310	Saint-Laurent-sur-Gorre
87159	87340	Saint-Léger-la-Montagne
87160	87190	Saint-Léger-Magnazeix
87161	87400	Saint-Léonard-de-Noblat
87163	87330	Saint-Martial-sur-Isop
87164	87200	Saint-Martin-de-Jussac
87165	87360	Saint-Martin-le-Mault
87166	87700	Saint-Martin-le-Vieux
87167	87400	Saint-Martin-Terressus
87168	87440	Saint-Mathieu
87169	87800	Saint-Maurice-les-Brousses
87170	87130	Saint-Méard
87172	87300	Saint-Ouen-sur-Gartempe
87128	87140	Saint-Pardoux-le-Lac
87174	87260	Saint-Paul
87176	87800	Saint-Priest-Ligoure
87177	87700	Saint-Priest-sous-Aixe
87178	87480	Saint-Priest-Taurion
87179	87210	Saint-Sornin-la-Marche
87180	87290	Saint-Sornin-Leulac
87181	87370	Saint-Sulpice-Laurière
87182	87160	Saint-Sulpice-les-Feuilles
87183	87240	Saint-Sylvestre
87185	87420	Saint-Victurnien
87186	87380	Saint-Vitte-sur-Briance
87187	87500	Saint-Yrieix-la-Perche
87188	87700	Saint-Yrieix-sous-Aixe
87189	87440	Les Salles-Lavauguyon
87190	87400	Sauviat-sur-Vige
87191	87620	Séreilhac
87192	87110	Solignac
87193	87130	Surdoux
87194	87130	Sussac
87195	87360	Tersannes
87197	87140	Thouron
87097	87330	Val-d'Issoire
87028	87320	Val-d'Oire-et-Gartempe
87198	87140	Vaulry
87199	87600	Vayres
87200	87360	Verneuil-Moustiers
87201	87430	Verneuil-sur-Vienne
87202	87520	Veyrac
87203	87260	Vicq-sur-Breuilh
87204	87600	Videix
87205	87110	Le Vigen
87206	87190	Villefavard
