= Balledent =

- Commune
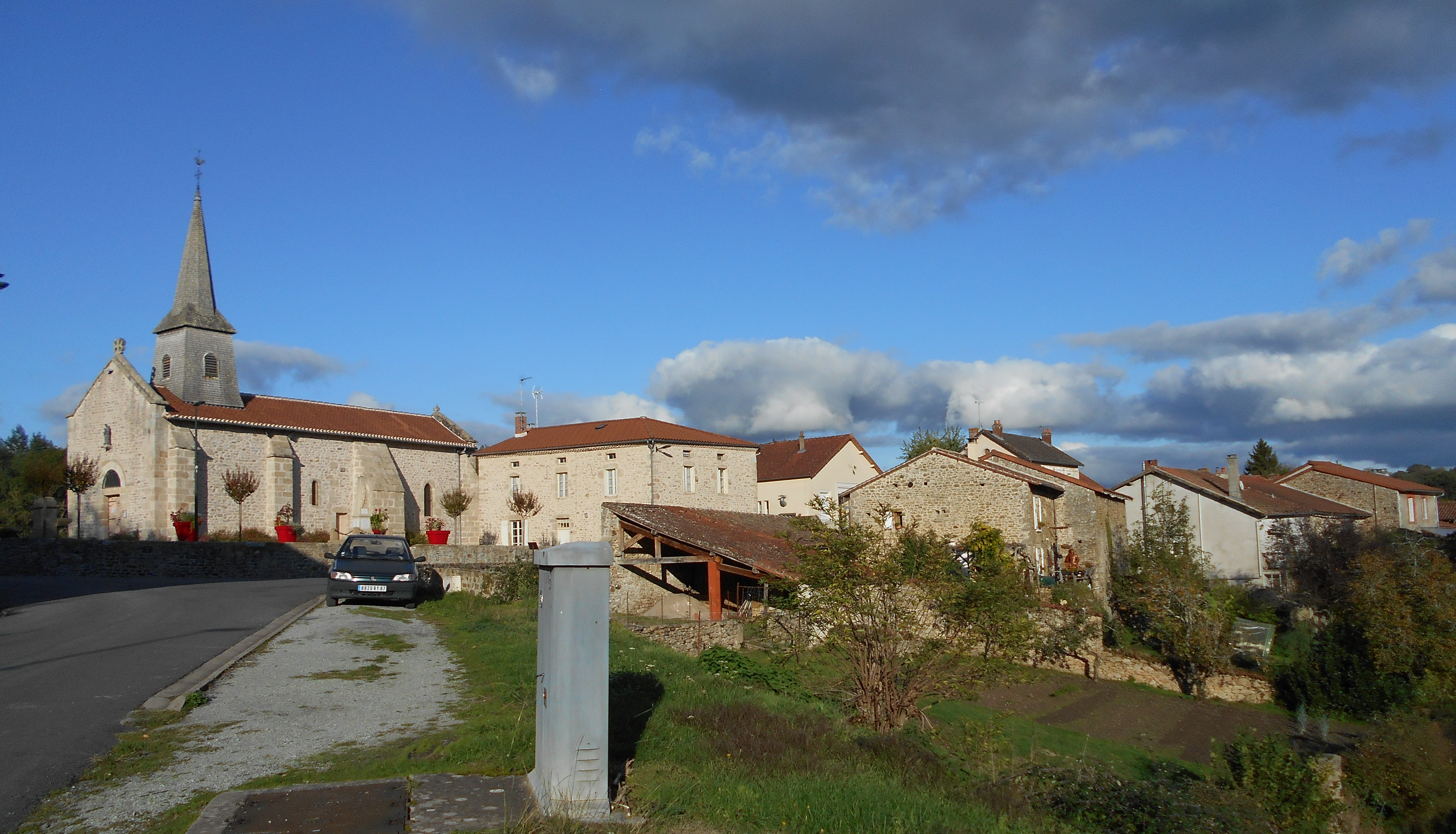

- Coat of arms
- Location of Balledent
- Location within France Location within Nouvelle-Aquitaine
- Coordinates: 46°06′41″N 1°12′36″E
- Country: France
- Region: Nouvelle-Aquitaine
- Department: Haute-Vienne
- Arrondissement: Bellac
- Canton: Châteauponsac
- Intercommunality: Gartempe – Saint Pardoux

Government
  - Mayor (2020–2026): Mady Petit
- Area^{1}: 12.28 km^{2} (4.74 sq mi)
- Highest elevation: 350 m (1,150 ft)
- Lowest elevation: 195 m (640 ft)
- Population (2023): 202
  - Density: 16.4/km^{2} (42.6/sq mi)
- Time zone: UTC+01:00 (CET)
  - Summer (DST): UTC+02:00 (CEST)
- INSEE/Postal code: 87007 /87290
- ^{1} French Land Register data, which excludes lakes, ponds, glaciers > 1 km^{2} (0.386 sq mi or 247 acres) and river estuaries.

Balledent (French pronunciation: [baldɑ̃]; Occitan: Baladent) is a commune in the Haute-Vienne department in the Nouvelle-Aquitaine region in western France.

== See also ==
- Communes of the Haute-Vienne department
