= Saint-Sornin-la-Marche =

- Commune
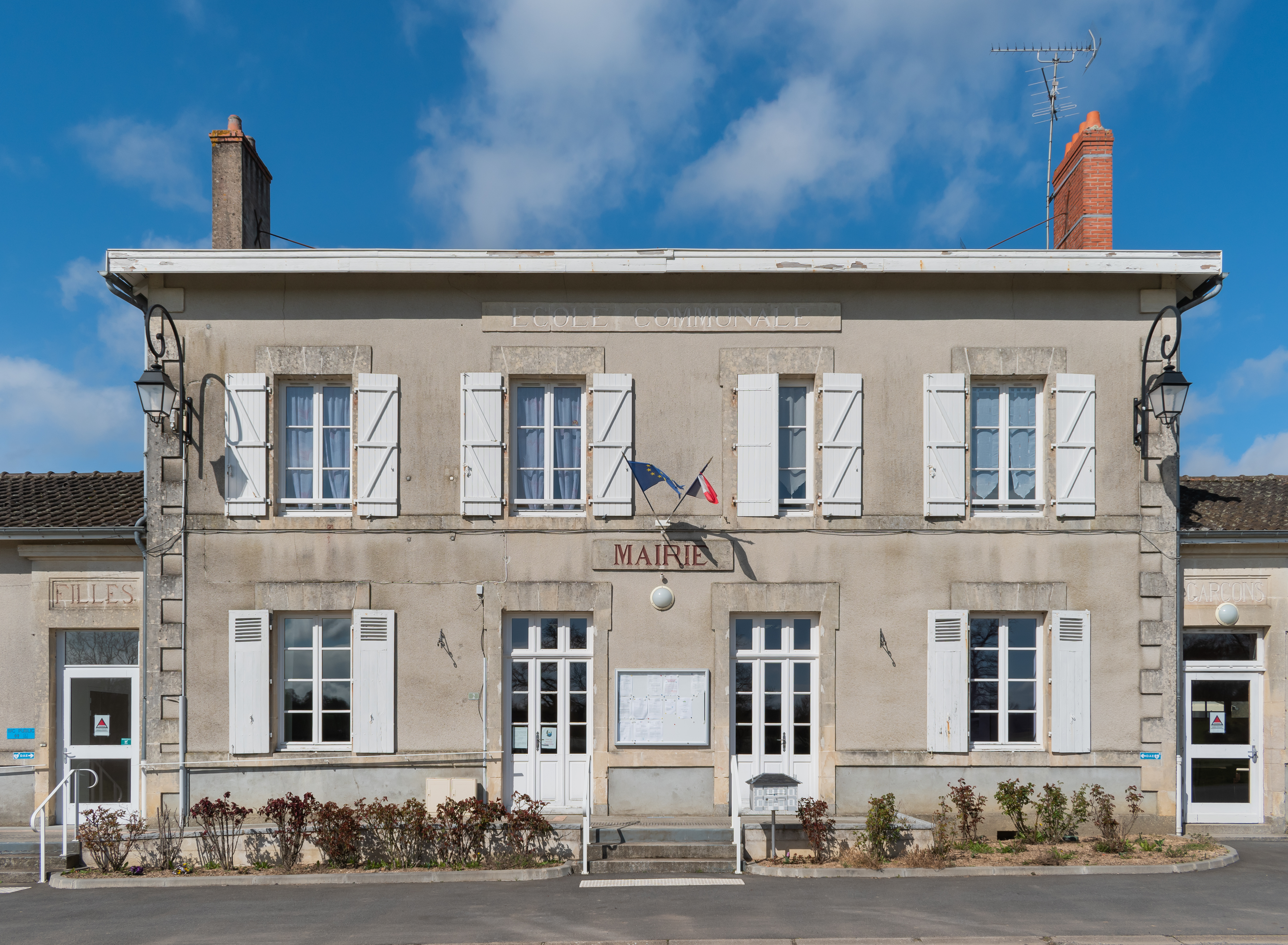
- Town hall of St-Sornin-la-Marche

- Coat of arms
- Location of Saint-Sornin-la-Marche
- Location within France Location within Nouvelle-Aquitaine
- Coordinates: 46°11′01″N 0°59′25″E
- Country: France
- Region: Nouvelle-Aquitaine
- Department: Haute-Vienne
- Arrondissement: Bellac
- Canton: Châteauponsac

Government
  - Mayor (2020–2026): Michel Piveteau
- Area^{1}: 24.39 km^{2} (9.42 sq mi)
- Highest elevation: 277 m (909 ft)
- Lowest elevation: 147 m (482 ft)
- Population (2023): 218
  - Density: 8.94/km^{2} (23.1/sq mi)
- Time zone: UTC+01:00 (CET)
  - Summer (DST): UTC+02:00 (CEST)
- INSEE/Postal code: 87179 /87210
- ^{1} French Land Register data, which excludes lakes, ponds, glaciers > 1 km^{2} (0.386 sq mi or 247 acres) and river estuaries.

Saint-Sornin-la-Marche (French pronunciation: [sɛ̃ sɔʁnɛ̃ la maʁʃ]; Occitan: Sent Sòrnin la Marcha) is a commune in the Haute-Vienne department in the Nouvelle-Aquitaine region in west-central France.

== See also ==
- Communes of the Haute-Vienne department
