= Gajoubert =

- Commune
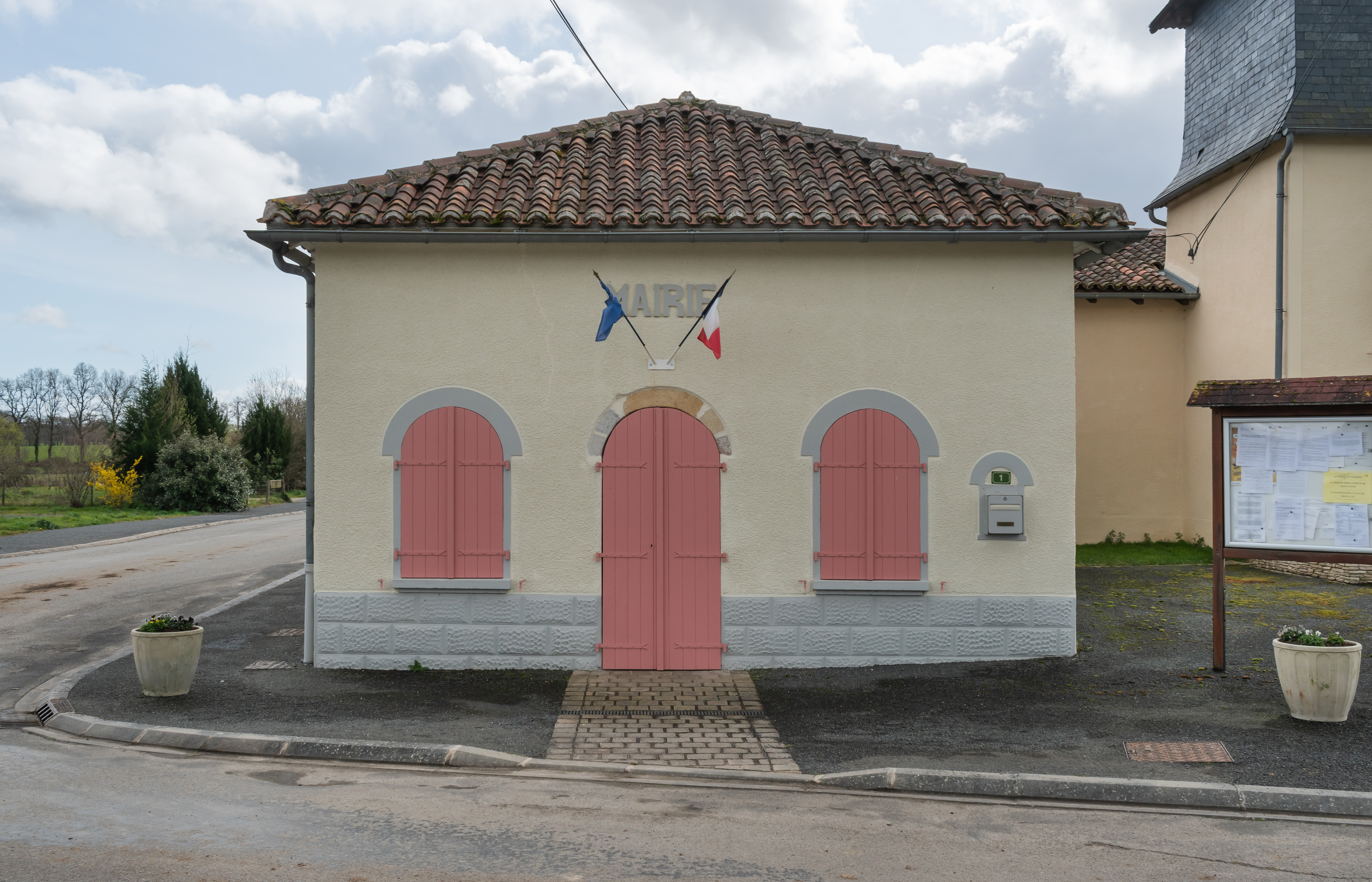
- Town hall of Gajoubert
- Location of Gajoubert
- Location within France Location within Nouvelle-Aquitaine
- Coordinates: 46°06′51″N 0°49′53″E
- Country: France
- Region: Nouvelle-Aquitaine
- Department: Haute-Vienne
- Arrondissement: Bellac
- Canton: Bellac
- Intercommunality: Haut-Limousin en Marche

Government
  - Mayor (2020–2026): Jacques De La Salle
- Area^{1}: 14.11 km^{2} (5.45 sq mi)
- Highest elevation: 247 m (810 ft)
- Lowest elevation: 180 m (590 ft)
- Population (2023): 148
  - Density: 10.5/km^{2} (27.2/sq mi)
- Time zone: UTC+01:00 (CET)
  - Summer (DST): UTC+02:00 (CEST)
- INSEE/Postal code: 87069 /87330
- ^{1} French Land Register data, which excludes lakes, ponds, glaciers > 1 km^{2} (0.386 sq mi or 247 acres) and river estuaries.

Gajoubert (French pronunciation: [ɡaʒubɛʁ]; Occitan: Ga Jaubèrt) is a commune in the Haute-Vienne department in the Nouvelle-Aquitaine region in west-central France.

== See also ==
- Communes of the Haute-Vienne department
