= Peyrat-de-Bellac =

- Commune
- Location of Peyrat-de-Bellac
- Location within France Location within Nouvelle-Aquitaine
- Coordinates: 46°08′35″N 1°02′16″E
- Country: France
- Region: Nouvelle-Aquitaine
- Department: Haute-Vienne
- Arrondissement: Bellac
- Canton: Bellac
- Intercommunality: Haut-Limousin en Marche

Government
  - Mayor (2020–2026): Patricia Marcoux-Lestieux
- Area^{1}: 31.20 km^{2} (12.05 sq mi)
- Highest elevation: 272 m (892 ft)
- Lowest elevation: 162 m (531 ft)
- Population (2023): 1,059
  - Density: 33.94/km^{2} (87.91/sq mi)
- Time zone: UTC+01:00 (CET)
  - Summer (DST): UTC+02:00 (CEST)
- INSEE/Postal code: 87116 /87300
- ^{1} French Land Register data, which excludes lakes, ponds, glaciers > 1 km^{2} (0.386 sq mi or 247 acres) and river estuaries.

Peyrat-de-Bellac (French pronunciation: [pɛʁa də bɛlak], literally Peyrat of Bellac; Occitan: Pairac de Belac) is a commune in the Haute-Vienne department in the Nouvelle-Aquitaine region in west-central France.

Inhabitants are known as Peyrachons.

== See also ==
- Communes of the Haute-Vienne department
