= Saint-Martin-le-Mault =

- Commune
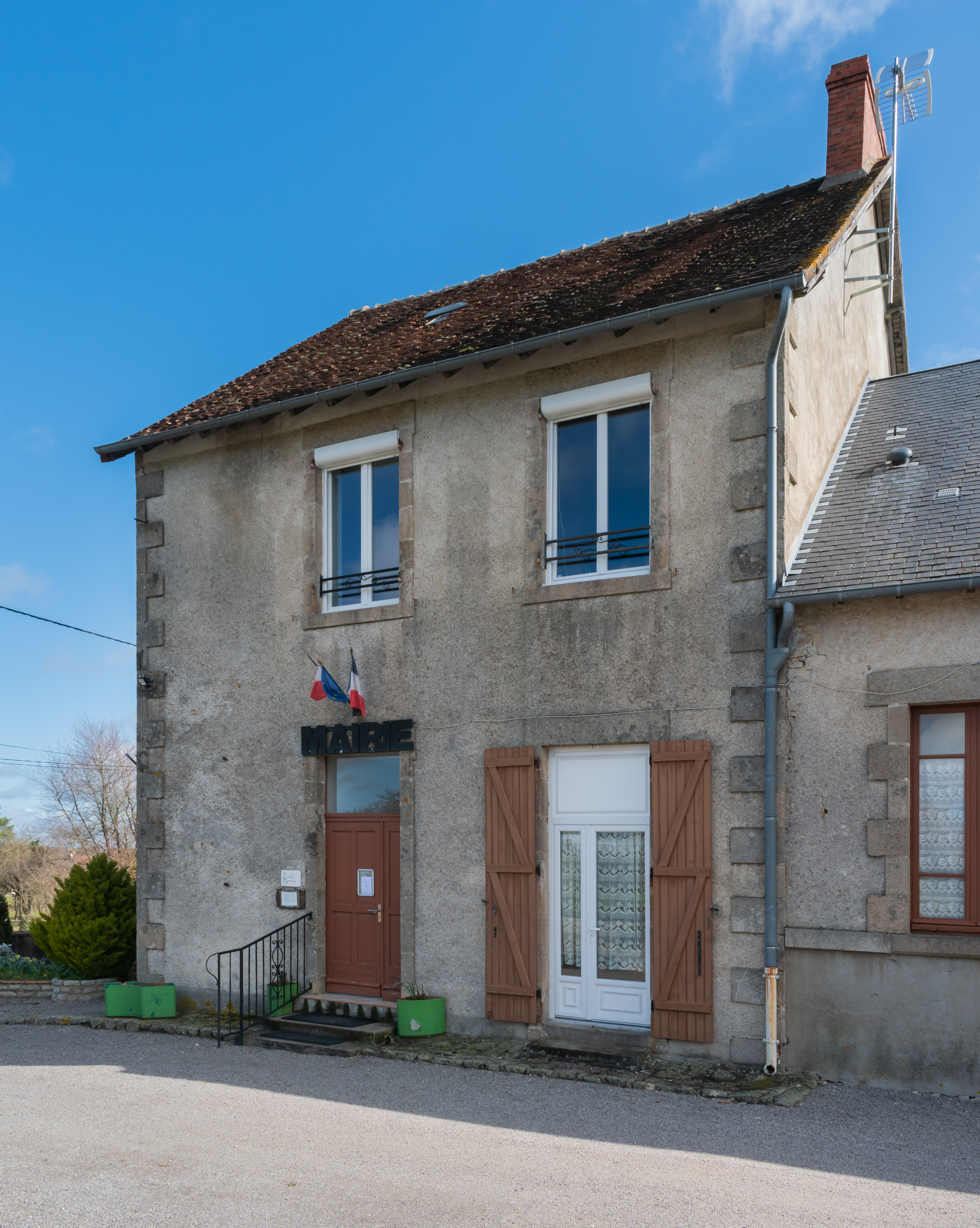
- Town hall of St-Martin-le-Mault
- Location of Saint-Martin-le-Mault
- Location within France Location within Nouvelle-Aquitaine
- Coordinates: 46°21′52″N 1°13′11″E
- Country: France
- Region: Nouvelle-Aquitaine
- Department: Haute-Vienne
- Arrondissement: Bellac
- Canton: Châteauponsac

Government
  - Mayor (2020–2026): Michel Navarre
- Area^{1}: 12.50 km^{2} (4.83 sq mi)
- Highest elevation: 238 m (781 ft)
- Lowest elevation: 155 m (509 ft)
- Population (2023): 146
  - Density: 11.7/km^{2} (30.3/sq mi)
- Time zone: UTC+01:00 (CET)
  - Summer (DST): UTC+02:00 (CEST)
- INSEE/Postal code: 87165 /87360
- ^{1} French Land Register data, which excludes lakes, ponds, glaciers > 1 km^{2} (0.386 sq mi or 247 acres) and river estuaries.

Saint-Martin-le-Mault (Occitan: Sent Martin) is a commune in the Haute-Vienne department in the Nouvelle-Aquitaine region in west-central France.

== Geography ==
The river Benaize forms most of the commune's north-eastern border, flows through the commune, then forms part of the commune's north-western border.

== See also ==
- Communes of the Haute-Vienne department
