= Mailhac-sur-Benaize =

- Commune
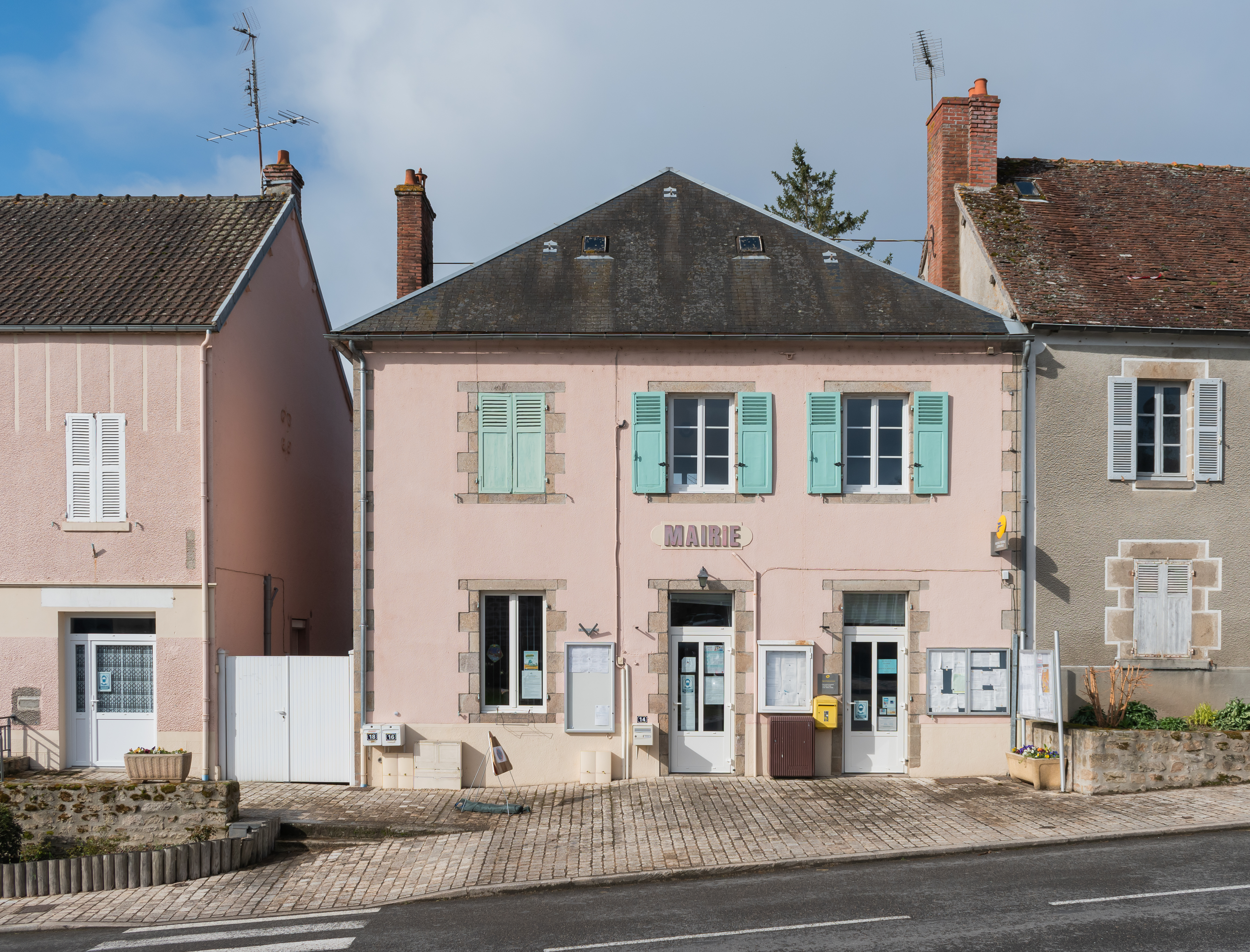
- Town hall of Mailhac-sur-Benaize

- Coat of arms
- Location of Mailhac-sur-Benaize
- Location within France Location within Nouvelle-Aquitaine
- Coordinates: 46°19′24″N 1°19′50″E
- Country: France
- Region: Nouvelle-Aquitaine
- Department: Haute-Vienne
- Arrondissement: Bellac
- Canton: Châteauponsac

Government
  - Mayor (2020–2026): Ginette Imbert
- Area^{1}: 21.20 km^{2} (8.19 sq mi)
- Highest elevation: 292 m (958 ft)
- Lowest elevation: 224 m (735 ft)
- Population (2023): 278
  - Density: 13.1/km^{2} (34.0/sq mi)
- Time zone: UTC+01:00 (CET)
  - Summer (DST): UTC+02:00 (CEST)
- INSEE/Postal code: 87090 /87160
- ^{1} French Land Register data, which excludes lakes, ponds, glaciers > 1 km^{2} (0.386 sq mi or 247 acres) and river estuaries.

Mailhac-sur-Benaize (French pronunciation: [majak syʁ bənɛz], literally Mailhac on Benaize; Occitan: Malhac) is a commune in the Haute-Vienne department in the Nouvelle-Aquitaine region in west-central France.

== Geography ==
The river Benaize forms part of the commune's eastern border, flows through the commune, crossing the village of Mailhac-sur-Benaize, then forms part of the commune's north-western border.

== See also ==
- Communes of the Haute-Vienne department
