= Cieux =

- Commune
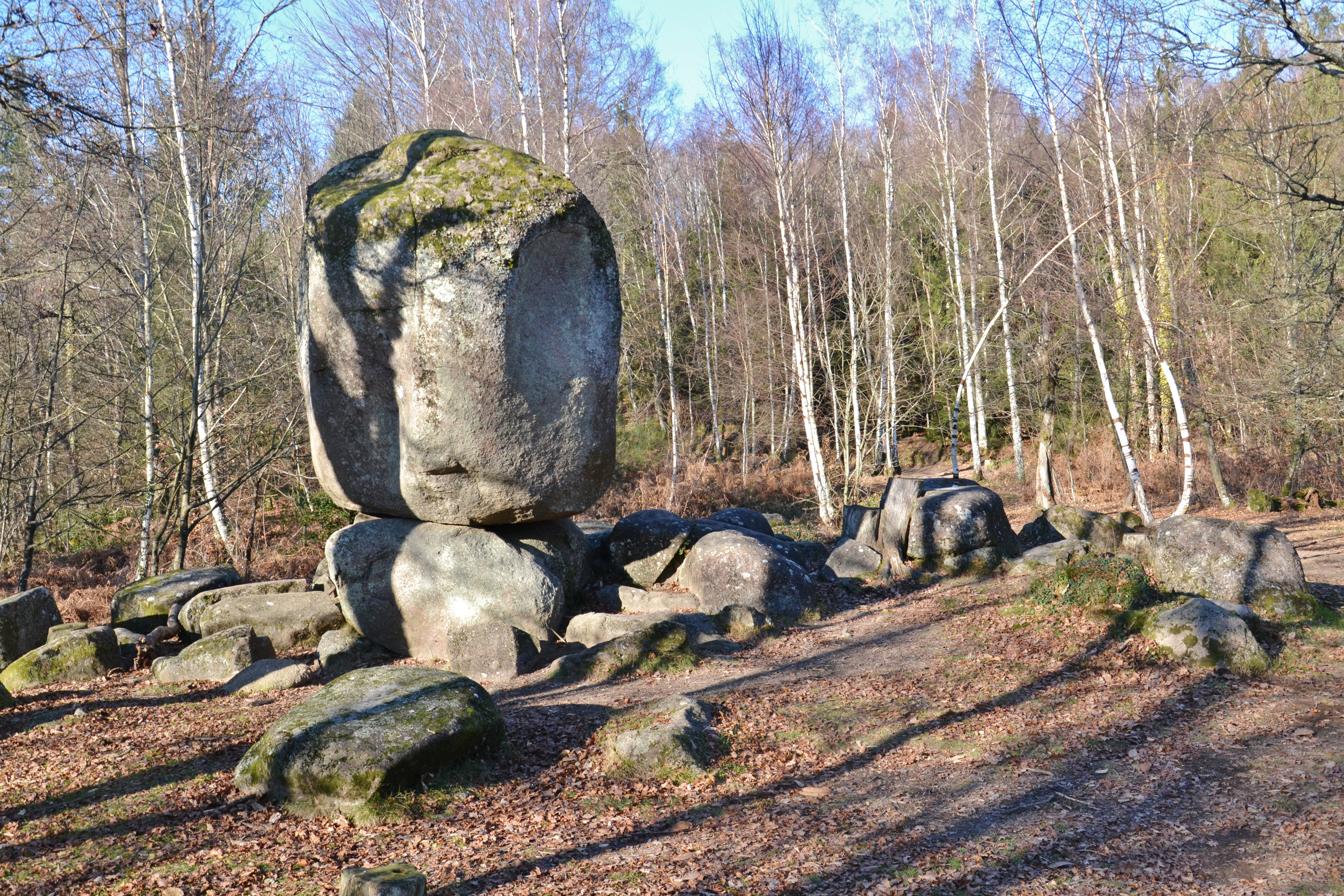
- The Boscartus stone, in Cieux

- Coat of arms
- Location of Cieux
- Location within France Location within Nouvelle-Aquitaine
- Coordinates: 45°59′33″N 1°02′46″E
- Country: France
- Region: Nouvelle-Aquitaine
- Department: Haute-Vienne
- Arrondissement: Bellac
- Canton: Bellac
- Intercommunality: Haut-Limousin en Marche

Government
  - Mayor (2020–2026): Jean-Marie Esclamadon
- Area^{1}: 41.06 km^{2} (15.85 sq mi)
- Highest elevation: 410 m (1,350 ft)
- Lowest elevation: 258 m (846 ft)
- Population (2023): 1,003
  - Density: 24.43/km^{2} (63.27/sq mi)
- Time zone: UTC+01:00 (CET)
  - Summer (DST): UTC+02:00 (CEST)
- INSEE/Postal code: 87045 /87520
- ^{1} French Land Register data, which excludes lakes, ponds, glaciers > 1 km^{2} (0.386 sq mi or 247 acres) and river estuaries.

Cieux (French pronunciation: [sjø]; Occitan: Síus) is a commune in the Haute-Vienne department of the Nouvelle-Aquitaine region in western France.

Inhabitants are known as Ciellois.

== See also ==
- Communes of the Haute-Vienne department
