= Le Buis =

- Commune
- Coat of arms
- Location of Le Buis
- Location within France Location within Nouvelle-Aquitaine
- Coordinates: 46°02′10″N 1°12′12″E
- Country: France
- Region: Nouvelle-Aquitaine
- Department: Haute-Vienne
- Arrondissement: Bellac
- Canton: Bellac

Government
  - Mayor (2020–2026): Jean-Claude Thomas
- Area^{1}: 6.55 km^{2} (2.53 sq mi)
- Highest elevation: 431 m (1,414 ft)
- Lowest elevation: 270 m (890 ft)
- Population (2023): 178
  - Density: 27.2/km^{2} (70.4/sq mi)
- Time zone: UTC+01:00 (CET)
  - Summer (DST): UTC+02:00 (CEST)
- INSEE/Postal code: 87023 /87140
- ^{1} French Land Register data, which excludes lakes, ponds, glaciers > 1 km^{2} (0.386 sq mi or 247 acres) and river estuaries.

Le Buis (French pronunciation: [lə bɥi]; Occitan: Lu Bois) is a commune in the Haute-Vienne department in the Nouvelle-Aquitaine region in western France.

Inhabitants are known as Buinauds.

== See also ==
- Communes of the Haute-Vienne department
