= Blanzac, Haute-Vienne =

Blanzac
- Commune
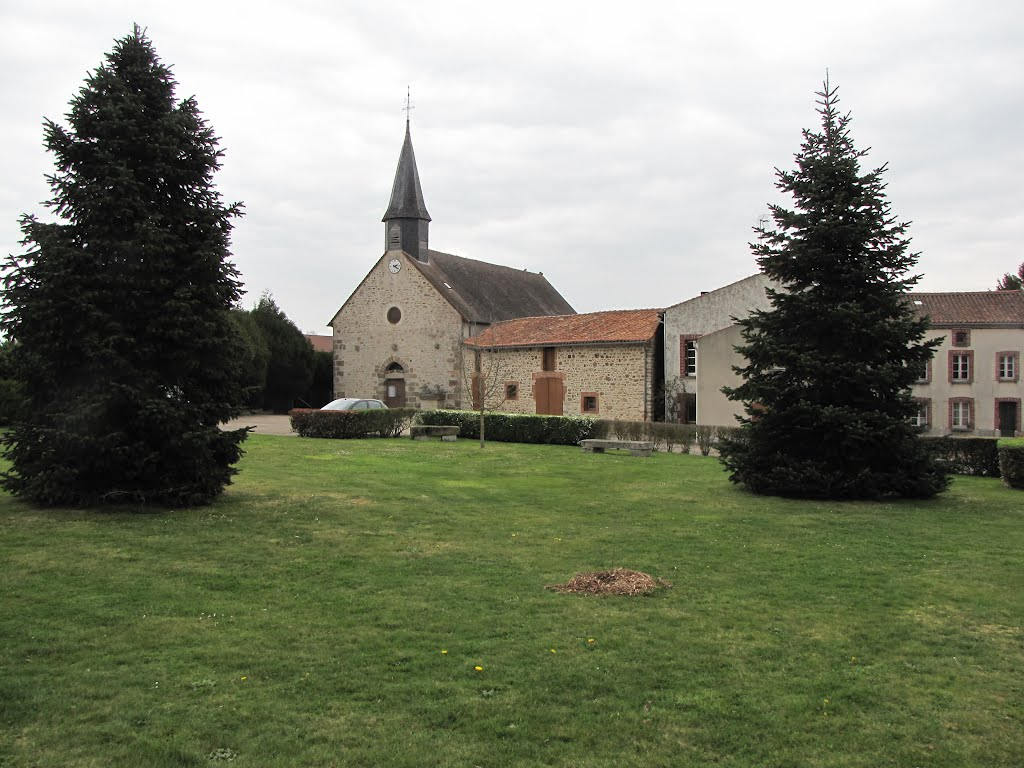
- Blanzac Church

- Coat of arms
- Location of Blanzac
- Location within France Location within Nouvelle-Aquitaine
- Coordinates: 46°08′04″N 1°06′51″E
- Country: France
- Region: Nouvelle-Aquitaine
- Department: Haute-Vienne
- Arrondissement: Bellac
- Canton: Bellac

Government
  - Mayor (2020–2026): Pierre Roumilhac
- Area^{1}: 23.50 km^{2} (9.07 sq mi)
- Highest elevation: 283 m (928 ft)
- Lowest elevation: 179 m (587 ft)
- Population (2023): 468
  - Density: 19.9/km^{2} (51.6/sq mi)
- Time zone: UTC+01:00 (CET)
  - Summer (DST): UTC+02:00 (CEST)
- INSEE/Postal code: 87017 /87300
- ^{1} French Land Register data, which excludes lakes, ponds, glaciers > 1 km^{2} (0.386 sq mi or 247 acres) and river estuaries.

Blanzac (French pronunciation: [blɑ̃zak]) is a commune in the Haute-Vienne department in the Nouvelle-Aquitaine region in central-western France.

== See also ==
- Communes of the Haute-Vienne department
