= Canton of Bellac =

Coordinates: 46.12°N 1.05°E

The canton of Bellac is an administrative division of the Haute-Vienne department, western France. Its borders were modified at the French canton reorganisation which came into effect in March 2015. Its seat is in Bellac.

It consists of the following communes:

1. Bellac
2. Berneuil
3. Blanzac
4. Blond
5. Breuilaufa
6. Le Buis
7. Chamboret
8. Cieux
9. Compreignac
10. Gajoubert
11. Montrol-Sénard
12. Mortemart
13. Nantiat
14. Nouic
15. Peyrat-de-Bellac
16. Saint-Bonnet-de-Bellac
17. Saint-Junien-les-Combes
18. Saint-Martial-sur-Isop
19. Saint-Pardoux-le-Lac
20. Thouron
21. Val-d'Issoire
22. Vaulry
