= Thouron =

- Commune
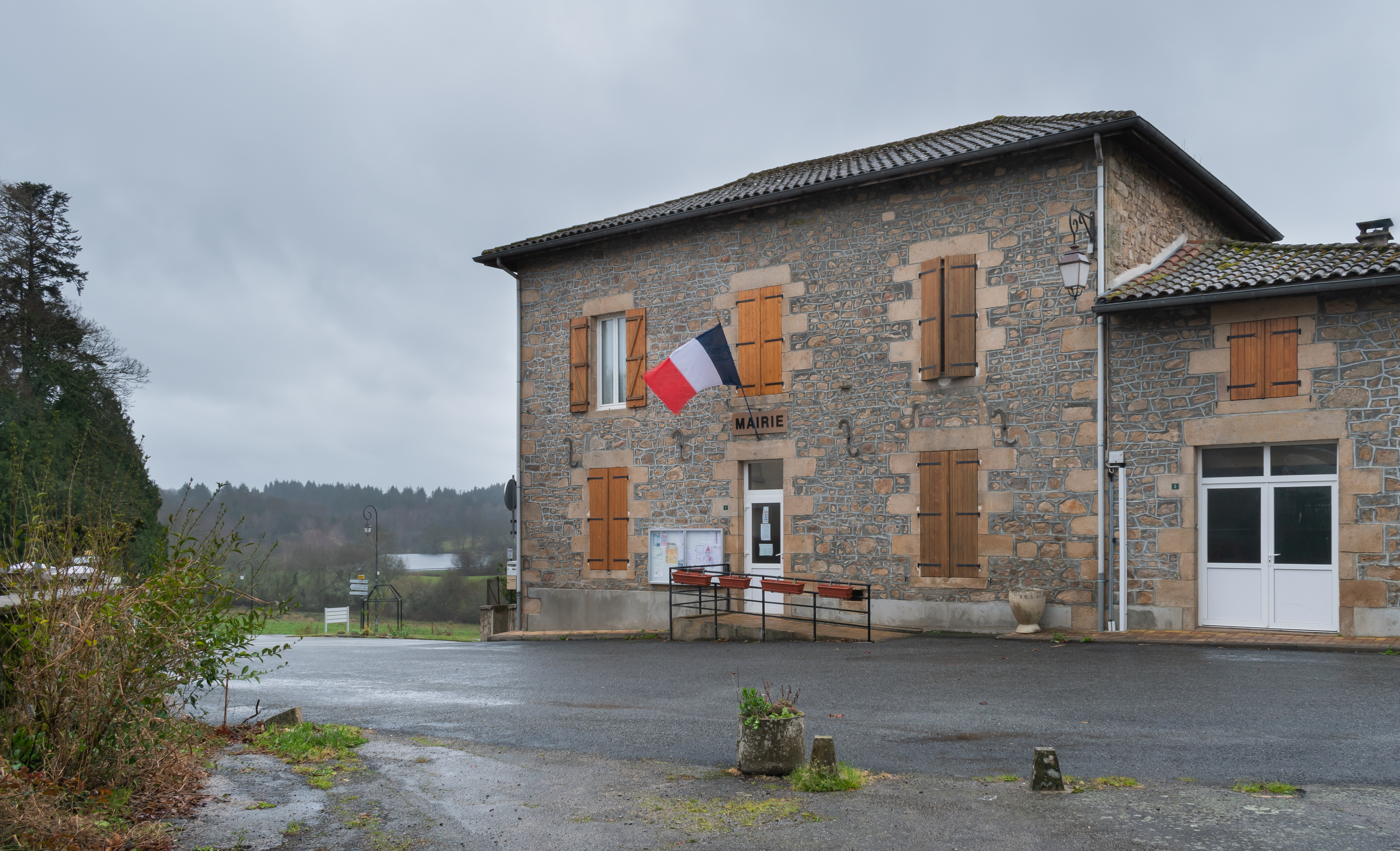
- Town hall of Thouron

- Coat of arms
- Location of Thouron
- Location within France Location within Nouvelle-Aquitaine
- Coordinates: 45°59′59″N 1°13′12″E
- Country: France
- Region: Nouvelle-Aquitaine
- Department: Haute-Vienne
- Arrondissement: Bellac
- Canton: Bellac

Government
  - Mayor (2020–2026): Max Bascans
- Area^{1}: 13.73 km^{2} (5.30 sq mi)
- Highest elevation: 430 m (1,410 ft)
- Lowest elevation: 287 m (942 ft)
- Population (2023): 563
  - Density: 41.0/km^{2} (106/sq mi)
- Time zone: UTC+01:00 (CET)
  - Summer (DST): UTC+02:00 (CEST)
- INSEE/Postal code: 87197 /87140
- ^{1} French Land Register data, which excludes lakes, ponds, glaciers > 1 km^{2} (0.386 sq mi or 247 acres) and river estuaries.

Thouron (French pronunciation: [tuʁɔ̃]; Occitan: Toron) is a commune in the Haute-Vienne department in the Nouvelle-Aquitaine region in west-central France.

== See also ==
- Communes of the Haute-Vienne department
