= Nantiat =

- Commune
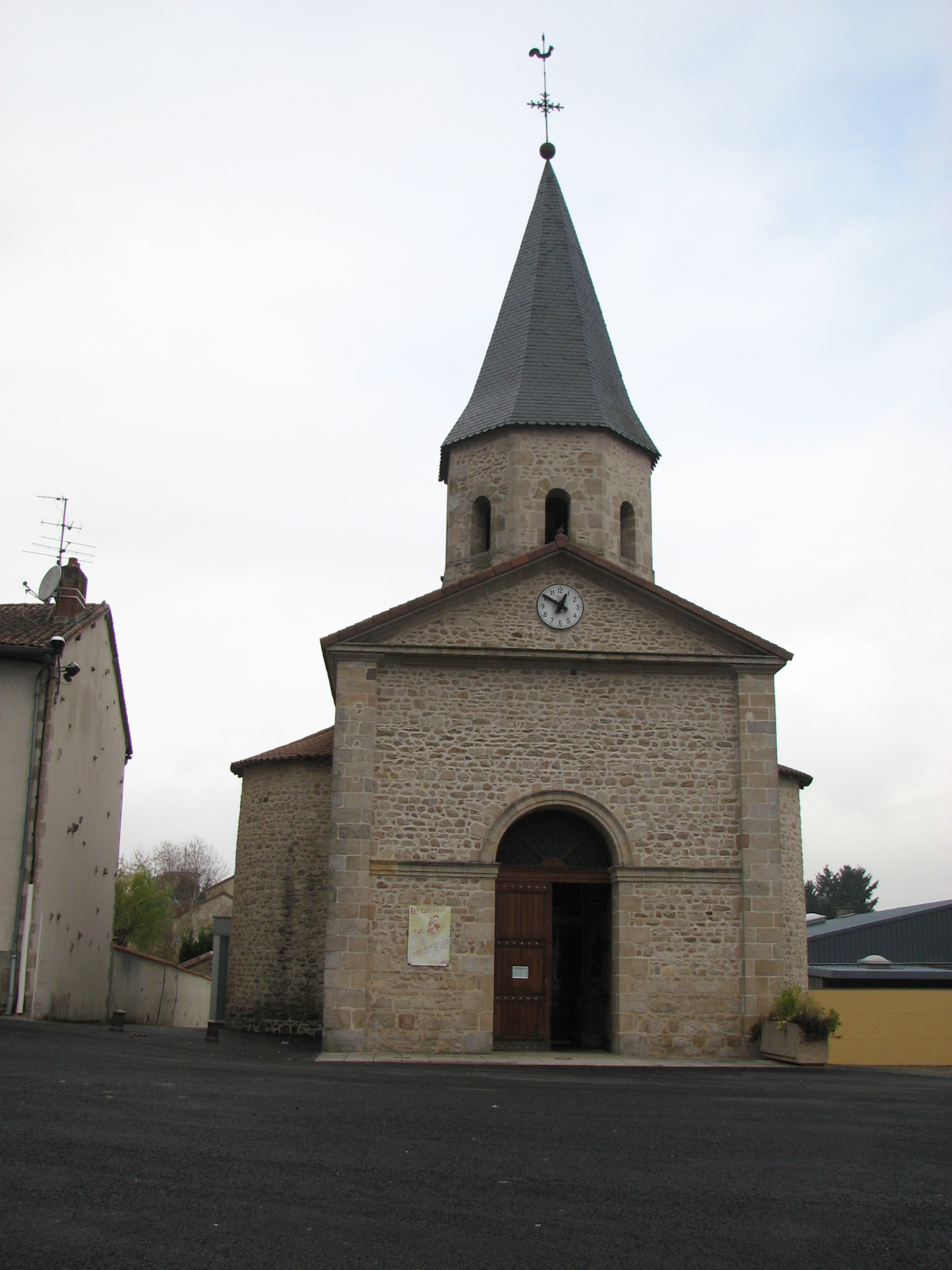
- The church in Nantiat

- Coat of arms
- Location of Nantiat
- Location within France Location within Nouvelle-Aquitaine
- Coordinates: 46°00′36″N 1°10′27″E
- Country: France
- Region: Nouvelle-Aquitaine
- Department: Haute-Vienne
- Arrondissement: Bellac
- Canton: Bellac

Government
  - Mayor (2020–2026): Daniel Perrot
- Area^{1}: 25.42 km^{2} (9.81 sq mi)
- Highest elevation: 422 m (1,385 ft)
- Lowest elevation: 258 m (846 ft)
- Population (2023): 1,580
  - Density: 62.2/km^{2} (161/sq mi)
- Time zone: UTC+01:00 (CET)
  - Summer (DST): UTC+02:00 (CEST)
- INSEE/Postal code: 87103 /87140
- ^{1} French Land Register data, which excludes lakes, ponds, glaciers > 1 km^{2} (0.386 sq mi or 247 acres) and river estuaries.

Nantiat (Occitan: Nantiac, French pronunciation: [nɑ̃tja]; Occitan: Nantiac) is a commune in the Haute-Vienne department in the Nouvelle-Aquitaine region in west-central France.

Inhabitants are known as Nantiauds.

== See also ==
- Communes of the Haute-Vienne department
