= Montrol-Sénard =

- Commune
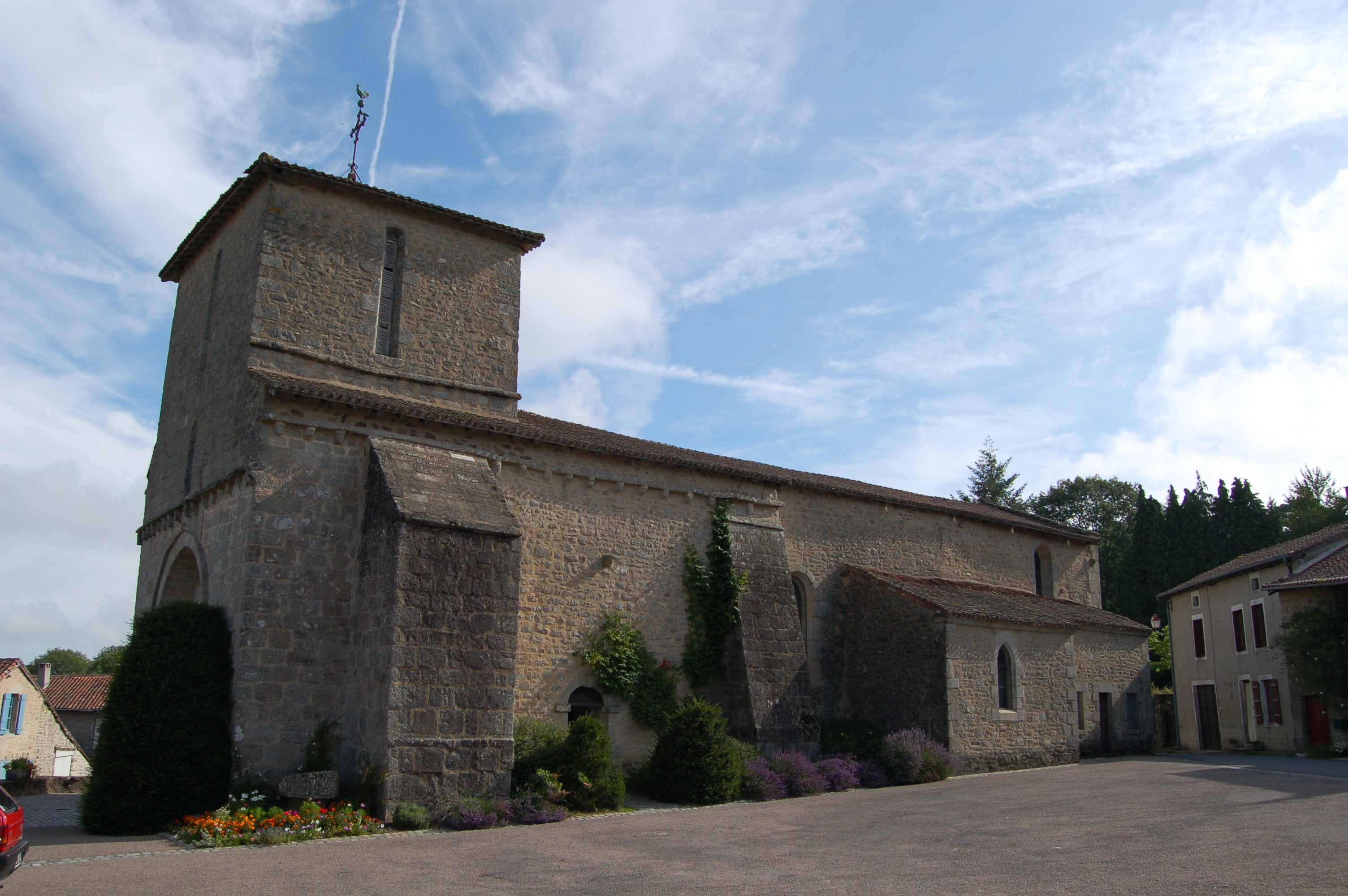
- The church in Montrol-Sénard
- Location of Montrol-Sénard
- Location within France Location within Nouvelle-Aquitaine
- Coordinates: 46°01′54″N 0°57′34″E
- Country: France
- Region: Nouvelle-Aquitaine
- Department: Haute-Vienne
- Arrondissement: Bellac
- Canton: Bellac
- Intercommunality: Haut-Limousin en Marche

Government
  - Mayor (2020–2026): Yvette Coindeau
- Area^{1}: 27.17 km^{2} (10.49 sq mi)
- Highest elevation: 492 m (1,614 ft)
- Lowest elevation: 268 m (879 ft)
- Population (2023): 249
  - Density: 9.16/km^{2} (23.7/sq mi)
- Time zone: UTC+01:00 (CET)
  - Summer (DST): UTC+02:00 (CEST)
- INSEE/Postal code: 87100 /87330
- ^{1} French Land Register data, which excludes lakes, ponds, glaciers > 1 km^{2} (0.386 sq mi or 247 acres) and river estuaries.

Montrol-Sénard (French pronunciation: [mɔ̃tʁɔl senaʁ]; Occitan: Monsteiròu) is a commune in the Haute-Vienne department in the Nouvelle-Aquitaine region in west-central France.

== See also ==
- Communes of the Haute-Vienne department
