= Breuilaufa =

- Commune
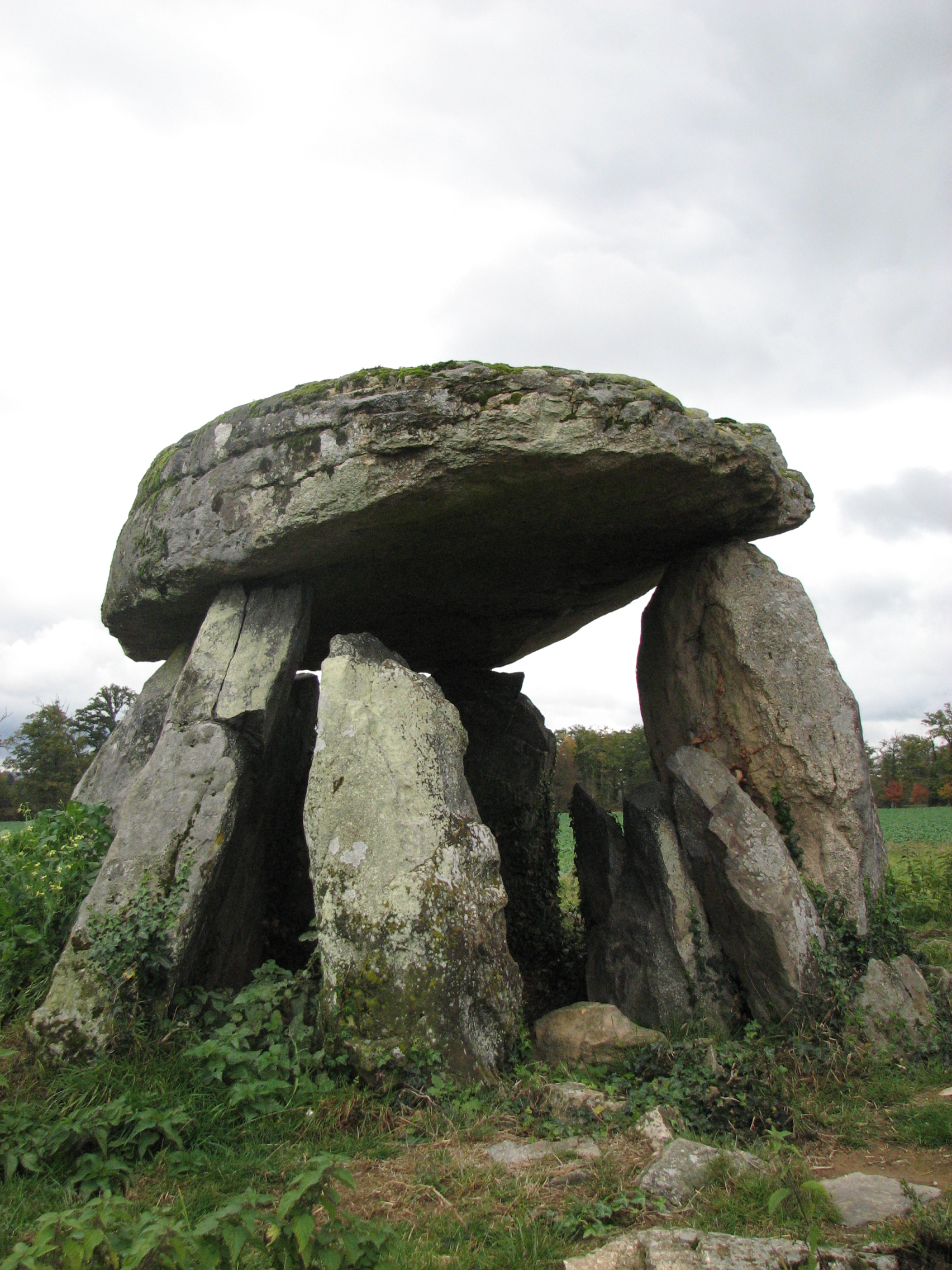
- Dolmens de la Betoulle, in Breuilaufa

- Coat of arms
- Location of Breuilaufa
- Location within France Location within Nouvelle-Aquitaine
- Coordinates: 46°02′36″N 1°06′20″E
- Country: France
- Region: Nouvelle-Aquitaine
- Department: Haute-Vienne
- Arrondissement: Bellac
- Canton: Bellac

Government
  - Mayor (2020–2026): Franck Maitre
- Area^{1}: 4.60 km^{2} (1.78 sq mi)
- Highest elevation: 315 m (1,033 ft)
- Lowest elevation: 236 m (774 ft)
- Population (2023): 119
  - Density: 25.9/km^{2} (67.0/sq mi)
- Time zone: UTC+01:00 (CET)
  - Summer (DST): UTC+02:00 (CEST)
- INSEE/Postal code: 87022 /87300
- ^{1} French Land Register data, which excludes lakes, ponds, glaciers > 1 km^{2} (0.386 sq mi or 247 acres) and river estuaries.

Breuilaufa (French pronunciation: [bʁœjofa]; Occitan: Lo Bruèlh au Fag) is a commune in the Haute-Vienne department in the Nouvelle-Aquitaine region in western France.

Inhabitants are known as Breuilaufais in French.

== See also ==
- Communes of the Haute-Vienne department
