= Nouic =

- Commune
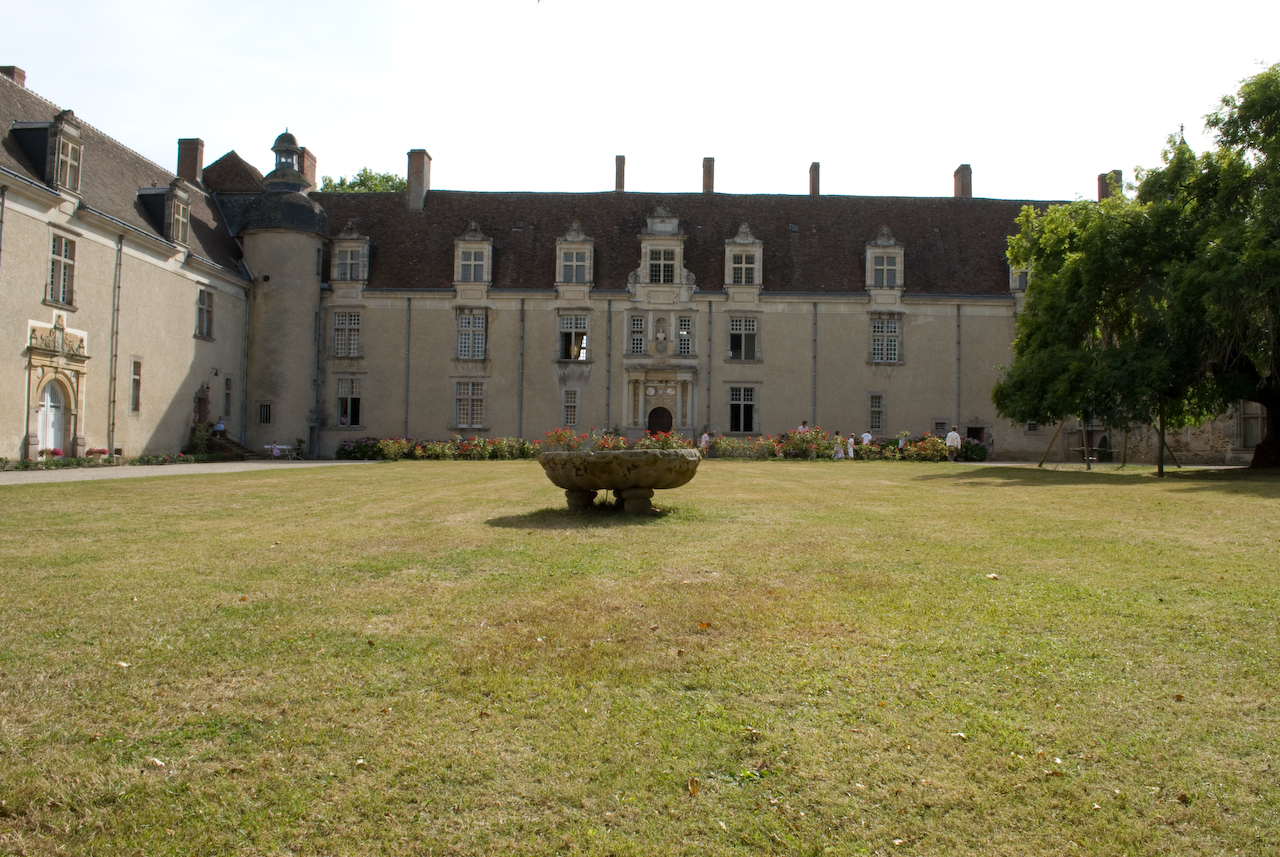
- The Château du Fraisse, in Nouic
- Location of Nouic
- Location within France Location within Nouvelle-Aquitaine
- Coordinates: 46°03′39″N 0°55′14″E
- Country: France
- Region: Nouvelle-Aquitaine
- Department: Haute-Vienne
- Arrondissement: Bellac
- Canton: Bellac
- Intercommunality: Haut-Limousin en Marche

Government
  - Mayor (2020–2026): Serge Nougier
- Area^{1}: 35.95 km^{2} (13.88 sq mi)
- Highest elevation: 360 m (1,180 ft)
- Lowest elevation: 185 m (607 ft)
- Population (2023): 423
  - Density: 11.8/km^{2} (30.5/sq mi)
- Time zone: UTC+01:00 (CET)
  - Summer (DST): UTC+02:00 (CEST)
- INSEE/Postal code: 87108 /87330
- ^{1} French Land Register data, which excludes lakes, ponds, glaciers > 1 km^{2} (0.386 sq mi or 247 acres) and river estuaries.

Nouic (French pronunciation: [nwik]; Occitan: Noic) is a commune in the Haute-Vienne department in the Nouvelle-Aquitaine region in west-central France.

Inhabitants are known as Nouaijauds.

== See also ==
- Communes of the Haute-Vienne department
