= Chamboret =

- Commune
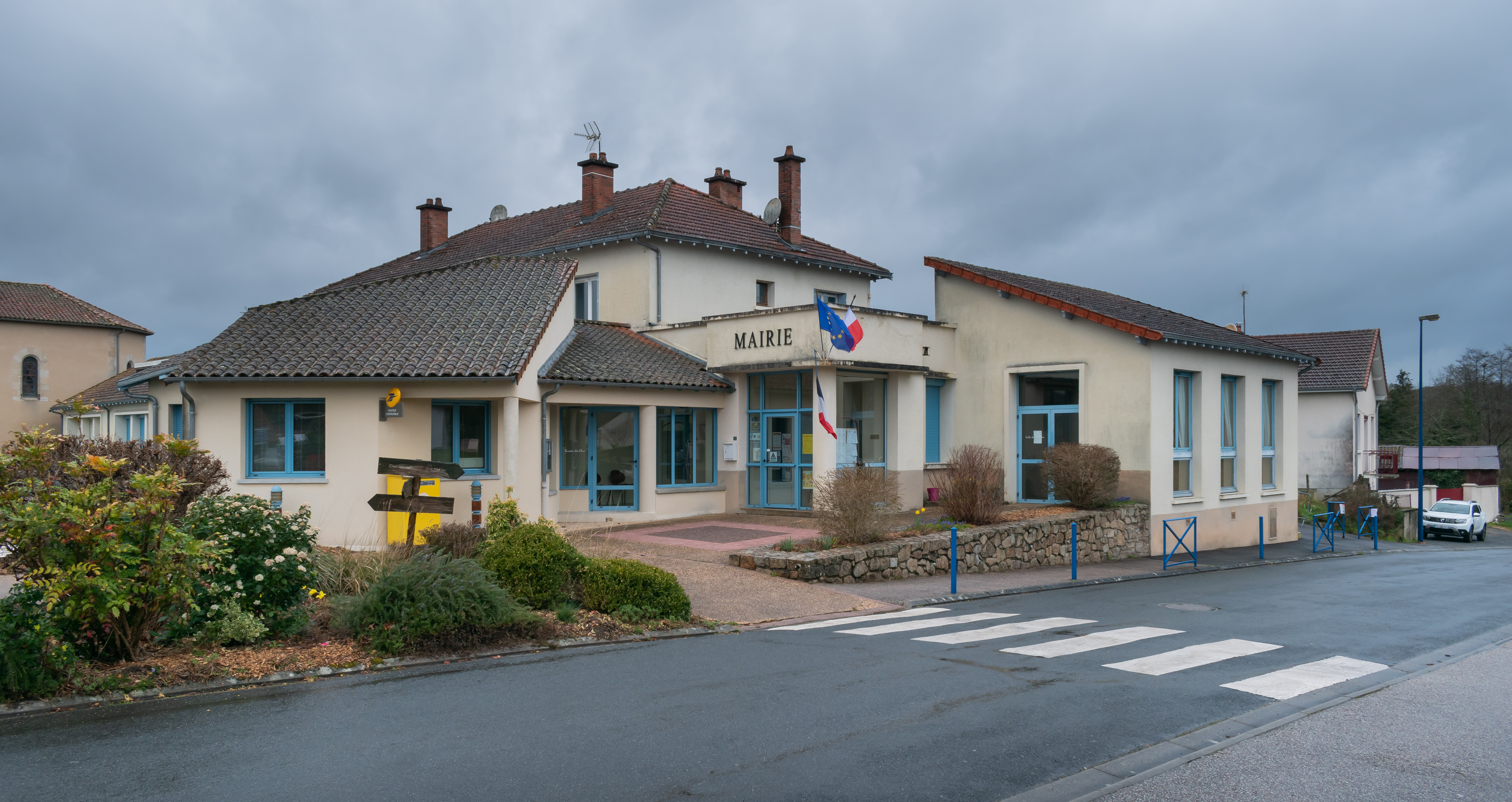
- Town hall of Chamboret

- Coat of arms
- Location of Chamboret
- Location within France Location within Nouvelle-Aquitaine
- Coordinates: 46°00′22″N 1°08′11″E
- Country: France
- Region: Nouvelle-Aquitaine
- Department: Haute-Vienne
- Arrondissement: Bellac
- Canton: Bellac

Government
  - Mayor (2020–2026): Jean-Jacques Duprat
- Area^{1}: 21.59 km^{2} (8.34 sq mi)
- Highest elevation: 373 m (1,224 ft)
- Lowest elevation: 246 m (807 ft)
- Population (2023): 782
  - Density: 36.2/km^{2} (93.8/sq mi)
- Time zone: UTC+01:00 (CET)
  - Summer (DST): UTC+02:00 (CEST)
- INSEE/Postal code: 87033 /87140
- ^{1} French Land Register data, which excludes lakes, ponds, glaciers > 1 km^{2} (0.386 sq mi or 247 acres) and river estuaries.

Chamboret (French pronunciation: [ʃɑ̃bɔʁɛ]; Occitan: Chamborèt) is a commune in the Haute-Vienne department in the Nouvelle-Aquitaine region in western France.

== See also ==
- Communes of the Haute-Vienne department
