= Bellac =

- Subprefecture and commune
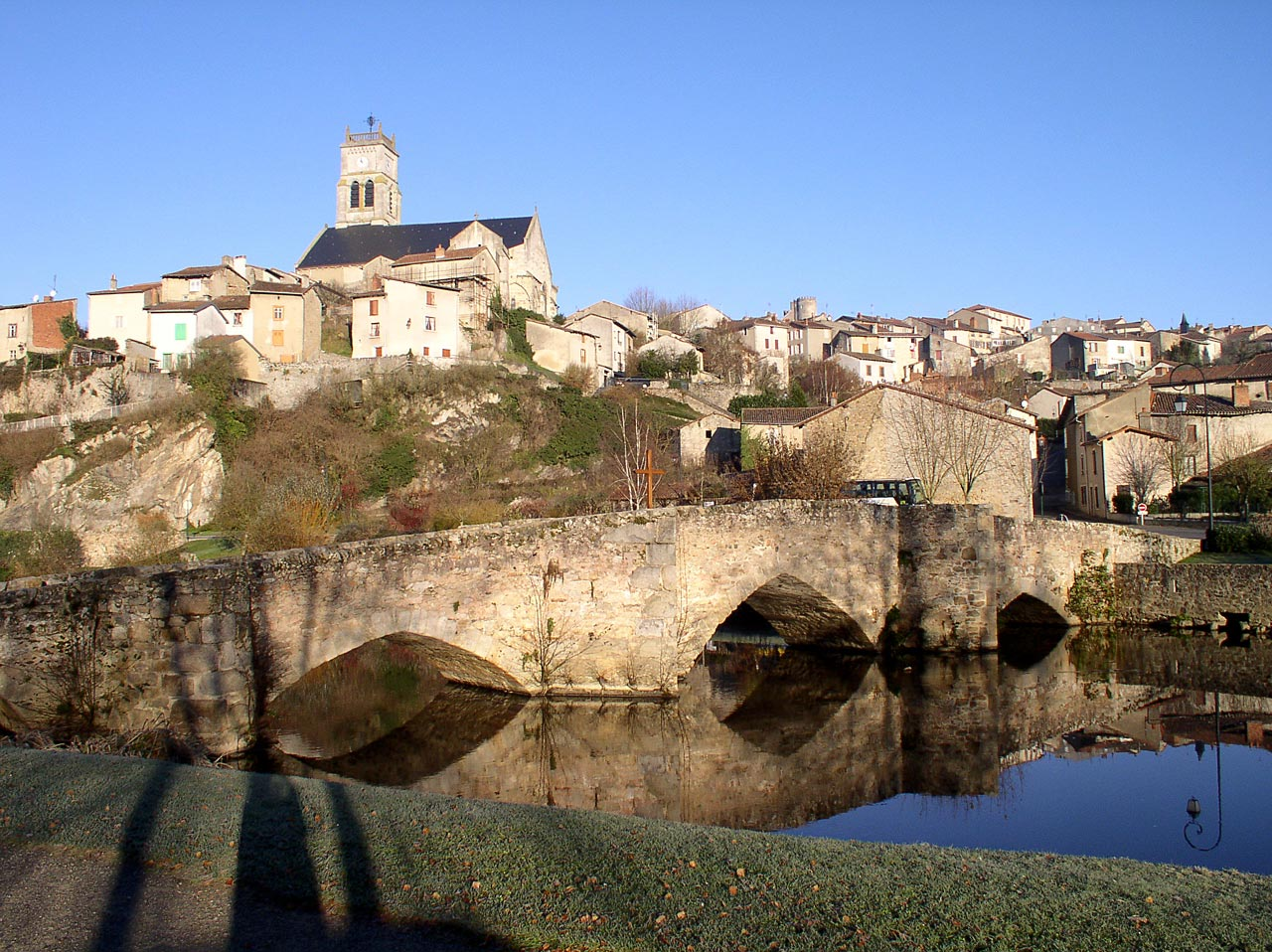
- Bridge over the Vincou

- Coat of arms
- Location of Bellac
- Location within France Location within Nouvelle-Aquitaine
- Coordinates: 46°07′23″N 1°03′01″E
- Country: France
- Region: Nouvelle-Aquitaine
- Department: Haute-Vienne
- Arrondissement: Bellac
- Canton: Bellac
- Intercommunality: Haut Limousin en Marche

Government
  - Mayor (2020–2026): Claude Peyronnet
- Area^{1}: 24.42 km^{2} (9.43 sq mi)
- Elevation: 245 m (804 ft)
- Highest elevation: 301 m (988 ft)
- Lowest elevation: 175 m (574 ft)
- Population (2023): 3,537
  - Density: 144.8/km^{2} (375.1/sq mi)
- Time zone: UTC+01:00 (CET)
  - Summer (DST): UTC+02:00 (CEST)
- INSEE/Postal code: 87011 /87300
- ^{1} French Land Register data, which excludes lakes, ponds, glaciers > 1 km^{2} (0.386 sq mi or 247 acres) and river estuaries.

Bellac (French pronunciation: [bɛlak]; Occitan: Belac [beˈlak]) is a commune in the Haute-Vienne department in the Nouvelle-Aquitaine region in western France.

Bellac is where the French author Jean Giraudoux, writer of L'Apollon de Bellac, was born in 1882. His house has been turned into a museum.

== Geography ==
Bellac lies 45 km (28 mi) northwest of Limoges at the confluence of the rivers Gartempe and Vincou, in the Department of Haute-Vienne. Poitiers is 70 km (43 mi) to the northwest, and Angoulême 100 km (62 mi) to the southwest. The hills known as the Monts de Blond lie immediately to the south.

== Administration ==
Bellac is a sous-préfecture of Haute-Vienne, seat of the arrondissement of Bellac which covers 57 communes. Furthernore, it is part of the canton of Bellac and of the communauté de communes Haut Limousin en Marche.

== Population ==
Historical population
| Year | Pop. | ±% p.a. |
|---|---|---|
| 1968 | 5,240 | — |
| 1975 | 5,360 | +0.32% |
| 1982 | 5,079 | −0.77% |
| 1990 | 4,924 | −0.39% |
| 1999 | 4,576 | −0.81% |
| 2007 | 4,401 | −0.49% |
| 2012 | 4,211 | −0.88% |
| 2017 | 3,808 | −1.99% |
| 2023 | 3,537 | −1.22% |
Source: INSEE

Inhabitants are known as Bellachons in French.

== Transport ==
Bellac is 30 km (19 mi) west of the A20 Limoges-Orléans motorway, and lies at a crossroads where the RN145 crosses the RN147. Both these roads had been designated part of the Route Centre-Europe Atlantique (RCEA) and were thus at risk of being upgraded to motorway. However, the latest thinking is that the RCEA will be re-routed from La Souterraine south down the A20 to Limoges and then via upgraded to the N520/N141 routes to Angoulême and the west.

== Classifications ==
Bellac is classified as a Petites Cités de Caractère, a village étape, a station verte de vacances, and a station touristique.

== Notable people ==
- Jean Giraudoux (1882–1944), writer, dramatist and playwright, was born in Bellac
- Charles Silvestre (1889–1948), writer, winner of the Prix Femina in 1926, died in Bellac

== Climate ==
Climate data for Bellac (1996–2010 normals, extremes 1996–2012)
| Month | Jan | Feb | Mar | Apr | May | Jun | Jul | Aug | Sep | Oct | Nov | Dec | Year |
|---|---|---|---|---|---|---|---|---|---|---|---|---|---|
| Record high °C (°F) | 18.2 (64.8) | 23.3 (73.9) | 25.2 (77.4) | 30.5 (86.9) | 32.2 (90.0) | 36.9 (98.4) | 36.5 (97.7) | 39.5 (103.1) | 34.2 (93.6) | 29.0 (84.2) | 22.3 (72.1) | 17.7 (63.9) | 39.5 (103.1) |
| Mean daily maximum °C (°F) | 8.1 (46.6) | 9.8 (49.6) | 13.3 (55.9) | 16.0 (60.8) | 20.2 (68.4) | 24.1 (75.4) | 25.6 (78.1) | 26.0 (78.8) | 22.3 (72.1) | 17.6 (63.7) | 11.2 (52.2) | 8.2 (46.8) | 16.9 (62.4) |
| Daily mean °C (°F) | 4.8 (40.6) | 5.7 (42.3) | 8.3 (46.9) | 10.6 (51.1) | 14.6 (58.3) | 18.0 (64.4) | 19.4 (66.9) | 19.6 (67.3) | 16.0 (60.8) | 13.0 (55.4) | 7.6 (45.7) | 4.9 (40.8) | 11.9 (53.4) |
| Mean daily minimum °C (°F) | 1.6 (34.9) | 1.6 (34.9) | 3.3 (37.9) | 5.2 (41.4) | 9.0 (48.2) | 12.0 (53.6) | 13.1 (55.6) | 13.1 (55.6) | 9.8 (49.6) | 8.4 (47.1) | 3.9 (39.0) | 1.6 (34.9) | 6.9 (44.4) |
| Record low °C (°F) | −11.9 (10.6) | −17.5 (0.5) | −12.6 (9.3) | −3.4 (25.9) | −1.4 (29.5) | 2.9 (37.2) | 5.0 (41.0) | 3.7 (38.7) | −1.3 (29.7) | −6.9 (19.6) | −10.0 (14.0) | −12.8 (9.0) | −17.5 (0.5) |
| Average precipitation mm (inches) | 76.4 (3.01) | 65.8 (2.59) | 73.7 (2.90) | 86.5 (3.41) | 88.9 (3.50) | 64.7 (2.55) | 59.9 (2.36) | 74.4 (2.93) | 62.6 (2.46) | 85.4 (3.36) | 97.5 (3.84) | 86.5 (3.41) | 922.3 (36.31) |
| Average precipitation days (≥ 1.0 mm) | 13.1 | 10.1 | 10.4 | 12.2 | 11.7 | 8.5 | 9.4 | 9.3 | 8.9 | 11.5 | 14.7 | 12.6 | 132.5 |
Source: Meteociel

== See also ==
- Communes of the Haute-Vienne department
