= Darnac =

- Part of Val-d'Oire-et-Gartempe
- Location of Darnac
- Location within France Location within Nouvelle-Aquitaine
- Coordinates: 46°13′28″N 0°57′38″E
- Country: France
- Region: Nouvelle-Aquitaine
- Department: Haute-Vienne
- Arrondissement: Bellac
- Canton: Châteauponsac
- Commune: Val-d'Oire-et-Gartempe
- Area^{1}: 25.93 km^{2} (10.01 sq mi)
- Highest elevation: 267 m (876 ft)
- Lowest elevation: 125 m (410 ft)
- Population (2022): 349
  - Density: 13.5/km^{2} (34.9/sq mi)
- Time zone: UTC+01:00 (CET)
  - Summer (DST): UTC+02:00 (CEST)
- Postal code: 87320
- ^{1} French Land Register data, which excludes lakes, ponds, glaciers > 1 km^{2} (0.386 sq mi or 247 acres) and river estuaries.

Darnac (French pronunciation: [daʁnak]; Occitan: Darnac) is a former commune in the Haute-Vienne department in the Nouvelle-Aquitaine region in western France. On 1 January 2019, it was merged into the new commune Val-d'Oire-et-Gartempe.

== Geography ==
The river Brame forms all of the commune's northern border, then flows into the Gartempe, which forms all of its western border.

Inhabitants are known as Darnachauds.

== See also ==
- Communes of the Haute-Vienne department
