= Droux =

- Commune
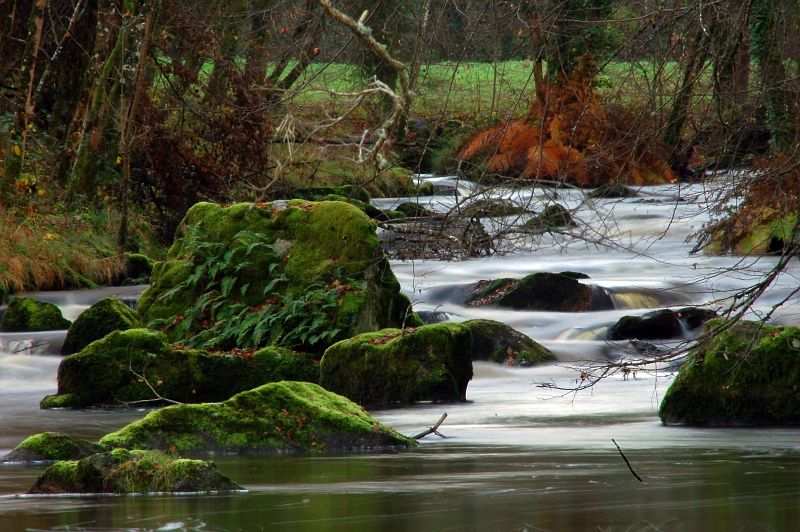
- The Semme river near Droux

- Coat of arms
- Location of Droux
- Location within France Location within Nouvelle-Aquitaine
- Coordinates: 46°09′36″N 1°09′12″E
- Country: France
- Region: Nouvelle-Aquitaine
- Department: Haute-Vienne
- Arrondissement: Bellac
- Canton: Châteauponsac

Government
  - Mayor (2020–2026): Madeleine Saillard
- Area^{1}: 23.98 km^{2} (9.26 sq mi)
- Highest elevation: 316 m (1,037 ft)
- Lowest elevation: 181 m (594 ft)
- Population (2023): 378
  - Density: 15.8/km^{2} (40.8/sq mi)
- Time zone: UTC+01:00 (CET)
  - Summer (DST): UTC+02:00 (CEST)
- INSEE/Postal code: 87061 /87190
- ^{1} French Land Register data, which excludes lakes, ponds, glaciers > 1 km^{2} (0.386 sq mi or 247 acres) and river estuaries.

Droux (French pronunciation: [dʁu]; Occitan: Drolh) is a commune in the Haute-Vienne department in the Nouvelle-Aquitaine region in western France.

== Geography ==
The river Semme forms most of the commune's southwestern border, flows southwest through the middle of the commune, then flows into the Gartempe, which forms the commune's southern border.

Inhabitants are known as Drouniers.

== See also ==
- Communes of the Haute-Vienne department
