= Saint-Ouen-sur-Gartempe =

- Commune
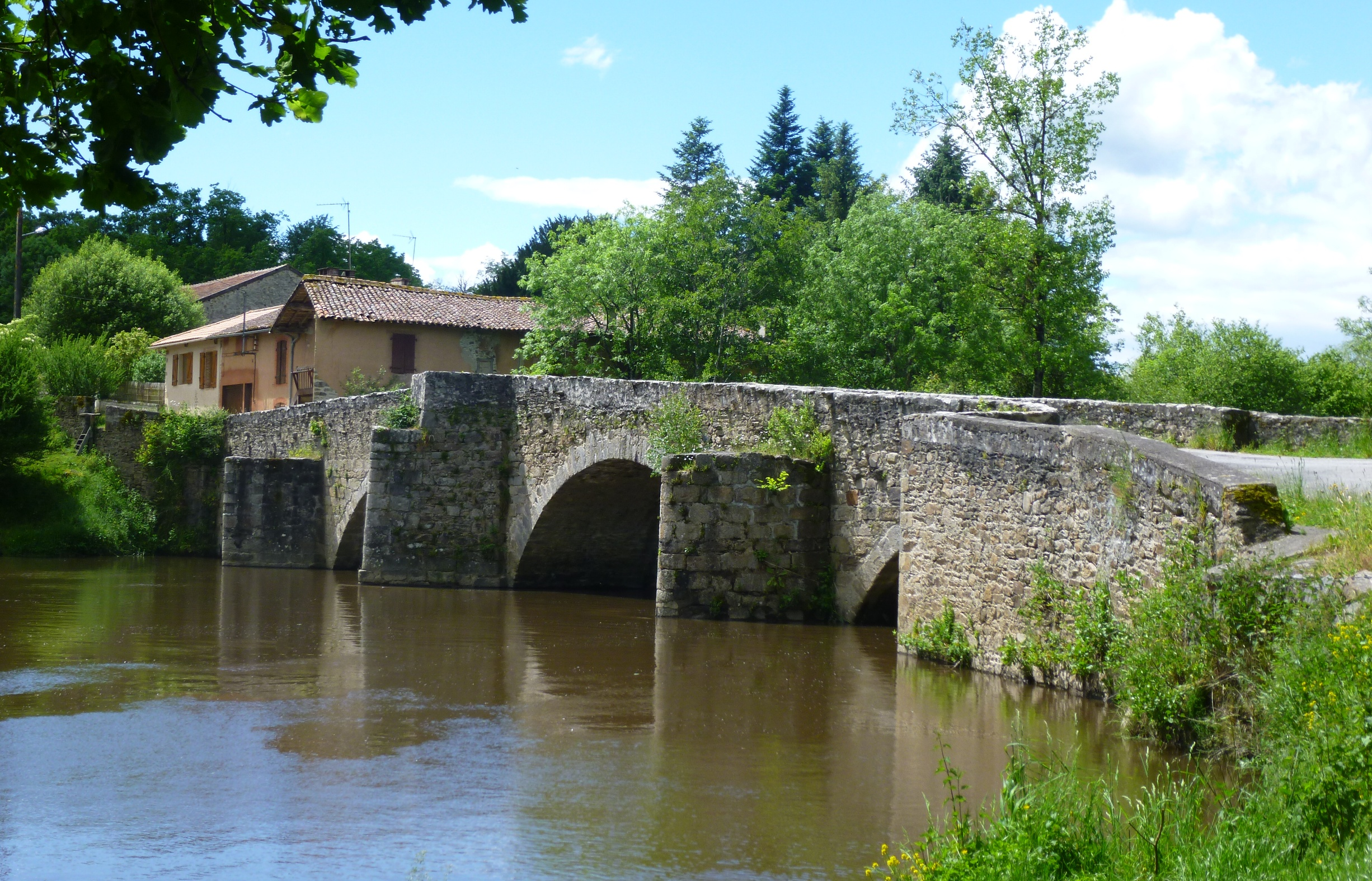
- The Gothic Bridge in Saint-Ouen-sur-Gartempe

- Coat of arms
- Location of Saint-Ouen-sur-Gartempe
- Location within France Location within Nouvelle-Aquitaine
- Coordinates: 46°09′51″N 1°04′07″E
- Country: France
- Region: Nouvelle-Aquitaine
- Department: Haute-Vienne
- Arrondissement: Bellac
- Canton: Châteauponsac
- Intercommunality: Haut-Limousin en Marche

Government
  - Mayor (2020–2026): Alain Fioux
- Area^{1}: 22.12 km^{2} (8.54 sq mi)
- Highest elevation: 277 m (909 ft)
- Lowest elevation: 167 m (548 ft)
- Population (2023): 214
  - Density: 9.67/km^{2} (25.1/sq mi)
- Time zone: UTC+01:00 (CET)
  - Summer (DST): UTC+02:00 (CEST)
- INSEE/Postal code: 87172 /87300
- ^{1} French Land Register data, which excludes lakes, ponds, glaciers > 1 km^{2} (0.386 sq mi or 247 acres) and river estuaries.

Saint-Ouen-sur-Gartempe (French pronunciation: [sɛ̃.t‿wɛ̃ syʁ ɡaʁtɑ̃p], literally Saint-Ouen on Gartempe; Limousin: Sent Oen) is a commune in the Haute-Vienne department in the Nouvelle-Aquitaine region in west-central France.

== See also ==
- Communes of the Haute-Vienne department
