= Bussière-Poitevine =

- Part of Val-d'Oire-et-Gartempe
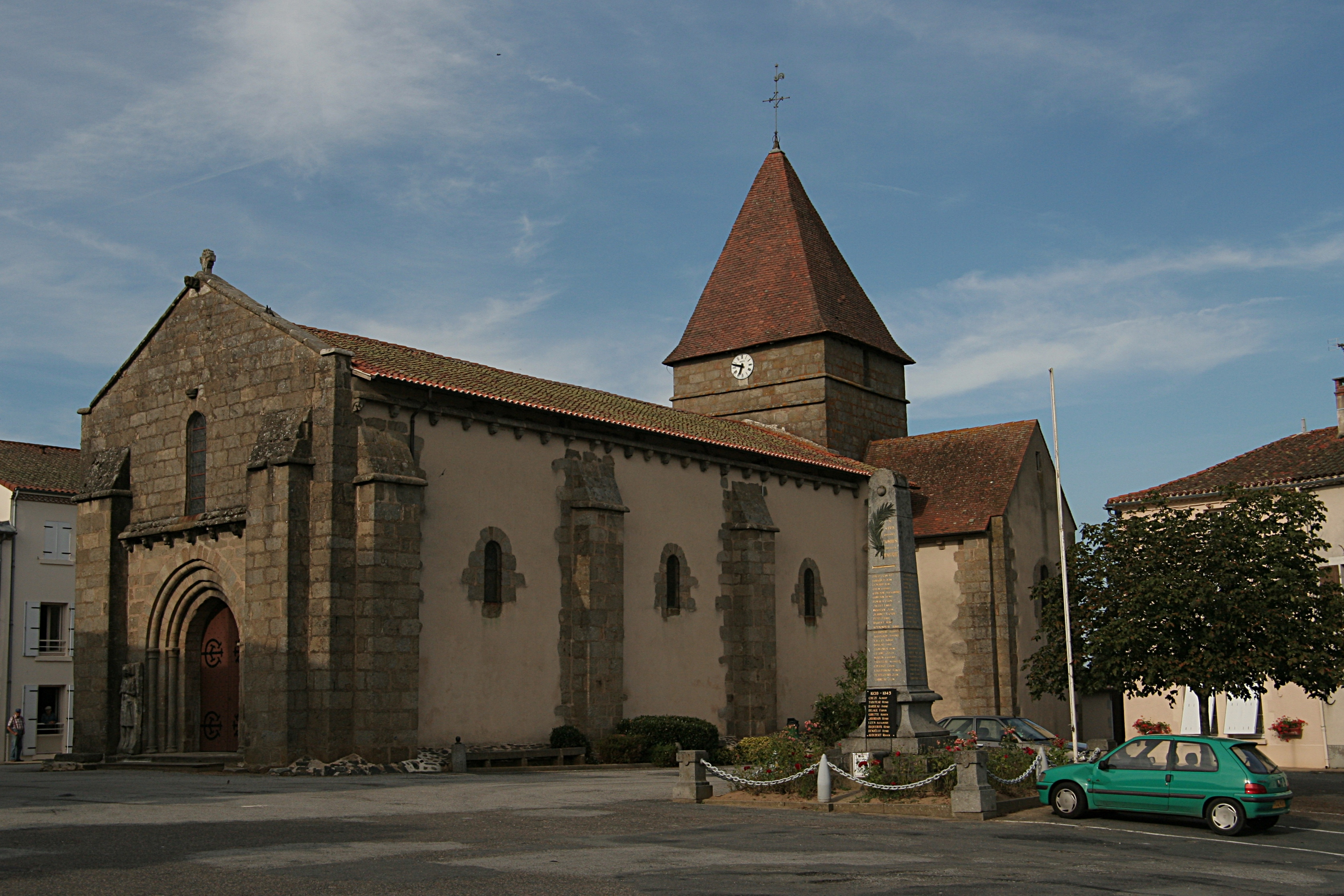
- The church of Saint-Maurice, in Bussière-Poitevine

- Coat of arms
- Location of Bussière-Poitevine
- Location within France Location within Nouvelle-Aquitaine
- Coordinates: 46°14′11″N 0°54′20″E
- Country: France
- Region: Nouvelle-Aquitaine
- Department: Haute-Vienne
- Arrondissement: Bellac
- Canton: Bellac
- Commune: Val-d'Oire-et-Gartempe
- Area^{1}: 41.71 km^{2} (16.10 sq mi)
- Highest elevation: 242 m (794 ft)
- Lowest elevation: 122 m (400 ft)
- Population (2022): 866
  - Density: 20.8/km^{2} (53.8/sq mi)
- Time zone: UTC+01:00 (CET)
  - Summer (DST): UTC+02:00 (CEST)
- Postal code: 87320
- ^{1} French Land Register data, which excludes lakes, ponds, glaciers > 1 km^{2} (0.386 sq mi or 247 acres) and river estuaries.

Bussière-Poitevine (French pronunciation: [bysjɛʁ pwatvin]; Occitan: Bussiera) is a village and former commune in the Haute-Vienne department in the Nouvelle-Aquitaine region in western France. On 1 January 2019, it was merged into the new commune Val-d'Oire-et-Gartempe.

== Geography ==
The river Gartempe forms all of the commune's eastern border.

== See also ==
- Communes of the Haute-Vienne department
