= Ethel Clement =

American artist

Ethel Clement (1874–1920) was an American artist. Born in San Francisco in 1874, she was the daughter of Lyman H. Clement and Emma Frances ("Franc") Clement. She was a cousin to Amy Marcy Cheney. Her studies began in San Francisco with drawing from the antique and from life under Fred Yates. She studied in New York City under Kenyon Cox. At the Cowles Art School, Boston, and the Art Students League of New York, she spent three winters, and at the Académie Julian, Paris, three other winters, drawing from life and painting in oils under the teaching of Jules Joseph Lefebvre and Tony Robert-Fleury, supplementing these studies by that of landscape in oils under Georges Laugée in Picardy. Clement received several awards from California State Fair exhibits, and her pastel portrait of her mother was hung on the line at the Paris Salon of 1898. She was a Member of the San Francisco Art Association and of the Sketch Club of that city. She worked for a year as an art teacher at Miss West's School in San Francisco (1906-1907), and for two years as superintendent of the San Francisco Reading Room and Library for the Blind (1912-1914). Her portraits, figure subjects, and landscapes are numerous, and are principally in private collections, a large proportion being in San Francisco. Her later work included landscape painting in New England. In 1903, she exhibited a number of pictures in Boston which attracted favorable attention. She lived in San Francisco until 1916, when she and her mother, Franc, abruptly left Lyman behind and moved to Hillsborough, New Hampshire (Franc's hometown) with her composer cousin Amy Beach. In New Hampshire, Ethel worked as a drawing teacher in the Hillsborough Public Schools. She soon developed a terminal illness and was cared for by Amy Beach for two years until her death in 1920.
