= La Croix-sur-Gartempe =

- Commune
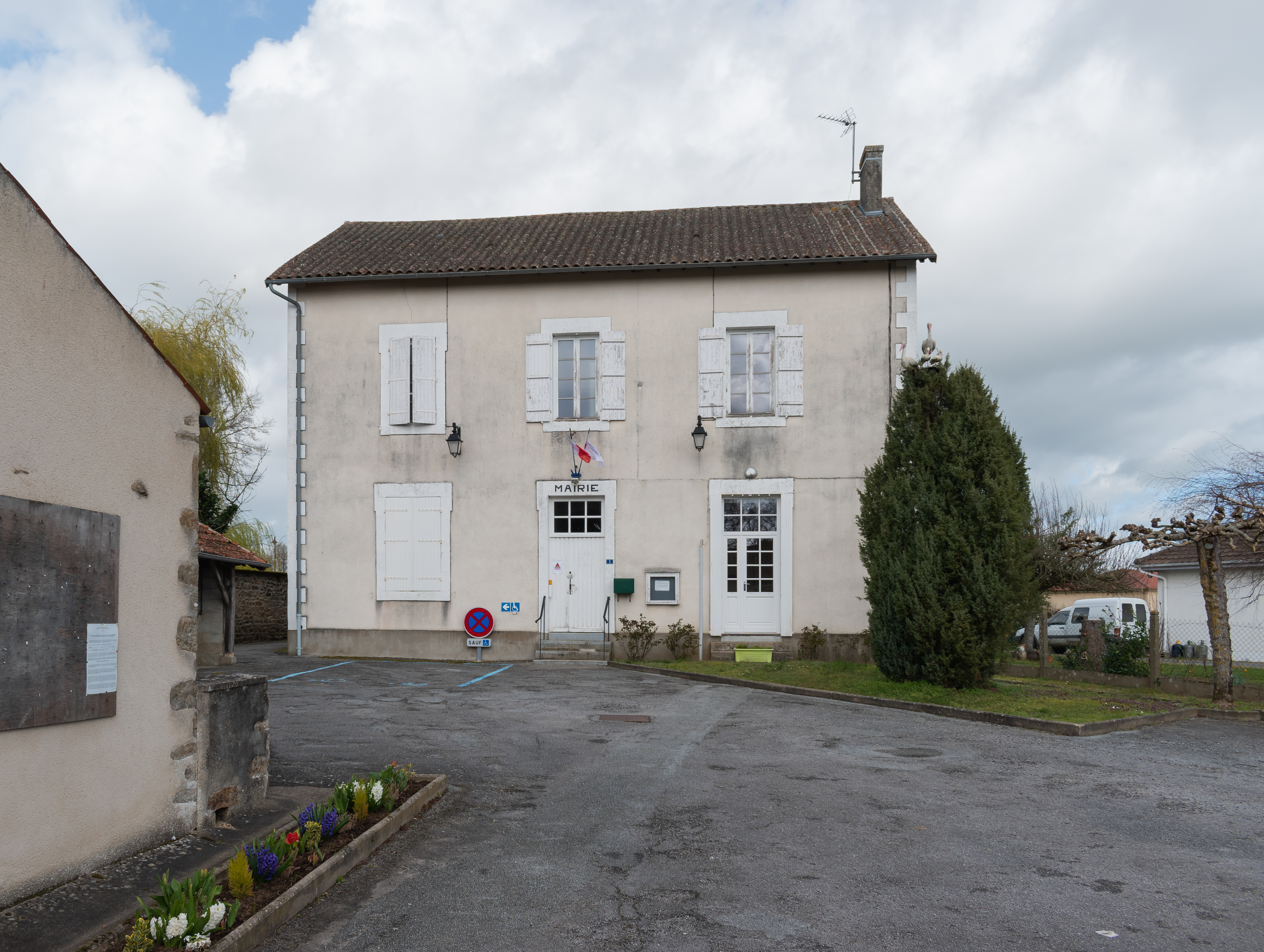
- Town hall of La Croix-sur-Gartempe
- Location of La Croix-sur-Gartempe
- Location within France Location within Nouvelle-Aquitaine
- Coordinates: 46°09′41″N 0°59′27″E
- Country: France
- Region: Nouvelle-Aquitaine
- Department: Haute-Vienne
- Arrondissement: Bellac
- Canton: Châteauponsac

Government
  - Mayor (2020–2026): Alain Pailler
- Area^{1}: 12.74 km^{2} (4.92 sq mi)
- Highest elevation: 275 m (902 ft)
- Lowest elevation: 157 m (515 ft)
- Population (2023): 161
  - Density: 12.6/km^{2} (32.7/sq mi)
- Time zone: UTC+01:00 (CET)
  - Summer (DST): UTC+02:00 (CEST)
- INSEE/Postal code: 87052 /87210
- ^{1} French Land Register data, which excludes lakes, ponds, glaciers > 1 km^{2} (0.386 sq mi or 247 acres) and river estuaries.

La Croix-sur-Gartempe (French pronunciation: [la kʁwa syʁ ɡaʁtɑ̃p], literally La Croix on Gartempe; Occitan: La Crotz) is a commune in the Haute-Vienne department in the Nouvelle-Aquitaine region in western France.

== See also ==
- Communes of the Haute-Vienne department
