= Semme =

River in France

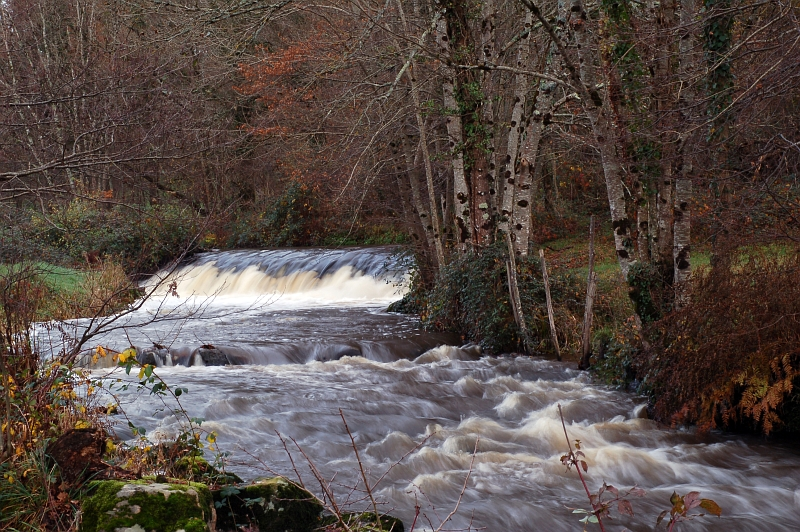
- The Semme near Droux

- Location within France Location within Nouvelle-Aquitaine

Location
- Country: France

Physical characteristics
- Source
  - location: Saint-Priest-la-Feuille
  - coordinates: 46°11′47″N 01°32′20″E
  - elevation: 405 m (1,329 ft)
- Mouth
  - location: Gartempe
  - coordinates: 46°08′42″N 01°07′12″E
  - elevation: 183 m (600 ft)
- Length: 50.3 km (31.3 mi)
- Basin size: 177 km^{2} (68 sq mi)
- Discharge
  - average: 2 m^{3}/s (71 cu ft/s)

Basin features
- Progression: Gartempe→ Creuse→ Vienne→ Loire→ Atlantic Ocean

The Semme (French pronunciation: [sɛm]) is a 50.3-kilometre (31.3 mi) river in the Creuse and Haute-Vienne departments in central France. Its source is in Saint-Priest-la-Feuille. It flows generally west and is a right tributary of the Gartempe, into which it flows near le Bouchard—a hamlet in the municipality of Droux.

== Departments and communes along its course ==
This list is ordered from source to mouth:

- Creuse: Saint-Priest-la-Feuille, Saint-Pierre-de-Fursac, Saint-Maurice-la-Souterraine
- Haute-Vienne: Fromental, Saint-Amand-Magnazeix, Bessines-sur-Gartempe, Châteauponsac, Villefavard, Rancon, Droux
