= Les Grands-Chézeaux =

- Commune
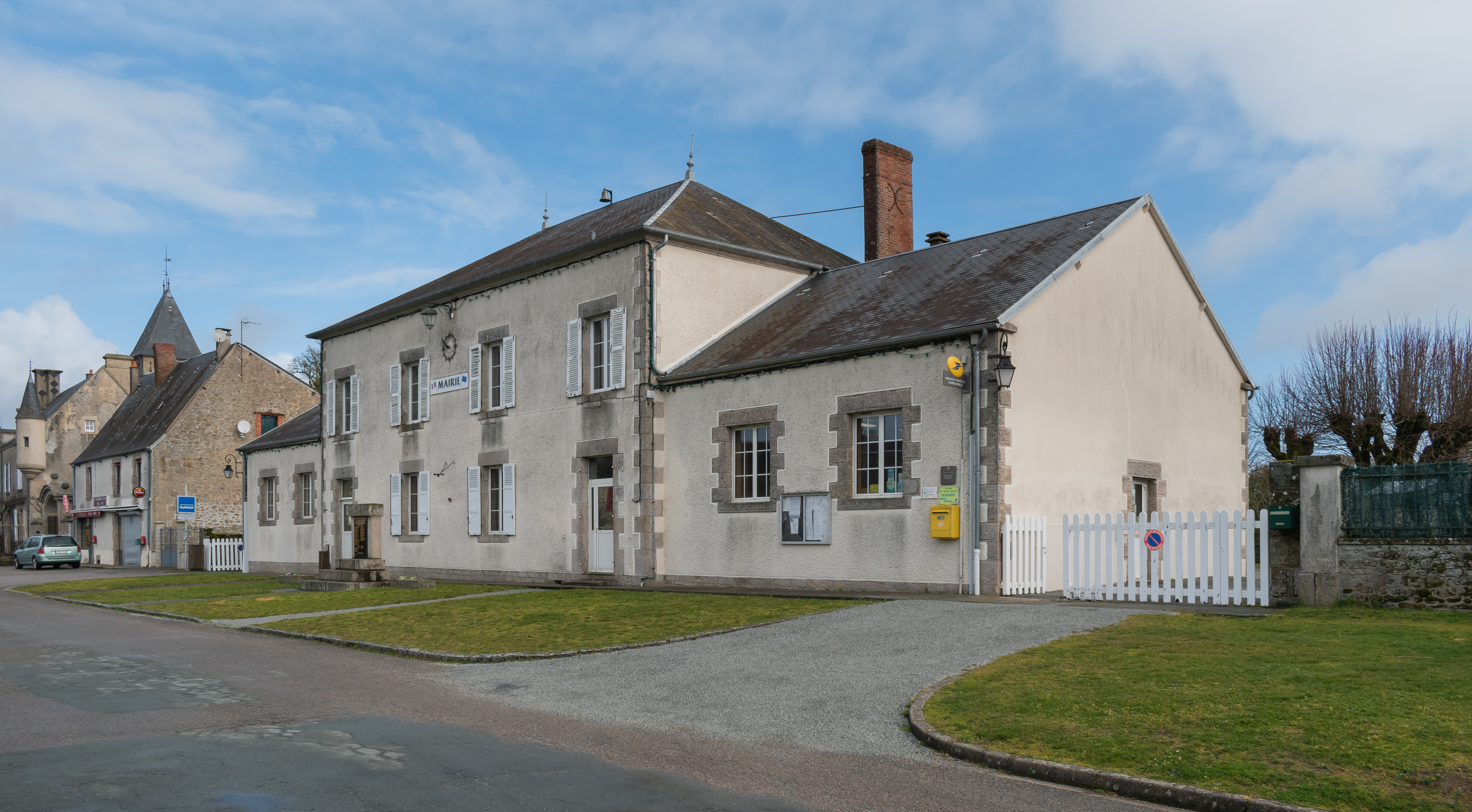
- Town hall of Les Grands-Chézeaux
- Location of Les Grands-Chézeaux
- Location within France Location within Nouvelle-Aquitaine
- Coordinates: 46°21′11″N 1°23′39″E
- Country: France
- Region: Nouvelle-Aquitaine
- Department: Haute-Vienne
- Arrondissement: Bellac
- Canton: Châteauponsac

Government
  - Mayor (2020–2026): Jacques Dufourd
- Area^{1}: 13.51 km^{2} (5.22 sq mi)
- Highest elevation: 341 m (1,119 ft)
- Lowest elevation: 256 m (840 ft)
- Population (2023): 225
  - Density: 16.7/km^{2} (43.1/sq mi)
- Time zone: UTC+01:00 (CET)
  - Summer (DST): UTC+02:00 (CEST)
- INSEE/Postal code: 87074 /87160
- ^{1} French Land Register data, which excludes lakes, ponds, glaciers > 1 km^{2} (0.386 sq mi or 247 acres) and river estuaries.

Les Grands-Chézeaux (French pronunciation: [le ɡʁɑ̃ ʃezo]; Occitan: Lòs Seujaus) is a commune in the Haute-Vienne department in the Nouvelle-Aquitaine region in west-central France.

Inhabitants are known as Chézaliens.

== See also ==
- Communes of the Haute-Vienne department
