= La Bazeuge =

- Commune
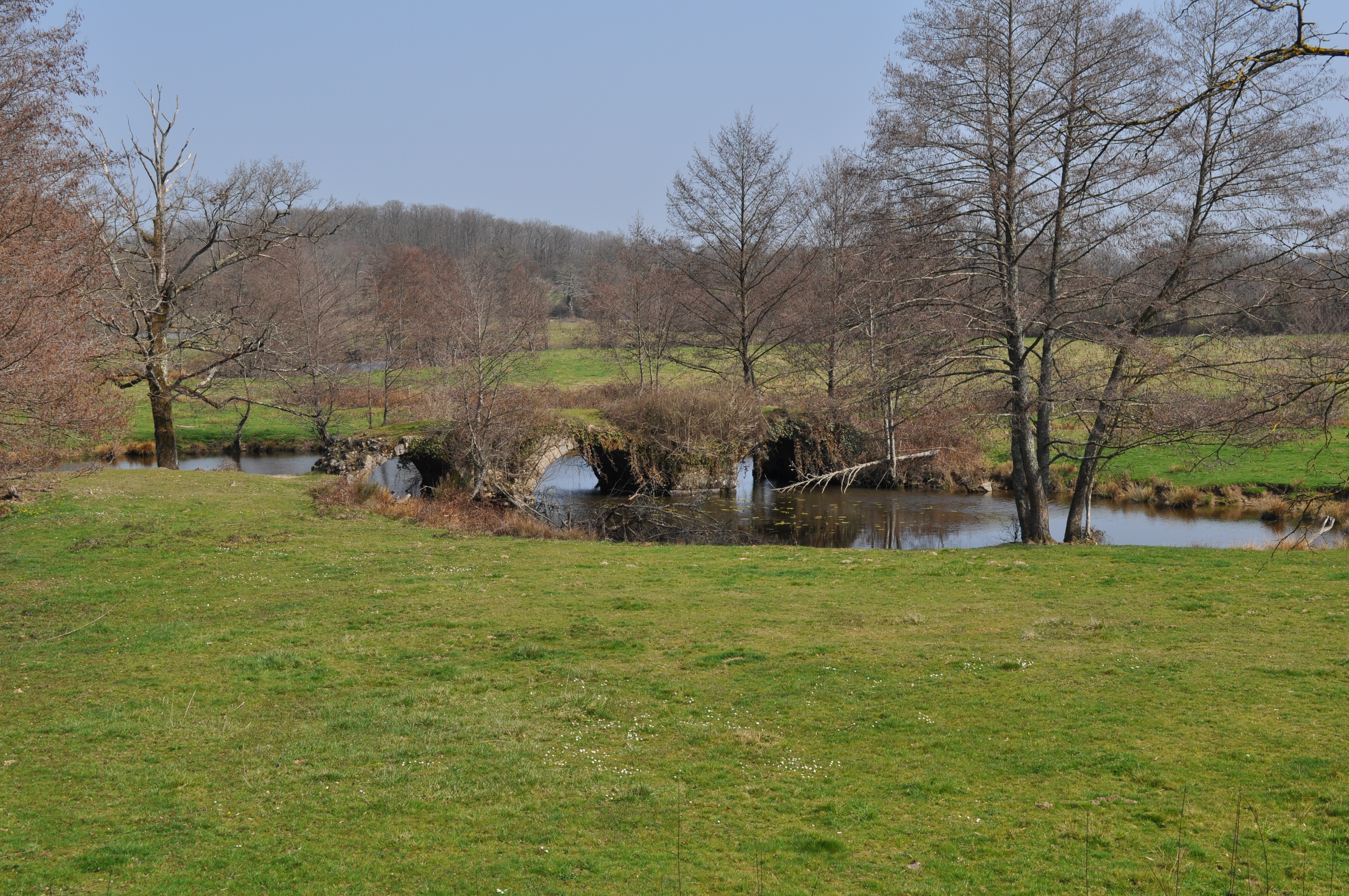
- The Cheix bridge

- Coat of arms
- Location of La Bazeuge
- Location within France Location within Nouvelle-Aquitaine
- Coordinates: 46°14′43″N 1°05′50″E
- Country: France
- Region: Nouvelle-Aquitaine
- Department: Haute-Vienne
- Arrondissement: Bellac
- Canton: Châteauponsac

Government
  - Mayor (2020–2026): Corinne Perrot
- Area^{1}: 10.19 km^{2} (3.93 sq mi)
- Highest elevation: 281 m (922 ft)
- Lowest elevation: 177 m (581 ft)
- Population (2023): 142
  - Density: 13.9/km^{2} (36.1/sq mi)
- Time zone: UTC+01:00 (CET)
  - Summer (DST): UTC+02:00 (CEST)
- INSEE/Postal code: 87008 /87210
- ^{1} French Land Register data, which excludes lakes, ponds, glaciers > 1 km^{2} (0.386 sq mi or 247 acres) and river estuaries.

La Bazeuge (French pronunciation: [la bazœʒ]; Occitan: La Baseuge) is a commune in the Haute-Vienne département in the Nouvelle-Aquitaine region in western France.

Inhabitants are known as Bazeugeois.

== Geography ==
The river Brame forms all of the commune's southern border.

== People ==
- La Bazeuge is the birthplace of Saint Théobald (990–1070).

== See also ==
- Communes of the Haute-Vienne department
