= Saint-Amand-Magnazeix =

- Commune
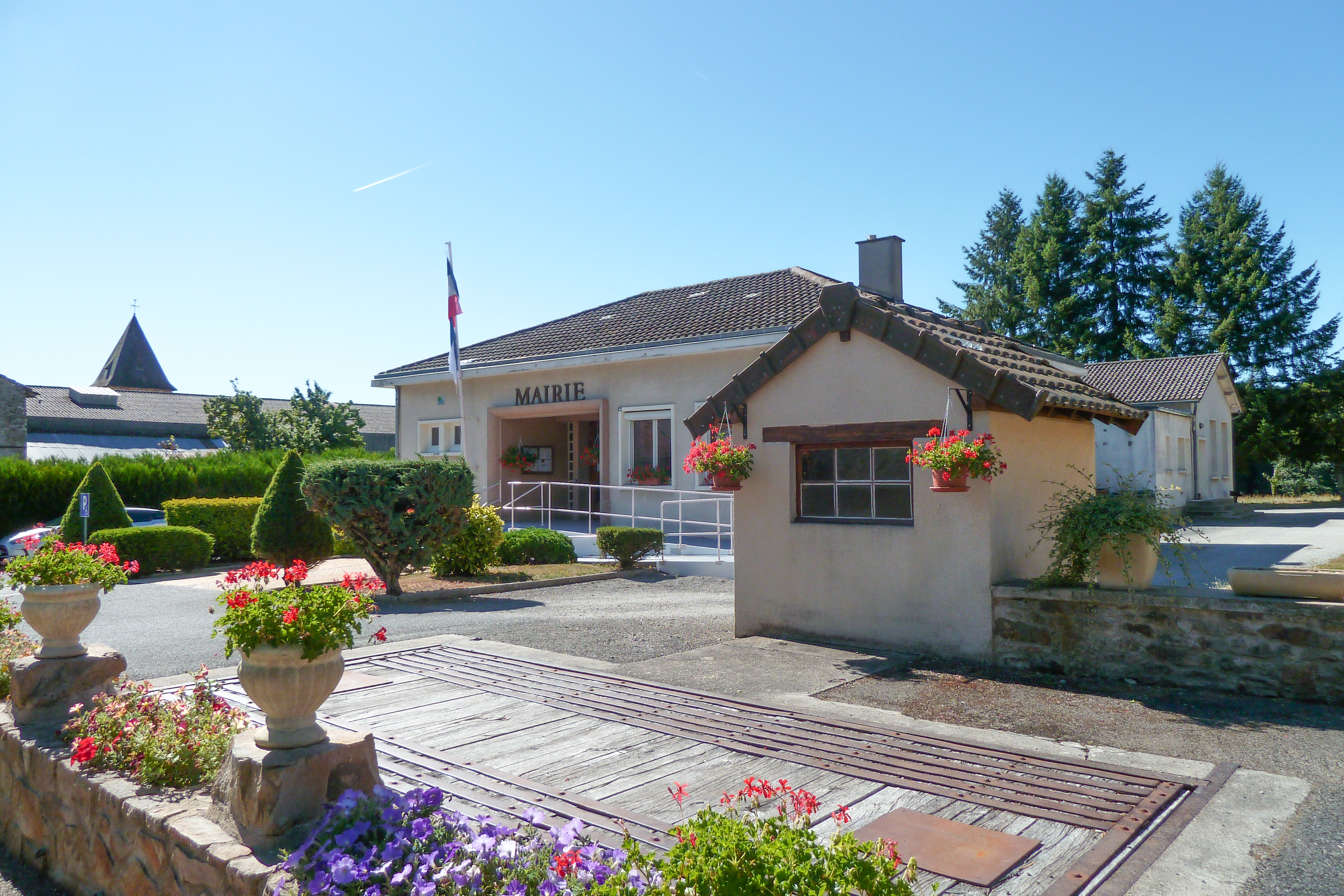
- Town hall
- Location of Saint-Amand-Magnazeix
- Location within France Location within Nouvelle-Aquitaine
- Coordinates: 46°10′30″N 1°21′19″E
- Country: France
- Region: Nouvelle-Aquitaine
- Department: Haute-Vienne
- Arrondissement: Bellac
- Canton: Châteauponsac
- Intercommunality: Gartempe – Saint Pardoux

Government
  - Mayor (2020–2026): Patrice Mirguet
- Area^{1}: 30.71 km^{2} (11.86 sq mi)
- Highest elevation: 389 m (1,276 ft)
- Lowest elevation: 267 m (876 ft)
- Population (2023): 485
  - Density: 15.8/km^{2} (40.9/sq mi)
- Time zone: UTC+01:00 (CET)
  - Summer (DST): UTC+02:00 (CEST)
- INSEE/Postal code: 87133 /87290
- ^{1} French Land Register data, which excludes lakes, ponds, glaciers > 1 km^{2} (0.386 sq mi or 247 acres) and river estuaries.

Saint-Amand-Magnazeix (Limousin: Sent Amand Manhasés) is a commune in the Haute-Vienne department in the Nouvelle-Aquitaine region in west-central France.

== Geography ==
The river Semme forms part of the commune's eastern and southern borders.

== See also ==
- Communes of the Haute-Vienne department
