= Ardour (river) =

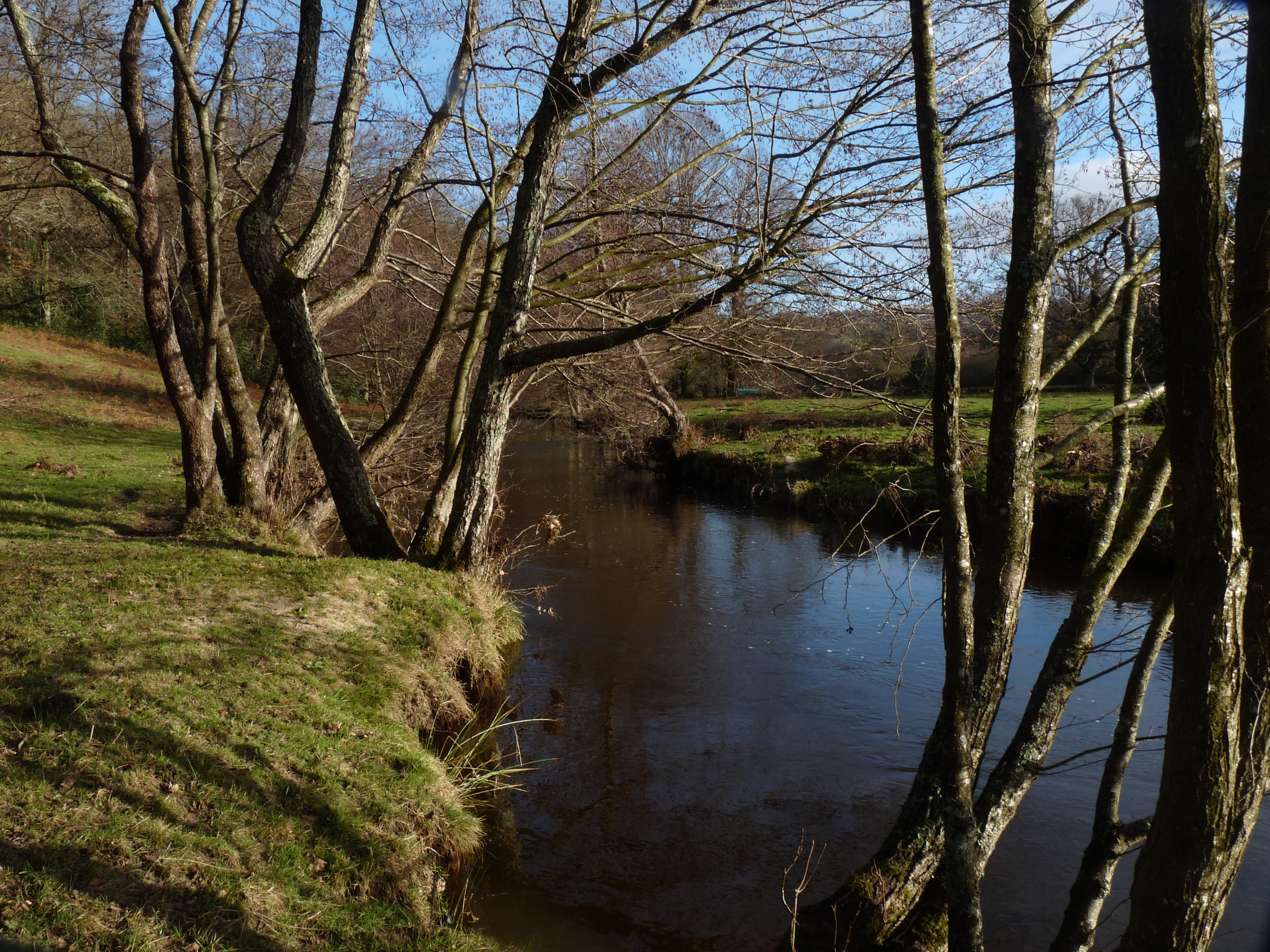

- Location within France Location within Nouvelle-Aquitaine

Location
- Country: France

Physical characteristics
- Source
  - location: Limousin
- Mouth
  - location: Gartempe
  - coordinates: 46°06′51″N 1°26′03″E
- Length: 33.5 km (20.8 mi)

Basin features
- Progression: Gartempe→ Creuse→ Vienne→ Loire→ Atlantic Ocean

The Ardour (French pronunciation: [aʁduʁ]) is a 33.5 km (20.8 mi) long river flowing in the departments of the Creuse and Haute-Vienne, in the Nouvelle-Aquitaine region of France. The river is a tributary of the Gartempe, and so a sub-tributary of the Loire. It flows into the Gartempe near Bersac-sur-Rivalier.
