= Dompierre-les-Églises =

- Commune
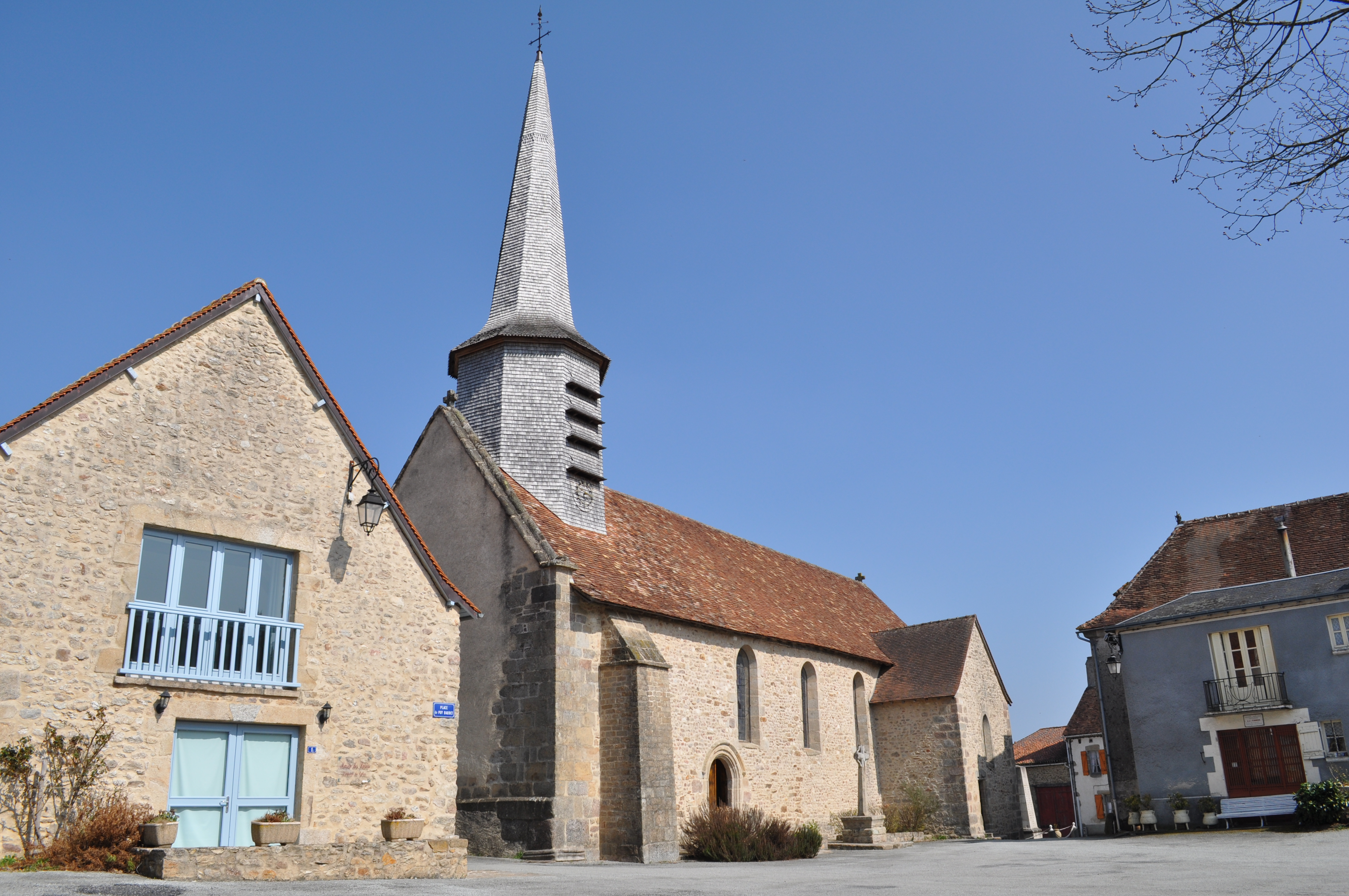
- The church in Dompierre-les-Eglises
- Location of Dompierre-les-Églises
- Location within France Location within Nouvelle-Aquitaine
- Coordinates: 46°13′36″N 1°15′15″E
- Country: France
- Region: Nouvelle-Aquitaine
- Department: Haute-Vienne
- Arrondissement: Bellac
- Canton: Châteauponsac

Government
  - Mayor (2020–2026): Philippe Guibert
- Area^{1}: 30.62 km^{2} (11.82 sq mi)
- Highest elevation: 348 m (1,142 ft)
- Lowest elevation: 225 m (738 ft)
- Population (2023): 375
  - Density: 12.2/km^{2} (31.7/sq mi)
- Time zone: UTC+01:00 (CET)
  - Summer (DST): UTC+02:00 (CEST)
- INSEE/Postal code: 87057 /87190
- ^{1} French Land Register data, which excludes lakes, ponds, glaciers > 1 km^{2} (0.386 sq mi or 247 acres) and river estuaries.

Dompierre-les-Églises (French pronunciation: [dɔ̃pjɛʁ le.z‿eɡliz]; Occitan: Dòmpièrre) is a commune in the Haute-Vienne department in the Nouvelle-Aquitaine region in western France.

== Geography ==
The river Brame flows westward through the commune.

== See also ==
- Communes of the Haute-Vienne department
