= Saint-Léger-Magnazeix =

- Commune
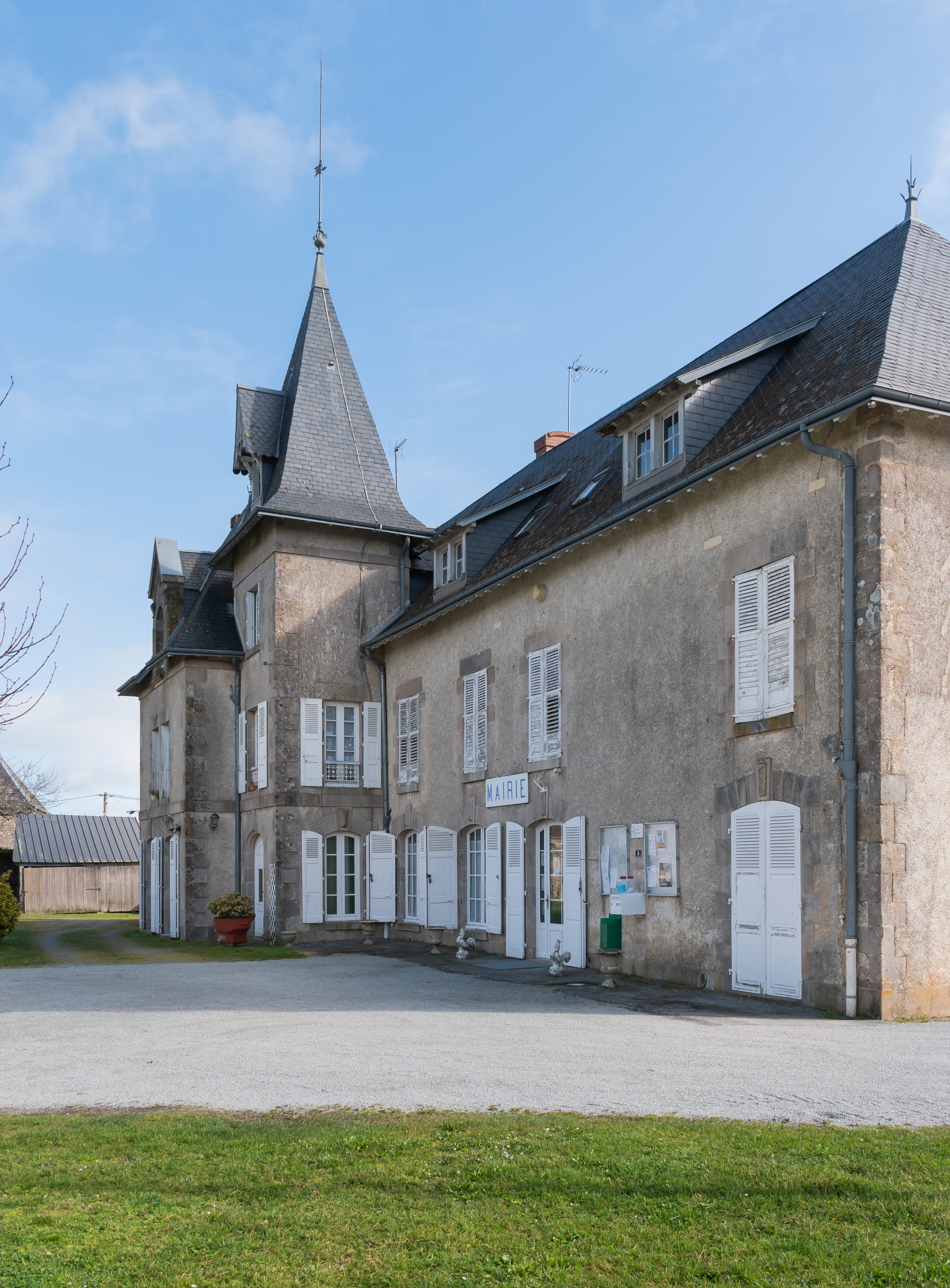
- Town hall of Saint-Leger-Magnazeix

- Coat of arms
- Location of Saint-Léger-Magnazeix
- Location within France Location within Nouvelle-Aquitaine
- Coordinates: 46°17′18″N 1°14′52″E
- Country: France
- Region: Nouvelle-Aquitaine
- Department: Haute-Vienne
- Arrondissement: Bellac
- Canton: Châteauponsac

Government
  - Mayor (2020–2026): Jean-Louis Rouet
- Area^{1}: 55.71 km^{2} (21.51 sq mi)
- Highest elevation: 322 m (1,056 ft)
- Lowest elevation: 199 m (653 ft)
- Population (2023): 484
  - Density: 8.69/km^{2} (22.5/sq mi)
- Time zone: UTC+01:00 (CET)
  - Summer (DST): UTC+02:00 (CEST)
- INSEE/Postal code: 87160 /87190
- ^{1} French Land Register data, which excludes lakes, ponds, glaciers > 1 km^{2} (0.386 sq mi or 247 acres) and river estuaries.

Saint-Léger-Magnazeix (French pronunciation: [sɛ̃ leʒe maɲazɛ]; Occitan: Sent Legíer) is a commune in the Haute-Vienne department in the Nouvelle-Aquitaine region in west-central France.

== See also ==
- Communes of the Haute-Vienne department
