= Brame =

River in France

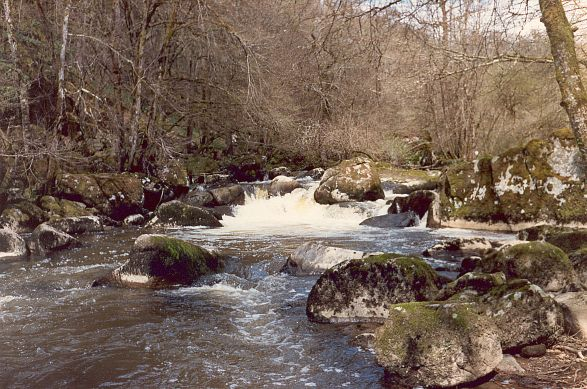

- Location within France Location within Nouvelle-Aquitaine

Location
- Country: France

Physical characteristics
- Source
  - location: La Souterraine
  - coordinates: 46°14′02″N 01°27′29″E
  - elevation: 410 m (1,350 ft)
- Mouth
  - location: Gartempe
  - coordinates: 46°16′33″N 00°56′09″E
  - elevation: 123 m (404 ft)
- Length: 60.4 km (37.5 mi)
- Basin size: 235 km^{2} (91 sq mi)
- Discharge
  - average: 2.3 m^{3}/s (81 cu ft/s)

Basin features
- Progression: Gartempe→ Creuse→ Vienne→ Loire→ Atlantic Ocean

The Brame (French pronunciation: [bʁam]; Occitan: Brama) is a 60.4 km (37.5 mi) long river in the Creuse and Haute-Vienne départements, central France. Its source is at La Souterraine. It flows generally west. It is a right tributary of the Gartempe into which it flows between Thiat and Darnac.

== Communes along its course ==
This list is ordered from source to mouth:

- Creuse: La Souterraine, Saint-Maurice-la-Souterraine
- Haute-Vienne: Arnac-la-Poste, Saint-Hilaire-la-Treille, Saint-Sornin-Leulac, Dompierre-les-Églises, Magnac-Laval, Dinsac, La Bazeuge, Oradour-Saint-Genest, Le Dorat, Thiat, Darnac
