= Abbey Church of Saint-Savin-sur-Gartempe =

UNESCO World Heritage Site
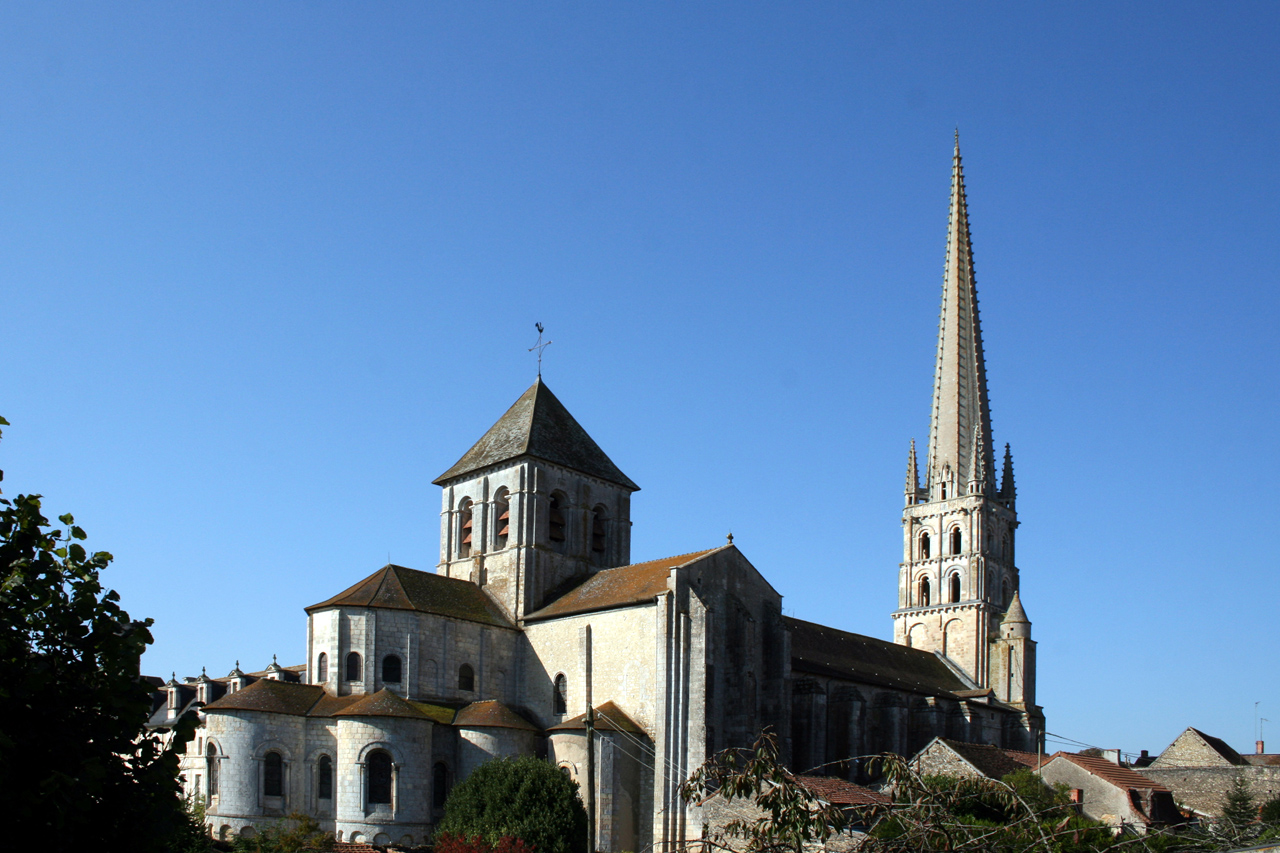

- Location within France
- Location: Saint-Savin, France
- Criteria: Cultural: (i), (iii)
- Reference: 230bis
- Inscription: 1983 (7th Session)
- Website: www.abbaye-saint-savin.fr
- Coordinates: 46°33′51″N 0°51′58″E

The Abbey Church of Saint-Savin-sur-Gartempe is a Roman Catholic church located in Saint-Savin-sur-Gartempe, in Poitou, France. The Romanesque church was begun in the mid-11th century and contains many beautiful 11th- and 12th-century murals which are still in a remarkable state of preservation. The church is often referred to as the "Romanesque Sistine Chapel" and has been a UNESCO World Heritage Site since 1983.

== History ==
The Abbey Church of Saint-Savin sur Gartempe was an ancient abbey that is thought to have been founded by Saint Benoît d’Aniane under the protection of Charlemagne and his immediate successors, although its early history remains obscure. The church was rebuilt starting in 1023. The paintings in the main church are believed to have been painted between 1095 and 1115.

== Description ==
The cruciform church carries a square tower over its crossing. The transept was built first, then the choir with its ambulatory with five radial chapels in the polygonal apse. In the next building campaign, three bays of the nave were added, the bell tower and its porch, and finally the last six bays of the nave. The bell tower is finished by a fine stone spire more than 80 meters high, added in the 14th century and restored in the 19th century. The barrel vaulted nave is supported on magnificently-scaled columns with foliate capitals.

Nearly all parts of church are covered in painted murals, depicting scenes from across the Bible. The murals in the doorway describe the Apocalypse, while the gallery holds scenes from the Passion of Christ. In the choir and on the piers of the transept are images of the saints, and the vault describes scenes from the books of Genesis and Exodus. Below the church is the crypt of the martyr brothers St Savin and St Cyprian, decorated with frescos depicting scenes from their lives.

Although these paintings are beautiful decorations, there was also an educational purpose. As such, the images had to be intelligible from ground level. There was an effort to make the outlines pop and to use broad areas of colors. The stylistic tendencies that are present within the Abbey Church of St. Savin Gartempe follow the Angevin style, characterized by linear designs, which are often flat, and using color silhouettes to further the contrast of the light and dark grounds. To this day, the colors are still impressively vibrant, giving us a glimpse of the colored surfaces of sculptures and other paintings from the period that are now lost.

== Gallery ==
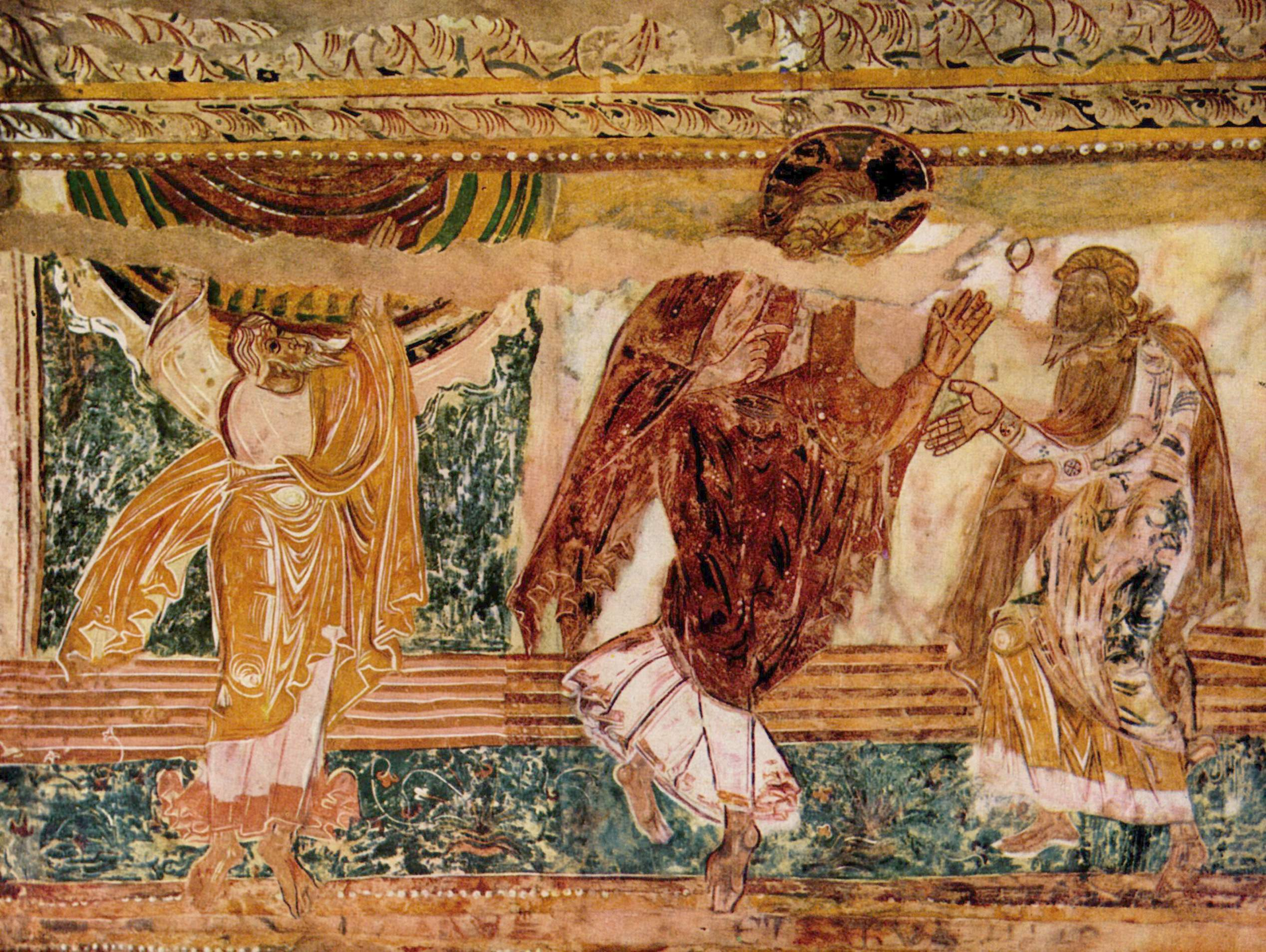
12th century Romanesque mural (God speaks to Noah)

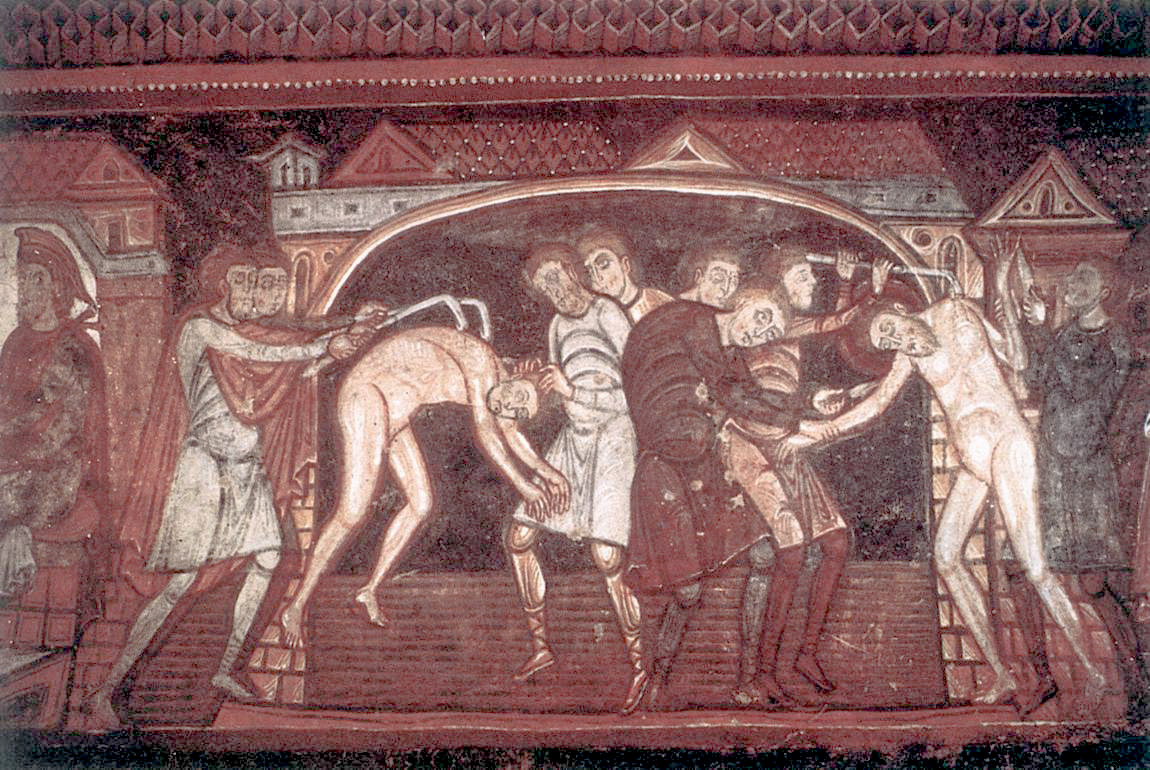
Fresco, Sts Savinus and Cyprian are tortured

== See also ==
- French Romanesque architecture
- List of Word Heritage Sites in France
