= Val-d'Oire-et-Gartempe =

- Commune
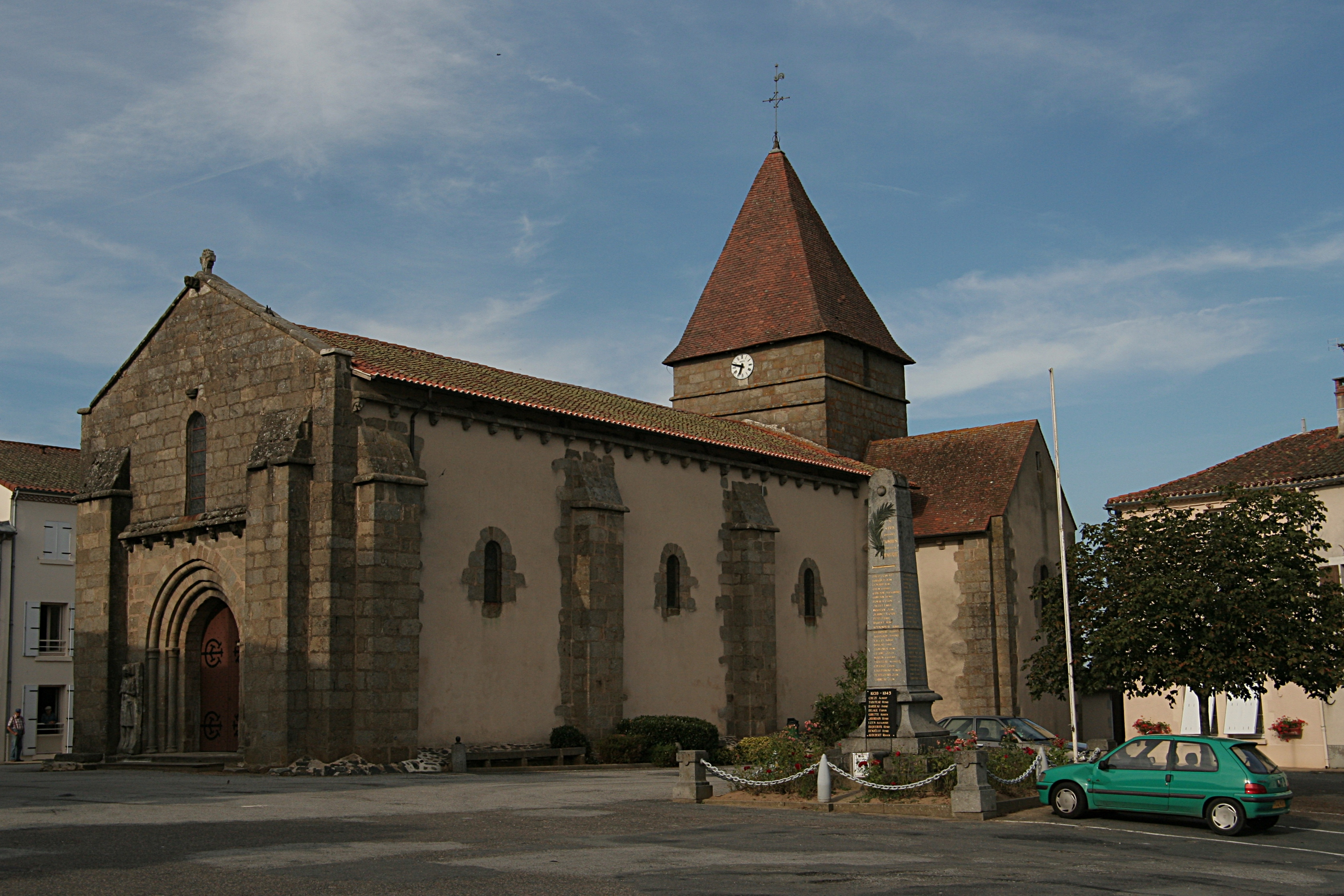
- The church of Saint-Maurice, in Bussière-Poitevine
- Location of Val-d'Oire-et-Gartempe
- Location within France Location within Nouvelle-Aquitaine
- Coordinates: 46°14′11″N 0°54′20″E
- Country: France
- Region: Nouvelle-Aquitaine
- Department: Haute-Vienne
- Arrondissement: Bellac
- Canton: Châteauponsac
- Intercommunality: Haut Limousin en Marche

Government
  - Mayor (2020–2026): André Dubois
- Area^{1}: 121.46 km^{2} (46.90 sq mi)
- Highest elevation: 267 m (876 ft)
- Lowest elevation: 121 m (397 ft)
- Population (2023): 1,711
  - Density: 14.09/km^{2} (36.49/sq mi)
- Time zone: UTC+01:00 (CET)
  - Summer (DST): UTC+02:00 (CEST)
- INSEE/Postal code: 87028 /87320
- ^{1} French Land Register data, which excludes lakes, ponds, glaciers > 1 km^{2} (0.386 sq mi or 247 acres) and river estuaries.

Val-d'Oire-et-Gartempe (French pronunciation: [val dwaʁ e ɡaʁtɑ̃p]; Occitan: Vau d'Oira e Gartempa) is a commune in the Haute-Vienne department in the Nouvelle-Aquitaine region in western France. It was established on 1 January 2019 by merger of the former communes of Bussière-Poitevine (the seat), Darnac, Saint-Barbant and Thiat.

== See also ==
- Communes of the Haute-Vienne department
