= Verneuil-Moustiers =

- Commune
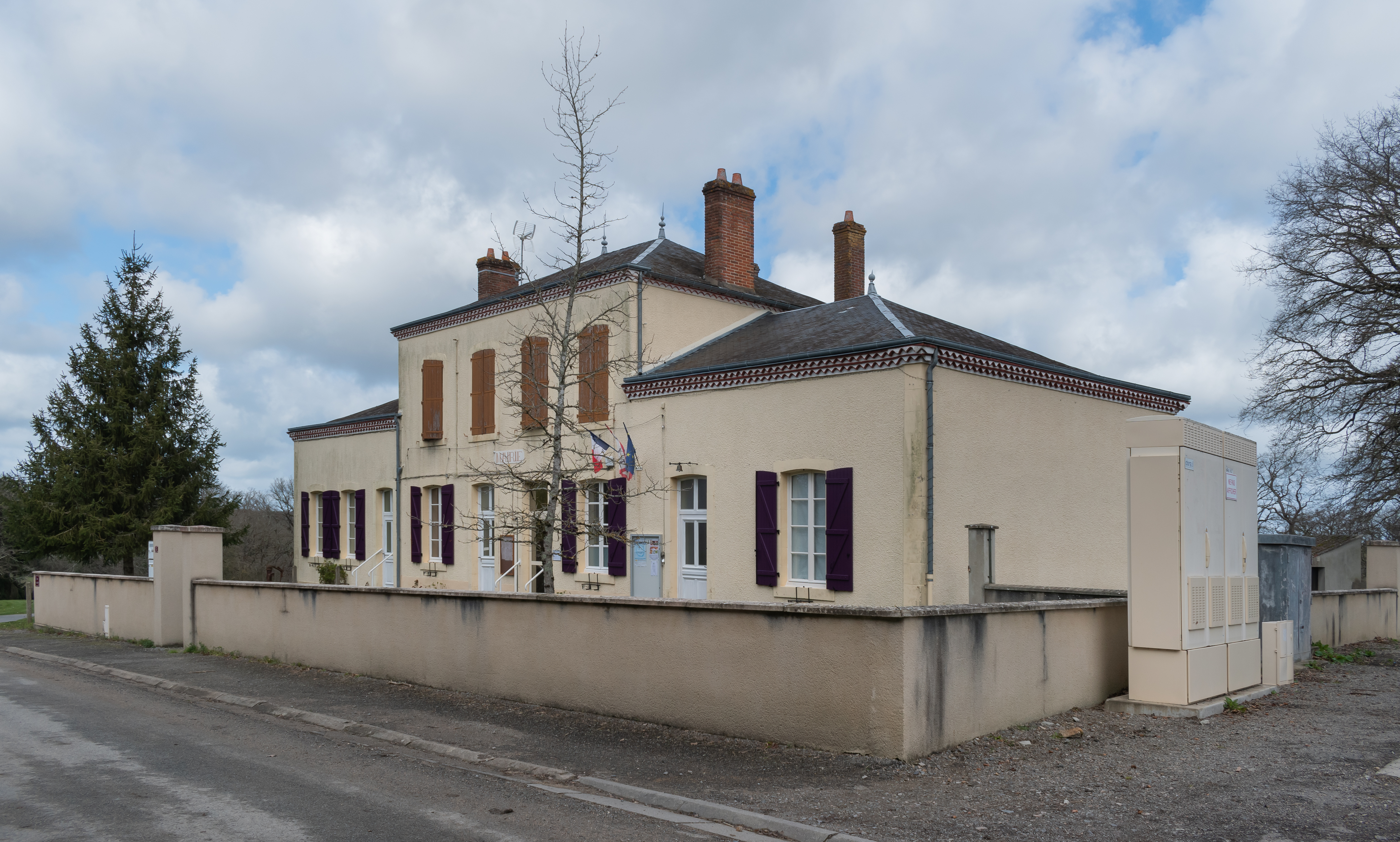
- Town hall of Verneuil-Moustiers

- Coat of arms
- Location of Verneuil-Moustiers
- Location within France Location within Nouvelle-Aquitaine
- Coordinates: 46°20′25″N 1°08′09″E
- Country: France
- Region: Nouvelle-Aquitaine
- Department: Haute-Vienne
- Arrondissement: Bellac
- Canton: Châteauponsac
- Intercommunality: Haut-Limousin en Marche

Government
  - Mayor (2020–2026): Pascal Bregeon
- Area^{1}: 19.39 km^{2} (7.49 sq mi)
- Highest elevation: 226 m (741 ft)
- Lowest elevation: 157 m (515 ft)
- Population (2023): 118
  - Density: 6.09/km^{2} (15.8/sq mi)
- Time zone: UTC+01:00 (CET)
  - Summer (DST): UTC+02:00 (CEST)
- INSEE/Postal code: 87200 /87360
- ^{1} French Land Register data, which excludes lakes, ponds, glaciers > 1 km^{2} (0.386 sq mi or 247 acres) and river estuaries.

Verneuil-Moustiers (French pronunciation: [vɛʁnœj mustje]; Occitan: Vernuelh Mostiér) is a commune in the Haute-Vienne department in the Nouvelle-Aquitaine region in west-central France.

== See also ==
- Communes of the Haute-Vienne department
