= Theobald of Dorat =

French Roman Catholic saint

Saint Théobald (990 in La Bazeuge – November 6, 1070 in Dorat) was a canon regular and French saint.

Attracted by the reputation of Saint Israël, his parents sent him to the chapter at Dorat to study. He completed his studies at Périgueux, staying there several years. On his return, he was admitted to the Chapter. However, out of humility, he refused to be ordained and remained a deacon. As treasurer and sacristan, he was in charge of the administration of the collegial church of Saint-Pierre in Dorat, part of which was already in use, the other still being under construction. Following the example of Israël, he favoured the sick and poor.

He died at Dorat on 6 November 1070, which is his feast day. He is buried in the crypt there with Saint Israël.
