= Saint-Sornin-Leulac =

- Commune
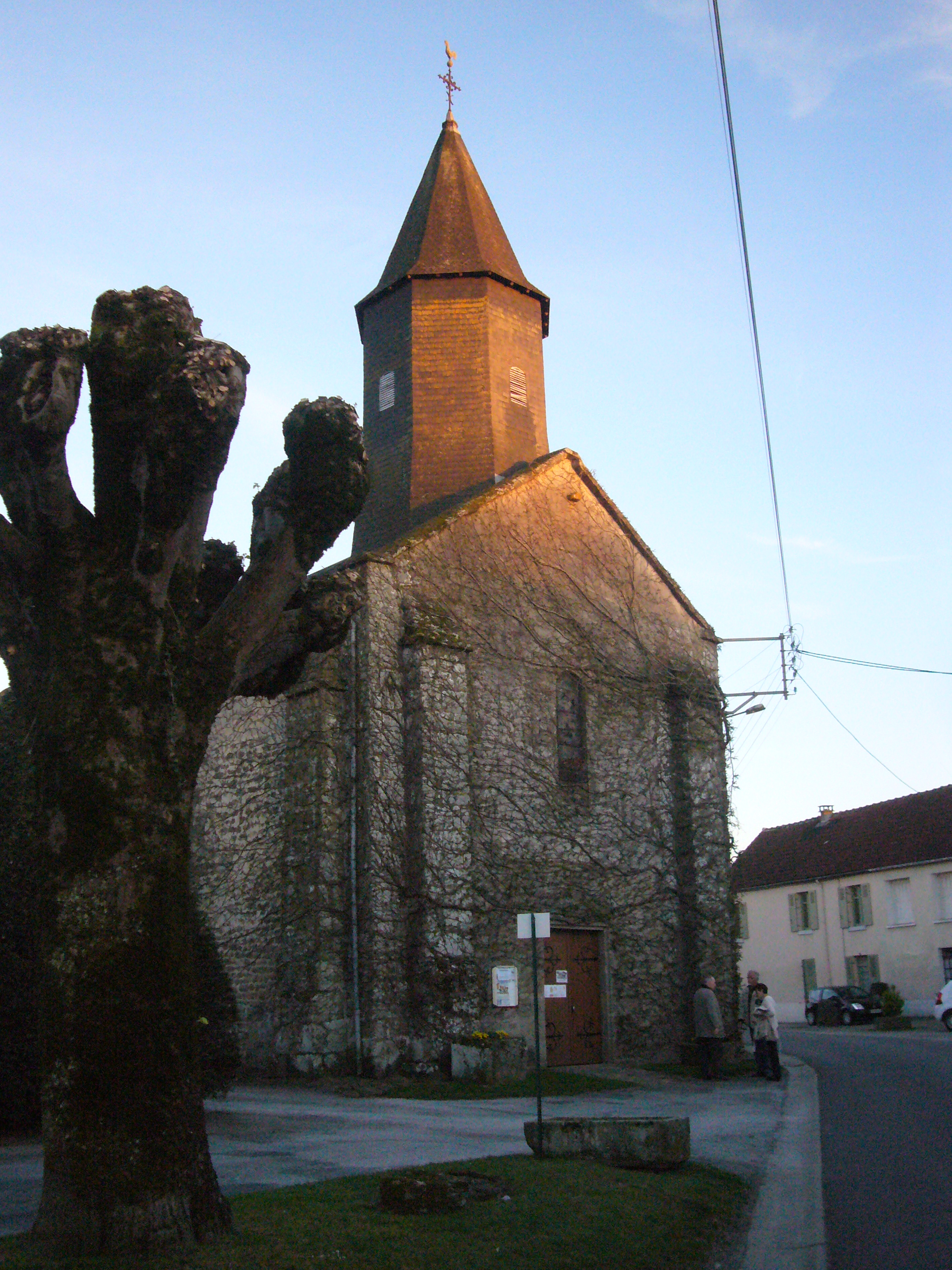
- The church in Saint-Sornin-Leulac

- Coat of arms
- Location of Saint-Sornin-Leulac
- Location within France Location within Nouvelle-Aquitaine
- Coordinates: 46°12′00″N 1°17′54″E
- Country: France
- Region: Nouvelle-Aquitaine
- Department: Haute-Vienne
- Arrondissement: Bellac
- Canton: Châteauponsac
- Intercommunality: Gartempe – Saint Pardoux

Government
  - Mayor (2020–2026): Didier Pinel
- Area^{1}: 32.28 km^{2} (12.46 sq mi)
- Highest elevation: 365 m (1,198 ft)
- Lowest elevation: 246 m (807 ft)
- Population (2023): 564
  - Density: 17.5/km^{2} (45.3/sq mi)
- Time zone: UTC+01:00 (CET)
  - Summer (DST): UTC+02:00 (CEST)
- INSEE/Postal code: 87180 /87290
- ^{1} French Land Register data, which excludes lakes, ponds, glaciers > 1 km^{2} (0.386 sq mi or 247 acres) and river estuaries.

Saint-Sornin-Leulac (French pronunciation: [sɛ̃ sɔʁnɛ̃ lølak]; Occitan: Sent Sòrnin) is a commune in the Haute-Vienne department in the Nouvelle-Aquitaine region in west-central France.

== Geography ==
The river Brame flows westward through the northern part of the commune.

== See also ==
- Communes of the Haute-Vienne department
