= Saint-Savin, Vienne =

Saint-Savin
- Commune
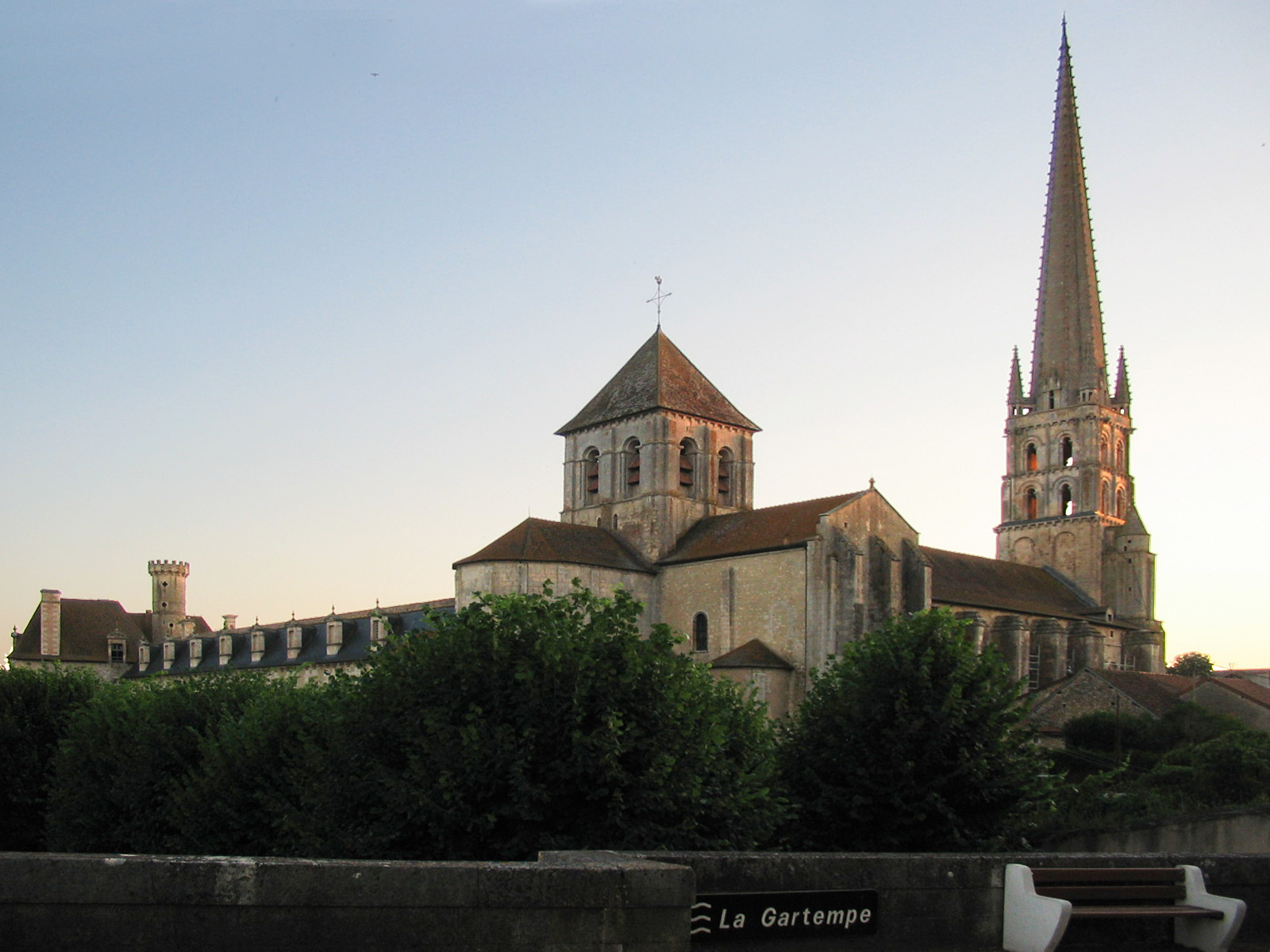
- Abbey Church of Saint-Savin-sur-Gartempe

- Coat of arms
- Location of Saint-Savin
- Location within France Location within Nouvelle-Aquitaine
- Coordinates: 46°34′01″N 0°51′52″E
- Country: France
- Region: Nouvelle-Aquitaine
- Department: Vienne
- Arrondissement: Montmorillon
- Canton: Montmorillon

Government
  - Mayor (2020–2026): Hugues Maillet
- Area^{1}: 18.8 km^{2} (7.3 sq mi)
- Elevation: 80 m (260 ft)
- Highest elevation: 142 m (466 ft)
- Lowest elevation: 72 m (236 ft)
- Population (2023): 816
  - Density: 43.4/km^{2} (112/sq mi)
- Time zone: UTC+01:00 (CET)
  - Summer (DST): UTC+02:00 (CEST)
- INSEE/Postal code: 86246 /86310
- ^{1} French Land Register data, which excludes lakes, ponds, glaciers > 1 km^{2} (0.386 sq mi or 247 acres) and river estuaries.

Saint-Savin (French pronunciation: [sɛ̃ savɛ̃]), also referred to as Saint-Savin-sur-Gartempe (pronounced [sɛ̃ savɛ̃ syʁ ɡaʁtɑ̃p], literally Saint-Savin on Gartempe), is a commune in the Vienne department in the Nouvelle-Aquitaine region in western France. It is located on the banks of the Gartempe.

Saint-Savin also contains a Middle School in the Collége Prosper Mérimée, and a football club that is situated next to the middle school called CA Saint-Savin Saint-Germain, who participate in the Régional 3, the 8th division of French football.

== Abbey Church ==
The Romanesque Abbey Church, begun in the mid 11th century, contains many beautiful 11th- and 12th-century murals which are still in a remarkable state of preservation. It has been a UNESCO World Heritage Site since 1983.

== Demographics ==
Historical population
| Year | Pop. | ±% p.a. |
|---|---|---|
| 1968 | 1,349 | — |
| 1975 | 1,323 | −0.28% |
| 1982 | 1,058 | −3.14% |
| 1990 | 1,089 | +0.36% |
| 1999 | 1,009 | −0.84% |
| 2007 | 913 | −1.24% |
| 2012 | 873 | −0.89% |
| 2017 | 846 | −0.63% |
| 2023 | 816 | −0.60% |
Source: INSEE

== See also ==
- Communes of the Vienne department
