= Magnac-Laval =

- Commune
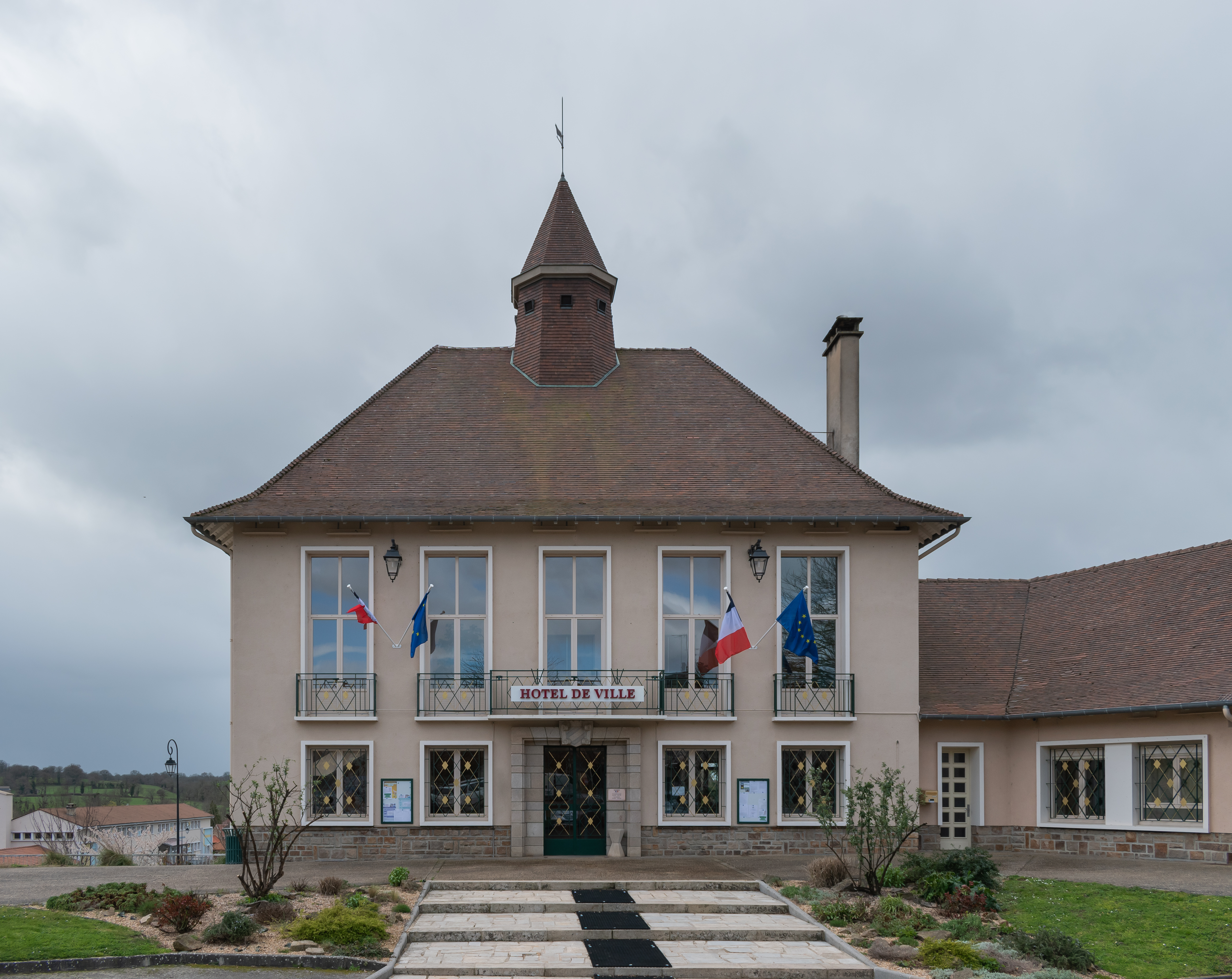
- Town hall of Magnac-Laval

- Coat of arms
- Location of Magnac-Laval
- Location within France Location within Nouvelle-Aquitaine
- Coordinates: 46°12′54″N 1°10′02″E
- Country: France
- Region: Nouvelle-Aquitaine
- Department: Haute-Vienne
- Arrondissement: Bellac
- Canton: Châteauponsac
- Intercommunality: Haut-Limousin en Marche

Government
  - Mayor (2020–2026): Xavier Guibert
- Area^{1}: 72.22 km^{2} (27.88 sq mi)
- Highest elevation: 324 m (1,063 ft)
- Lowest elevation: 189 m (620 ft)
- Population (2023): 1,690
  - Density: 23.4/km^{2} (60.6/sq mi)
- Time zone: UTC+01:00 (CET)
  - Summer (DST): UTC+02:00 (CEST)
- INSEE/Postal code: 87089 /87190
- ^{1} French Land Register data, which excludes lakes, ponds, glaciers > 1 km^{2} (0.386 sq mi or 247 acres) and river estuaries.

Magnac-Laval (French pronunciation: [maɲak laval]; Occitan: Manhac la Vau) is a commune in the Haute-Vienne department in the Nouvelle-Aquitaine region in west-central France.

== Geography ==
The river Brame flows westward through the middle of the commune and crosses the town.

Inhabitants are known as Magnachons.

== See also ==
- Communes of the Haute-Vienne department
