= Saint-Georges-les-Landes =

- Commune
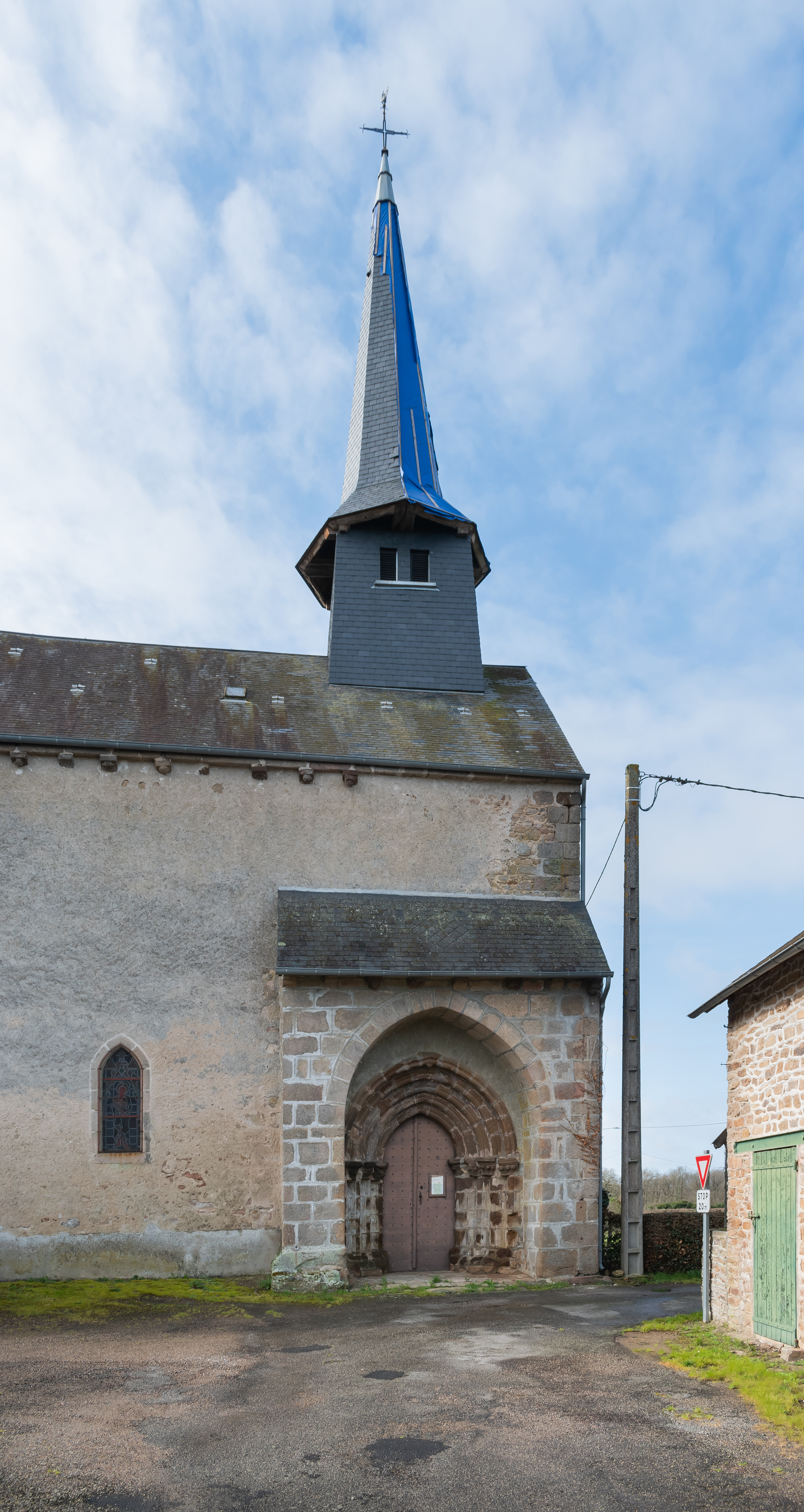
- Saint George church in Saint-Georges-les-Landes

- Coat of arms
- Location of Saint-Georges-les-Landes
- Location within France Location within Nouvelle-Aquitaine
- Coordinates: 46°20′35″N 1°20′15″E
- Country: France
- Region: Nouvelle-Aquitaine
- Department: Haute-Vienne
- Arrondissement: Bellac
- Canton: Châteauponsac

Government
  - Mayor (2020–2026): Joël Lachaise
- Area^{1}: 16.21 km^{2} (6.26 sq mi)
- Highest elevation: 302 m (991 ft)
- Lowest elevation: 218 m (715 ft)
- Population (2023): 232
  - Density: 14.3/km^{2} (37.1/sq mi)
- Time zone: UTC+01:00 (CET)
  - Summer (DST): UTC+02:00 (CEST)
- INSEE/Postal code: 87145 /87160
- ^{1} French Land Register data, which excludes lakes, ponds, glaciers > 1 km^{2} (0.386 sq mi or 247 acres) and river estuaries.

Saint-Georges-les-Landes (French pronunciation: [sɛ̃ ʒɔʁʒ le lɑ̃d]; Occitan: Sent Jòrge las Landes) is a commune in the Haute-Vienne department in the Nouvelle-Aquitaine region in west-central France.

Inhabitants are known as Georgeois.

== See also ==
- Communes of the Haute-Vienne department
