= Châteauponsac =

Châteauponsac Chastel Ponçac (Occitan)
- Commune
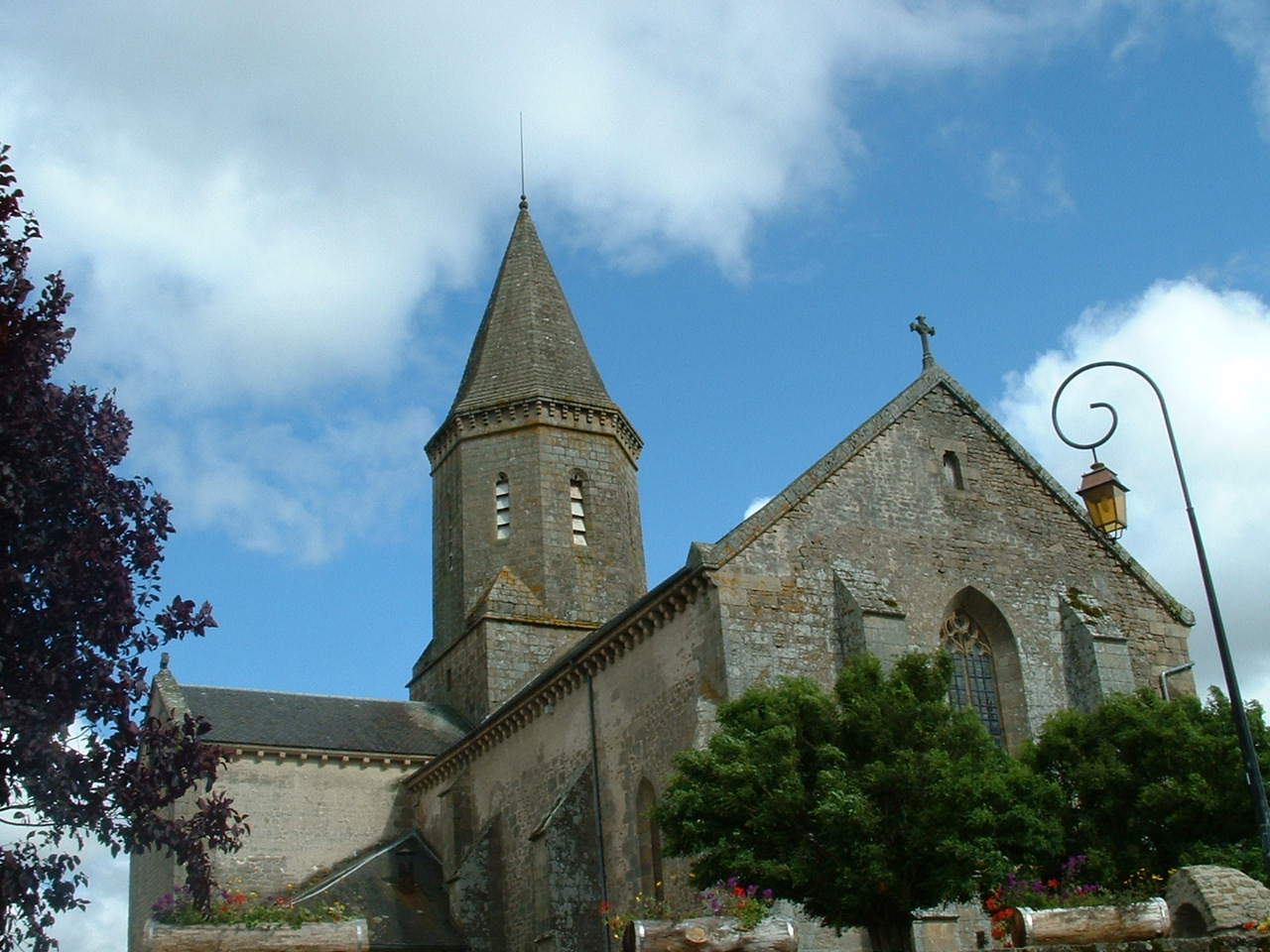
- The church in Châteauponsac

- Coat of arms
- Location of Châteauponsac
- Location within France Location within Nouvelle-Aquitaine
- Coordinates: 46°08′05″N 1°16′37″E
- Country: France
- Region: Nouvelle-Aquitaine
- Department: Haute-Vienne
- Arrondissement: Bellac
- Canton: Châteauponsac
- Intercommunality: Gartempe – Saint Pardoux

Government
  - Mayor (2020–2026): Gérard Rumeau
- Area^{1}: 68.79 km^{2} (26.56 sq mi)
- Elevation: 299 m (981 ft)
- Highest elevation: 471 m (1,545 ft)
- Lowest elevation: 196 m (643 ft)
- Population (2023): 2,034
  - Density: 29.57/km^{2} (76.58/sq mi)
- Time zone: UTC+01:00 (CET)
  - Summer (DST): UTC+02:00 (CEST)
- INSEE/Postal code: 87041 /87290
- ^{1} French Land Register data, which excludes lakes, ponds, glaciers > 1 km^{2} (0.386 sq mi or 247 acres) and river estuaries.

Châteauponsac (French: [ʃɑtopɔ̃sak]; Occitan: Chastel Ponçac), also known locally as Château Lorraine, is a commune in the Haute-Vienne department in the Nouvelle-Aquitaine region in western France.

== Geography ==
The village lies between the river Semme to the north and the Gartempe to the south, both flowing westward. The Gartempe formed a deep valley, passing below the 12th century church.

== Population ==
Historical population
Year	Pop.	±% p.a.
1968	2,885	—
1975	2,849	−0.18%
1982	2,604	−1.28%
1990	2,409	−0.97%
1999	2,252	−0.75%
2007	2,175	−0.43%
2012	2,086	−0.83%
2017	2,035	−0.49%
2023	2,034	−0.01%
Source: INSEE

Inhabitants are known as Châtelots in French.

== Sights ==
Its twelfth-century church is dedicated to Saint Thyrsus.

== Births ==
- Jean Baubérot (born on 26 July 1941), French historian and sociologist

== See also ==
- Communes of the Haute-Vienne department
