= Le Dorat =

- Commune
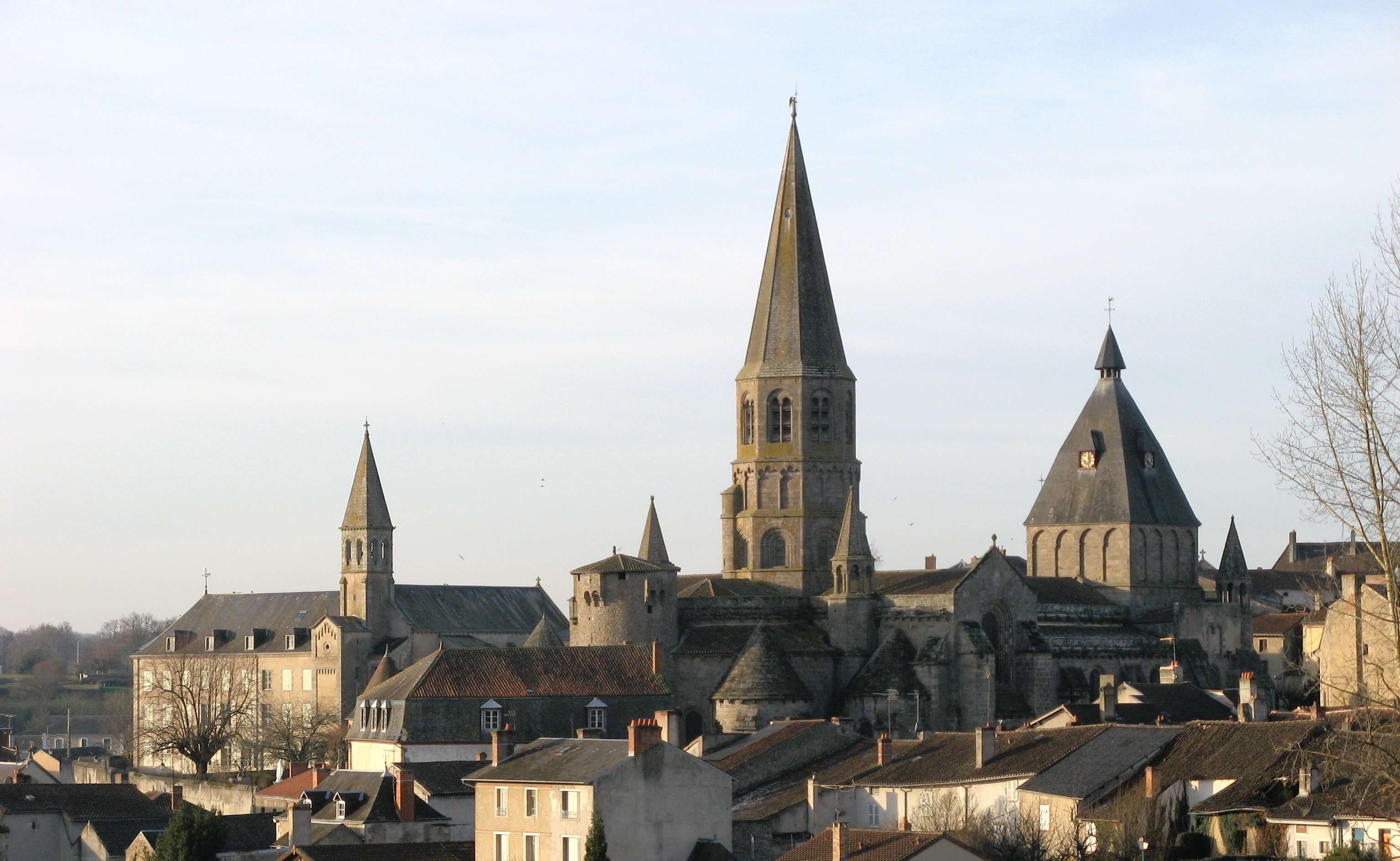
- Collegiate church of Le Dorat

- Coat of arms
- Location of Le Dorat
- Location within France Location within Nouvelle-Aquitaine
- Coordinates: 46°12′58″N 1°04′56″E
- Country: France
- Region: Nouvelle-Aquitaine
- Department: Haute-Vienne
- Arrondissement: Bellac
- Canton: Châteauponsac

Government
  - Mayor (2020–2026): Bruno Schira
- Area^{1}: 23.77 km^{2} (9.18 sq mi)
- Highest elevation: 271 m (889 ft)
- Lowest elevation: 177 m (581 ft)
- Population (2023): 1,529
  - Density: 64.32/km^{2} (166.6/sq mi)
- Time zone: UTC+01:00 (CET)
  - Summer (DST): UTC+02:00 (CEST)
- INSEE/Postal code: 87059 /87210
- ^{1} French Land Register data, which excludes lakes, ponds, glaciers > 1 km^{2} (0.386 sq mi or 247 acres) and river estuaries.

Le Dorat (French pronunciation: [lə dɔʁa]; Occitan: Le Daurat) is a commune in the Haute-Vienne department in the Nouvelle-Aquitaine region in western France. It is considered to be the traditional capital of the Basse Marche. Inhabitants are known as Dorachons. Some say that Le Dorat owes its name to the gilded angel located at the summit of the "Lou Dora" bell tower.

== Geography ==
The town is located 50 km north of Limoges. The river Brame forms part of the commune's northwestern border. There is one SNCF train station on the line Limoges-Poitiers that connects the town to Paris.

== History ==
In the year 950, missionaries reconstructed a church dedicated to Saint Michel. 20 years later, the Saint Pierre chapel and the chapitre du Dorat were founded near the church Saint Michel. During the Medieval period, the Saint Pierre chapel was known for its veneration of King St. Clovis.

Le Dorat was a town of nobility and property owners. In 1356, the town was besieged by the Prince of Wales and during the European wars of religion from 1524 to 1648, the town was badly damaged.

== Sights ==
Le Dorat is an ancient town, with fine examples of Romanesque architecture, especially the 11th Century Collegiate of Saint-Pierre.

== Events ==
Events include horse racing events in June, July and August; a national horse show in September; sound and light show; craft days; Christmas market as well as concerts, tennis, cinema, fishing, sailing and windsurfing. In 2019 le Dorat hosted the World Sheep Shearing Championship.

== See also ==
- Communes of the Haute-Vienne department
