= Dinsac =

- Commune
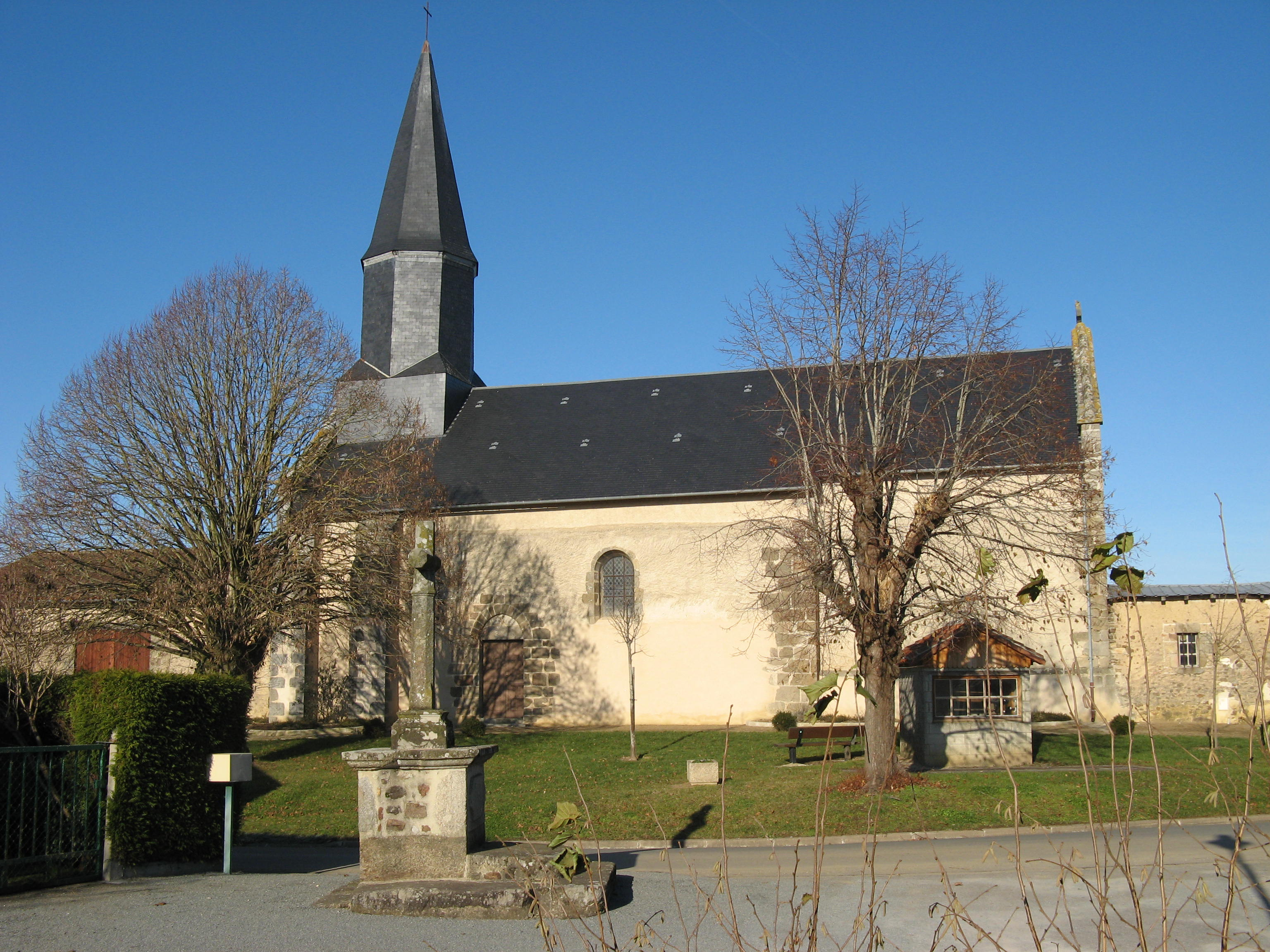
- The church in Dinsac
- Location of Dinsac
- Location within France Location within Nouvelle-Aquitaine
- Coordinates: 46°13′55″N 1°07′06″E
- Country: France
- Region: Nouvelle-Aquitaine
- Department: Haute-Vienne
- Arrondissement: Bellac
- Canton: Châteauponsac

Government
  - Mayor (2020–2026): Lynda Aubrun
- Area^{1}: 19.43 km^{2} (7.50 sq mi)
- Highest elevation: 272 m (892 ft)
- Lowest elevation: 179 m (587 ft)
- Population (2023): 242
  - Density: 12.5/km^{2} (32.3/sq mi)
- Time zone: UTC+01:00 (CET)
  - Summer (DST): UTC+02:00 (CEST)
- INSEE/Postal code: 87056 /87210
- ^{1} French Land Register data, which excludes lakes, ponds, glaciers > 1 km^{2} (0.386 sq mi or 247 acres) and river estuaries.

Dinsac (French pronunciation: [dɛ̃sak]; Occitan: Dinçac) is a commune in the Haute-Vienne department in the Nouvelle-Aquitaine region in western France.

== Geography ==
The river Brame flows northwestward through the commune and forms part of its southeastern and northwestern borders.

Inhabitants are known as Dinsacois.

== See also ==
- Communes of the Haute-Vienne department
