= Saint-Barbant =

- Part of Val-d'Oire-et-Gartempe
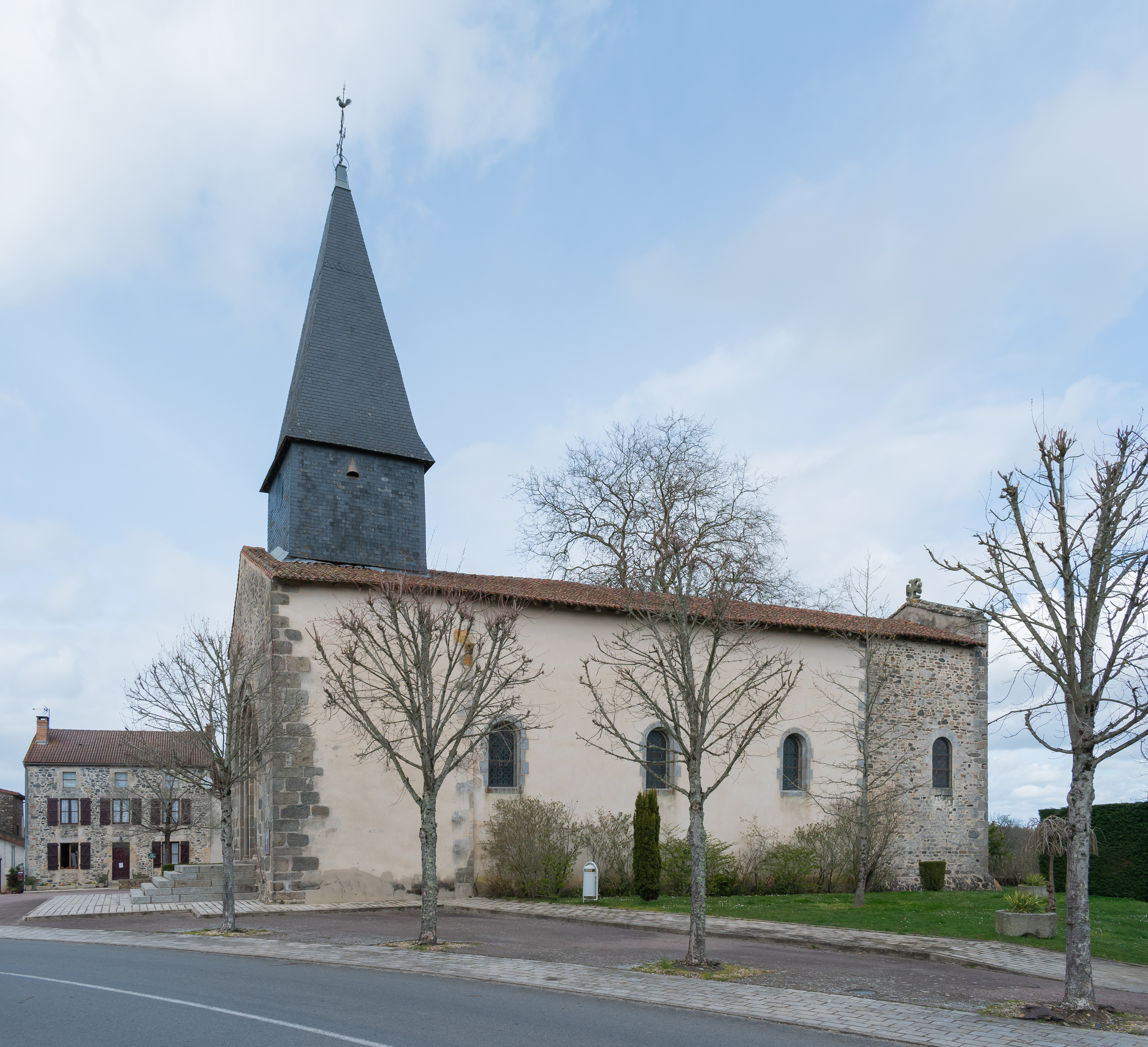
- The church in Saint-Barbant
- Location of Saint-Barbant
- Location within France Location within Nouvelle-Aquitaine
- Coordinates: 46°10′22″N 0°51′01″E
- Country: France
- Region: Nouvelle-Aquitaine
- Department: Haute-Vienne
- Arrondissement: Bellac
- Canton: Bellac
- Commune: Val-d'Oire-et-Gartempe
- Area^{1}: 42.47 km^{2} (16.40 sq mi)
- Highest elevation: 247 m (810 ft)
- Lowest elevation: 144 m (472 ft)
- Population (2022): 336
  - Density: 7.91/km^{2} (20.5/sq mi)
- Time zone: UTC+01:00 (CET)
  - Summer (DST): UTC+02:00 (CEST)
- Postal code: 87330
- ^{1} French Land Register data, which excludes lakes, ponds, glaciers > 1 km^{2} (0.386 sq mi or 247 acres) and river estuaries.

Saint-Barbant (French pronunciation: [sɛ̃ baʁbɑ̃]; Occitan: Sent Barbant) is a former commune in the Haute-Vienne department in the Nouvelle-Aquitaine region in west-central France. On 1 January 2019, it was merged into the new commune Val-d'Oire-et-Gartempe.

Inhabitants are known as Saint-Barbanteaux.

== See also ==
- Communes of the Haute-Vienne department
