= Oradour-Saint-Genest =

- Commune
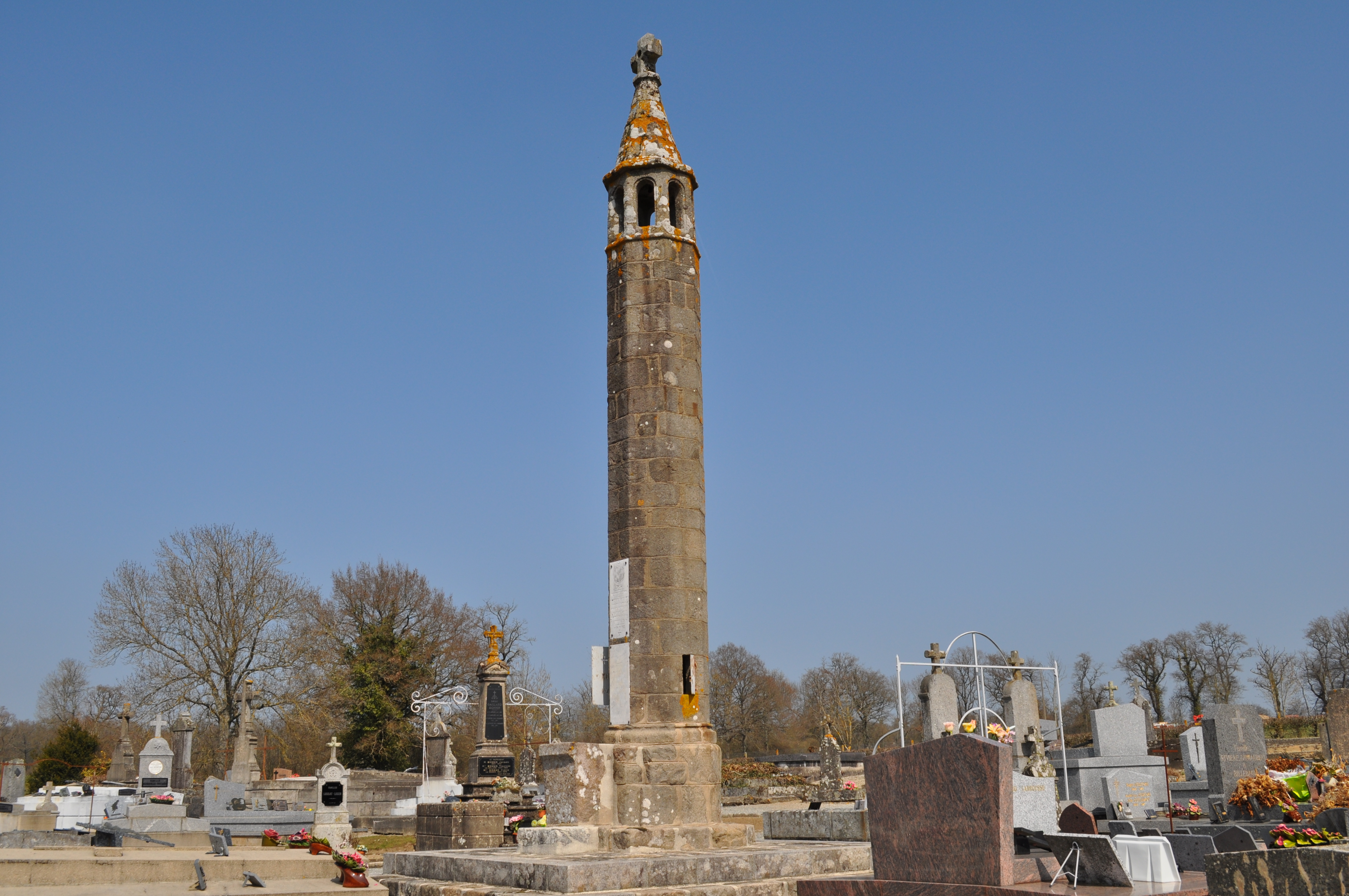
- The lantern of the dead, in Oradour-Saint-Genest
- Location of Oradour-Saint-Genest
- Location within France Location within Nouvelle-Aquitaine
- Coordinates: 46°14′21″N 1°02′09″E
- Country: France
- Region: Nouvelle-Aquitaine
- Department: Haute-Vienne
- Arrondissement: Bellac
- Canton: Châteauponsac

Government
  - Mayor (2020–2026): Gilles Reynaud
- Area^{1}: 37.90 km^{2} (14.63 sq mi)
- Highest elevation: 249 m (817 ft)
- Lowest elevation: 160 m (520 ft)
- Population (2023): 367
  - Density: 9.68/km^{2} (25.1/sq mi)
- Time zone: UTC+01:00 (CET)
  - Summer (DST): UTC+02:00 (CEST)
- INSEE/Postal code: 87109 /87210
- ^{1} French Land Register data, which excludes lakes, ponds, glaciers > 1 km^{2} (0.386 sq mi or 247 acres) and river estuaries.

Oradour-Saint-Genest (French pronunciation: [ɔʁaduʁ sɛ̃ ʒənɛ]; Limousin: Orador Sent Genès) is a commune in the Haute-Vienne department in the Nouvelle-Aquitaine region in west-central France.

== Geography ==
The river Brame flows northwestward through the commune.

== See also ==
- Communes of the Haute-Vienne department
