= Rancon =

- Commune
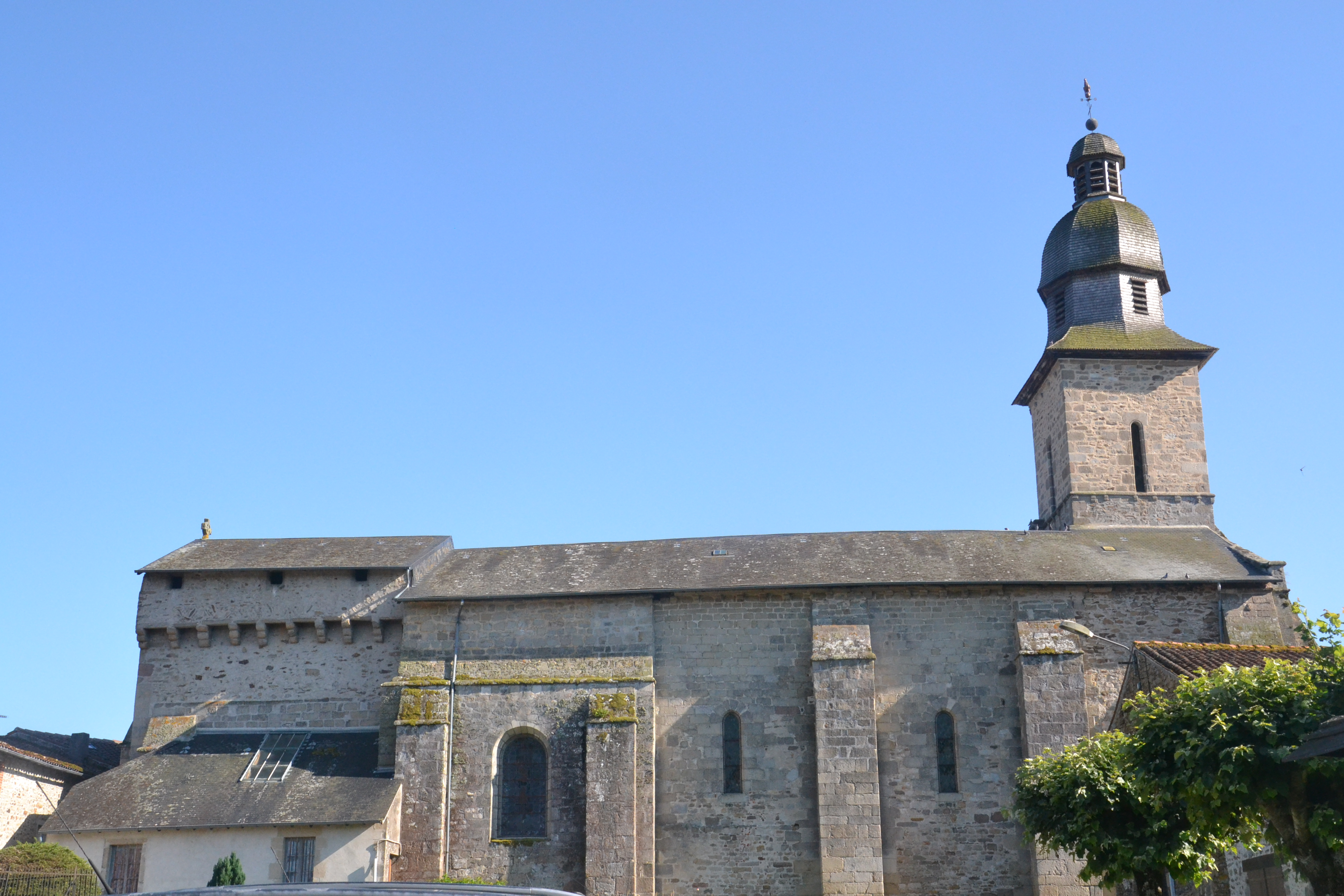
- The church in Rancon

- Coat of arms
- Location of Rancon
- Location within France Location within Nouvelle-Aquitaine
- Coordinates: 46°07′54″N 1°11′02″E
- Country: France
- Region: Nouvelle-Aquitaine
- Department: Haute-Vienne
- Arrondissement: Bellac
- Canton: Châteauponsac
- Intercommunality: Gartempe - Saint Pardoux

Government
  - Mayor (2020–2026): Michel Creyssac
- Area^{1}: 33.31 km^{2} (12.86 sq mi)
- Highest elevation: 337 m (1,106 ft)
- Lowest elevation: 185 m (607 ft)
- Population (2023): 475
  - Density: 14.3/km^{2} (36.9/sq mi)
- Time zone: UTC+01:00 (CET)
  - Summer (DST): UTC+02:00 (CEST)
- INSEE/Postal code: 87121 /87290
- ^{1} French Land Register data, which excludes lakes, ponds, glaciers > 1 km^{2} (0.386 sq mi or 247 acres) and river estuaries.

Rancon (French pronunciation: [ʁɑ̃kɔ̃]; Occitan: Rancom) is a commune in the Haute-Vienne department in the Nouvelle-Aquitaine region in southwestern France.

== History ==
The earliest known name for Rancon is Roncomagus; which comes from the Gallic and means 'market at the rock'. And the piers for the old bridge over the River Gartempe - which still exists - date from the Gallo-Roman era. This bridge is believed to have carried an important Gallo-Roman road.

The village also has a fortified church which featured in the Hundred Years War. As well as a 'Lantern of the dead' dating from the 12th century. The exact purpose of these lanterns is still a mystery.

There is also a Roman-style chapel outside the village, which houses a Gallo-Roman altar dedicated to Hercules. This chapel is open during the summer and was painted by English artists Fred Yates and Geoff Bunn both of whom lived in the area for a time.

== Geography ==
The river Semme forms the commune's northern border.

The river Gartempe forms part of the commune's eastern border, flows westward through the middle of the commune, then forms part of the commune's western border.

Inhabitants are known as Ranconniers.

== See also ==
- Communes of the Haute-Vienne department
