= Peyrabout =

Commune in Nouvelle-Aquitaine, France

- Commune
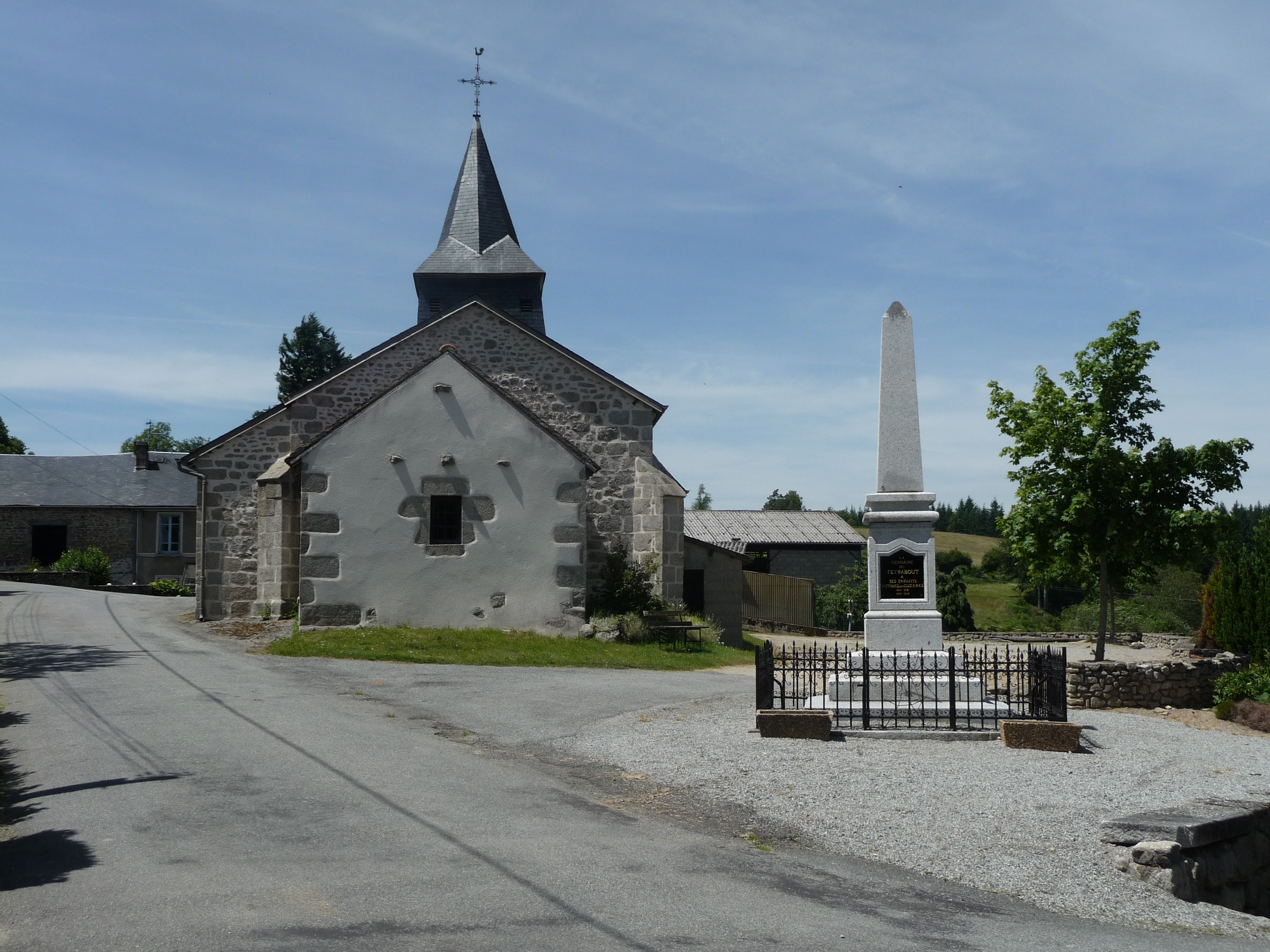
- A view of the church and the war memorial in Peyrabout
- Location of Peyrabout
- Location within France Location within Nouvelle-Aquitaine
- Coordinates: 46°06′29″N 1°54′46″E
- Country: France
- Region: Nouvelle-Aquitaine
- Department: Creuse
- Arrondissement: Guéret
- Canton: Ahun
- Intercommunality: CA Grand Guéret

Government
  - Mayor (2020–2026): Jean-Paul Brignoli
- Area^{1}: 8.91 km^{2} (3.44 sq mi)
- Elevation: 600 m (2,000 ft)
- Highest elevation: 685 m (2,247 ft)
- Lowest elevation: 446 m (1,463 ft)
- Population (2023): 150
  - Density: 17/km^{2} (44/sq mi)
- Time zone: UTC+01:00 (CET)
  - Summer (DST): UTC+02:00 (CEST)
- INSEE/Postal code: 23150 /23000
- ^{1} French Land Register data, which excludes lakes, ponds, glaciers > 1 km^{2} (0.386 sq mi or 247 acres) and river estuaries.

Peyrabout (French pronunciation: [pɛʁabu]; Occitan: Peirabon) is a commune in the Creuse department in the Nouvelle-Aquitaine region in central France.

== Geography ==
A small area of forestry and farming comprising the village and one hamlet situated just 5 miles (8.0 km) south of Guéret, at the junction of the D3 and the D52.

== Population ==
Historical population
Year	Pop.	±% p.a.
1968	111	—
1975	114	+0.38%
1982	171	+5.96%
1990	162	−0.67%
1999	158	−0.28%
2007	140	−1.50%
2012	140	+0.00%
2017	153	+1.79%
2023	150	−0.33%
Source: INSEE

== Sights ==
- The church of St. Madeleine, dating from the twelfth century.

== See also ==
- Communes of the Creuse department
