= Fred Yates =

English painter

- Born: Frederick Joseph Yates; 25 July 1922; Urmston, Lancashire, England
- Died: 7 July 2008 (aged 85); England
- Known for: Painting

Frederick Joseph Yates (25 July 1922 – 7 July 2008) was an English artist. Inspired by the Manchester painter L. S. Lowry, Yates set out to paint pictures about the lives of ordinary people: " ... It is the man in the street that I'm after, whom I feel closest to, with whom I want to make friends and enter into confidence and connivance, and he is the one I want to please and enchant by means of my work". Despite his reclusive nature, his paintings combined sharp observations of people going about their daily lives with strong, impressionist colours and expressive brushwork. His paintings are included in many private and public collections including Brighton and Hove Art Gallery, Liverpool University, the University of Warwick, Torquay Art Gallery and Russell Coates Gallery Bournemouth.

== Biography ==
Fred Yates was born in Urmston, Lancashire, England in 1922. He began his working life as an insurance clerk but this career was cut short by the Second World War, during which he served with the Grenadier Guards. His twin brother was posted missing in action during the failed attempt to capture the bridge at Arnhem during Operation Market Garden in September 1944.

The loss of his brother had a profound effect on Yates and the sense of isolation made him fearful of close relationships throughout his life. Nonetheless, it gave him the resolve to give up insurance work and, against his family's wishes, become an artist. With a serviceman's grant he enrolled on a teacher training course at Bournemouth College of Art where he received a formal education in drawing, printmaking and painting and won a scholarship to Rome. He then taught in Devon and the South Coast for the next 20 years, a profession which brought some security, but which he disliked enormously. His shyness and gentle manner made it impossible to maintain any discipline in the classroom and the only way he could keep control was to embark on painting demonstrations where he could lose himself in his work and try not to notice the pupils behind him. Nonetheless he continued painting in his own right and in 1954 came second to L.S. Lowry for his painting of Brighton and Hove Albion Football Club in a competition organised by the Football Association. The painting is now in the collection of Brighton Museum and Art Gallery. In 1957 his factory scene in oils The East Sussex Engineering Co Ground Floor-Shop was included, and as one of the handful of colour reproductions, as one of the 'Young Artists of Promise' in Jack Beddington's book.

=== Cornwall ===
In 1968 he finally made the decision to quit teaching and become a full-time painter, moving to Cornwall where he could develop his work supplementing his income with gardening work for neighbours. Most of his early work was painted outdoors on rough boards using household paints, but his approachable style and manner earned him some notable early collectors and in 1976 he had his first solo show at the Reynolds Gallery in Plymouth and in the same year was a finalist in the John Moore's Prize. During the 1970s and 80's Yates began to gain wider acceptance and in 1992 had his first London exhibition with Thompson's Gallery.

=== France ===
Yates's solitary nature and fear of emotional entanglements made him a habitual house-mover. In the early 1990s Yates moved to France, first of all to a mill house near Beaume De Venise, then to the village of Rancon in the Haute-Vienne, later back to Sablet in Provence, then Nyons and finally the mountain village of La Motte Chalancon in the Rhône-Alpes. It was during this period that Yates began to produce some of his most daring paintings, often working with huge quantities of paint applied by stick or hands. In his last years he made repeated efforts to return to England, eventually finding a small house in Frome, Somerset. It was on his journey to complete the purchase that he fell and suffered a heart attack. He died in University College Hospital and is buried in Marazion Cornwall.

== Exhibitions ==
Fred Yates's principal representative during his life was John Martin Gallery in London. The gallery held numerous exhibitions of Yates's work including 'Twelve Months in Provence' (2003) 'On Top of the World' (2004) and 'Muck and Brass' (2008). In 2011 Penlee House Art Gallery in Penzance organised an exhibition of his work alongside Bryan Pearce and Joan Gilchrist entitled 'Different Ways of Seeing'.

== Death and memorial ==
Yates died of a heart attack on returning to England in July 2008. The estate was initially administered by John Martin of the John Martin Gallery. With no heirs nor a will, the UK estate is in the care of the Government Legal Department. A Fred Yates Society has been established to assist in preserving and promoting his work. Yates is buried in Marazion graveyard overlooking St Michael's Mount, a subject he painted repeatedly.

== Publications ==
=== Books ===
- Fred Yates, John Martin, Francis Mallet, Fred Yates: C'est votre passion, monsieur! (London, White Lane Press, 2007)
- Escape to Cornwall, John Martin, "Different Ways of Seeing: The Artistic Visions of Joan Gillchrest, Bryan Pearce and Fred Yates", Axten, Janet. Penlee House Gallery. Publisher Sansom and Co (2011), ISBN 1906593922

=== Essays ===
- Fred Yates, Crossing the Tamar, John Martin Gallery
- In His Own Little World, John Martin Gallery
