= Canton of Châteauponsac =

Coordinates: 46.13°N 1.28°E

The canton of Châteauponsac is an administrative division of the Haute-Vienne department, western France. Its borders were modified at the French canton reorganisation which came into effect in March 2015. Its seat is in Châteauponsac.

It consists of the following communes:

1. Arnac-la-Poste
2. Azat-le-Ris
3. Balledent
4. La Bazeuge
5. Châteauponsac
6. La Croix-sur-Gartempe
7. Cromac
8. Dinsac
9. Dompierre-les-Églises
10. Le Dorat
11. Droux
12. Les Grands-Chézeaux
13. Jouac
14. Lussac-les-Églises
15. Magnac-Laval
16. Mailhac-sur-Benaize
17. Oradour-Saint-Genest
18. Rancon
19. Saint-Amand-Magnazeix
20. Saint-Georges-les-Landes
21. Saint-Hilaire-la-Treille
22. Saint-Léger-Magnazeix
23. Saint-Martin-le-Mault
24. Saint-Ouen-sur-Gartempe
25. Saint-Sornin-la-Marche
26. Saint-Sornin-Leulac
27. Saint-Sulpice-les-Feuilles
28. Tersannes
29. Val-d'Oire-et-Gartempe
30. Verneuil-Moustiers
31. Villefavard
