= Gartempe =

River in France

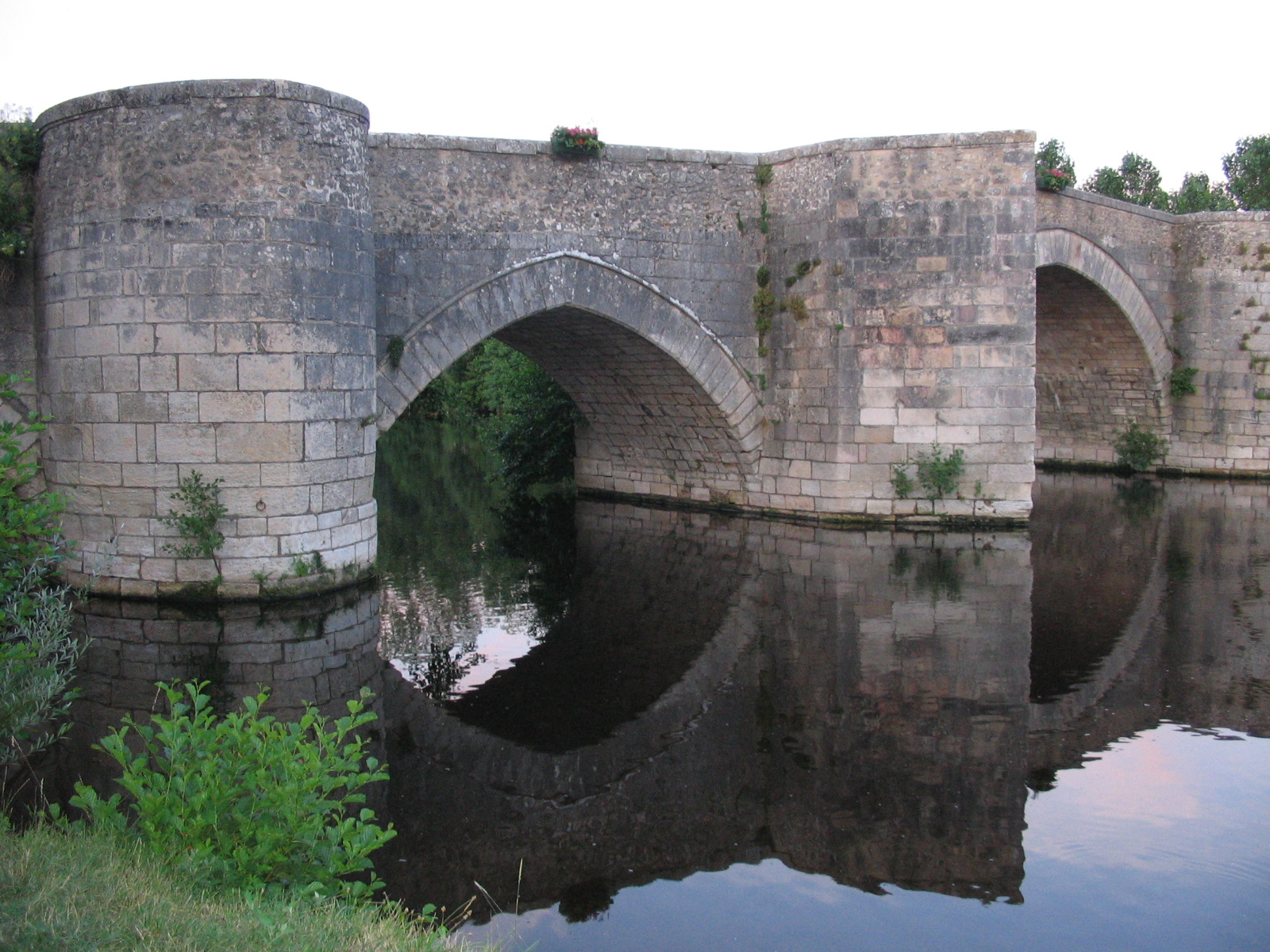
- The Gartempe bridge in Saint-Savin

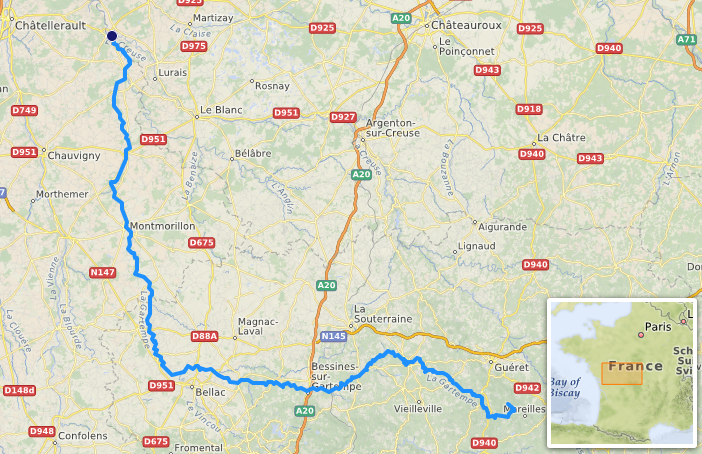

Location
- Country: France
- Regions: Centre-Val de Loire and Nouvelle-Aquitaine

Physical characteristics
- Source
  - location: Limousin
- Mouth
  - location: Creuse
  - coordinates: 46°47′3″N 0°49′48″E
- Length: 205 km (127 mi)
- Basin size: 3,950 km^{2} (1,530 sq mi)

Basin features
- Progression: Creuse→ Vienne→ Loire→ Atlantic Ocean

The Gartempe (French pronunciation: [ɡaʁtɑ̃p]) is a French river, 205 kilometres (127 mi) long. It is a left tributary of the Creuse, which it joins in La Roche-Posay. Its source is in the municipality of Peyrabout.

Among its tributaries are the Anglin, the Brame, the Semme and the Ardour.

The Gartempe flows generally northwest through the following departments and towns:

- Creuse: Peyrabout, Le Grand-Bourg
- Indre: Néons-sur-Creuse
- Indre-et-Loire: Yzeures-sur-Creuse
- Haute-Vienne: Châteauponsac, Rancon
- Vienne: Montmorillon, Saint-Savin, La Roche-Posay
