= House of Rochechouart =

French noble family

- Coat of arms
- Parent house: House of Limoges
- Country: France
- Founded: 980; 1046 years ago
- Founder: Aimery I, Viscount of Rochechouart
- Current head: Aimery, Marquis of Rochechouart; Mortemart branch: Charles-Emmanuel, Duke of Mortemart
- Titles: Marquis of Rochechouart; Prince of Tonnay-Charente; Duke of Mortemart and Vivonne; Grandee of Spain
- Motto: L'Esprit surpasse la Matière (French for 'Mind over matter')
- Estates: Château de Rochechouart; Château de Jumilhac; Hôtel de Rochechouart (formerly)
- Cadet branches: Rochechouart-Mortemart; Rochechouart-Clermont (extinct); Rochechouart-Barbazan (extinct)

The House of Rochechouart (French: [ʁɔʃ(ə)ʃwaʁ]; Maison de Rochechouart) is the oldest noble family in France. This powerful dynasty of the Carolingian era dates back to Foucher, supporter of Charles the Bald, who became viscount (vicomte) of Limoges in 876. His descendants—Limoges, Rochechouart, Mortemart and Brosse—ruled over the area for several centuries, providing many different French regimes with politicians, soldiers, functionaries and other notable figures. The family is named after the town of Rochechouart.

== Origins ==
Foucher de Limoges, the founder of the House of Limoges-Rochechouart, was the second son of Raymond I, Count of Toulouse, and of Berteys, daughter of Rémi. The viscounts of Limoges and of Rochechouart were thus descended from the Counts of Rouergue and probably from the Counts of Autun and from Théodoric, who founded the Autun dynasty c. 730.

== Viscounts of Limoges ==
=== The first viscounts ===
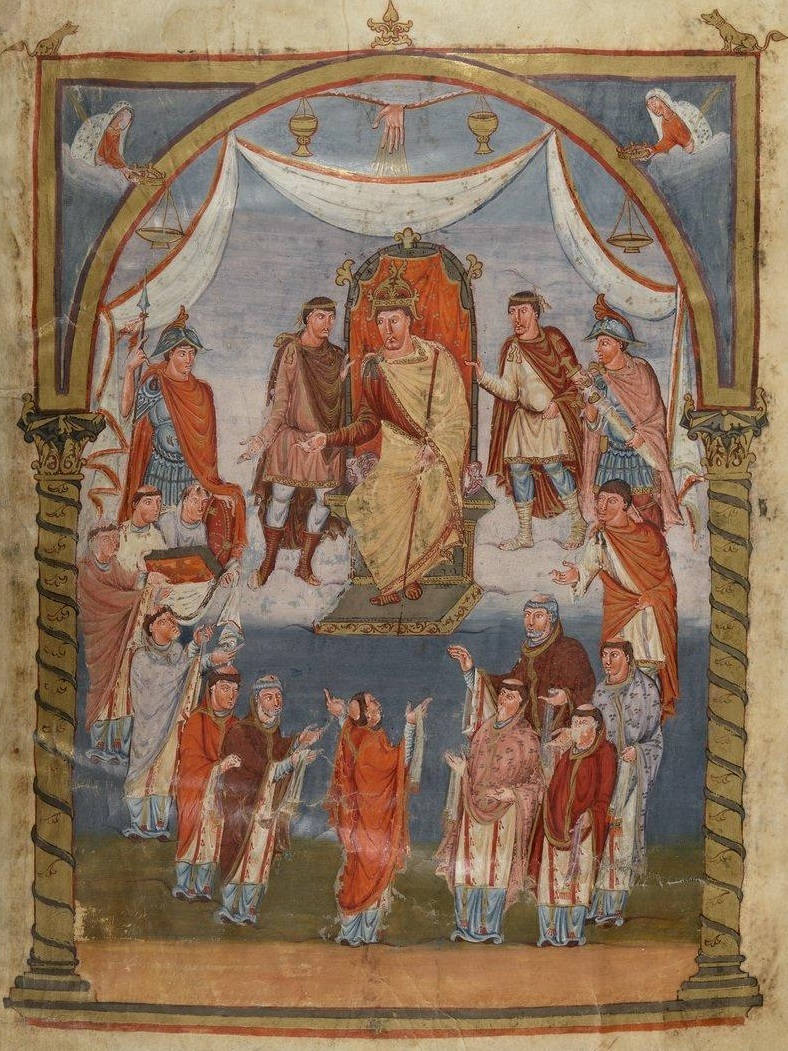
King Charles the Bald receives a delegation of monks

Foucher, supporter of Charles the Bald, was rewarded for his services in the king's wars by being granted the viscountcy of Limoges, which extended into Limousin and Berry. Foucher was crowned as viscount in 876 in Limoges and started minting his own coinage. The promulgation of the Capitulary of Quierzy the following year simultaneously freed the lords up from royal authority and made their titles and charges hereditary, thus giving birth to the French feudal system. Like other lordships, the viscounty of Limoges became an autonomous territory, administered by viscount Foucher. On his death in 886, his son Hildebert became lord of Limoges, followed by Hildebert's son Hildegaire, then Hildebert's grandson Géraud, establishing in a lasting way the dynasty of viscounts in their fiefdom of Limoges.

=== Around 1000 ===
At the end of the first millennium, the lords of Limoges reinforced their authority over the city, which had considerably enlarged itself under the privileges of the cult of Saint Martial. The three great centres of power – the castle, the bishopric, and the abbey – were held onto by Foucher's descendants, and it was under their aegis that the hagiography of the city's patron saint was written. Thus arose the miracle du mal des ardents – in 994, a terrible epidemic transmitted through the rye fell upon the city. The relics of the saint were exposed across the city and the evil ceased. The power of the viscounts, allied as it was to the religious authorities, ended up reinforced. However, at the end of the 11th century, viscount Adémar II (in exchange for a large sum) gave the abbey of Saint-Martial to the Cluniac order despite opposition from its monks, who were driven out. This event marked the beginning of a rivalry between the castle and the town which broke out most markedly in the 1105 fire of Limoges, commanded by viscount Adémar III. Despite everything, the bishop's cause was boosted as a result of the fire, and the viscount was condemned to rebuilding the city.

=== The viscounts of Limoges after Adémar III ===
On his death in 1139, Adémar III had a daughter, Brunissende, but no more male heirs. Therefore, the viscountcy of Limoges passed to Guy de Comborn, Adémar's son-in-law, though Foucher's line continued via the viscounts of Rochechouart. Until 1290, the viscountcy of Limoges was held by the house of Comborn, then passed to the House of Dreux-Bretagne (1290–1384), to the House of Blois-Châtillon (1384–1481), and finally to the House of Albret (1484–1572). On the death of Jeanne d'Albret, viscountess of Limoges, in 1572, the title descended upon Henri III of Navarre, the future Henry IV. In 1607, the viscountcy was once and for all reassigned to the Crown. Nevertheless, in 1661, Louis XIV authorised count François de Rochechouart to take the arms and title of the counts of Limoges, as a descendant in the direct and male line from Foucher of Limoges. Since that date, the title of count of Limoges has fallen upon the 'chef d'armes' (inheritor) of the House of Rochechouart.

== The House of Rochechouart ==
=== First viscounts and the Crusades ===
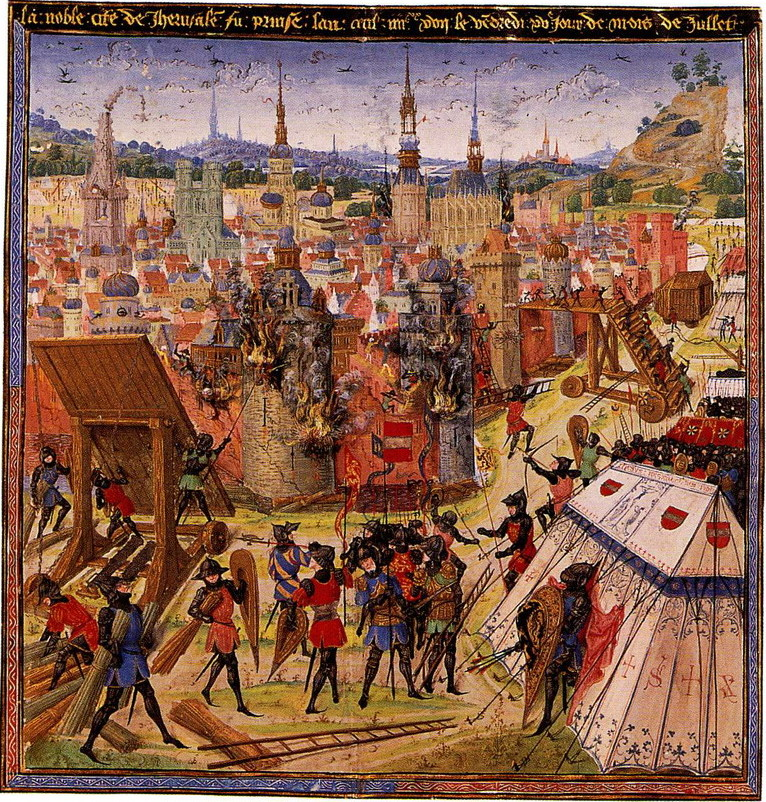
The Capture of Jerusalem in 1099 during the First Crusade

In 980, Aimery de Limoges, fourth son of viscount Géraud, married Eve, daughter of Guillaume II, count of Angoulême. Her dowry included the lands of Rochechouart and so Aimery became Aimery I, viscount of Rochechouart. He ruled for more than half a century over this fiefdom and his son, Aimery II, succeeded him on his death in 1036, only to be assassinated in 1049 by an enemy in unclear circumstances. Aimery II was succeeded by his son Aimery III, then by his grandson Aimery IV. Aimery IV participated in the First Crusade and at the capture of Jerusalem in 1099 beside Godfrey of Bouillon. His son Aimery V imitated him, accompanying King Louis VII on the Second Crusade.

=== The legend of Alix and the lion ===
Aimery VI succeeded his father around 1170. He fortified the city of Rochechouart and founded a castle there, of which the keep survives today. His son, Aimery VII, who succeeded him in 1230, was (with his wife Alix) the protagonist in an adventure known as "Alix and the lion", reported by abbot Duléry. Alix was an exceptionally beautiful and virtuous wife and, when the castle's intendant conceived a violent passion for her, she rebuffed his advances. To avenge himself, he pretended to swap roles with the viscount and, enraged at this, Aimery shut Alix in prison with a lion. A few days later, he went to check on her and found Alix alive and the lion sleeping by her side. Aimery needed no more convincing of his wife's innocence and so shut up the intendant with the starving lion instead, who instantly devoured the attendant.

=== A democracy ahead of its time ===
At the end of the 13th century, Aimery XI renounced a large part of his privileges in promulgating a charter of enfranchisement which transformed Rochechouart into a democratic city, and turned its inhabitants from serfs into citizens. The city was from then on governed by four consuls who chose their own successors, without their lord's intervention. At the same time the viscount suppressed all direct taxes such as the taille and the quête and abolished duties of service to the feudal lord. He also accorded the inhabitants of Rochechouart the essential conditions for total liberty — they could dispose of their goods, buy or sell, import and export whatever they wanted, build, move about freely within the viscountcy, all without intervention from their lord. The Charter of Aimery XI was very advanced for its times, and — despite pressure from the other lords in the region, who considered Aimery a dangerous revolutionary — it remained in force until 1789.

=== The Hundred Years' War ===
The repudiation of Eleanor of Aquitaine by Louis VII, and her remarriage in 1153 to Henry II of England began a period of three centuries of Anglo-French wars in south-west France, during which the Rochechouarts paid a heavy price. Despite continual threats from English troops, the viscounts of Rochechouart remained loyal to the king of France. Aimery VI paid homage in 1226 to the young Louis IX on his accession to the throne. Aimery IX accompanied Philip III to the Ost de Foix in 1271 and on the Aragon expedition in 1283. Viscount Simon fought in 1304 on the side of Philip IV, playing a major part in the French victory in Flanders. His son Jean, who married a descendant of Louis IX, imitated Simon in 1328 on the expedition sent into Flanders by Philip VI.

The family's devotion to the French crown left Rochechouart itself dangerously exposed throughout the Hundred Years' War. Viscount Jean fought at the battle of Crécy in 1346, surviving its decimation of the French nobility. In the wake of this defeat, the English king's captain Henry of Lancaster used his troops to devastate Poitou and its environs. Rochechouart resisted him for several days before falling to him, and the city was sacked and occupied in 12 days, with 600 people killed. Ten years later, in 1356, Jean was killed in the carnage of the battle of Poitiers whilst interposing himself to save the life of John II. The following year the Treaty of Brétigny granted Poitou and Limousin to the crown of England. Rochechouart was thus delivered up to the English in 1362. Nevertheless, Jean's son Louis refused to submit to the troops of Edward III and the Black Prince and was imprisoned by the latter in 1364. When he was freed, he rushed to the court of Charles V to renew his allegiance and rejoin Bertrand du Guesclin's troops. Reprisals for this came swiftly, with English troops allied to local French lords unsuccessfully laying siege to Rochechouart, recaptured several times by the viscounts. The town and castle's fortifications remained unbroken, but the surrounding lands were pillaged and devastated. The French king himself sympathised and granted the viscount the châtellenie of Rochefort. Louis de Rochechouart, councillor and chamberlain of Charles V, and his lieutenant in Limousin, fought on Du Guesclin's side in the reconquest of Poitou in 1372–1373.

=== On the way to the throne ===
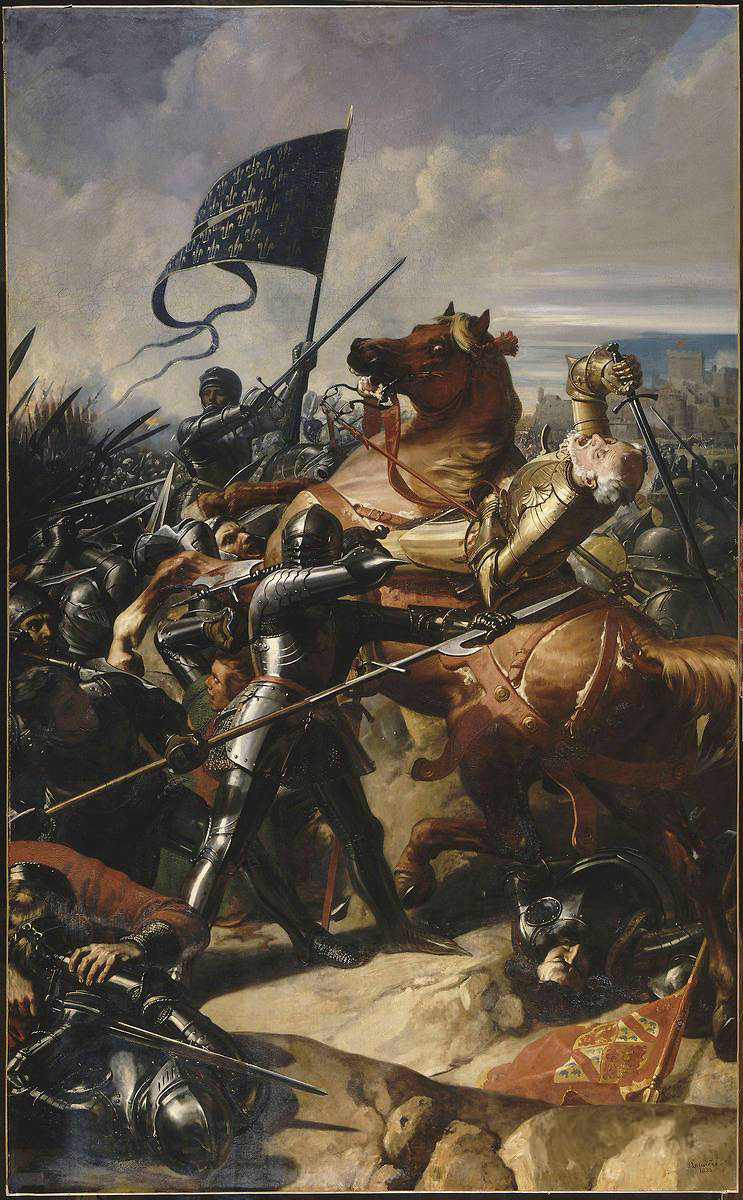
The Battle of Castillon by Charles-Philippe Larivière

The conduct of viscounts Simon, Jean and Louis during the Hundred Years' War allowed the Rochechouart family to attain the highest reaches of the 15th-century French feudal hierarchy. Viscount Louis, who died in 1394, was involved in the campaigns that returned the French kings to the throne of France, and was called cousin by the king. The three viscounts who succeeded him — Jean II, Geoffroy and Foucaud — were councillors and chamberlain to Charles VI, Charles VII, and Louis XI. By their marriages, they expanded their territories, receiving the fiefdoms of Berry and Poitou. Jean II married Eléonore de Mathefelon, whose mother was of the sang royal. Within the king's armies, the viscounts were chevaliers bannerets, at the head of important troops of knights, horsemen and men at arms. Supporters of the crown of France during the civil war which marked the reign of Charles VI, they participated in the great battles of the Hundred Years' War during that century — Agincourt and the campaigns of Joan of Arc, to whom Geoffroi was a companion. Geoffroi's son Foucaud was named governor of La Rochelle and the Aunis region, a post of capital importance whilst the expulsion of the English continued in Guyenne. Made a knight of the Order of the Porcupine, a chivalric order of only 24 members instituted by Charles d'Orléans, he participated in 1453 at the capture of Bordeaux and the Battle of Castillon which marked the French monarchy's reconquest of south-western France and the definitive victory of France over England in the Hundred Years' War.

=== The affair of the cut-off hand ===
Foucaud only had one child by his marriage, his daughter Anne. Despite the viscount's reluctance, in 1470 she married Jean de Pontville, chamberlain of Charles de France, duke of Guyenne and brother of Louis XI. The marriage served the political interests of the king of France and his brother (who hated each other) and so they put strong pressure on Foucaud to accept the marriage. Thus, as the viscountcy of Limoges had done 300 years earlier, the viscountcy of Rochechouart left the line of Foucher of Limoges, although this was continued by the lords of Bourdet and lords of Le Chandenier, two branches via cousins.

Jean and Anne of Pontville had one son, François, who became famous for an affair that was widely trumpeted during the era. In 1513, when François de Pontville had set out to take part in a hunt, a friend of his, Bermondet de Cromières, came to visit him at the château de Rochechouart. Well known for his beautiful hands, Bermondet was received by the countess but, after waiting for François for a long time, he returned home. On François's return, the viscountess informed him of Bermondet's visit, all the while praising his elegant manners and beautiful hands. François was jealous and impulsive in character, and so set out immediately with some men in pursuit of his friend. Bermondet came out to greet François and his knights but, in François's sight, the knights fell on Bermondet and killed him with blows from their poignards. François then got off his horse, cut off one of his victim's hands, put it in a box and returned to the castle, covered in blood and dust, to offer it to his wife with the retort "Madame, here is the object of your idolatry. It's the beautiful hand of the Marquis of Cromières!" The Parlement of Paris took up the matter, condemning François de Pontville and his accomplices to death.

=== The affair of the chevalier de Jars ===
After Foucaud, the Rochechouarts continued to serve the crown of France, notably during the Italian Wars of the 16th century. In 1508 viscount François was made governor of Gênes by Francis I. Viscount François's son Christophe was taken prisoner with the king at the Battle of Pavia in 1525. In 1530, their cousin Antoine was a commander at the defence of Marseille against Charles V — he was killed at the Battle of Cérisoles in 1544. René fought on the Duke of Guise's side in the re-capture of England's last continental possession, Calais, in 1558 and received the collar of the Order of the Holy Spirit in 1580. Jean-Louis participated in the 1627 Siege of La Rochelle under the command of Cardinal Richelieu.

Jean-Louis's nephew François, also called the chevalier de Jars, was admitted to the inner circle of Anne of Austria, making him suspect in the Cardinal's eyes. After the Day of the Dupes, François was forced into exile in England, before being recalled to the French court in 1631, where he participated in intrigues. Imprisoned in the Bastille in 1632, he was interrogated more than 80 times by Isaac de Laffemas, the Bourreau du cardinal, who could not get a single confession out of him. Laffemas condemned him to death nevertheless and conducted him to the scaffold himself. However, at the very moment François de Rochechouart was placing his head on the block, a messenger came to stop the execution. After remaining in prison a long time after this, he was released and exiled to Italy, where he became close to Cardinal Mazarin. He played an important role in the first hours of the Fronde.

=== At the Court of the Sun King ===
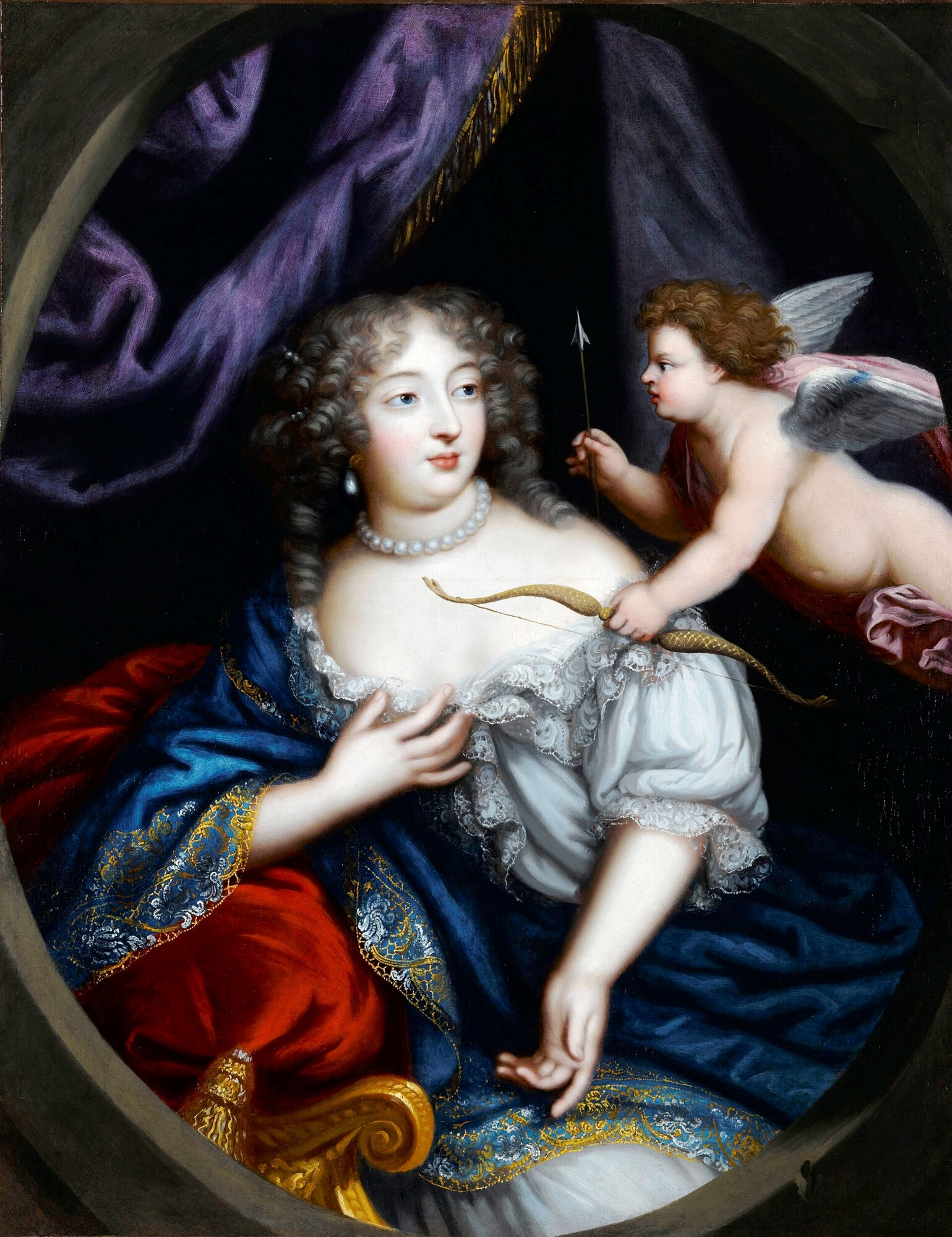
Madame de Montespan

A childhood friend of Louis XIII, Gabriel de Rochechouart de Mortemart (1600–1675) accompanied the king on several expeditions. He was made first gentleman of the royal bedchamber (premier gentilhomme de la chambre du roi) in 1630. Louis XIV elevated him in 1663 to the title of Duke of Mortemart, Prince of Tonnay-Charente and Peer of France, also making him governor of Paris and the Île de France in 1669.

Three of his children occupied the highest places at the court of the Sun King - Louis Victor (1636–1688), called Duc de Vivonne, was Marshal of France and viceroy in Sicily; Marie Madeleine (1645–1704), called the queen of abbesses, was a very influential figure in the 17th century intellectual community, translating Plato's Symposium in conjunction with Racine; Françoise-Athénaïs (1640–1705), known as Madame de Montespan, was Louis XIV's favourite from 1667 to 1680. Under the Marquise's influence, infatuated with luxury, magnificence and "bel esprit", that the king led a majestic reign. They had seven children together, whom the king wished to succeed to the throne if his legitimate line should die out (his great-grandson, the future Louis XV, was then his sole heir). In his will, the king designated the Duke of Maine and the Count of Toulouse as regents over his young successor. After the Sun King's death, Montespan's sons were nevertheless separated by the Duke of Orléans, who had married one of the seven, Françoise-Marie, the great-grandmother of King Louis Philippe I.

In the 18th century, the House of Rochechouart occupied a top-rank place at court. Until the French Revolution, it provided eight generals for the French army, of which one, Jean-Louis, was called to become a Marshal just before his sudden death in 1777. Three were decorated with the Order of the Holy Spirit. The Cardinal de Rochechouart, bishop of Laon, was the second ecclesiastical peer in France, and a very influential figure at the Vatican. Great almoner of the queen, he assisted in 1775 at the coronation of Louis XVI as a peer of the kingdom.

=== 1792 to present ===
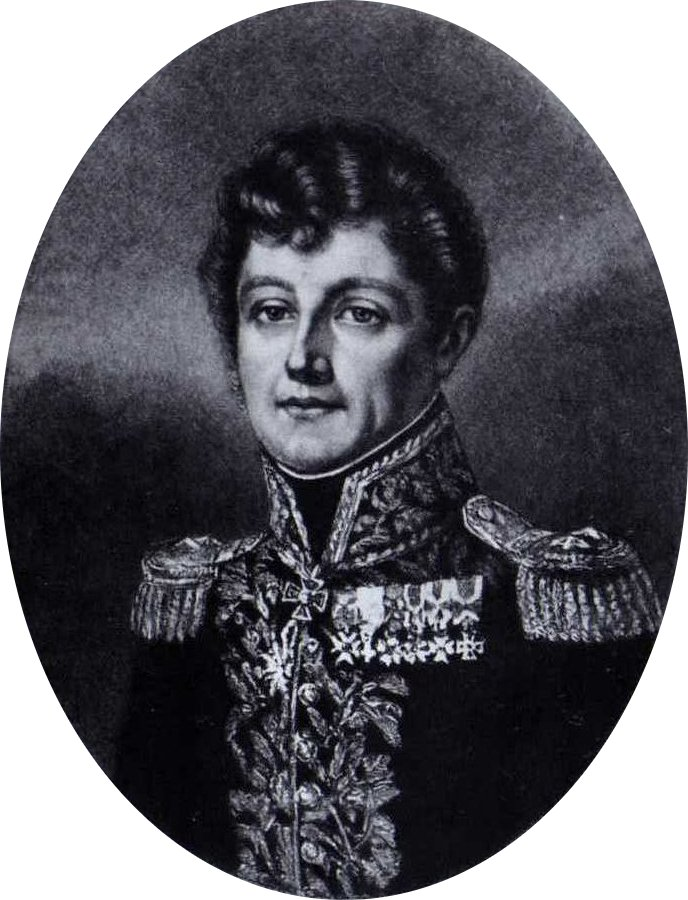
General Louis-Victor-Léon de Rochechouart

The family's privileged position at the court of the kings of France placed it in a delicate situation after the Revolution. In 1789, General Aimery Louis-Roger de Rochechouart was elected to the Estates General. A liberal, he was one of the seven deputies of the nobility to pronounce the merging of the three orders and to rally them at the National Assembly, but the turn of events during the Revolution still forced him to emigrate in 1791, dying a short time later. His sister Diane was guillotined in 1794 during the Reign of Terror, as was her husband the duke of Châtelet, another deputy. Viscountess Marie was also decapitated in April of the same year, and viscountess Elisabeth (friend of Marie-Antoinette) only just escaped such a fate. An arrest warrant was issued on Elisabeth after she helped the queen to evade arrest, shut in the Conciergerie, but Elisabeth escaped to England and Germany, where she was an active counter-revolutionary.

General Victurnien, deputy of the nobility at the Estates General in 1789, also emigrated to England in the face of the revolutionary turmoil, where King George III put him in command of an émigré regiment on the British side, the "régiment Mortemart", which fought in Guernsey and Portugal. He returned to France in 1802. Napoleon named him councillor-general of the Seine in 1812. His son Casimir was employed in the Grande Armée, participating in the battles of Friedland, Essling, Wagram and Borodino. During the Russian campaign, he found himself fighting his own cousin, Louis-Victor-Léon de Rochechouart, who had emigrated to Russia and been made major-general in the tsar's army, fighting at that rank in the battles of Berezina, Dresden, Leipzig, the Campaign in France and the Battle of Paris. Made a general upon the Restoration of Louis XVIII, as well as a commander of the Légion d'honneur, he served as governor of Paris from 1815 to 1823. As for Casimir de Rochechouart de Mortemart, who was also made a general on the Restoration, he was decorated with the Order of the Holy Spirit in 1825. In 1830, Charles X named him prime-minister, but he had no time to govern thanks to the July Revolution which overthrew the monarchy. Made grand-cross of the légion d'Honneur, he was made a senator in 1852. His cousins René-Roger and Henri were deputies under the French Third Republic. Anne de Rochechouart de Mortemart (1847–1933), duchess of Uzès, held one of the biggest fortunes in Europe, spending a large part of it on financing general Boulanger's political career in 1890. A great lady of the world, she wrote a dozen novels and was the first French woman to possess a driving licence. François de Rochechouart de Mortemart, Prince de Tonnay-Charente, was killed in 1918 at Ligny during the First World War.

== Heraldic arms ==
=== Arms and blazon ===
- Limoges: Or, three lions rampant azure, with gules claws
- Rochechouart: Six fesses ondé and enté in argent and in gules, entées from one to the other
- Rochechouart-Limoges: Quarterly, first and fourth: Or three lion cubs azure (from the Limoges side); second and third: six fesses ondé and enté in argent and in gules in six pieces (from the Rochechouart side)

Supporters: Two griffins, or, with claws, gules.
Crest: Head of a unicorn "issante", confronted and posed between two enscrolled armorial banners of Limoges and of Rochechouart
Escutcheon: Surmounted by a ducal crown with an argent "timbre" treillissé and enriched in or, formed of the same crown; at its sides, two banners of Limoges and of England crossed saltaire fashion and linked at the base by a scroll on which is inscribed the motto Ante Mare Undae or L'esprit surpasse la matière.
Livery: yellow, tabard, culotte, scarlet doublet and hose; armorial buttons and braids in argent.
Battle cry: Saint-Martial

=== Mottos ===
- L'esprit surpasse la matière ("Mind over matter")
- Ante mare undae ("Before the sea, were the waters")
- Avant que la mer fût au monde, Rochechouart portait les ondes ("Before God made the sea to roll, Rochechouart bore waves on his scroll")

== Titles of the House of Rochechouart ==
The members of the house of Rochechouart held 16 honours at court:

- Viscount of Rochechouart (980, the oldest title in France)
- Marquis of Montpipeau, by letters patent of Louis XIII
- Duc of Mortemart, by letters patent of Louis XIV (1650)
- Prince of Tonnay-Charente, by an accord of king Louis XIV
- Comte of Limoges, by an accord of king Louis XIV (1661)
- Duc of Vivonne, by letters patent of Louis XIV (1668) in favour of Louis Victor de Rochechouart de Mortemart
- Grand d'Espagne, 1st class (1701)
- Duke of Rochechouart, par lettres patentes de 1753
- Peer of France, by the ordinance of 4 June 1814, confirmed as a hereditary title in the ordinance of 17 August 1815
- Marquis–Hereditary peer by the ordinance of 31 August 1817

== Distinctions ==
The House of Rochechouart has given its name to a quartier, a boulevard, a street, a metro station, and a hôtel particulier in Paris. It has also given birth to

- Statesmen - 1 prime minister, 2 ministers, 6 deputies and senators, numerous chamberlains of the king
- Soldiers - 1 Marshal of France and 13 generals. 23 Rochechouarts have been killed on the field of battle fighting in the French army
- Churchmen and women - 2 cardinals and 10 bishops
- Writers, artists and intellectuals
- 5 members of the Légion d'honneur, including 1 Grand-Croix, and 8 members of the Order of the Holy Spirit.

== Fiefdoms and châteaux ==
- Historic lands possessed by the descendants of Foucher de Limoges:

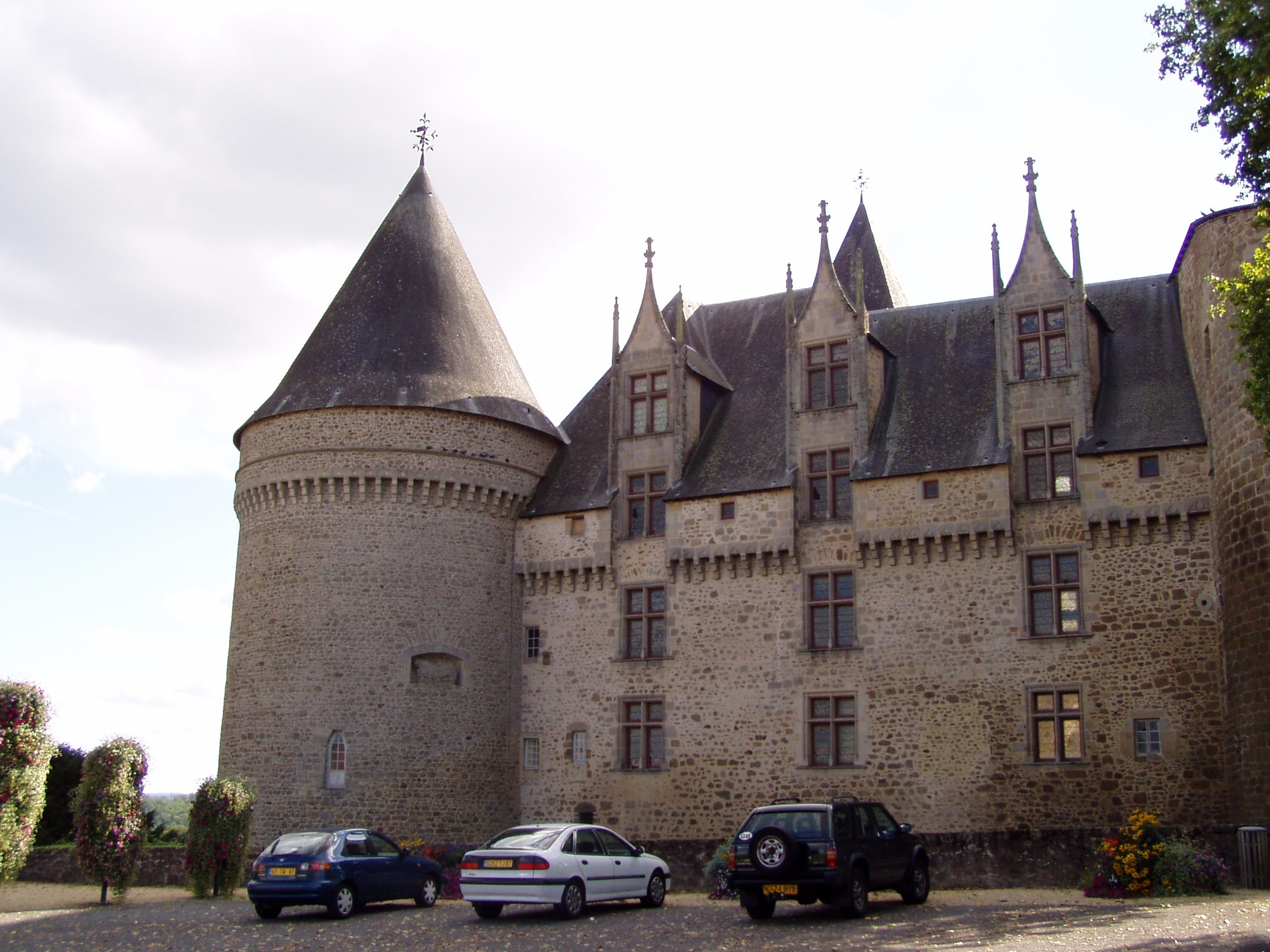
The Château de Rochechouart

Haute-Vienne: Limoges, Rochechouart, Aixe-sur-Vienne, Bâtiment, Berneuil, Blond, Bonat, Boisseuil, Brigueil, Bussière-Boffy, Bussière-Galant, Châlus, Champagnac-la-Rivière, Champsac, Château-Chervix, Chéronnac, Cieux, Clavieres, Cognac-la-Forêt, Coussac-Bonneval, Cussac, Dournazac, Eyjeaux, Fauvette, Flavignac, Glandon, Gorre, Javerdat, La Chapelle-Montbrandeix, Ladignac-le-Long, Lavignac, Le Chalard, Les Cars, Les Salles-Lavauguyon, Maisonnais-sur-Tardoire, Marafy, Maisonnais-sur-Tardoire, Marval, Mézières-sur-Issoire, Mortemart, Nouic, Oradour-sur-Glane, Oradour-sur-Vayres, Pageas, Pensol, Pierre-Buffière, Razé, Repaire, Rochebrune, Saint-Auvent, Saint-Bazile, Saint-Bonnet-Briance, Saint-Christophe, Saint-Gervais, Saint-Genest-sur-Roselle, Saint-Hilaire-Bonneval, Saint-Jean-Ligoure, Saint-Cyr, Saint-Laurent-sur-Gorre, Saint-Léger-la-Montagne, Saint-Mathieu, Saint-Paul, Saint-Victurnien, Saint-Yrieix-la-Perche, Sainte-Marie-de-Vaux, Vayres, Videix, Vigneau...; Aisne: Corbeny, La Ferté-Chevresis, Saint-Germain-les-Belles...; Allier: Bellenaves, Gayette...; Ariège: Lescure, Soulan...; Aube: Bréviandes, La Motte-Tilly, Maupas...; Charente: Bessac, Brigueil, Chabanais, Confolens, Montmoreau-Saint-Cybard, Montrollet, Saint-Christophe...; Charente-Maritime: Fontaine de Burlé, Tonnay-Charente...Cher: Ardé, Chârost, Cros, Fontmoreau, Ivoy-le-Pré, Jars, La Salle de Jançai, Lavaupot, Loisière, Mondon, Morogues, Rhodes, Sens-Beaujeu...; Corrèze: Arnac-Pompadour, Ayen, Benayes, Beyssac, Beyssenac, Brignac-la-Plaine, Chamberet, Louignac, Lubersac, Masseret, Montgibaud, Objat, Perpezac-le-Blanc, Saint-Aulaire, Saint-Cyprien, Saint-Éloy-les-Tuileries, Saint-Julien-le-Vendômois, Saint-Martin-Sepert, Saint-Pardoux-Corbier, Saint-Robert, Saint-Sornin-Lavolps, Segonzac, Ségur-le-Château, Vars-sur-Roseix, Yssandon...; Côte d'Or: Arconçay, Arc-sur-Tille, Brognon, Chazeuil, Dussac, Marey, Selongey; Creuse: Azat-Châtenet, Boussac, Bridiers, Saint-Étienne-de-Fursac...; Dordogne: Abjat-sur-Bandiat, Angoisse, Anlhiac, Atur, Augignac, Bassillac, Beauregard-de-Terrasson, Blis-et-Born, Boulazac, Châtres, Chavagnac, Clermont-d'Excideuil, Coly, Condat-sur-Vézère, Connezac, Corgnac-sur-l'Isle, Excideuil, Eyliac, Eyzerac, Fougeyrolles, Génis, Grèzes, Hautefaye, Javerlhac, La Cosière en Périgord, La Douze, La Bachellerie, La Cassagne, La Dornac, La Feuillade, Lanouaille, Le Bourdeix, Le Lardin-Saint-Lazare, Lempzours, Lussas-et-Nontronneau, Marsaneix, Milhac-d'Auberoche, Nanthiat, Nantheuil, Nontron, Notre-Dame-de-Sanilhac, Payzac, Pazayac, Peyrignac, Preyssac-d'Excideuil, Saint-Antoine-d'Auberoche, Saint-Crépin-d'Auberoche, Saint-Cyr-les-Champagnes, Saint-Estèphe, Saint-Front-sur-Nizonne, Saint-Germain-des-Prés, Saint-Geyrac, Saint-Jean-de-Côle, Saint-Jory-las-Bloux, Saint-Laurent-sur-Manoire, Sainte-Marie-de-Chignac, Saint-Martial-d'Albarède, Saint-Martial-de-Valette, Saint-Martin-de-Fressengeas, Saint-Martin-le-Pin, Saint-Médard-d'Excideuil, Saint-Mesmin, Saint-Pantaly-d'Excideuil, Saint-Pierre-de-Chignac, Saint-Pierre-de-Côle, Saint-Rabier, Saint-Raphaël, Saint-Romain-et-Saint-Clément, Saint-Sulpice-d'Excideuil, Sainte-Trie, Salagnac, Sarlande, Sarrazac, Savignac-Lédrier, Sceau-Saint-Angel, Terrasson-Lavilledieu, Teyjat, Thiviers, Vaunac, Vieux-Mareuil, Villac...; Essonne: Saint-Cyr-la-Rivière...; Haute-Garonne: Aureville, Barbazan, Clermont-le-Fort, Goyrans, Laborthe-sur-Lèze, Montclar-Lauragais, Pompiac...; Gers: Montégut, Plieux...; Gironde: Belin...; Loire-Atlantique: Château-Thébaud, Fercé, Saint-Julien-de-Concelles, Montrelais, Quehillac, La Sénéchallière, Vieillevigne...; Loiret: Châtillon-le-Roi, Coulmiers, Germigny-des-Prés, Isy, La Brosse, Loury, Mareau-aux-Prés, Nancray-sur-Rimarde, Montpipeau, Saint-Ay...; Indre: Chaillac, Saint-Benoît-du-Sault Le Bouchet, Migné, Saulnay...; Lot: Gramat...; Mayenne: Entramme...; Nièvre: Dampierre-sous-Bouhy, Corbigny, Moulins-Engilbert, Saint-Amand-en-Puisaye, Saint-Péreuse, Saint-Vérain, Vauchisson...; Oise: Blicourt, Marseille-en-Beauvaisis...; Puy de Dôme: Artonne, Bessac, La Tour-d'Auvergne, Montpeyroux, Ravel...; Saône et Loire: Bellevesvre, Couches, Layé... Seine-Maritime: [Fricourt], la Motte, ...;Seine-et-Marne: Bray-sur-Seine, Everly, Moigneville, Soissy sous Etiole, Trilbardou, Meaux...; Somme: Marseilles, ...; Tarn-et-Garonne: Bruniquel, Faudoas...; Deux-Sèvres: Champdeniers, Gascougnolles, Le Bourdet, Limalonges, Mauzé, Vouillé...; Vendée: Montaigu...; Vienne: Abzac, Availles, Brion, Chanail, Château-Larcher, Cercigné, Isle-Dieu, Dieuné, Lussac-les-Châteaux, Isle-Jourdain, Vienne, Vernières Vivonne...; Yonne: Malvoisine...; Val d'Oise: Chars...

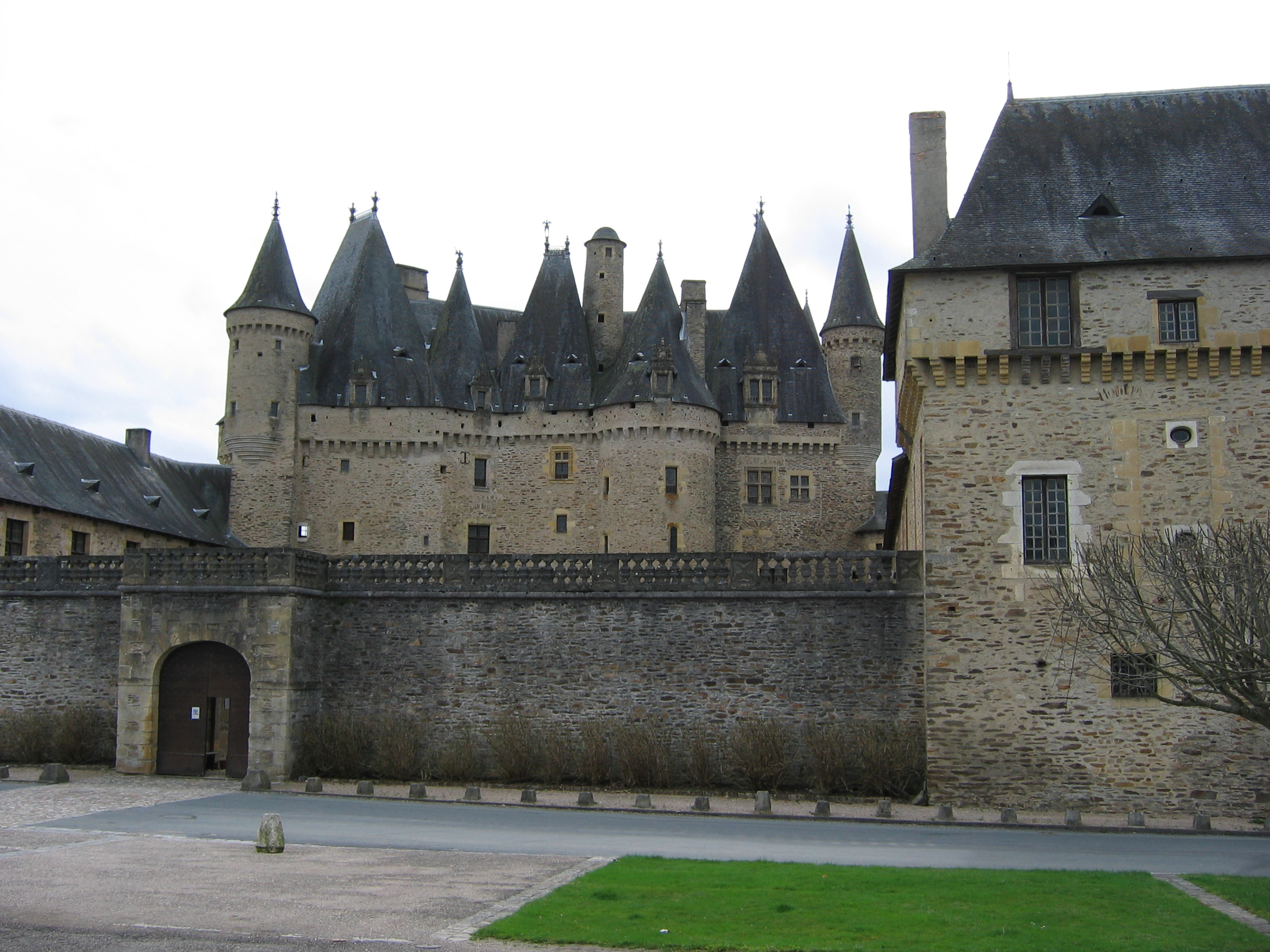
The Château de Jumilhac

- The House of Limoges-Rochechouart also possessed the châteaux of Rochechouart, de Jumilhac, de Montbrun, de Château-Chervix, de Châlus, de Javarzay, d'Auberoche, de La Motte de Bauçay, de Cressey, de Montigny, du Plessis-Belin,..., as well as several hôtels in Paris, including 2 at Saint-Germain des Prés, called the "Colombier", the Hôtel de Rochechouart rue de Grenelle (now used by the Ministère de l'Éducation nationale), the hôtel de Mortemart rue Saint-Guillaume, the hôtel de Jars, and hôtel rue Van Dyck, in Parc Monceau.

== Alliances ==
The House of Rochechouart has notably been allied to the houses of:

- France
- Bourbon
- Navarre
- Orléans
- Vendôme
- Ponthieu
- Vermandois
- England
- Aragon
- Foix
- Courtenay
- Brabant
- Bretagne
- Artois
- Lorraine
- Milan
- Plantagenet
- Dreux-Bretagne
- Angoulême
- Harcourt
- Constant Rebecque
- La Rochefoucauld
- Rougé
- Châtillon
- Mercastel
- Montmorency
- Clermont-Tonnerre
- Polignac
- Albret
- Richelieu
- Noailles
- Colbert
- of Allonville
- Ségur
- La Tour du Pin
- Sully
- Cossé-Brissac
- Turenne
- Anjou-Mézières
- Aumont
- Des Cars
- Damas
- Saint-Aldegonde
- Aubusson
- Beauvilliers
- Beauvau
- Biron
- Chabot
- Estampes
- Montboissier-Canillac
- Montbron
- Pierrebuffières
- Périgord
- Lévis
- La Trémouille
- Saulx
- Borghese

== Simplified genealogy of the House of Limoges ==
Foucher de Limoges (†886) Vicomte de Limoges
Hildebert de Limoges († 914); Vicomte de Limoges
Hildegaire de Limoges († 943); Vicomte de Limoges
Géraud de Limoges († 988); Vicomte de Limoges
Guy I de Limoges († 1025); Vicomte de Limoges	Hildegaire († 990); Bishop of Limoges	Alduin († 1014); Bishop of Limoges	Aimery I de Rochechouart; Ostofrancus; Vicomte de Rochechouart
Adémar I de Limoges († 1025); Vicomte de Limoges	Aimery II de Rochechouart; Vicomte de Rochechouart
Guy II de Limoges († 1067); Vicomte de Limoges	Aimery III de Rochechouart; Vicomte de Rochechouart
Adémar II de Limoges († 1090); Vicomte de Limoges	Aimery IV de Rochechouart; Vicomte de Rochechouart
Adémar III de Limoges († 1139); Vicomte de Limoges	Aimery V de Rochechouart († 1170); Vicomte de Rochechouart
Guy III de Limoges († 1114); Vicomte de Limoges	Aimery VI de Rochechouart († 1230); Vicomte de Rochechouart
Aimery VII de Rochechouart (1180-1243); Vicomte de Rochechouart
Aimery VIII de Rochechouart (1206-1245); Vicomte de Rochechouart
Aimery IX de Rochechouart († 1288); Vicomte de Rochechouart	Guillaume de Mortemart († 1272); Seigneur de Mortemart
Rochechouart branch Eldest branch of the house (surviving to this day)	Mortemart branch (surviving to this day)

== See also ==
- Dukes of Mortemart
- Viscounts of Limoges
- Viscounts of Rochechouart

== Sources ==
All in French unless otherwise noted.

- Michel de Castelnau, Mémoires, 1659
- Père Anselme, Histoire de la Maison royale de France et des grands officiers de la couronne, 1685
- Bonaventure de Saint-Aimable, Histoire de Saint-Martial, 1685
- Charles Clémencet, L'Art de vérifier les dates, 1750
- Louis Moréri, Grand dictionnaire historique, 1759
- Collection Chérin, Bibliothèque Nationale de France
- Ambroise Louis d'Hozier, Carrés d'Hozier, 1851
- Abbé Duléry, Rochechouart, histoire, légendes, archéologie, 1855
- Général Louis-Victor-Léon de Rochechouart, Histoire de la Maison de Rochechouart, 1859
- Ambroise Ledru, La Maison de Faudoas, 1862
- Robert de Lasteyrie, Etude sur les comtes et vicomte de Limoges antéieurs à l'An Mil, 1874
- Léo Desaivres, Histoire des Chandeniers, 1898
- Docteur Adrien Grézillier, Histoire de Rochechouart, des origines à la Révolution, 1975
- Georges Martin, Histoire et généalogie de la Maison de Rochechouart, 1990
