= Vayres =

Vayres is the name or part of the name of the following communes in France:

- Vayres, Gironde, in the Gironde department
- Vayres, Haute-Vienne in the Haute-Vienne department
- Vayres-sur-Essonne, in the Essonne department
