= Arrondissement of Rochechouart =

Coordinates: 45.82°N 0.82°E

Rochechouart
- Arrondissement
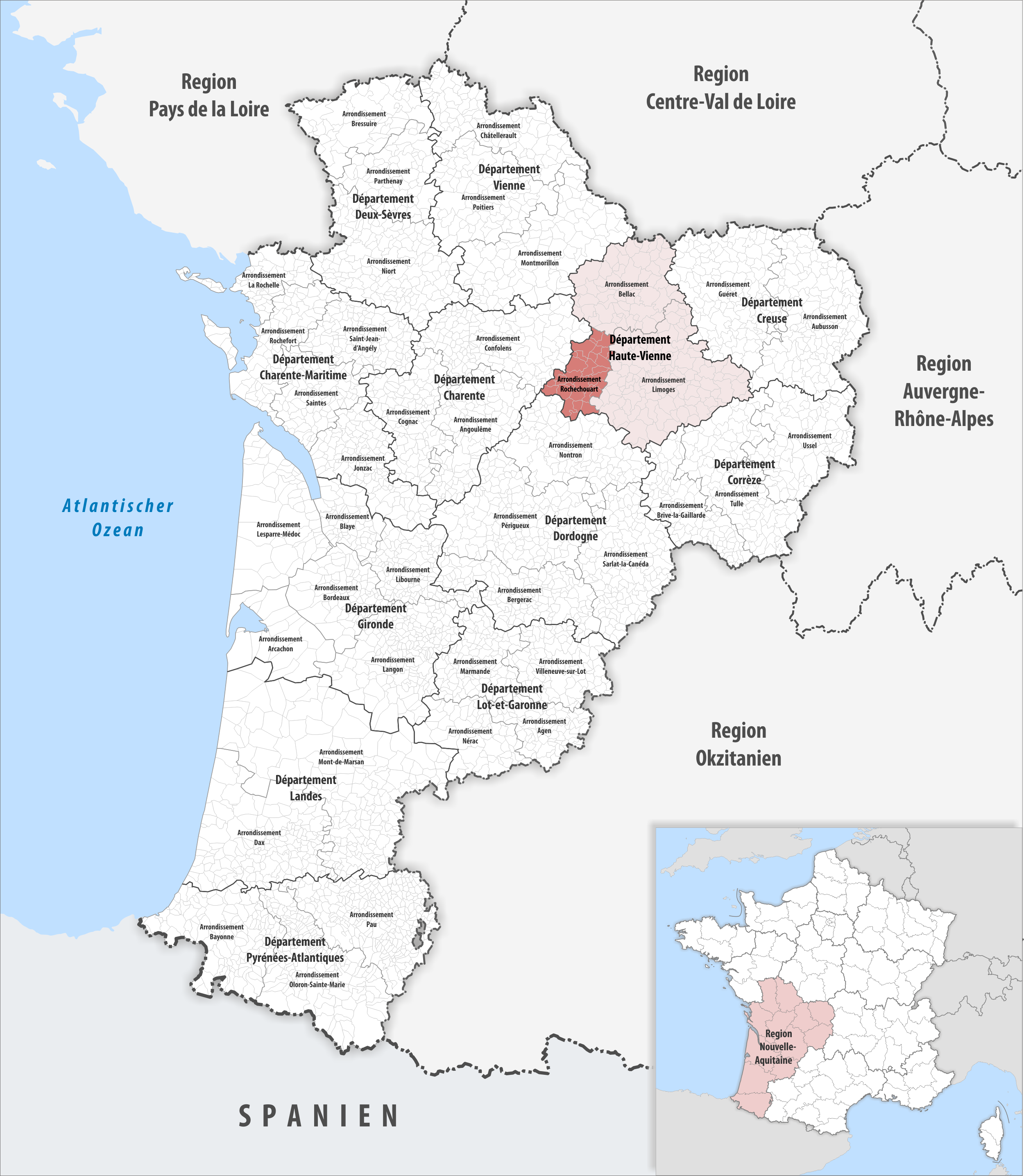
- Location within the region Nouvelle-Aquitaine
- Country: France
- Region: Nouvelle-Aquitaine
- Department: Haute-Vienne
- No. of communes: {{{nbcomm}}}
- Area: 795.4 km^{2} (307.1 sq mi)
- Population (2023): 37,883
  - Density: 47.63/km^{2} (123.4/sq mi)
- INSEE code: 873

The arrondissement of Rochechouart is an arrondissement of France in the Haute-Vienne department in the Nouvelle-Aquitaine region. It has 30 communes. Its population is 37,689 (2021), and its area is 795.4 km^{2} (307.1 sq mi).

== Composition ==
The communes of the arrondissement of Rochechouart, and their INSEE codes, are:

1. Chaillac-sur-Vienne (87030)
2. Champagnac-la-Rivière (87034)
3. Champsac (87036)
4. Chéronnac (87044)
5. Cognac-la-Forêt (87046)
6. Cussac (87054)
7. Dournazac (87060)
8. Gorre (87073)
9. Javerdat (87078)
10. La Chapelle-Montbrandeix (87037)
11. Les Salles-Lavauguyon (87189)
12. Maisonnais-sur-Tardoire (87091)
13. Marval (87092)
14. Oradour-sur-Glane (87110)
15. Oradour-sur-Vayres (87111)
16. Pensol (87115)
17. Rochechouart (87126)
18. Saillat-sur-Vienne (87131)
19. Saint-Auvent (87135)
20. Saint-Bazile (87137)
21. Saint-Brice-sur-Vienne (87140)
22. Saint-Cyr (87141)
23. Sainte-Marie-de-Vaux (87162)
24. Saint-Junien (87154)
25. Saint-Laurent-sur-Gorre (87158)
26. Saint-Martin-de-Jussac (87164)
27. Saint-Mathieu (87168)
28. Saint-Victurnien (87185)
29. Vayres (87199)
30. Videix (87204)

== History ==
The arrondissement of Rochechouart was created in 1800.

As a result of the reorganisation of the cantons of France which came into effect in 2015, the borders of the cantons are no longer related to the borders of the arrondissements. The cantons of the arrondissement of Rochechouart were, as of January 2015:

1. Oradour-sur-Vayres
2. Rochechouart
3. Saint-Junien-Est
4. Saint-Junien-Ouest
5. Saint-Laurent-sur-Gorre
6. Saint-Mathieu
