= Maisonnais-sur-Tardoire =

- Commune
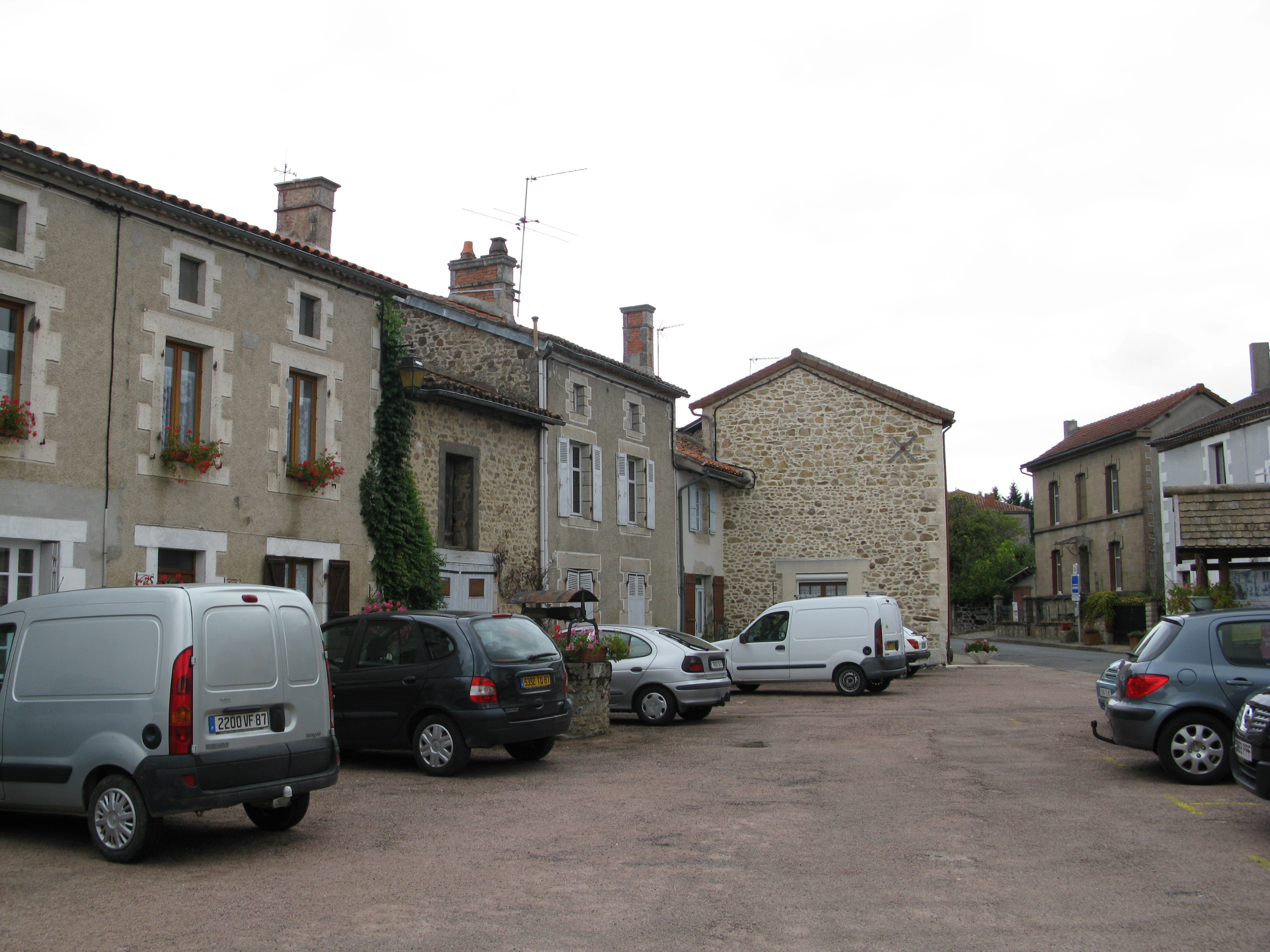
- The main square in Maisonnais-sur-Tardoire

- Coat of arms
- Location of Maisonnais-sur-Tardoire
- Location within France Location within Nouvelle-Aquitaine
- Coordinates: 45°42′47″N 0°41′26″E
- Country: France
- Region: Nouvelle-Aquitaine
- Department: Haute-Vienne
- Arrondissement: Rochechouart
- Canton: Rochechouart

Government
  - Mayor (2020–2026): Raoul Rechignac
- Area^{1}: 31.89 km^{2} (12.31 sq mi)
- Highest elevation: 306 m (1,004 ft)
- Lowest elevation: 165 m (541 ft)
- Population (2023): 383
  - Density: 12.0/km^{2} (31.1/sq mi)
- Time zone: UTC+01:00 (CET)
  - Summer (DST): UTC+02:00 (CEST)
- INSEE/Postal code: 87091 /87440
- ^{1} French Land Register data, which excludes lakes, ponds, glaciers > 1 km^{2} (0.386 sq mi or 247 acres) and river estuaries.

Maisonnais-sur-Tardoire (French pronunciation: [mɛzɔnɛ syʁ taʁdwaʁ], literally Maisonnais on Tardoire; Occitan: Maisonès) is a commune in the Haute-Vienne department in the Nouvelle-Aquitaine region in west-central France.

== Tourism ==
It is a pretty little village with a sixteenth-century church that has a square steeple. It also has a village shop, a school, a town hall, a small post office and a cemetery.

It is 6 kilometres from the nearest small town, Saint-Mathieu which has a variety of shops and bars and a tennis court, as well as a swimming lake.

It is central to three capital cities, Angoulème the capital of the Charente, with its famous cartoon museum; Limoges the capital of the Limousin, famous for its history of porcelain manufacture and Périgueux the capital of the Périgord.

== See also ==
- Communes of the Haute-Vienne department
