= Saint-Auvent =

- Commune
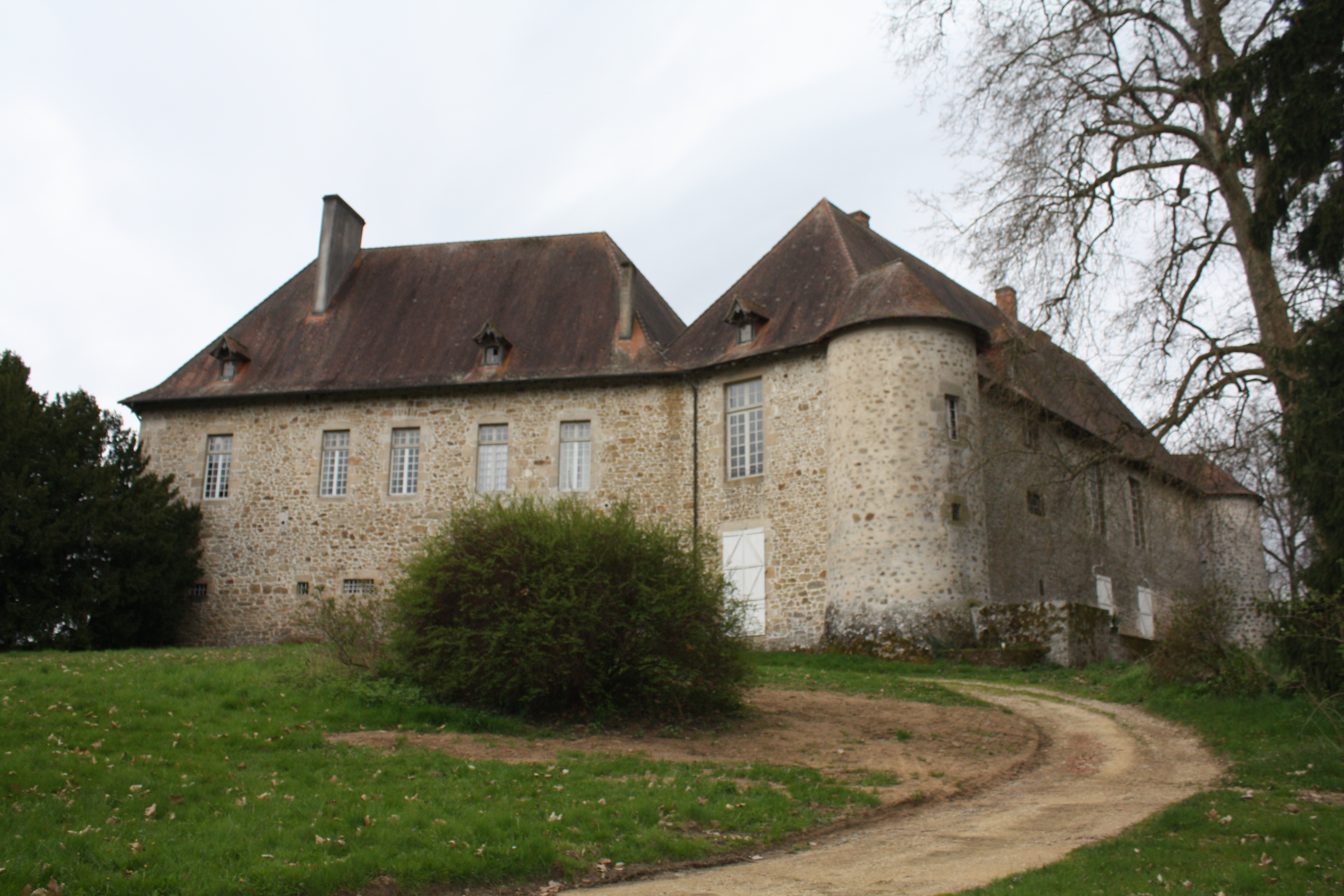
- The Chateau of Saint-Auvent

- Coat of arms
- Location of Saint-Auvent
- Location within France Location within Nouvelle-Aquitaine
- Coordinates: 45°48′23″N 0°55′57″E
- Country: France
- Region: Nouvelle-Aquitaine
- Department: Haute-Vienne
- Arrondissement: Rochechouart
- Canton: Rochechouart

Government
  - Mayor (2020–2026): Bruno Grancoing
- Area^{1}: 33.46 km^{2} (12.92 sq mi)
- Highest elevation: 348 m (1,142 ft)
- Lowest elevation: 194 m (636 ft)
- Population (2023): 974
  - Density: 29.1/km^{2} (75.4/sq mi)
- Time zone: UTC+01:00 (CET)
  - Summer (DST): UTC+02:00 (CEST)
- INSEE/Postal code: 87135 /87310
- ^{1} French Land Register data, which excludes lakes, ponds, glaciers > 1 km^{2} (0.386 sq mi or 247 acres) and river estuaries.

Saint-Auvent (French pronunciation: [sɛ̃.t‿ovɑ̃]; Occitan: Sent Auvenç) is a commune in the Haute-Vienne department in the Nouvelle-Aquitaine region in west-central France.

Inhabitants are known as Auventais.

== See also ==
- Communes of the Haute-Vienne department
