= Cognac-la-Forêt =

- Commune
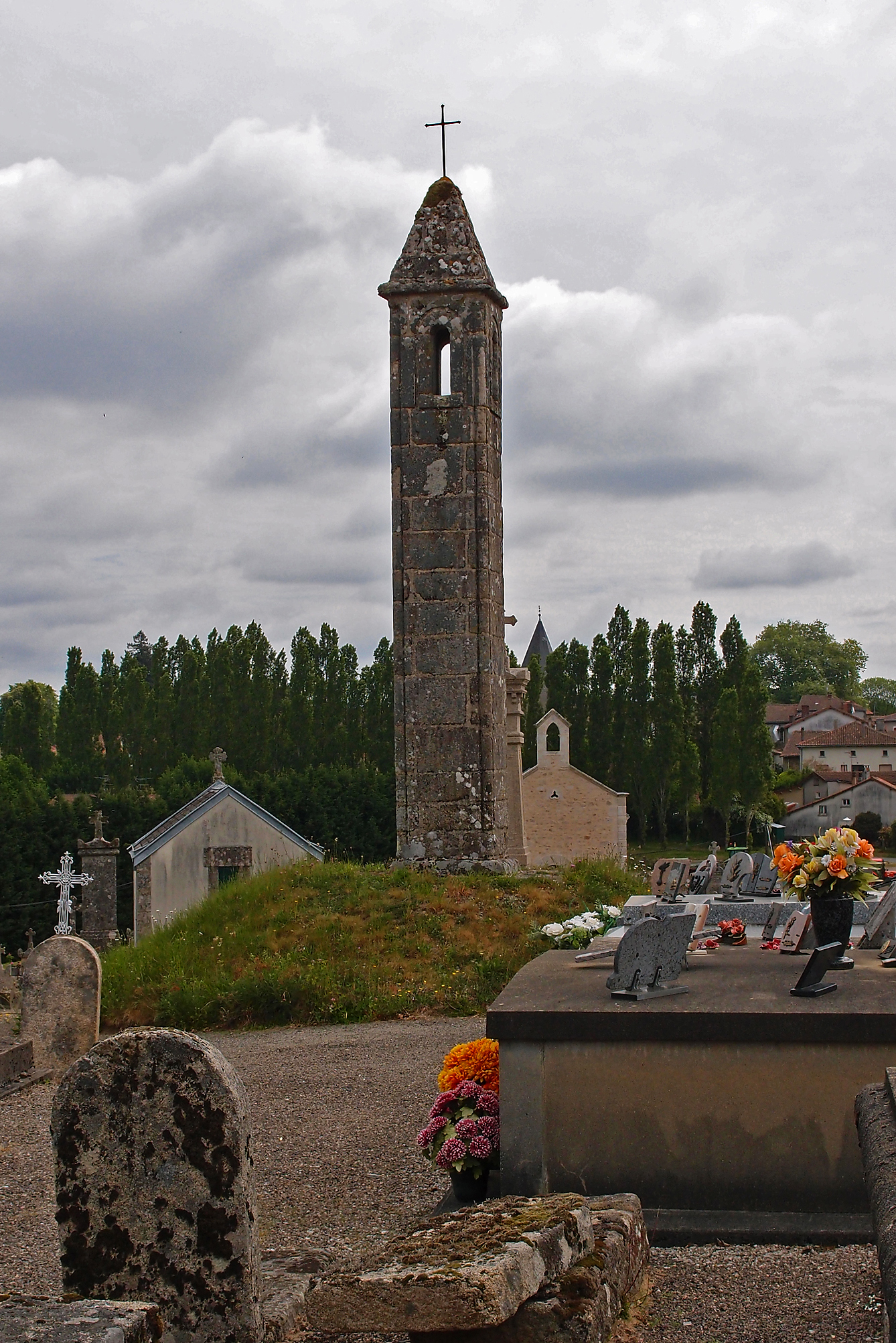
- The Lanterne des Morts, in Cognac-la-Forêt

- Coat of arms
- Location of Cognac-la-Forêt
- Location within France Location within Nouvelle-Aquitaine
- Coordinates: 45°50′05″N 1°00′40″E
- Country: France
- Region: Nouvelle-Aquitaine
- Department: Haute-Vienne
- Arrondissement: Rochechouart
- Canton: Rochechouart

Government
  - Mayor (2020–2026): Christian Vignerie
- Area^{1}: 31.56 km^{2} (12.19 sq mi)
- Highest elevation: 418 m (1,371 ft)
- Lowest elevation: 171 m (561 ft)
- Population (2023): 1,188
  - Density: 37.64/km^{2} (97.49/sq mi)
- Time zone: UTC+01:00 (CET)
  - Summer (DST): UTC+02:00 (CEST)
- INSEE/Postal code: 87046 /87310
- ^{1} French Land Register data, which excludes lakes, ponds, glaciers > 1 km^{2} (0.386 sq mi or 247 acres) and river estuaries.

Cognac-la-Forêt (French pronunciation: [kɔɲak la fɔʁɛ]; Occitan: Conhac la Forest) is a commune in the Haute-Vienne department in the Nouvelle-Aquitaine region in western France.

== See also ==
- Communes of the Haute-Vienne department
