= Chéronnac =

- Commune
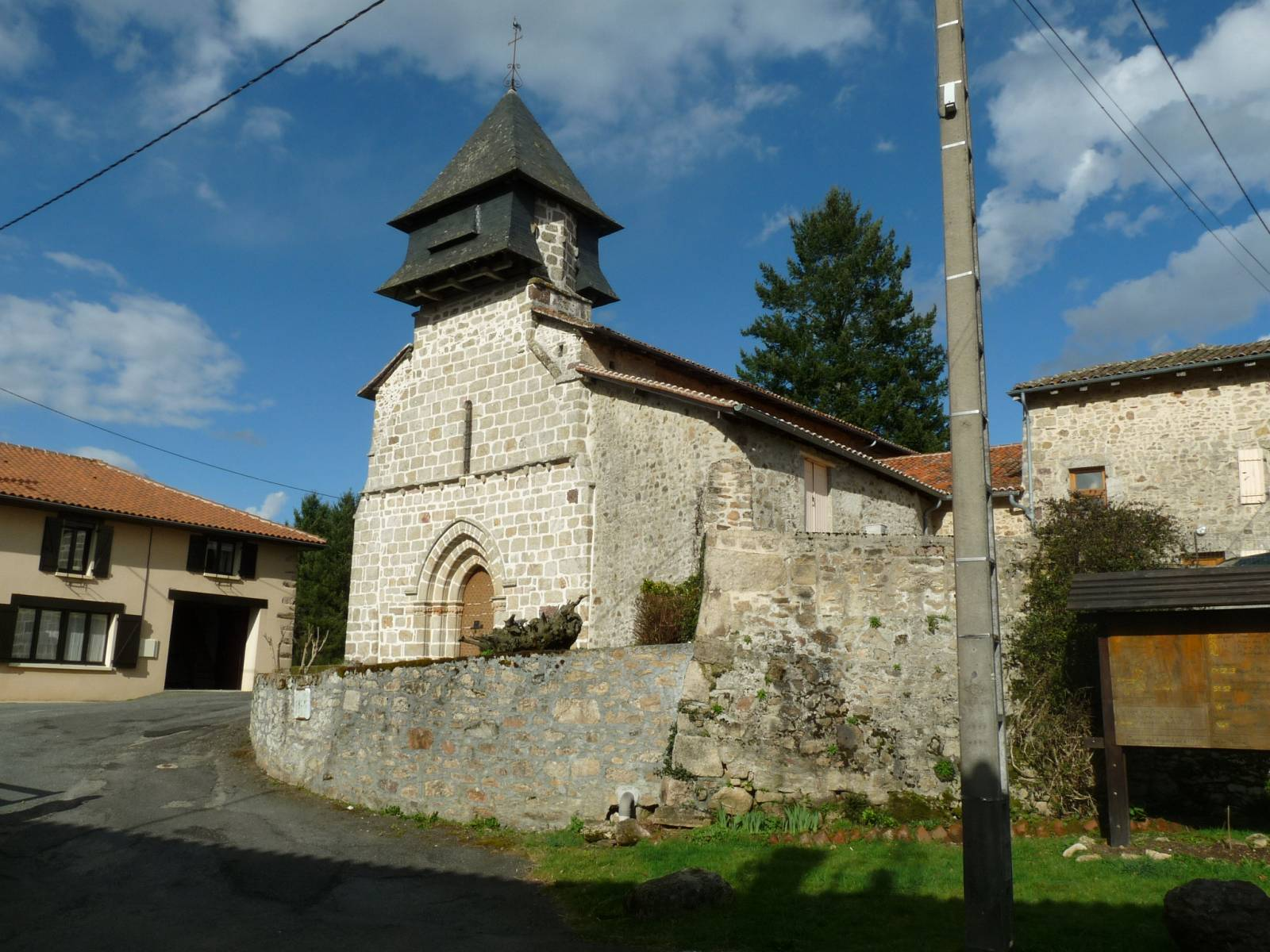
- The church in Chéronnac

- Coat of arms
- Location of Chéronnac
- Location within France Location within Nouvelle-Aquitaine
- Coordinates: 45°45′35″N 0°45′53″E
- Country: France
- Region: Nouvelle-Aquitaine
- Department: Haute-Vienne
- Arrondissement: Rochechouart
- Canton: Rochechouart

Government
  - Mayor (2020–2026): Raymond Vouzellaud
- Area^{1}: 18.90 km^{2} (7.30 sq mi)
- Highest elevation: 323 m (1,060 ft)
- Lowest elevation: 217 m (712 ft)
- Population (2023): 314
  - Density: 16.6/km^{2} (43.0/sq mi)
- Time zone: UTC+01:00 (CET)
  - Summer (DST): UTC+02:00 (CEST)
- INSEE/Postal code: 87044 /87600
- ^{1} French Land Register data, which excludes lakes, ponds, glaciers > 1 km^{2} (0.386 sq mi or 247 acres) and river estuaries.

Chéronnac (French pronunciation: [ʃeʁɔnak]; Occitan: Charennac) is a commune in the Haute-Vienne department, in the Nouvelle-Aquitaine region, western France.

== Geography ==
At Chéronnac is the source of the river Charente.

Inhabitants are known as Chéronnacais.

The village holds an Oyster Festival every 4 years where chariots carrying oysters are taken through the village.

== See also ==
- Rochechouart impact structure
- Communes of the Haute-Vienne department
