= Oradour-sur-Vayres =

- Commune
- Coat of arms
- Location of Oradour-sur-Vayres
- Location within France Location within Nouvelle-Aquitaine
- Coordinates: 45°44′00″N 0°52′04″E
- Country: France
- Region: Nouvelle-Aquitaine
- Department: Haute-Vienne
- Arrondissement: Rochechouart
- Canton: Rochechouart
- Intercommunality: Ouest Limousin

Government
  - Mayor (2020–2026): Richard Simonneau
- Area^{1}: 39.09 km^{2} (15.09 sq mi)
- Highest elevation: 370 m (1,210 ft)
- Lowest elevation: 246 m (807 ft)
- Population (2023): 1,607
  - Density: 41.11/km^{2} (106.5/sq mi)
- Time zone: UTC+01:00 (CET)
  - Summer (DST): UTC+02:00 (CEST)
- INSEE/Postal code: 87111 /87150
- Website: www.oradour-sur-vayres.fr
- ^{1} French Land Register data, which excludes lakes, ponds, glaciers > 1 km^{2} (0.386 sq mi or 247 acres) and river estuaries.

Oradour-sur-Vayres (French pronunciation: [ɔʁaduʁ syʁ vɛʁ]; Occitan: Orador (de Vairas)) is a commune in the Haute-Vienne department in the Nouvelle-Aquitaine region in west-central France.

== History ==
=== Oradour-sur-Glane massacre ===
The Oradour-sur-Glane massacre occurred based on erroneous intelligence indicating that villagers of the nearby village of Oradour-sur-Glane were providing food and shelter to the maquis, but that in fact happened in Oradour-sur-Vayres.

== Gallery ==
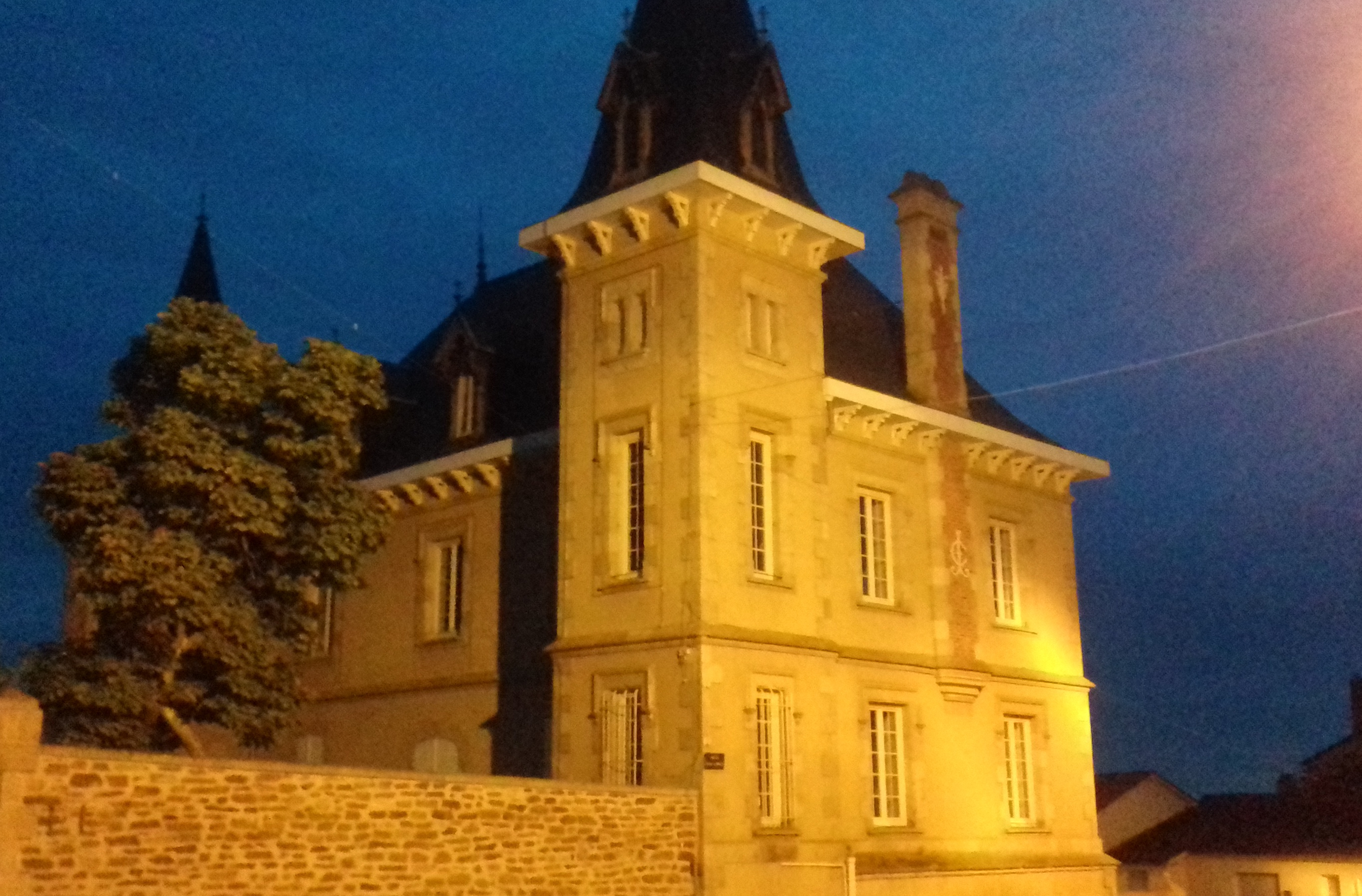
Back of town hall

== See also ==
- Communes of the Haute-Vienne department
