= Videix =

- Commune
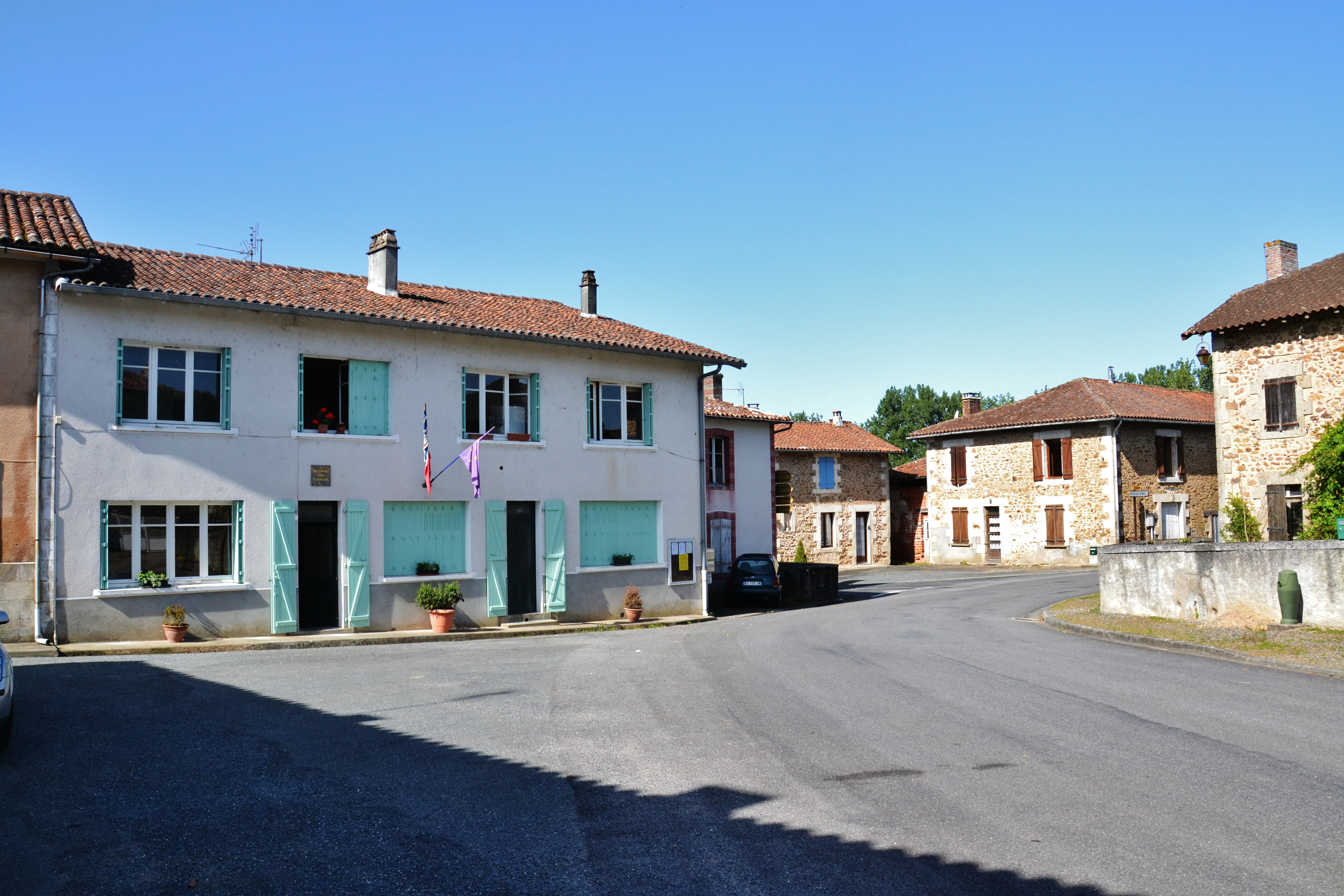
- A view within the village of Videix

- Coat of arms
- Location of Videix
- Location within France Location within Nouvelle-Aquitaine
- Coordinates: 45°47′31″N 0°44′10″E
- Country: France
- Region: Nouvelle-Aquitaine
- Department: Haute-Vienne
- Arrondissement: Rochechouart
- Canton: Rochechouart
- Intercommunality: Porte Océane du Limousin

Government
  - Mayor (2020–2026): Edouard Coquillaud
- Area^{1}: 16.63 km^{2} (6.42 sq mi)
- Highest elevation: 307 m (1,007 ft)
- Lowest elevation: 219 m (719 ft)
- Population (2023): 206
  - Density: 12.4/km^{2} (32.1/sq mi)
- Time zone: UTC+01:00 (CET)
  - Summer (DST): UTC+02:00 (CEST)
- INSEE/Postal code: 87204 /87600
- ^{1} French Land Register data, which excludes lakes, ponds, glaciers > 1 km^{2} (0.386 sq mi or 247 acres) and river estuaries.

Videix (Occitan: Vidais) is a commune in the Haute-Vienne department in the Nouvelle-Aquitaine region in south west France. The village of St. Gervais is part of the commune of Videix and a bar, known as Gibson Bar, is situated on the main through road in St. Gervais, running from Rochechouart to La Rochefoucauld.

== See also ==
- Communes of the Haute-Vienne department
