= La Chapelle-Montbrandeix =

- Commune
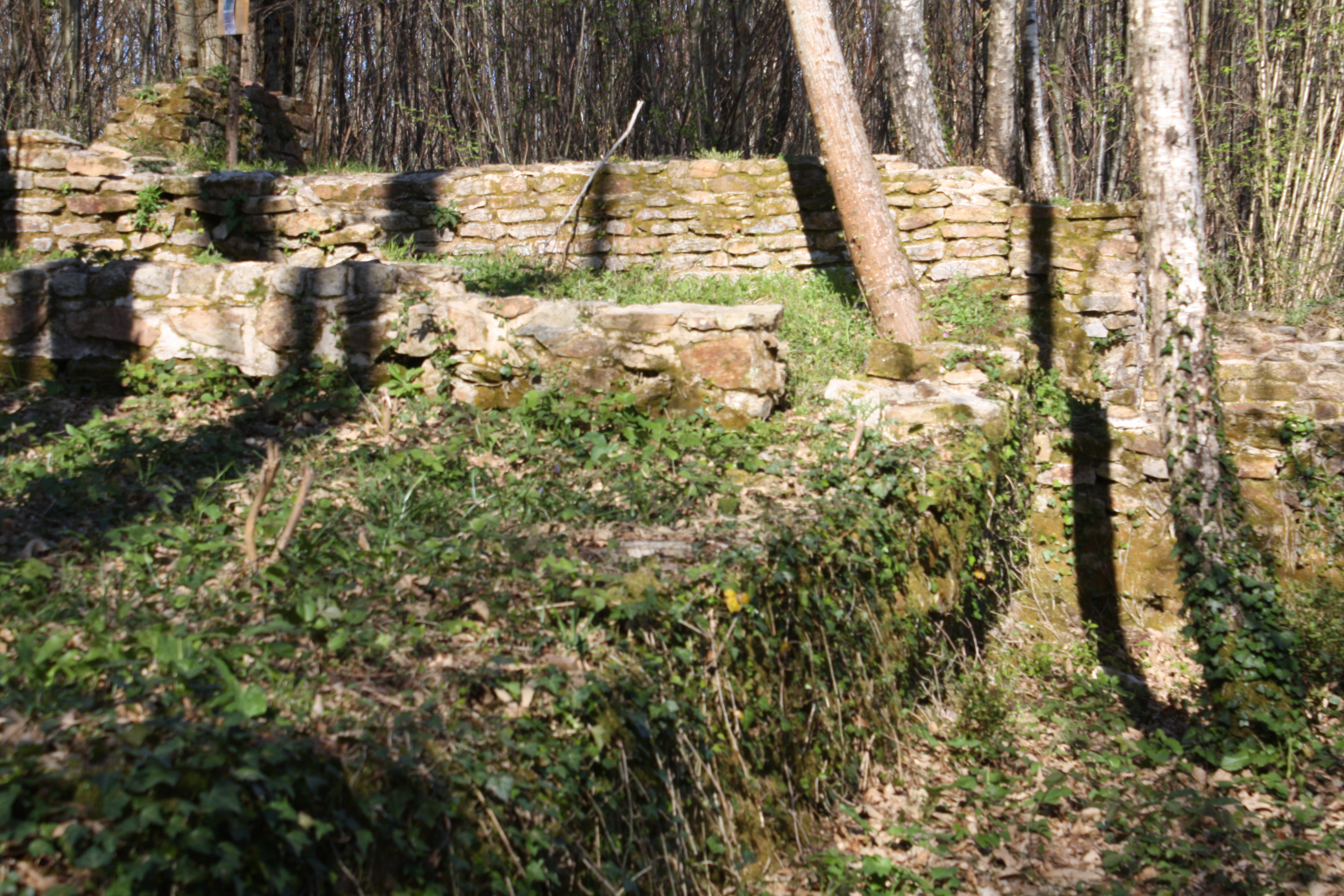
- The Gisement gallo-romain des Couvents, in La Chapelle-de Montbrandeix

- Coat of arms
- Location of La Chapelle-Montbrandeix
- Location within France Location within Nouvelle-Aquitaine
- Coordinates: 45°38′48″N 0°50′50″E
- Country: France
- Region: Nouvelle-Aquitaine
- Department: Haute-Vienne
- Arrondissement: Rochechouart
- Canton: Rochechouart

Government
  - Mayor (2021–2026): Séverine Dureisseix
- Area^{1}: 19.83 km^{2} (7.66 sq mi)
- Highest elevation: 482 m (1,581 ft)
- Lowest elevation: 319 m (1,047 ft)
- Population (2023): 263
  - Density: 13.3/km^{2} (34.4/sq mi)
- Time zone: UTC+01:00 (CET)
  - Summer (DST): UTC+02:00 (CEST)
- INSEE/Postal code: 87037 /87440
- ^{1} French Land Register data, which excludes lakes, ponds, glaciers > 1 km^{2} (0.386 sq mi or 247 acres) and river estuaries.

La Chapelle-Montbrandeix (Occitan: La Chapéla) is a commune in the Haute-Vienne department in the Nouvelle-Aquitaine region in western France.

Inhabitants are known as Chapelauds.

== See also ==
- Communes of the Haute-Vienne department
