= Saint-Laurent-sur-Gorre =

- Commune
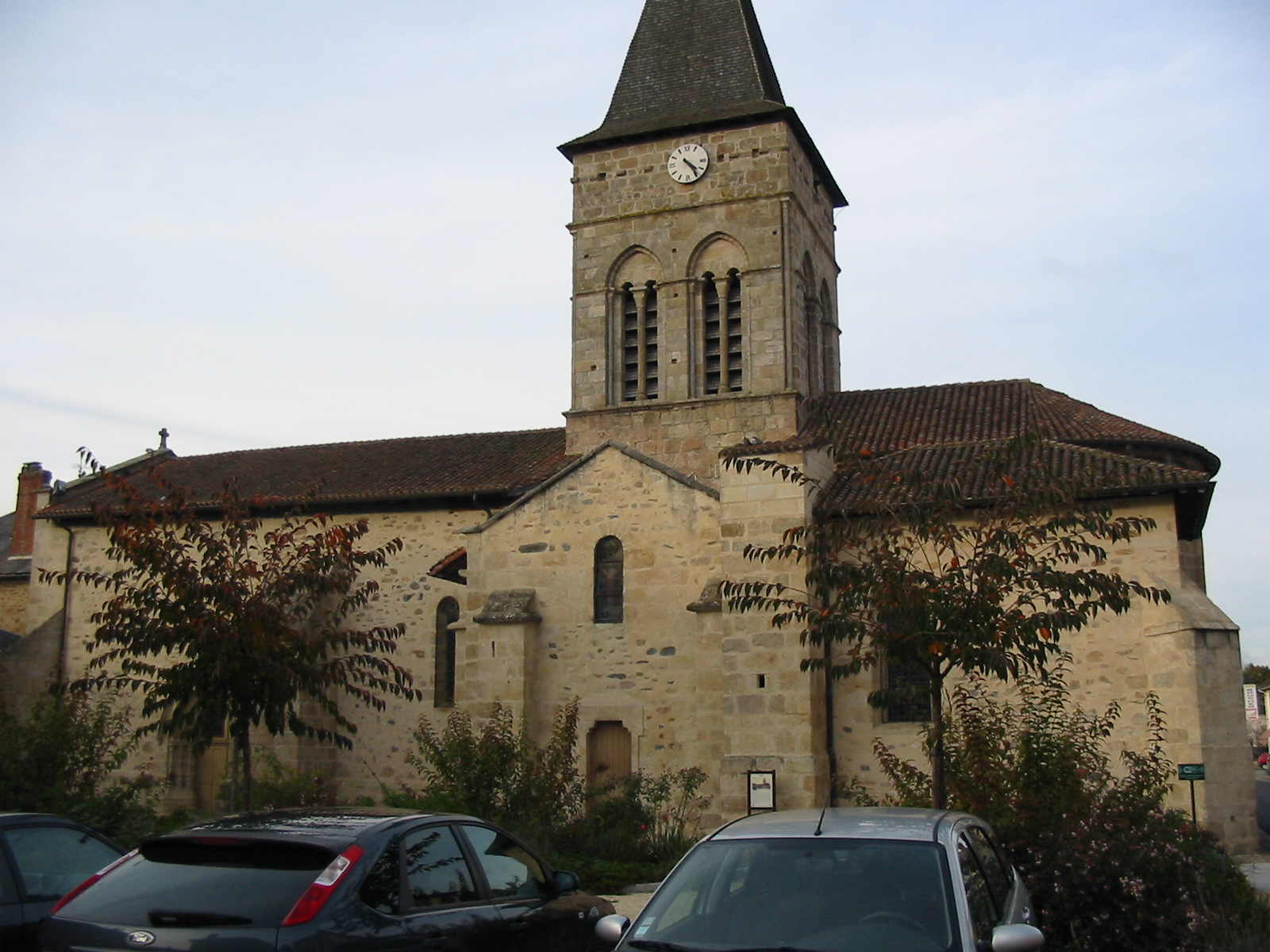
- The church in Saint-Laurent-sur-Gorre

- Coat of arms
- Location of Saint-Laurent-sur-Gorre
- Location within France Location within Nouvelle-Aquitaine
- Coordinates: 45°46′15″N 0°57′32″E
- Country: France
- Region: Nouvelle-Aquitaine
- Department: Haute-Vienne
- Arrondissement: Rochechouart
- Canton: Rochechouart

Government
  - Mayor (2020–2026): Pierre Varachaud
- Area^{1}: 39.92 km^{2} (15.41 sq mi)
- Highest elevation: 410 m (1,350 ft)
- Lowest elevation: 236 m (774 ft)
- Population (2023): 1,378
  - Density: 34.52/km^{2} (89.40/sq mi)
- Time zone: UTC+01:00 (CET)
  - Summer (DST): UTC+02:00 (CEST)
- INSEE/Postal code: 87158 /87310
- ^{1} French Land Register data, which excludes lakes, ponds, glaciers > 1 km^{2} (0.386 sq mi or 247 acres) and river estuaries.

Saint-Laurent-sur-Gorre (French pronunciation: [sɛ̃ loʁɑ̃ syʁ ɡɔʁ]; Occitan: Sent Laurenç de Gòra) is a commune in the Haute-Vienne department in the Nouvelle-Aquitaine region in west-central France.

Inhabitants are known as Laurentais.

== See also ==
- Communes of the Haute-Vienne department
