= Château de Montbrun =

Castle in Haute-Vienne, France

Coordinates: 45°38′10″N 0°53′53″E

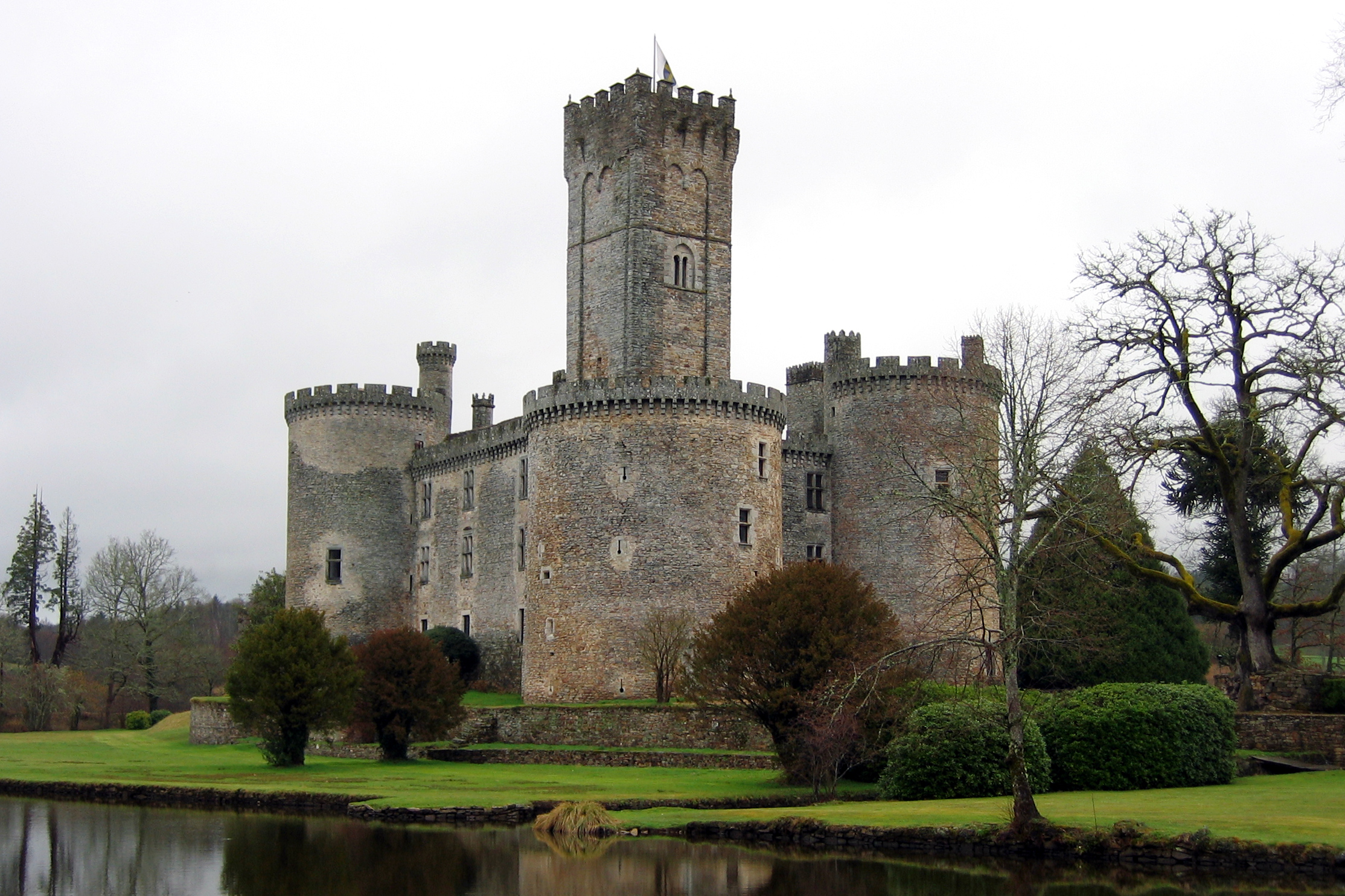
Château de Montbrun

The Château de Montbrun is a castle in the commune of Dournazac in the Haute-Vienne département of France. The castle was built in the 12th and 15th centuries, and was restored in the late 19th century.

The castle stands within a deep valley. Built in the 12th century, its function was to defend the borders of the Duchy of Aquitaine. Though rebuilt in the 15th century, it still has the moat, high walls and a square keep topped with machicolations.

Montbrun is a fine example of a 15th-century castle. In plan rectangular, it is flanked in the corners with round towers and protected by water. Its narrow romanesque keep, 40 metres (131 ft) square, close up against one of the towers, gives it a strange appearance.

== History ==
The castle (then called Trados) was built in 1179 by Aymeric Bruni (also called Brun) on his return from the Second Crusade. The Brun family, (Montbrun after 1366), remained owners until 1516. At the start of the Hundred Years' War, the castle was occupied by the English. It was retaken by the French in 1353. At the end of the century it was taken again by the English and partially destroyed. Between 1433 and 1438, square towers were replaced with round towers and the castle took on its present form.

In 1562, Montbrun was attacked by Protestants during the Wars of Religion and although it was not captured a fire raged through the castle.

During the French Revolution, at the instigation of people's representatives Borie and Jacques Brival, the castle was pillaged and destroyed and the archives were burned. The property was divided up and sold as national property.

Restored in 1871, it suffered a serious fire in 1916. A second restoration was carried out between 1964 and 1966.

It has been a protected monument historique listed by the French Ministry of Culture.

In 1995, the castle was bought by Maarten Lamers, a Dutch businessman. He restored the castle, finalizing it in 2000

== See also ==
- List of castles in France
