= Saint-Bazile =

- Commune
- Coat of arms
- Location of Saint-Bazile
- Location within France Location within Nouvelle-Aquitaine
- Coordinates: 45°44′00″N 0°49′42″E
- Country: France
- Region: Nouvelle-Aquitaine
- Department: Haute-Vienne
- Arrondissement: Rochechouart
- Canton: Rochechouart

Government
  - Mayor (2020–2026): Philippe Lalay
- Area^{1}: 8.58 km^{2} (3.31 sq mi)
- Highest elevation: 333 m (1,093 ft)
- Lowest elevation: 247 m (810 ft)
- Population (2023): 146
  - Density: 17.0/km^{2} (44.1/sq mi)
- Time zone: UTC+01:00 (CET)
  - Summer (DST): UTC+02:00 (CEST)
- INSEE/Postal code: 87137 /87150
- ^{1} French Land Register data, which excludes lakes, ponds, glaciers > 1 km^{2} (0.386 sq mi or 247 acres) and river estuaries.

Saint-Bazile (Occitan: Sent Basaris) is a commune in the Haute-Vienne department in the Nouvelle-Aquitaine region in west-central France.

== See also ==
- Communes of the Haute-Vienne department
