= Champagnac-la-Rivière =

- Commune
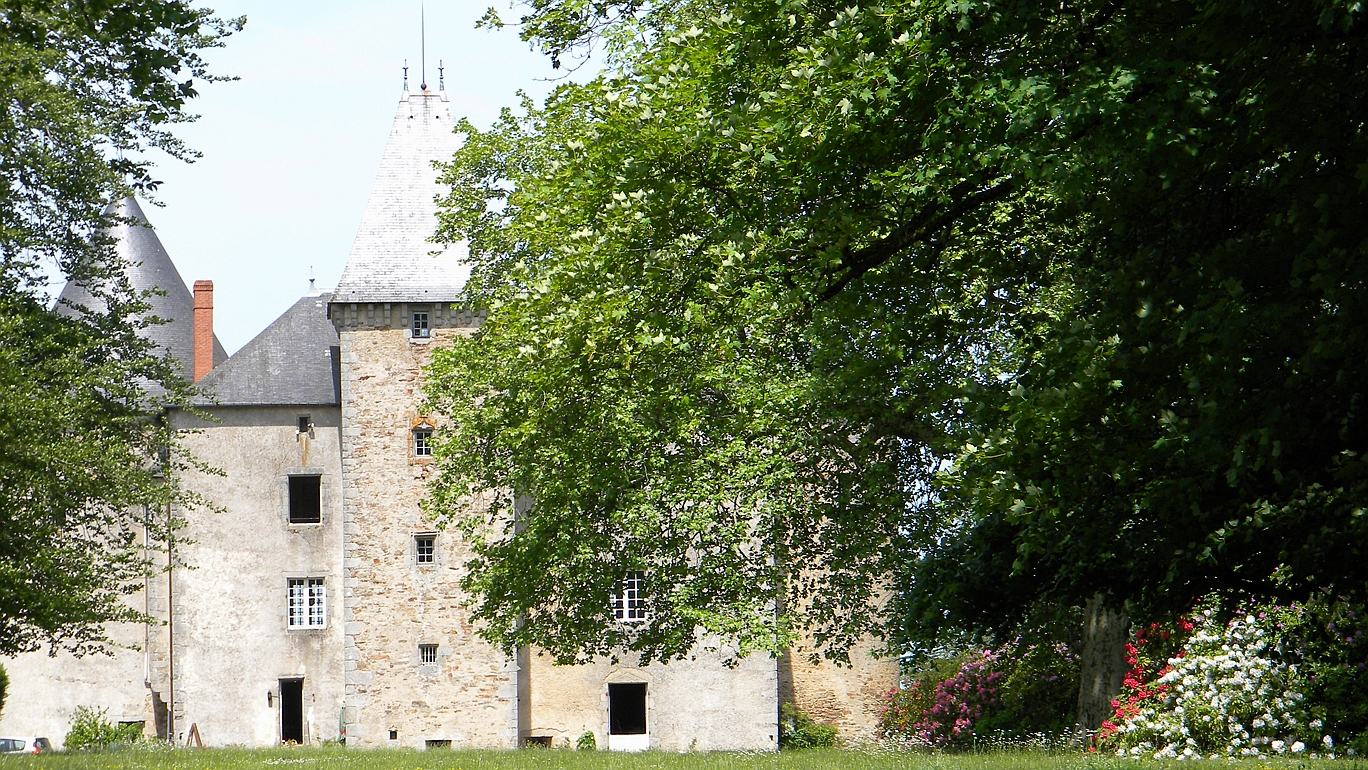
- The château de Brie, in Champagnac

- Coat of arms
- Location of Champagnac-la-Rivière
- Location within France Location within Nouvelle-Aquitaine
- Coordinates: 45°42′38″N 0°54′47″E
- Country: France
- Region: Nouvelle-Aquitaine
- Department: Haute-Vienne
- Arrondissement: Rochechouart
- Canton: Rochechouart

Government
  - Mayor (2020–2026): Joël Vilard
- Area^{1}: 24.46 km^{2} (9.44 sq mi)
- Highest elevation: 473 m (1,552 ft)
- Lowest elevation: 278 m (912 ft)
- Population (2023): 603
  - Density: 24.7/km^{2} (63.8/sq mi)
- Time zone: UTC+01:00 (CET)
  - Summer (DST): UTC+02:00 (CEST)
- INSEE/Postal code: 87034 /87150
- ^{1} French Land Register data, which excludes lakes, ponds, glaciers > 1 km^{2} (0.386 sq mi or 247 acres) and river estuaries.

Champagnac-la-Rivière (French pronunciation: [ʃɑ̃paɲak la ʁivjɛʁ]; Occitan: Champanhac) is a commune in the Haute-Vienne department in the Nouvelle-Aquitaine region in western France.

== See also ==
- Communes of the Haute-Vienne department
