= Pensol =

- Commune
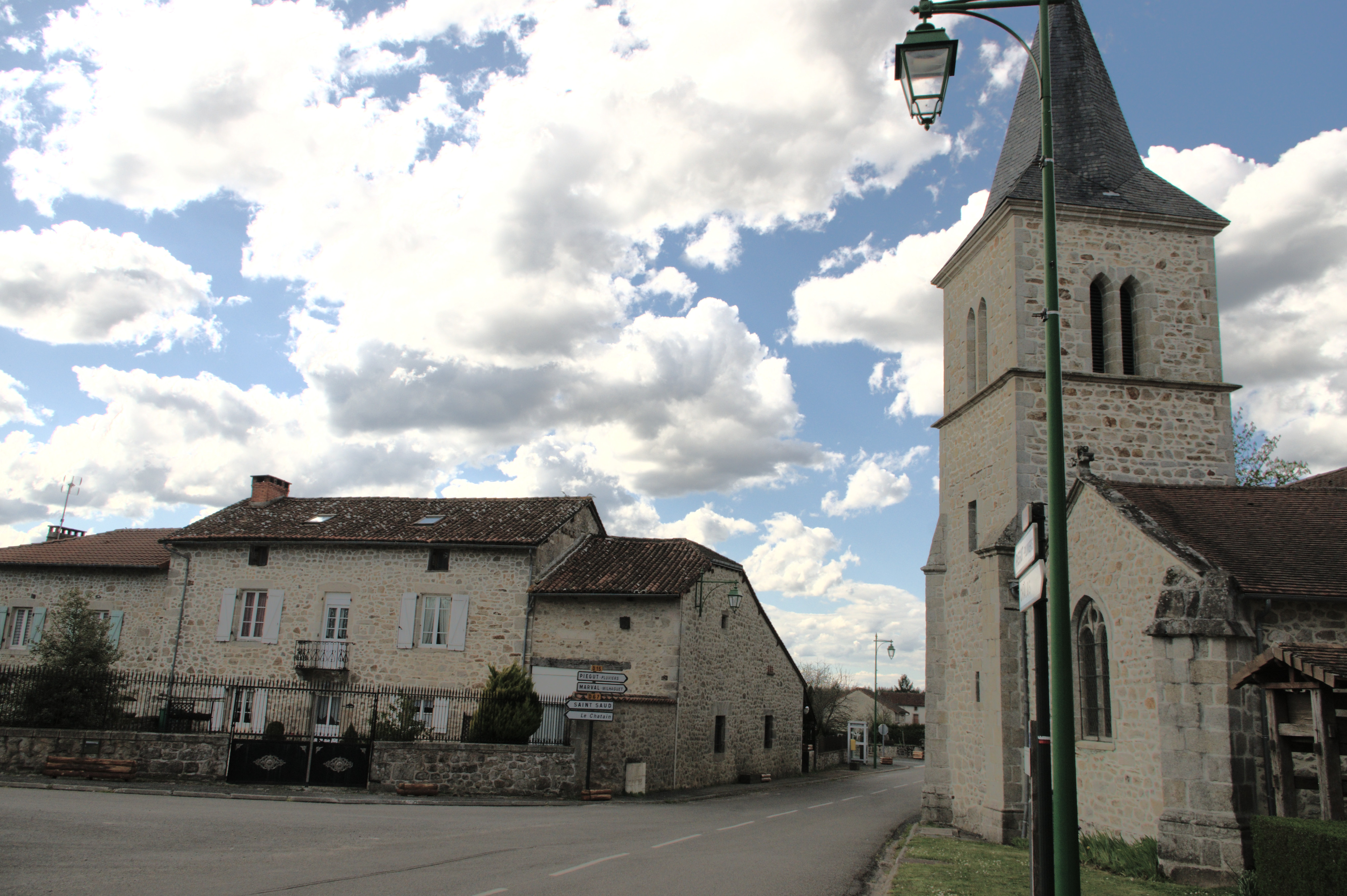
- The church in Pensol and other buildings

- Coat of arms
- Location of Pensol
- Location within France Location within Nouvelle-Aquitaine
- Coordinates: 45°36′41″N 0°49′36″E
- Country: France
- Region: Nouvelle-Aquitaine
- Department: Haute-Vienne
- Arrondissement: Rochechouart
- Canton: Rochechouart

Government
  - Mayor (2020–2026): Bertrand Jayat
- Area^{1}: 15.04 km^{2} (5.81 sq mi)
- Highest elevation: 382 m (1,253 ft)
- Lowest elevation: 288 m (945 ft)
- Population (2023): 186
  - Density: 12.4/km^{2} (32.0/sq mi)
- Time zone: UTC+01:00 (CET)
  - Summer (DST): UTC+02:00 (CEST)
- INSEE/Postal code: 87115 /87440
- ^{1} French Land Register data, which excludes lakes, ponds, glaciers > 1 km^{2} (0.386 sq mi or 247 acres) and river estuaries.

Pensol (French pronunciation: [pɑ̃sɔl]; Occitan: Pansòu) is a commune in the Haute-Vienne department in the Nouvelle-Aquitaine region in west-central France.

== See also ==
- Communes of the Haute-Vienne department
