= Saint-Cyr, Haute-Vienne =

Saint-Cyr
- Commune
- Coat of arms
- Location of Saint-Cyr
- Location within France Location within Nouvelle-Aquitaine
- Coordinates: 45°48′04″N 0°57′33″E
- Country: France
- Region: Nouvelle-Aquitaine
- Department: Haute-Vienne
- Arrondissement: Rochechouart
- Canton: Rochechouart

Government
  - Mayor (2020–2026): Louis Furlaud
- Area^{1}: 21.30 km^{2} (8.22 sq mi)
- Highest elevation: 396 m (1,299 ft)
- Lowest elevation: 230 m (750 ft)
- Population (2023): 676
  - Density: 31.7/km^{2} (82.2/sq mi)
- Time zone: UTC+01:00 (CET)
  - Summer (DST): UTC+02:00 (CEST)
- INSEE/Postal code: 87141 /87310
- ^{1} French Land Register data, which excludes lakes, ponds, glaciers > 1 km^{2} (0.386 sq mi or 247 acres) and river estuaries.

Saint-Cyr (French pronunciation: [sɛ̃ siʁ]; Limousin: Sent Circ) is a commune in the Haute-Vienne department in the Nouvelle-Aquitaine region in west-central France.

== See also ==
- Communes of the Haute-Vienne department
