= Dournazac =

- Commune
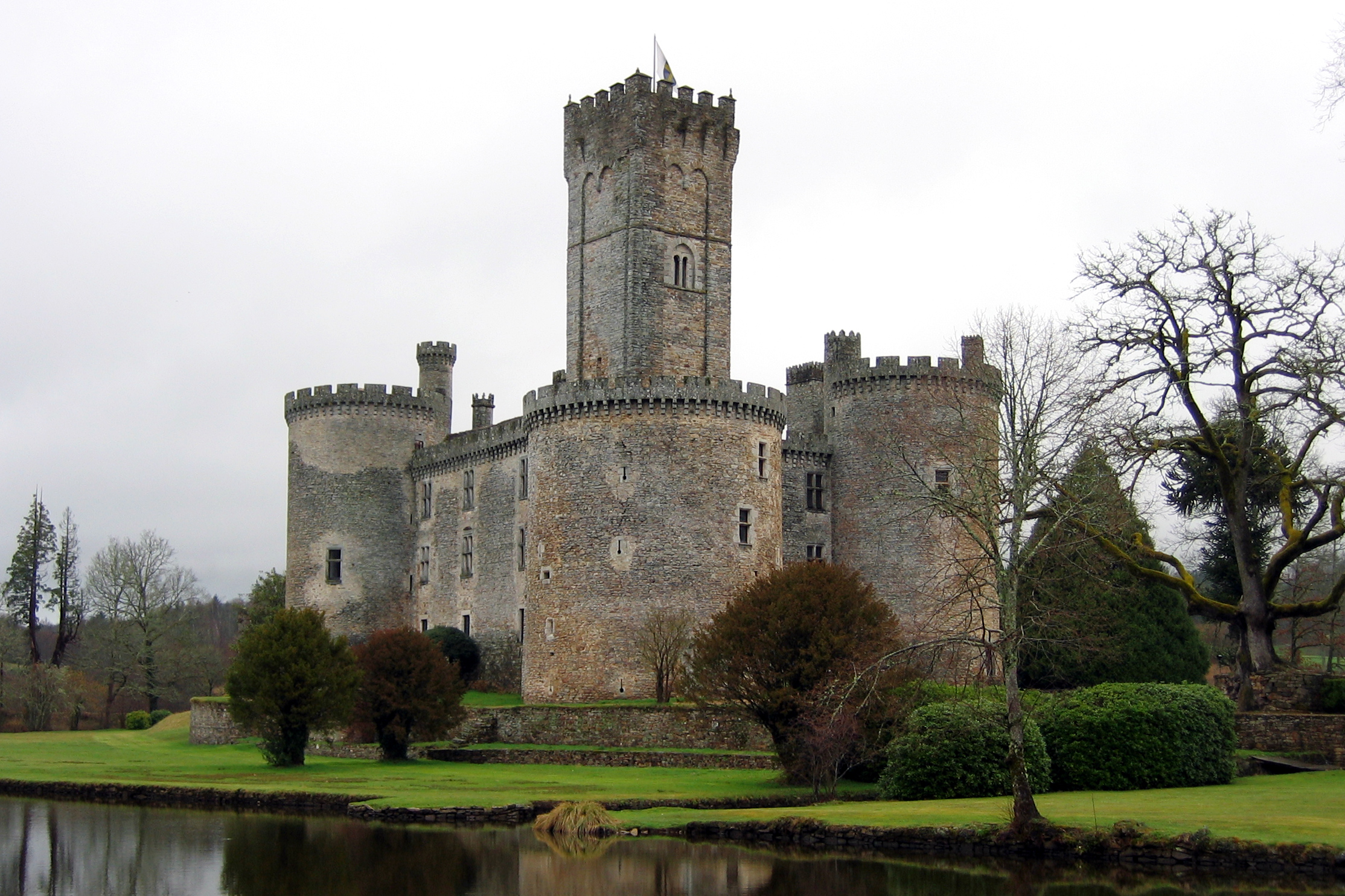
- Château de Montbrun

- Coat of arms
- Location of Dournazac
- Location within France Location within Nouvelle-Aquitaine
- Coordinates: 45°37′33″N 0°55′02″E
- Country: France
- Region: Nouvelle-Aquitaine
- Department: Haute-Vienne
- Arrondissement: Rochechouart
- Canton: Rochechouart

Government
  - Mayor (2020–2026): Christian Bonnat
- Area^{1}: 35.97 km^{2} (13.89 sq mi)
- Highest elevation: 498 m (1,634 ft)
- Lowest elevation: 288 m (945 ft)
- Population (2023): 672
  - Density: 18.7/km^{2} (48.4/sq mi)
- Time zone: UTC+01:00 (CET)
  - Summer (DST): UTC+02:00 (CEST)
- INSEE/Postal code: 87060 /87230
- ^{1} French Land Register data, which excludes lakes, ponds, glaciers > 1 km^{2} (0.386 sq mi or 247 acres) and river estuaries.

Dournazac (Occitan: Dornasac) is a commune in the Haute-Vienne department in the Nouvelle-Aquitaine region in western France.

Inhabitants are known as Dournazacois.

== See also ==
- Château de Montbrun
- Communes of the Haute-Vienne department
