= Les Salles-Lavauguyon =

- Commune
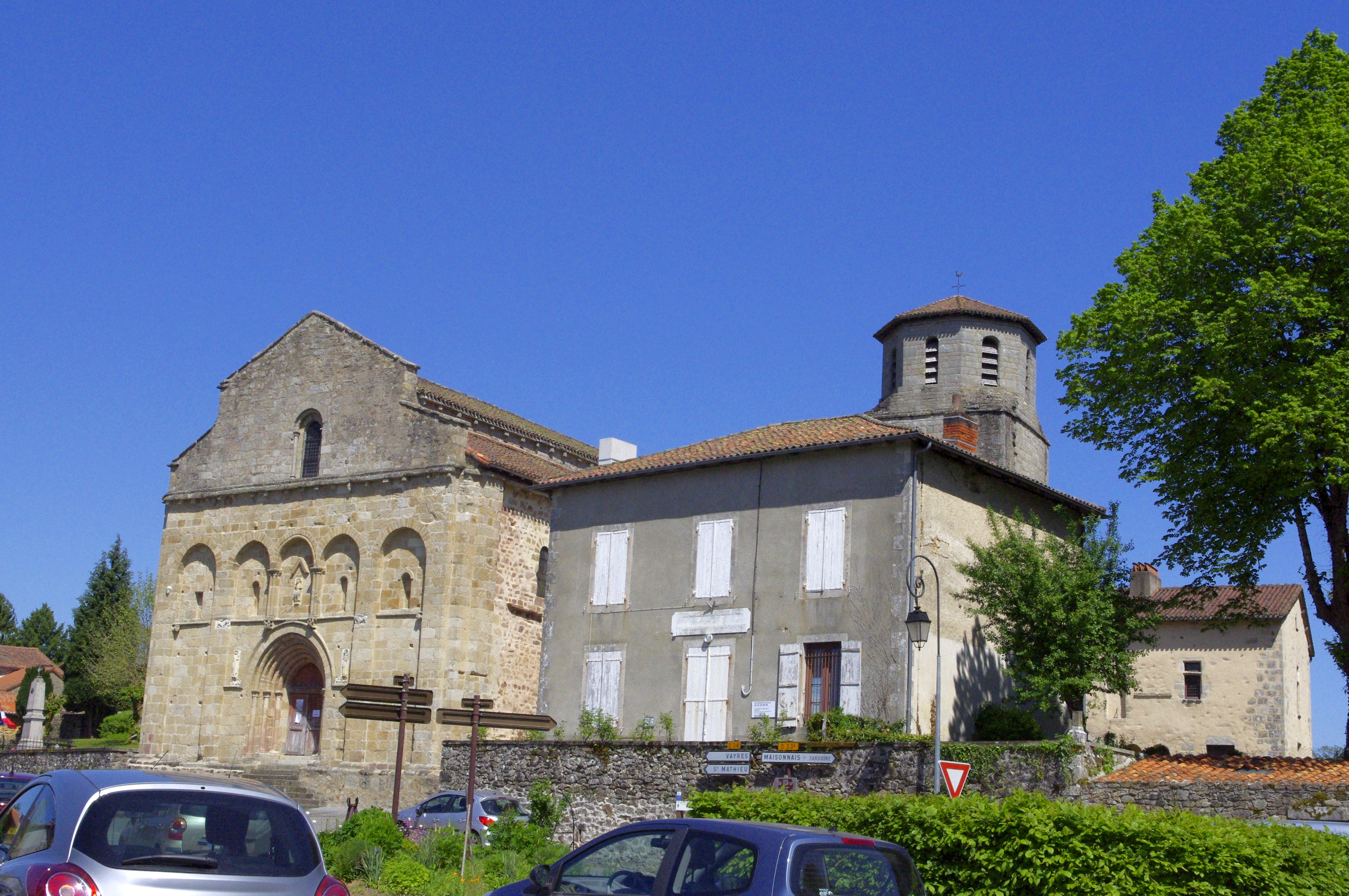
- The church of Saint-Eutrope with the priory

- Coat of arms
- Location of Les Salles-Lavauguyon
- Location within France Location within Nouvelle-Aquitaine
- Coordinates: 45°44′41″N 0°41′46″E
- Country: France
- Region: Nouvelle-Aquitaine
- Department: Haute-Vienne
- Arrondissement: Rochechouart
- Canton: Rochechouart
- Intercommunality: Porte Océane du Limousin

Government
  - Mayor (2020–2026): Christine Ballay
- Area^{1}: 12.32 km^{2} (4.76 sq mi)
- Highest elevation: 301 m (988 ft)
- Lowest elevation: 194 m (636 ft)
- Population (2023): 157
  - Density: 12.7/km^{2} (33.0/sq mi)
- Time zone: UTC+01:00 (CET)
  - Summer (DST): UTC+02:00 (CEST)
- INSEE/Postal code: 87189 /87440
- ^{1} French Land Register data, which excludes lakes, ponds, glaciers > 1 km^{2} (0.386 sq mi or 247 acres) and river estuaries.

Les Salles-Lavauguyon (French pronunciation: [le sal lavoɡɥijɔ̃]; Occitan: Las Salas la Vau Guion) is a commune in the Haute-Vienne department in the Nouvelle-Aquitaine region in west-central France.

== See also ==
- Communes of the Haute-Vienne department
