= Gorre =

- Commune
- Coat of arms
- Location of Gorre
- Location within France Location within Nouvelle-Aquitaine
- Coordinates: 45°44′29″N 0°59′01″E
- Country: France
- Region: Nouvelle-Aquitaine
- Department: Haute-Vienne
- Arrondissement: Rochechouart
- Canton: Rochechouart

Government
  - Mayor (2020–2026): Patrice Chauvel
- Area^{1}: 16.17 km^{2} (6.24 sq mi)
- Highest elevation: 382 m (1,253 ft)
- Lowest elevation: 255 m (837 ft)
- Population (2023): 388
  - Density: 24.0/km^{2} (62.1/sq mi)
- Time zone: UTC+01:00 (CET)
  - Summer (DST): UTC+02:00 (CEST)
- INSEE/Postal code: 87073 /87310
- ^{1} French Land Register data, which excludes lakes, ponds, glaciers > 1 km^{2} (0.386 sq mi or 247 acres) and river estuaries.

Gorre (French pronunciation: [ɡɔʁ]; Occitan: Gòra) is a commune in the Haute-Vienne department in the Nouvelle-Aquitaine region in west-central France.

Inhabitants of Gorre are known as Gorrois.

== See also ==
- Communes of the Haute-Vienne department
