= Canton of Rochechouart =

Coordinates: 45.82°N 0.82°E

The canton of Rochechouart is an administrative division of the Haute-Vienne department, western France. Its borders were modified at the French canton reorganisation which came into effect in March 2015. Its seat is in Rochechouart.

It consists of the following communes:

1. Champagnac-la-Rivière
2. Champsac
3. La Chapelle-Montbrandeix
4. Chéronnac
5. Cognac-la-Forêt
6. Cussac
7. Dournazac
8. Gorre
9. Maisonnais-sur-Tardoire
10. Marval
11. Oradour-sur-Vayres
12. Pensol
13. Rochechouart
14. Saint-Auvent
15. Saint-Bazile
16. Saint-Cyr
17. Sainte-Marie-de-Vaux
18. Saint-Laurent-sur-Gorre
19. Saint-Mathieu
20. Les Salles-Lavauguyon
21. Vayres
22. Videix
