= Champsac =

- Commune
- Coat of arms
- Location of Champsac
- Location within France Location within Nouvelle-Aquitaine
- Coordinates: 45°42′13″N 0°57′27″E
- Country: France
- Region: Nouvelle-Aquitaine
- Department: Haute-Vienne
- Arrondissement: Rochechouart
- Canton: Rochechouart

Government
  - Mayor (2024–2026): Emeline Giambelluco
- Area^{1}: 23.94 km^{2} (9.24 sq mi)
- Highest elevation: 399 m (1,309 ft)
- Lowest elevation: 267 m (876 ft)
- Population (2023): 702
  - Density: 29.3/km^{2} (75.9/sq mi)
- Time zone: UTC+01:00 (CET)
  - Summer (DST): UTC+02:00 (CEST)
- INSEE/Postal code: 87036 /87230
- ^{1} French Land Register data, which excludes lakes, ponds, glaciers > 1 km^{2} (0.386 sq mi or 247 acres) and river estuaries.

Champsac (French pronunciation: [ʃɑ̃sak]; Occitan: Chamçac) is a commune in the Haute-Vienne department in the Nouvelle-Aquitaine region in western France, sitting near to both the Dordogne and Charente borders. Before the 2015 territorial reform, it was part of the region Limousin.

Inhabitants are known as Champsacois.

The village is situated within the Dordogne-Limousin National Park. Amenities within Champsac include a butcher, a baker, a hairdresser, a church, a wine merchant, and a bar/hotel/restaurant and tabac named 'Le Champsac'.

It is also very near to other amenities such as supermarkets, châteaux, lakes, cycle paths, fishing spots, etc., and sits approximately 30 minutes south-west of Limoges – Bellegarde Airport. The historic city of Limoges and towns/villages such as Rochechouart, Oradour-sur-Glane, Saint-Junien and Châlus are also close by.

== See also ==
- Communes of the Haute-Vienne department
