= Nancray-sur-Rimarde =

- Commune
- Coat of arms
- Location of Nancray-sur-Rimarde
- Location within France Location within Centre-Val de Loire
- Coordinates: 48°04′08″N 2°20′02″E
- Country: France
- Region: Centre-Val de Loire
- Department: Loiret
- Arrondissement: Pithiviers
- Canton: Le Malesherbois
- Intercommunality: Pithiverais-Gâtinais

Government
  - Mayor (2020–2026): Christian Barrier
- Area^{1}: 11.58 km^{2} (4.47 sq mi)
- Population (2023): 569
  - Density: 49.1/km^{2} (127/sq mi)
- Demonym: Nancréens
- Time zone: UTC+01:00 (CET)
  - Summer (DST): UTC+02:00 (CEST)
- INSEE/Postal code: 45220 /45340
- ^{1} French Land Register data, which excludes lakes, ponds, glaciers > 1 km^{2} (0.386 sq mi or 247 acres) and river estuaries.

Nancray-sur-Rimarde (French pronunciation: [nɑ̃kʁɛ syʁ ʁimaʁd]) is a commune in the Loiret department in north-central France.

== See also ==
- Communes of the Loiret department
