= Sainte-Marie-de-Vaux =

- Commune
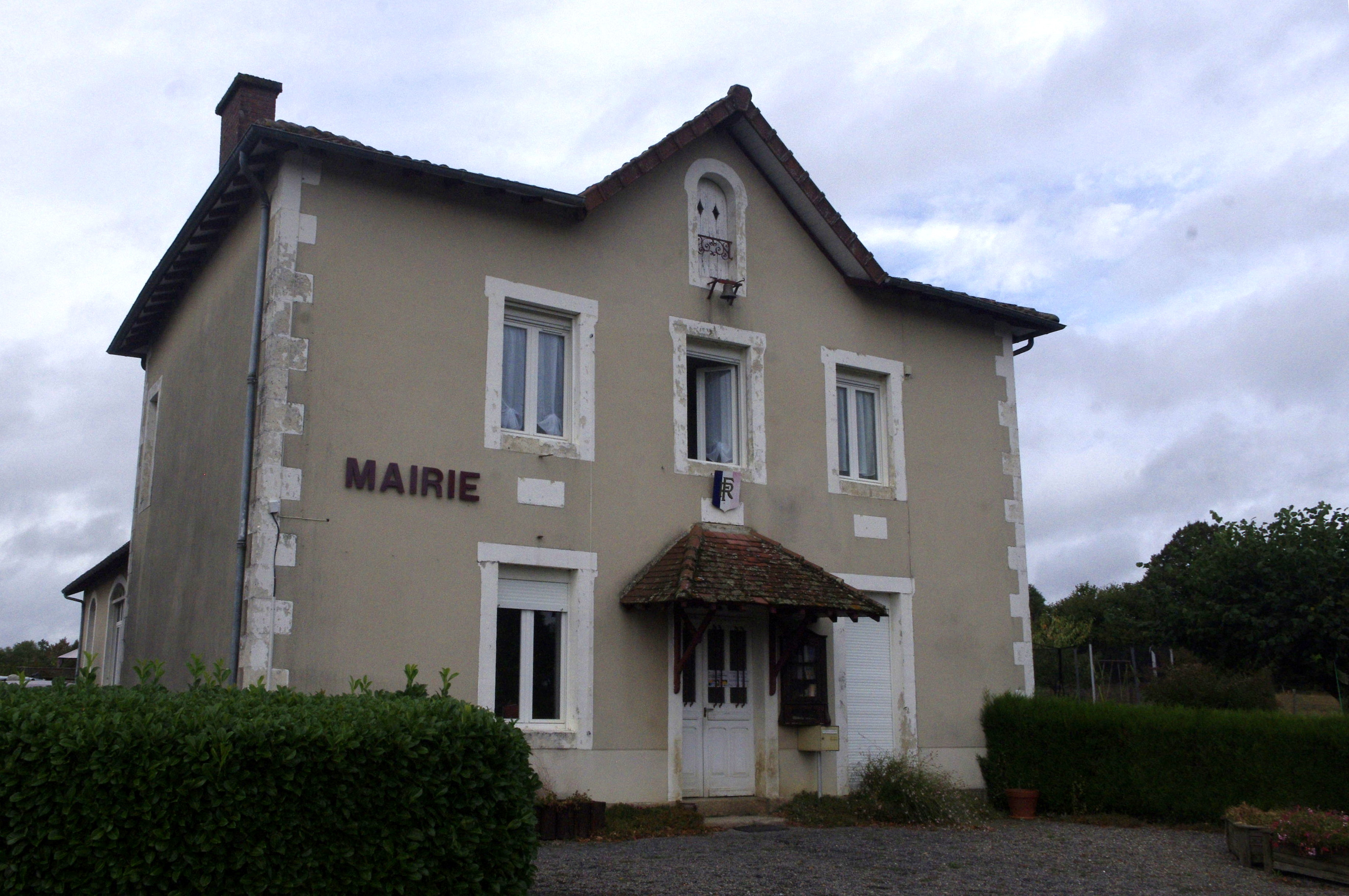
- Town hall

- Coat of arms
- Location of Sainte-Marie-de-Vaux
- Location within France Location within Nouvelle-Aquitaine
- Coordinates: 45°51′56″N 1°02′55″E
- Country: France
- Region: Nouvelle-Aquitaine
- Department: Haute-Vienne
- Arrondissement: Rochechouart
- Canton: Rochechouart

Government
  - Mayor (2020–2026): Patrick Chambord
- Area^{1}: 5.55 km^{2} (2.14 sq mi)
- Highest elevation: 344 m (1,129 ft)
- Lowest elevation: 177 m (581 ft)
- Population (2023): 209
  - Density: 37.7/km^{2} (97.5/sq mi)
- Time zone: UTC+01:00 (CET)
  - Summer (DST): UTC+02:00 (CEST)
- INSEE/Postal code: 87162 /87420
- ^{1} French Land Register data, which excludes lakes, ponds, glaciers > 1 km^{2} (0.386 sq mi or 247 acres) and river estuaries.

Sainte-Marie-de-Vaux (French pronunciation: [sɛ̃t maʁi də vo]; Occitan: Senta Marí de Vaus) is a commune in the Haute-Vienne department in the Nouvelle-Aquitaine region in west-central France.

== See also ==
- Communes of the Haute-Vienne department
