= Foucher de Limoges =

Historic blazon of the Viscounts of Limoges: Or three lions Azure armed and langued Gules.

Foucher de Limoges was the founder of the House of Limoges-Rochechouart, and the first Viscount of Limoges.

== Family ==
The second son of Raymond I, Count of Toulouse, and of Berteys, daughter of Rémi. The viscounts of Limoges and of Rochechouart are thus descended from the Counts of Rouergue and probably from the Count of Autun and from Théodoric, who founded the Autun dynasty c. 730.

== Viscount of Limoges ==
Foucher was a supporter of Charles the Bald and was rewarded for his services in the king's wars by being granted the Viscountcy of Limoges, which extended into Limousin and Berry. Foucher was crowned as viscount in 876 in Limoges and started minting his own coinage. The promulgation of the Capitulary of Quierzy the following year simultaneously freed the lords up from royal authority and made their titles and charges hereditary, thus giving birth to the French feudal system. Like other lords, the viscount of Limoges became an autonomous territory, administered by viscount Foucher. On his death, in 886, his son Hildebert became lord of Limoges, and then Hildebert's son Hildegaire, then Hildebert's grandson Géraud, establishing in a lasting way the dynasty of viscounts in their fiefdom of Limoges.
