= Marval =

- Commune
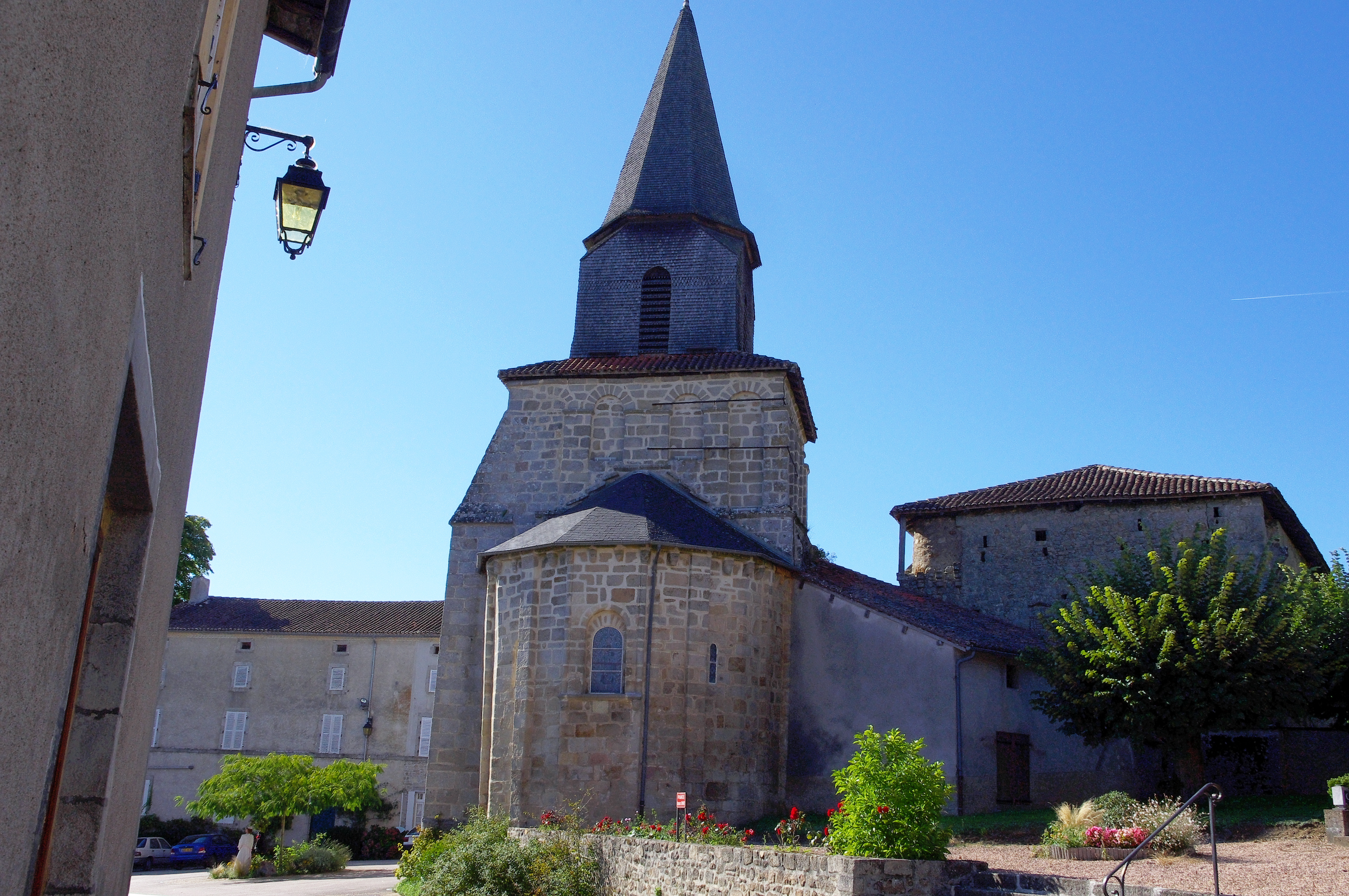
- The church in Marval

- Coat of arms
- Location of Marval
- Location within France Location within Nouvelle-Aquitaine
- Coordinates: 45°37′42″N 0°47′56″E
- Country: France
- Region: Nouvelle-Aquitaine
- Department: Haute-Vienne
- Arrondissement: Rochechouart
- Canton: Rochechouart
- Intercommunality: Ouest Limousin

Government
  - Mayor (2020–2026): Pierre Hachin
- Area^{1}: 38.50 km^{2} (14.86 sq mi)
- Highest elevation: 476 m (1,562 ft)
- Lowest elevation: 245 m (804 ft)
- Population (2023): 499
  - Density: 13.0/km^{2} (33.6/sq mi)
- Time zone: UTC+01:00 (CET)
  - Summer (DST): UTC+02:00 (CEST)
- INSEE/Postal code: 87092 /87440
- ^{1} French Land Register data, which excludes lakes, ponds, glaciers > 1 km^{2} (0.386 sq mi or 247 acres) and river estuaries.

Marval (French pronunciation: [maʁval]; Occitan: Marvau) is a commune in the Haute-Vienne department in the Nouvelle-Aquitaine region in west-central France.

Inhabitants are known as Marvalais in French.

== See also ==
- Communes of the Haute-Vienne department
