= Vayres, Haute-Vienne =

Vayres
- Commune
- Coat of arms
- Location of Vayres
- Location within France Location within Nouvelle-Aquitaine
- Coordinates: 45°45′36″N 0°48′41″E
- Country: France
- Region: Nouvelle-Aquitaine
- Department: Haute-Vienne
- Arrondissement: Rochechouart
- Canton: Rochechouart

Government
  - Mayor (2024–2026): Fabrice Pénichon
- Area^{1}: 38.13 km^{2} (14.72 sq mi)
- Highest elevation: 333 m (1,093 ft)
- Lowest elevation: 199 m (653 ft)
- Population (2023): 703
  - Density: 18.4/km^{2} (47.8/sq mi)
- Time zone: UTC+01:00 (CET)
  - Summer (DST): UTC+02:00 (CEST)
- INSEE/Postal code: 87199 /87600
- ^{1} French Land Register data, which excludes lakes, ponds, glaciers > 1 km^{2} (0.386 sq mi or 247 acres) and river estuaries.

Vayres (French pronunciation: [vɛʁ]; Occitan: Vairas) is a commune in the Haute-Vienne department, Nouvelle-Aquitaine, western France.

Inhabitants are known as Vayrois in French.

== See also ==
- Communes of the Haute-Vienne department
