= Saint-Mathieu, Haute-Vienne =

Saint-Mathieu
- Commune
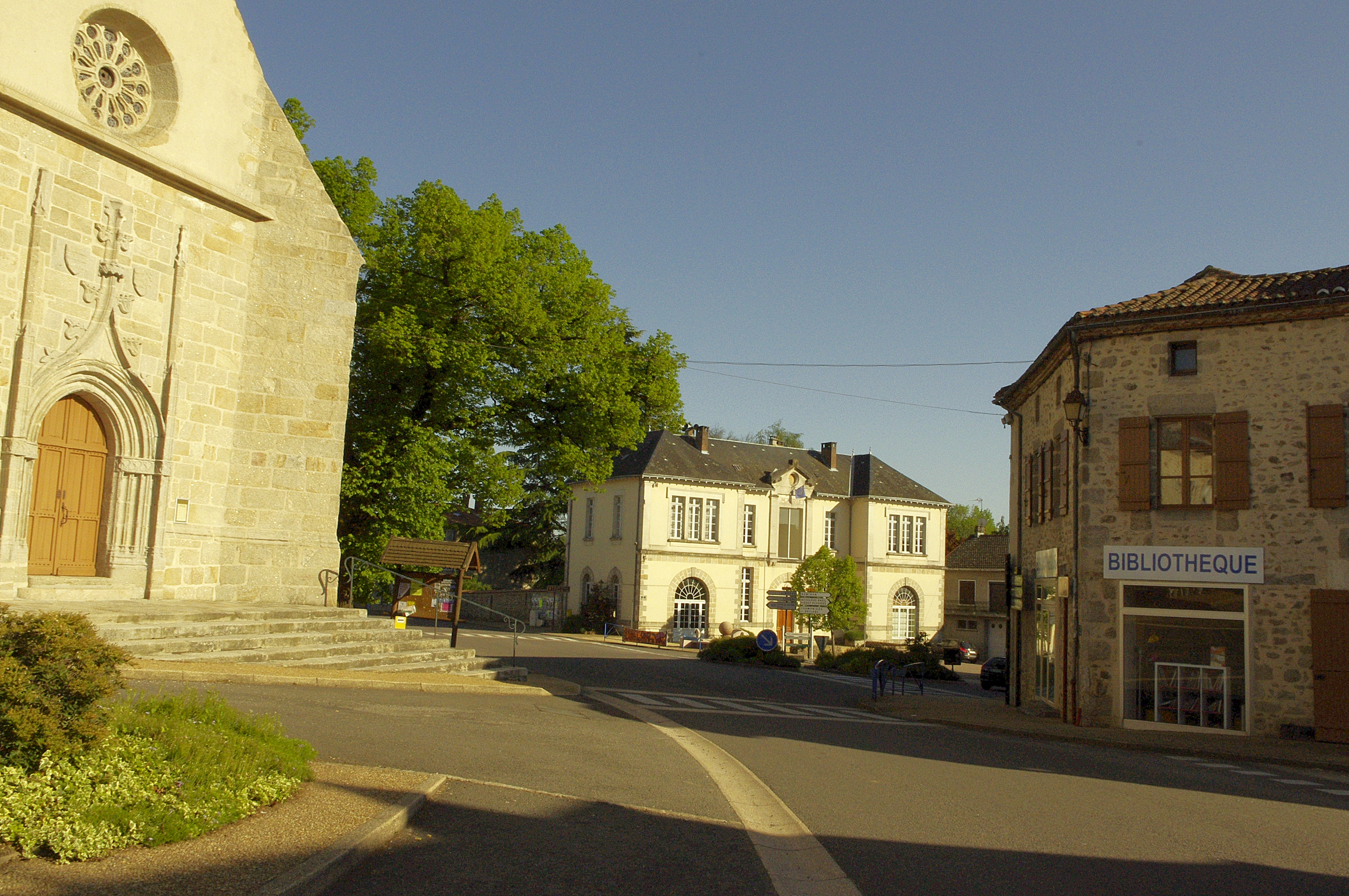
- The centre of the village with the church, the town hall and the library

- Coat of arms
- Location of Saint-Mathieu
- Location within France Location within Nouvelle-Aquitaine
- Coordinates: 45°42′27″N 0°45′34″E
- Country: France
- Region: Nouvelle-Aquitaine
- Department: Haute-Vienne
- Arrondissement: Rochechouart
- Canton: Rochechouart
- Intercommunality: CC Ouest Limousin

Government
  - Mayor (2020–2026): Agnès Varachaud
- Area^{1}: 40.39 km^{2} (15.59 sq mi)
- Highest elevation: 435 m (1,427 ft)
- Lowest elevation: 225 m (738 ft)
- Population (2023): 1,085
  - Density: 26.86/km^{2} (69.58/sq mi)
- Time zone: UTC+01:00 (CET)
  - Summer (DST): UTC+02:00 (CEST)
- INSEE/Postal code: 87168 /87440
- ^{1} French Land Register data, which excludes lakes, ponds, glaciers > 1 km^{2} (0.386 sq mi or 247 acres) and river estuaries.

Saint-Mathieu (French pronunciation: [sɛ̃ matjø]; Occitan: Samatiá) is a commune in the Haute-Vienne department in the Nouvelle-Aquitaine region in west-central France.

Inhabitants are known as Mathuséens.

== See also ==
- Communes of the Haute-Vienne department
