= Antigny =

Antigny is the name or part of the name of the following communes in France:

- Antigny, Vendée, in the Vendée department
- Antigny, Vienne, in the Vienne department
- Antigny-la-Ville, in the Côte-d'Or department
