= Nalliers =

Nalliers may refer to two communes in France:

- Nalliers, Vendée, in the Pays-de-la-Loire region
- Nalliers, Vienne, in the Poitou-Charentes region
