= Thiollet =

Thiollet is a surname of French origin.

== List of people with the surname ==
- François Thiollet (born 1975), French politician
- Jean-Pierre Thiollet (born 1956), French writer and journalist

== See also ==
- Thollet, France
