= Jouhet =

- Commune
- Location of Jouhet
- Location within France Location within Nouvelle-Aquitaine
- Coordinates: 46°29′27″N 0°50′19″E
- Country: France
- Region: Nouvelle-Aquitaine
- Department: Vienne
- Arrondissement: Montmorillon
- Canton: Montmorillon

Government
  - Mayor (2020–2026): Dominique Raban
- Area^{1}: 25.53 km^{2} (9.86 sq mi)
- Elevation: 88 m (289 ft)
- Highest elevation: 153 m (502 ft)
- Lowest elevation: 78 m (256 ft)
- Population (2023): 502
  - Density: 19.7/km^{2} (50.9/sq mi)
- Time zone: UTC+01:00 (CET)
  - Summer (DST): UTC+02:00 (CEST)
- INSEE/Postal code: 86117 /86500
- ^{1} French Land Register data, which excludes lakes, ponds, glaciers > 1 km^{2} (0.386 sq mi or 247 acres) and river estuaries.

Jouhet (French pronunciation: [ʒu.ɛ]) is a commune in the Vienne department and Nouvelle-Aquitaine region of western France.

== History ==
A 15th chapel of rest at Jouhet has 16th-century historical frescoes. On the left wall of the chapel is the legend of The Three Dead Kings. The chapel was declared of historic importance in 1908. The Three Kings' legend, which dates from the end of the 13th century shows three kings or riders meeting three corpses and realising the inevitability of death. This theme is repeated three times in the frescoes of Antigny Church.

Within the commune is the village of Rillé where the Polish underground liberation movement known as "Monika" (Polska Organizacja Walki o Niepodległość) operated. Towards the end of the war in 1944 they were very active and SOE agents landed here bringing money and supplies.

== See also ==
- Communes of the Vienne department
