= Delor =

Delor may refer to:

- Davina Delor (born 1952), French dancer and Buddhist nun
- Delor, a brand name of polychlorinated biphenyl

== See also ==
- Jacques Delors (1925–2023), President of the European Commission 1985–1995
