= Cromac =

Cromac can refer to:

- Cromac, Haute-Vienne in France
- Belfast Cromac (Northern Ireland Parliament constituency)
- Belfast Cromac (UK Parliament constituency)
