= Brigueil-le-Chantre =

- Commune
- Location of Brigueil-le-Chantre
- Location within France Location within Nouvelle-Aquitaine
- Coordinates: 46°23′48″N 1°05′19″E
- Country: France
- Region: Nouvelle-Aquitaine
- Department: Vienne
- Arrondissement: Montmorillon
- Canton: Montmorillon

Government
  - Mayor (2020–2026): Patrick Daubisse
- Area^{1}: 53.79 km^{2} (20.77 sq mi)
- Elevation: 193 m (633 ft)
- Highest elevation: 203 m (666 ft)
- Lowest elevation: 120 m (390 ft)
- Population (2023): 455
  - Density: 8.46/km^{2} (21.9/sq mi)
- Time zone: UTC+01:00 (CET)
  - Summer (DST): UTC+02:00 (CEST)
- INSEE/Postal code: 86037 /86290
- ^{1} French Land Register data, which excludes lakes, ponds, glaciers > 1 km^{2} (0.386 sq mi or 247 acres) and river estuaries.

Brigueil-le-Chantre (French pronunciation: [bʁiɡœj lə ʃɑ̃tʁ]) is a commune in the Vienne department in the Nouvelle-Aquitaine region in western France.

== Geography ==
The river Benaize forms the commune's northwestern border.

== See also ==
- Communes of the Vienne department
