= Béthines =

- Commune
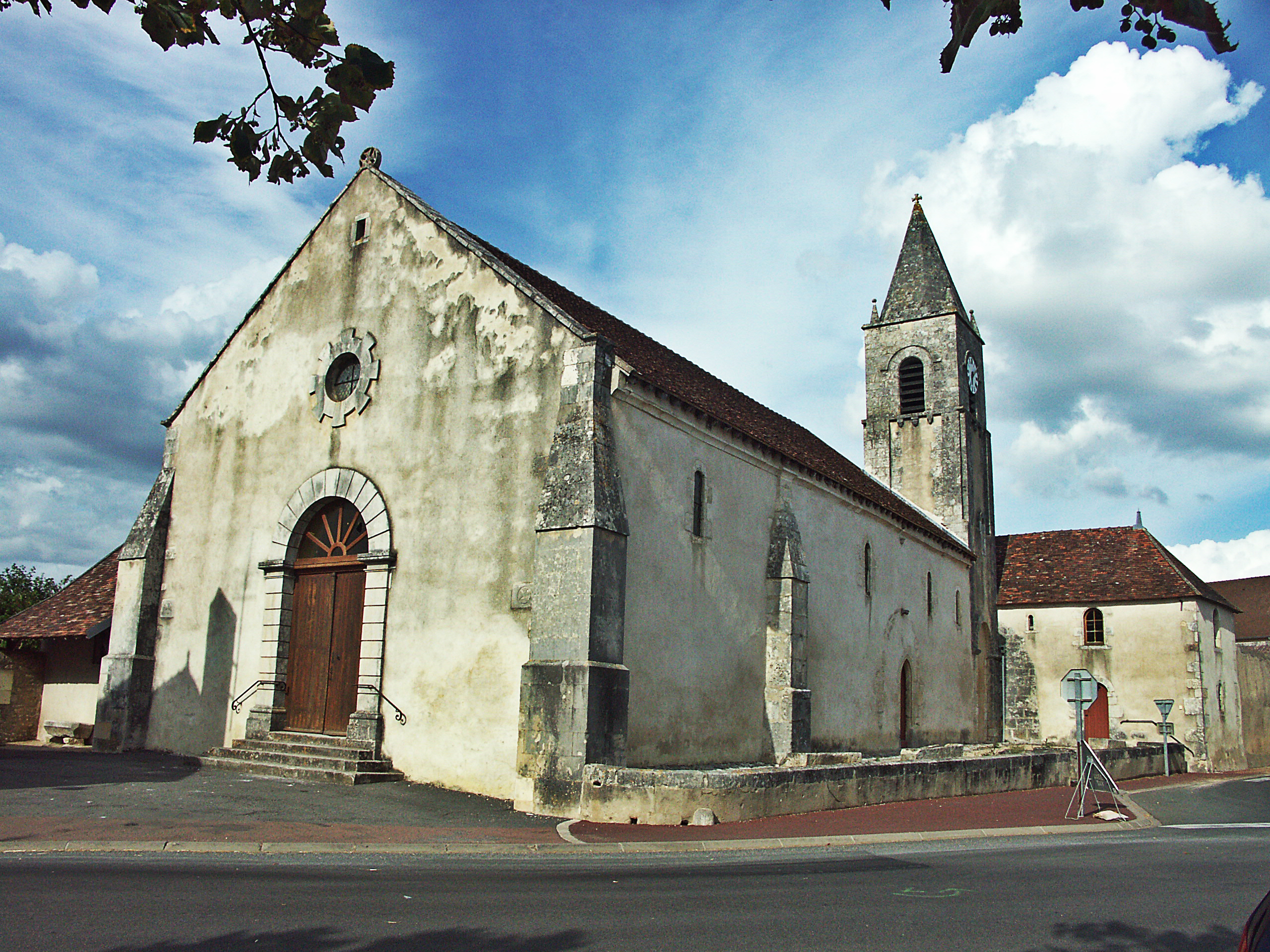
- The church in Béthines
- Location of Béthines
- Location within France Location within Nouvelle-Aquitaine
- Coordinates: 46°32′52″N 0°58′36″E
- Country: France
- Region: Nouvelle-Aquitaine
- Department: Vienne
- Arrondissement: Montmorillon
- Canton: Montmorillon

Government
  - Mayor (2020–2026): Yves Jeanneau
- Area^{1}: 37.02 km^{2} (14.29 sq mi)
- Elevation: 120 m (390 ft)
- Highest elevation: 146 m (479 ft)
- Lowest elevation: 83 m (272 ft)
- Population (2023): 467
  - Density: 12.6/km^{2} (32.7/sq mi)
- Time zone: UTC+01:00 (CET)
  - Summer (DST): UTC+02:00 (CEST)
- INSEE/Postal code: 86025 /86310
- ^{1} French Land Register data, which excludes lakes, ponds, glaciers > 1 km^{2} (0.386 sq mi or 247 acres) and river estuaries.

Béthines (French pronunciation: [betin]) is a commune in the Vienne department in the Nouvelle-Aquitaine region in western France.

== Geography ==
The village lies in the middle of the commune, on the right bank of the Salleron, which forms part of the commune's southwestern border, then flows northward through the commune.

== See also ==
- Communes of the Vienne department
