= Davina Delor =

French dancer and Buddhist nun (born 1952)

Davina Delor Gelek Drolkar
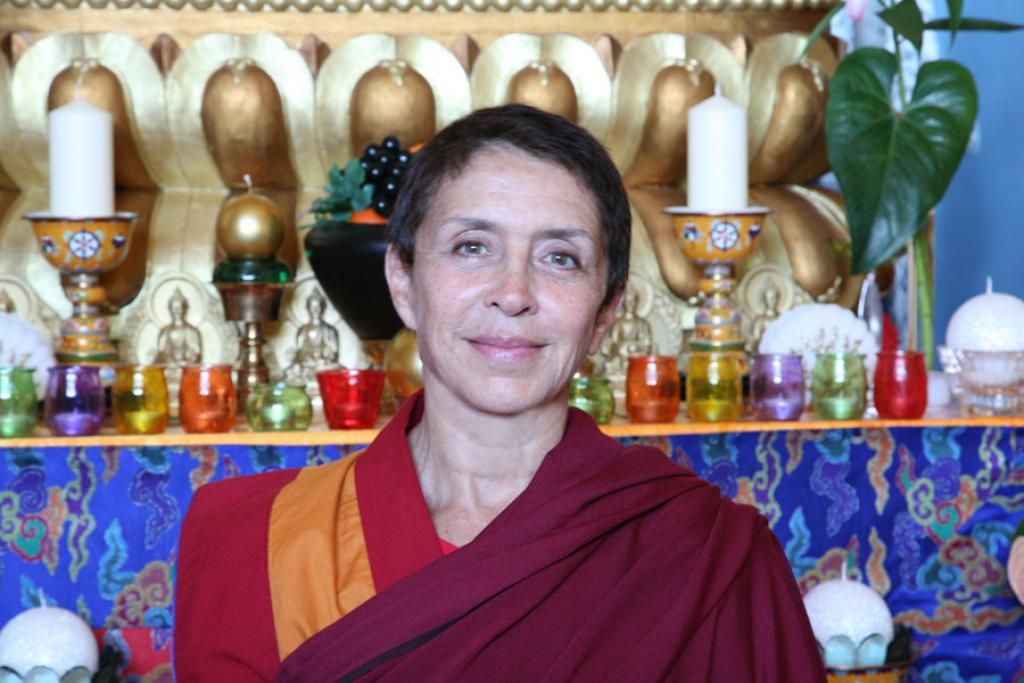
- Davina Delor in front of her Buddhist religious symbols
- Born: Martine Lahary; 1952 (age 73–74); France
- Occupations: Ballet Choreographer and TV artist turned Buddhist nun
- Known for: Gym Tonic TV show and now a Buddhist nun preaching Tibetan Buddhism
- Notable work: Le bonheur selon Bouddha (The Happiness according to Buddha)

Davina Delor (born Martine Lahary; 1952) is a French dancer, choreographer, writer, and famous for her popular TV show Gym Tonic who adopted monkhood as a Buddhist nun in 2004 after meeting the Dalai Lama. After ordination, she changed her name to Gelek Drolkar. She converted her country home at Haims into a Buddhist monastery, and along with three other nuns, teaches Buddhism to students and lay persons. She has published a number of books on yoga and Buddhism, one of which is titled Le bonheur selon Bouddha (The Happiness according to Buddha) which explains the precepts of Buddhism.

== Biography ==
Davina Delor was born in France in 1952. In her formative years in Haims, a commune in the Vienne department in the Poitou-Charentes region of western France, under the guidance of her mother, she was provided a Parisian Catholic religious education, and studied yoga and Hindu dance forms from India in addition to classical and contemporary dance. She took up a career of dance, yoga, and creative gymnastics. Together with her friend Veronique de Villele, she presented a popular TV show titled Gym Tonic from 1981 to 1987, viewed by millions, and the two were known by their first names as les filles (the girls).

Concurrent with her career, she pursued studies in traditional Chinese medicine under the direction of Dr. Trinh Quan Ngoc and became a certified acupuncturist at the Asian Acupuncture Centre in Paris. She did research in psychopathology and graduated from the College of Health-Medicine and Human Biology of Paris XIII with a degree in alcoholism and drug addiction.

Delor experienced personal tragedies. At age 17 her father committed suicide and in later years her son, aged 23, died of a ruptured aneurysm.

In 2003 Delor's career took a dramatic turn when she met the Dalai Lama, the spiritual head of Tibetan Buddhism at Bercy and was influenced by his teachings. She took her vows of celibacy at the 15th-century Golok Monastery in Tibet and became a nun in 2004 with the ordained name as Gelek Drolkar, in the Gelug order of Tibetan Buddhism.

Following her Buddhist monastic conversion, Davina reformed her 18th-century home in Haims into a monastic centre and called it the Chökor Ling in 2007, with the objective of raising funds for helping poor children of Tibet and Tibetan families residing in India. She started teaching the precepts of Tibetan Buddhism, meditation, and yoga to monks, students, and lay people, holding workshops and seminars. She is supported in this activity by three other nuns. She also built a stupa in the precincts of her 2 hectares (4.9 acres) estate. During this time, she wrote the book Le bonheur selon Bouddha (The Happiness according to Buddha) on Buddhist teachings.

== Publications ==
Delor has authored several books on yoga and the philosophy of Tibetan Buddhism. Besides her Le bonheur selon Bouddha, published in 2012, in which she says that "to be happy, we must first learn to suffer less" and to "free ourselves of our sorrows by dealing with our failings", her other books are:

- Vivre Sans Dépendance (1999)
- Qi gong, santé parfaite (1993)
- Madhevi Le Roman Du Corps (2002)
