= Pindray =

- Commune
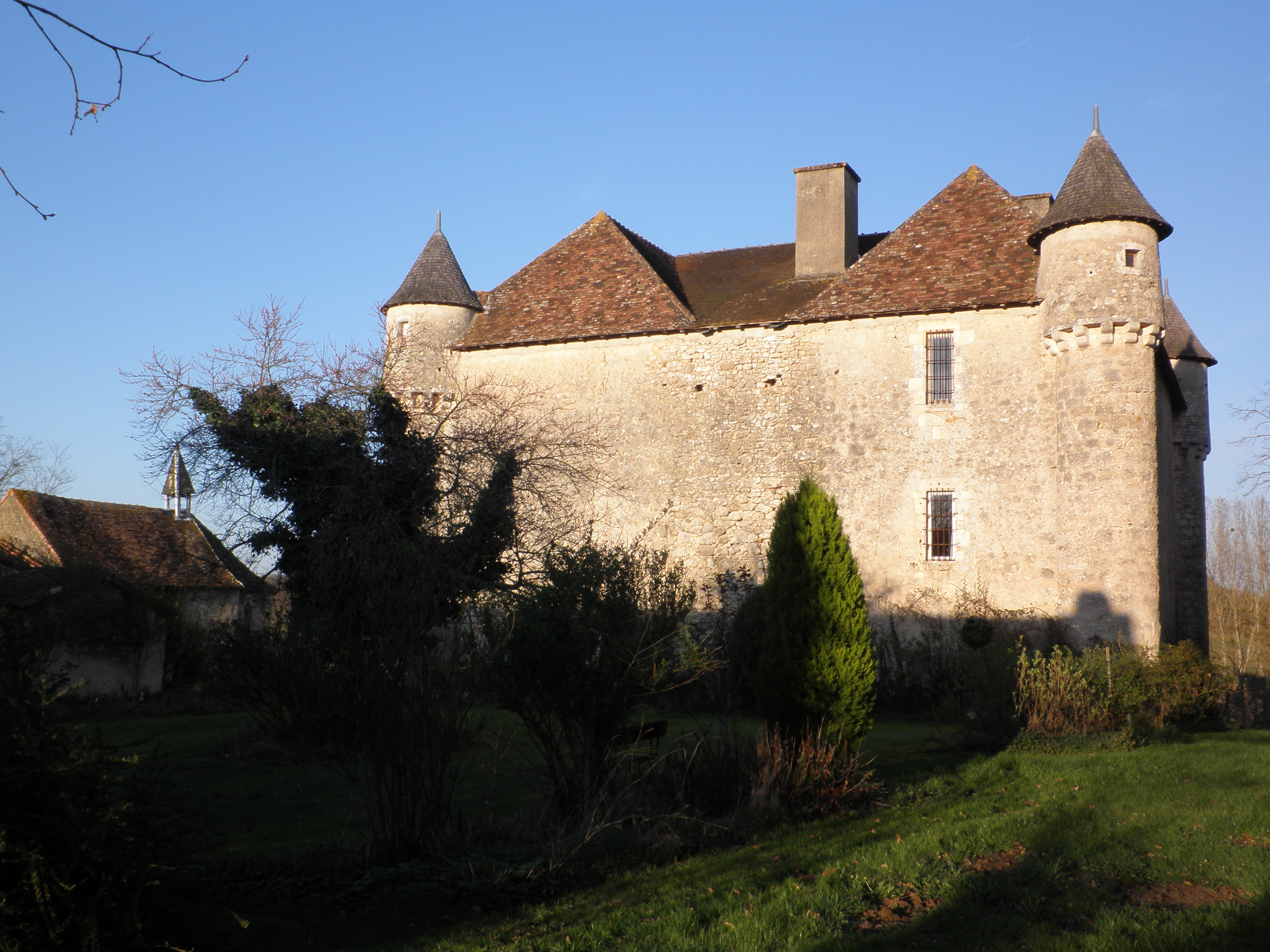
- The Château of Pruniers

- Coat of arms
- Location of Pindray
- Location within France Location within Nouvelle-Aquitaine
- Coordinates: 46°29′32″N 0°48′46″E
- Country: France
- Region: Nouvelle-Aquitaine
- Department: Vienne
- Arrondissement: Montmorillon
- Canton: Montmorillon
- Intercommunality: Vienne et Gartempe

Government
  - Mayor (2024–2026): Michel Cirot
- Area^{1}: 26.74 km^{2} (10.32 sq mi)
- Elevation: 115 m (377 ft)
- Highest elevation: 155 m (509 ft)
- Lowest elevation: 81 m (266 ft)
- Population (2023): 253
  - Density: 9.46/km^{2} (24.5/sq mi)
- Time zone: UTC+01:00 (CET)
  - Summer (DST): UTC+02:00 (CEST)
- INSEE/Postal code: 86191 /86500
- ^{1} French Land Register data, which excludes lakes, ponds, glaciers > 1 km^{2} (0.386 sq mi or 247 acres) and river estuaries.

Pindray (French pronunciation: [pɛ̃dʁɛ]) is a commune in the Vienne department in the Nouvelle-Aquitaine region in western France.

The town has a mayor. From March 2001 it was Jean-Marie Robin and in 2006 he was succeeded by Francis Servat who served until 2014.

The Chateau of Pruniers was built in the 19th century. Its dovecot and roof have been listed buildings since 1973.

== See also ==
- Communes of the Vienne department
