= Canton of Montmorillon =

Coordinates: 46.43°N 0.87°E

The canton of Montmorillon is an administrative division of the Vienne department, western France. Its borders were modified at the French canton reorganisation which came into effect in March 2015. Its seat is in Montmorillon.

It consists of the following communes:

1. Angles-sur-l'Anglin
2. Antigny
3. Béthines
4. Bourg-Archambault
5. Brigueil-le-Chantre
6. La Bussière
7. Coulonges
8. Haims
9. Jouhet
10. Journet
11. Lathus-Saint-Rémy
12. Liglet
13. Montmorillon
14. Moulismes
15. Nalliers
16. Pindray
17. Plaisance
18. La Puye
19. Saint-Germain
20. Saint-Léomer
21. Saint-Pierre-de-Maillé
22. Saint-Savin
23. Saulgé
24. Thollet
25. La Trimouille
26. Villemort
