= Ingrandes, Indre =

Ingrandes
- Commune
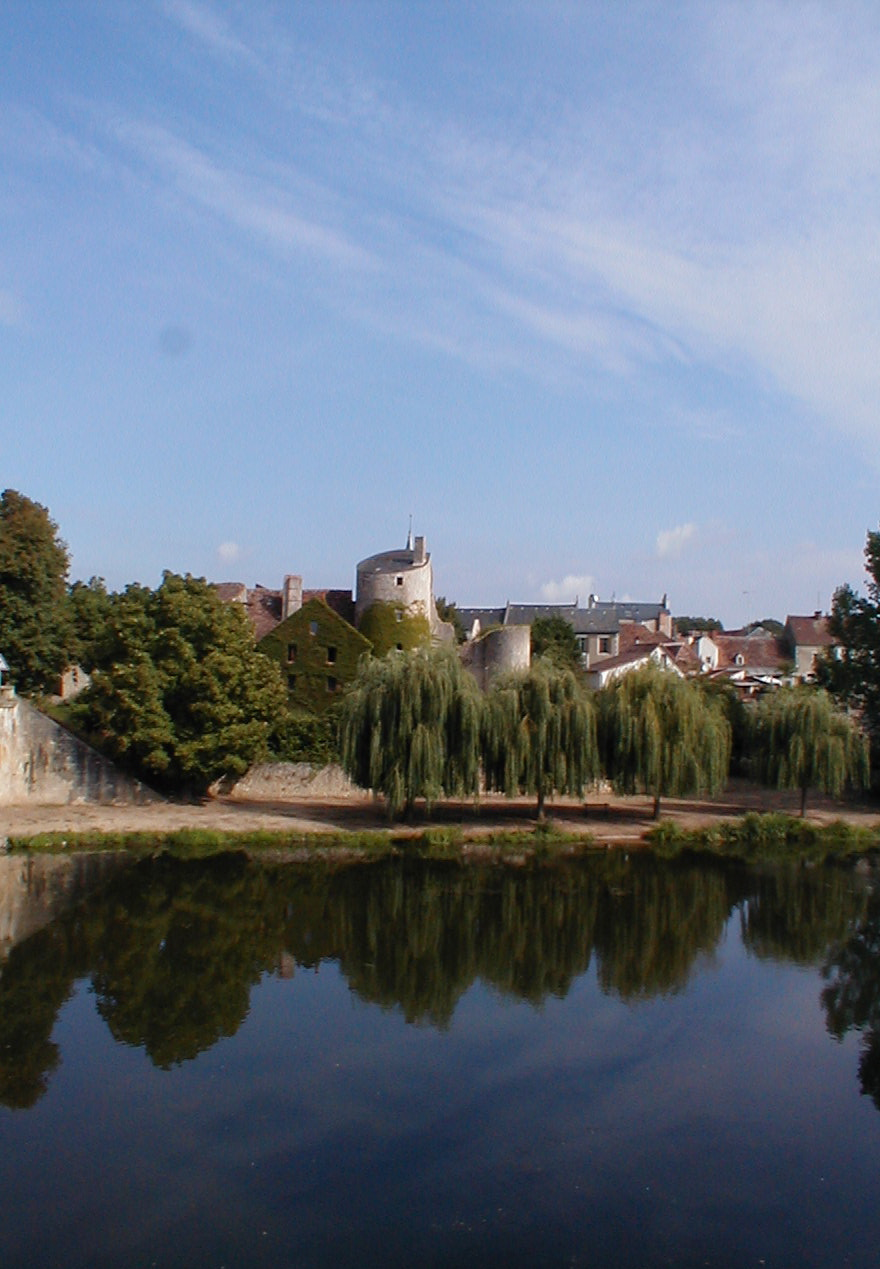
- Chateau
- Location of Ingrandes
- Location within France Location within Centre-Val de Loire
- Coordinates: 46°35′54″N 0°57′50″E
- Country: France
- Region: Centre-Val de Loire
- Department: Indre
- Arrondissement: Le Blanc
- Canton: Le Blanc
- Intercommunality: Brenne Val de Creuse

Government
  - Mayor (2022–2026): Marie-Hélene Cartier
- Area^{1}: 11.12 km^{2} (4.29 sq mi)
- Elevation: 87 m (285 ft)
- Highest elevation: 131 m (430 ft)
- Lowest elevation: 76 m (249 ft)
- Population (2023): 294
  - Density: 26.4/km^{2} (68.5/sq mi)
- Time zone: UTC+01:00 (CET)
  - Summer (DST): UTC+02:00 (CEST)
- INSEE/Postal code: 36087 /36300
- ^{1} French Land Register data, which excludes lakes, ponds, glaciers > 1 km^{2} (0.386 sq mi or 247 acres) and river estuaries.

Ingrandes (French pronunciation: [ɛ̃ɡʁɑ̃d]) is a commune in the Indre department in central France. The village is the site of the Gallic city of Pictavorum prior to the Roman Empire's domination of this part of Western Gaul (France). and called Fines later on in the roman period. The name Ingrandes comes from gallic Egoranda or Equoranda meaning frontier between regions. There are over 3 Ingrandes in the region, and over 100 towns, villages or locality called Ingrandes or other toponyms.

== Geography ==
The commune is located in the parc naturel régional de la Brenne.

The Salleron forms most of the commune's southeastern border, then flows into the Anglin. The village lies in the middle of the commune, on the right bank of the Anglin, which flows northwest through the commune.

== Population ==
Historical population
Year	Pop.	±% p.a.
1968	390	—
1975	300	−3.68%
1982	300	+0.00%
1990	310	+0.41%
1999	316	+0.21%
2007	329	+0.51%
2012	329	+0.00%
2017	317	−0.74%
2023	294	−1.25%
Source: INSEE

== See also ==
- Communes of the Indre department
