= Saint-Léomer =

- Commune
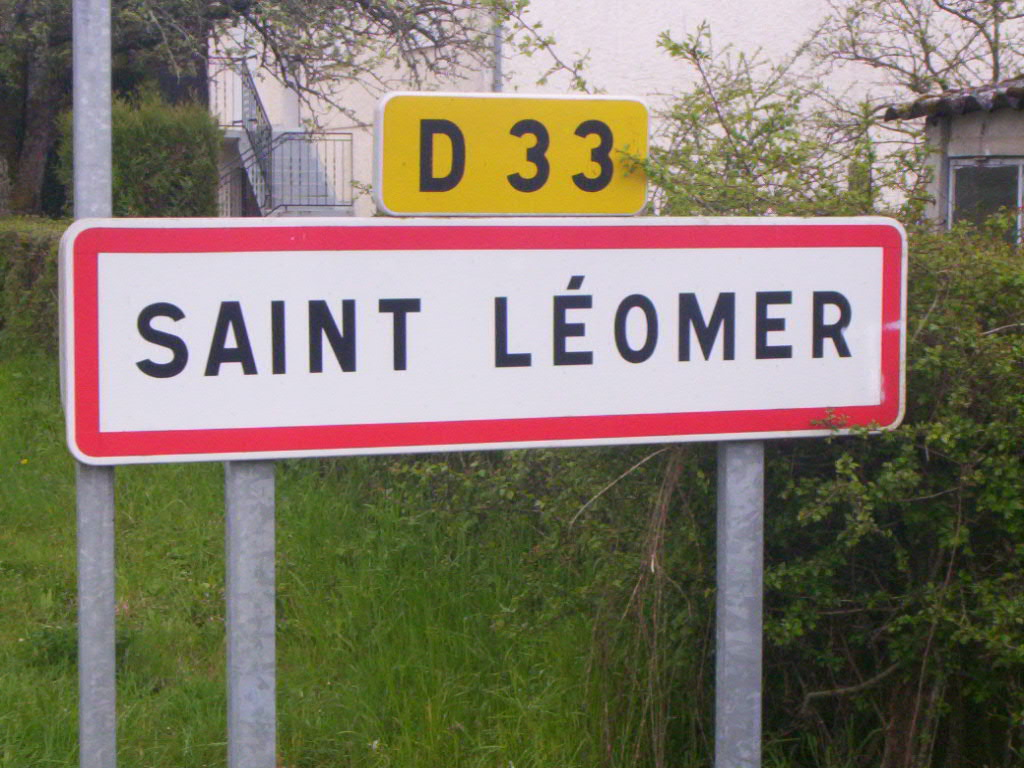
- A sign entering Saint-Léomer on the D33 road
- Location of Saint-Léomer
- Location within France Location within Nouvelle-Aquitaine
- Coordinates: 46°26′14″N 0°59′41″E
- Country: France
- Region: Nouvelle-Aquitaine
- Department: Vienne
- Arrondissement: Montmorillon
- Canton: Montmorillon

Government
  - Mayor (2020–2026): Jean-Pierre Tabuteau
- Area^{1}: 28.67 km^{2} (11.07 sq mi)
- Elevation: 142 m (466 ft)
- Highest elevation: 181 m (594 ft)
- Lowest elevation: 112 m (367 ft)
- Population (2023): 172
  - Density: 6.00/km^{2} (15.5/sq mi)
- Time zone: UTC+01:00 (CET)
  - Summer (DST): UTC+02:00 (CEST)
- INSEE/Postal code: 86230 /86290
- ^{1} French Land Register data, which excludes lakes, ponds, glaciers > 1 km^{2} (0.386 sq mi or 247 acres) and river estuaries.

Saint-Léomer is a commune in the Vienne department in the Nouvelle-Aquitaine region in western France.

== Geography ==
The Salleron flows northward through the commune.

== See also ==
- Communes of the Vienne department
