= Saint-Sulpice-les-Feuilles =

- Commune
- Coat of arms
- Location of Saint-Sulpice-les-Feuilles
- Location within France Location within Nouvelle-Aquitaine
- Coordinates: 46°19′12″N 1°22′08″E
- Country: France
- Region: Nouvelle-Aquitaine
- Department: Haute-Vienne
- Arrondissement: Bellac
- Canton: Châteauponsac

Government
  - Mayor (2020–2026): Alain Jouanny
- Area^{1}: 35.63 km^{2} (13.76 sq mi)
- Highest elevation: 364 m (1,194 ft)
- Lowest elevation: 239 m (784 ft)
- Population (2023): 1,208
  - Density: 33.90/km^{2} (87.81/sq mi)
- Time zone: UTC+01:00 (CET)
  - Summer (DST): UTC+02:00 (CEST)
- INSEE/Postal code: 87182 /87160
- ^{1} French Land Register data, which excludes lakes, ponds, glaciers > 1 km^{2} (0.386 sq mi or 247 acres) and river estuaries.

Saint-Sulpice-les-Feuilles (French pronunciation: [sɛ̃ sylpis le fœj]; Occitan: Sent Sepise lo Fòlias) is a commune in the Haute-Vienne department in the Nouvelle-Aquitaine region in west-central France.

== Geography ==
The Benaize flows through the commune and forms part of its south-eastern and western borders.

== See also ==
- Communes of the Haute-Vienne department
