= Moulismes =

- Commune
- Location of Moulismes
- Location within France Location within Nouvelle-Aquitaine
- Coordinates: 46°19′50″N 0°48′55″E
- Country: France
- Region: Nouvelle-Aquitaine
- Department: Vienne
- Arrondissement: Montmorillon
- Canton: Montmorillon

Government
  - Mayor (2020–2026): Nathalie Tabuteau
- Area^{1}: 29.06 km^{2} (11.22 sq mi)
- Elevation: 160 m (520 ft)
- Highest elevation: 206 m (676 ft)
- Lowest elevation: 108 m (354 ft)
- Population (2023): 358
  - Density: 12.3/km^{2} (31.9/sq mi)
- Time zone: UTC+01:00 (CET)
  - Summer (DST): UTC+02:00 (CEST)
- INSEE/Postal code: 86170 /86500
- ^{1} French Land Register data, which excludes lakes, ponds, glaciers > 1 km^{2} (0.386 sq mi or 247 acres) and river estuaries.

Moulismes (French pronunciation: [mulim]) is a commune in the Vienne department in the Nouvelle-Aquitaine region in western France.

== See also ==
- Communes of the Vienne department
