= Journet =

- Commune
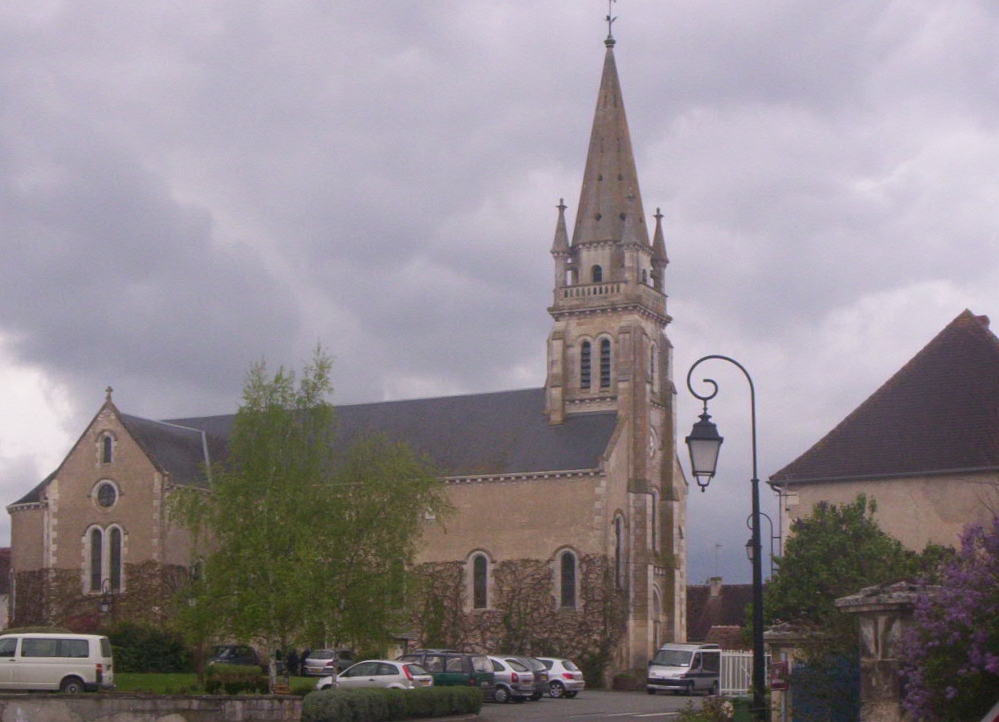
- The church in Journet
- Location of Journet
- Location within France Location within Nouvelle-Aquitaine
- Coordinates: 46°27′52″N 0°58′07″E
- Country: France
- Region: Nouvelle-Aquitaine
- Department: Vienne
- Arrondissement: Montmorillon
- Canton: Montmorillon

Government
  - Mayor (2020–2026): Sandrine Andre
- Area^{1}: 58.51 km^{2} (22.59 sq mi)
- Highest elevation: 153 m (502 ft)
- Lowest elevation: 97 m (318 ft)
- Population (2023): 366
  - Density: 6.26/km^{2} (16.2/sq mi)
- Time zone: UTC+01:00 (CET)
  - Summer (DST): UTC+02:00 (CEST)
- INSEE/Postal code: 86118 /86290
- ^{1} French Land Register data, which excludes lakes, ponds, glaciers > 1 km^{2} (0.386 sq mi or 247 acres) and river estuaries.

Journet (French pronunciation: [ʒuʁnɛ]) is a commune in the Vienne department in the Nouvelle-Aquitaine region in western France.

== Geography ==
The Salleron flows north-northwestward through the eastern part of the commune.

== History ==
After the retreat of the Germans from France in World War II, it was revealed that the French Academy of Sciences had a secret repository of scientific materials, including 100 boxes of records of the French chemist, Lavoisier, and sixty cases of rare mineral specimens. They had been held in the Chateau du Ry at Journet, near Vienne, where the Gestapo and the ERR weren't able to find them.

== See also ==
- Communes of the Vienne department
