= Liglet =

- Commune
- Coat of arms
- Location of Liglet
- Location within France Location within Nouvelle-Aquitaine
- Coordinates: 46°30′37″N 1°05′07″E
- Country: France
- Region: Nouvelle-Aquitaine
- Department: Vienne
- Arrondissement: Montmorillon
- Canton: Montmorillon
- Intercommunality: Vienne et Gartempe

Government
  - Mayor (2020–2026): Gérard Argenton
- Area^{1}: 52.53 km^{2} (20.28 sq mi)
- Elevation: 160 m (520 ft)
- Highest elevation: 169 m (554 ft)
- Lowest elevation: 87 m (285 ft)
- Population (2023): 297
  - Density: 5.65/km^{2} (14.6/sq mi)
- Demonym(s): Liglétiens, Liglétiennes
- Time zone: UTC+01:00 (CET)
  - Summer (DST): UTC+02:00 (CEST)
- INSEE/Postal code: 86132 /86290
- ^{1} French Land Register data, which excludes lakes, ponds, glaciers > 1 km^{2} (0.386 sq mi or 247 acres) and river estuaries.

Liglet (French pronunciation: [liɡlɛ]) is a commune in the Vienne department in the Nouvelle-Aquitaine region in western France.

== Geography ==
The river Benaize forms part of the commune's southern border, flows north through the commune, then forms part of the commune's northern border.

== Population ==
Historical population
Year	Pop.	±% p.a.
1968	562	—
1975	468	−2.58%
1982	424	−1.40%
1990	359	−2.06%
1999	348	−0.35%
2007	297	−1.96%
2012	318	+1.38%
2017	312	−0.38%
2023	297	−0.82%
Source: INSEE

== See also ==
- Communes of the Vienne department
