= Coulonges-les-Hérolles =

- Commune
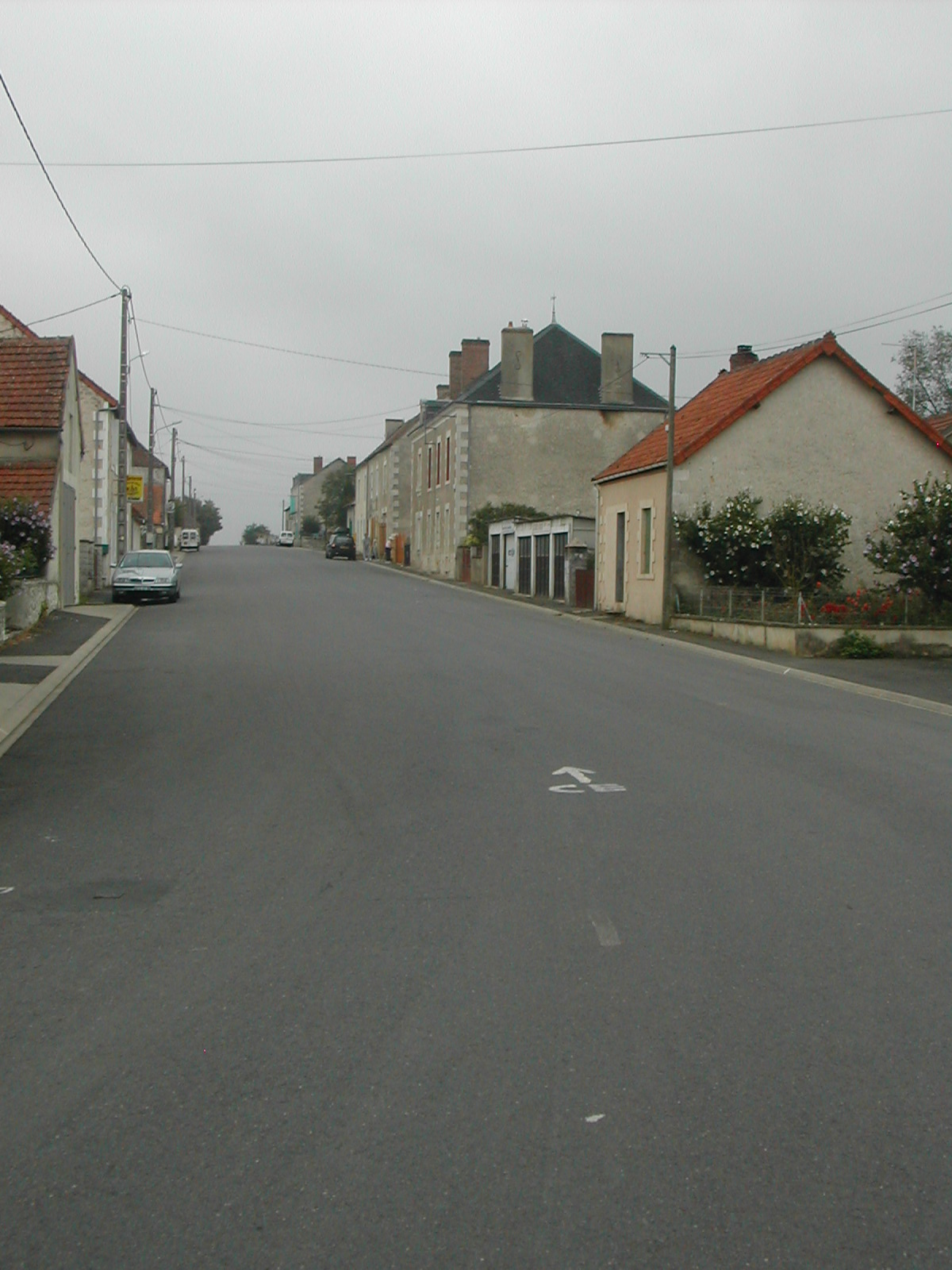
- The main street of Hérolles, in Coulonges
- Location of Coulonges-les-Hérolles
- Location within France Location within Nouvelle-Aquitaine
- Coordinates: 46°24′12″N 1°09′19″E
- Country: France
- Region: Nouvelle-Aquitaine
- Department: Vienne
- Arrondissement: Montmorillon
- Canton: Montmorillon

Government
  - Mayor (2020–2026): Jean-Charles Varescon
- Area^{1}: 18.35 km^{2} (7.08 sq mi)
- Elevation: 196 m (643 ft)
- Highest elevation: 204 m (669 ft)
- Lowest elevation: 133 m (436 ft)
- Population (2023): 230
  - Density: 13/km^{2} (32/sq mi)
- Time zone: UTC+01:00 (CET)
  - Summer (DST): UTC+02:00 (CEST)
- INSEE/Postal code: 86084 /86290
- ^{1} French Land Register data, which excludes lakes, ponds, glaciers > 1 km^{2} (0.386 sq mi or 247 acres) and river estuaries.

Coulonges-les-Hérolles (French pronunciation: [kulɔ̃ʒ lez‿eʁɔl]; before 2024: Coulonges) is a commune in the Vienne department in the Nouvelle-Aquitaine region in western France.

== Geography ==
The river Benaize forms the commune's south-western border.

== See also ==
- Communes of the Vienne department
