= Plaisance, Vienne =

Plaisance
- Commune
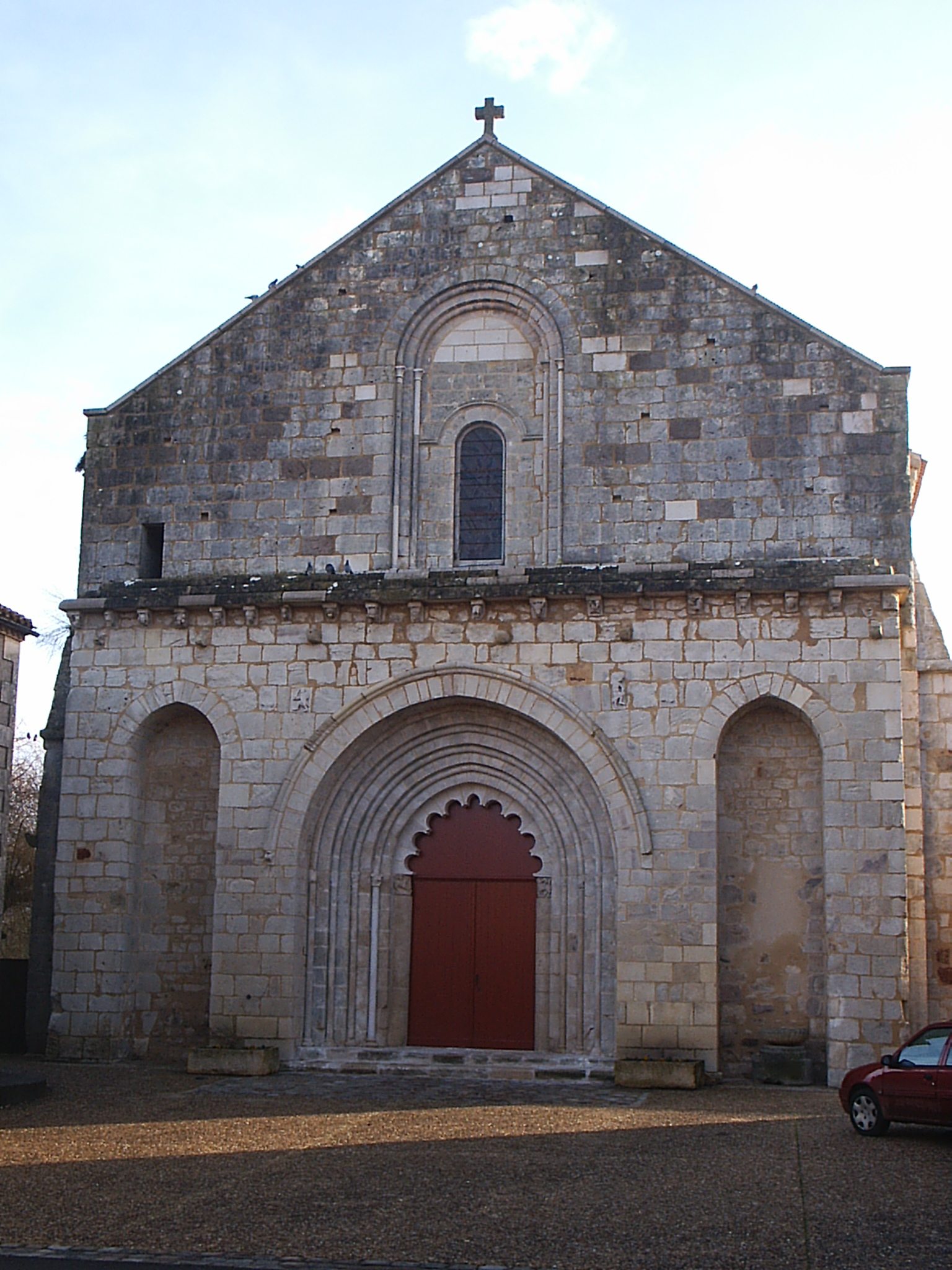
- The church of Our Lady
- Location of Plaisance
- Location within France Location within Nouvelle-Aquitaine
- Coordinates: 46°19′57″N 0°52′25″E
- Country: France
- Region: Nouvelle-Aquitaine
- Department: Vienne
- Arrondissement: Montmorillon
- Canton: Montmorillon
- Intercommunality: Vienne et Gartempe

Government
  - Mayor (2020–2026): Aurélien Tabuteau
- Area^{1}: 13.11 km^{2} (5.06 sq mi)
- Elevation: 169 m (554 ft)
- Highest elevation: 211 m (692 ft)
- Lowest elevation: 138 m (453 ft)
- Population (2023): 170
  - Density: 13/km^{2} (34/sq mi)
- Time zone: UTC+01:00 (CET)
  - Summer (DST): UTC+02:00 (CEST)
- INSEE/Postal code: 86192 /86500
- ^{1} French Land Register data, which excludes lakes, ponds, glaciers > 1 km^{2} (0.386 sq mi or 247 acres) and river estuaries.

Plaisance (French pronunciation: [plɛzɑ̃s]) is a commune in the Vienne department in the Nouvelle-Aquitaine region in central-western France.

== Population ==
Historical population
Year	Pop.	±% p.a.
1968	243	—
1975	199	−2.81%
1982	181	−1.35%
1990	183	+0.14%
1999	186	+0.18%
2007	160	−1.86%
2012	177	+2.04%
2017	166	−1.28%
2023	170	+0.40%
Source: INSEE

== See also ==
- Communes of the Vienne department
