= Saint-Germain, Vienne =

Saint-Germain
- Commune
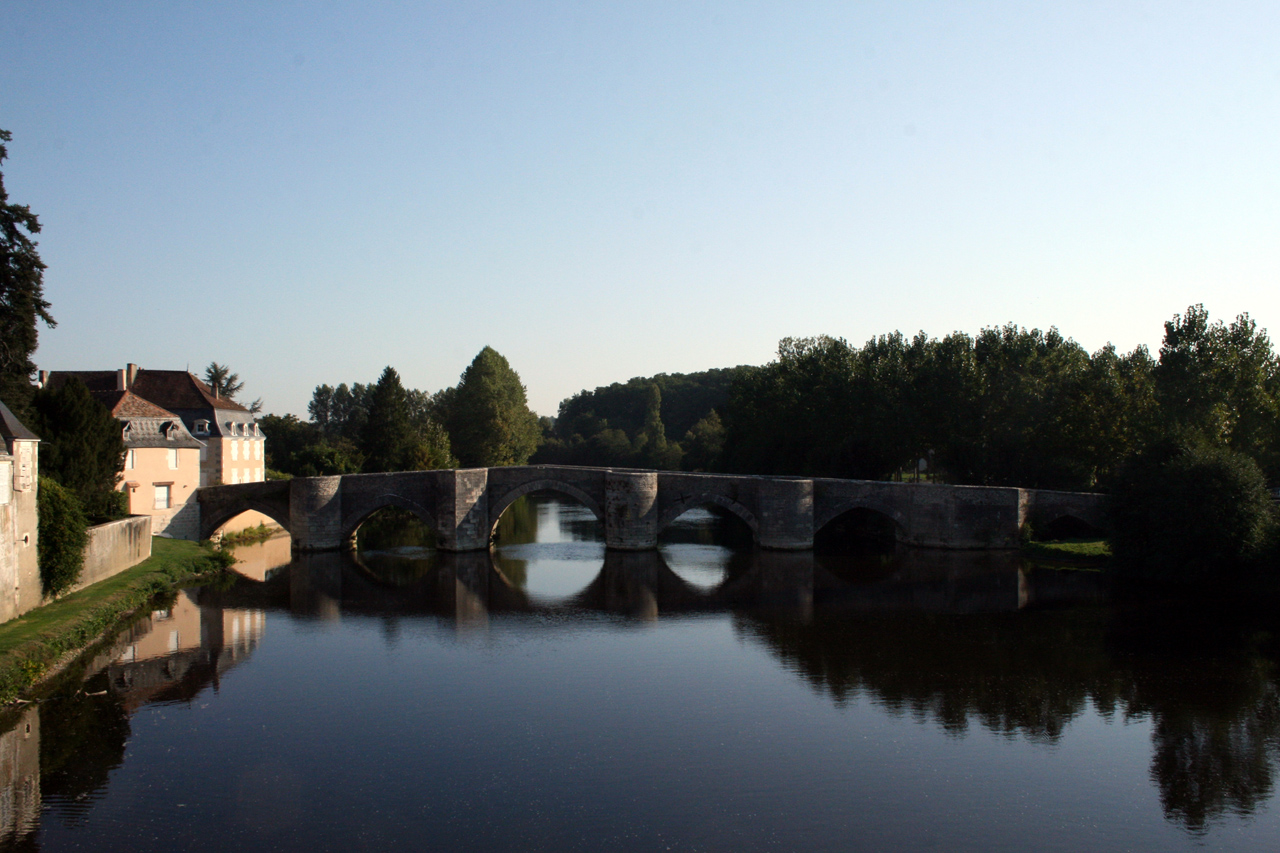
- The Gartempe river in Saint-Germain

- Coat of arms
- Location of Saint-Germain
- Location within France Location within Nouvelle-Aquitaine
- Coordinates: 46°33′52″N 0°52′29″E
- Country: France
- Region: Nouvelle-Aquitaine
- Department: Vienne
- Arrondissement: Montmorillon
- Canton: Montmorillon

Government
  - Mayor (2020–2026): Michel Porte
- Area^{1}: 20.23 km^{2} (7.81 sq mi)
- Elevation: 99 m (325 ft)
- Highest elevation: 137 m (449 ft)
- Lowest elevation: 72 m (236 ft)
- Population (2023): 886
  - Density: 43.8/km^{2} (113/sq mi)
- Time zone: UTC+01:00 (CET)
  - Summer (DST): UTC+02:00 (CEST)
- INSEE/Postal code: 86223 /86310
- ^{1} French Land Register data, which excludes lakes, ponds, glaciers > 1 km^{2} (0.386 sq mi or 247 acres) and river estuaries.

Saint-Germain (French pronunciation: [sɛ̃ ʒɛʁmɛ̃]) is a commune in the Vienne department in the Nouvelle-Aquitaine region in western France.

== See also ==
- Communes of the Vienne department
