= Roc d'Enfer, Vienne =

Site of natural beauty in Vienne, France

Roc d'Enfer
- Portes d'Enfer
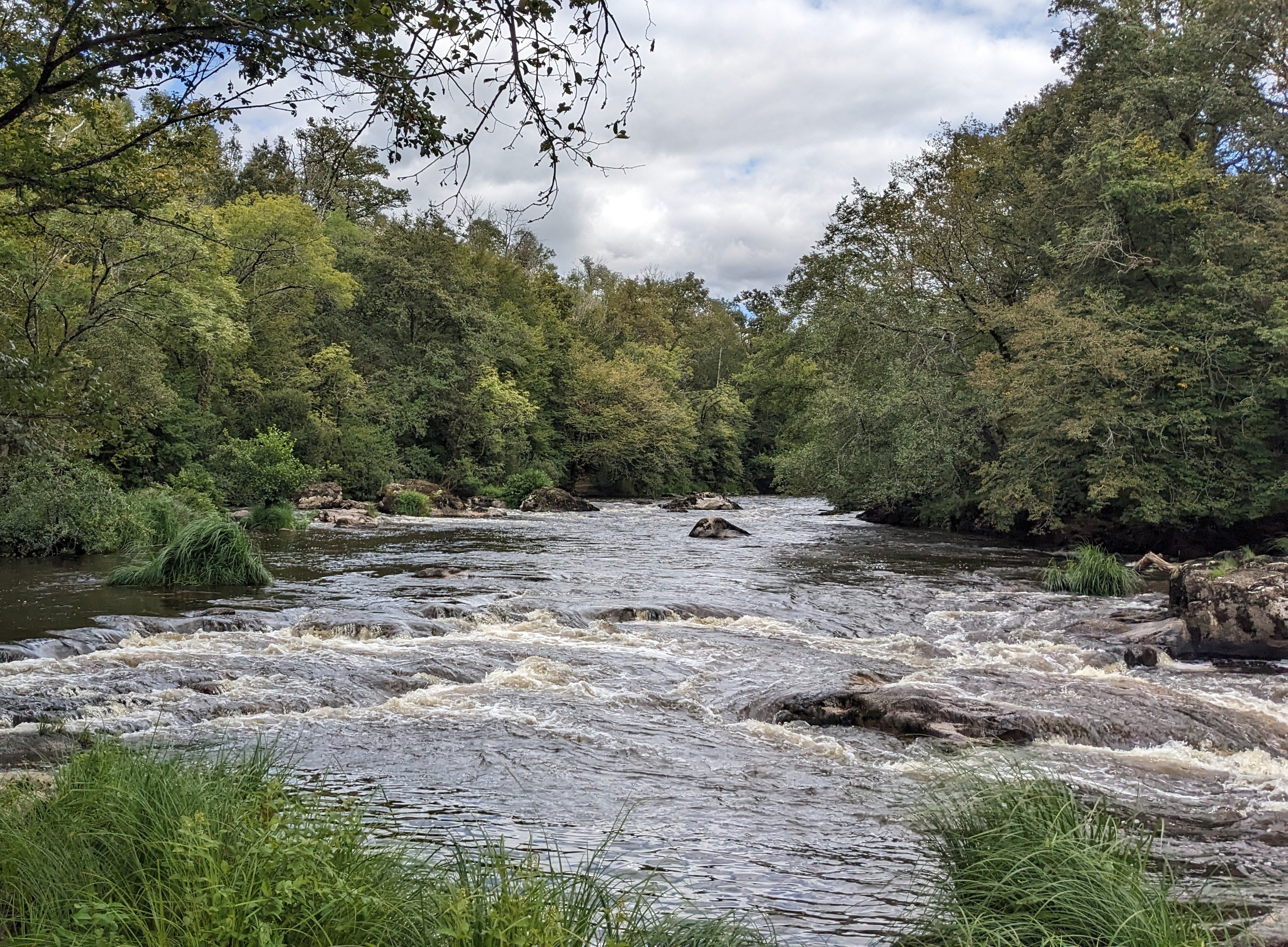
- Gartempe River at Roc d'Enfer
- Interactive map of Roc d'Enfer
- Location: Vallée de la Gartempe (transl. Gartempe Valley)
- Nearest city: Lathus-Saint-Rémy
- Area: 491 ha
- Established: 1999
- Governing body: LPO Vienne

Roc d'Enfer (transl. Rock of Hell), also known as Portes d'Enfer (transl. Gates of Hell), is a site of natural beauty on the Gartempe River in Lathus-Saint-Rémy in the Vienne region of France. It is included in the Natura 2000 network.

The site's topography features granite cliffs split by a river gorge and large rocks in the middle of the river, and it is home to a wide diversity of flora and fauna. A trail leads along the river, ending at an unfinished dam.

== Location ==
The site is in the Lathus-Saint-Rémy commune, southwest of the town, in the Vienne department in the granite region of Montmorillon on the boundary between the Massif Central and Poitou. It follows the Gartempe River, with rocky riverbanks featuring granite cliffs above the fast-flowing river and large boulders in the middle of the water. The valley was protected as a landscape in 1997.

The rock feature called the Portes d'Enfer is a 10-20 minute walk from the nearest road, the RD10, along an uneven and steep path, around 2 km from the car park. It's a further 10-minute walk to reach the unfinished dam.

The area is popular for hiking, rock-climbing and canoeing on the river, as well as observing the local nature. The nearby outdoor activities centre, CPA de Lathus, offers guided walks. Swimming is not allowed for safety reasons, although people flout the rules.

== Biodiversity ==
The Portes d'Enfer was classified as a Natura 2000 site in 1999. It is also a Special Area of Conservation and an APPB (arrêté préfectoral de protection de biotope; transl. prefectural order for biotope protection) zone. 15 protected species on the IUCN European Red List have been recorded at the site, including the Yellow-bellied Toad; the following vulnerable species: Common Atlantic salmon and the Unio crassus; and the following near-threatened species: Southern Damselfly, Gomphus graslinii, Stag Beetle, Eurasian otter, Orange-spotted Emerald. There are over 300 plant species at the site.

== The unfinished dam ==
At the northernmost point of the Roc d'Enfer site, there is an unfinished dam, also known as the breached dam. It was built in 1910 by Fernand Tribot as part of a hydroelectric plant, which was expected to produce 26 million kWh per year but was later aborted. The dam was never finished due to the outbreak of World War I.

== Legends ==
There are several local legends associated with the Roc d'Enfer.

=== God vs the Devil ===
The Devil, or a demon, is said by locals to inhabit the Roc d'Enfer, with the souls of the damned heard in the wind against the rocks. He was imprisoned beneath the river after God defeated him, with the claw marks etched into the granite rocks evidence of his resistance. He is believed by locals to only be able to venture out on Saturday nights of the full moon. Some versions of the legend have a man, sometimes described as a priest or a knight, exorcising the evil spirits or defeating the Devil and freeing the Roc d'Enfer from their influence.

One of the rocks, which appears to feature a face, is claimed to be a shepherd transformed by the devil.

=== Théoline and Gréor de Némon ===
Théoline du Cluzeau secretly met her lover, the knight Gréor de Némon, Duke of Lenest at the Roc d'Enfer during the Middle Ages. When her betrothed, Lord Alain de Mandreux, Lord of La Brissonière, discovered their romance, he set a trap for the knight at the Roc d'Enfer. Some versions of the tale instead have Théoline abducted by Alain de Mandreux. Gréor and Alain de Mandreux fought, with Alain de Mandreux as the victor. Théoline took the fatal blow meant for Gréor, and she fell into the Gartempe. Gréor killed himself from grief. They haunt the Roc d'Enfer with their moans and whispers heard as the wind through the rocks, and on their anniversary the rocks roar. Some versions of the story also have Alain being swallowed by the rocks.

=== Other legends ===
There is allegedly an inscription at the bottom of the deepest part of the river at the Roc d'Enfer that reads in Latin, "Whoever reads this message will see his end near," as the low level of water in the river signals a drought and famine.

Another legend involves two twin brothers who were monks at an abbey near the Roc d'Enfer and both had a wart on their nose. One brother was drawn from his chores by music and lights, leading him to a party at the Roc d'Enfer. The devil took a part of the monk to ensure he would return the following week; he took the monk's wart. The delighted monk explained to his jealous brother that the Devil had taken his wart. The jealous brother went to the Roc d'Enfer the following week to meet the devil. Instead of taking his wart, the Devil gave him his brother's, believing he was returning it.
