= Lathus-Saint-Rémy =

- Commune
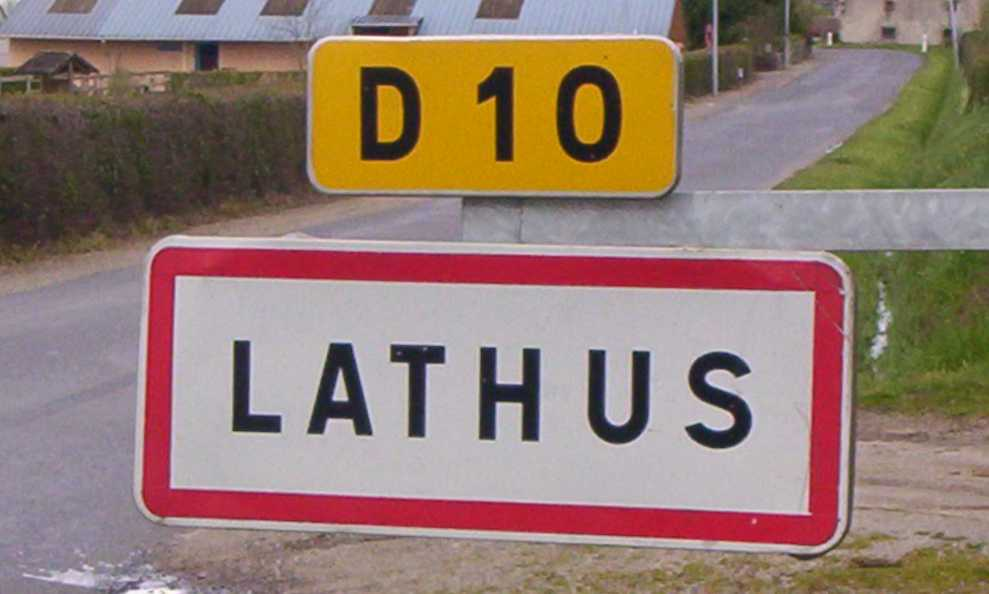
- A sign entering Lathus, on the D10 road
- Location of Lathus-Saint-Rémy
- Location within France Location within Nouvelle-Aquitaine
- Coordinates: 46°20′04″N 0°57′33″E
- Country: France
- Region: Nouvelle-Aquitaine
- Department: Vienne
- Arrondissement: Montmorillon
- Canton: Montmorillon

Government
  - Mayor (2020–2026): Antoine Selosse
- Area^{1}: 98.28 km^{2} (37.95 sq mi)
- Elevation: 180 m (590 ft)
- Highest elevation: 228 m (748 ft)
- Lowest elevation: 94 m (308 ft)
- Population (2023): 1,214
  - Density: 12.35/km^{2} (31.99/sq mi)
- Demonym(s): Lathusien, Lathusienne (French)
- Time zone: UTC+01:00 (CET)
  - Summer (DST): UTC+02:00 (CEST)
- INSEE/Postal code: 86120 /86390
- ^{1} French Land Register data, which excludes lakes, ponds, glaciers > 1 km^{2} (0.386 sq mi or 247 acres) and river estuaries.

Lathus-Saint-Rémy (French pronunciation: [latys sɛ̃ ʁemi]), commonly known as Lathus, is a commune in the Vienne department, and the region of Nouvelle-Aquitaine (formerly Poitou-Charentes), western France.

== Geography ==
The Salleron forms most of the commune's eastern border, and the Gartempe forms part of the north-western border. The commune contains the Roc d'Enfer area of natural beauty.

== See also ==
- Communes of the Vienne department
