= Benaize =

River in France

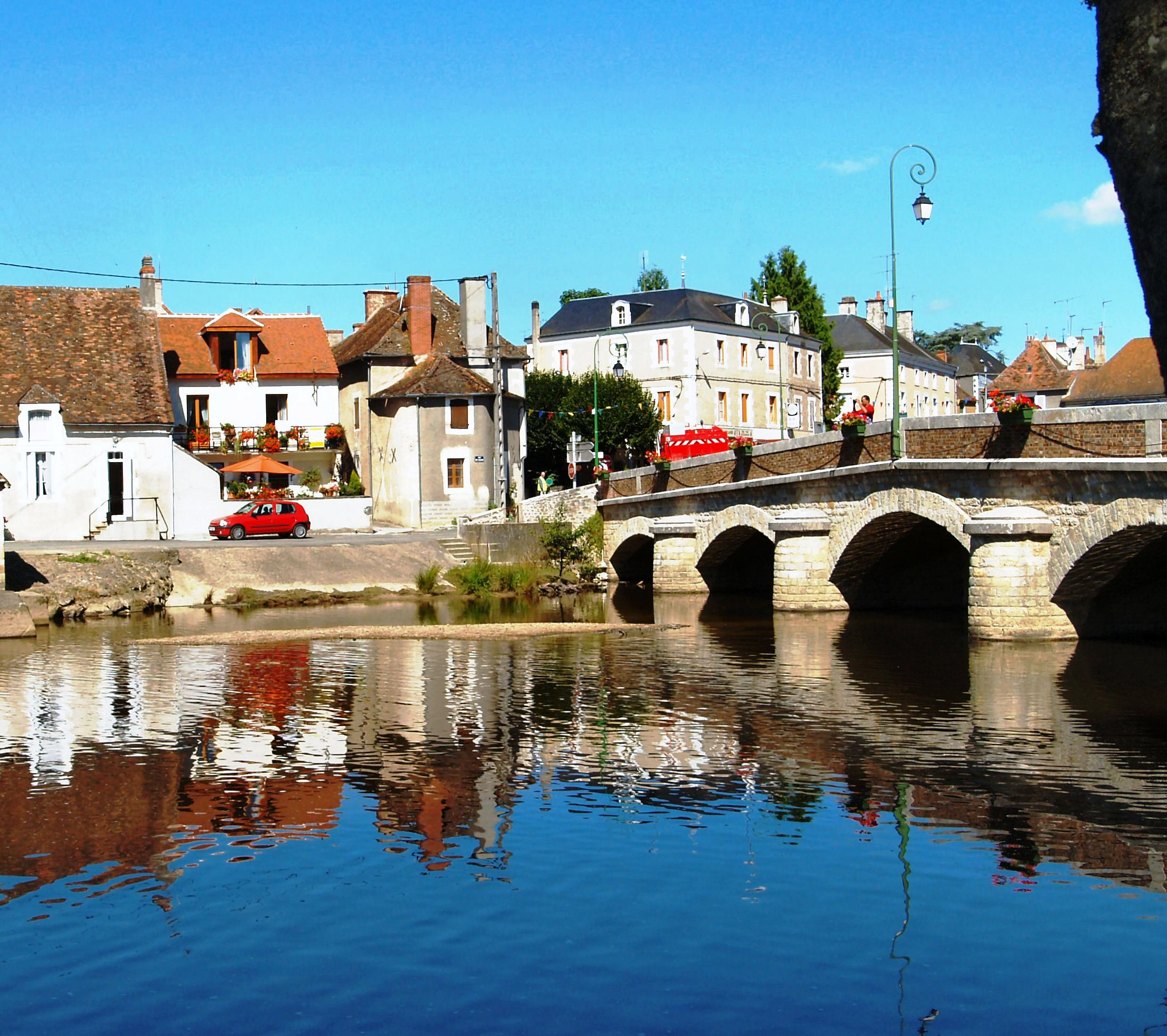
- The Benaize at La Trimouille

- Location within France Location within Nouvelle-Aquitaine

Location
- Country: France

Physical characteristics
- Source
  - location: La Souterraine
  - coordinates: 46°14′43″N 01°27′46″E
  - elevation: 385 m (1,263 ft)
- Mouth
  - location: Anglin
  - coordinates: 46°34′26″N 01°04′06″E
  - elevation: 85 m (279 ft)
- Length: 79 km (49 mi)
- Basin size: 582 km^{2} (225 sq mi)
- Discharge
  - average: 5 m^{3}/s (180 cu ft/s)

Basin features
- Progression: Anglin→ Gartempe→ Creuse→ Vienne→ Loire→ Atlantic Ocean

The Benaize (French pronunciation: [bənɛz]; Occitan: Benesa, Beneisa or Benaisa) is a 79-kilometre (49 mi) long river in the Creuse, Haute-Vienne, Vienne and Indre departments, central France. Its source is near La Souterraine. It flows generally northwest. It is a left tributary of the Anglin, into which it flows north of Saint-Hilaire-sur-Benaize.

== Departments and communes along its course ==
This list is ordered from source to mouth:

- Creuse: La Souterraine
- Haute-Vienne: Arnac-la-Poste
- Creuse: Vareilles
- Haute-Vienne: Saint-Sulpice-les-Feuilles, Mailhac-sur-Benaize, Cromac, Jouac, Saint-Martin-le-Mault
- Indre: Bonneuil, Tilly
- Haute-Vienne: Lussac-les-Églises
- Vienne: Coulonges, Brigueil-le-Chantre, Thollet La Trimouille Liglet
- Indre: Saint-Hilaire-sur-Benaize
