= Salleron =

River in central France

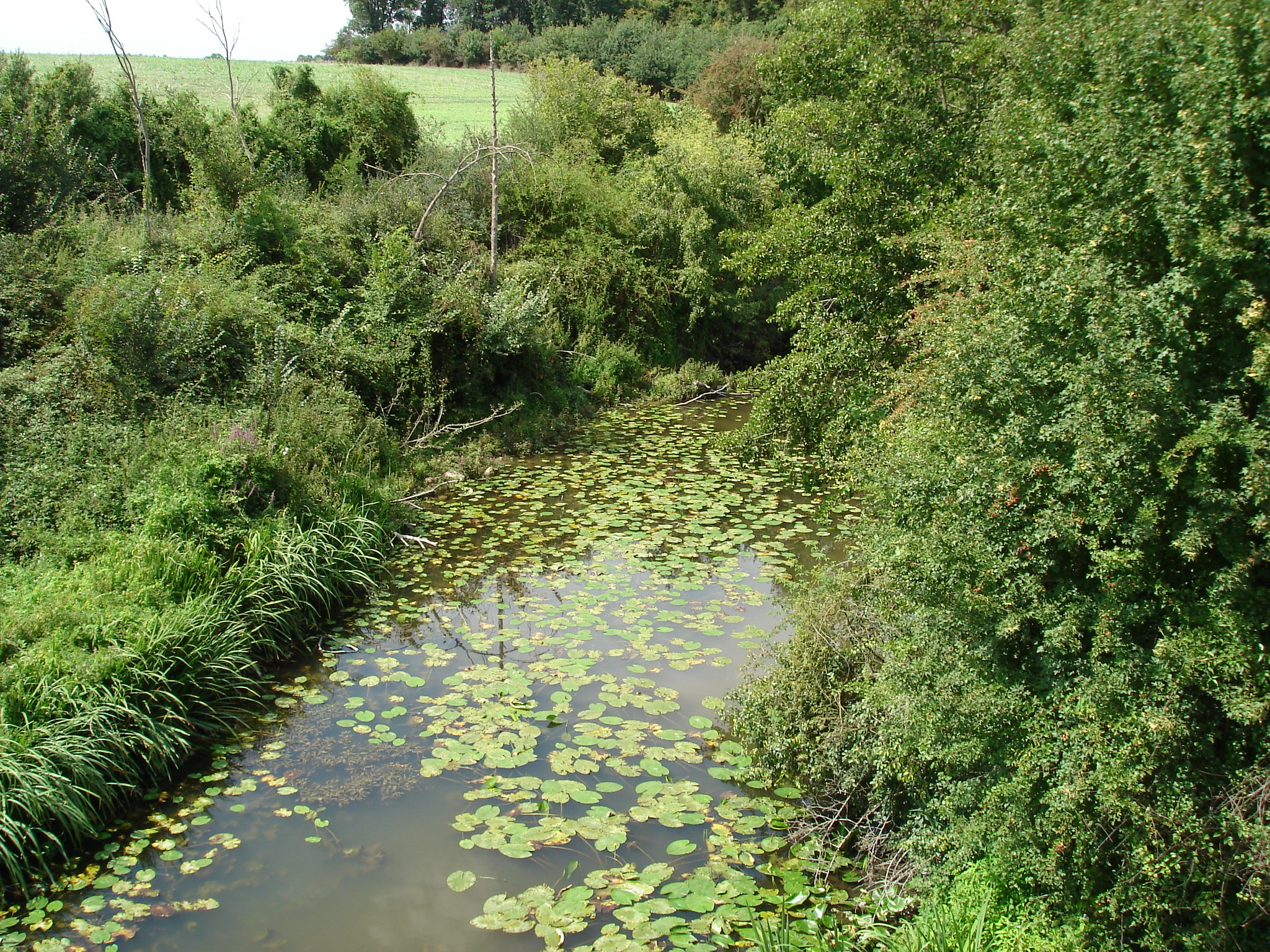

- Location within France Location within Nouvelle-Aquitaine

Location
- Country: France

Physical characteristics
- Source
  - location: Azat-le-Ris
  - coordinates: 46°17′15″N 01°02′11″E
  - elevation: 220 m (720 ft)
- Mouth
  - location: Anglin
  - coordinates: 46°35′47″N 00°58′22″E
  - elevation: 78 m (256 ft)
- Length: 51.7 km (32.1 mi)
- Basin size: 150 km^{2} (58 sq mi)
- Discharge
  - average: 0.917 m^{3}/s (32.4 cu ft/s)

Basin features
- Progression: Anglin→ Gartempe→ Creuse→ Vienne→ Loire→ Atlantic Ocean

The Salleron (French: le Salleron) is a 51.7-kilometre (32.1 mi) long river in the Haute-Vienne, Vienne and Indre departments in central France. Its source is several small streams which converge in a pond at Azat-le-Ris. It flows generally north. It is a left tributary of the Anglin, into which it flows between Concremiers and Ingrandes.

== Departments and communes along its course ==
This list is ordered from source to mouth:

- Haute-Vienne: Azat-le-Ris
- Vienne: Lathus-Saint-Rémy, Bourg-Archambault, Saint-Léomer, Journet, Béthines, Haims
- Indre: Concremiers, Ingrandes
