= Bourg-Archambault =

- Commune
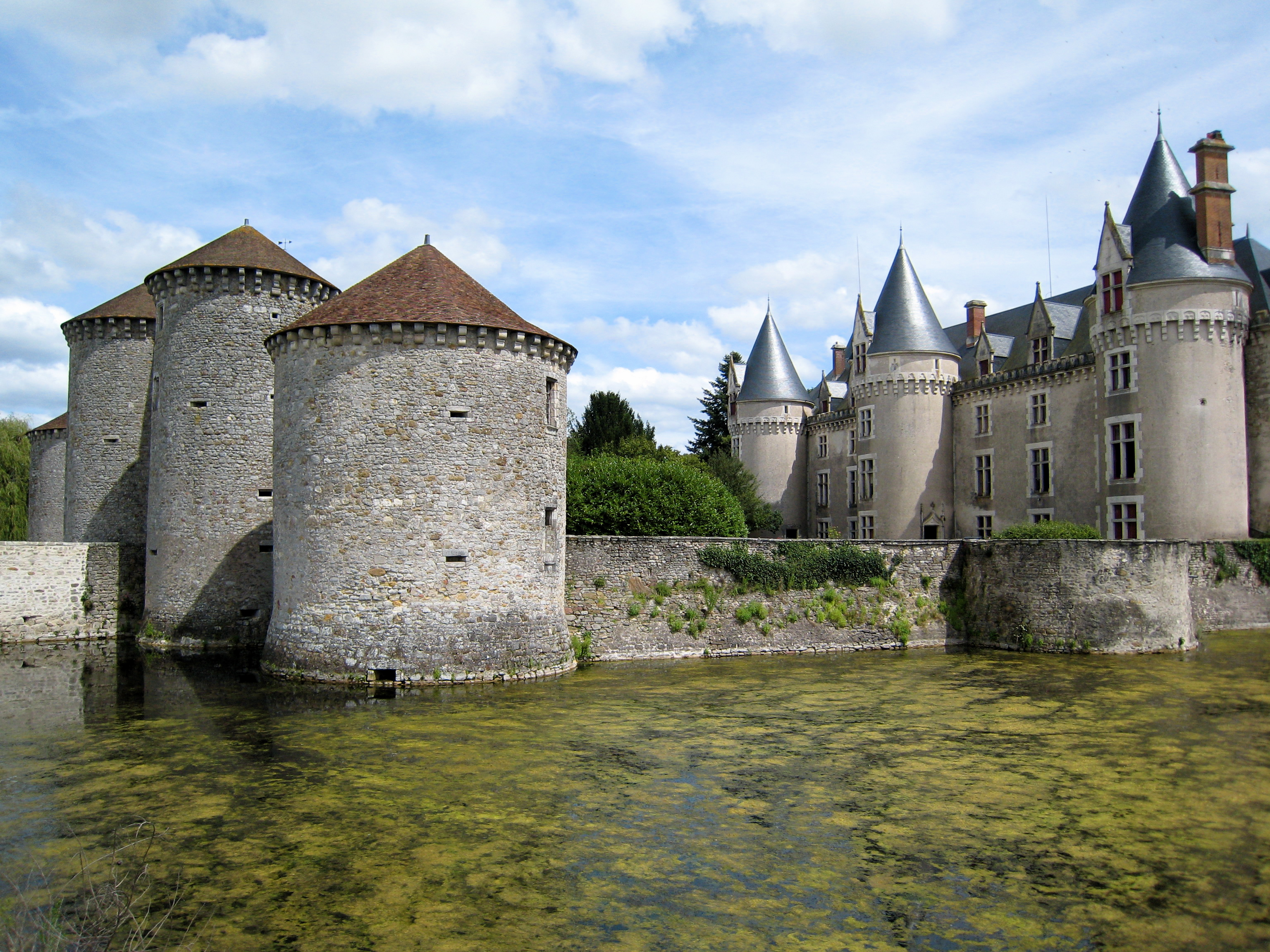
- The Chateau of Bourg-Archambault
- Location of Bourg-Archambault
- Location within France Location within Nouvelle-Aquitaine
- Coordinates: 46°23′39″N 1°00′15″E
- Country: France
- Region: Nouvelle-Aquitaine
- Department: Vienne
- Arrondissement: Montmorillon
- Canton: Montmorillon

Government
  - Mayor (2020–2026): Bernard Richefort
- Area^{1}: 24.33 km^{2} (9.39 sq mi)
- Elevation: 206 m (676 ft)
- Highest elevation: 201 m (659 ft)
- Lowest elevation: 123 m (404 ft)
- Population (2023): 170
  - Density: 7.0/km^{2} (18/sq mi)
- Time zone: UTC+01:00 (CET)
  - Summer (DST): UTC+02:00 (CEST)
- INSEE/Postal code: 86035 /86390
- ^{1} French Land Register data, which excludes lakes, ponds, glaciers > 1 km^{2} (0.386 sq mi or 247 acres) and river estuaries.

Bourg-Archambault (French pronunciation: [buʁ aʁʃɑ̃bo]) is a commune in the Vienne department in the Nouvelle-Aquitaine region in western France.

Bourg-Archambault has a privately owned chateau of special architectural interest: consisting of a four turreted 'keep' style building which was renovated during 2003: surrounded by a moat and having an entrance bridge and what appears to be a drawbridge tower

== Geography ==
The Salleron forms parts of the commune's western border, then flows northward through its northern part.

== See also ==
- Communes of the Vienne department
