= Jouac =

- Commune
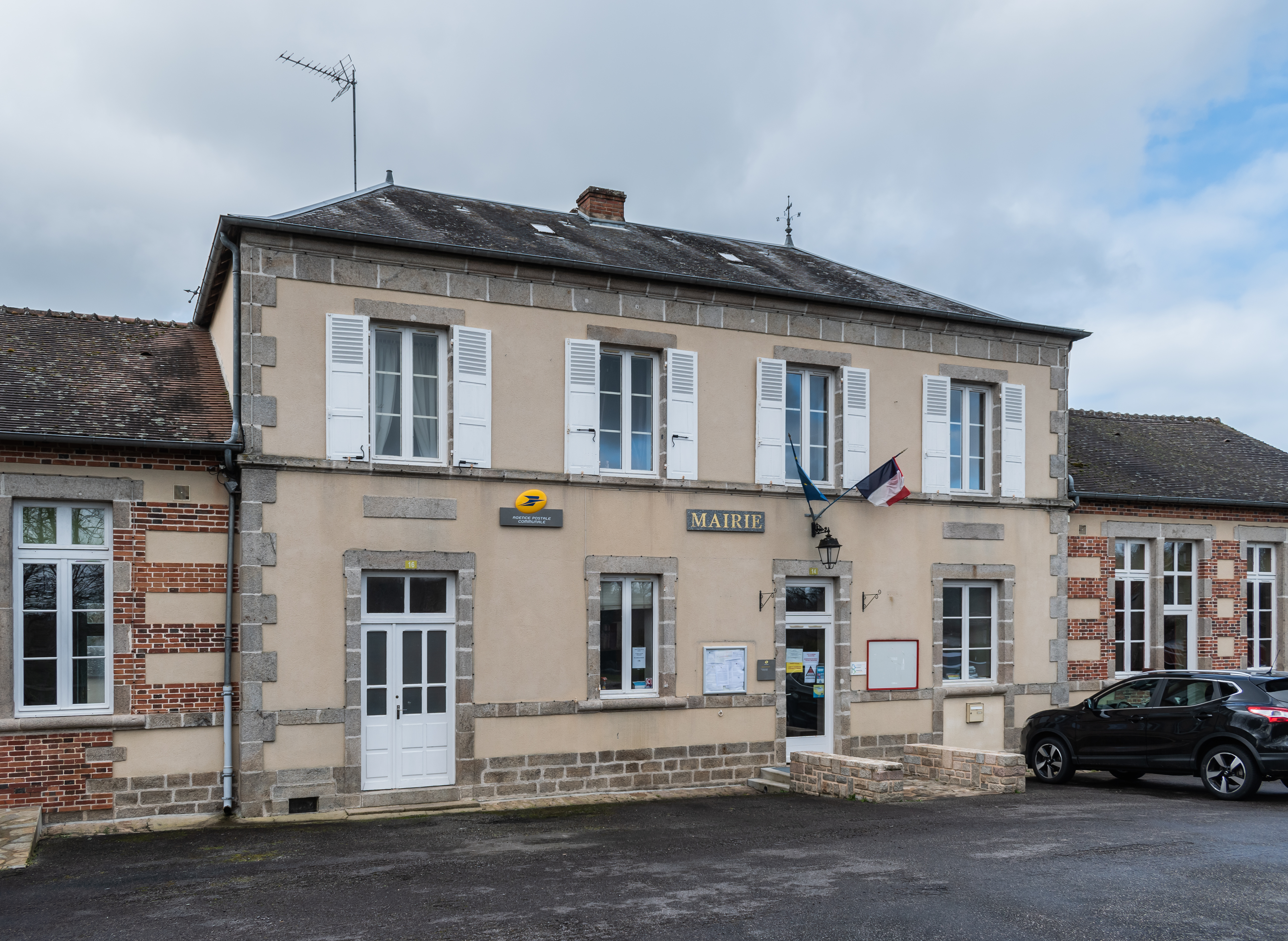
- Town hall of Jouac

- Coat of arms
- Location of Jouac
- Location within France Location within Nouvelle-Aquitaine
- Coordinates: 46°21′17″N 1°15′43″E
- Country: France
- Region: Nouvelle-Aquitaine
- Department: Haute-Vienne
- Arrondissement: Bellac
- Canton: Châteauponsac
- Intercommunality: Haut Limousin en Marche

Government
  - Mayor (2020–2026): Michel Boux
- Area^{1}: 20.31 km^{2} (7.84 sq mi)
- Highest elevation: 271 m (889 ft)
- Lowest elevation: 170 m (560 ft)
- Population (2023): 197
  - Density: 9.70/km^{2} (25.1/sq mi)
- Time zone: UTC+01:00 (CET)
  - Summer (DST): UTC+02:00 (CEST)
- INSEE/Postal code: 87080 /87890
- ^{1} French Land Register data, which excludes lakes, ponds, glaciers > 1 km^{2} (0.386 sq mi or 247 acres) and river estuaries.

Jouac (French pronunciation: [ʒwak]; Occitan: Joac) is a commune in the Haute-Vienne department in the Nouvelle-Aquitaine region in west-central France.

== Geography ==
The river Benaize forms part of the commune's eastern border, flows through the commune, crossing the village of Jouac, then forms part of the commune's north-western border.

Inhabitants are known as Jouacais in French.

== See also ==
- Communes of the Haute-Vienne department
