= Villemort =

- Commune
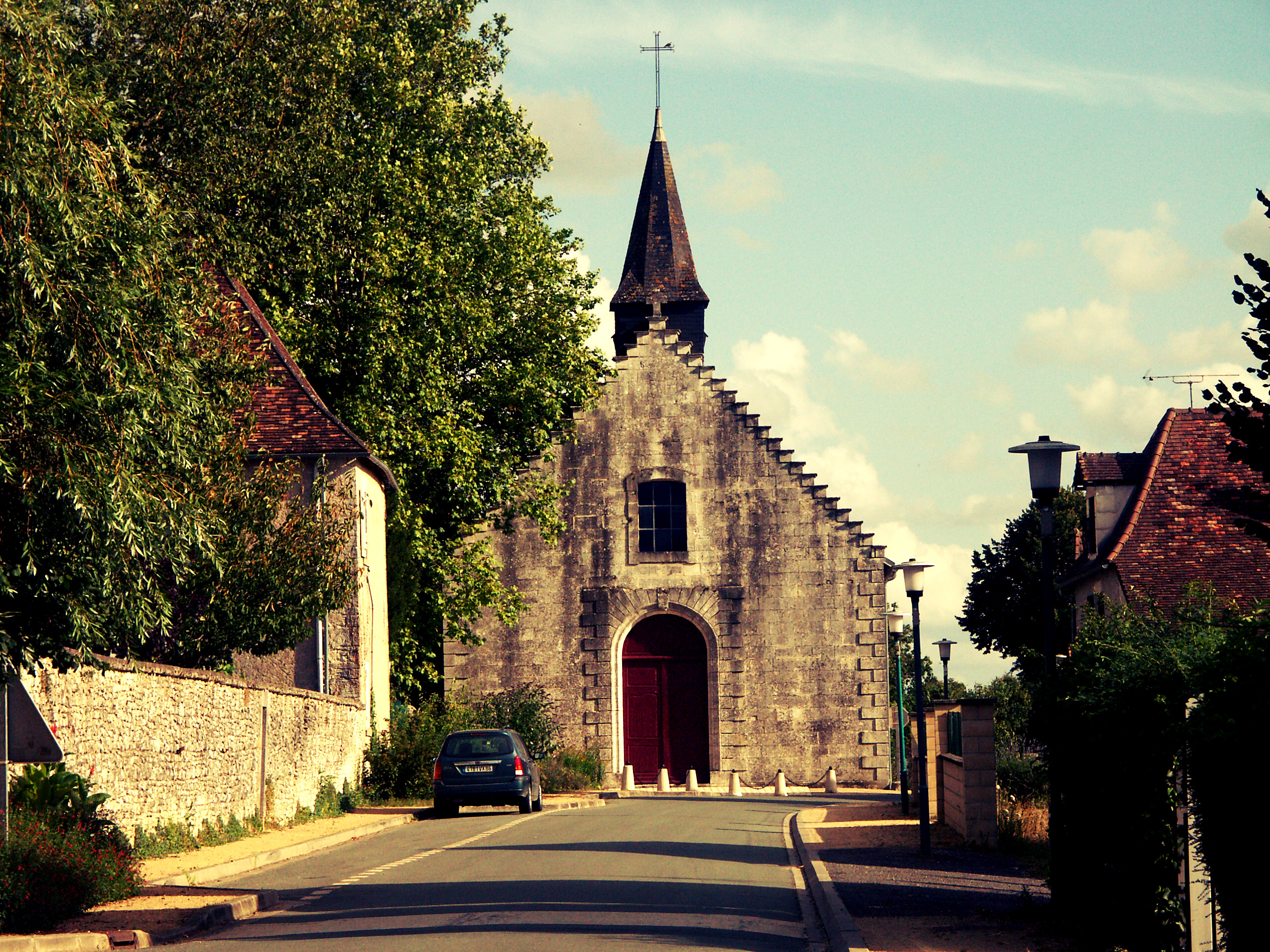
- The church in Villemort
- Location of Villemort
- Location within France Location within Nouvelle-Aquitaine
- Coordinates: 46°33′08″N 0°55′23″E
- Country: France
- Region: Nouvelle-Aquitaine
- Department: Vienne
- Arrondissement: Montmorillon
- Canton: Montmorillon

Government
  - Mayor (2020–2026): Joachim Ganachaud
- Area^{1}: 4.42 km^{2} (1.71 sq mi)
- Elevation: 131 m (430 ft)
- Highest elevation: 136 m (446 ft)
- Lowest elevation: 107 m (351 ft)
- Population (2023): 100
  - Density: 23/km^{2} (59/sq mi)
- Time zone: UTC+01:00 (CET)
  - Summer (DST): UTC+02:00 (CEST)
- INSEE/Postal code: 86291 /86310
- ^{1} French Land Register data, which excludes lakes, ponds, glaciers > 1 km^{2} (0.386 sq mi or 247 acres) and river estuaries.

Villemort (French pronunciation: [vilmɔʁ]) is a commune in the Vienne department in the Nouvelle-Aquitaine region in western France. It is part of the canton of Montmorillon and of the arrondissement of Montmorillon.

== See also ==
- Communes of the Vienne department
