= Saulgé =

- Commune
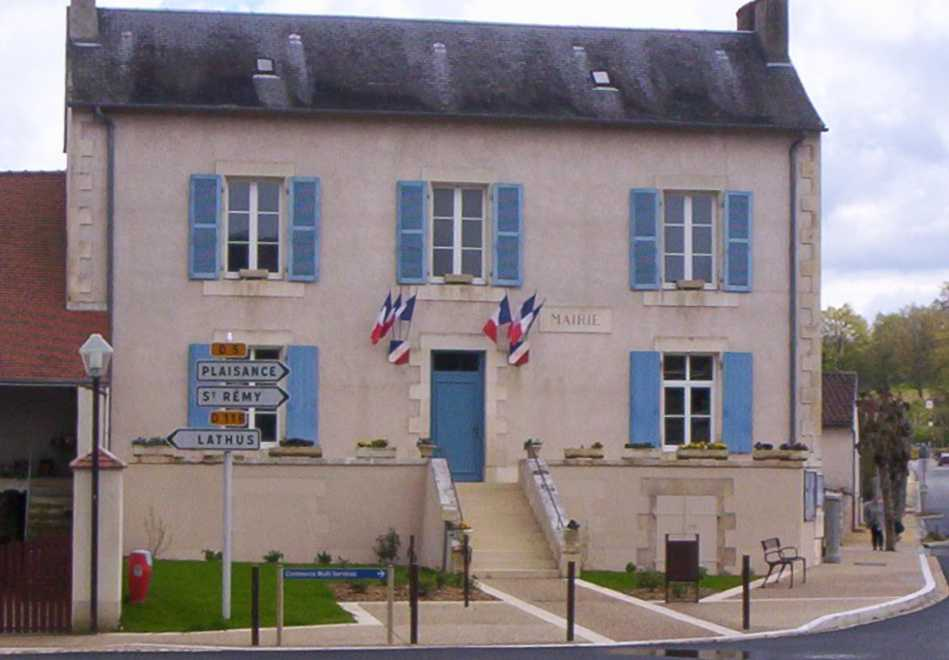
- Town hall
- Location of Saulgé
- Location within France Location within Nouvelle-Aquitaine
- Coordinates: 46°22′43″N 0°52′35″E
- Country: France
- Region: Nouvelle-Aquitaine
- Department: Vienne
- Arrondissement: Montmorillon
- Canton: Montmorillon

Government
  - Mayor (2020–2026): Bruno Puydupin
- Area^{1}: 62.31 km^{2} (24.06 sq mi)
- Elevation: 100 m (330 ft)
- Highest elevation: 202 m (663 ft)
- Lowest elevation: 87 m (285 ft)
- Population (2023): 1,011
  - Density: 16.23/km^{2} (42.02/sq mi)
- Time zone: UTC+01:00 (CET)
  - Summer (DST): UTC+02:00 (CEST)
- INSEE/Postal code: 86254 /86500
- ^{1} French Land Register data, which excludes lakes, ponds, glaciers > 1 km^{2} (0.386 sq mi or 247 acres) and river estuaries.

Saulgé (French pronunciation: [solʒe]) is a commune in the Vienne department in the Nouvelle-Aquitaine region in central-western France. The village is located 50 km southeast of Poitiers and 80 km northwest of Limoges.

== Population ==
Historical population
Year	Pop.	±% p.a.
1968	868	—
1975	904	+0.58%
1982	950	+0.71%
1990	1,020	+0.89%
1999	980	−0.44%
2007	965	−0.19%
2012	991	+0.53%
2017	1,013	+0.44%
2023	1,011	−0.03%
Source: INSEE

== See also ==
- Communes of the Vienne department
