= Azat-le-Ris =

- Commune
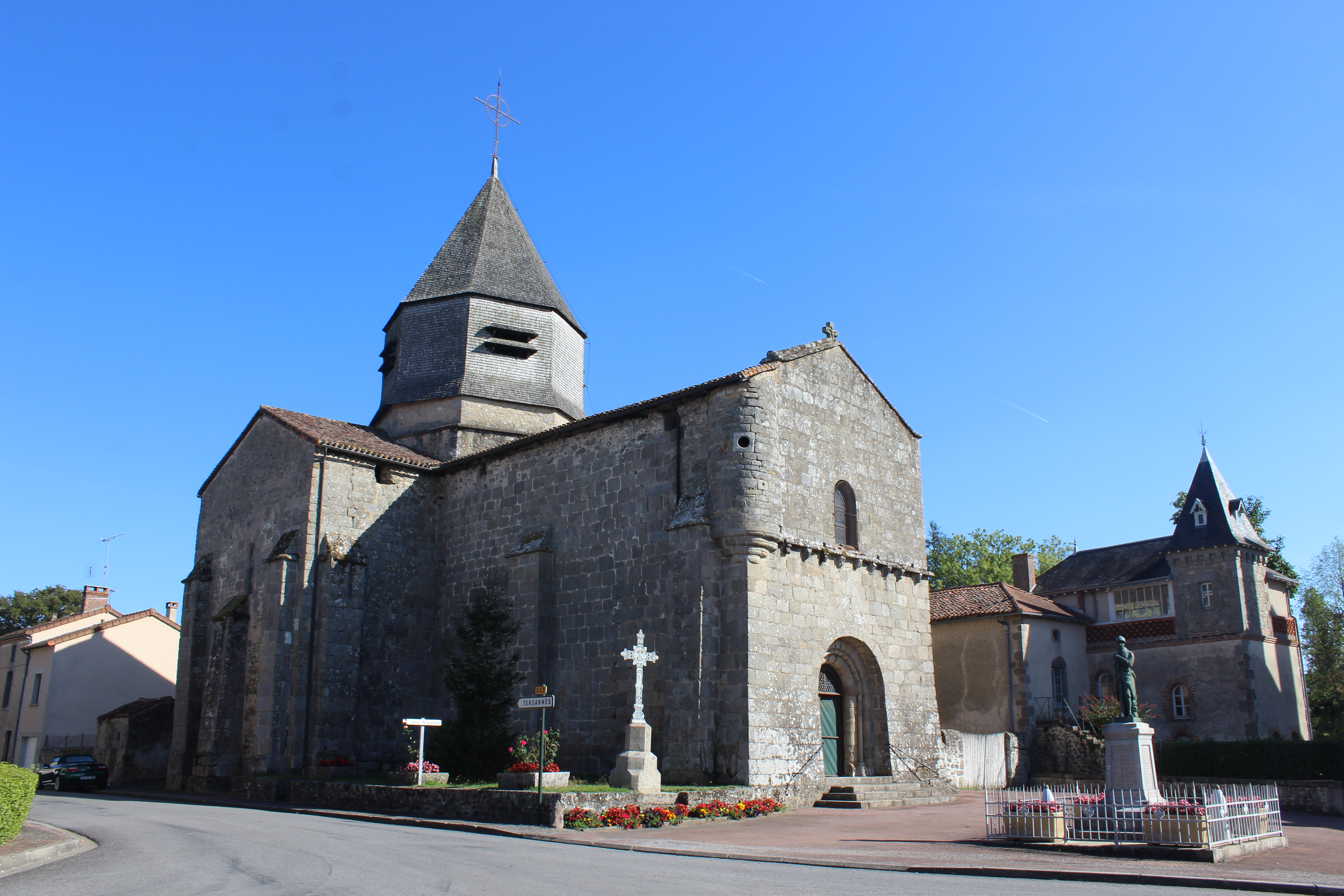
- Saint-Genest church

- Coat of arms
- Location of Azat-le-Ris
- Location within France Location within Nouvelle-Aquitaine
- Coordinates: 46°19′14″N 1°03′36″E
- Country: France
- Region: Nouvelle-Aquitaine
- Department: Haute-Vienne
- Arrondissement: Bellac
- Canton: Châteauponsac
- Intercommunality: CC Haut-Limousin Marche

Government
  - Mayor (2020–2026): Laurent Bregeaud
- Area^{1}: 56.22 km^{2} (21.71 sq mi)
- Highest elevation: 282 m (925 ft)
- Lowest elevation: 1,790 m (5,870 ft)
- Population (2023): 241
  - Density: 4.29/km^{2} (11.1/sq mi)
- Time zone: UTC+01:00 (CET)
  - Summer (DST): UTC+02:00 (CEST)
- INSEE/Postal code: 87006 /87360
- ^{1} French Land Register data, which excludes lakes, ponds, glaciers > 1 km^{2} (0.386 sq mi or 247 acres) and river estuaries.

Azat-le-Ris (French pronunciation: [aza lə ʁi]; Limousin: Asac lo Riu, before 1995: Azat-le-Riz) is a commune in the Haute-Vienne department in the Nouvelle-Aquitaine region in western France.

== Geography ==
The Salleron has its source in the commune.

== See also ==
- Communes of the Haute-Vienne department
