= Lussac-les-Églises =

- Commune
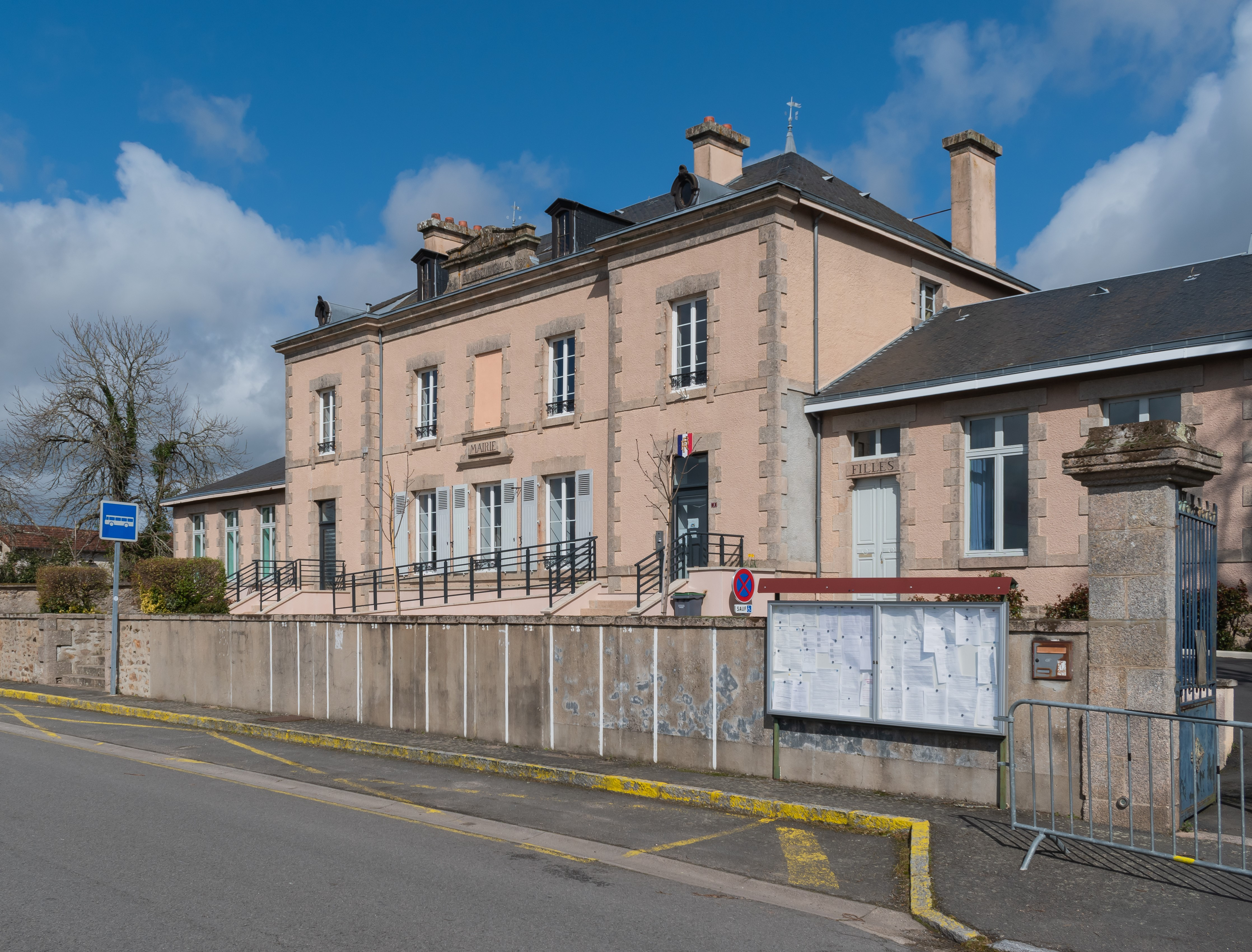
- Town hall of Lussac-les-Églises

- Coat of arms
- Location of Lussac-les-Églises
- Location within France Location within Nouvelle-Aquitaine
- Coordinates: 46°20′47″N 1°10′32″E
- Country: France
- Region: Nouvelle-Aquitaine
- Department: Haute-Vienne
- Arrondissement: Bellac
- Canton: Châteauponsac

Government
  - Mayor (2020–2026): Daniel Maitre
- Area^{1}: 41.02 km^{2} (15.84 sq mi)
- Highest elevation: 255 m (837 ft)
- Lowest elevation: 145 m (476 ft)
- Population (2023): 462
  - Density: 11.3/km^{2} (29.2/sq mi)
- Time zone: UTC+01:00 (CET)
  - Summer (DST): UTC+02:00 (CEST)
- INSEE/Postal code: 87087 /87360
- ^{1} French Land Register data, which excludes lakes, ponds, glaciers > 1 km^{2} (0.386 sq mi or 247 acres) and river estuaries.

Lussac-les-Églises (French pronunciation: [lysak le.z‿eɡliz]; Occitan: Luçac) is a commune in the Haute-Vienne department in the Nouvelle-Aquitaine region in west-central France.

== Geography ==
The river Benaize forms the commune's northern border.

== See also ==
- Communes of the Haute-Vienne department
