= Antigny-la-Ville =

- Commune
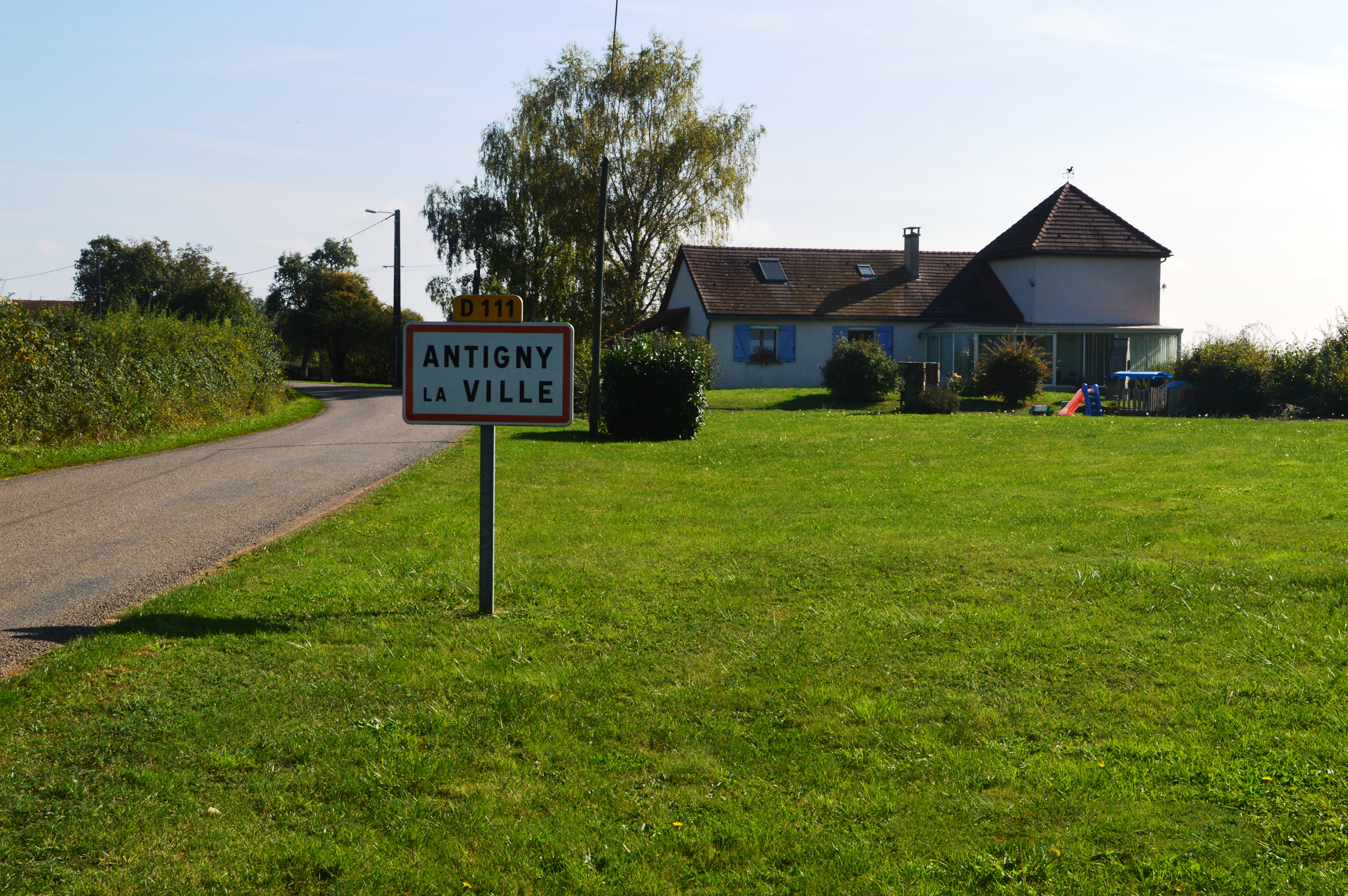
- The road into Antigny-la-Ville
- Location of Antigny-la-Ville
- Location within France Location within Bourgogne-Franche-Comté
- Coordinates: 47°06′08″N 4°33′34″E
- Country: France
- Region: Bourgogne-Franche-Comté
- Department: Côte-d'Or
- Arrondissement: Beaune
- Canton: Arnay-le-Duc
- Intercommunality: Pays Arnay Liernais

Government
  - Mayor (2020–2026): Laurent Bernot
- Area^{1}: 8.4 km^{2} (3.2 sq mi)
- Highest elevation: 457 m (1,499 ft)
- Lowest elevation: 406 m (1,332 ft)
- Population (2023): 86
  - Density: 10/km^{2} (27/sq mi)
- Time zone: UTC+01:00 (CET)
  - Summer (DST): UTC+02:00 (CEST)
- INSEE/Postal code: 21015 /21230
- ^{1} French Land Register data, which excludes lakes, ponds, glaciers > 1 km^{2} (0.386 sq mi or 247 acres) and river estuaries.

Antigny-la-Ville (French pronunciation: [ɑ̃tiɲi la vil]) is a commune in the Côte-d'Or department in the Bourgogne-Franche-Comté region of eastern France.

== Geography ==
Antigny-la-Ville is located some 60 km south-west of Dijon and 25 km north-west of Beaune. It can be accessed by the minor road D111 which runs off the D33 west of Bligny-sur-Ouche and passes west through the commune and the village continuing to join the D906 in the west. The D14 road also comes from Culètre in the north also passing through the village and continuing south to Lacanche. There are also many local roads giving access to the commune. In addition to the village there is also the hamlet of Chamoy in the north. The commune is mostly farmland but there are large forests in the west (the Bois du Petit Rondeau and the Bois de Retraite).

The Ruisseau du Breuil forms part of the northern border of the commune and gathers some tributaries which rise in the commune flowing west through the Étang de Breuil to join the Arroux south of Viscolon.

== History ==
During the revolutionary period of the National Convention (1792-1795), the commune was called Antigny-la-Montagne.

== Administration ==
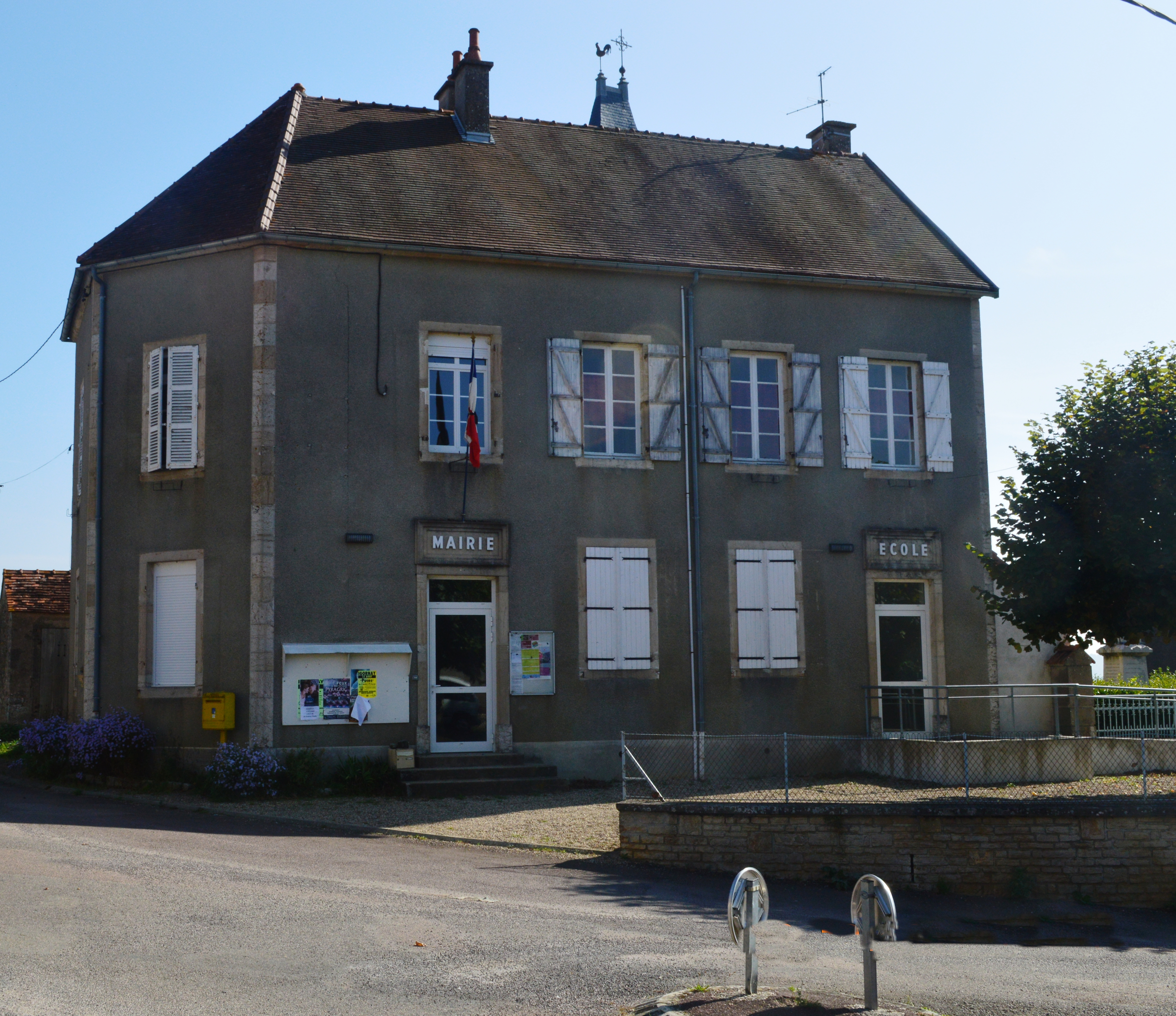
The Town Hall

List of Successive Mayors

From	To	Name
2001	2008	Robert Marquet
2008	2020	Roger Gagnepain
2020	2026	Laurent Bernot

== Demography ==
The inhabitants of the commune are known as Antinniens or Antinniennes in French.

Historical population

Year	Pop.	±% p.a.
1793	240	—
1821	306	+0.87%
1846	323	+0.22%
1872	281	−0.53%
1901	181	−1.51%
1926	176	−0.11%
1946	147	−0.90%
1962	147	+0.00%
1968	146	−0.11%

Year	Pop.	±% p.a.
1975	139	−0.70%
1982	125	−1.51%
1990	94	−3.50%
1999	105	+1.24%
2007	113	+0.92%
2012	116	+0.53%
2017	102	−2.54%
2023	86	−2.80%

Source: EHESS and INSEE

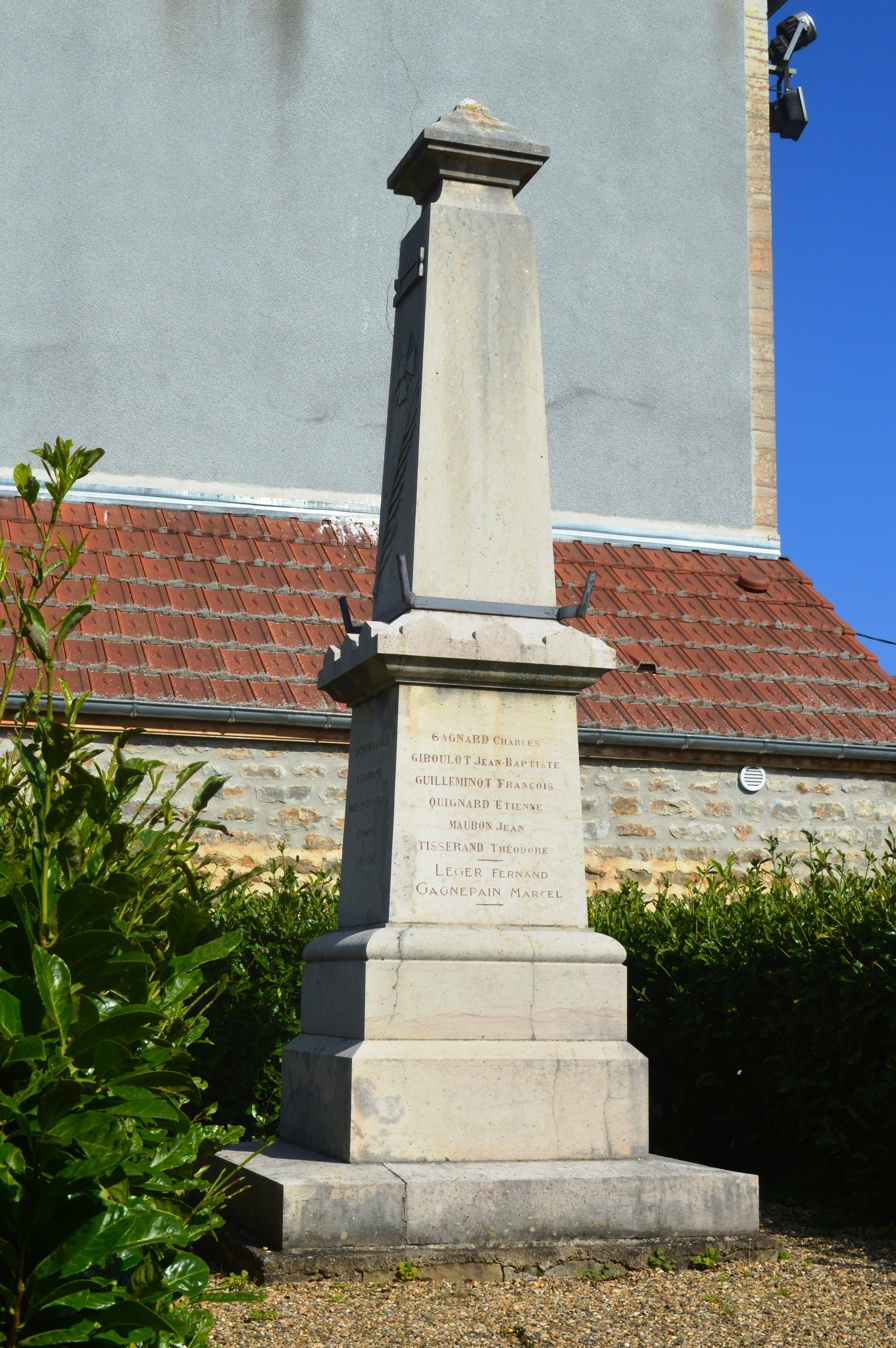
Antigny-la-Ville War Memorial

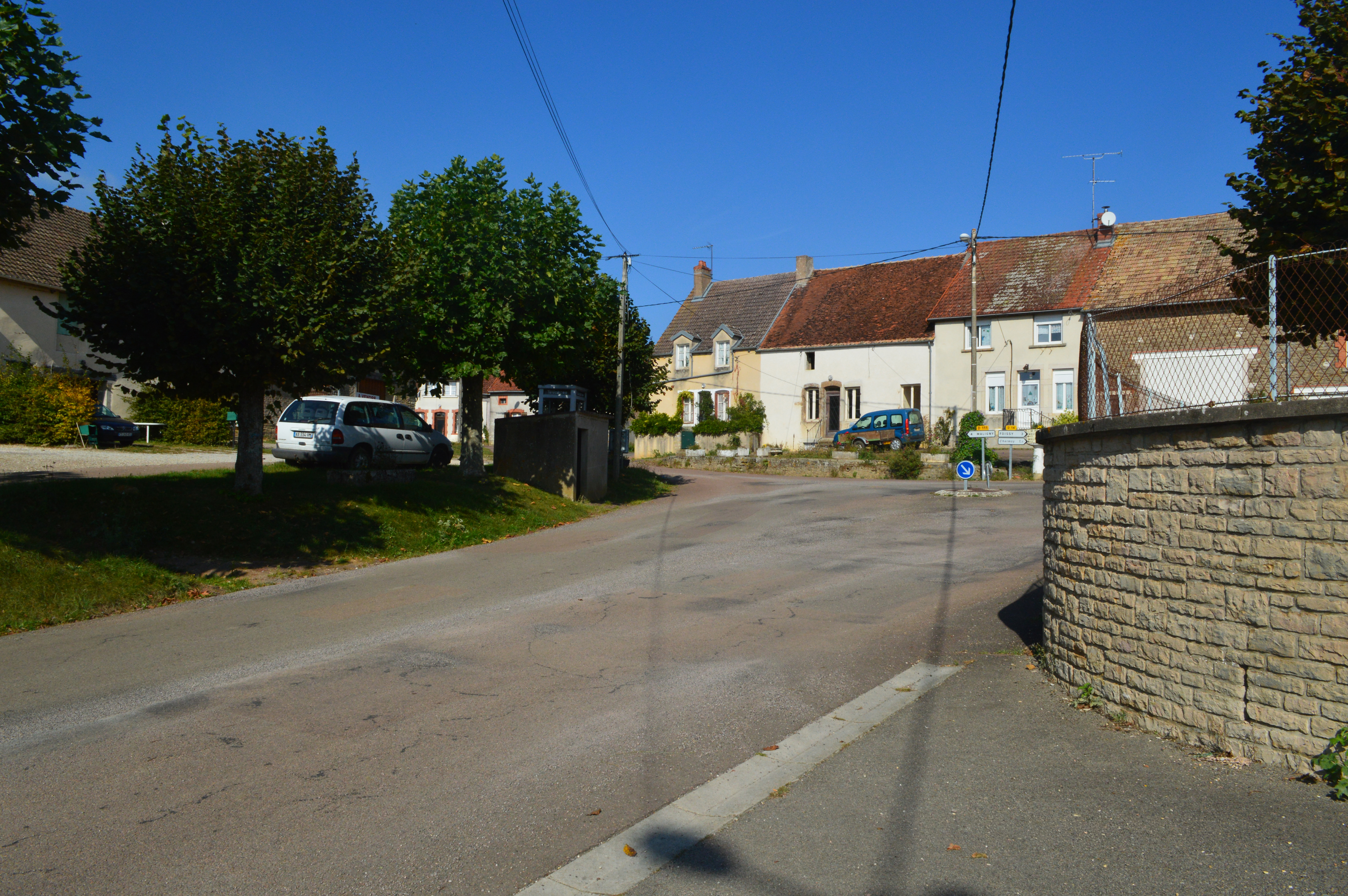
A street in Antigny-la-Ville

== Culture and heritage ==
=== Religious heritage ===
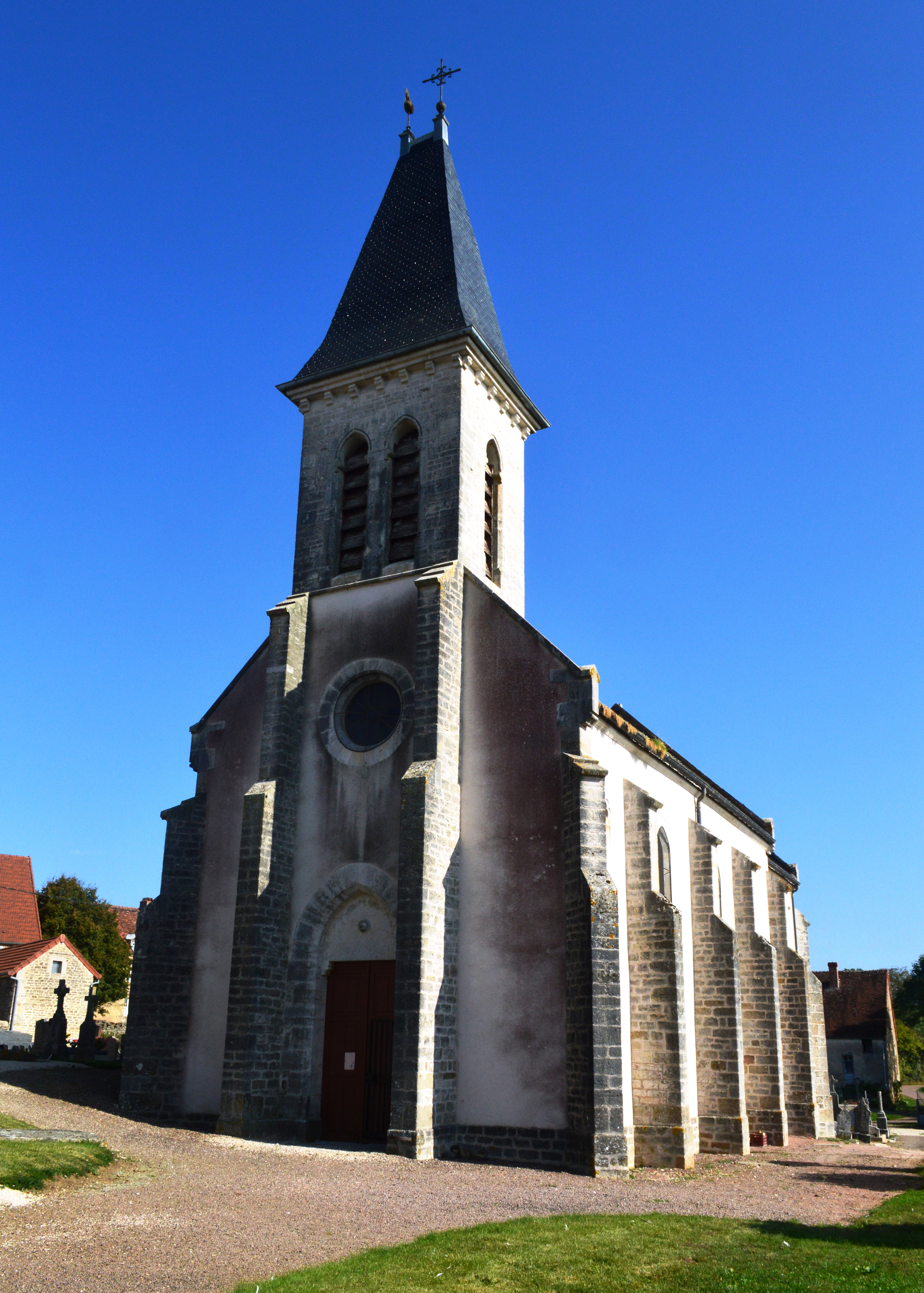
The Church of the Assumption

The Pariish Church of the Assumption contains several items that are registered as historical objects:

- A Bronze Bell (1734)
- A Painting: The vow of Louis XIII (17th century)
- A Statue: Saint Benoit (16th century)
- The Furniture in the Church
- 5 Stained glass windows (Bays 5, 6, 7, and 80) (1875)
- 5 Stained glass figures (Bays 1, 2, 3, 4, and 9) (1875)

== Notable people linked to the commune ==
- Florette Antigny appears in an obituary in the Abbey of Saint-Martin of Autun: VII id Floreta Antigny (13th century).

== See also ==
- Communes of the Côte-d'Or department
