= Thollet =

- Commune
- Location of Thollet
- Location within France Location within Nouvelle-Aquitaine
- Coordinates: 46°25′18″N 1°07′28″E
- Country: France
- Region: Nouvelle-Aquitaine
- Department: Vienne
- Arrondissement: Montmorillon
- Canton: Montmorillon

Government
  - Mayor (2021–2026): Xavier Monnais
- Area^{1}: 29.92 km^{2} (11.55 sq mi)
- Elevation: 200 m (660 ft)
- Highest elevation: 195 m (640 ft)
- Lowest elevation: 105 m (344 ft)
- Population (2023): 164
  - Density: 5.48/km^{2} (14.2/sq mi)
- Time zone: UTC+01:00 (CET)
  - Summer (DST): UTC+02:00 (CEST)
- INSEE/Postal code: 86270 /86290
- ^{1} French Land Register data, which excludes lakes, ponds, glaciers > 1 km^{2} (0.386 sq mi or 247 acres) and river estuaries.

Thollet (French pronunciation: [tɔlɛ]) is a commune in the Vienne department in the Nouvelle-Aquitaine region in western France.

== Geography ==
The river Benaize forms most of the commune's southeastern border, flows through the commune, then forms part of the commune's western border.

== See also ==
- Communes of the Vienne department
