= Cromac, Haute-Vienne =

Cromac
- Commune
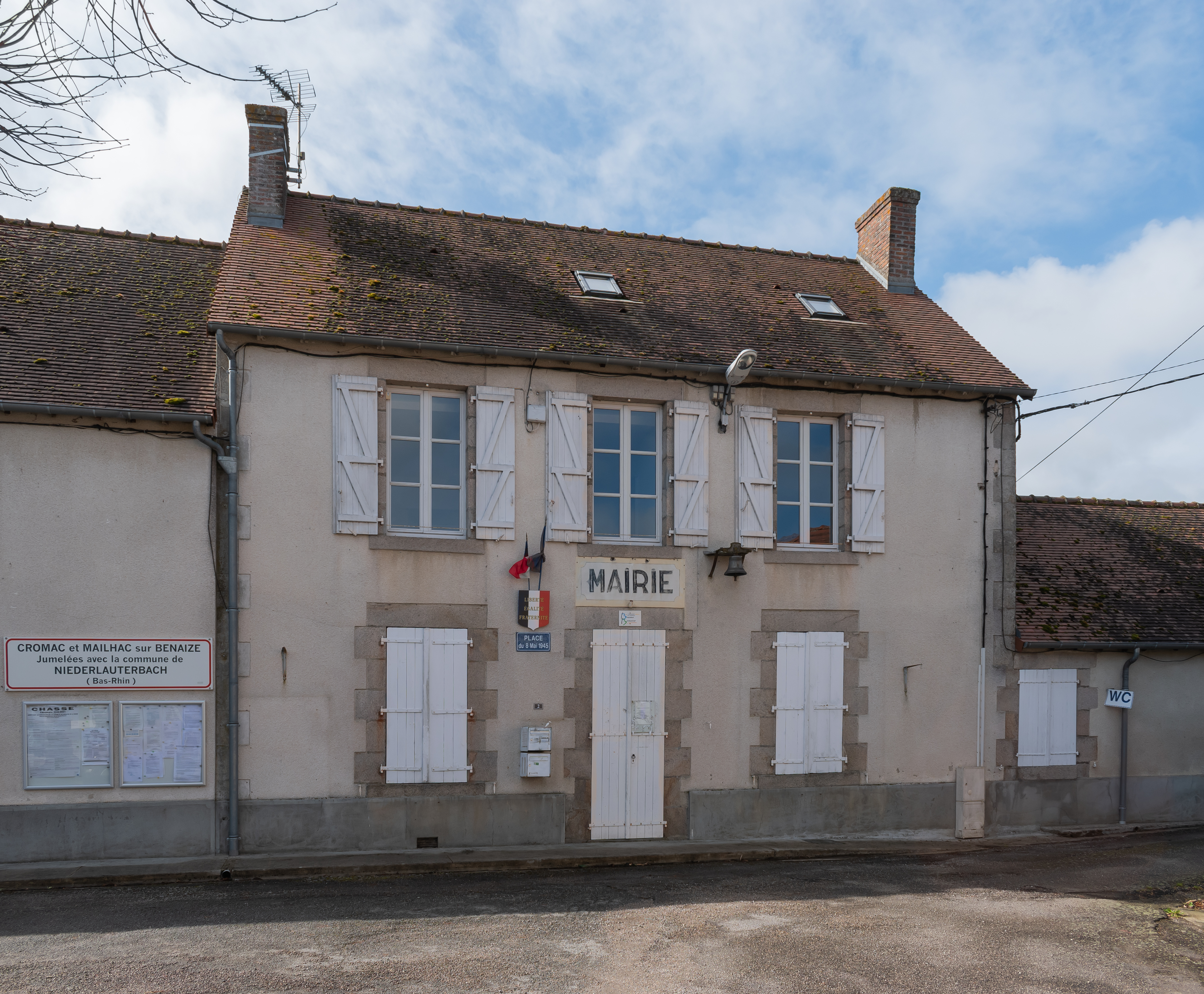
- Town hall of Cromac
- Location of Cromac
- Location within France Location within Nouvelle-Aquitaine
- Coordinates: 46°20′35″N 1°18′02″E
- Country: France
- Region: Nouvelle-Aquitaine
- Department: Haute-Vienne
- Arrondissement: Bellac
- Canton: Châteauponsac
- Intercommunality: Haut-Limousin en Marche

Government
  - Mayor (2020–2026): Nicolas Ovan
- Area^{1}: 24.15 km^{2} (9.32 sq mi)
- Highest elevation: 277 m (909 ft)
- Lowest elevation: 181 m (594 ft)
- Population (2023): 249
  - Density: 10.3/km^{2} (26.7/sq mi)
- Time zone: UTC+01:00 (CET)
  - Summer (DST): UTC+02:00 (CEST)
- INSEE/Postal code: 87053 /87160
- ^{1} French Land Register data, which excludes lakes, ponds, glaciers > 1 km^{2} (0.386 sq mi or 247 acres) and river estuaries.

Cromac (French pronunciation: [kʁɔmak]; Occitan: Cròmac) is a commune in the Haute-Vienne department in the Nouvelle-Aquitaine region in western France.

== Geography ==
The river Benaize forms part of the commune's south-eastern border, flows through the commune, then forms part of the commune's south-western border.

Inhabitants are known as Cromacois.

== See also ==
- Communes of the Haute-Vienne department
