= Nalliers, Vienne =

Nalliers
- Commune
- Location of Nalliers
- Location within France Location within Nouvelle-Aquitaine
- Coordinates: 46°36′07″N 0°52′01″E
- Country: France
- Region: Nouvelle-Aquitaine
- Department: Vienne
- Arrondissement: Montmorillon
- Canton: Montmorillon

Government
  - Mayor (2020–2026): William Boiron
- Area^{1}: 16.03 km^{2} (6.19 sq mi)
- Highest elevation: 134 m (440 ft)
- Lowest elevation: 72 m (236 ft)
- Population (2023): 302
  - Density: 18.8/km^{2} (48.8/sq mi)
- Time zone: UTC+01:00 (CET)
  - Summer (DST): UTC+02:00 (CEST)
- INSEE/Postal code: 86175 /86310
- ^{1} French Land Register data, which excludes lakes, ponds, glaciers > 1 km^{2} (0.386 sq mi or 247 acres) and river estuaries.

Nalliers (French pronunciation: [nalje]) is a commune in the Vienne department in the Nouvelle-Aquitaine region in western France.

== See also ==
- Communes of the Vienne department
