= Haims =

- Commune
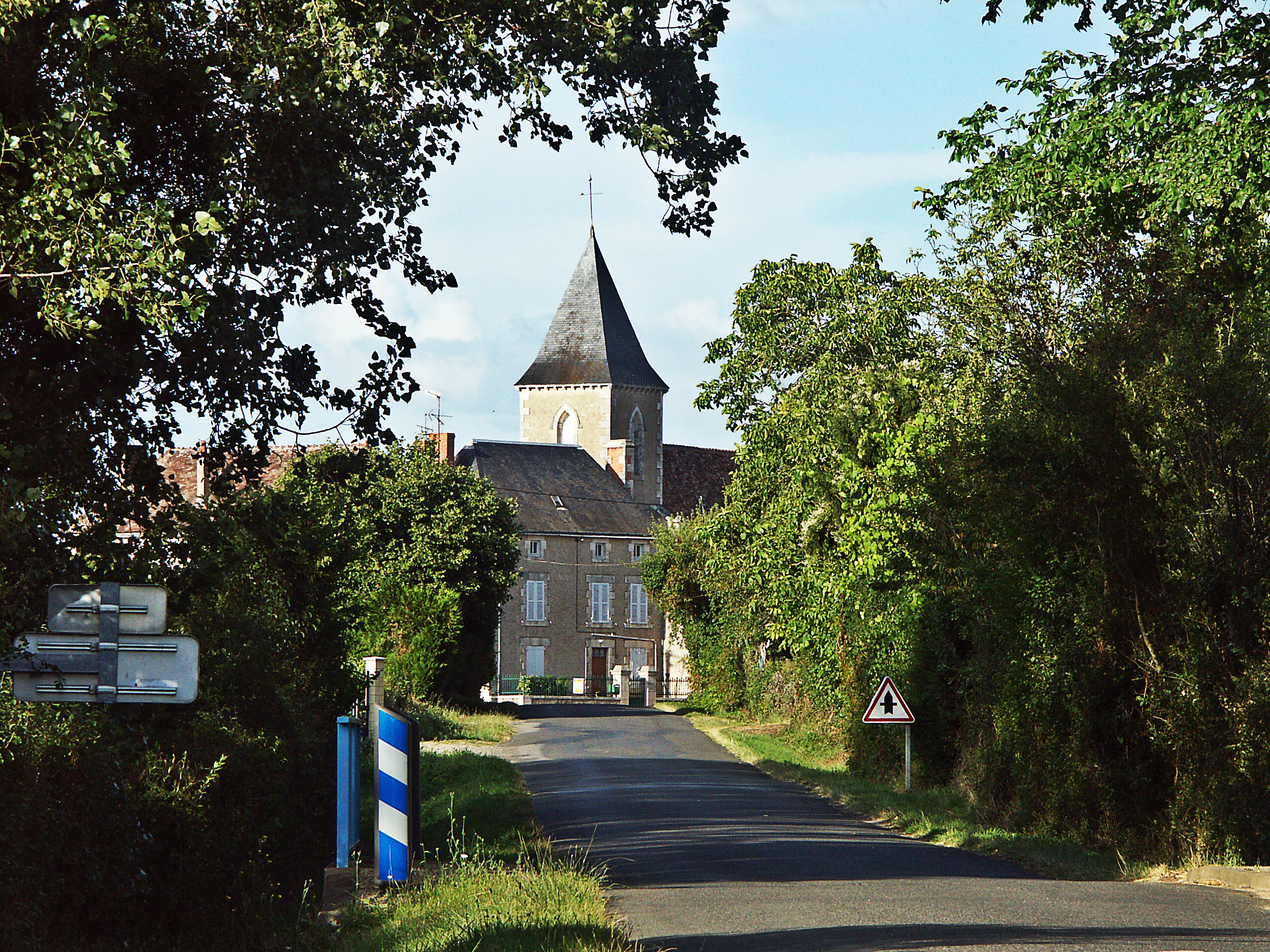
- The church in Haims
- Location of Haims
- Location within France Location within Nouvelle-Aquitaine
- Coordinates: 46°30′12″N 0°55′10″E
- Country: France
- Region: Nouvelle-Aquitaine
- Department: Vienne
- Arrondissement: Montmorillon
- Canton: Montmorillon

Government
  - Mayor (2020–2026): Christophe Androdias
- Area^{1}: 32.25 km^{2} (12.45 sq mi)
- Elevation: 157 m (515 ft)
- Highest elevation: 152 m (499 ft)
- Lowest elevation: 92 m (302 ft)
- Population (2023): 228
  - Density: 7.07/km^{2} (18.3/sq mi)
- Time zone: UTC+01:00 (CET)
  - Summer (DST): UTC+02:00 (CEST)
- INSEE/Postal code: 86110 /86310
- ^{1} French Land Register data, which excludes lakes, ponds, glaciers > 1 km^{2} (0.386 sq mi or 247 acres) and river estuaries.

Haims (French pronunciation: [ɛ̃s]) is a commune in the Vienne department in the Nouvelle-Aquitaine region in western France.

== Geography and hydrography ==
The town is crossed by the River Chambron and the River Salleron. The Salleron forms part of the commune's eastern border. Despite this there was a lack of water. Haims has calcareous soil that does not hold water and is crossed by no other watercourse than the Salleron. Every house has wells and drinking pits. The pit's bottom is covered with white clay to retain rainwater. This water was used for everyday consumption and even for making baby bottles. Getting water to Haims was a job undertaken by Bechet, Georgets, Tutaudière and Puy Franc.

The village of Haims has six wells. The one located in the public garden is 18 m deep.

The village also has communal pits which designed in the same way as the private drinking pits, but they are larger in size and rectangular in shape. They date from the 19th century or the beginning of the 20th century. Historically the village's laundrey was cleaned on the Salleron, to wash the linen. Access to water was an important issue and was the source of some disputes until 1958 when an external water supply wasinstalled. It led to a boom in agriculture. The boom is now over and agriculture is in decline.

== See also ==
- Communes of the Vienne department
