= Antigny, Vienne =

Antigny
- Commune
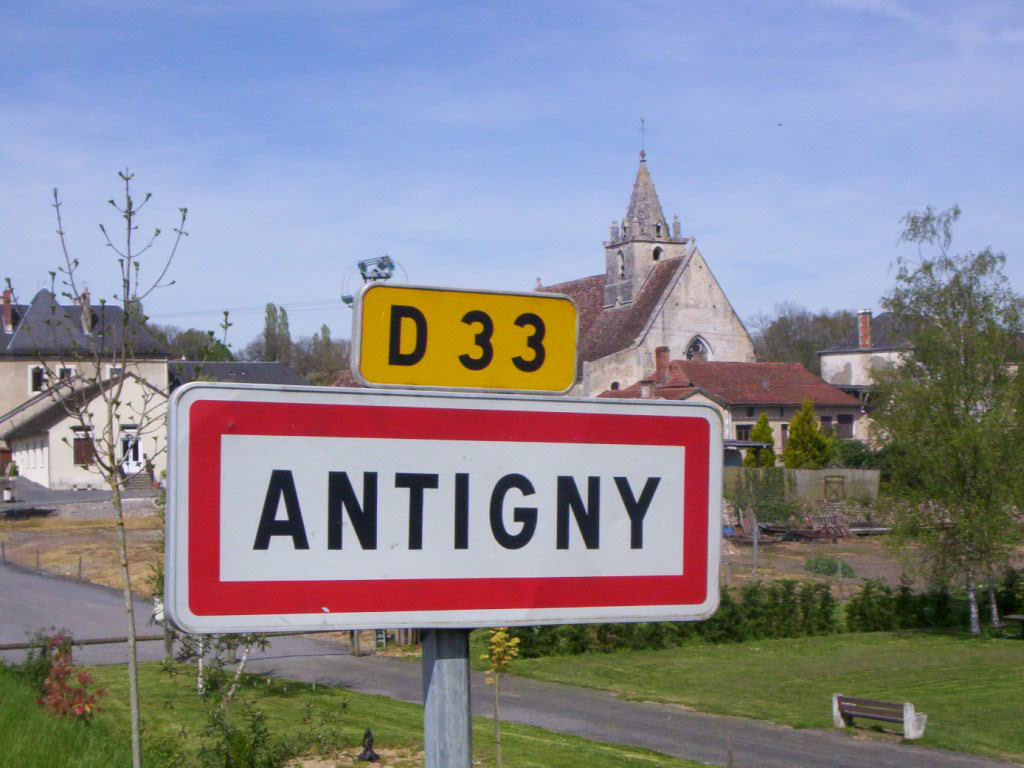
- Antigny
- Location of Antigny
- Location within France Location within Nouvelle-Aquitaine
- Coordinates: 46°32′09″N 0°51′17″E
- Country: France
- Region: Nouvelle-Aquitaine
- Department: Vienne
- Arrondissement: Montmorillon
- Canton: Montmorillon

Government
  - Mayor (2020–2026): Vincent Lauer
- Area^{1}: 43.93 km^{2} (16.96 sq mi)
- Elevation: 124 m (407 ft)
- Highest elevation: 148 m (486 ft)
- Lowest elevation: 75 m (246 ft)
- Population (2023): 550
  - Density: 13/km^{2} (32/sq mi)
- Time zone: UTC+01:00 (CET)
  - Summer (DST): UTC+02:00 (CEST)
- INSEE/Postal code: 86006 /86310
- ^{1} French Land Register data, which excludes lakes, ponds, glaciers > 1 km^{2} (0.386 sq mi or 247 acres) and river estuaries.

Antigny (French pronunciation: [ɑ̃tiɲi]) is a commune in the Vienne department in the Nouvelle-Aquitaine region in western France.

== Notable people ==
- Francis Paudras, pianist and author of Dance of the Infideis, died of suicide at his castle in Antigny in 1998

== See also ==
- Communes of the Vienne department
