= Vaulry =

- Commune
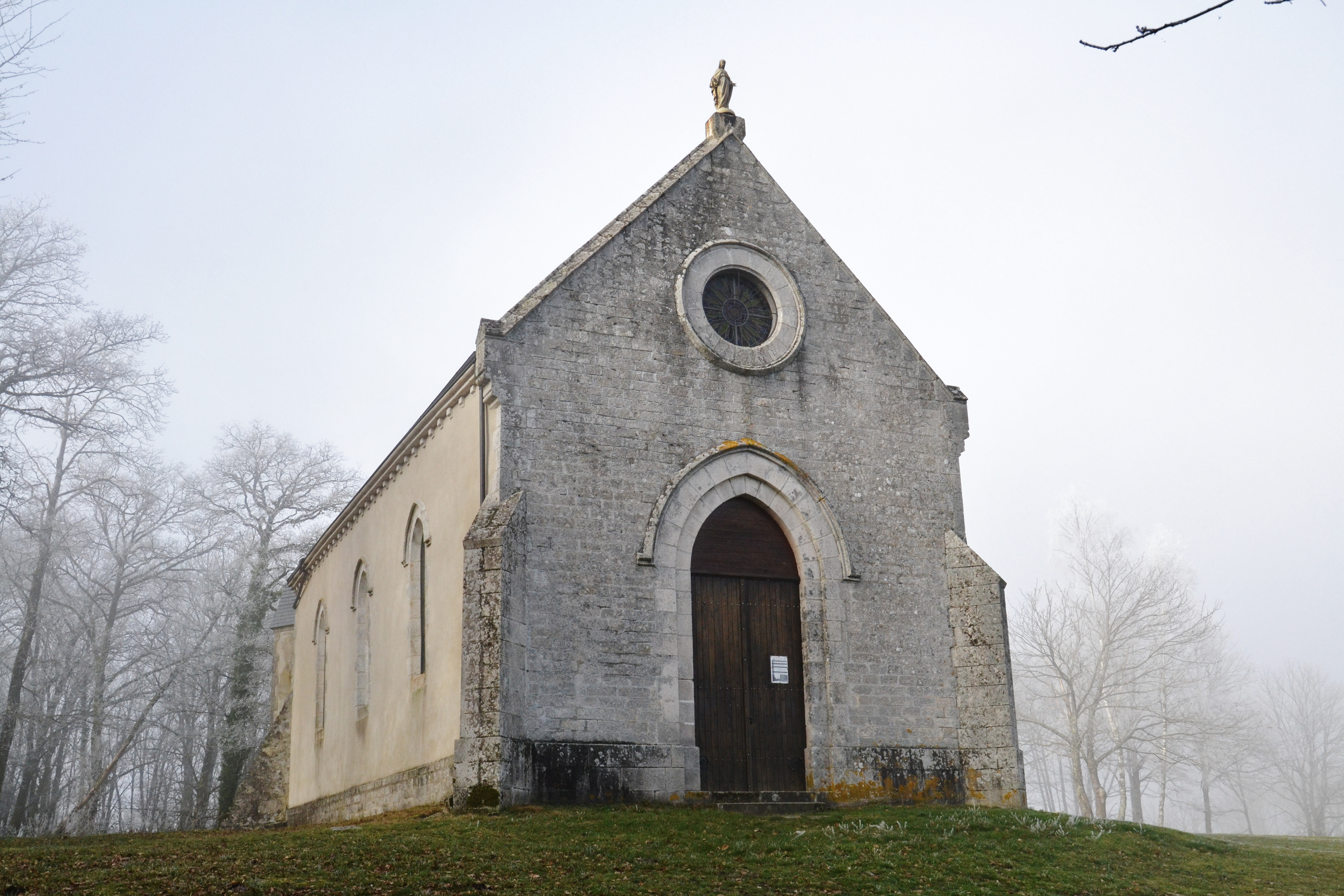
- The chapel in Vaulry

- Coat of arms
- Location of Vaulry
- Location within France Location within Nouvelle-Aquitaine
- Coordinates: 46°01′24″N 1°05′12″E
- Country: France
- Region: Nouvelle-Aquitaine
- Department: Haute-Vienne
- Arrondissement: Bellac
- Canton: Bellac

Government
  - Mayor (2020–2026): Bernard Peigner
- Area^{1}: 16.03 km^{2} (6.19 sq mi)
- Highest elevation: 502 m (1,647 ft)
- Lowest elevation: 233 m (764 ft)
- Population (2023): 394
  - Density: 24.6/km^{2} (63.7/sq mi)
- Time zone: UTC+01:00 (CET)
  - Summer (DST): UTC+02:00 (CEST)
- INSEE/Postal code: 87198 /87140
- ^{1} French Land Register data, which excludes lakes, ponds, glaciers > 1 km^{2} (0.386 sq mi or 247 acres) and river estuaries.

Vaulry (French pronunciation: [volʁi]; Occitan: Vauric) is a commune in the Haute-Vienne department in the Nouvelle-Aquitaine region in west-central France.

Inhabitants are known as Vaurinaux.

== See also ==
- Communes of the Haute-Vienne department
