= Arrondissement of Limoges =

Coordinates: 45°50′N 1°15′E

Limoges
- Arrondissement
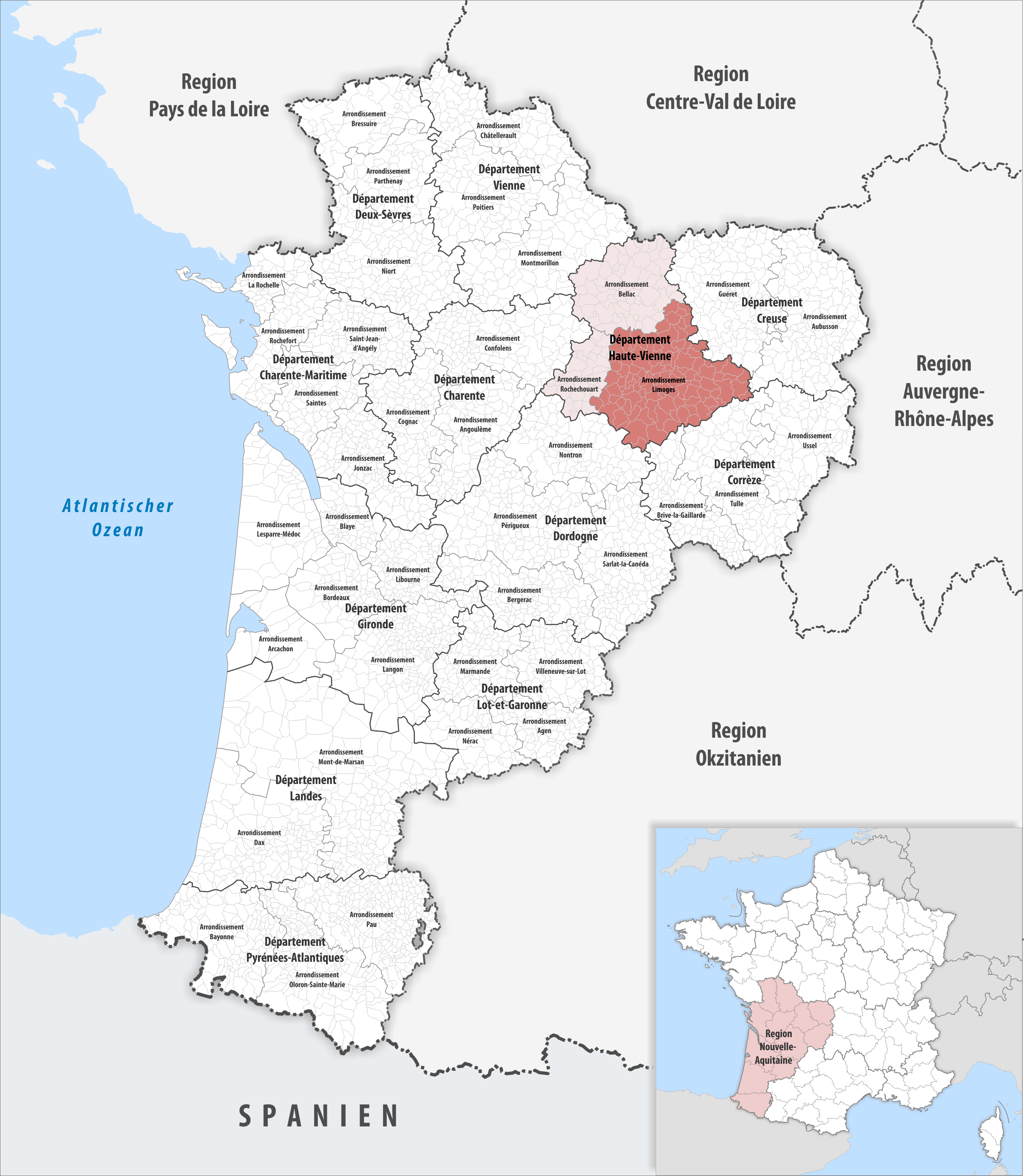
- Location within the region Nouvelle-Aquitaine
- Country: France
- Region: Nouvelle-Aquitaine
- Department: Haute-Vienne
- No. of communes: {{{nbcomm}}}
- Area: 2,944.8 km^{2} (1,137.0 sq mi)
- Population (2023): 297,483
  - Density: 101.02/km^{2} (261.64/sq mi)
- INSEE code: 872

The arrondissement of Limoges is an arrondissement of France in the Haute-Vienne department in the Nouvelle-Aquitaine region. It has 108 communes. Its population is 296,099 (2021), and its area is 2,944.8 km^{2} (1,137.0 sq mi).

== Composition ==
The communes of the arrondissement of Limoges, and their INSEE codes, are:

1. Aixe-sur-Vienne (87001)
2. Ambazac (87002)
3. Augne (87004)
4. Aureil (87005)
5. Beaumont-du-Lac (87009)
6. Bersac-sur-Rivalier (87013)
7. Beynac (87015)
8. Les Billanges (87016)
9. Boisseuil (87019)
10. Bonnac-la-Côte (87020)
11. Bosmie-l'Aiguille (87021)
12. Bujaleuf (87024)
13. Burgnac (87025)
14. Bussière-Galant (87027)
15. Les Cars (87029)
16. Le Chalard (87031)
17. Châlus (87032)
18. Champnétery (87035)
19. Chaptelat (87038)
20. Château-Chervix (87039)
21. Châteauneuf-la-Forêt (87040)
22. Le Châtenet-en-Dognon (87042)
23. Cheissoux (87043)
24. Condat-sur-Vienne (87048)
25. Coussac-Bonneval (87049)
26. Couzeix (87050)
27. La Croisille-sur-Briance (87051)
28. Domps (87058)
29. Eybouleuf (87062)
30. Eyjeaux (87063)
31. Eymoutiers (87064)
32. Feytiat (87065)
33. Flavignac (87066)
34. La Geneytouse (87070)
35. Glandon (87071)
36. Glanges (87072)
37. Isle (87075)
38. Jabreilles-les-Bordes (87076)
39. Janailhac (87077)
40. La Jonchère-Saint-Maurice (87079)
41. Jourgnac (87081)
42. Ladignac-le-Long (87082)
43. Laurière (87083)
44. Lavignac (87084)
45. Limoges (87085)
46. Linards (87086)
47. Magnac-Bourg (87088)
48. Masléon (87093)
49. Meilhac (87094)
50. Meuzac (87095)
51. La Meyze (87096)
52. Moissannes (87099)
53. Nedde (87104)
54. Neuvic-Entier (87105)
55. Nexon (87106)
56. Nieul (87107)
57. Pageas (87112)
58. Le Palais-sur-Vienne (87113)
59. Panazol (87114)
60. Peyrat-le-Château (87117)
61. Peyrilhac (87118)
62. Pierre-Buffière (87119)
63. La Porcherie (87120)
64. Rempnat (87123)
65. Rilhac-Lastours (87124)
66. Rilhac-Rancon (87125)
67. La Roche-l'Abeille (87127)
68. Royères (87129)
69. Roziers-Saint-Georges (87130)
70. Saint-Amand-le-Petit (87132)
71. Saint-Bonnet-Briance (87138)
72. Saint-Denis-des-Murs (87142)
73. Sainte-Anne-Saint-Priest (87134)
74. Saint-Gence (87143)
75. Saint-Genest-sur-Roselle (87144)
76. Saint-Germain-les-Belles (87146)
77. Saint-Gilles-les-Forêts (87147)
78. Saint-Hilaire-Bonneval (87148)
79. Saint-Hilaire-les-Places (87150)
80. Saint-Jean-Ligoure (87151)
81. Saint-Jouvent (87152)
82. Saint-Julien-le-Petit (87153)
83. Saint-Just-le-Martel (87156)
84. Saint-Laurent-les-Églises (87157)
85. Saint-Léger-la-Montagne (87159)
86. Saint-Léonard-de-Noblat (87161)
87. Saint-Martin-le-Vieux (87166)
88. Saint-Martin-Terressus (87167)
89. Saint-Maurice-les-Brousses (87169)
90. Saint-Méard (87170)
91. Saint-Paul (87174)
92. Saint-Priest-Ligoure (87176)
93. Saint-Priest-sous-Aixe (87177)
94. Saint-Priest-Taurion (87178)
95. Saint-Sulpice-Laurière (87181)
96. Saint-Sylvestre (87183)
97. Saint-Vitte-sur-Briance (87186)
98. Saint-Yrieix-la-Perche (87187)
99. Saint-Yrieix-sous-Aixe (87188)
100. Sauviat-sur-Vige (87190)
101. Séreilhac (87191)
102. Solignac (87192)
103. Surdoux (87193)
104. Sussac (87194)
105. Verneuil-sur-Vienne (87201)
106. Veyrac (87202)
107. Vicq-sur-Breuilh (87203)
108. Le Vigen (87205)

== History ==
The arrondissement of Limoges was created in 1800.

As a result of the reorganisation of the cantons of France which came into effect in 2015, the borders of the cantons are no longer related to the borders of the arrondissements. The cantons of the arrondissement of Limoges were, as of January 2015:

1. Aixe-sur-Vienne
2. Ambazac
3. Châlus
4. Châteauneuf-la-Forêt
5. Eymoutiers
6. Laurière
7. Limoges-Beaupuy
8. Limoges-Carnot
9. Limoges-Centre
10. Limoges-Cité
11. Limoges-Condat
12. Limoges-Corgnac
13. Limoges-Couzeix
14. Limoges-Émailleurs
15. Limoges-Grand-Treuil
16. Limoges-Isle
17. Limoges-La Bastide
18. Limoges-Landouge
19. Limoges-Le Palais
20. Limoges-Panazol
21. Limoges-Puy-las-Rodas
22. Limoges-Vigenal
23. Nexon
24. Nieul
25. Pierre-Buffière
26. Saint-Germain-les-Belles
27. Saint-Léonard-de-Noblat
28. Saint-Yrieix-la-Perche
