= Magnac–Vicq station =

Railway station in Vicq-sur-Breuilh, France

Coordinates: 45°37′45″N 1°26′38″E

Magnac–Vicq is a railway station in Magnac-Bourg and near Vicq-sur-Breuilh, Nouvelle-Aquitaine, France. The station is located on the Orléans–Montauban railway line. The station is served by TER (local) services operated by SNCF.

== Train services ==
The following services currently call at Magnac-Vicq:

- local service (TER Nouvelle-Aquitaine) Limoges - Uzerche - Brive-la-Gaillarde

Preceding station	TER Nouvelle-Aquitaine	Following station
Pierre-Buffière towards Limoges	22	Saint-Germain-les-Belles towards Brive-la-Gaillarde
