= Neuvic =

Neuvic may refer to the following places in France:

- Neuvic, Corrèze, a commune in the department of Corrèze
- Neuvic, Dordogne, a commune in the department of Dordogne
- Neuvic-Entier, a commune in the department of Haute-Vienne
