= Le Travailleur du Centre Ouest =

Communist newspaper in France

- Le Travailleur du Centre et du Centre Ouest, May 1, 1944 cover
- Type: Weekly
- Publisher: French Communist Party
- Political alignment: Communist
- Language: French language
- Headquarters: 6, rue de la Providence, Limoges 45°49′46.6″N 1°15′55.6″E
- Circulation: 5,000

Le Travailleur du Centre Ouest ('The Mid-West Worker') was a communist weekly newspaper published from Limoges, France. Le Travailleur du Centre Ouest was the regional organ of the French Communist Party in Limousin. It was founded as a continuation of the Communist Party newspaper in Corrèze, Le Travailleur de Corrèze, and the communist organs in Creuse and the Haute-Vienne.

Le Travailleur du Centre Ouest was printed in 5,000 copies. As of 1929, 62% of its subscribers lived in the country-side. For example, 3.2% of the inhabitants of Saint-Julien-le-Petit were subscribers, compared to 0.3% in Limoges and 1.9% in Saint-Junien. Le Travailleur du Centre Ouest supported collectivization as the solution for the agrarian crisis.

During the Second World War, it was published irregularly as Le Travailleur du Centre et du Centre Ouest.
