= Linards =

- Commune
- Location of Linards
- Location within France Location within Nouvelle-Aquitaine
- Coordinates: 45°42′09″N 1°31′56″E
- Country: France
- Region: Nouvelle-Aquitaine
- Department: Haute-Vienne
- Arrondissement: Limoges
- Canton: Eymoutiers
- Intercommunality: Briance-Combade

Government
  - Mayor (2020–2026): Philippe Raigné
- Area^{1}: 36.30 km^{2} (14.02 sq mi)
- Highest elevation: 532 m (1,745 ft)
- Lowest elevation: 332 m (1,089 ft)
- Population (2023): 1,001
  - Density: 27.58/km^{2} (71.42/sq mi)
- Time zone: UTC+01:00 (CET)
  - Summer (DST): UTC+02:00 (CEST)
- INSEE/Postal code: 87086 /87130
- ^{1} French Land Register data, which excludes lakes, ponds, glaciers > 1 km^{2} (0.386 sq mi or 247 acres) and river estuaries.

Linards (French pronunciation: [linaʁ]; Occitan: Linards) is a commune in the Haute-Vienne department in the Nouvelle-Aquitaine region in west-central France.

== Geography ==
The river Briance forms part of the commune's southern border.

Inhabitants are known as Linardais.

The commune of Linards has an area of 36.3 km2. The nearest large city is Limoges, which is located 34 km to the northwest.

== See also ==
- Communes of the Haute-Vienne department
