= Coussac-Bonneval =

- Commune
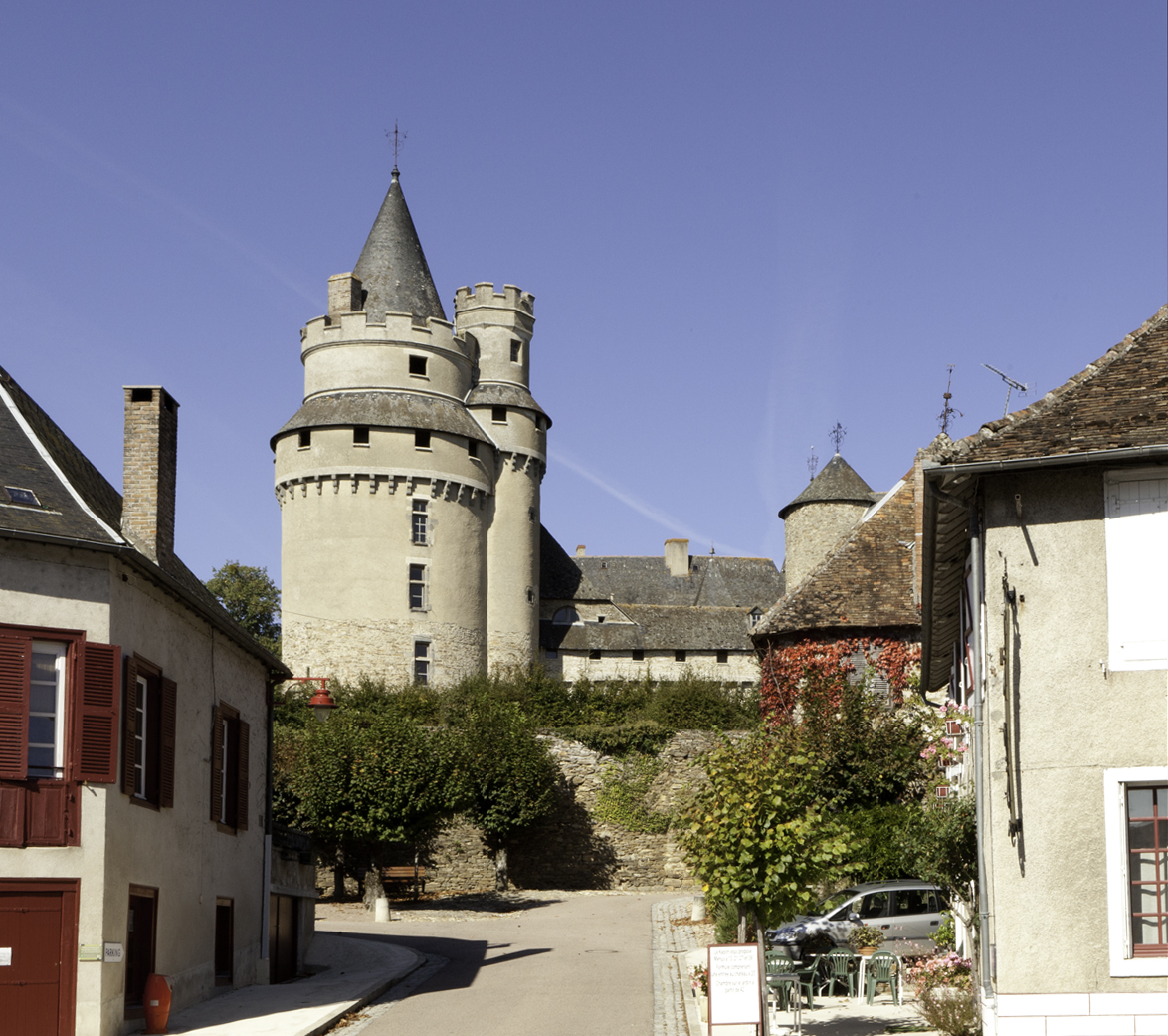
- A view of the Château de Bonneval

- Coat of arms
- Location of Coussac-Bonneval
- Location within France Location within Nouvelle-Aquitaine
- Coordinates: 45°30′43″N 1°19′30″E
- Country: France
- Region: Nouvelle-Aquitaine
- Department: Haute-Vienne
- Arrondissement: Limoges
- Canton: Eymoutiers
- Intercommunality: Pays de Saint-Yrieix

Government
  - Mayor (2020–2026): Philippe Sudrat
- Area^{1}: 66.73 km^{2} (25.76 sq mi)
- Highest elevation: 454 m (1,490 ft)
- Lowest elevation: 280 m (920 ft)
- Population (2023): 1,262
  - Density: 18.91/km^{2} (48.98/sq mi)
- Time zone: UTC+01:00 (CET)
  - Summer (DST): UTC+02:00 (CEST)
- INSEE/Postal code: 87049 /87500
- ^{1} French Land Register data, which excludes lakes, ponds, glaciers > 1 km^{2} (0.386 sq mi or 247 acres) and river estuaries.

Coussac-Bonneval (French pronunciation: [kusak bɔnval]; Occitan: Coçac) is a commune in the Haute-Vienne department in the Nouvelle-Aquitaine region in western France. Coussac-Bonneval station has rail connections to Brive-la-Gaillarde and Limoges.

Inhabitants are known as Coussacois.

== See also ==
- Communes of the Haute-Vienne department
