= La Croisille-sur-Briance =

- Commune
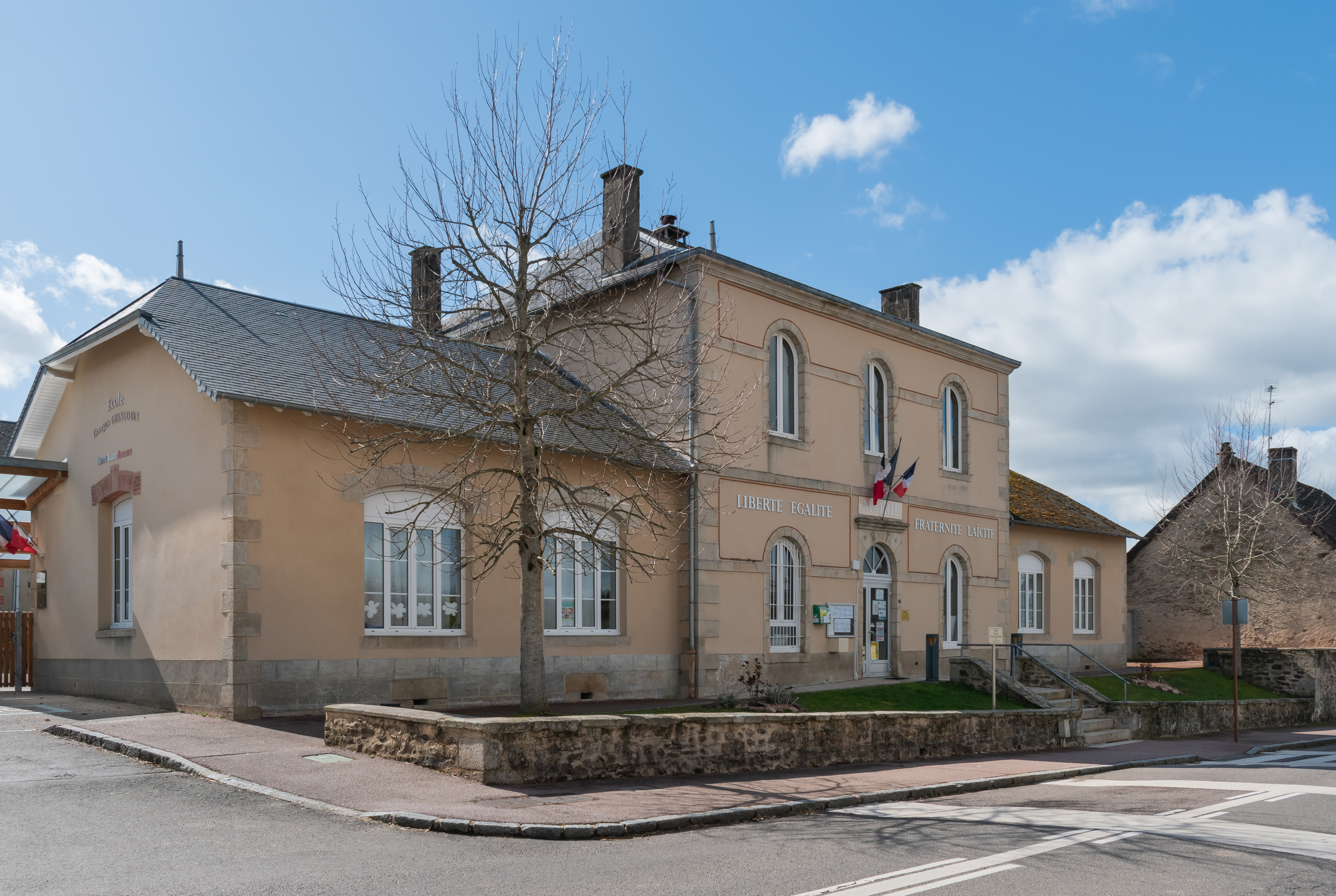
- Town hall of La Croisille-sur-Briance

- Coat of arms
- Location of La Croisille-sur-Briance
- Location within France Location within Nouvelle-Aquitaine
- Coordinates: 45°37′53″N 1°34′59″E
- Country: France
- Region: Nouvelle-Aquitaine
- Department: Haute-Vienne
- Arrondissement: Limoges
- Canton: Eymoutiers
- Intercommunality: Briance-Combade

Government
  - Mayor (2020–2026): Jean-Gérard Didierre
- Area^{1}: 43.61 km^{2} (16.84 sq mi)
- Highest elevation: 709 m (2,326 ft)
- Lowest elevation: 387 m (1,270 ft)
- Population (2023): 728
  - Density: 16.7/km^{2} (43.2/sq mi)
- Time zone: UTC+01:00 (CET)
  - Summer (DST): UTC+02:00 (CEST)
- INSEE/Postal code: 87051 /87130
- ^{1} French Land Register data, which excludes lakes, ponds, glaciers > 1 km^{2} (0.386 sq mi or 247 acres) and river estuaries.

La Croisille-sur-Briance (French pronunciation: [la kʁwazij syʁ bʁijɑ̃s], literally La Croisille on Briance; Occitan: La Crosilha) is a commune in the Haute-Vienne department in the Nouvelle-Aquitaine region in western France.

== Geography ==
The river Briance has its source in the commune.

== See also ==
- Communes of the Haute-Vienne department
