= Saint-Vitte-sur-Briance =

- Commune
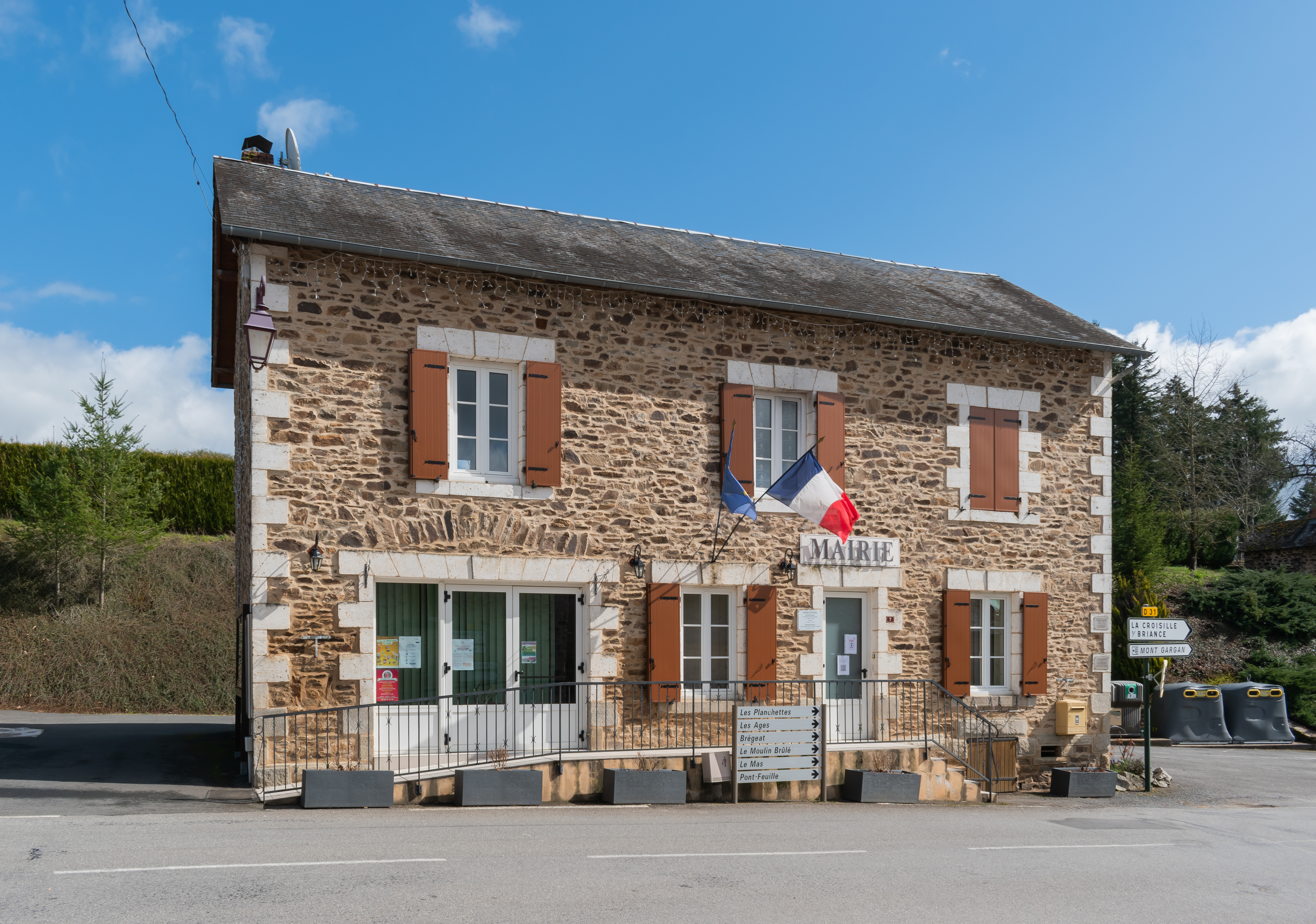
- Town hall of St-Vitte-sur-Briance

- Coat of arms
- Location of Saint-Vitte-sur-Briance
- Location within France Location within Nouvelle-Aquitaine
- Coordinates: 45°37′33″N 1°32′50″E
- Country: France
- Region: Nouvelle-Aquitaine
- Department: Haute-Vienne
- Arrondissement: Limoges
- Canton: Eymoutiers

Government
  - Mayor (2020–2026): Stéphane Prevost
- Area^{1}: 20.66 km^{2} (7.98 sq mi)
- Highest elevation: 497 m (1,631 ft)
- Lowest elevation: 352 m (1,155 ft)
- Population (2023): 316
  - Density: 15.3/km^{2} (39.6/sq mi)
- Time zone: UTC+01:00 (CET)
  - Summer (DST): UTC+02:00 (CEST)
- INSEE/Postal code: 87186 /87380
- ^{1} French Land Register data, which excludes lakes, ponds, glaciers > 1 km^{2} (0.386 sq mi or 247 acres) and river estuaries.

Saint-Vitte-sur-Briance (French pronunciation: [sɛ̃ vit syʁ bʁijɑ̃s], literally Saint-Vitte on Briance; Occitan: Sent Vit) is a commune in the Haute-Vienne department in the Nouvelle-Aquitaine region in west-central France.

== Geography ==
The river Briance flows northwestward through the commune.

== See also ==
- Communes of the Haute-Vienne department
