= Sussac =

- Commune
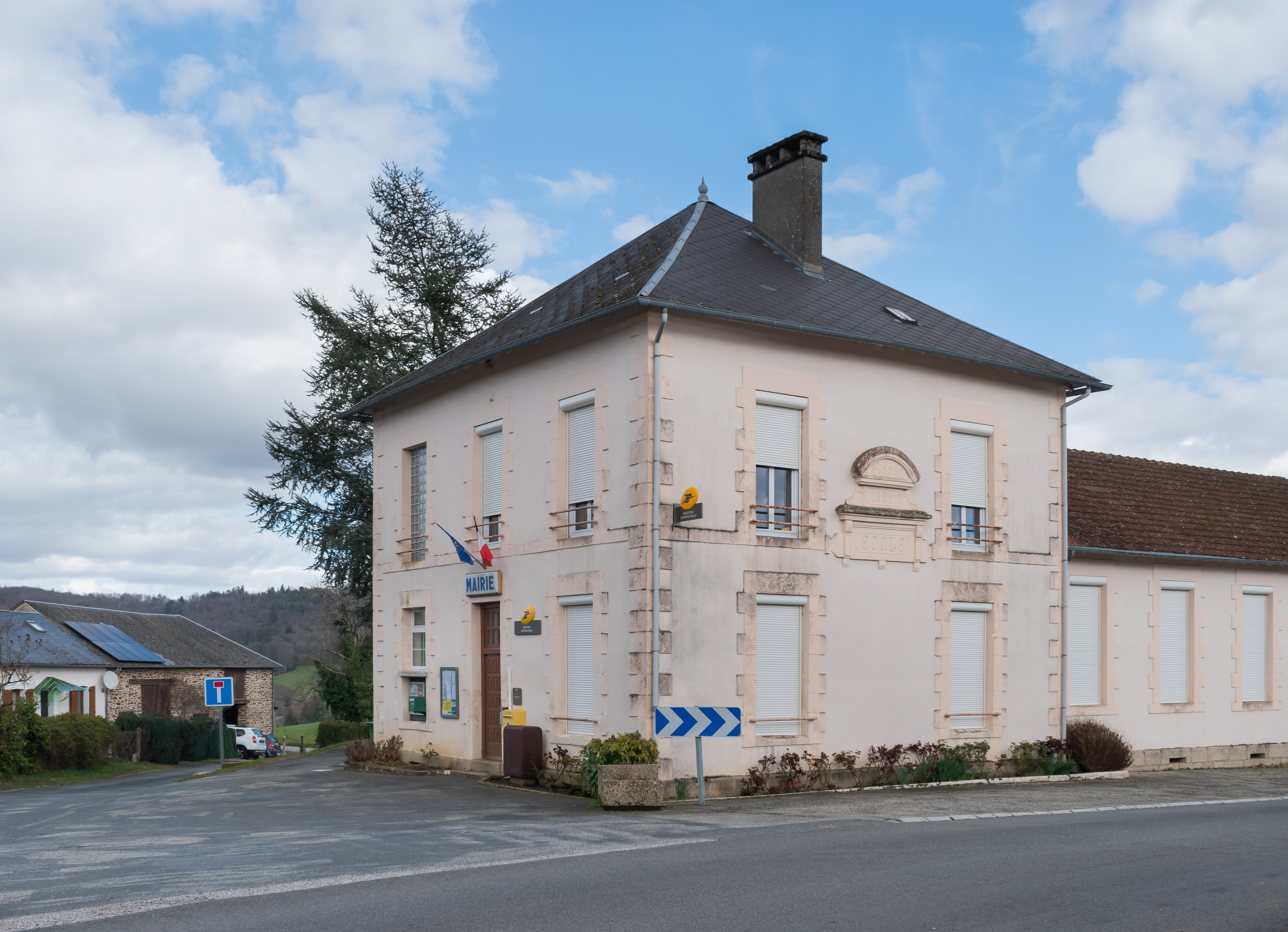
- Town hall of Sussac
- Location of Sussac
- Location within France Location within Nouvelle-Aquitaine
- Coordinates: 45°39′53″N 1°38′53″E
- Country: France
- Region: Nouvelle-Aquitaine
- Department: Haute-Vienne
- Arrondissement: Limoges
- Canton: Eymoutiers
- Intercommunality: Briance-Combade

Government
  - Mayor (2020–2026): Gilles Matinaud
- Area^{1}: 25.42 km^{2} (9.81 sq mi)
- Elevation: 500 m (1,600 ft)
- Highest elevation: 709 m (2,326 ft)
- Lowest elevation: 376 m (1,234 ft)
- Population (2023): 372
  - Density: 14.6/km^{2} (37.9/sq mi)
- Time zone: UTC+01:00 (CET)
  - Summer (DST): UTC+02:00 (CEST)
- INSEE/Postal code: 87194 /87130
- ^{1} French Land Register data, which excludes lakes, ponds, glaciers > 1 km^{2} (0.386 sq mi or 247 acres) and river estuaries.

Sussac (French pronunciation: [sysak]; Occitan: Suçac) is a commune in the Haute-Vienne department in the Nouvelle-Aquitaine region in west-central France.

It is also a local tourist resort offering lake, beach, play area and other amenities.

Geographically, Sussac is located between the capital towns of Limoges and Tulle, approximately 20 km (12 mi) from the A20 autoroute.

== Notable person ==
- Jean Cruveilhier (1791–1874), anatomist and pathologist, died in Sussac

== Demographics ==
Inhabitants are known as Sussacois.

== See also ==
- Communes of the Haute-Vienne department
