= Saint-Méard =

- Commune
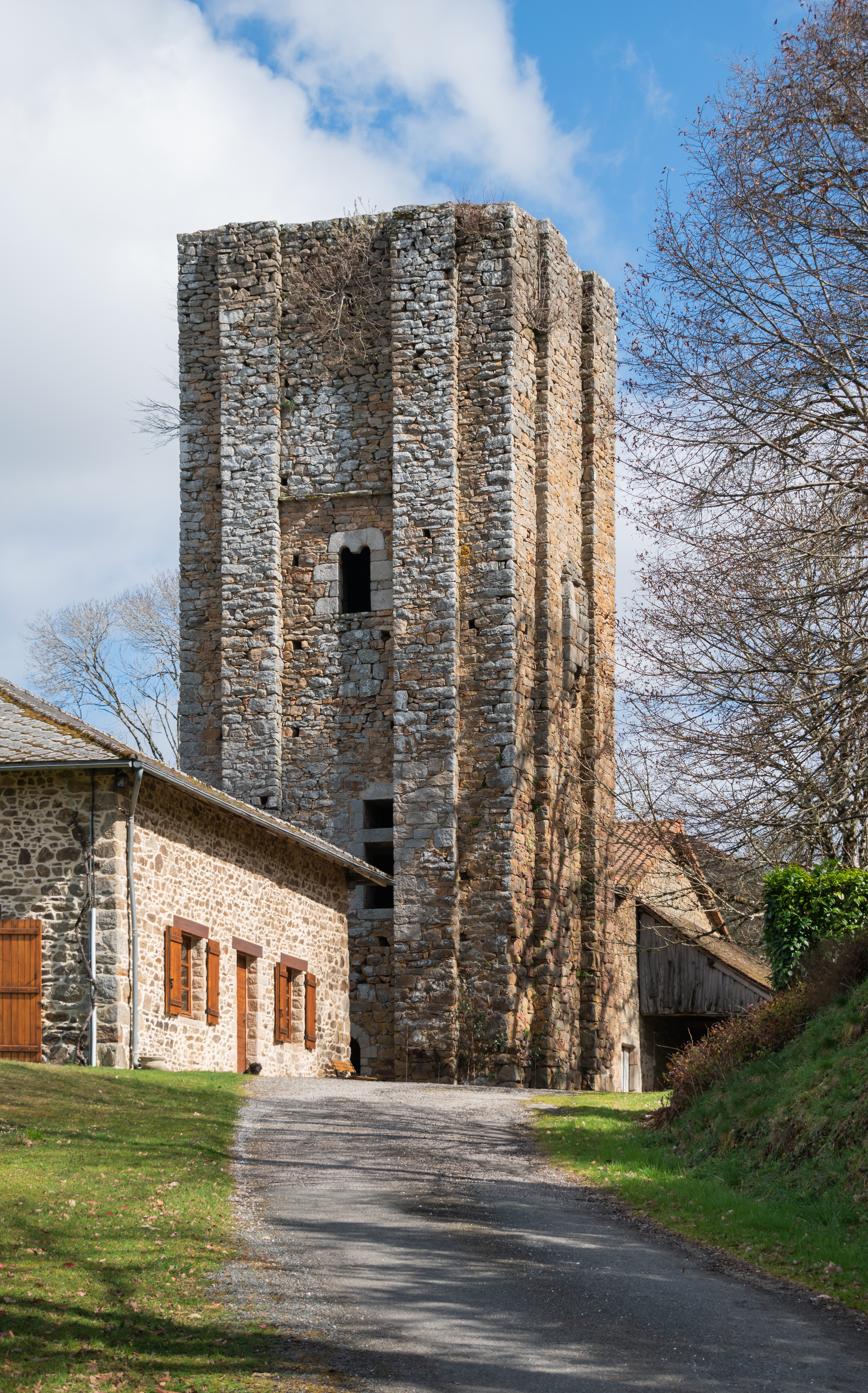
- The Échizadour Tower, in Saint-Méard
- Location of Saint-Méard
- Location within France Location within Nouvelle-Aquitaine
- Coordinates: 45°39′57″N 1°32′57″E
- Country: France
- Region: Nouvelle-Aquitaine
- Department: Haute-Vienne
- Arrondissement: Limoges
- Canton: Eymoutiers
- Intercommunality: Briance Combade

Government
  - Mayor (2020–2026): Henri Lavaud
- Area^{1}: 24.51 km^{2} (9.46 sq mi)
- Highest elevation: 560 m (1,840 ft)
- Lowest elevation: 330 m (1,080 ft)
- Population (2023): 366
  - Density: 14.9/km^{2} (38.7/sq mi)
- Time zone: UTC+01:00 (CET)
  - Summer (DST): UTC+02:00 (CEST)
- INSEE/Postal code: 87170 /87130
- ^{1} French Land Register data, which excludes lakes, ponds, glaciers > 1 km^{2} (0.386 sq mi or 247 acres) and river estuaries.

Saint-Méard (French pronunciation: [sɛ̃ meaʁ]; Occitan: Sent Mèrd) is a commune in the Haute-Vienne department in the Nouvelle-Aquitaine region in west-central France.

== Geography ==
The river Briance flows northwestward through the western part of the commune.

== See also ==
- Communes of the Haute-Vienne department
