= Meuzac =

- Commune
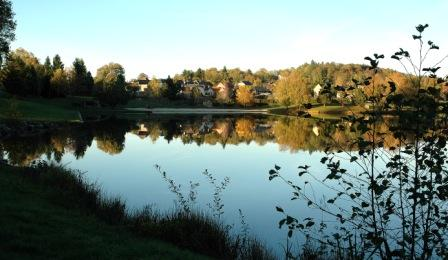
- Meuzac across La Roche Lake
- Location of Meuzac
- Location within France Location within Nouvelle-Aquitaine
- Coordinates: 45°33′15″N 1°26′29″E
- Country: France
- Region: Nouvelle-Aquitaine
- Department: Haute-Vienne
- Arrondissement: Limoges
- Canton: Eymoutiers

Government
  - Mayor (2020–2026): Guy Montet
- Area^{1}: 43.40 km^{2} (16.76 sq mi)
- Highest elevation: 495 m (1,624 ft)
- Lowest elevation: 324 m (1,063 ft)
- Population (2023): 743
  - Density: 17.1/km^{2} (44.3/sq mi)
- Time zone: UTC+01:00 (CET)
  - Summer (DST): UTC+02:00 (CEST)
- INSEE/Postal code: 87095 /87380
- ^{1} French Land Register data, which excludes lakes, ponds, glaciers > 1 km^{2} (0.386 sq mi or 247 acres) and river estuaries.

Meuzac (French pronunciation: [møzak]; Occitan: Meusac) is a commune in the Haute-Vienne department in the Nouvelle-Aquitaine region in west-central France.

Inhabitants are known as Meuzacois and Meuzacoises.

== Geography ==
The town lies on an ancient granite bedrock (quarries of pink granite, called "Meuzac Stone") dug through the valleys of the Boucheuse and its tributary stream, the Roubardie (Garonne river basin), which respectively feed the two main water bodies of the municipality: Forgeneuve lake and La Roche lake, also called "Lac du Syndicat d'Initiative".

Presence of serpentine outcrops on the moors of Cluzeau and La Flotte (on Meuzac and Chateau-Chervix).

== History ==
Meuzac is the only town in France with that name. There are various spellings in the ancient texts (Melsac eleventh century, then Mensac). The Latin etymology comes from the name of a man: Meletius.

Presence of pre-historic, Roman and Gallo-Roman remains.

The origin of the town is probably due to the exploitation of gold mines (quartz and gold ore). The few last gold mines still present in the early twentieth century have been abandoned by lack of sustainability, and recent surveys by sampling (1980) have demonstrated the non-viability of this operation under current methods.

The relay of the economic viability of the settlement was mainly due to agricultural and forestry activities: livestock, chestnut and small polyculture for food. There is evidence of the presence of ancient crafts (ironworks, brickworks).

Record the existence of a "Maison Hospitalière".

== Places of interest and monuments ==
The Romanesque church, rebuilt in the seventeenth century, devoted to St. Peter-ad-Vincula, which twelfth-century chancel is presumably the oldest in the Limousin region, has two very original square towers, one over the apse and another on the west portal.

Remains of a priory of the Order of Grandmont (monastic cell) at the village of Le Cluzeau.

The La Roche lake, or Lac du Syndicat d'Initiative, is ranked first category for leisure.

The Forgeneuve lake is a Mecca for waterskiing in France.

== See also ==
- Communes of the Haute-Vienne department
