= Surdoux =

- Commune
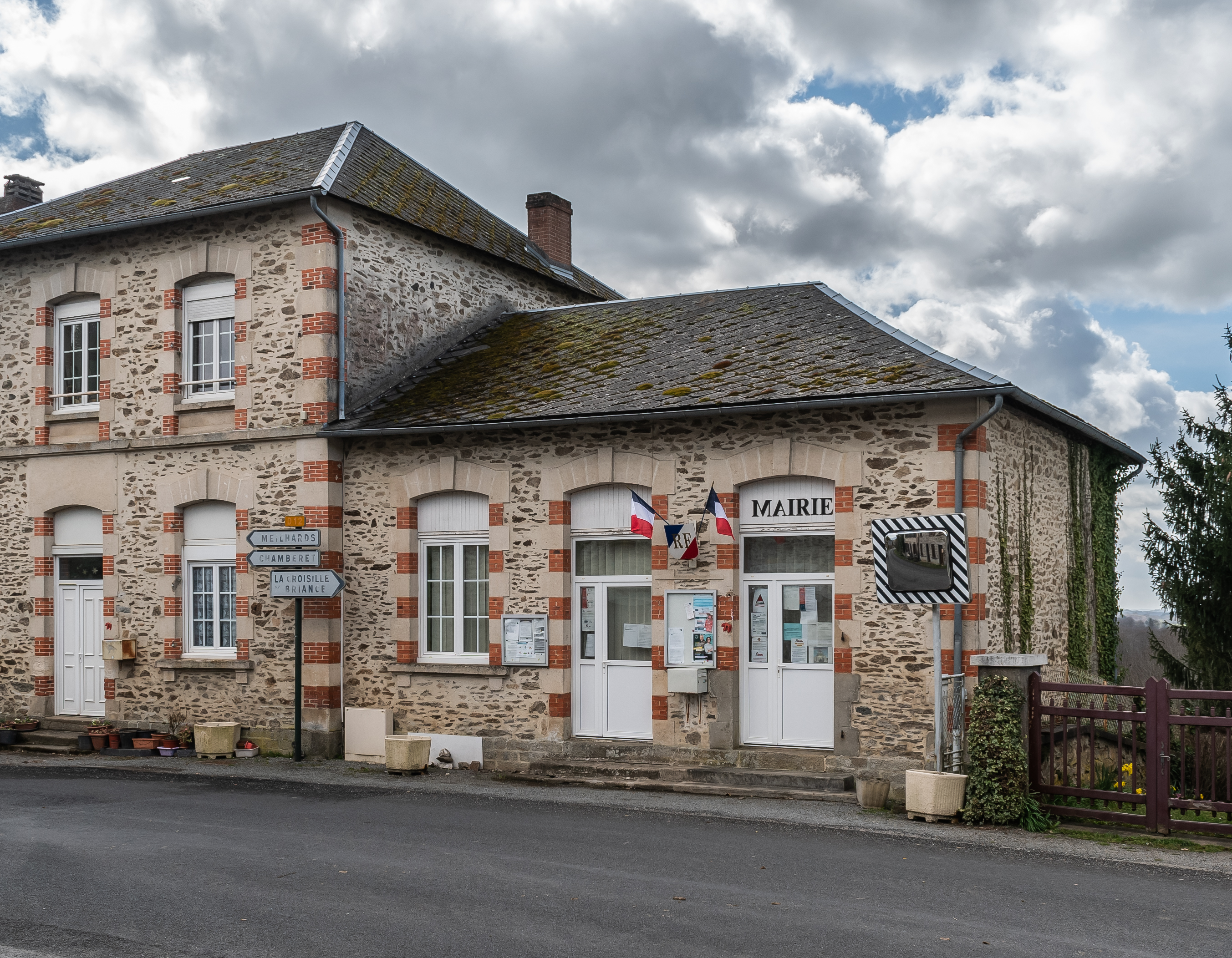
- Town hall of Surdoux
- Location of Surdoux
- Location within France Location within Nouvelle-Aquitaine
- Coordinates: 45°36′23″N 1°39′04″E
- Country: France
- Region: Nouvelle-Aquitaine
- Department: Haute-Vienne
- Arrondissement: Limoges
- Canton: Eymoutiers
- Intercommunality: Briance-Combade

Government
  - Mayor (2024–2026): Christine Burin
- Area^{1}: 3.88 km^{2} (1.50 sq mi)
- Highest elevation: 689 m (2,260 ft)
- Lowest elevation: 460 m (1,510 ft)
- Population (2023): 59
  - Density: 15/km^{2} (39/sq mi)
- Time zone: UTC+01:00 (CET)
  - Summer (DST): UTC+02:00 (CEST)
- INSEE/Postal code: 87193 /87130
- ^{1} French Land Register data, which excludes lakes, ponds, glaciers > 1 km^{2} (0.386 sq mi or 247 acres) and river estuaries.

Surdoux (French pronunciation: [syʁdu]; Occitan: Surdòu) is a commune in the Haute-Vienne department in the Nouvelle-Aquitaine region in west-central France.

== See also ==
- Communes of the Haute-Vienne department
