= Sainte-Anne-Saint-Priest =

- Commune
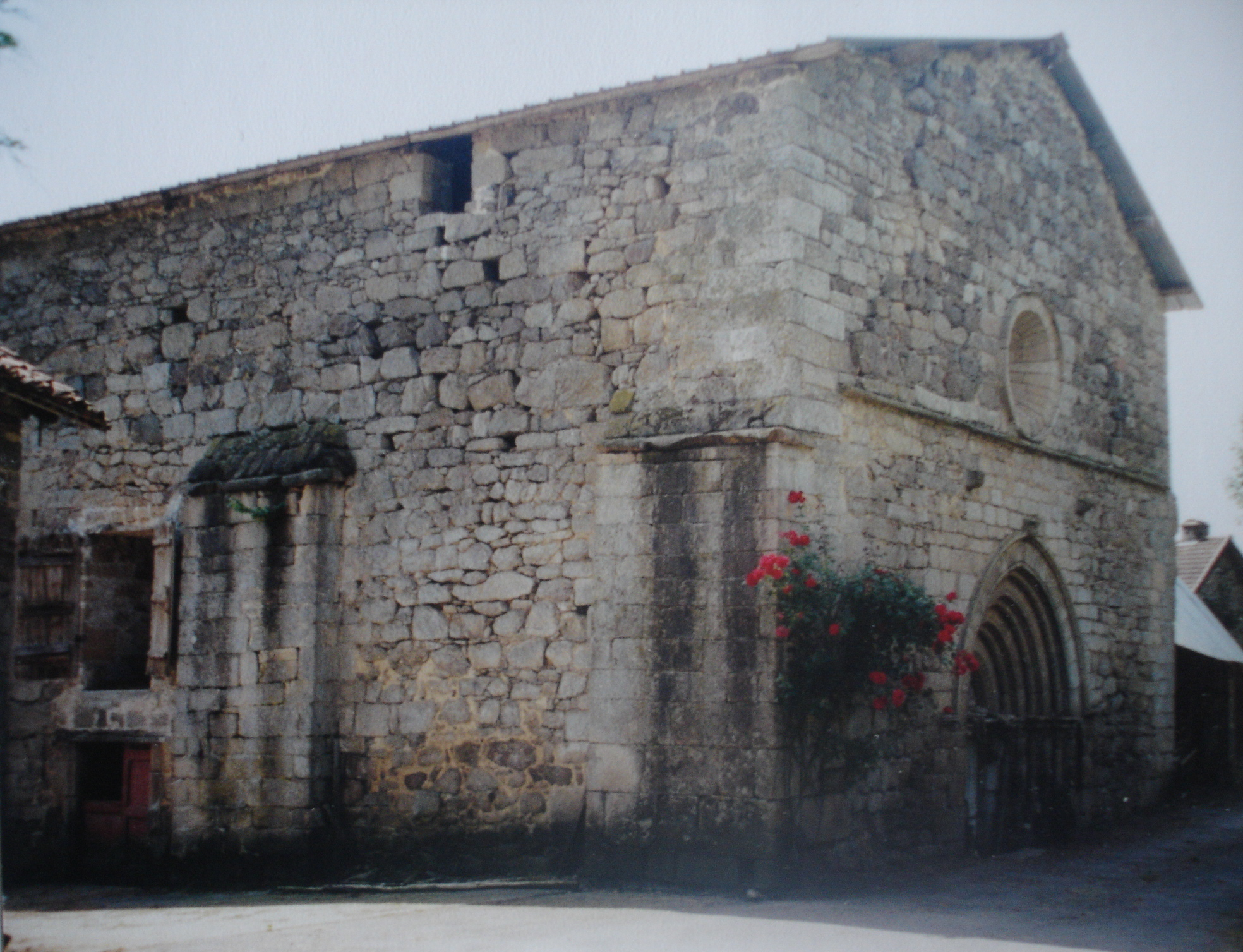
- The church-priory of Villevaleix, in Sainte-Anne-Saint-Priest
- Location of Sainte-Anne-Saint-Priest
- Location within France Location within Nouvelle-Aquitaine
- Coordinates: 45°42′33″N 1°41′01″E
- Country: France
- Region: Nouvelle-Aquitaine
- Department: Haute-Vienne
- Arrondissement: Limoges
- Canton: Eymoutiers
- Intercommunality: Portes de Vassivière

Government
  - Mayor (2020–2026): Thierry Muzette
- Area^{1}: 16.54 km^{2} (6.39 sq mi)
- Highest elevation: 638 m (2,093 ft)
- Lowest elevation: 372 m (1,220 ft)
- Population (2023): 137
  - Density: 8.28/km^{2} (21.5/sq mi)
- Time zone: UTC+01:00 (CET)
  - Summer (DST): UTC+02:00 (CEST)
- INSEE/Postal code: 87134 /87120
- ^{1} French Land Register data, which excludes lakes, ponds, glaciers > 1 km^{2} (0.386 sq mi or 247 acres) and river estuaries.

Sainte-Anne-Saint-Priest (French pronunciation: [sɛ̃t an sɛ̃ pʁijɛ(st)]; Occitan: Senta Anna-Sent Príech) is a commune in the Haute-Vienne department in the Nouvelle-Aquitaine region in west-central France.

== See also ==
- Communes of the Haute-Vienne department
