= Cheissoux =

- Commune
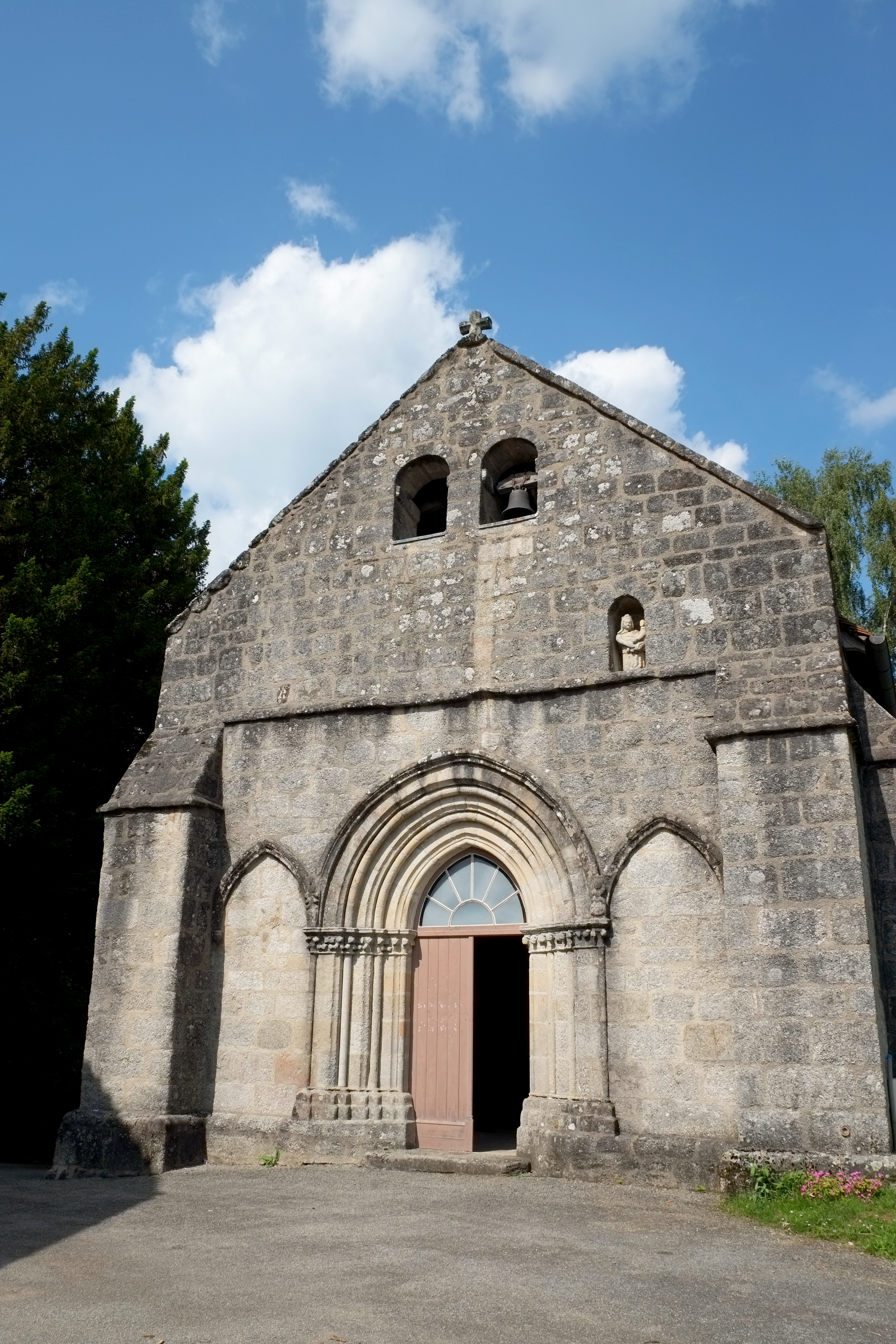
- The church of the Nativity of the Virgin, in Cheissoux

- Coat of arms
- Location of Cheissoux
- Location within France Location within Nouvelle-Aquitaine
- Coordinates: 45°50′03″N 1°38′57″E
- Country: France
- Region: Nouvelle-Aquitaine
- Department: Haute-Vienne
- Arrondissement: Limoges
- Canton: Eymoutiers
- Intercommunality: Portes de Vassivière

Government
  - Mayor (2023–2026): Vincent Echasserieau
- Area^{1}: 10.21 km^{2} (3.94 sq mi)
- Highest elevation: 548 m (1,798 ft)
- Lowest elevation: 334 m (1,096 ft)
- Population (2023): 231
  - Density: 22.6/km^{2} (58.6/sq mi)
- Time zone: UTC+01:00 (CET)
  - Summer (DST): UTC+02:00 (CEST)
- INSEE/Postal code: 87043 /87460
- ^{1} French Land Register data, which excludes lakes, ponds, glaciers > 1 km^{2} (0.386 sq mi or 247 acres) and river estuaries.

Cheissoux (French pronunciation: [ʃɛsu]; Occitan: Chaisson la Chapèla) is a commune in the Haute-Vienne department in the Nouvelle-Aquitaine region in western France.

== See also ==
- Communes of the Haute-Vienne department
