= Châteauneuf-la-Forêt =

Châteauneuf-la-Forêt Chasteu Nuòu (Occitan)
- Commune
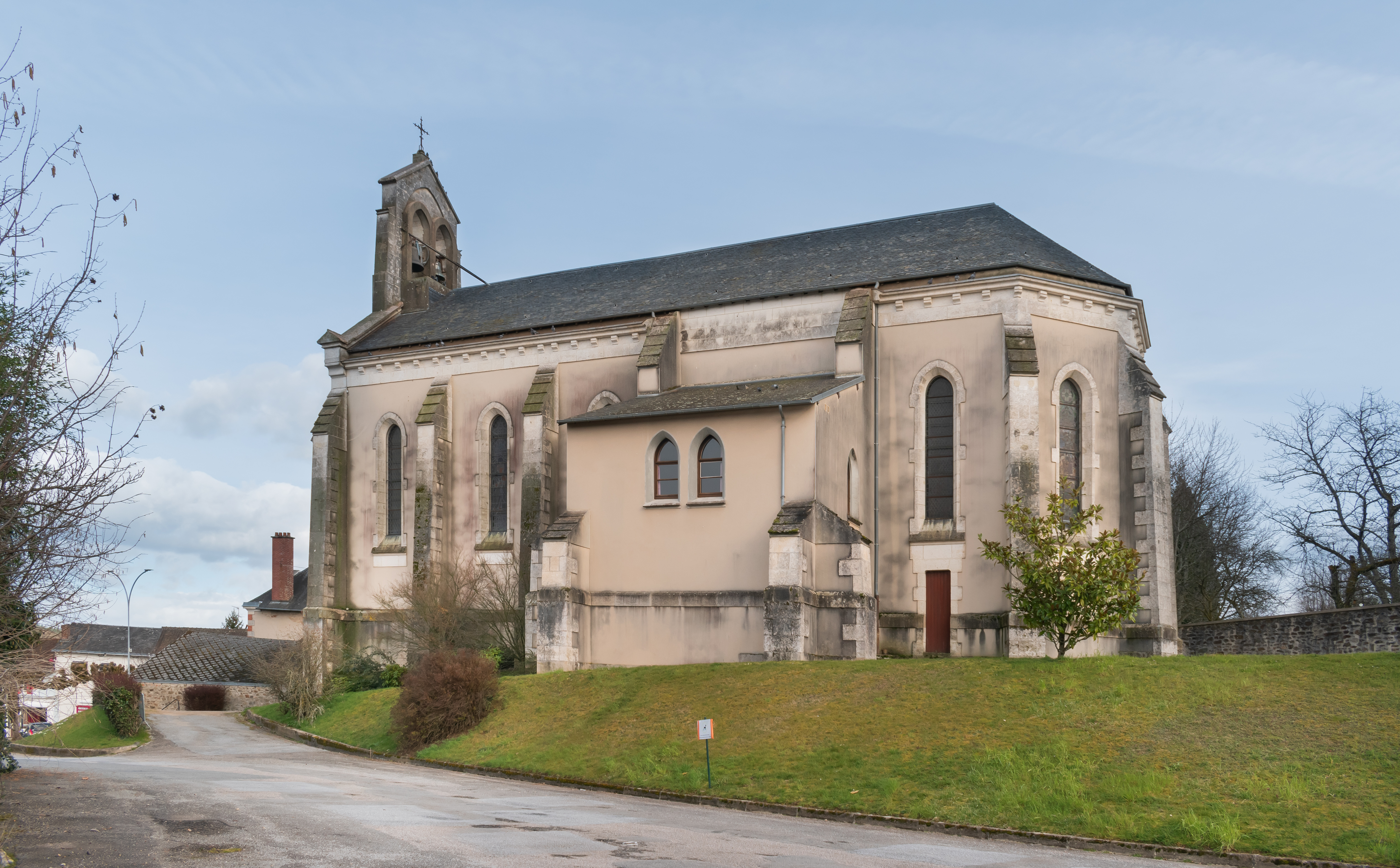
- St Mary church in Châteauneuf-la-Forêt

- Coat of arms
- Location of Châteauneuf-la-Forêt
- Location within France Location within Nouvelle-Aquitaine
- Coordinates: 45°42′50″N 1°36′25″E
- Country: France
- Region: Nouvelle-Aquitaine
- Department: Haute-Vienne
- Arrondissement: Limoges
- Canton: Eymoutiers
- Intercommunality: Briance-Combade

Government
  - Mayor (2020–2026): Françoise Rivet
- Area^{1}: 29.25 km^{2} (11.29 sq mi)
- Highest elevation: 644 m (2,113 ft)
- Lowest elevation: 336 m (1,102 ft)
- Population (2023): 1,542
  - Density: 52.72/km^{2} (136.5/sq mi)
- Time zone: UTC+01:00 (CET)
  - Summer (DST): UTC+02:00 (CEST)
- INSEE/Postal code: 87040 /87130
- ^{1} French Land Register data, which excludes lakes, ponds, glaciers > 1 km^{2} (0.386 sq mi or 247 acres) and river estuaries.

Châteauneuf-la-Forêt (French: [ʃɑtonœf la fɔʁɛ]; Occitan: Chasteu Nuòu) is a commune in the Haute-Vienne department in the Nouvelle-Aquitaine region in western France.

Inhabitants are known as Castelneuviens in French.

== See also ==
- Communes of the Haute-Vienne department
