= Nedde =

- Commune
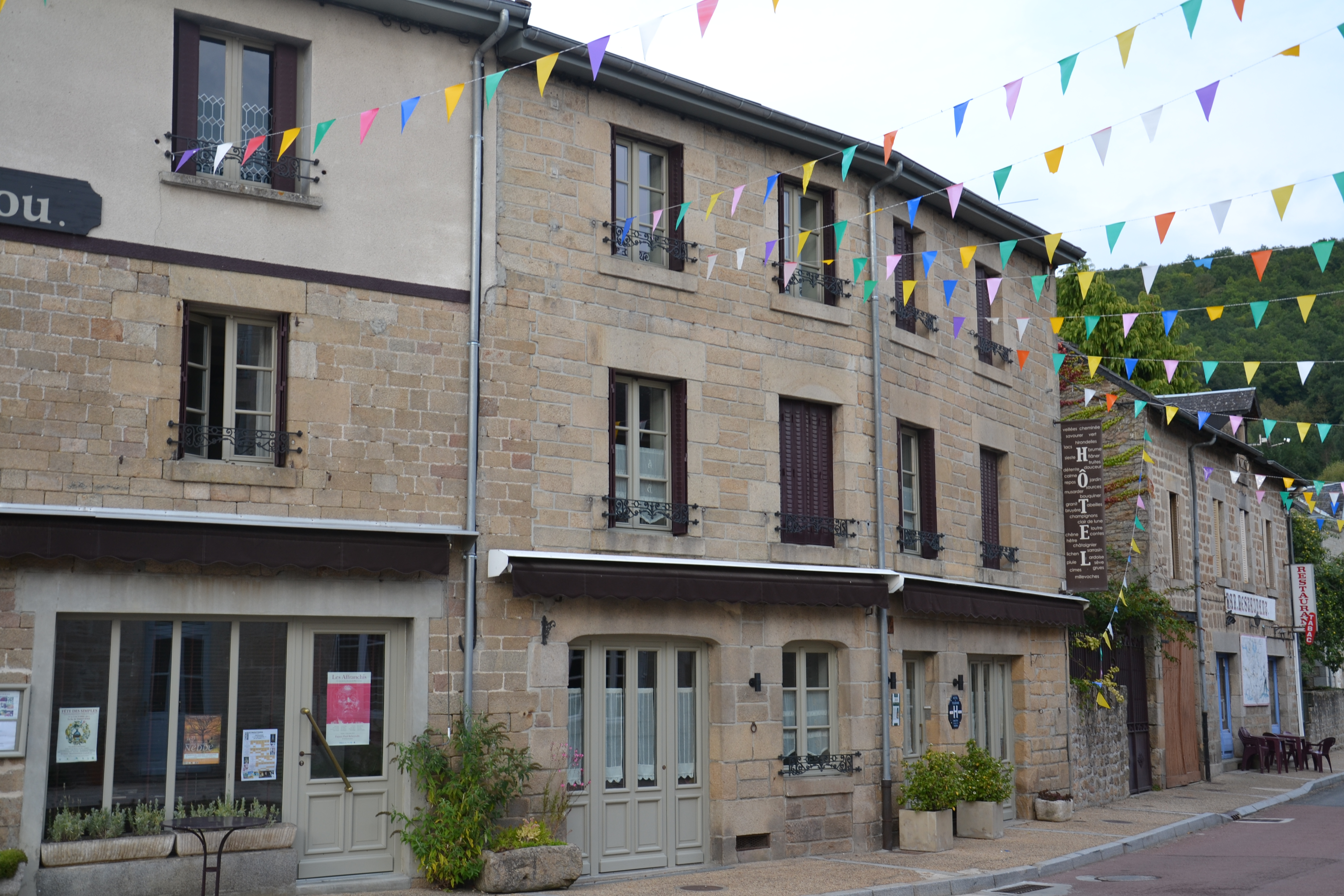
- Houses in the centre of the village of Nedde
- Location of Nedde
- Location within France Location within Nouvelle-Aquitaine
- Coordinates: 45°43′13″N 1°49′56″E
- Country: France
- Region: Nouvelle-Aquitaine
- Department: Haute-Vienne
- Arrondissement: Limoges
- Canton: Eymoutiers
- Intercommunality: Portes de Vassivière

Government
  - Mayor (2020–2026): Monique Lenoble
- Area^{1}: 52.73 km^{2} (20.36 sq mi)
- Highest elevation: 754 m (2,474 ft)
- Lowest elevation: 431 m (1,414 ft)
- Population (2023): 450
  - Density: 8.5/km^{2} (22/sq mi)
- Time zone: UTC+01:00 (CET)
  - Summer (DST): UTC+02:00 (CEST)
- INSEE/Postal code: 87104 /87120
- ^{1} French Land Register data, which excludes lakes, ponds, glaciers > 1 km^{2} (0.386 sq mi or 247 acres) and river estuaries.

Nedde (French pronunciation: [nɛd]; Occitan: Neda) is a commune in the Haute-Vienne department in the Nouvelle-Aquitaine region in west-central France.

Inhabitants are known as Neddois.

== See also ==
- Communes of the Haute-Vienne department
