= Domps =

- Commune
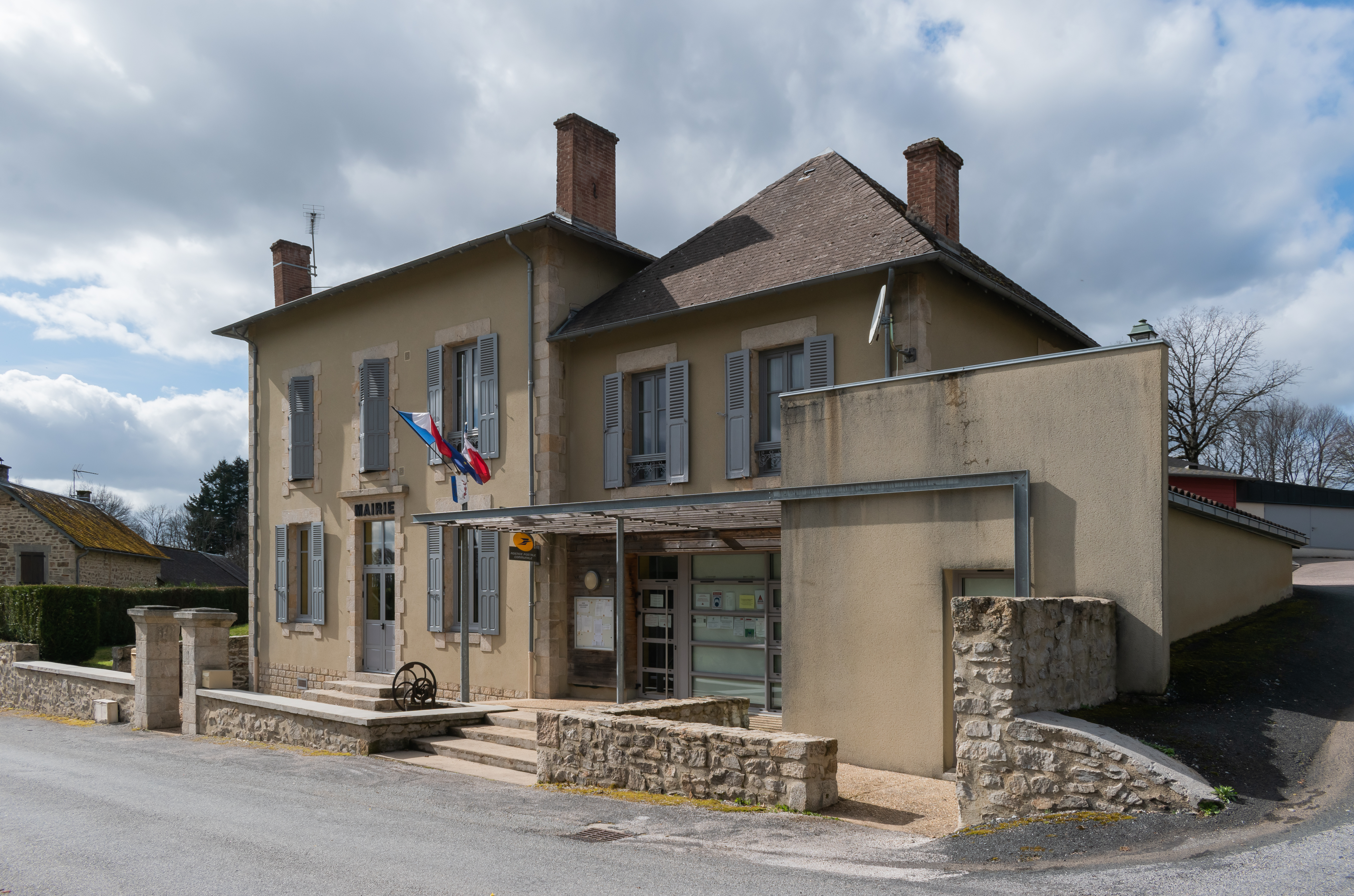
- Town hall of Domps
- Location of Domps
- Location within France Location within Nouvelle-Aquitaine
- Coordinates: 45°39′40″N 1°42′33″E
- Country: France
- Region: Nouvelle-Aquitaine
- Department: Haute-Vienne
- Arrondissement: Limoges
- Canton: Eymoutiers
- Intercommunality: Portes de Vassivière

Government
  - Mayor (2020–2026): Coline Bour
- Area^{1}: 13.54 km^{2} (5.23 sq mi)
- Highest elevation: 666 m (2,185 ft)
- Lowest elevation: 413 m (1,355 ft)
- Population (2023): 98
  - Density: 7.2/km^{2} (19/sq mi)
- Time zone: UTC+01:00 (CET)
  - Summer (DST): UTC+02:00 (CEST)
- INSEE/Postal code: 87058 /87120
- ^{1} French Land Register data, which excludes lakes, ponds, glaciers > 1 km^{2} (0.386 sq mi or 247 acres) and river estuaries.

Domps (Occitan: Doms) is a commune in the Haute-Vienne department in the Nouvelle-Aquitaine region in western France. The writer and Resistant Jean Blanzat (1906–1977) was born in Domps.

Inhabitants are known as Dompsois and Dompsoises in French.

The Dompstomp is a traditional dance, performed by the Dompsois during the wine grape harvest.

== See also ==
- Communes of the Haute-Vienne department
