= Magnac-Bourg =

- Commune
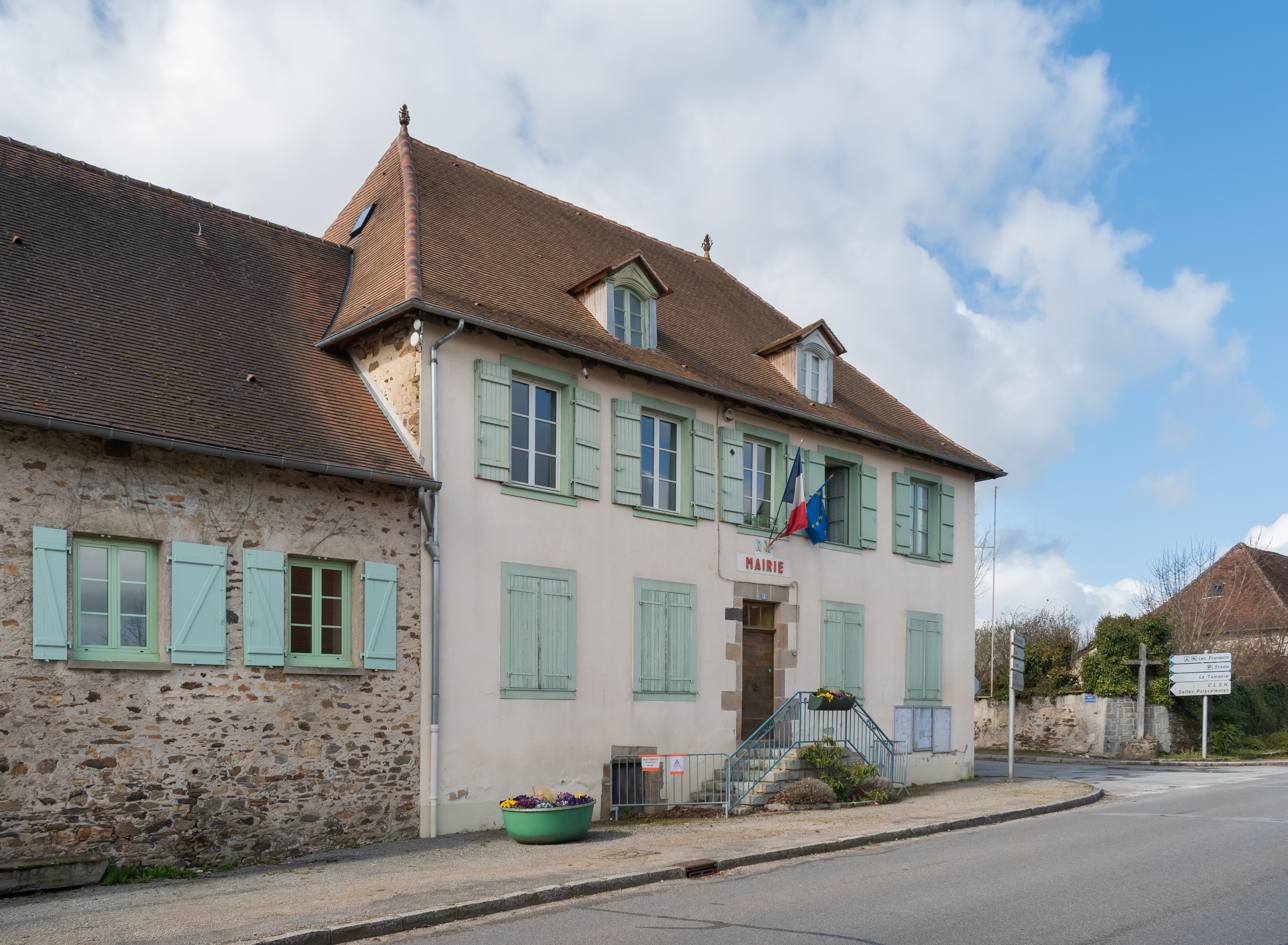
- Town hall of Magnac-Bourg

- Coat of arms
- Location of Magnac-Bourg
- Location within France Location within Nouvelle-Aquitaine
- Coordinates: 45°37′05″N 1°25′55″E
- Country: France
- Region: Nouvelle-Aquitaine
- Department: Haute-Vienne
- Arrondissement: Limoges
- Canton: Eymoutiers
- Intercommunality: Briance Sud Haute-Vienne

Government
  - Mayor (2020–2026): Jean-Louis Dubois
- Area^{1}: 15.11 km^{2} (5.83 sq mi)
- Highest elevation: 477 m (1,565 ft)
- Lowest elevation: 374 m (1,227 ft)
- Population (2023): 1,121
  - Density: 74.19/km^{2} (192.1/sq mi)
- Time zone: UTC+01:00 (CET)
  - Summer (DST): UTC+02:00 (CEST)
- INSEE/Postal code: 87088 /87380
- ^{1} French Land Register data, which excludes lakes, ponds, glaciers > 1 km^{2} (0.386 sq mi or 247 acres) and river estuaries.

Magnac-Bourg (French pronunciation: [maɲak buʁ]; Occitan: Manhac) is a commune in the Haute-Vienne department in the Nouvelle-Aquitaine region in west-central France. Magnac-Vicq station has rail connections to Brive-la-Gaillarde and Limoges.

The commune is listed as a Village étape.

== See also ==
- Communes of the Haute-Vienne department
