= Peyrat-le-Château =

Peyrat-le-Château Pairac lo Chasteu (Occitan)
- Commune
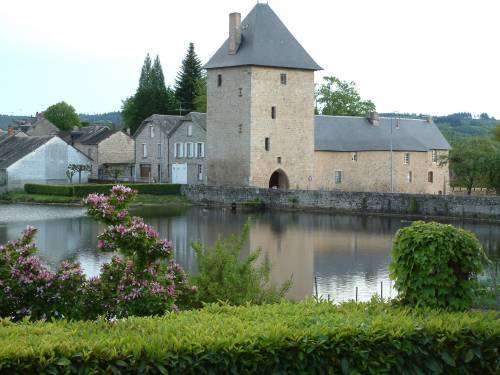
- The Château of Peyrat-le-Château

- Coat of arms
- Location of Peyrat-le-Château
- Location within France Location within Nouvelle-Aquitaine
- Coordinates: 45°48′49″N 1°46′25″E
- Country: France
- Region: Nouvelle-Aquitaine
- Department: Haute-Vienne
- Arrondissement: Limoges
- Canton: Eymoutiers
- Intercommunality: Portes de Vassivière

Government
  - Mayor (2026–32): Marie-France Mazaud Wittmann
- Area^{1}: 52.96 km^{2} (20.45 sq mi)
- Highest elevation: 776 m (2,546 ft)
- Lowest elevation: 390 m (1,280 ft)
- Population (2023): 1,025
  - Density: 19.35/km^{2} (50.13/sq mi)
- Time zone: UTC+01:00 (CET)
  - Summer (DST): UTC+02:00 (CEST)
- INSEE/Postal code: 87117 /87470
- ^{1} French Land Register data, which excludes lakes, ponds, glaciers > 1 km^{2} (0.386 sq mi or 247 acres) and river estuaries.

Peyrat-le-Château (French: [pɛʁa lə ʃɑto]; Occitan: Pairac lo Chasteu) is a commune in the Haute-Vienne department in the Nouvelle-Aquitaine region in west-central France.

Inhabitants are known as Peyratois or Castel Peyratois in French.

== Notable people ==
- Gilles Lalay (1962–1992), motorcycle enduro and rally raid competitor

== See also ==
- Communes of the Haute-Vienne department
