= Augne =

- Commune
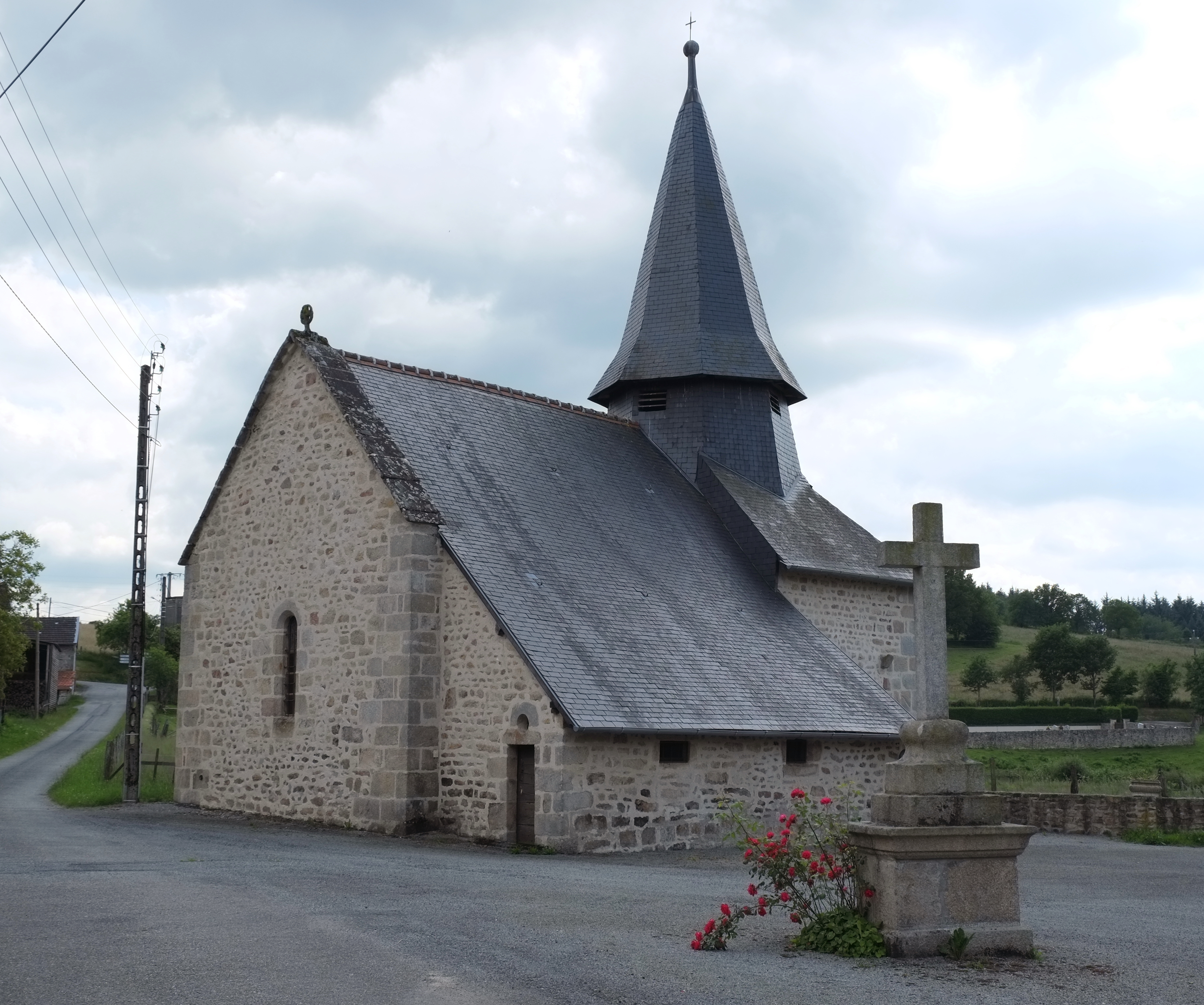
- The church of Saint-Pierre, in Augne

- Coat of arms
- Location of Augne
- Location within France Location within Nouvelle-Aquitaine
- Coordinates: 45°47′04″N 1°42′20″E
- Country: France
- Region: Nouvelle-Aquitaine
- Department: Haute-Vienne
- Arrondissement: Limoges
- Canton: Eymoutiers
- Intercommunality: CC Portes Vassivière

Government
  - Mayor (2021–2026): Marc Champaud
- Area^{1}: 17.59 km^{2} (6.79 sq mi)
- Highest elevation: 614 m (2,014 ft)
- Lowest elevation: 314 m (1,030 ft)
- Population (2023): 126
  - Density: 7.16/km^{2} (18.6/sq mi)
- Time zone: UTC+01:00 (CET)
  - Summer (DST): UTC+02:00 (CEST)
- INSEE/Postal code: 87004 /87120
- ^{1} French Land Register data, which excludes lakes, ponds, glaciers > 1 km^{2} (0.386 sq mi or 247 acres) and river estuaries.

Augne (French pronunciation: [oɲ]; Occitan: Ònha) is a commune in the Haute-Vienne department in the Nouvelle-Aquitaine region in central-western France.

== See also ==
- Communes of the Haute-Vienne department
