= Bujaleuf =

- Commune
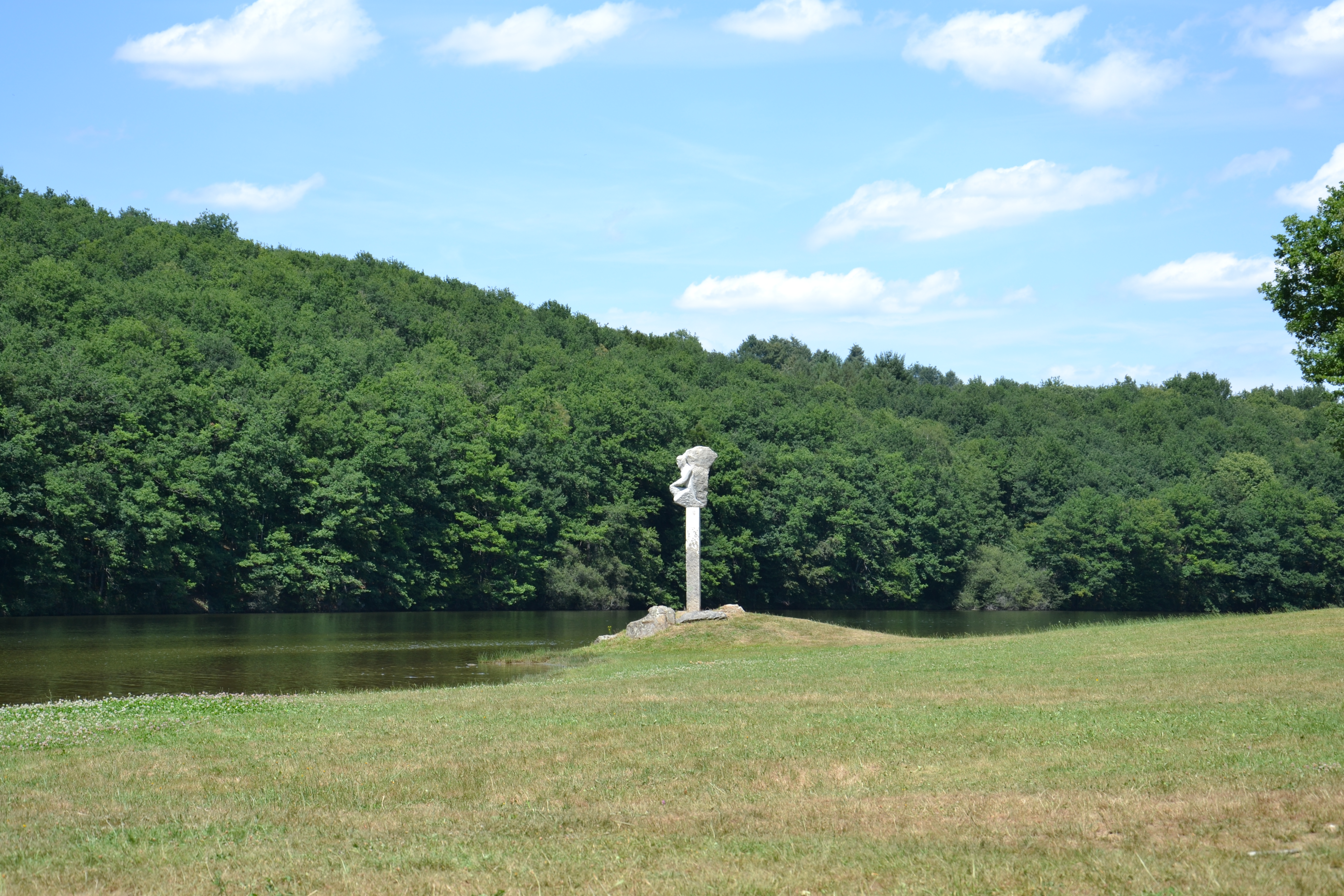
- The Sainte-Hélène Lake, in Bujaleuf

- Coat of arms
- Location of Bujaleuf
- Location within France Location within Nouvelle-Aquitaine
- Coordinates: 45°47′51″N 1°37′50″E
- Country: France
- Region: Nouvelle-Aquitaine
- Department: Haute-Vienne
- Arrondissement: Limoges
- Canton: Eymoutiers
- Intercommunality: Portes de Vassivière

Government
  - Mayor (2020–2026): Jean-Michel Bidaud
- Area^{1}: 41.17 km^{2} (15.90 sq mi)
- Highest elevation: 536 m (1,759 ft)
- Lowest elevation: 290 m (950 ft)
- Population (2023): 869
  - Density: 21.1/km^{2} (54.7/sq mi)
- Time zone: UTC+01:00 (CET)
  - Summer (DST): UTC+02:00 (CEST)
- INSEE/Postal code: 87024 /87460
- ^{1} French Land Register data, which excludes lakes, ponds, glaciers > 1 km^{2} (0.386 sq mi or 247 acres) and river estuaries.

Bujaleuf (French pronunciation: [byʒalœf]; Occitan: Bujaleu) is a commune in the Haute-Vienne department in the Nouvelle-Aquitaine region in western France.

== See also ==
- Communes of the Haute-Vienne department
