= Glanges =

- Commune
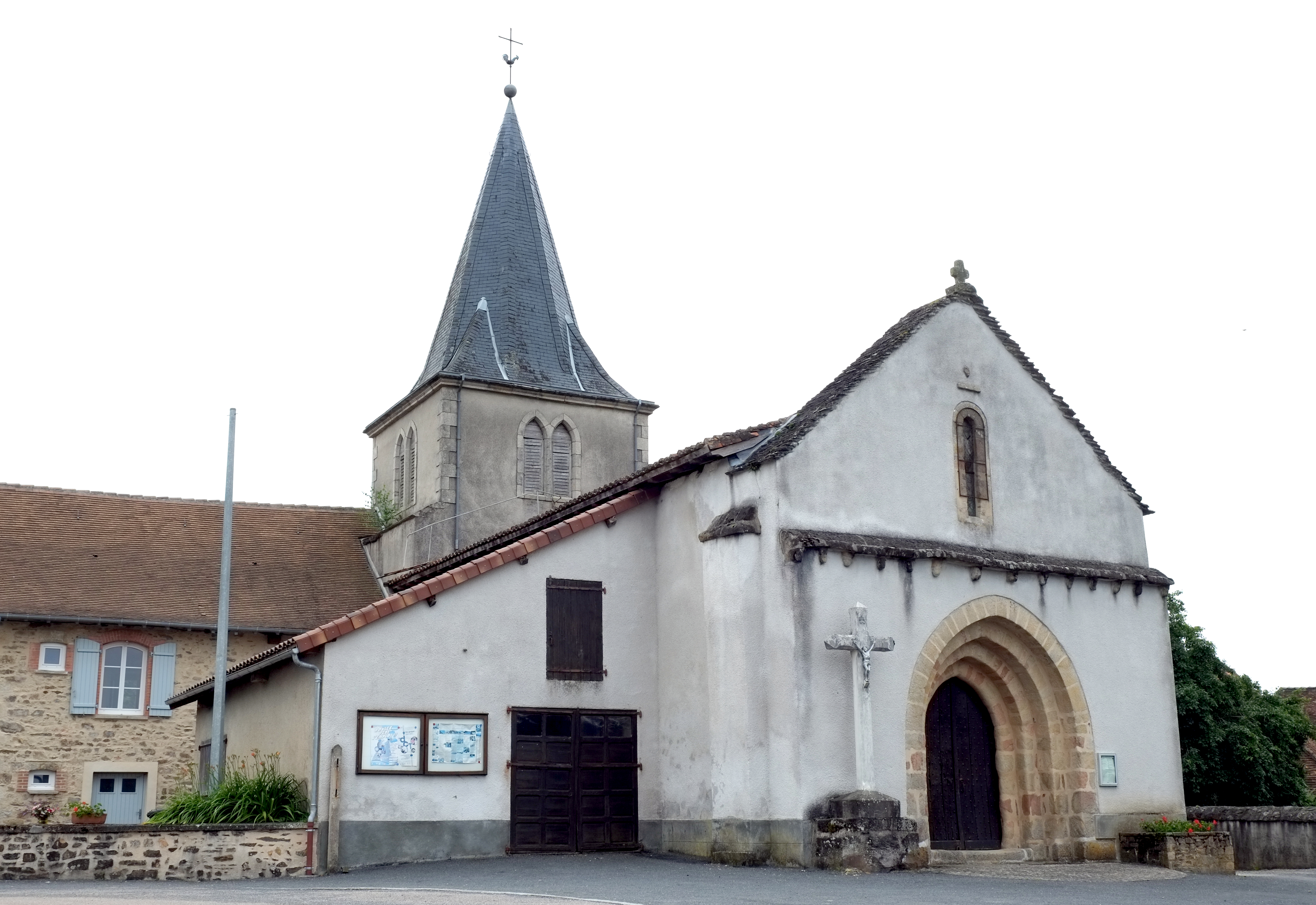
- The church in Glanges
- Location of Glanges
- Location within France Location within Nouvelle-Aquitaine
- Coordinates: 45°40′16″N 1°27′14″E
- Country: France
- Region: Nouvelle-Aquitaine
- Department: Haute-Vienne
- Arrondissement: Limoges
- Canton: Eymoutiers

Government
  - Mayor (2020–2026): Emilie Gillet
- Area^{1}: 22.85 km^{2} (8.82 sq mi)
- Highest elevation: 456 m (1,496 ft)
- Lowest elevation: 290 m (950 ft)
- Population (2023): 516
  - Density: 22.6/km^{2} (58.5/sq mi)
- Time zone: UTC+01:00 (CET)
  - Summer (DST): UTC+02:00 (CEST)
- INSEE/Postal code: 87072 /87380
- ^{1} French Land Register data, which excludes lakes, ponds, glaciers > 1 km^{2} (0.386 sq mi or 247 acres) and river estuaries.

Glanges (French pronunciation: [ɡlɑ̃ʒ]; Occitan: Glanjas) is a commune in the Haute-Vienne department in the Nouvelle-Aquitaine region in west-central France.

== Geography ==
The river Briance flows west through the northern part of the commune and forms part of its northeastern and northwestern borders.

== See also ==
- Communes of the Haute-Vienne department
