= Saint-Amand-le-Petit =

- Commune
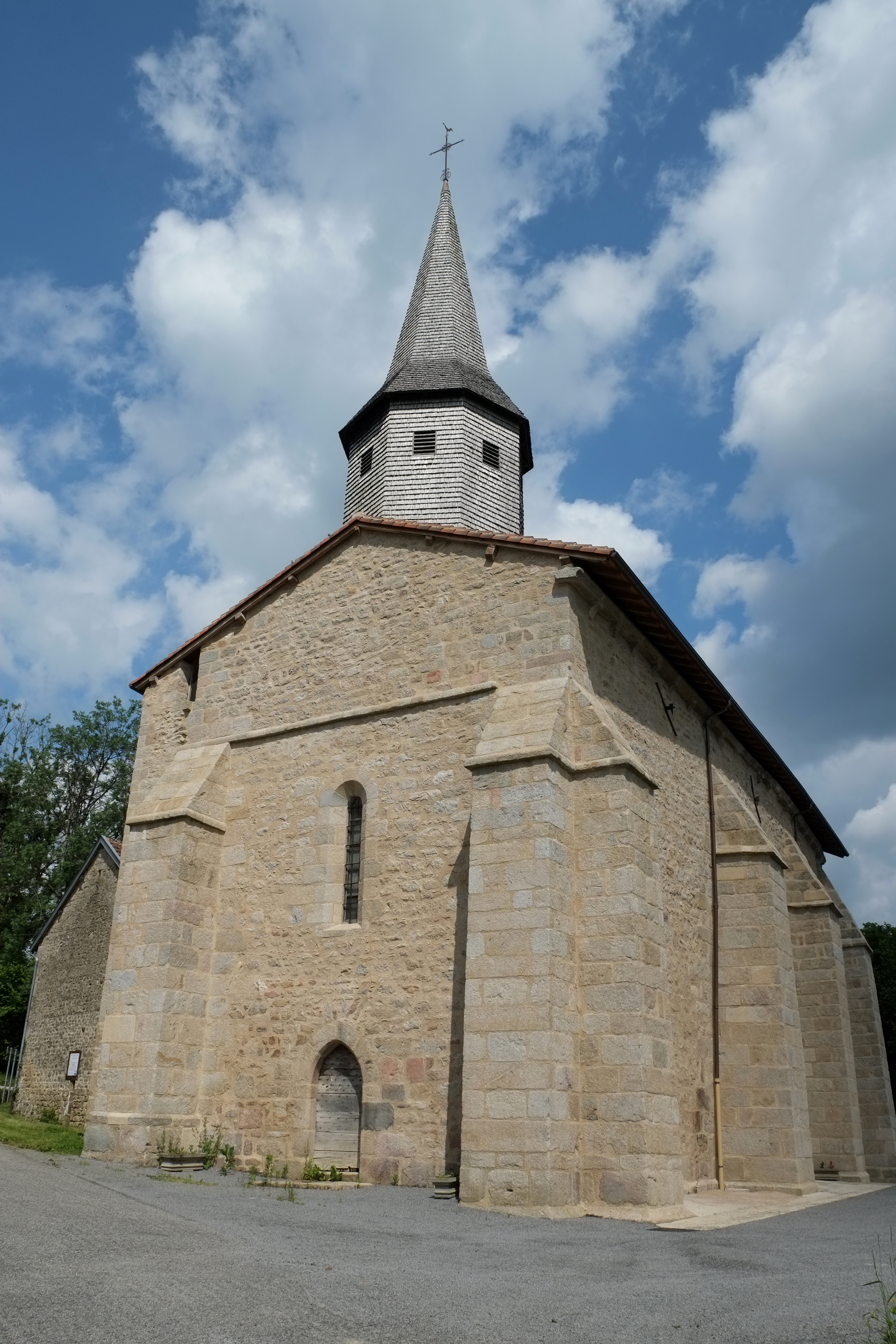
- The church of Saint-Amand, in Saint-Amand-le-Petit
- Location of Saint-Amand-le-Petit
- Location within France Location within Nouvelle-Aquitaine
- Coordinates: 45°46′32″N 1°45′08″E
- Country: France
- Region: Nouvelle-Aquitaine
- Department: Haute-Vienne
- Arrondissement: Limoges
- Canton: Eymoutiers
- Intercommunality: Portes de Vassivière

Government
  - Mayor (2020–2026): Christian Leblanc
- Area^{1}: 15.31 km^{2} (5.91 sq mi)
- Highest elevation: 718 m (2,356 ft)
- Lowest elevation: 446 m (1,463 ft)
- Population (2023): 115
  - Density: 7.51/km^{2} (19.5/sq mi)
- Time zone: UTC+01:00 (CET)
  - Summer (DST): UTC+02:00 (CEST)
- INSEE/Postal code: 87132 /87120
- ^{1} French Land Register data, which excludes lakes, ponds, glaciers > 1 km^{2} (0.386 sq mi or 247 acres) and river estuaries.

Saint-Amand-le-Petit (French pronunciation: [sɛ̃.t‿amɑ̃ lə pəti]; Occitan: Sent Amand) is a commune in the Haute-Vienne department in the Nouvelle-Aquitaine region in west-central France.

== See also ==
- Communes of the Haute-Vienne department
