= Beaumont-du-Lac =

- Commune
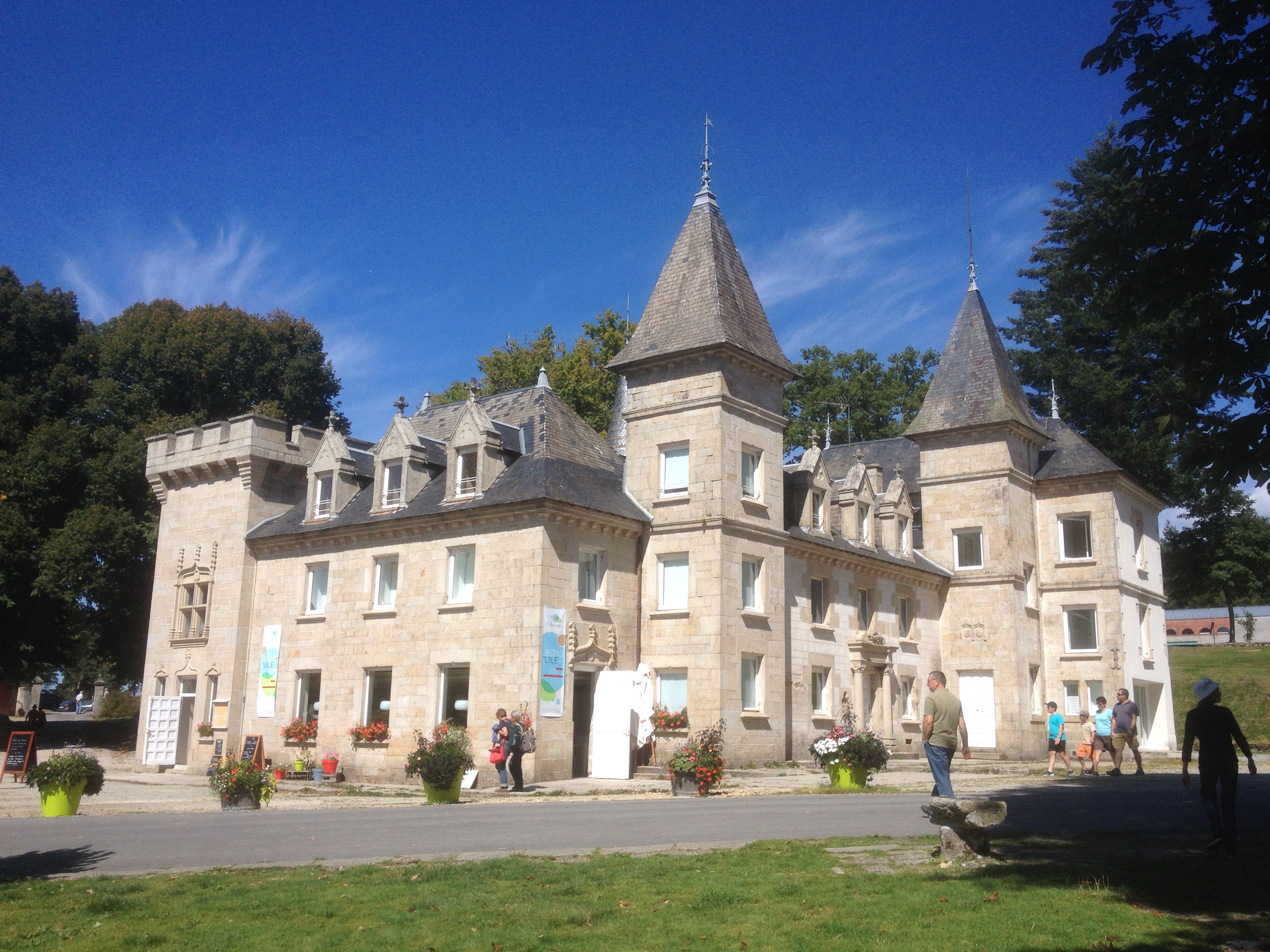
- Beaumont-du-Lac Castle on the Isle of Vassivière

- Coat of arms
- Location of Beaumont-du-Lac
- Location within France Location within Nouvelle-Aquitaine
- Coordinates: 45°46′20″N 1°50′08″E
- Country: France
- Region: Nouvelle-Aquitaine
- Department: Haute-Vienne
- Arrondissement: Limoges
- Canton: Eymoutiers
- Intercommunality: Portes de Vassivière

Government
  - Mayor (2023–2026): Serge Rougier
- Area^{1}: 23.91 km^{2} (9.23 sq mi)
- Highest elevation: 799 m (2,621 ft)
- Lowest elevation: 496 m (1,627 ft)
- Population (2023): 133
  - Density: 5.56/km^{2} (14.4/sq mi)
- Time zone: UTC+01:00 (CET)
  - Summer (DST): UTC+02:00 (CEST)
- INSEE/Postal code: 87009 /87120
- ^{1} French Land Register data, which excludes lakes, ponds, glaciers > 1 km^{2} (0.386 sq mi or 247 acres) and river estuaries.

Beaumont-du-Lac (French pronunciation: [bomɔ̃ dy lak], literally Beaumont of the Lake; Occitan: Beumont, before 1962: Beaumont) is a commune in the Haute-Vienne department in the Nouvelle-Aquitaine region in western France.

== See also ==
- Communes of the Haute-Vienne department
