= Saint-Germain-les-Belles station =

Railway station in Saint-Germain-les-Belles, France

Coordinates: 45°36′34″N 1°28′47″E

Saint-Germain-les-Belles is a railway station in Saint-Germain-les-Belles, Nouvelle-Aquitaine, France. The station is located on the Orléans–Montauban railway line. The station is served by TER (local) services operated by SNCF.

== Train services ==
The following services currently call at Saint-Germain-les-Belles:

- local service (TER Nouvelle-Aquitaine) Limoges - Uzerche - Brive-la-Gaillarde

Preceding station	TER Nouvelle-Aquitaine	Following station
Magnac-Vicq towards Limoges	22	La Porcherie towards Brive-la-Gaillarde
