= Masléon =

- Commune
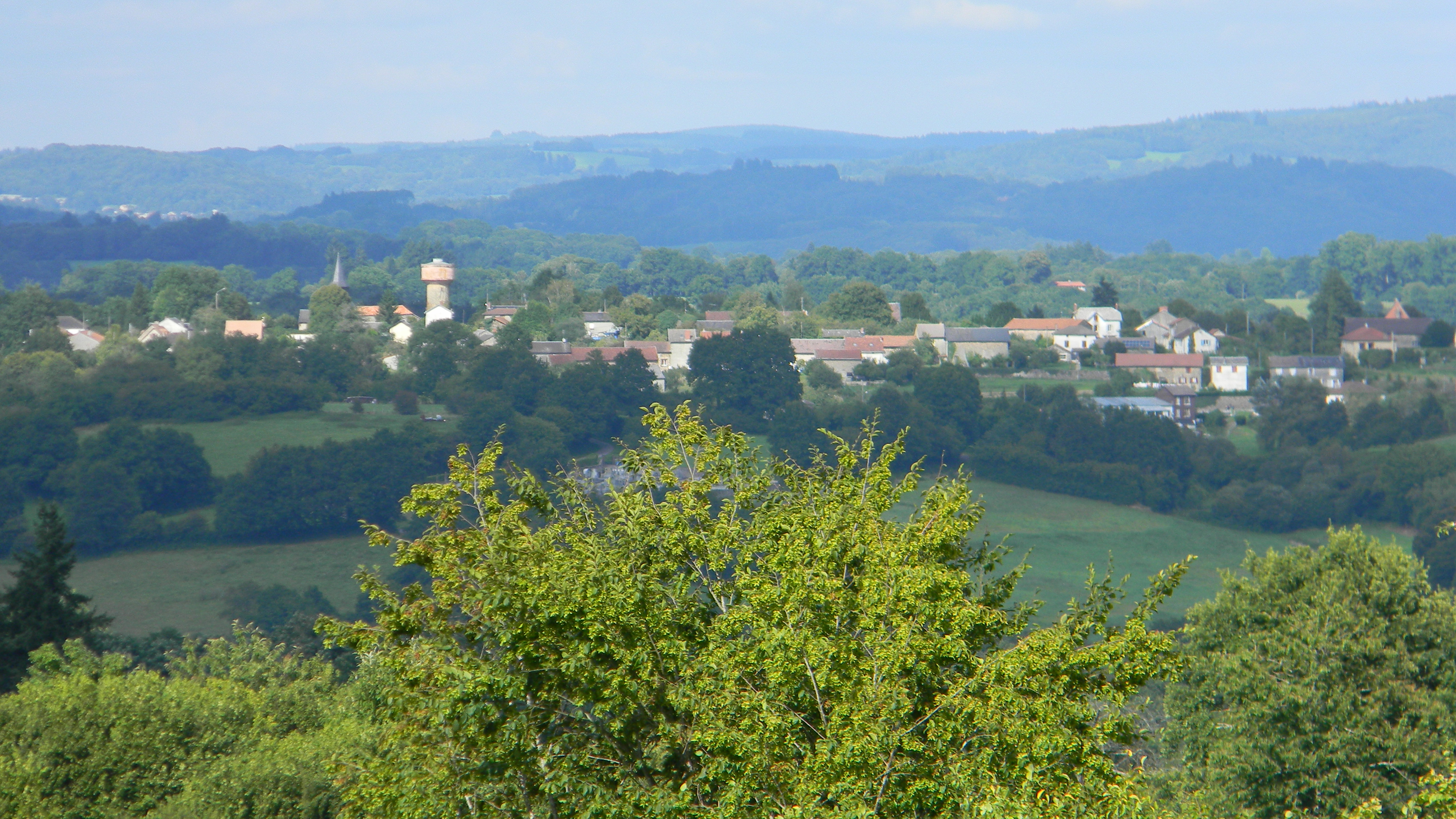
- A general view of the village of Masléon
- Location of Masléon
- Location within France Location within Nouvelle-Aquitaine
- Coordinates: 45°45′53″N 1°34′09″E
- Country: France
- Region: Nouvelle-Aquitaine
- Department: Haute-Vienne
- Arrondissement: Limoges
- Canton: Eymoutiers
- Intercommunality: Briance-Combade

Government
  - Mayor (2020–2026): Yves Le Gouffe
- Area^{1}: 8.72 km^{2} (3.37 sq mi)
- Highest elevation: 418 m (1,371 ft)
- Lowest elevation: 290 m (950 ft)
- Population (2023): 291
  - Density: 33.4/km^{2} (86.4/sq mi)
- Time zone: UTC+01:00 (CET)
  - Summer (DST): UTC+02:00 (CEST)
- INSEE/Postal code: 87093 /87130
- ^{1} French Land Register data, which excludes lakes, ponds, glaciers > 1 km^{2} (0.386 sq mi or 247 acres) and river estuaries.

Masléon (Occitan: Mas Leu) is a commune in the Haute-Vienne department in the Nouvelle-Aquitaine region in west-central France.

== See also ==
- Communes of the Haute-Vienne department
