= Saint-Priest-Ligoure =

- Commune
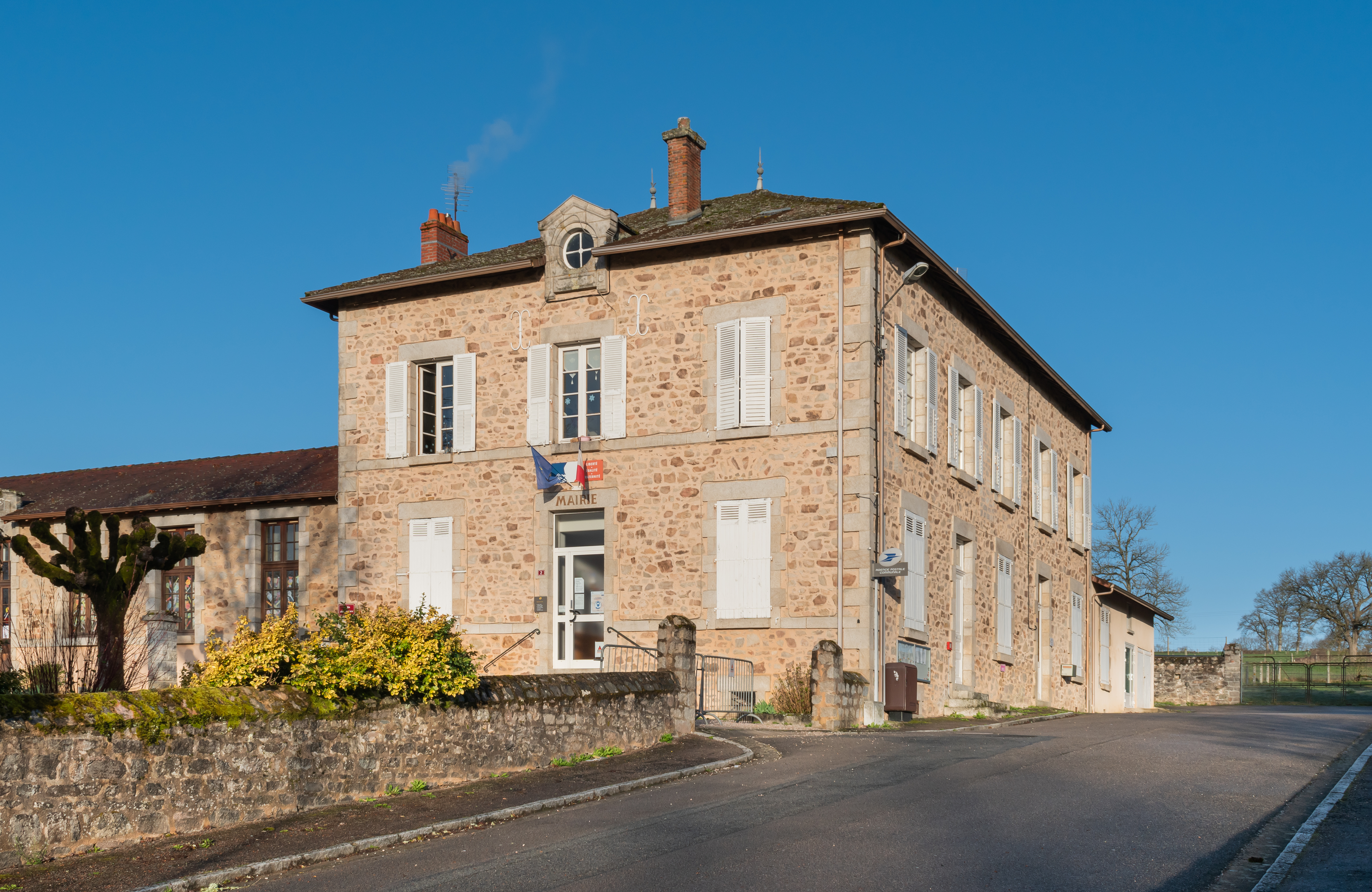
- Town hall of Saint-Priest-Ligoure
- Location of Saint-Priest-Ligoure
- Location within France Location within Nouvelle-Aquitaine
- Coordinates: 45°39′08″N 1°17′33″E
- Country: France
- Region: Nouvelle-Aquitaine
- Department: Haute-Vienne
- Arrondissement: Limoges
- Canton: Eymoutiers

Government
  - Mayor (2020–2026): Bernard Deloménie
- Area^{1}: 41.13 km^{2} (15.88 sq mi)
- Highest elevation: 472 m (1,549 ft)
- Lowest elevation: 269 m (883 ft)
- Population (2023): 692
  - Density: 16.8/km^{2} (43.6/sq mi)
- Time zone: UTC+01:00 (CET)
  - Summer (DST): UTC+02:00 (CEST)
- INSEE/Postal code: 87176 /87800
- ^{1} French Land Register data, which excludes lakes, ponds, glaciers > 1 km^{2} (0.386 sq mi or 247 acres) and river estuaries.

Saint-Priest-Ligoure (French pronunciation: [sɛ̃ pʁijɛ(st) liɡuʁ]; Occitan: Sent Prèch de Ligora) is a commune in the Haute-Vienne department in the Nouvelle-Aquitaine region in west-central France.

== See also ==
- Communes of the Haute-Vienne department
