= Roziers-Saint-Georges =

- Commune
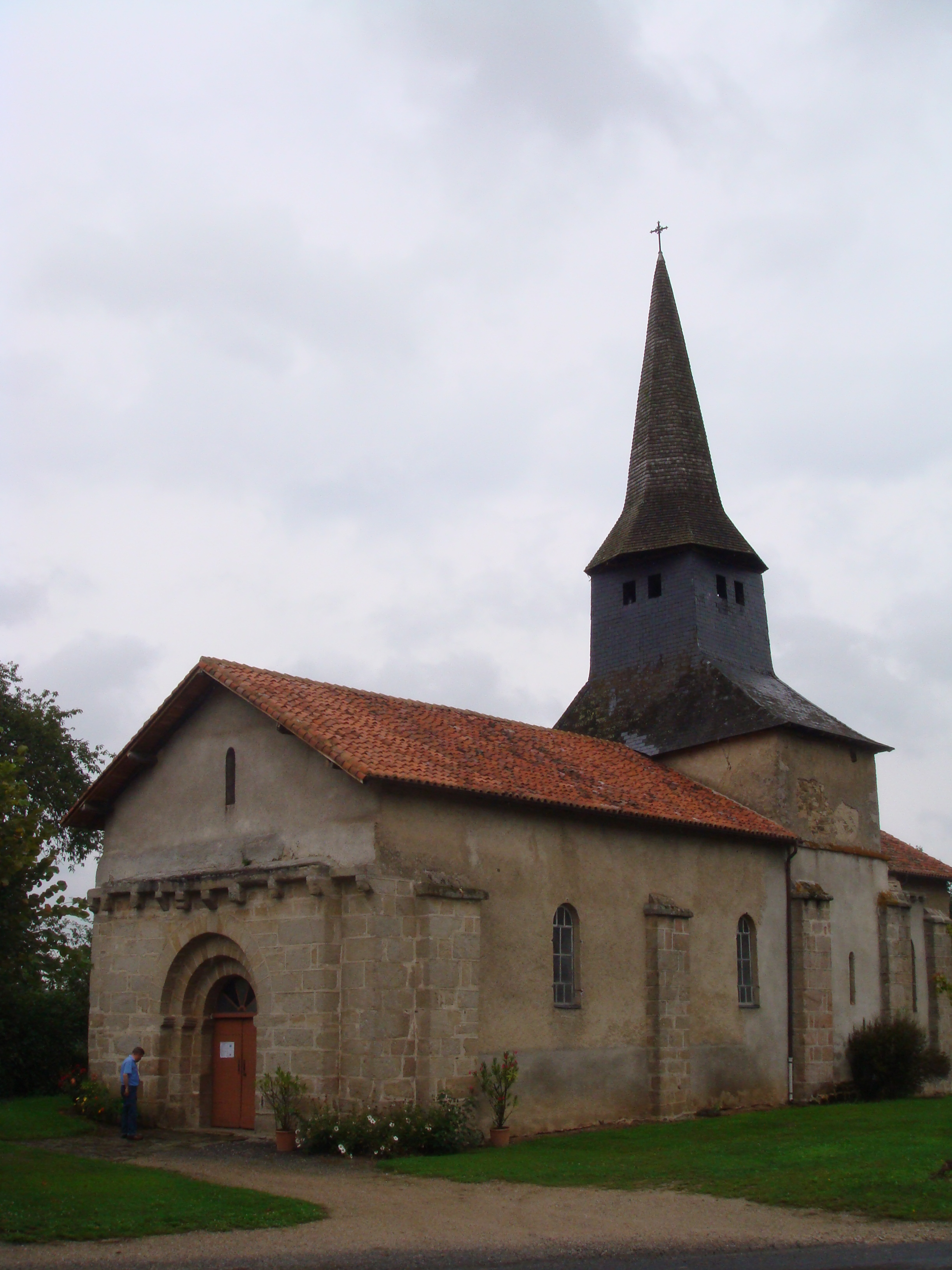
- The church in Roziers-Saint-Georges
- Location of Roziers-Saint-Georges
- Location within France Location within Nouvelle-Aquitaine
- Coordinates: 45°45′05″N 1°32′54″E
- Country: France
- Region: Nouvelle-Aquitaine
- Department: Haute-Vienne
- Arrondissement: Limoges
- Canton: Eymoutiers
- Intercommunality: Briance Combade

Government
  - Mayor (2020–2026): Joe Wampach
- Area^{1}: 11.66 km^{2} (4.50 sq mi)
- Highest elevation: 454 m (1,490 ft)
- Lowest elevation: 295 m (968 ft)
- Population (2023): 158
  - Density: 13.6/km^{2} (35.1/sq mi)
- Time zone: UTC+01:00 (CET)
  - Summer (DST): UTC+02:00 (CEST)
- INSEE/Postal code: 87130 /87130
- ^{1} French Land Register data, which excludes lakes, ponds, glaciers > 1 km^{2} (0.386 sq mi or 247 acres) and river estuaries.

Roziers-Saint-Georges (French pronunciation: [ʁozje sɛ̃ ʒɔʁʒ]; Occitan: Rosiers) is a commune in the Haute-Vienne department in the Nouvelle-Aquitaine region in west-central France.

== See also ==
- Communes of the Haute-Vienne department
