= Jean Blanzat =

French novelist (1906-1977)

Jean Blanzat (French pronunciation: [ʒɑ̃ blɑ̃za]; 6 January 1906, Domps, Haute-Vienne – 6 November 1977, age 71) was a French novelist and a member of the French Resistance.

== Biography ==
After a literary debut noticed in the magazine Europe in 1929 in which he published his first story in 1930, Enfance, Jean Blanzat published his first novel, À moi-même ennemi at éditions Grasset.

As a member of the Resistance within the Groupe du musée de l'Homme, Jean Blanzat was one of the first members of the Comité national des écrivains, alongside Jean Paulhan. During the Occupation, he continued his novelistic activity and received in June 1942 the Grand prix du roman de l'Académie française for L'Orage du matin thanks to the active and committed support of Georges Duhamel, newly elected perpetual secretary, and his friend François Mauriac who by this choice challenged the power in place.

At the Liberation of France, Jean Blanzat became editor-in-chief of Éditions Grasset (1945–1953). He was then a member of the Reading Committee at Éditions Gallimard and wrote a literary column at Le Figaro (1946–1960). In 1964, he obtained the Prix Femina for his novel Le Faussaire.

== Works ==
- 1930: Enfance,
- 1936: Septembre, éditions Grasset
- À moi-même ennemi, éditions Grasset
- 1942: L'Orage du matin
- 1957: La Gartempe, éditions Gallimard
- 1964: Le Faussaire
- 1966: L'Iguane

== Bibliography ==
- Laurent Bourdelas, Du Pays et de l'exil Un abécédaire de la littérature du Limousin, Les Ardents Editeurs, 2008.
- Christine Lagarde-Escoffier, Le romancier Jean Blanzat: de l'héritage à l'hérésie.
- Collectif: Pour saluer Jean Blanzat, Presses Univ. Limoges, 2007.
