= Rempnat =

- Commune
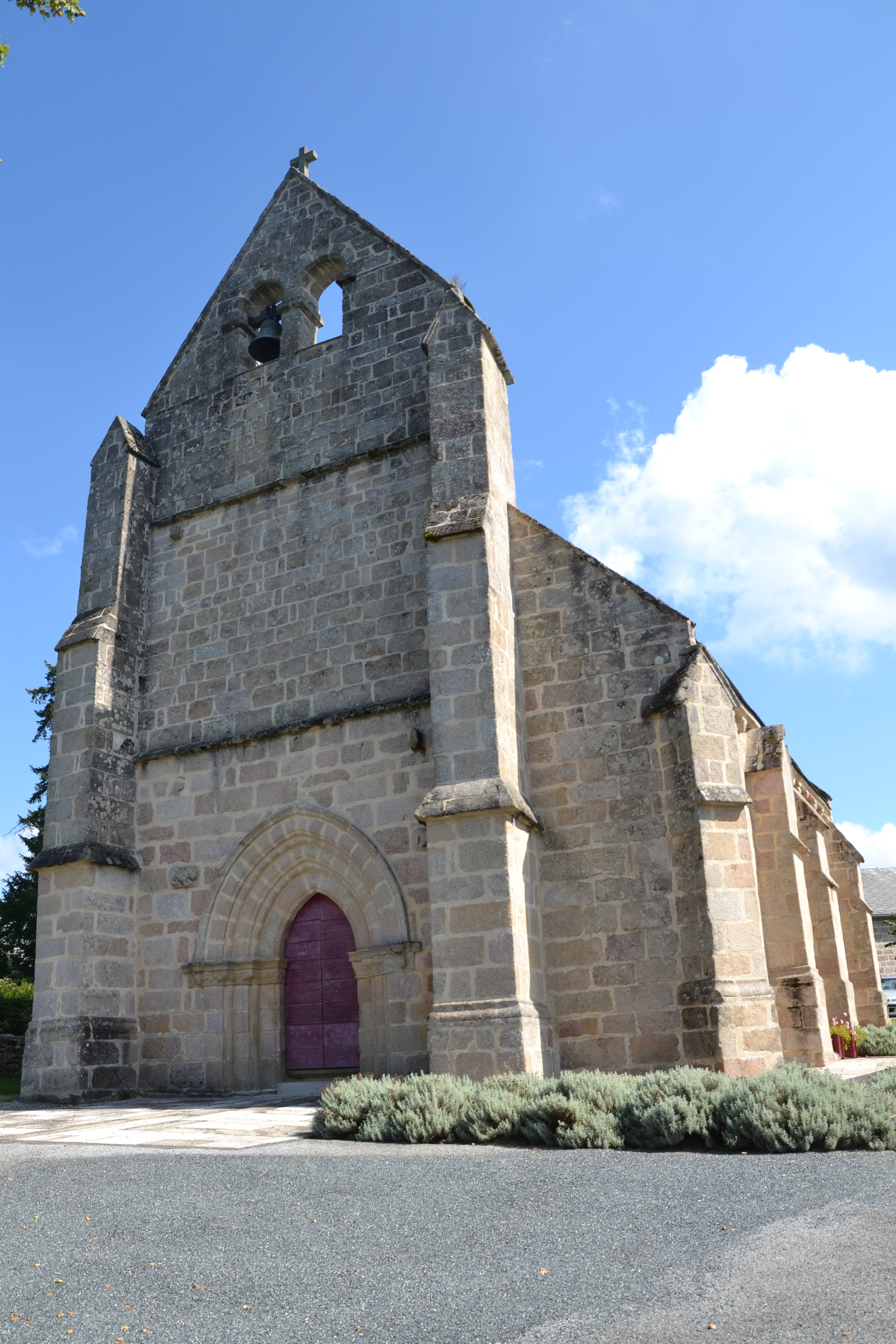
- The church in Rempnat
- Location of Rempnat
- Location within France Location within Nouvelle-Aquitaine
- Coordinates: 45°41′16″N 1°53′25″E
- Country: France
- Region: Nouvelle-Aquitaine
- Department: Haute-Vienne
- Arrondissement: Limoges
- Canton: Eymoutiers
- Intercommunality: Portes de Vassivière

Government
  - Mayor (2020–2026): Michèle Salagnat
- Area^{1}: 20.91 km^{2} (8.07 sq mi)
- Highest elevation: 777 m (2,549 ft)
- Lowest elevation: 502 m (1,647 ft)
- Population (2023): 141
  - Density: 6.74/km^{2} (17.5/sq mi)
- Time zone: UTC+01:00 (CET)
  - Summer (DST): UTC+02:00 (CEST)
- INSEE/Postal code: 87123 /87120
- ^{1} French Land Register data, which excludes lakes, ponds, glaciers > 1 km^{2} (0.386 sq mi or 247 acres) and river estuaries.

Rempnat (Occitan: Remnac) is a commune in the Haute-Vienne department in the Nouvelle-Aquitaine region in west-central France.

== See also ==
- Communes of the Haute-Vienne department
