= Saint-Germain-les-Belles =

- Commune
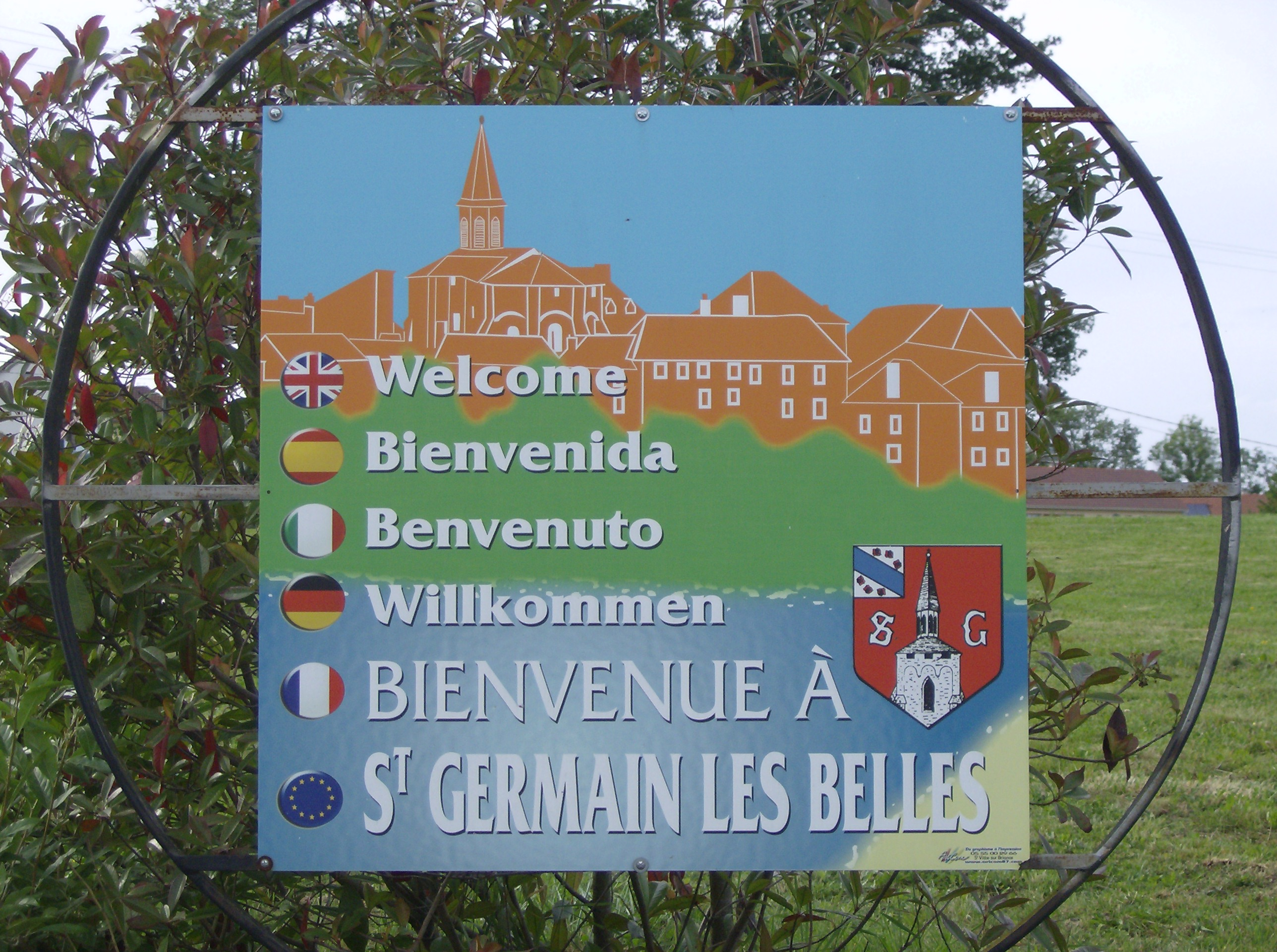
- A welcome sign in Saint-Germain-les-Belles

- Coat of arms
- Location of Saint-Germain-les-Belles
- Location within France Location within Nouvelle-Aquitaine
- Coordinates: 45°36′56″N 1°29′44″E
- Country: France
- Region: Nouvelle-Aquitaine
- Department: Haute-Vienne
- Arrondissement: Limoges
- Canton: Eymoutiers

Government
  - Mayor (2020–2026): Marc Ditlecadet
- Area^{1}: 37.28 km^{2} (14.39 sq mi)
- Highest elevation: 489 m (1,604 ft)
- Lowest elevation: 315 m (1,033 ft)
- Population (2023): 1,150
  - Density: 30.8/km^{2} (79.9/sq mi)
- Time zone: UTC+01:00 (CET)
  - Summer (DST): UTC+02:00 (CEST)
- INSEE/Postal code: 87146 /87380
- ^{1} French Land Register data, which excludes lakes, ponds, glaciers > 1 km^{2} (0.386 sq mi or 247 acres) and river estuaries.

Saint-Germain-les-Belles (French pronunciation: [sɛ̃ ʒɛʁmɛ̃ le bɛl]; Occitan: Sent German las Belas) is a commune in the Haute-Vienne department in the Nouvelle-Aquitaine region in west-central France. Saint-Germain-les-Belles station has rail connections to Brive-la-Gaillarde and Limoges.

Inhabitants are known as Saint-Germinois in French.

== See also ==
- Communes of the Haute-Vienne department
