= Château-Chervix =

Château-Chervix Chasteu Chervic (Occitan)
- Commune
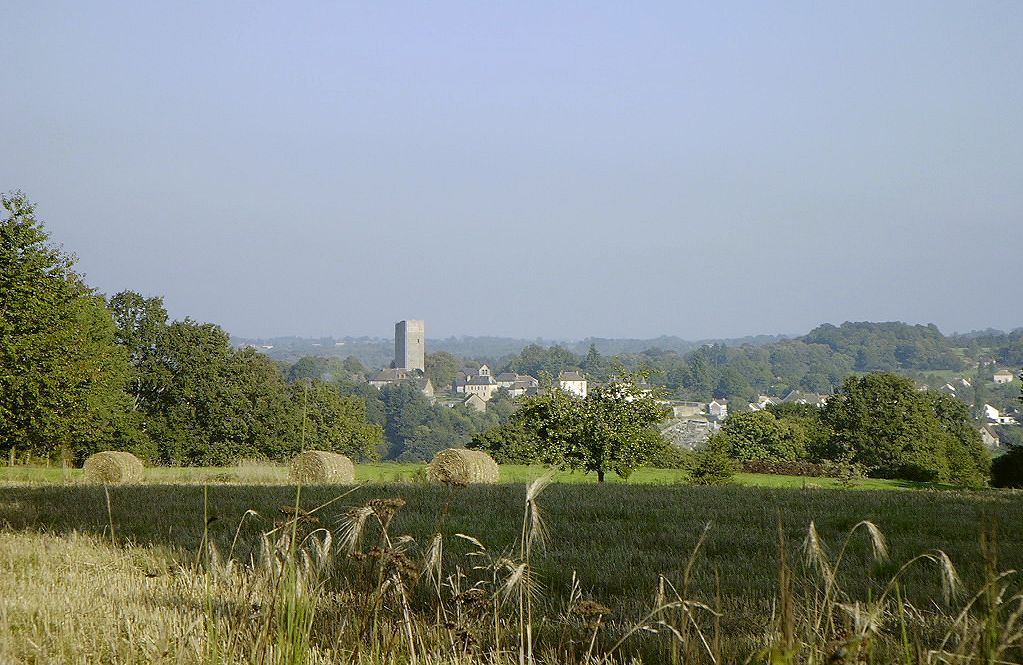
- A general view of the village of Château-Chervix

- Coat of arms
- Location of Château-Chervix
- Location within France Location within Nouvelle-Aquitaine
- Coordinates: 45°36′31″N 1°21′17″E
- Country: France
- Region: Nouvelle-Aquitaine
- Department: Haute-Vienne
- Arrondissement: Limoges
- Canton: Eymoutiers

Government
  - Mayor (2020–2026): Jean-Luc Lachaud
- Area^{1}: 51.05 km^{2} (19.71 sq mi)
- Highest elevation: 534 m (1,752 ft)
- Lowest elevation: 313 m (1,027 ft)
- Population (2023): 781
  - Density: 15.3/km^{2} (39.6/sq mi)
- Time zone: UTC+01:00 (CET)
  - Summer (DST): UTC+02:00 (CEST)
- INSEE/Postal code: 87039 /87380
- ^{1} French Land Register data, which excludes lakes, ponds, glaciers > 1 km^{2} (0.386 sq mi or 247 acres) and river estuaries.

Château-Chervix (French: [ʃɑto ʃɛʁvi]; Occitan: Chasteu Chervic) is a commune in the Haute-Vienne department in the Nouvelle-Aquitaine region in western France.

It has 800 inhabitants (2019). Inhabitants are known as Châtelauds in French.

== See also ==
- Communes of the Haute-Vienne department
