= Neuvic-Entier =

- Commune
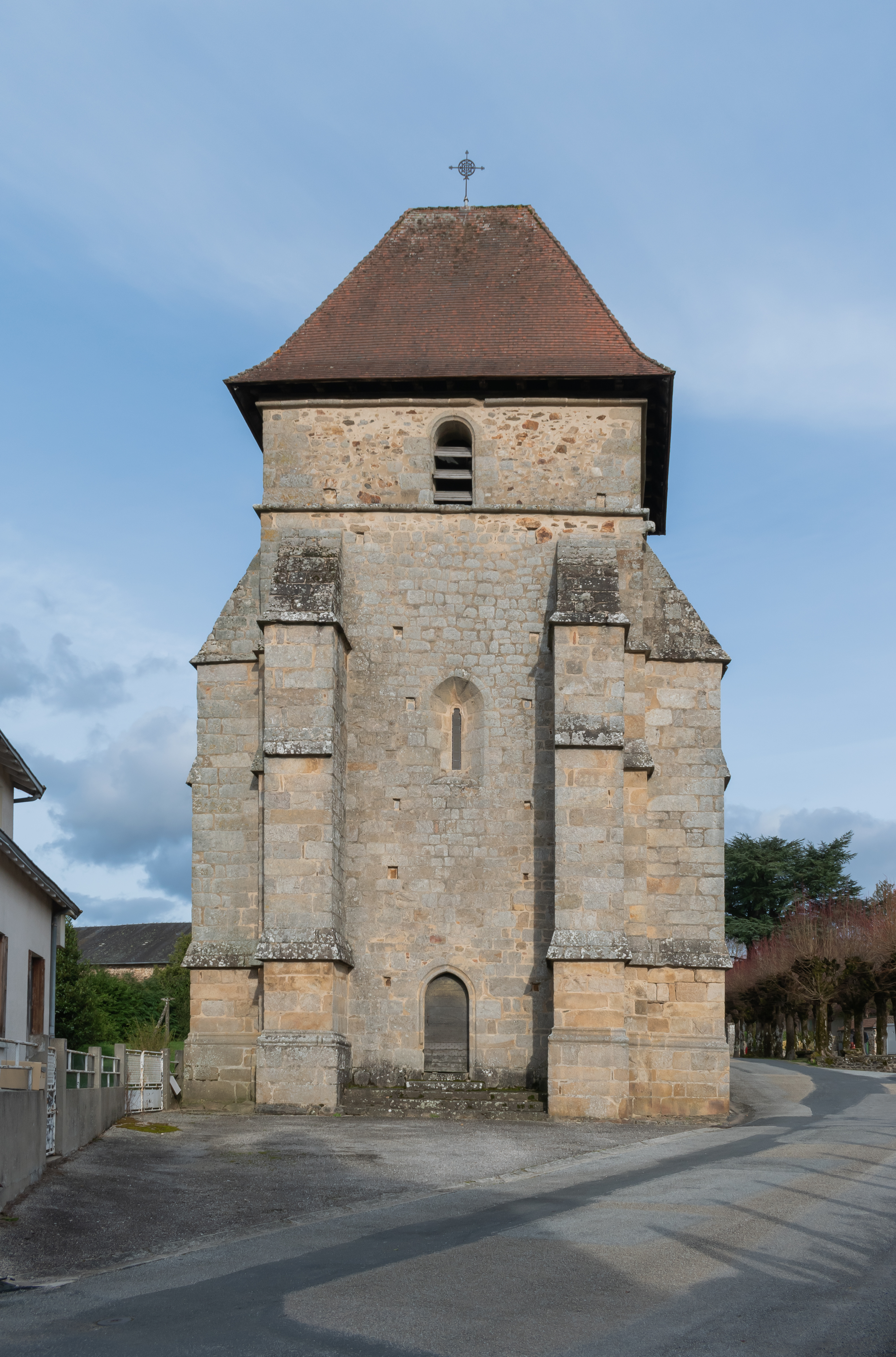
- Neuvic-Entier Church

- Coat of arms
- Location of Neuvic-Entier
- Location within France Location within Nouvelle-Aquitaine
- Coordinates: 45°43′21″N 1°36′44″E
- Country: France
- Region: Nouvelle-Aquitaine
- Department: Haute-Vienne
- Arrondissement: Limoges
- Canton: Eymoutiers
- Intercommunality: Briance Combade

Government
  - Mayor (2020–2026): Joël Forestier
- Area^{1}: 39.34 km^{2} (15.19 sq mi)
- Highest elevation: 600 m (2,000 ft)
- Lowest elevation: 290 m (950 ft)
- Population (2023): 865
  - Density: 22.0/km^{2} (56.9/sq mi)
- Time zone: UTC+01:00 (CET)
  - Summer (DST): UTC+02:00 (CEST)
- INSEE/Postal code: 87105 /87130
- ^{1} French Land Register data, which excludes lakes, ponds, glaciers > 1 km^{2} (0.386 sq mi or 247 acres) and river estuaries.

Neuvic-Entier (French pronunciation: [nøvik ɑ̃tje]; Occitan: Nòu Vic) is a commune in the Haute-Vienne department in the Nouvelle-Aquitaine region in west-central France.

Inhabitants are known as Neuvicois.

== See also ==
- Communes of the Haute-Vienne department
