= Canton of Eymoutiers =

Coordinates: 45.74°N 1.74°E

The canton of Eymoutiers is an administrative division of the Haute-Vienne department, western France. Its borders were modified at the French canton reorganisation which came into effect in March 2015. Its seat is in Eymoutiers.

It consists of the following communes:

1. Augne
2. Beaumont-du-Lac
3. Bujaleuf
4. Château-Chervix
5. Châteauneuf-la-Forêt
6. Cheissoux
7. Coussac-Bonneval
8. La Croisille-sur-Briance
9. Domps
10. Eymoutiers
11. Glanges
12. Linards
13. Magnac-Bourg
14. Masléon
15. Meuzac
16. Nedde
17. Neuvic-Entier
18. Peyrat-le-Château
19. La Porcherie
20. Rempnat
21. Roziers-Saint-Georges
22. Saint-Amand-le-Petit
23. Sainte-Anne-Saint-Priest
24. Saint-Germain-les-Belles
25. Saint-Gilles-les-Forêts
26. Saint-Julien-le-Petit
27. Saint-Méard
28. Saint-Priest-Ligoure
29. Saint-Vitte-sur-Briance
30. Surdoux
31. Sussac
32. Vicq-sur-Breuilh
