= Vicq-sur-Breuilh =

- Commune
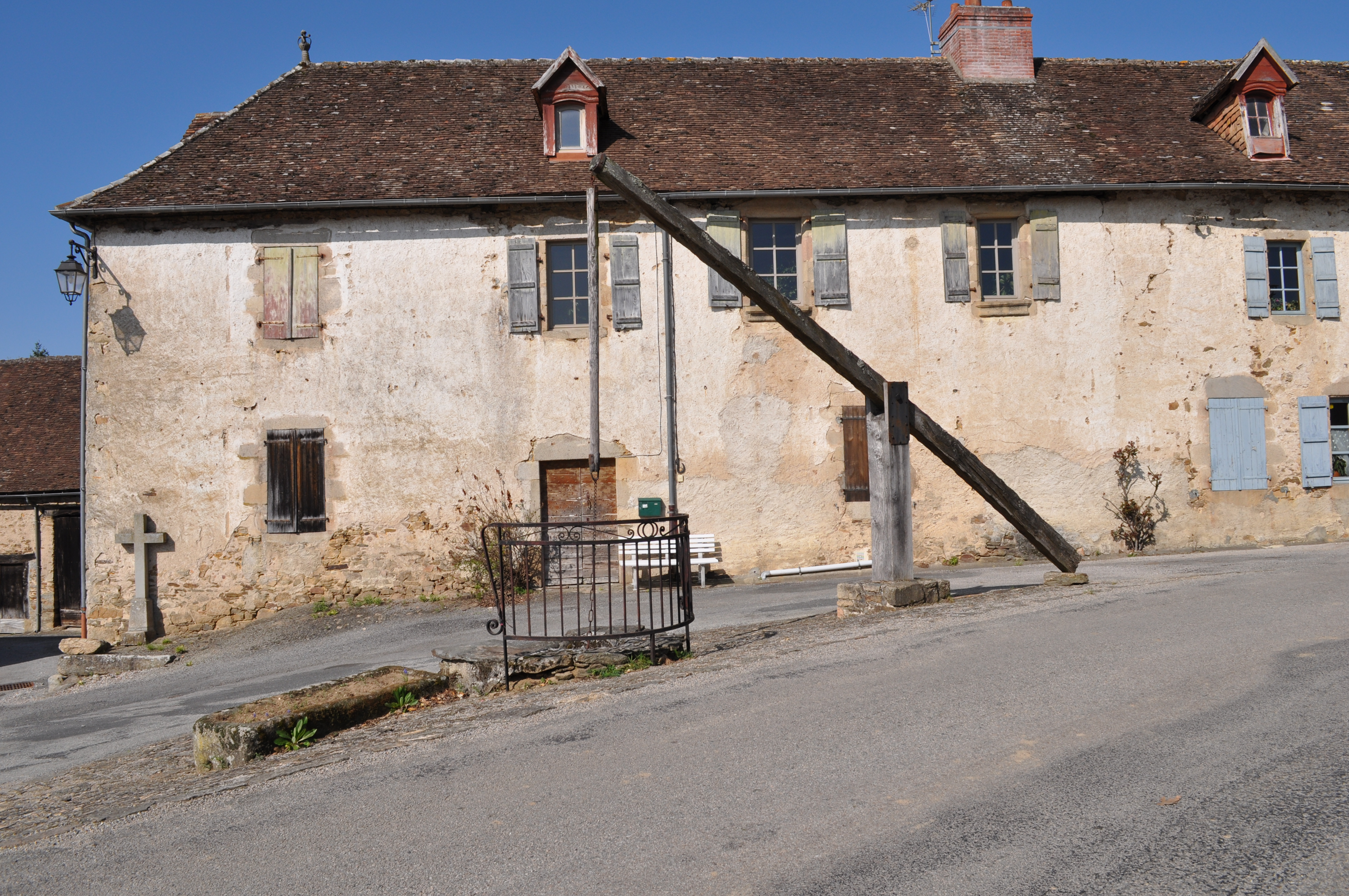
- The balance well in Vicq-sur-Breuilh

- Coat of arms
- Location of Vicq-sur-Breuilh
- Location within France Location within Nouvelle-Aquitaine
- Coordinates: 45°38′49″N 1°22′56″E
- Country: France
- Region: Nouvelle-Aquitaine
- Department: Haute-Vienne
- Arrondissement: Limoges
- Canton: Eymoutiers

Government
  - Mayor (2020–2026): Christine de Neuville
- Area^{1}: 50.89 km^{2} (19.65 sq mi)
- Highest elevation: 437 m (1,434 ft)
- Lowest elevation: 272 m (892 ft)
- Population (2023): 1,313
  - Density: 25.80/km^{2} (66.82/sq mi)
- Time zone: UTC+01:00 (CET)
  - Summer (DST): UTC+02:00 (CEST)
- INSEE/Postal code: 87203 /87260
- ^{1} French Land Register data, which excludes lakes, ponds, glaciers > 1 km^{2} (0.386 sq mi or 247 acres) and river estuaries.

Vicq-sur-Breuilh (French pronunciation: [vik syʁ bʁœj]; Occitan: Vic) is a commune in the Haute-Vienne department in the Nouvelle-Aquitaine region in west-central France.

== Geography ==
The village lies in the middle of the commune, on the right bank of the ruisseau de Vicq, which flows into the Breuilh, a tributary of the Briance, which forms all of the commune's north-western border.

== Demographics ==
Inhabitants are known as Vicquois.

== See also ==
- Communes of the Haute-Vienne department
