= Saint-Julien-le-Petit =

- Commune
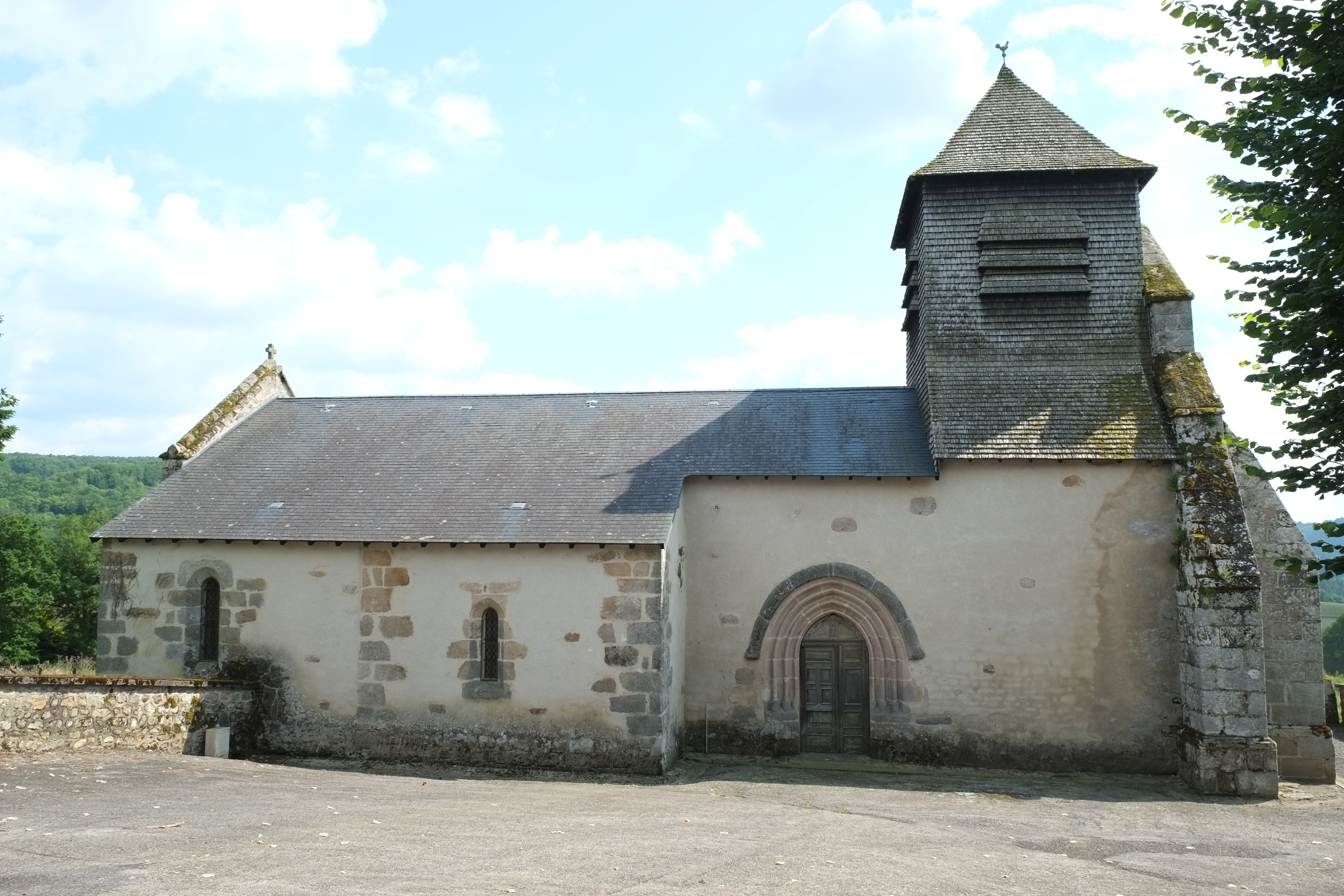
- The church of Saint Julien de Brioude, in Saint-Julien-le-Petit
- Location of Saint-Julien-le-Petit
- Location within France Location within Nouvelle-Aquitaine
- Coordinates: 45°49′28″N 1°42′24″E
- Country: France
- Region: Nouvelle-Aquitaine
- Department: Haute-Vienne
- Arrondissement: Limoges
- Canton: Eymoutiers
- Intercommunality: Portes de Vassivière

Government
  - Mayor (2020–2026): Michel Chadelaud
- Area^{1}: 29.13 km^{2} (11.25 sq mi)
- Highest elevation: 626 m (2,054 ft)
- Lowest elevation: 339 m (1,112 ft)
- Population (2023): 290
  - Density: 10/km^{2} (26/sq mi)
- Time zone: UTC+01:00 (CET)
  - Summer (DST): UTC+02:00 (CEST)
- INSEE/Postal code: 87153 /87460
- ^{1} French Land Register data, which excludes lakes, ponds, glaciers > 1 km^{2} (0.386 sq mi or 247 acres) and river estuaries.

Saint-Julien-le-Petit (French pronunciation: [sɛ̃ ʒyljɛ̃ lə pəti]; Limousin: Sent Julian lo Pitit) is a commune in the Haute-Vienne department in the Nouvelle-Aquitaine region in west-central France.

== See also ==
- Communes of the Haute-Vienne department
