= Solignac Abbey =

Founded around 631 AD, dissolved French Revolution

Saint Peter and Paul Abbey, Solignac
- Abbaye Saint-Pierre-Saint-Paul de Solignac
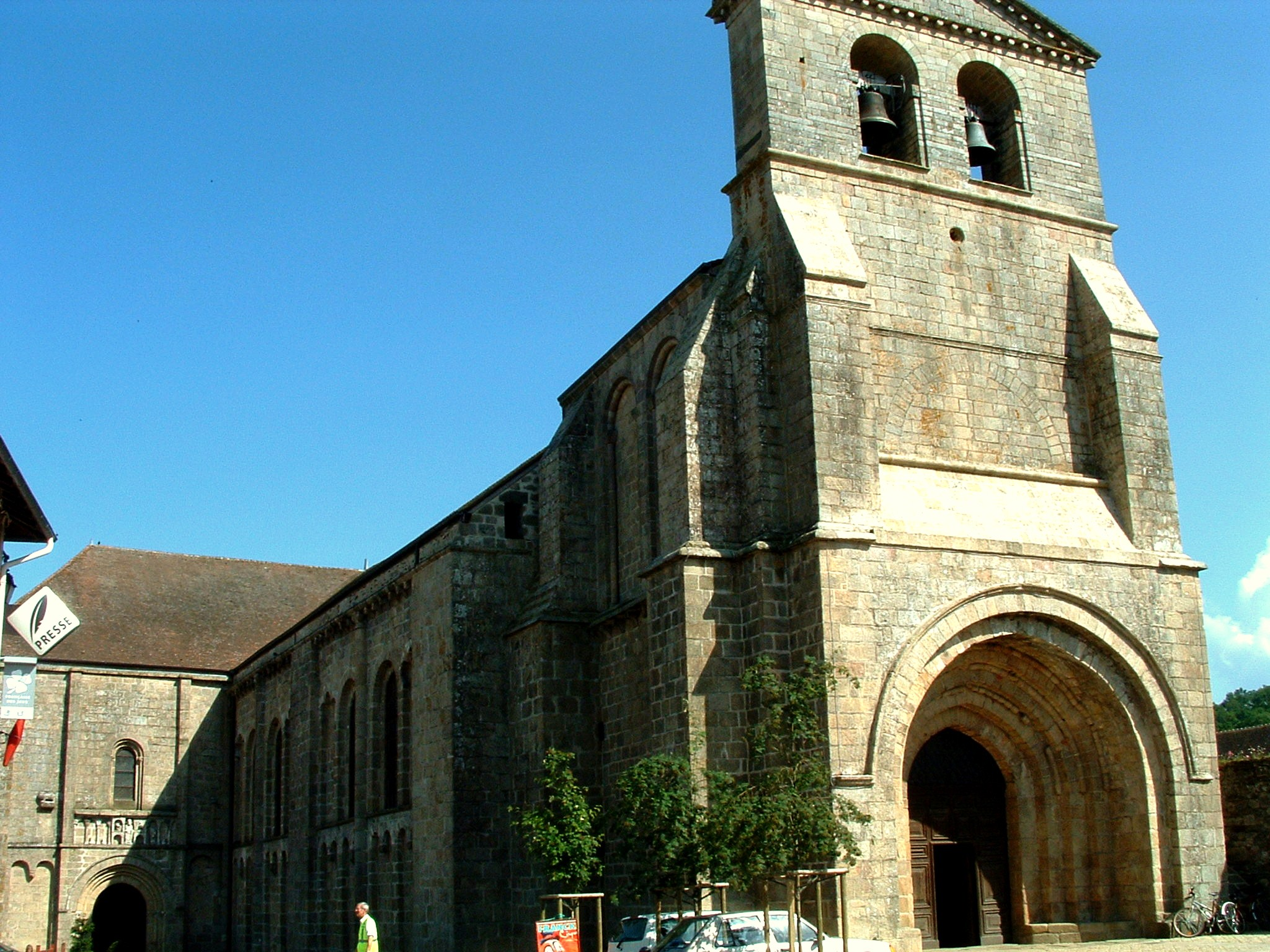
- Saint-Pierre-Saint-Paul abbey church, since the Revolution the parish church of Saint-Michel

- Location within France

Monastery information
- Order: Benedictine
- Denomination: Catholic Church

Architecture
- Functional status: Former abbey
- Heritage designation: Classé Monument historique 1862; Inscrit Monument historique 1944 Doorway
- Style: Romanesque
- Groundbreaking: 7th century
- Completed date: 13th century

Site
- Location: Solignac, Haute-Vienne, Nouvelle-Aquitaine
- Country: France
- Coordinates: 45.75460°N 1.27582°E

Solignac Abbey, or the Abbey of Saint Peter and Saint Paul of Solignac, is an abbey in Solignac, near Limoges, in Haute-Vienne. It was founded around 631 AD by Saint Eligius (Éloi). The present buildings date to the 12th century, but have been modified many times since then. The abbey was dissolved during the French Revolution and the buildings were put to new uses, including a prison, boarding school, porcelain factory and seminary. As of 2021 there were plans to restore it back to its original function as a monastery.

== History of the abbey ==
=== Foundation ===
Solignac Abbey was founded by Saint Eligius of Noyon who asked King Dagobert I for the village of Solemniacum, (the land of Solignac) to found a monastery. The abbey was founded in 631 or 632, on 22 November in the tenth year of Dagobert's reign. The foundation is made in honour of the apostles Peter and Paul, the martyrs Pancrace and Denys and their companions, the saints and confessors Martin, Médard, Rémi and Germain. The act of foundation is counter-signed by the bishops Adeodatus of Mâcon, Madegilosus of Tours, Chanoaldus of Laon, Maurin of Beauvais, Salapius of Nantes, Hildegarius of Sens and Loup of Limoges.

The abbey was not under the jurisdiction of the bishop, but was subordinated to the king. The act gave the monks ownership of the abbey as long as they followed the rules of Saints Benedict and Columbanus.

According to legend, Saint Eligius mounted on a rock on the "heights" of Solignac (this rock is named after the rock Saint Éloi). He threw a hammer from this rock, and founded the abbey where it fell.

=== Changes in status ===
Eligius admired Luxeuil Abbey in Haute-Saône, founded by Saint Colombanus. He sent for monks from there, including the first abbot, Saint Remacle. The original rule was that of Luxeuil, and was inspired by the prescriptions of Saint Columban and Saint Benedict. A few years later Saint Remacle was appointed Bishop of Maastricht.

Saint Audoin (Ouen) wrote that the abbey quickly gained importance. The abbey soon had one hundred and fifty monks. Saint Audoin, a friend of Saint Eligius, in his Life of Eligius, describes a “fertile and pleasant” place, “copious and well-watered orchards”, “the proximity of a beautiful river”. He says of the monastery: "I saw there such a beautiful observance of the holy Rule that the life of its monks is almost unique in its kind when compared to that of the other monasteries of Gaul". He goes on to say "there are many skilled workers in different arts and crafts, and all of them are brought up to the highest perfection by the fear of Christ and the practice of prompt obedience." The abbey of Solignac was then a large silversmith's workshop.

=== After Eligius ===
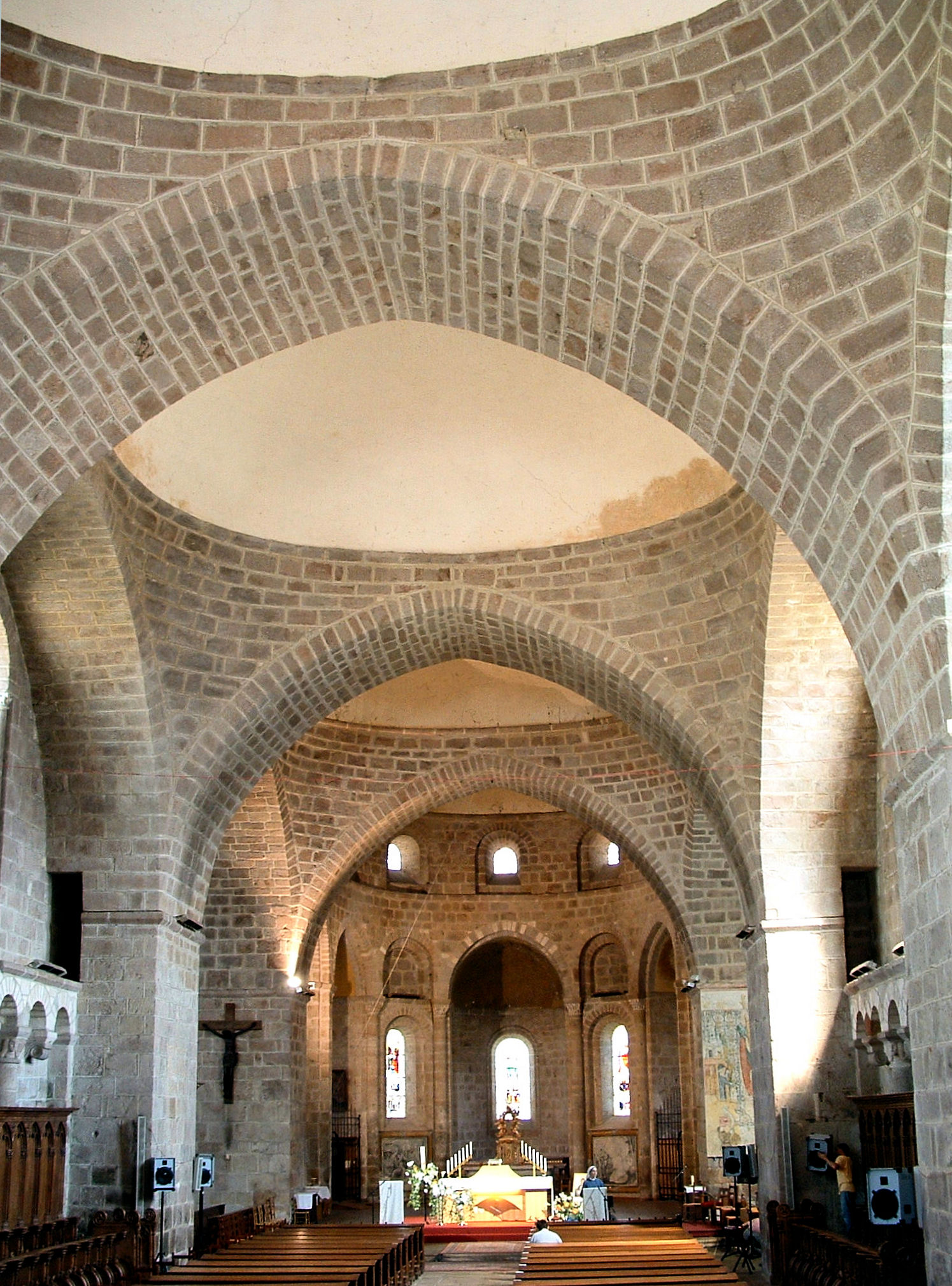
Nave below row of cupolas

When Remacle left the abbey to become bishop of Maastricht, he brought with him Saint Hadelin, a native of Aquitaine, where he was abbot of Celles and then of Visé. A young Saxon slave, bought by Saint Eloi, entered the abbey. Thillo (or Saint Théau) was the successor of Eloi in directing the manufacture of silverware. He later became a hermit in Brageac near Mauriac, then returns to die, in 702, near Solignac on the site of church of Le Vigen.

Between the eighth century and the eleventh century, troubles and periods of recovery followed one another. There were Saracen invasions around 732–735. An incursion in 793 of imprecise origin causing damage that required Pepin the Short, then Charlemagne, to grant privileges. In 817 Louis the Pious granted privileges to rebuild the abbey.

In 820, Father Aigulf imposed the Benedictine rule reformed by Saint Benedict of Aniane.

In 823, Raoul de Bourges probably became a clerk at the abbey of Solignac. This would explain why he later asked for help from the Abbey of Solignac when he founded abbeys such as Végennes and Beaulieu.

Around 855, Cunibert, Abbot of Solignac, successor to Aigulf, provided monks for the foundation of Beaulieu Abbey.

The Viking incursions caused the arrival of the relics of Saint Martial de Limoges in Solignac. Then, around 860 or 864, Solignac Abbey was looted and set on fire. Monks who took refuge in Vic-Fezensac brought back the relics of Saint Fauste.

In 866 the Abbot Bernard was present at the Council of Soissons chaired by King Charles the Bald.

On 12 June 883, Pope Pope Marinus I granted a charter and took Solignac Abbey under his patronage and confirmed the property of the abbey.

On 13 June 889 a charter was given to Micy Abbey by King Odo of France.

Charles the Simple, with the agreement of Turpion, Bishop of Limoges, on 18 July 922 gave sixteen churches in Solignac to help it to recover from the destruction due to the period of anarchy. Nothing is known of the constructions of this period.

In 942 the abbot Géraud II founded a "fraternity of prayer" at Fleury Abbey. There were exchanges between the two abbeys. For example, Bernard II, abbot of Solignac in 983, then of Beaulieu, and finally bishop of Cahors, was a pupil of Abbo of Fleury. His successor, Amblard, recalls in a letter to Hervé, treasurer and builder of the Basilica of Saint-Martin-de-Tours, that he was his fellow student in Fleury.

The Abbey of Saint-Pierre du Vigeois, founded by Saint Yrieix before 572, joined Solignac at the start of the eleventh century. Its community was very large, around a hundred monks.

In 1031 Géraud III took part in the Council of Limoges during which Dieudonné, bishop of Cahors, preached the truce of God.

=== Reconstruction of the abbey, revolts and wars ===
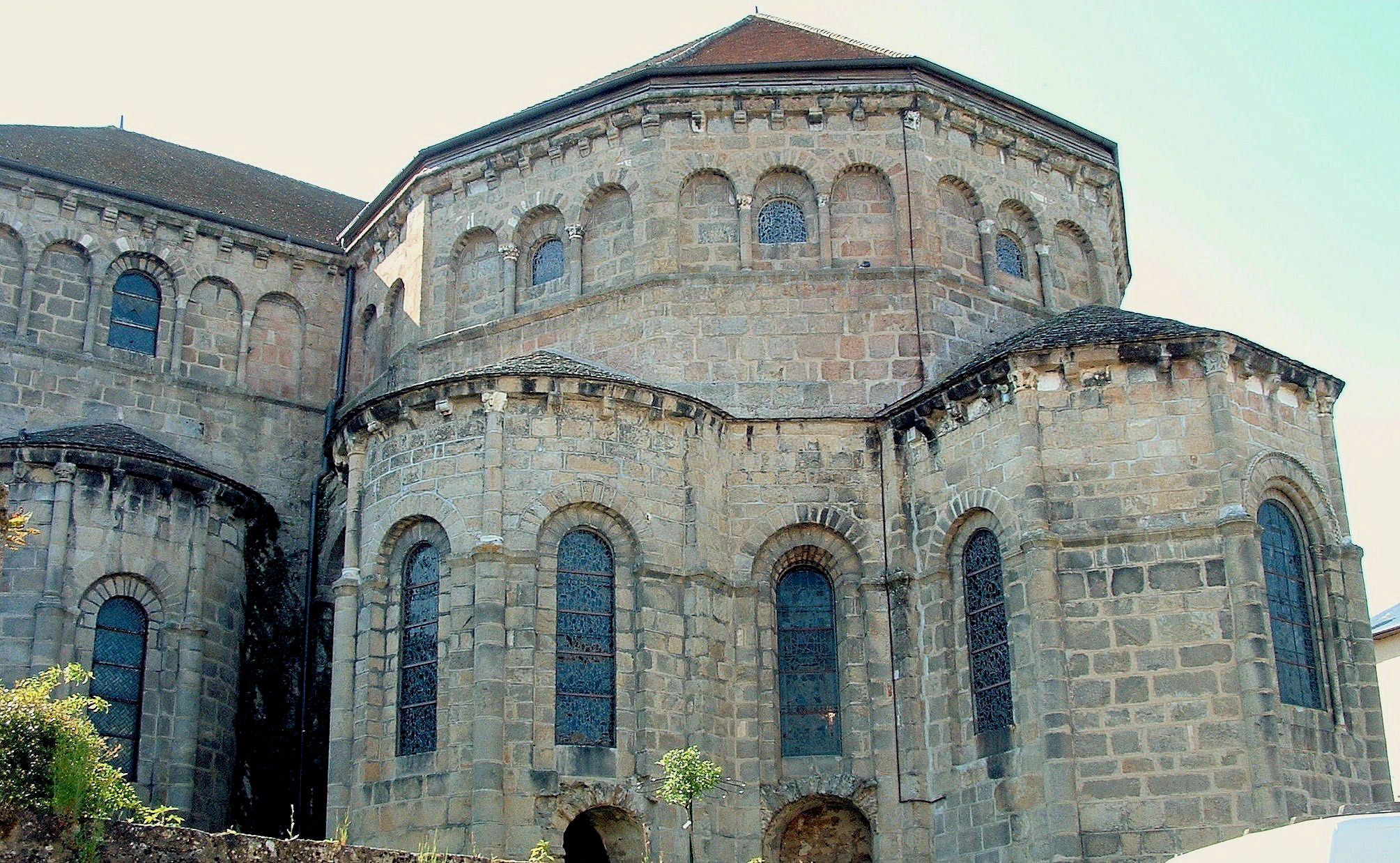
Apse and south arm of the transept

Many donations were made to the abbey in the eleventh and twelfth centuries. They allowed the reconstruction of the abbey. Popes Eugene III, in 1147, and Adrian IV granted bulls confirming the titles and rights of the abbey. Emperor Frederick Barbarossa wrote a letter to the King of England in 1157 recommending the abbey to him.

The first half of the thirteenth century marked an insurrection of the inhabitants because the merchant bourgeoisie no longer wanted to report to the abbot. The porch tower was seized by the inhabitants of the village during the troubles of 1240–1246.

The viscount of Limoges had to intervene in December 1241 to return the abbey to the monks. The monks had disputes with the lords of the Château de Châlucet in the thirteenth century.

In 1388, English bands burned down the church choir. Pope at Avignon Clement VII granted indulgences to allow its restoration.

In March 1422, the English were in Solignac. In 1460, Father Martial Bony de Lavergne had stained glass windows installed and installed stalls. It is probably under his rule that a bell tower which existed on the North crosspiece was demolished.

=== Renaissance ===
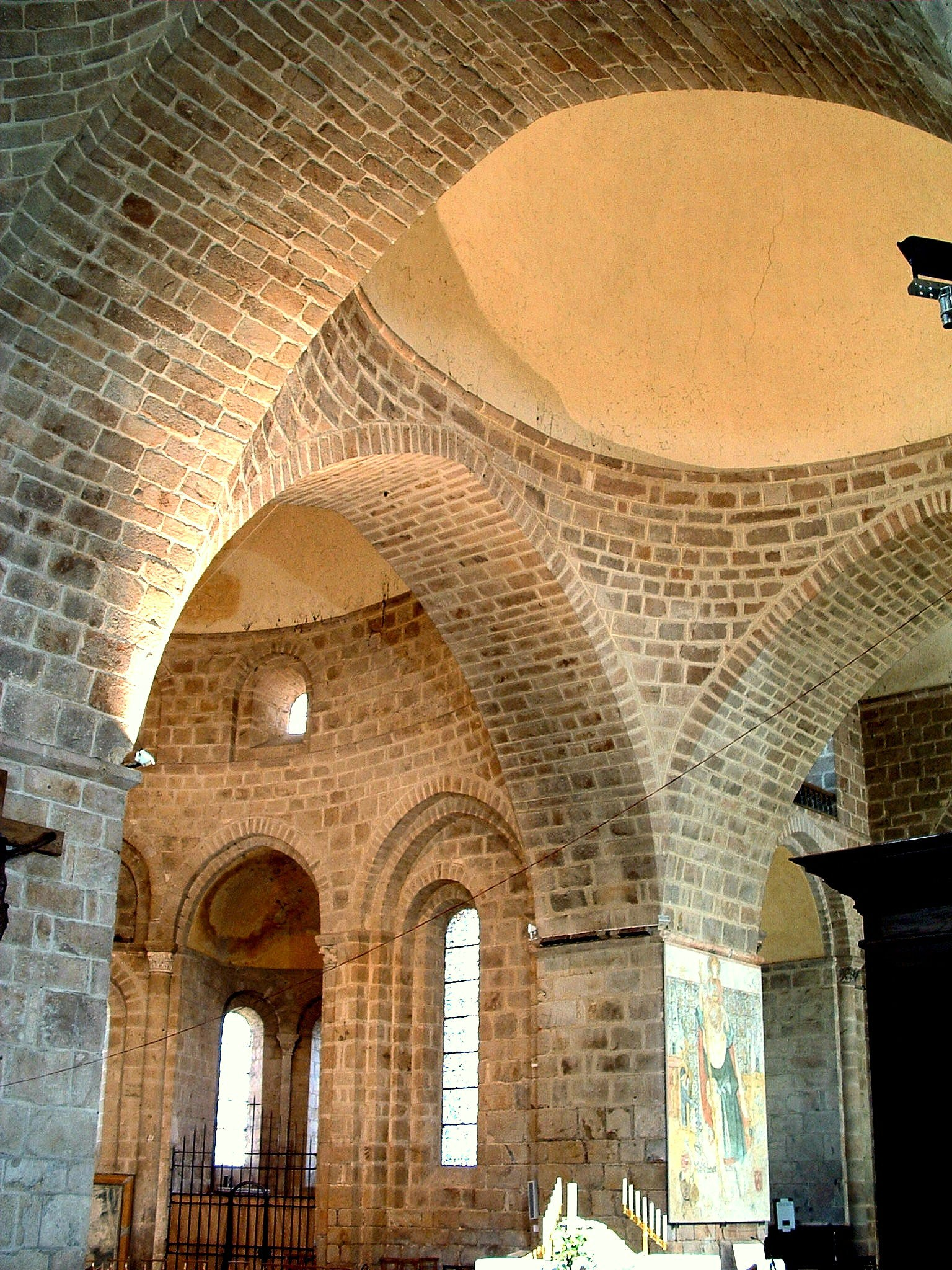
Crossing of the transept

The abbey was commissioned in 1503. The Protestant troops, after their victory at La Roche-l'Abeille, plundered the abbey in 1569. The reliquaries were destroyed and the relics burned, but the archives were preserved. In 1574, André, viscount of Bourdeilles, seneschal of Périgord, after seizing the abbey with the lord of Pierre-Buffière, obtained from the king the donation of the abbey.

Ruined by the French Wars of Religion and the peasant revolts, the abbey rose again during the Catholic Counter-Reformation, when on 26 June 1619, the commendatory abbot Jean Jaubert de Barrault, Bishop of Bazas, following the example of the Augustian abbey in Limoges, appealed to six monks from the Congregation of Saint-Maur who restored the Benedictine rule. They encountered the hostility of the monks in place, so the abbey was shared and the Maurists were satisfied with a small chapel until death swept away their opponents in 1635.

The abbey was then separated by a wall to allow the parish church to be installed in the nave. At the beginning of the 18th century, after a fire which destroyed part of the main building, the western part was rebuilt in the style of the time

=== French Revolution ===
In 1790, the fourteen monks that still remained in the abbey were thrown out by the French Revolution. The abbey then became a parish church, the Saint-Michel church having been auctioned and then exploited as a stone quarry. The abbey buildings were used as a prison, in particular for refractory priests (who were then sent to the Rochefort pontoons), and for nuns.

=== Modern age ===
Under the Second French Empire (1852–1870) the abbey became a boarding school for young girls, then housed a porcelain factory until 1930. From 1939 to 1945, the normaliens of Obernai (Bas-Rhin) found refuge there. The Missionary Oblates of Mary Immaculate took possession of the place in 1946, and the buildings became a seminary, then a place of retreat. "It was in 1945. The Oblates were looking for a place large enough to accommodate the numerous entrants into the congregation. They set their sights on the Abbey of Solignac, which they knew from having preached parish missions in the pre-war sector ... The adventure lasted until the early 1970s ".

The entrance door to the old abbey was listed as a historical monument by decree of 24 January 1944.

The abbey was then occupied by the Communauté du Verbe de Vie, tenant of the oblates of Mary. In 2011, the Diocese of Limoges acquired the abbey from the oblates of Mary.

=== New foundation of the Saint Joseph de Clairval Abbey ===
==== Resumption of the contemplative life ====
Since November 2021, the abbey has once again sheltered a contemplative monastic life, with the installation from August of the Saint-Joseph priory founded by the Benedictine monks of the Saint Joseph de Clairval Abbey in Flavigny-sur-Ozerain (Côte d'Or). "The abbey and its abbacy will thus reconnect with what they were set up for and resume the thread of 1150 years of Benedictine presence".

==== First planned works ====
"With its 10,000 square metres (110,000 sq ft) of developed surface, its 6 hectares (15 acres) of land, its 4,000 square metres (43,000 sq ft) of roofing, its 250 windows or its kilometers of various networks and after 20 years of vacancy the abbey will become a building site. After the work necessary for the installation of the monks, the most urgent work is that of the Saint-Jean porch, which threatened to ruin and was secured in the winter of 2020–2021.

== Gallery ==
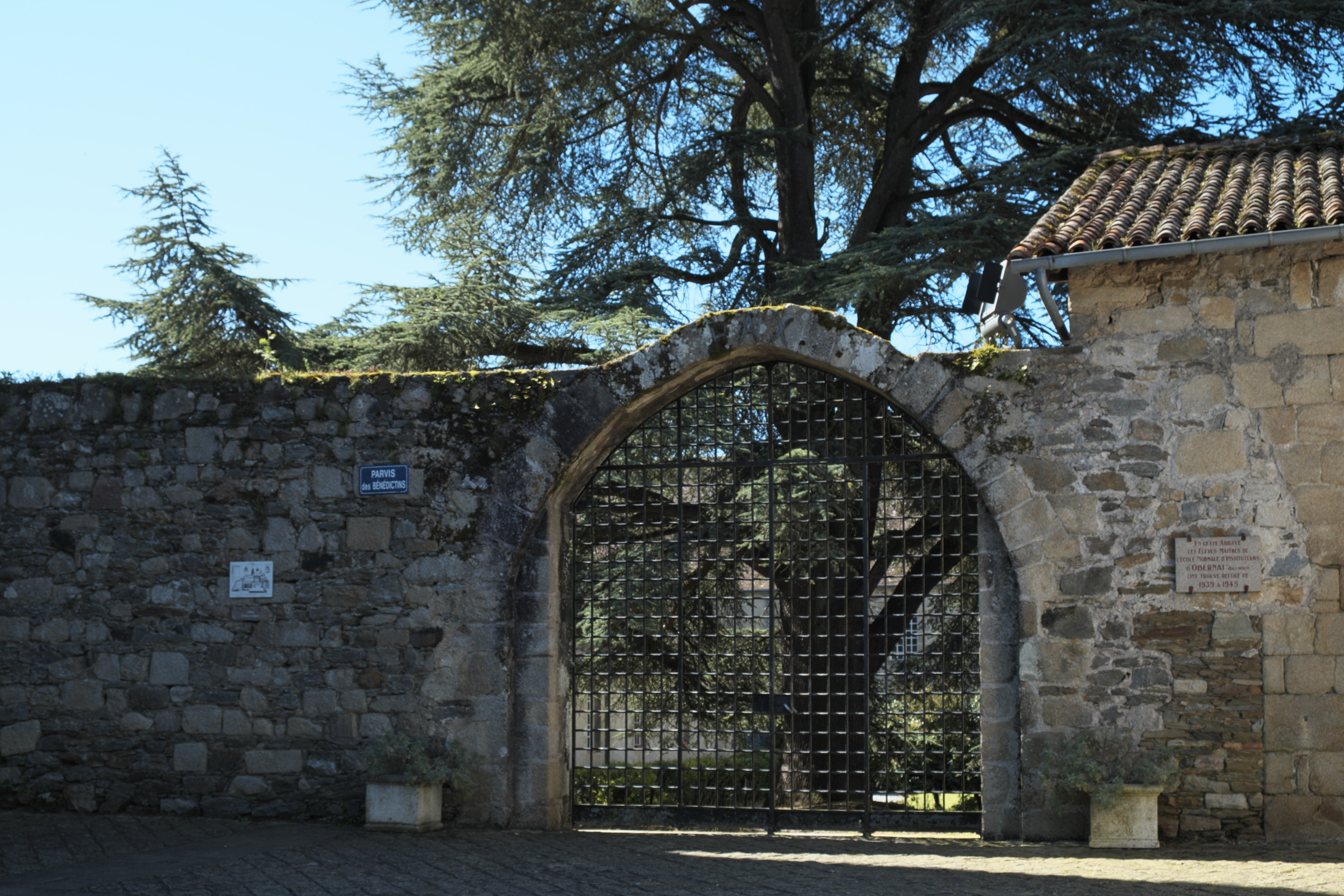
Entrance to the abbey

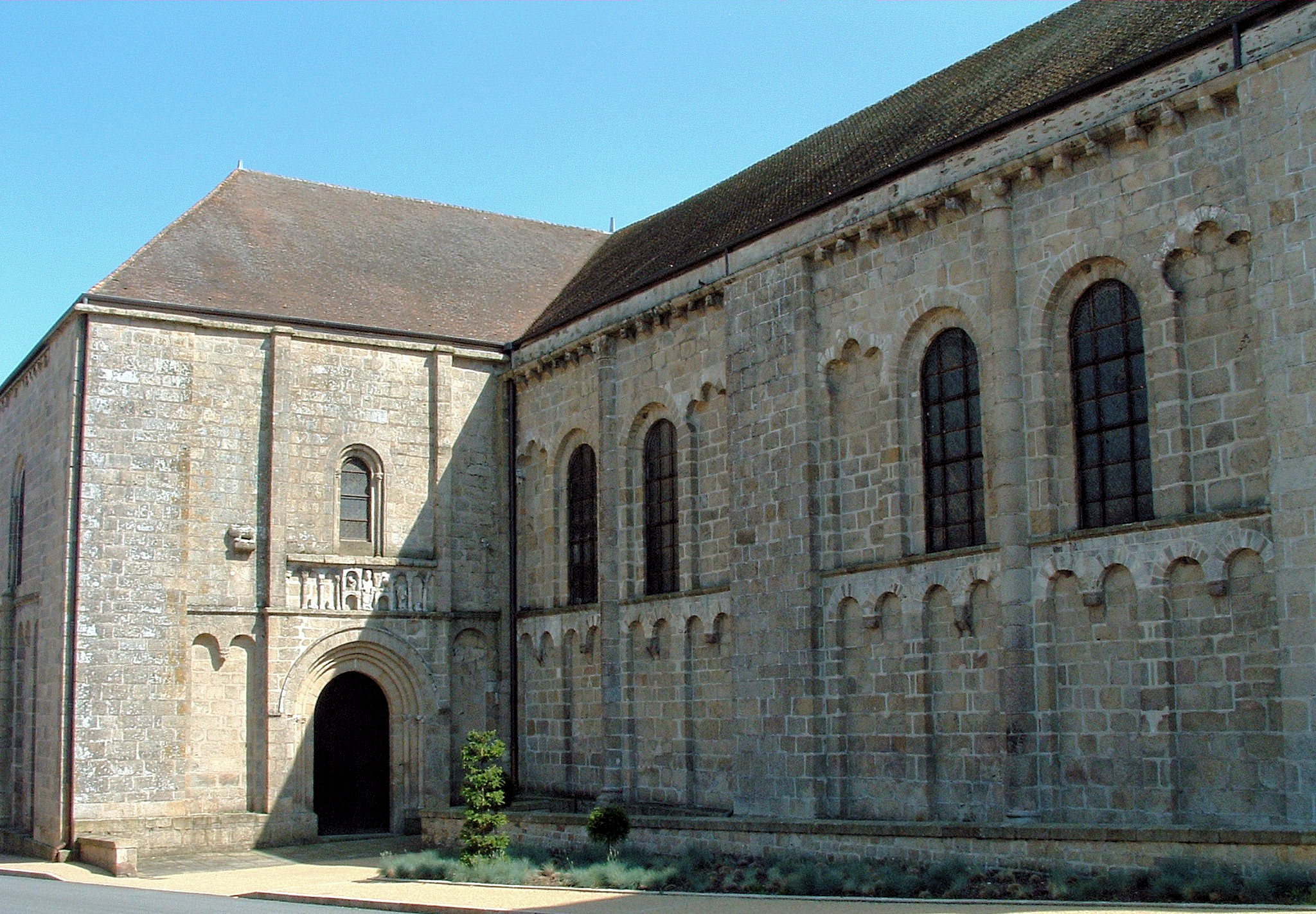
North side facade and entrance in the north arm of the transept

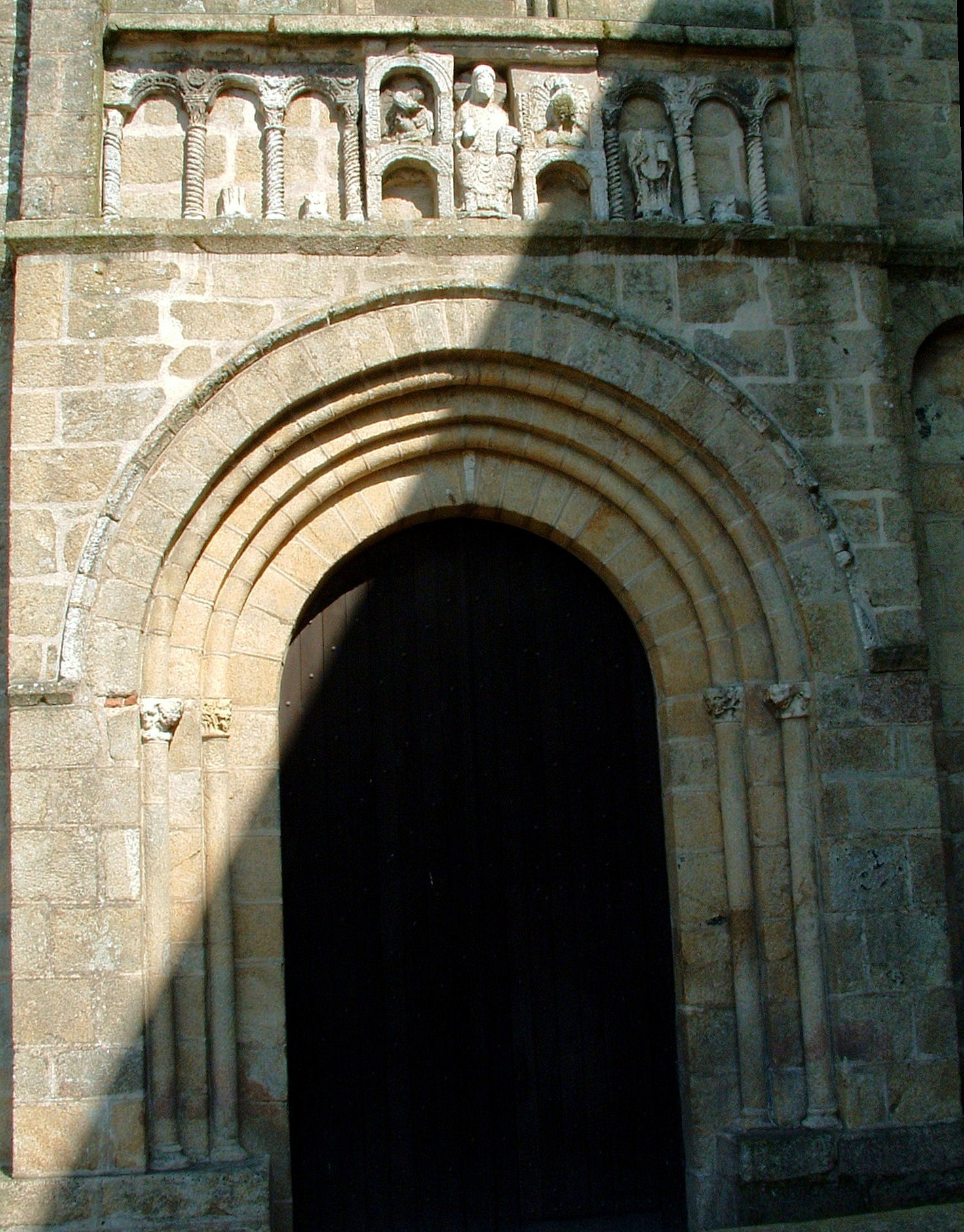
Door of the north arm of the transept

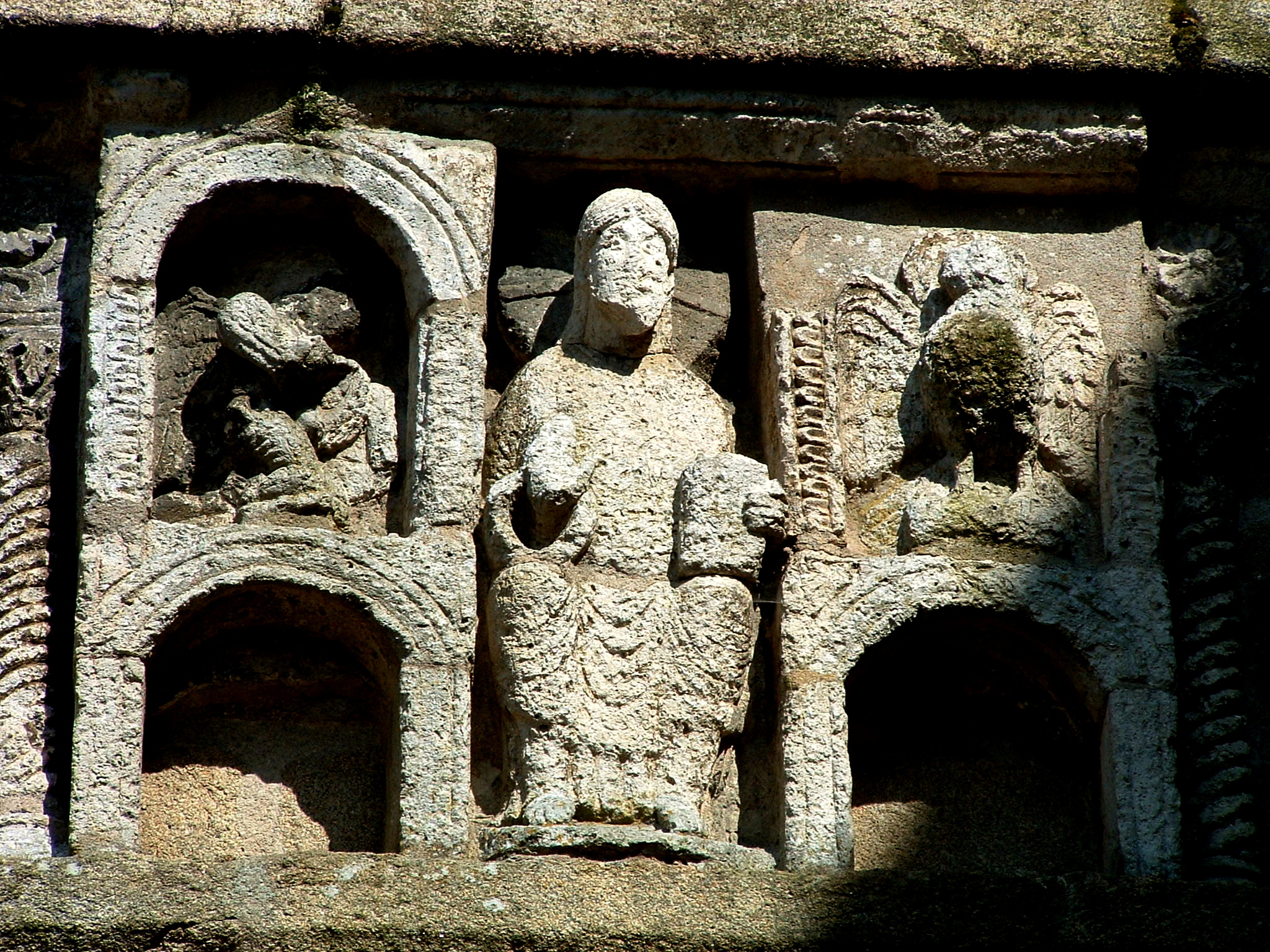
Decoration above the door of the north arm of the transept

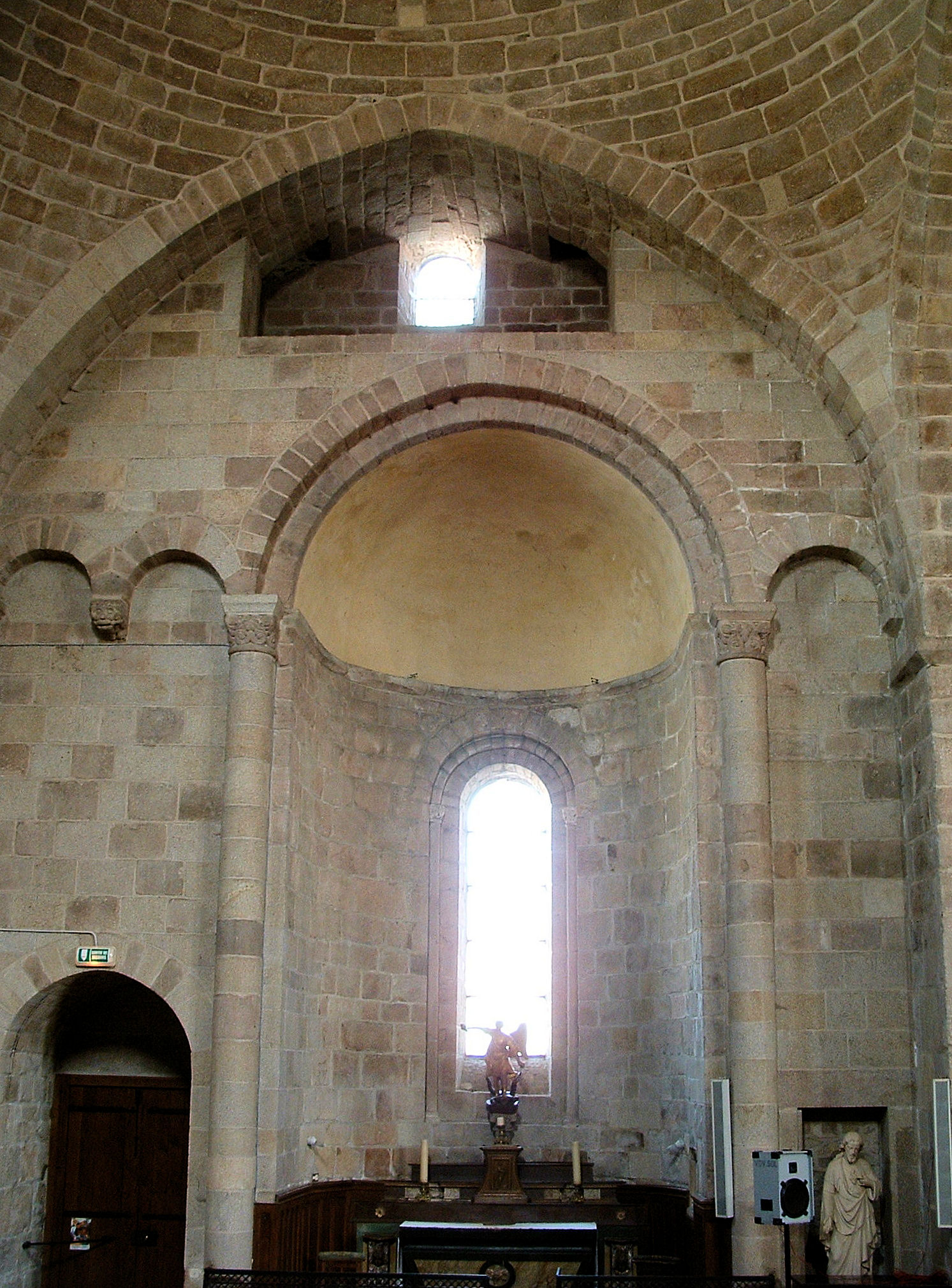
Chapel of the north arm of the transept

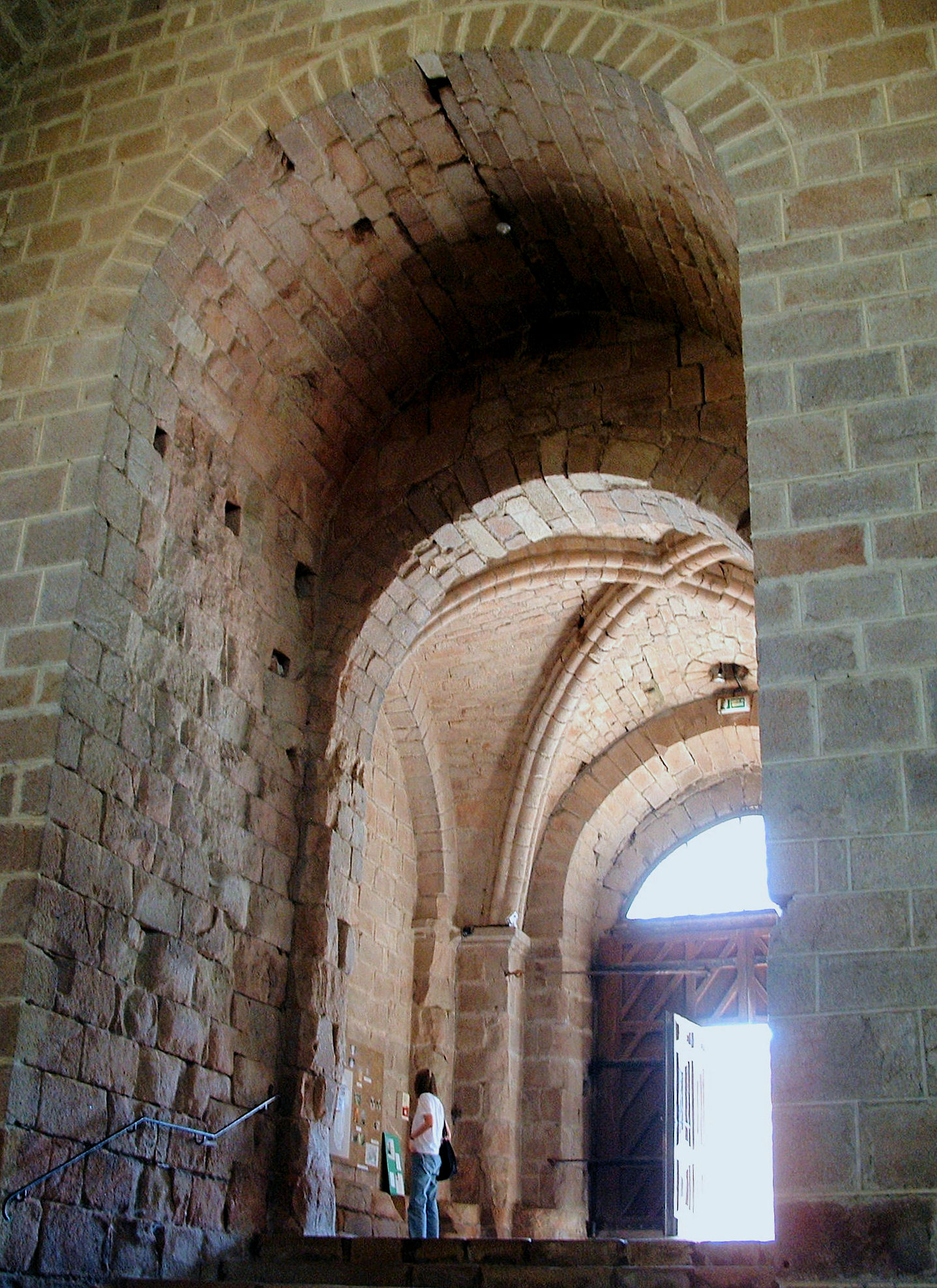
Porch under the west tower

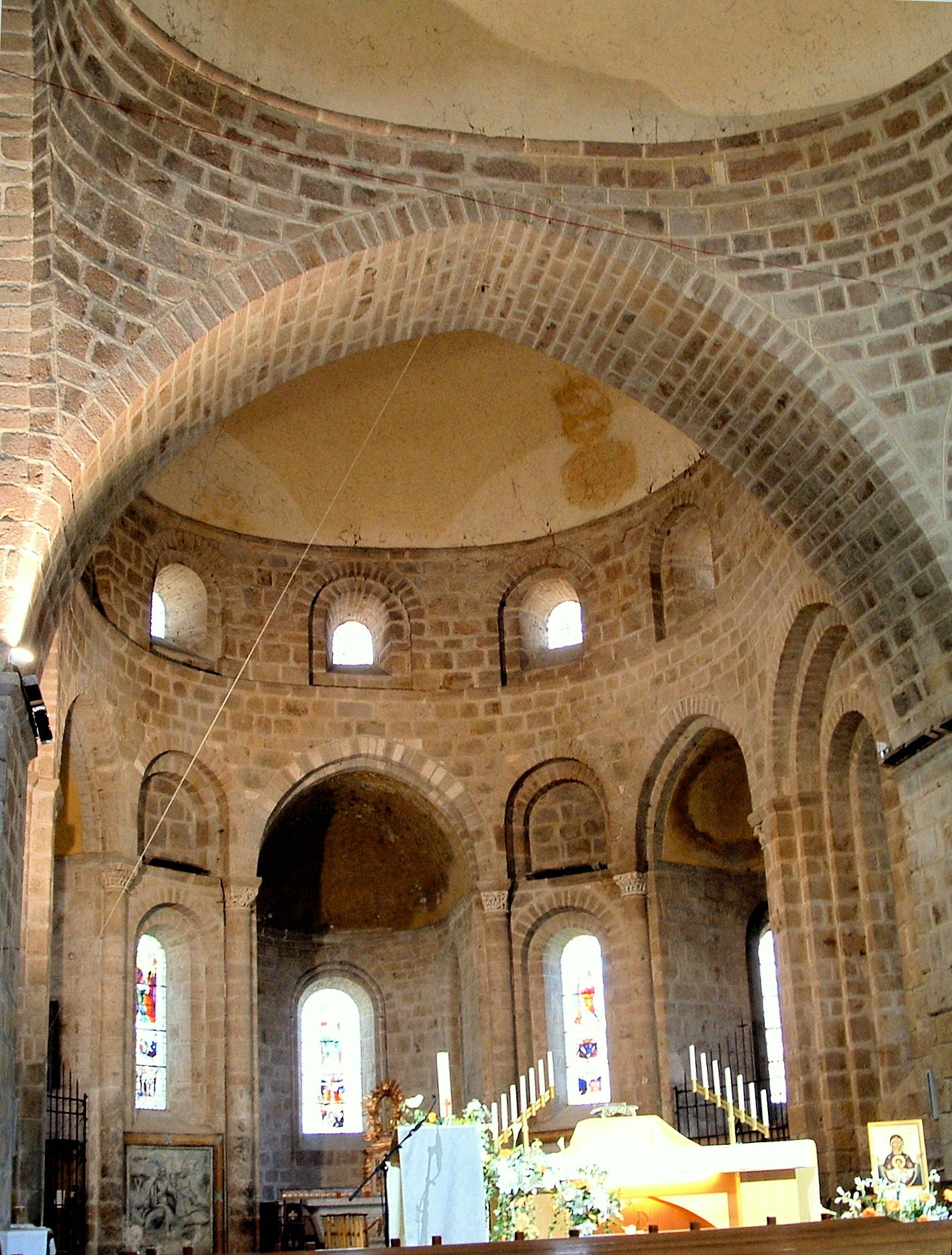
Choir

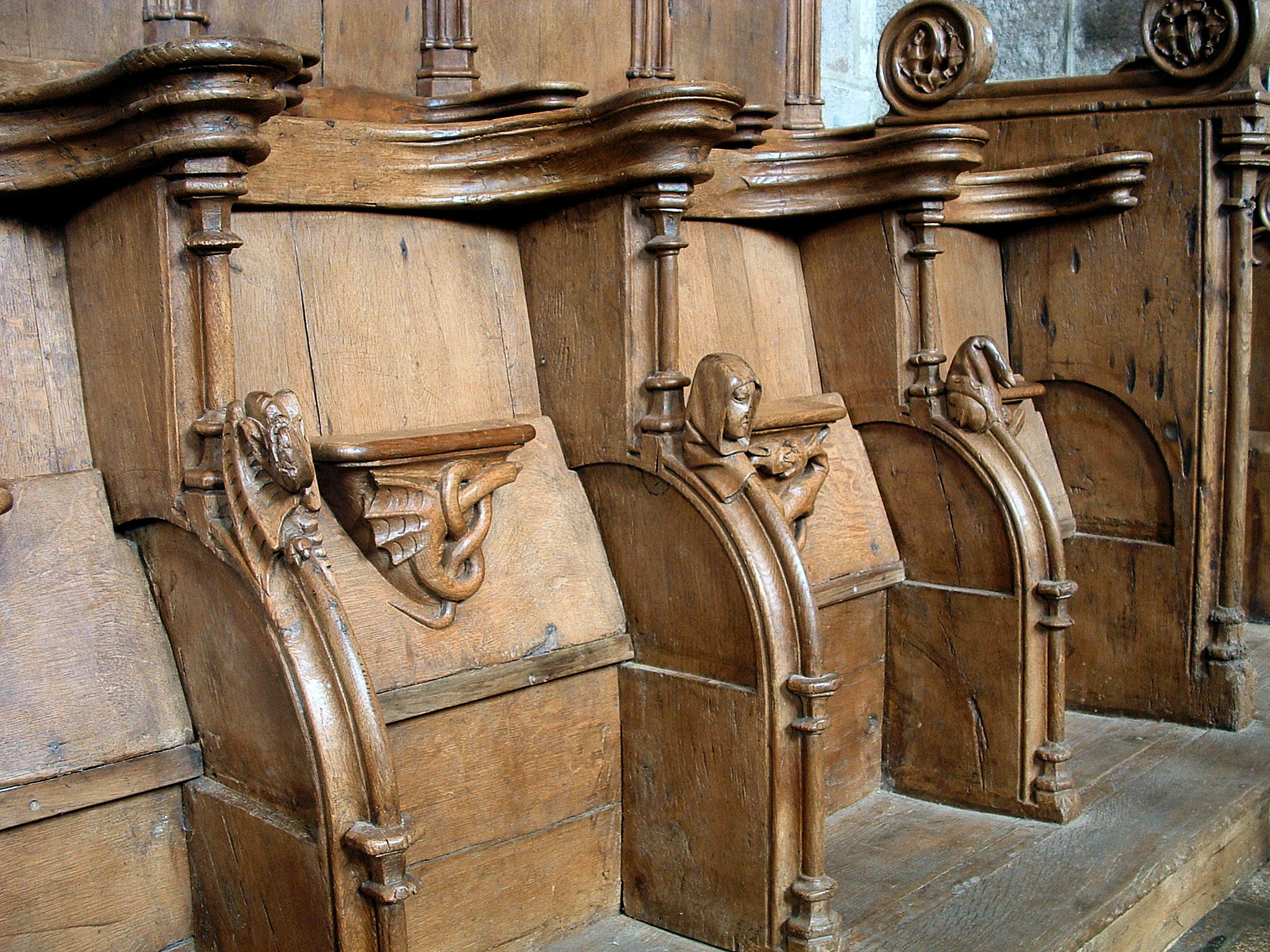
15th century stalls

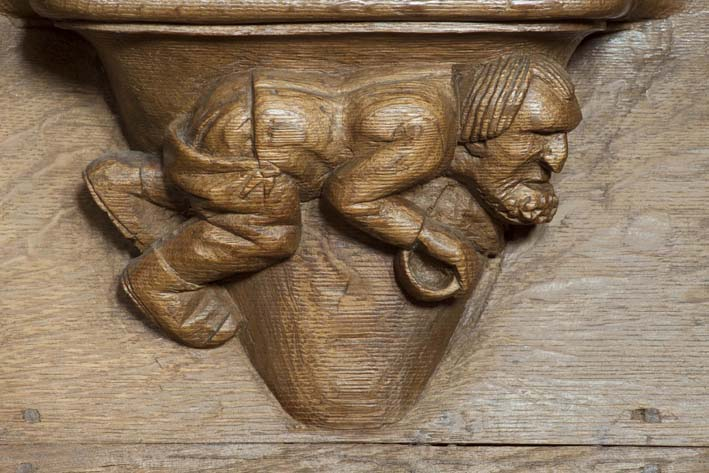
Beggar carved on a misericord

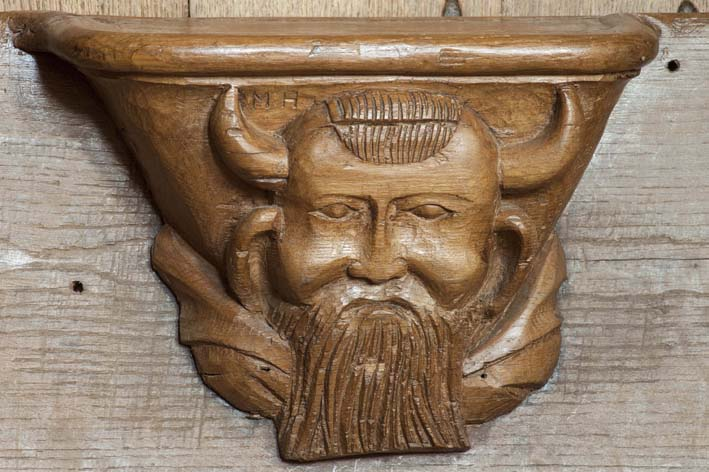
Hybrid half-man, half-animal carved on a misericord

== Construction of the abbey church of Saint Peter and Saint Paul ==
No information is available on the churches that predate the current church.

The consecration of the current church is subject to discussion:

- Félix de Verneilh dates the consecration back to 1143. But the document on which a secretary of the Town Hall of Limoges would have read this date has disappeared.
- 1178 is a date given in several texts for a fire which destroyed the roof and the furniture of the abbey and monastic buildings.
- In 1195, according to Father Nadaud, a new consecration would have taken place following the reconstruction. But this date is considered by some historians to be doubtful.
- 9 May 1211 is the date of consecration by Bishop Jean de Veyrac given by the monk Bernard Ithier contemporary to the event. This is the date that was chosen by the Maurists.

An attempt at the chronology of the construction has been proposed by cross-checking the dates given above with other domed churches in the region:

- 1117, domes in Saint-Avit-Sénieur (no longer present)
- 1119, eastern dome of Cahors Cathedral
- Around 1110, western dome of Angoulême Cathedral consecrated in 1128
- Before 1140, end of construction of the Souillac Abbey

Stylistic comparisons make it probable that the two spans of the nave with domes were built before 1143. The same is probably true of the dome of the transept crossing.

It is probable that the fire of 1178 must have necessitated the restoration of the choir of the abbey which must have been the most affected, but retaining the initial plan because it recalls those of Cahors, Souillac and Vigeois built around 1130.

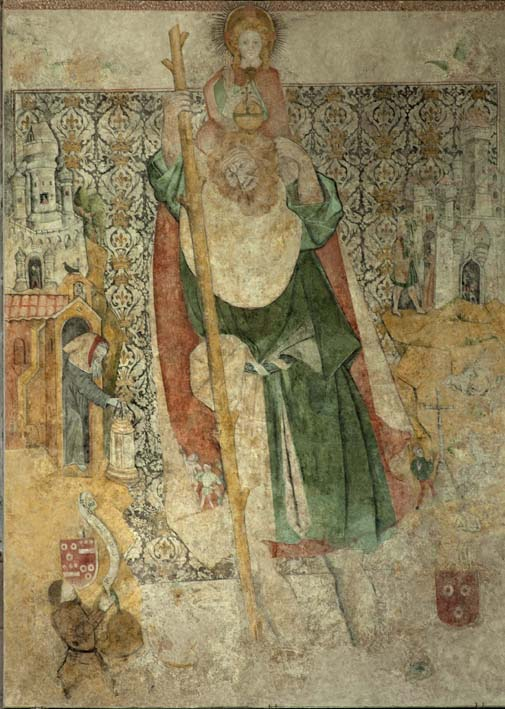
15th-century fresco representing Saint Christopher

Some have pointed out that while the destruction has been limited, the certain date of consecration of 1211 appears late. This date would be due to the partial reconstruction of the buttresses and apses, which would reflect the difference between the two buttresses.

The porch tower dates from the beginning of the 13th century. Elements of the base of the older bell tower may have been reused in the porch tower, but the vault is Gothic. During the administration of Abbot Hugues de Maumont (1195–1228), the third floor of the porch tower, the religious cloister and the information cloister were built (“fecit feri claustrum per integrum et claustrum de infirmatorio and tertiam partem clocherii superiorem ').

The western wall of the southern brace had to be redone in the 17th century.

Lightning destroyed on 18 May 1734 the small frame bell tower surmounting the crossing of the transept. It was rebuilt, but no longer exists.

The top floor of the western bell tower was confined to turrets similar to the Eymoutiers bell tower. It collapsed on 29 March 1783. It was replaced at the beginning of the 19th century by a belfry-wall.

The abbey church was classified as historical monuments by the list of 1862.

During the restoration of 1951, a 15th-century painting of Saint Christopher on a pillar of the transept crossing was unearthed.

== Architecture of the abbey ==
Ramparts surrounded the abbey estate.

All the buildings date from the 12th and 13th centuries but have been restored several times. They are part of a quadrilateral of which the nave of the church constitutes one of the sides.

=== Abbey church ===
The abbey church was built over a long period: the nave during the first half of the 12th century, the choir and transept after the fire of 1178 and the bell tower at the beginning of the 13th century. It is the only abbey with a row of domes in Limousin and a jewel of Romanesque art.

In the 16th century the interior was restored, in particular with the arrangement of sculpted stalls.

=== Monastic buildings ===
Restored, the abbey church regained its function in 1635. One hundred years later, the cloister and the conventual buildings were completely rebuilt but respecting the Romanesque architecture.

The cloister disappeared at the beginning of the 20th century when the premises housed the porcelain factory.

The current monastic buildings are from the 18th century. They take the shape of an E with three of the sides of the monastic complex and a central wing. All have sober lines and are covered with gable roofs.

== See also ==
- High medieval domes

== Sources ==
- "Abbaye", Renaissance de Solignac-Le Vigen (in French)
- Bories, Jean-Bernard Marie; Bozo, Pierre-Antoine (10 June 2021), "Communiqué", diocese-limoges.fr
- Bories, Dom Jean-Bernard Marie, Père Abbé de Saint-Joseph de Clairval (June 2021), "Renaissance de l'Abbaye de Solignac : Interview exclusive", Supplément au Sillon (in French)
- Champagne, Sébastien (23 May 2009), "Solignac", detours-en-limousin.com
- Didron, Adolphe Napoléon; Didron, Edouard (1860), "L'Abbaye de Solignac", Annales archéologiques, 20, Bureau des Annales Archéologiques
- Havard, Henry (1896), Histoire de l'orfèvrerie française (in French), Paris: Librairies-imprimeries réunies, p. 472
- Inconnu, L'Abbaye de Solignac, son histoire, son avenir ! (PDF)
- "L'abbatiale Saint-Pierre de Solignac", meconnu.fr (in French)
- Laubat, Edmond (April 2009), "Bref historique de l'Abbaye" (PDF), Revue d'information municipale de Solignac (in French)
- "PA00100501 Ancienne abbaye", Base Mérimée (in French), Ministère français de la Culture
- "PA00100503 Eglise Saint-Pierre", Base Mérimée (in French), Ministère français de la Culture
- Prieuré St Joseph (in French), Diocèse de Limoges, 2021
- Retour à Solignac (in French), Missionnaires oblats de Marie Immaculée
- Roy-Pierrefitte, L'Abbé (1860), "Notice historique et descriptive de l'abbaye de Solignac", Congrès scientifique de France. 16th session. Mémoires et procès-verbaux. (in French), vol. 2
