= Le Palais-sur-Vienne =

- Commune
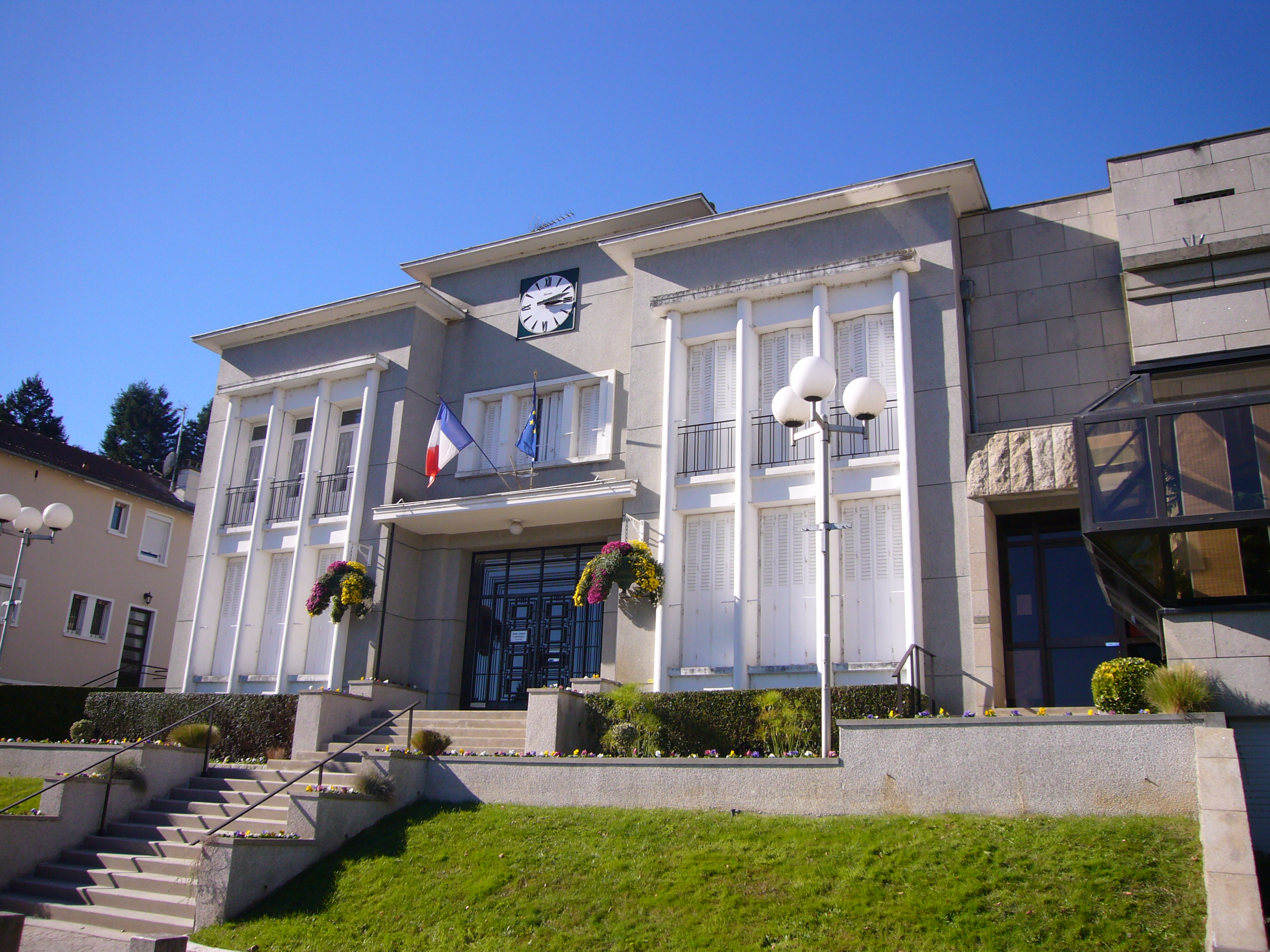
- The town hall in Le Palais-sur-Vienne

- Coat of arms
- Location of Le Palais-sur-Vienne
- Location within France Location within Nouvelle-Aquitaine
- Coordinates: 45°51′54″N 1°19′27″E
- Country: France
- Region: Nouvelle-Aquitaine
- Department: Haute-Vienne
- Arrondissement: Limoges
- Canton: Limoges-5
- Intercommunality: CU Limoges Métropole

Government
  - Mayor (2020–2026): Ludovic Géraudie
- Area^{1}: 10.33 km^{2} (3.99 sq mi)
- Highest elevation: 360 m (1,180 ft)
- Lowest elevation: 220 m (720 ft)
- Population (2023): 5,775
  - Density: 559.1/km^{2} (1,448/sq mi)
- Time zone: UTC+01:00 (CET)
  - Summer (DST): UTC+02:00 (CEST)
- INSEE/Postal code: 87113 /87410
- ^{1} French Land Register data, which excludes lakes, ponds, glaciers > 1 km^{2} (0.386 sq mi or 247 acres) and river estuaries.

Le Palais-sur-Vienne (French pronunciation: [lə palɛ syʁ vjɛn]; Occitan: Lu Palaiç) is a commune in the Haute-Vienne department in the Nouvelle-Aquitaine region in west-central France.

== Population ==
Inhabitants are known as Palaisiens in French.

Historical population
Year	Pop.	±% p.a.
1968	2,621	—
1975	3,863	+5.70%
1982	5,038	+3.87%
1990	6,085	+2.39%
1999	5,726	−0.67%
2007	5,738	+0.03%
2012	6,073	+1.14%
2017	6,042	−0.10%
2023	5,775	−0.75%
Source: INSEE

== See also ==
- Communes of the Haute-Vienne department
