= Rilhac-Rancon =

- Commune
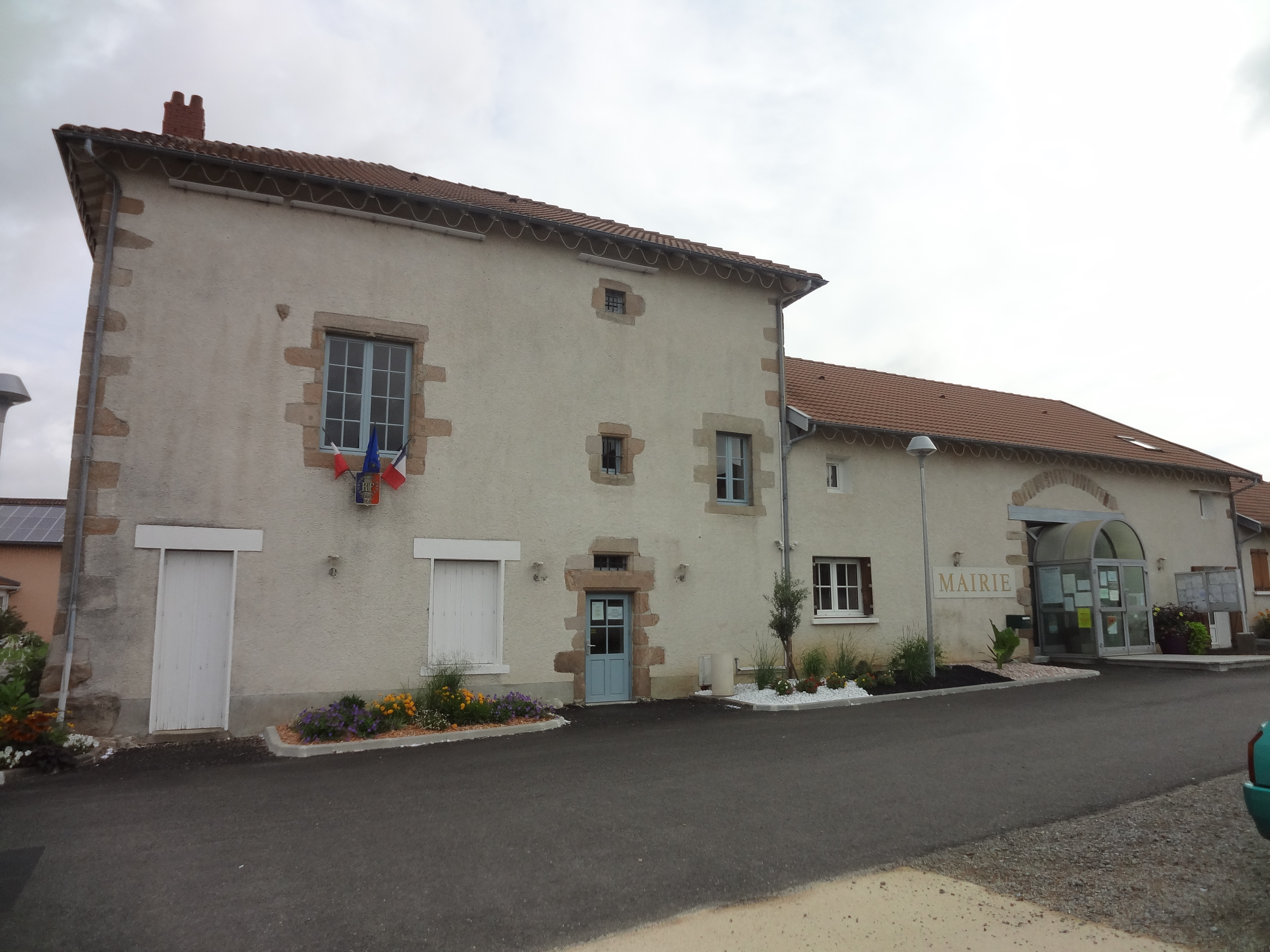
- The town hall in Rilhac-Rancon
- Location of Rilhac-Rancon
- Location within France Location within Nouvelle-Aquitaine
- Coordinates: 45°53′52″N 1°19′10″E
- Country: France
- Region: Nouvelle-Aquitaine
- Department: Haute-Vienne
- Arrondissement: Limoges
- Canton: Limoges-5
- Intercommunality: CU Limoges Métropole

Government
  - Mayor (2020–2026): Nadine Burgaud
- Area^{1}: 17.42 km^{2} (6.73 sq mi)
- Highest elevation: 377 m (1,237 ft)
- Lowest elevation: 254 m (833 ft)
- Population (2023): 4,805
  - Density: 275.8/km^{2} (714.4/sq mi)
- Time zone: UTC+01:00 (CET)
  - Summer (DST): UTC+02:00 (CEST)
- INSEE/Postal code: 87125 /87570
- ^{1} French Land Register data, which excludes lakes, ponds, glaciers > 1 km^{2} (0.386 sq mi or 247 acres) and river estuaries.

Rilhac-Rancon (French pronunciation: [ʁijak ʁɑ̃kɔ̃]; Occitan: Rilhac (Rancom)) is a commune in the Haute-Vienne department in the Nouvelle-Aquitaine region in west-central France.

== Population ==
Historical population
Year	Pop.	±% p.a.
1968	1,061	—
1975	2,188	+10.89%
1982	3,006	+4.64%
1990	3,423	+1.64%
1999	3,652	+0.72%
2007	4,038	+1.26%
2012	4,397	+1.72%
2017	4,573	+0.79%
2023	4,805	+0.83%
Source: INSEE

Inhabitants are known as Rilhacois in French.

== See also ==
- Communes of the Haute-Vienne department
