= Saint-Jouvent =

- Commune
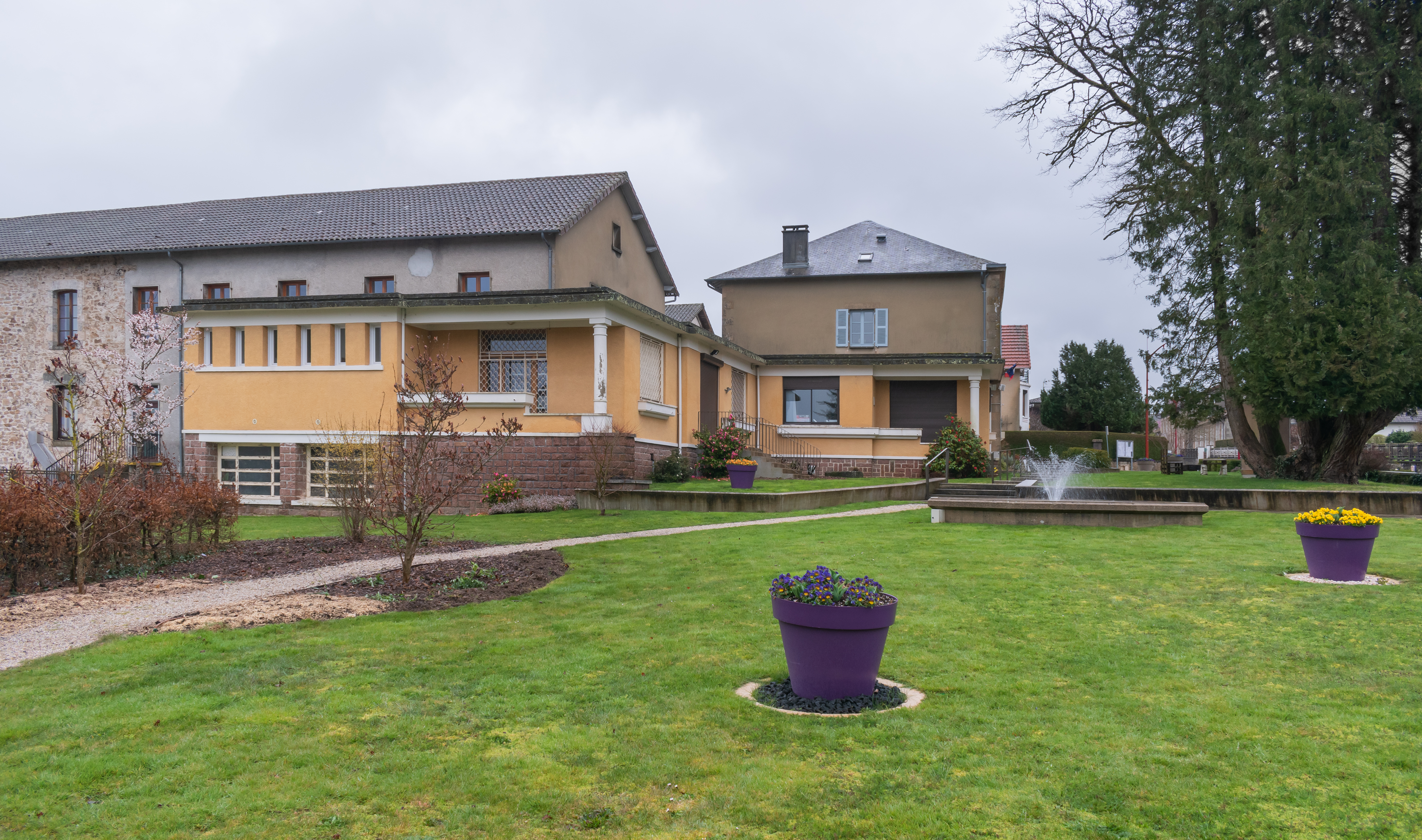
- Town hall of Saint-Jouvent
- Location of Saint-Jouvent
- Location within France Location within Nouvelle-Aquitaine
- Coordinates: 45°57′28″N 1°12′20″E
- Country: France
- Region: Nouvelle-Aquitaine
- Department: Haute-Vienne
- Arrondissement: Limoges
- Canton: Couzeix

Government
  - Mayor (2020–2026): Jany Claude Solis
- Area^{1}: 24.96 km^{2} (9.64 sq mi)
- Highest elevation: 437 m (1,434 ft)
- Lowest elevation: 305 m (1,001 ft)
- Population (2023): 1,625
  - Density: 65.10/km^{2} (168.6/sq mi)
- Time zone: UTC+01:00 (CET)
  - Summer (DST): UTC+02:00 (CEST)
- INSEE/Postal code: 87152 /87510
- ^{1} French Land Register data, which excludes lakes, ponds, glaciers > 1 km^{2} (0.386 sq mi or 247 acres) and river estuaries.

Saint-Jouvent (French pronunciation: [sɛ̃ ʒuvɑ̃]; Occitan: Sent Jauvenç) is a commune in the Haute-Vienne department in the Nouvelle-Aquitaine region in west-central France.

== See also ==
- Communes of the Haute-Vienne department
