= Peyrilhac =

- Commune
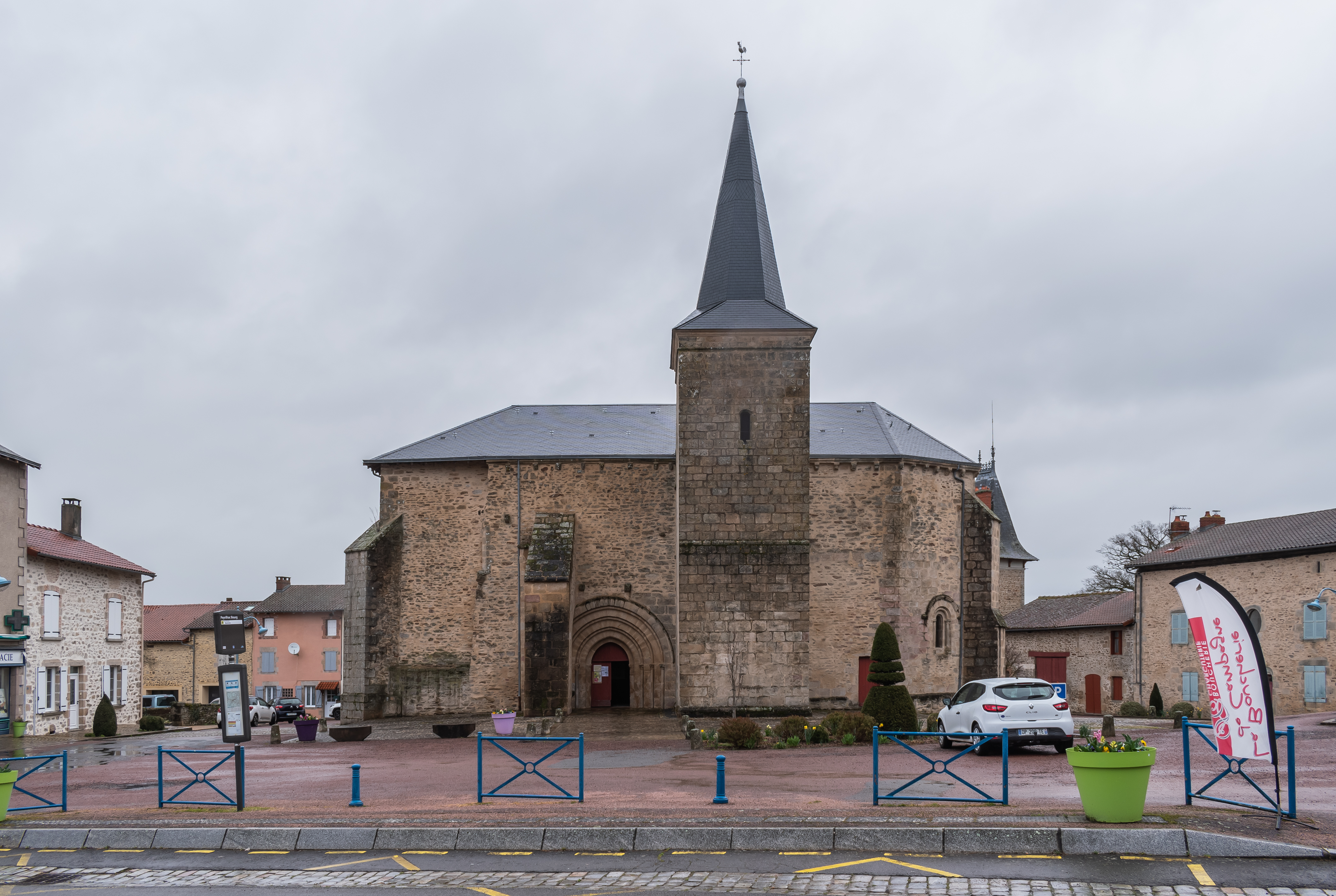
- The church in Peyrilhac
- Location of Peyrilhac
- Location within France Location within Nouvelle-Aquitaine
- Coordinates: 45°57′02″N 1°08′12″E
- Country: France
- Region: Nouvelle-Aquitaine
- Department: Haute-Vienne
- Arrondissement: Limoges
- Canton: Couzeix
- Intercommunality: CU Limoges Métropole

Government
  - Mayor (2020–2026): Claude Compain
- Area^{1}: 38.63 km^{2} (14.92 sq mi)
- Highest elevation: 383 m (1,257 ft)
- Lowest elevation: 257 m (843 ft)
- Population (2023): 1,365
  - Density: 35.34/km^{2} (91.52/sq mi)
- Time zone: UTC+01:00 (CET)
  - Summer (DST): UTC+02:00 (CEST)
- INSEE/Postal code: 87118 /87510
- ^{1} French Land Register data, which excludes lakes, ponds, glaciers > 1 km^{2} (0.386 sq mi or 247 acres) and river estuaries.

Peyrilhac (French pronunciation: [peʁijak]; Occitan: Pairilhac) is a commune in the Haute-Vienne department in the Nouvelle-Aquitaine region in west-central France.

Inhabitants are known as Peyrilhacois.

== See also ==
- Communes of the Haute-Vienne department
