= Saint-Gence =

- Commune
- Location of Saint-Gence
- Location within France Location within Nouvelle-Aquitaine
- Coordinates: 45°55′21″N 1°08′19″E
- Country: France
- Region: Nouvelle-Aquitaine
- Department: Haute-Vienne
- Arrondissement: Limoges
- Canton: Couzeix
- Intercommunality: CU Limoges Métropole

Government
  - Mayor (2020–2026): Serge Roux
- Area^{1}: 21.77 km^{2} (8.41 sq mi)
- Highest elevation: 432 m (1,417 ft)
- Lowest elevation: 256 m (840 ft)
- Population (2023): 2,204
  - Density: 101.2/km^{2} (262.2/sq mi)
- Time zone: UTC+01:00 (CET)
  - Summer (DST): UTC+02:00 (CEST)
- INSEE/Postal code: 87143 /87510
- ^{1} French Land Register data, which excludes lakes, ponds, glaciers > 1 km^{2} (0.386 sq mi or 247 acres) and river estuaries.

Saint-Gence (French pronunciation: [sɛ̃ ʒɑ̃s]; Occitan: Sent Gençan) is a commune in the Haute-Vienne department in the Nouvelle-Aquitaine region in west-central France.

== Demographics ==
Inhabitants are known as Saint-Gençois in French.

Historical population
Year	Pop.	±% p.a.
1968	617	—
1975	704	+1.90%
1982	1,071	+6.18%
1990	1,311	+2.56%
1999	1,489	+1.42%
2007	1,897	+3.07%
2012	2,051	+1.57%
2017	2,134	+0.80%
2023	2,204	+0.54%
Source: INSEE

== Entertainment ==
There is an annual food and wine festival in Saint-Gence, La Vinigast.

== See also ==
- Communes of the Haute-Vienne department
