= Chaptelat =

Chaptelat Chaptalac (Occitan)
- Commune
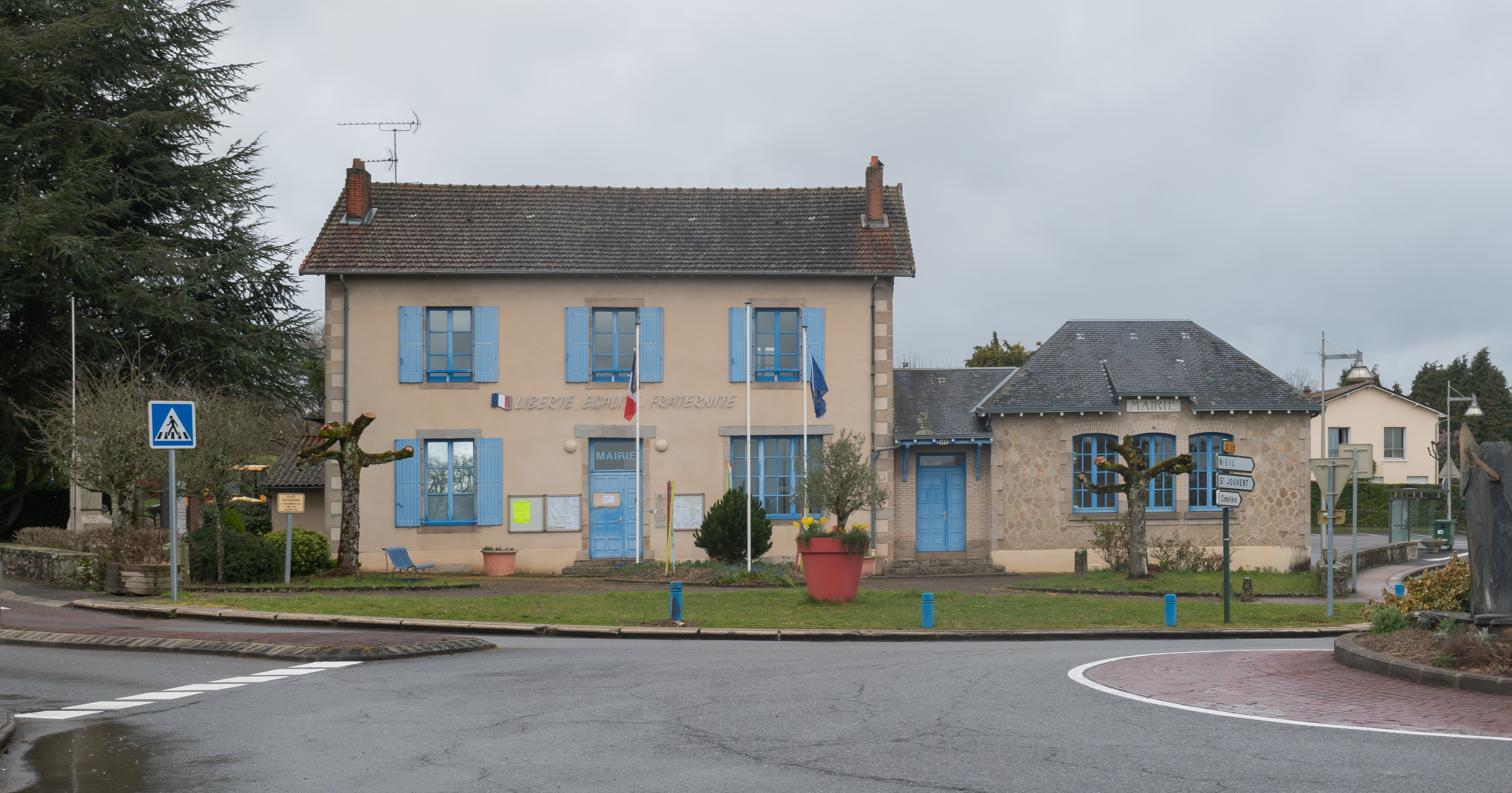
- Town hall of Chaptelat

- Coat of arms
- Location of Chaptelat
- Location within France Location within Nouvelle-Aquitaine
- Coordinates: 45°54′36″N 1°15′37″E
- Country: France
- Region: Nouvelle-Aquitaine
- Department: Haute-Vienne
- Arrondissement: Limoges
- Canton: Couzeix
- Intercommunality: CU Limoges Métropole

Government
  - Mayor (2020–2026): Julie Lenfant
- Area^{1}: 17.92 km^{2} (6.92 sq mi)
- Highest elevation: 481 m (1,578 ft)
- Lowest elevation: 324 m (1,063 ft)
- Population (2023): 2,093
  - Density: 116.8/km^{2} (302.5/sq mi)
- Demonym: Catalacois(e)
- Time zone: UTC+01:00 (CET)
  - Summer (DST): UTC+02:00 (CEST)
- INSEE/Postal code: 87038 /87270
- ^{1} French Land Register data, which excludes lakes, ponds, glaciers > 1 km^{2} (0.386 sq mi or 247 acres) and river estuaries.

Chaptelat (French: [ʃaptəla]; Occitan: Chaptalac) is a commune in the Haute-Vienne department in the Nouvelle-Aquitaine region in western France.

== Population ==
Historical population
Year	Pop.	±% p.a.
1968	564	—
1975	612	+1.17%
1982	943	+6.37%
1990	1,288	+3.97%
1999	1,465	+1.44%
2007	1,542	+0.64%
2012	1,994	+5.28%
2017	2,121	+1.24%
2023	2,093	−0.22%
Source: INSEE

== See also ==
- Communes of the Haute-Vienne department
