= Veyrac =

- Commune
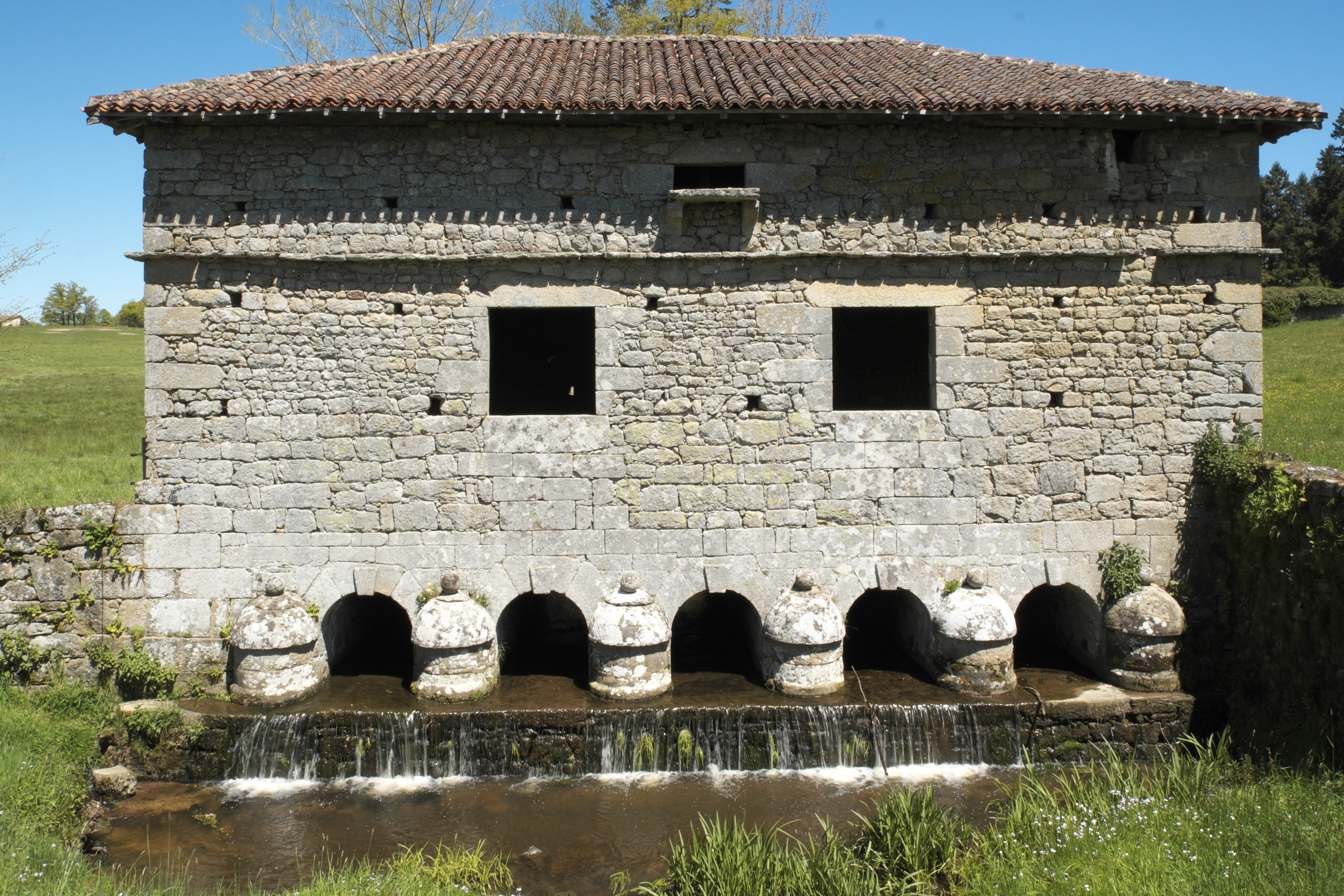
- Veyrac bridge

- Coat of arms
- Location of Veyrac
- Location within France Location within Nouvelle-Aquitaine
- Coordinates: 45°53′47″N 1°06′24″E
- Country: France
- Region: Nouvelle-Aquitaine
- Department: Haute-Vienne
- Arrondissement: Limoges
- Canton: Couzeix
- Intercommunality: CU Limoges Métropole

Government
  - Mayor (2020–2026): Jean-Yves Rigout
- Area^{1}: 33.70 km^{2} (13.01 sq mi)
- Highest elevation: 391 m (1,283 ft)
- Lowest elevation: 220 m (720 ft)
- Population (2023): 2,137
  - Density: 63.41/km^{2} (164.2/sq mi)
- Time zone: UTC+01:00 (CET)
  - Summer (DST): UTC+02:00 (CEST)
- INSEE/Postal code: 87202 /87520
- ^{1} French Land Register data, which excludes lakes, ponds, glaciers > 1 km^{2} (0.386 sq mi or 247 acres) and river estuaries.

Veyrac (French pronunciation: [vɛʁak]; Occitan: Vairac) is a commune in the Haute-Vienne department in the Nouvelle-Aquitaine region in west-central France.

== Population ==
Historical population
Year	Pop.	±% p.a.
1968	1,070	—
1975	1,019	−0.70%
1982	1,202	+2.39%
1990	1,339	+1.36%
1999	1,539	+1.56%
2007	1,925	+2.84%
2012	2,018	+0.95%
2017	2,071	+0.52%
2023	2,137	+0.52%
Source: INSEE

Inhabitants are known as Veyracois in French.

== See also ==
- Communes of the Haute-Vienne department
