= Canton of Limoges-5 =

Coordinates: 45.84°N 1.28°E

The canton of Limoges-5 is an administrative division of the Haute-Vienne department, western France. It was created at the French canton reorganisation which came into effect in March 2015. Its seat is in Limoges.

It consists of the following communes:

1. Limoges (partly)
2. Le Palais-sur-Vienne
3. Rilhac-Rancon
