= Nieul =

- Commune
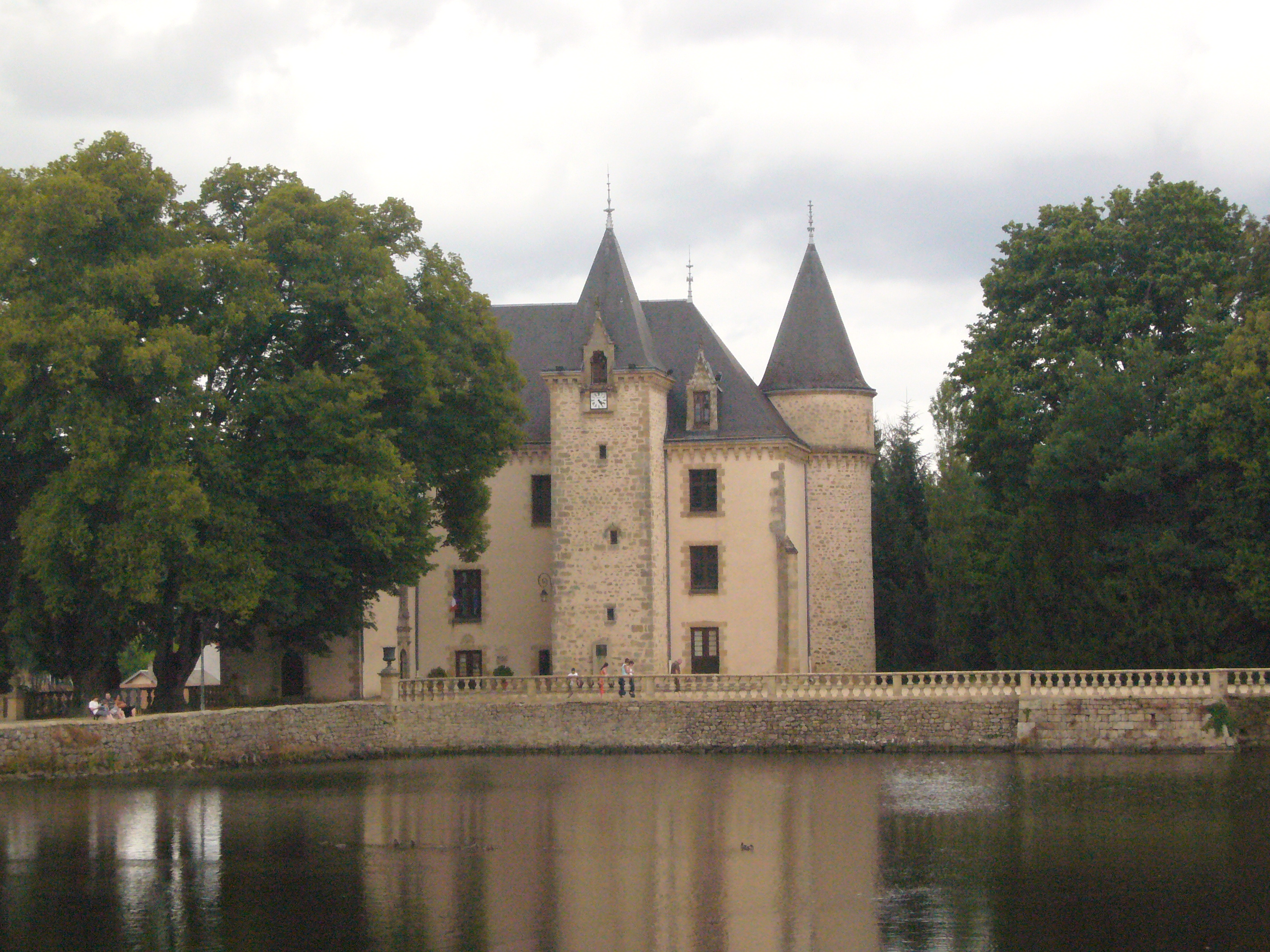
- The Château de Nieul

- Coat of arms
- Location of Nieul
- Location within France Location within Nouvelle-Aquitaine
- Coordinates: 45°55′31″N 1°10′20″E
- Country: France
- Region: Nouvelle-Aquitaine
- Department: Haute-Vienne
- Arrondissement: Limoges
- Canton: Couzeix

Government
  - Mayor (2020–2026): Béatrice Tricard
- Area^{1}: 16.97 km^{2} (6.55 sq mi)
- Highest elevation: 432 m (1,417 ft)
- Lowest elevation: 282 m (925 ft)
- Population (2023): 1,577
  - Density: 92.93/km^{2} (240.7/sq mi)
- Time zone: UTC+01:00 (CET)
  - Summer (DST): UTC+02:00 (CEST)
- INSEE/Postal code: 87107 /87510
- ^{1} French Land Register data, which excludes lakes, ponds, glaciers > 1 km^{2} (0.386 sq mi or 247 acres) and river estuaries.

Nieul (French pronunciation: [njœl]; Occitan: Nuèlh) is a commune in the Haute-Vienne department in the Nouvelle-Aquitaine region in west-central France.

Inhabitants are known as Nieulois in French.

== Communication ==
At Nieul, there was a medium wave broadcasting station, which transmitted on 792 kHz with 300 kW and closed in July 2014. It used as an antenna a 90 metres tall mast radiator insulated against ground.

== See also ==
- Communes of the Haute-Vienne department
