= Canton of Couzeix =

Coordinates: 45.88°N 1.24°E

The canton of Couzeix is an administrative division of the Haute-Vienne department, western France. It was created at the French canton reorganisation which came into effect in March 2015. Its seat is in Couzeix.

It consists of the following communes:

1. Chaptelat
2. Couzeix
3. Nieul
4. Peyrilhac
5. Saint-Gence
6. Saint-Jouvent
7. Veyrac
