= Thillo =

Abbot and hermit (c. 608–702)

Saint Thillo Abbot of Solignac
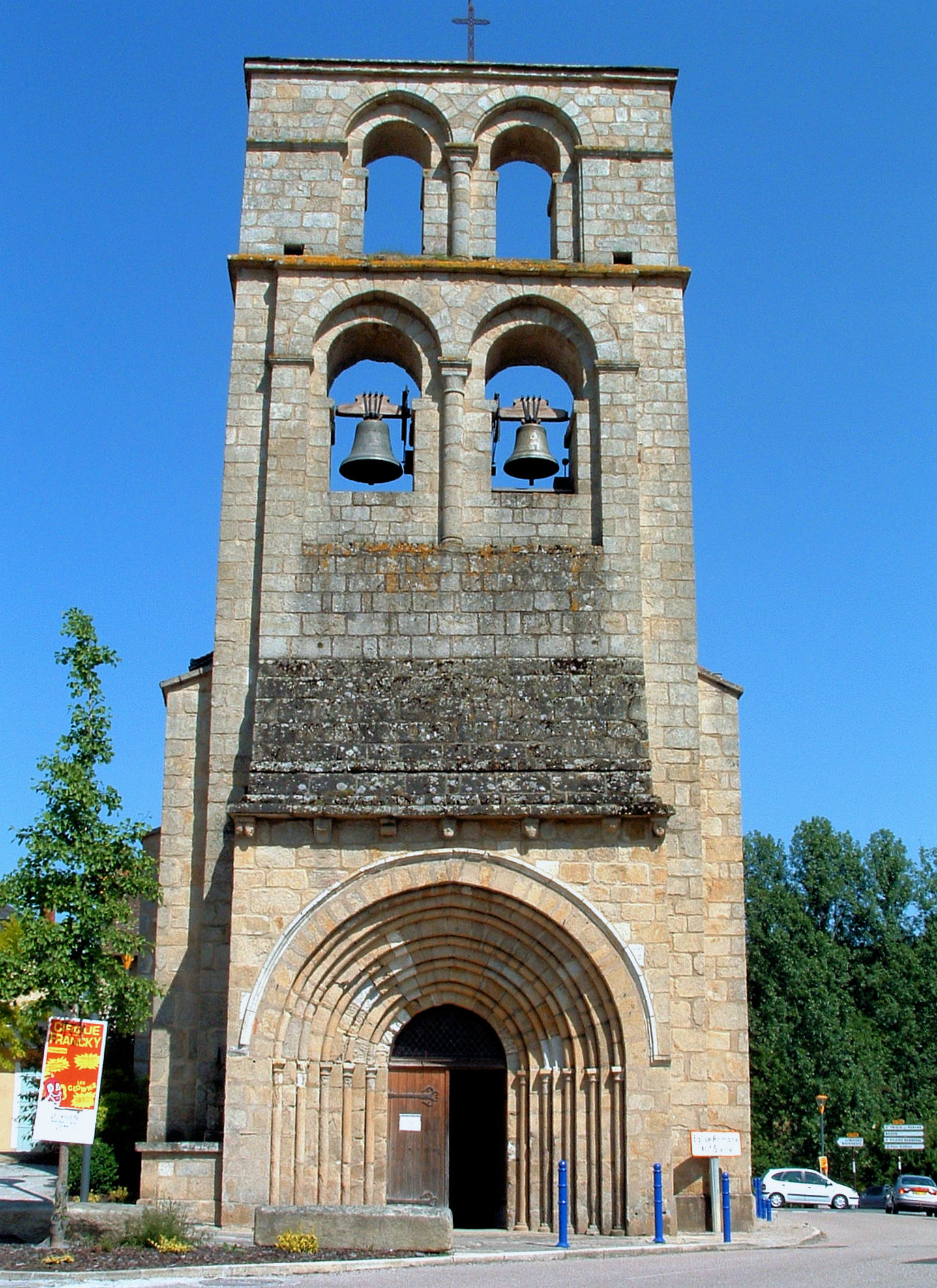
- Le Vigen - Eglise Saint-Mathurin
- Born: c. 608; Saxony
- Residence: Solignac
- Died: 702; Le Vigen
- Feast: 7 January
- Attributes: Benedictine abbot holding a chalice and a pastoral staff

Saint Thillo (or Théau, Tillon, Thielman, Tilloine, Tilman, Tyllo; c. 608–702) was a Saxon slave who was converted by Saint Eligius and became a priest at Solignac Abbey. He accompanied Eloi in missionary work, returned to Solignac, and was made abbot. Unable to handle the responsibility, he left the abbey and became a hermit. His feast day is 7 January.

== Life ==
Saint Thillo was kidnapped by bandits from his family in Saxony as a child. He was sold as a slave to Saint Eligius, Bishop of Noyon, who freed him. Eloi baptized him and treated him as his son. Thillo apprenticed as a goldsmith at Solignac Abbey, then became a priest. He accompanied Eloi on evangelical missions in Flanders and the Netherlands.

After Eloi died in 659 he became a hermit, living in Nedde (Haute Vienne) then Brageac (Cantal). He returned to Limousin as an old man in 698 and was allowed to build a cell outside the walls of Solignac Abbey, near a market that would become the village of Le Vigen, where he died in 702 aged almost 100. His grave was later transferred to the Solignac abbey church. The church of Saint Mathurin du Vigen was built on the site of the oratory where Thillo died, but no trace remains of the oratory.

== Monks of Ramsgate account ==
The monks of St Augustine's Abbey, Ramsgate wrote in their Book of Saints (1921),

Thillo (Tilman) (St.) (Jan. 7)
(8th cent.) By birth a Saxon. He was carried as a prisoner of war into Flanders, where he was baptised by Saint Eligius. He worked as a missionary in the country about Tournai and Courtrai, but retired some years before his death to the Abbey of Solignac, where he passed away A.D. 702.

== Butler's account ==
The hagiographer Alban Butler (1710–1773) wrote in his Lives of the Fathers, Martyrs, and Other Principal Saints under January 7,

St. Thillo, called in France Theau, in Flanders Tilloine, or Tilman, C. He was by birth a Saxon, and being made captive, was carried into the Low Countries, where he was ransomed and baptized by St. Eligius. That apostolical man sent him to his abbey of Solignac, in Limousin. St. Thillo was called thence by St. Eligius, ordained priest, and employed by him some time at Tournay, and in other parts of the Low Countries. The inhabitants of the country of Isengihen, near Courtray, regarded him as their apostle. Some years after the death of St. Eligius, St. Thillo returned to Solignac, and lived a recluse near that abbey, in simplicity, devotion, and austerities, imitating the Antonies and Macariuses. He died in his solitude, about the year 702, of his age ninety-four, and was honoured with miracles.

His name is famous in the French and Belgic calendars, though it occurs not in the Roman. St. Owen, in his life of St. Eligius, names Thillo first among the seven disciples of that saint, who worked with him at his trade of goldsmith, and imitated him in all his religious exercises, before that holy man was engaged in the ministry of the church. Many churches in Flanders, Auvergne, Limousin, and other places, are dedicated to God, under his invocation. The anonymous life of St. Thillo, in Bollandus, is not altogether authentic; the history which Mabillon gives of him from the Breviary of Solignac, is of more authority, (Mab. Sæc. 2. Ben. p. 996.) See also Bulteau, Hist. Ben. T. i. l. 3. c. 16. Molanus in Natal. Sanct. Belgii, &c.

== Baring-Gould's account ==
Sabine Baring-Gould (1834–1924) in his Lives Of The Saints wrote under January 7,

Saint Tyllo, H. (about 700.)

[Cologne, German, and Belgian Martyrologies. The name is sometimes Tyllo, Thillo, or Hillo; in Belgium, Theaulon or Tilman. Authority: A life published in the Bollandists, which agrees with scattered notices of him in various writers.]

Saint Tillo, the Patron of Iseghem, in Belgium, was a son of Saxon parents, but was stolen, when young, from his home, and sold as a slave in Gaul. Saint Eligius, who redeemed many slaves, bought the lad, and being struck with his beauty and intelligence, sent him to the monastery of Solignac, to be educated by Saint Remade, then abbot of Solignac. After his education was complete, he was returned to Saint Eligius, who was a goldsmith, patronized by King Dagobert and the nobles of the court. With him Tillo learned the trade of a goldsmith, and made many vessels and ornaments of gold and silver, encrusted with gems, for the King. Whilst he worked, he had the Holy Scriptures open before him, and as he chased the silver and gold he studied the Word of God. He kept ever in his heart the maxim, “Whatsoever ye would that men should do to you, do ye even so to them,” and all his work was done to the best of his ability, and executed with punctuality. Thus, he found favour with Eligius, and with all the customers of his master. When Eligius left his shop, and became a bishop, he called to the clerical office and to the religious life, his apprentice whom he had bought in the market many years before. Tillo, as priest and monk, showed a pattern of holiness, and was made abbot of Solignac, near Limoges.

But ruling three hundred monks and attending to the worldly affairs of a great monastery, and more than that, the multitude of visitors, made the life one for which the goldsmith’s apprentice, trained to work in silence, and think and read, felt himself unfitted; so one night he fled away and was lost He penetrated the woods and mountains of Auvergne, seeking out a suitable spot for a hermitage, and one day he lit upon a quiet place, hid away among the rocky mountains, into which he could only just crawl on hands and knees. Having got in, he found a pleasant glade, surrounded with trees, having streams watering it from the mountain side, and there were plenty of apple trees, from which he concluded it had been previously a hermitage. Here he lived for some time, praying and reading, and tilling the soil. By degrees, it was rumoured that a holy hermit lived in that glade, and the people of the neighbourhood came to see him, and he called himself Brother Paul. And to all who visited him this was the rule of life he gave, “Believe in God the Father Almighty, and in Jesus Christ his Son, also in the Holy Ghost, three persons, but one God. Keep your mind from vain cogitations and your body pure from all uncleanness; avoid self-conceit, and be instant in prayer."

And when there was ever more and more of a concourse, and many desired to put themselves under his direction, he went forth, and sought out a suitable spot, and found it at Bayac, where he founded a monastery. There he remained some while, till a longing came over him to revisit Solignac, and he fled away when all his monks were asleep, as he had fled previously from Solignac. And when he reached Solignac, he was received with great joy. Then he asked the abbot Gundebert to build him a little cell outside the monastery, in which he might reside with one or two of the brethren who sought a stricter life. His wish was granted, and in this cell he spent the rest of his days.

He is regarded with special veneration at Iseghem, in Flanders, because he visited that place in company with Saint Eligius, and there remained some time teaching the people.

In art, he is represented with a chalice in one hand and an abbatial staff in the other.

== Sources ==
- Baring-Gould, Sabine (1897), The Lives Of The Saints, vol. 1, January, London: J. C. Nimmo This article incorporates text from this source, which is in the public domain.
- Butler, Alban (1798), The Lives of the Primitive Fathers, Martyrs, and Other Principal Saints, vol. I, Edinburgh: J. Moir This article incorporates text from this source, which is in the public domain.
- Rabenstein, Katherine I (1998), "Tillo of Solignac", Saints of the Day – via CatholicSaints.Info
- Saint Théau (in French), Commune du Vigen
- St. Augustine's Abbey, Ramsgate (1921), The Book of saints : a dictionary of servants of God canonized by the Catholic Church, London: A. & C. Black, ltd. This article incorporates text from this source, which is in the public domain.
