= Couzeix =

- Commune
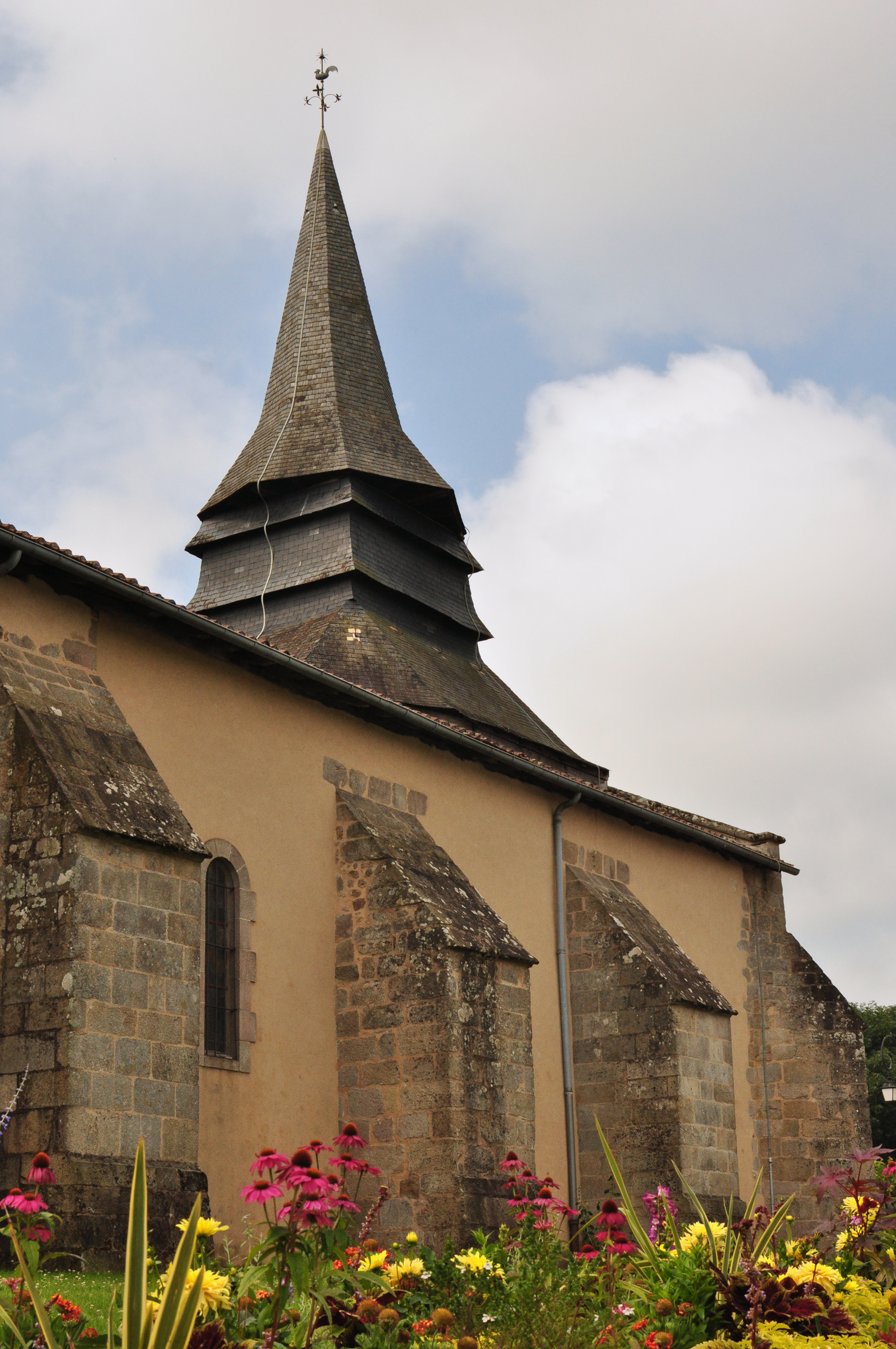
- The church of Sainte-Madeleine, in Couzeix

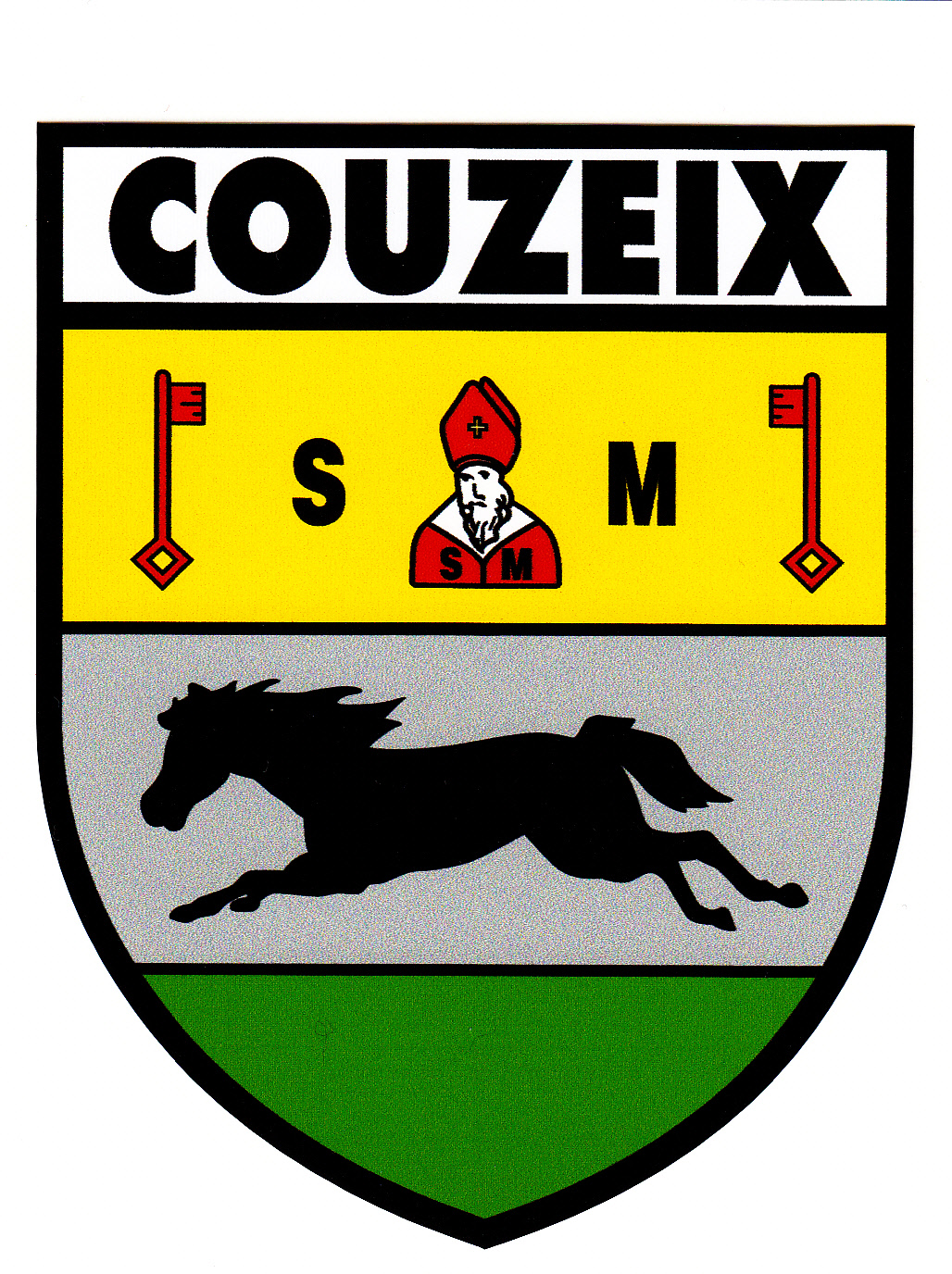
- Coat of arms
- Location of Couzeix
- Location within France Location within Nouvelle-Aquitaine
- Coordinates: 45°52′37″N 1°14′20″E
- Country: France
- Region: Nouvelle-Aquitaine
- Department: Haute-Vienne
- Arrondissement: Limoges
- Canton: Couzeix
- Intercommunality: CU Limoges Métropole

Government
  - Mayor (2020–2026): Sébastien Larcher
- Area^{1}: 30.69 km^{2} (11.85 sq mi)
- Highest elevation: 440 m (1,440 ft)
- Lowest elevation: 260 m (850 ft)
- Population (2023): 10,195
  - Density: 332.2/km^{2} (860.4/sq mi)
- Time zone: UTC+01:00 (CET)
  - Summer (DST): UTC+02:00 (CEST)
- INSEE/Postal code: 87050 /87270
- ^{1} French Land Register data, which excludes lakes, ponds, glaciers > 1 km^{2} (0.386 sq mi or 247 acres) and river estuaries.

Couzeix (French pronunciation: [kuzɛks]; Occitan: Cosés) is a commune in the Haute-Vienne department in the Nouvelle-Aquitaine region in western France.

== Population ==
Inhabitants are known as Couzeixois in French (Occitan: coseinauds).

Historical population
Year	Pop.	±% p.a.
1968	3,004	—
1975	3,958	+4.02%
1982	5,019	+3.45%
1990	6,151	+2.57%
1999	6,635	+0.85%
2007	7,526	+1.59%
2012	8,703	+2.95%
2017	9,268	+1.27%
2023	10,195	+1.60%
Source: INSEE

== See also ==
- Communes of the Haute-Vienne department
