= Parc du Reynou =

Zoo Parc du Reynou
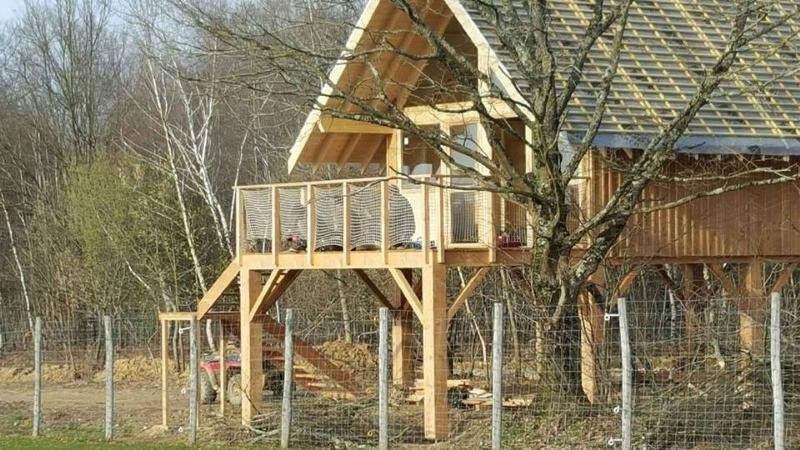
- Interactive map of Zoo Parc du Reynou
- 45°45′33″N 1°17′59″E
- Date opened: 1997
- Location: Le Vigen, Haute-Vienne, France
- Land area: 100 hectares
- No. of animals: 600 (2023)
- No. of species: 130 (2023)
- Memberships: EAZA,
- Website: www.parczooreynou.com

The Parc zoo du Reynou (Occitan: Parc Zoologic Reynou) is a zoological park situated in the Haute-Vienne region, in the commune of Le Vigen. The park covers more than 60 hectares and houses more than 600 animals from over 130 different species. It opened on July 1, 1997 and presents a wide variety of species ranging from pygmy marmosets, the smallest monkey in the world, to Rothschild's giraffes, as well as many other species of wild animals and birds.

It has been designed to allow each animal to reside in a close approximation of its natural environment. The animals are divided geographically into two African plains, two Asian plains, a South American sector, an Australian sector and a mini-farm.

The park is organised around the Haviland family château and atypical rock gardens. The gardens were created by André Laurent at the end of the 19th century, at the request of Charles-Édouard Haviland. Many of the plant species are rare for the region, including giant redwoods and American oaks.

In 2013, the park welcomed snow leopards, bharals and Visayan warty pigs.

In 2016, the Parc zoo du Reynou increased the number of species on show with the construction of a small farm at the heart of the zoo featuring the local bread of cul-noir pig. An island was built in the river to accommodate red pandas. Many other species have also joined the zoo in recent years, including kinkajous, South American Tapirs and onagers.

The lodges opened in 2016 and are available all year round.

In 2017, the park celebrated its 20th anniversary.

== Gallery ==
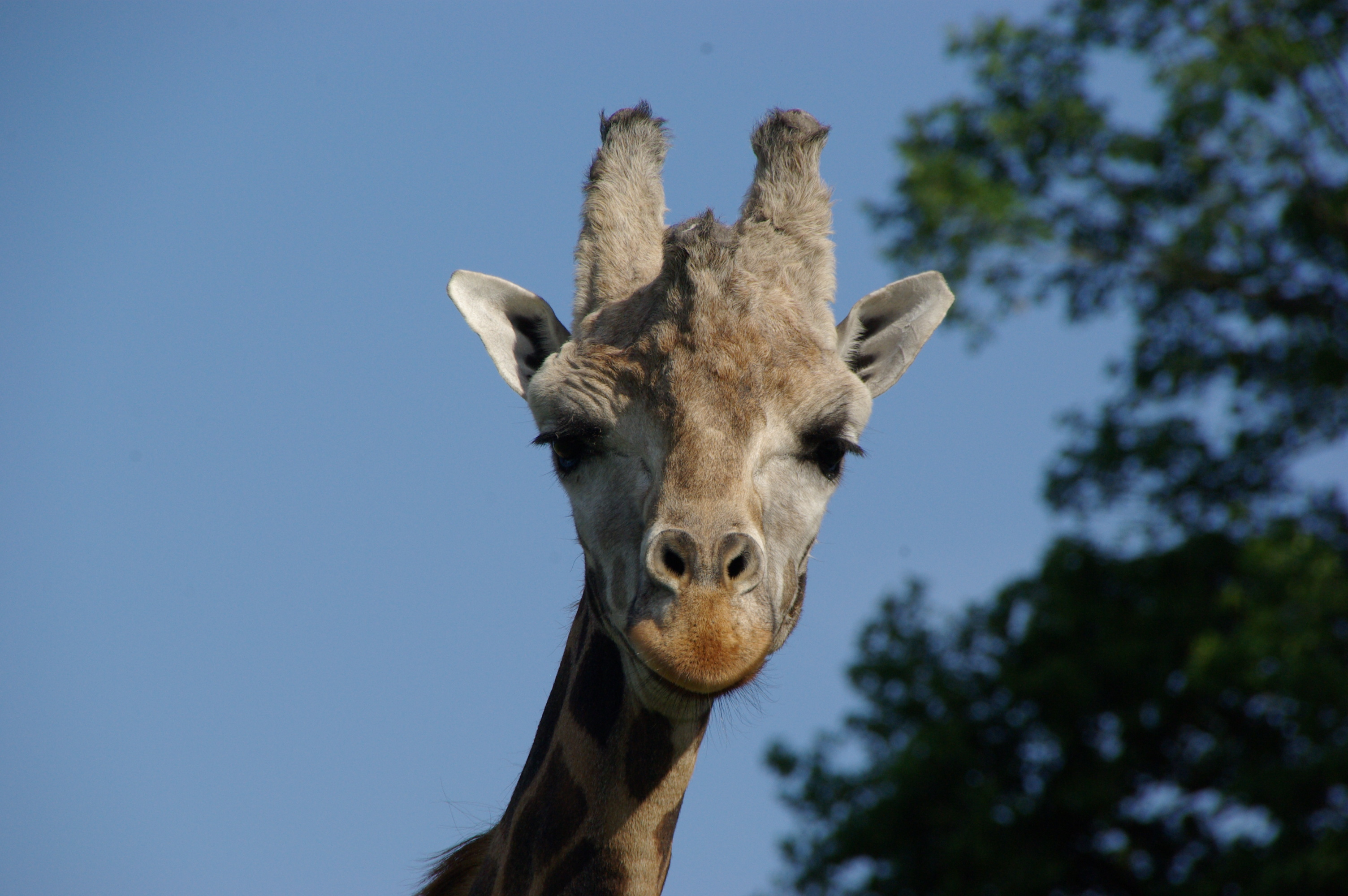
Giraffe at Parc du Reynou

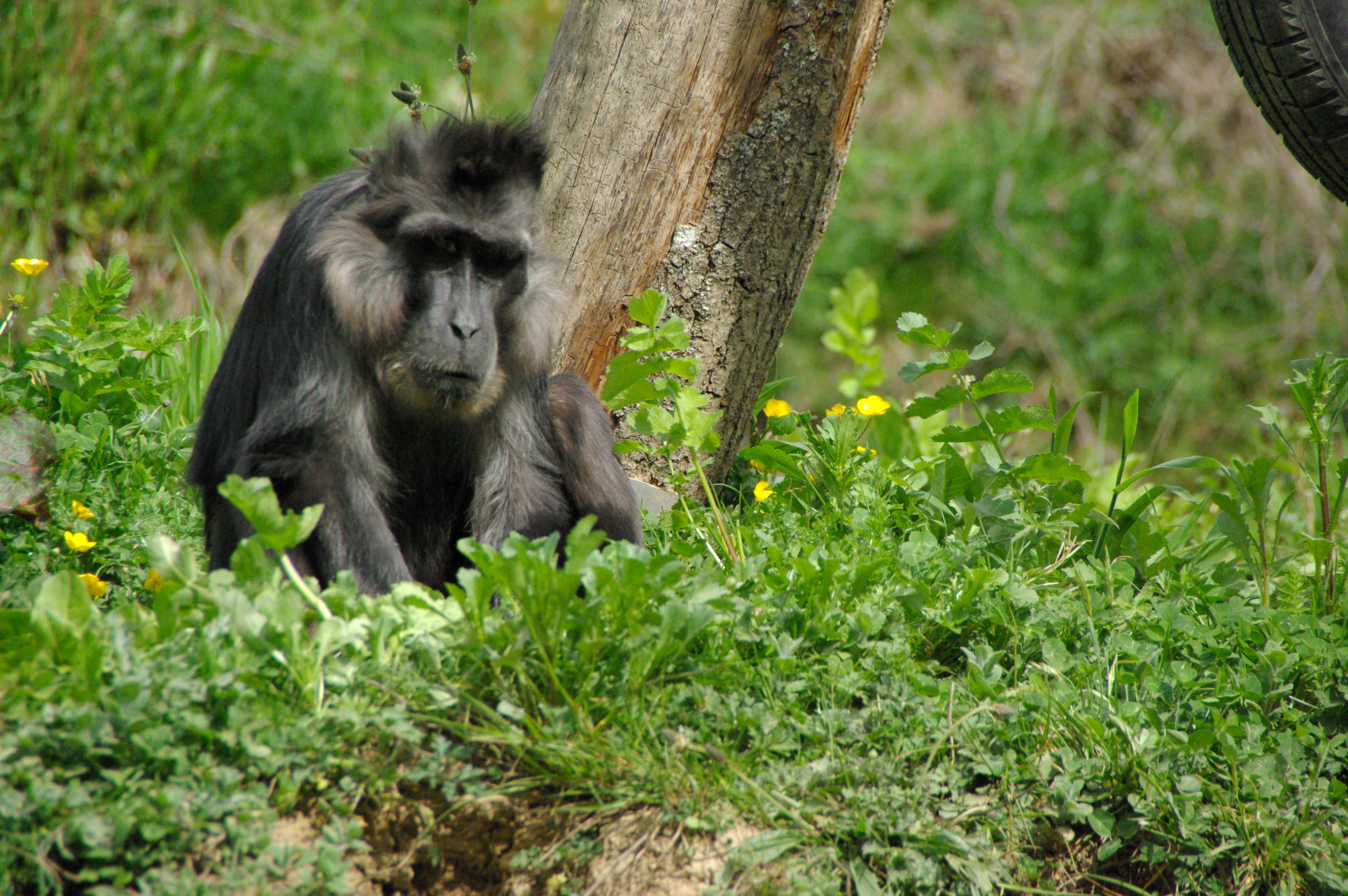
Tonkean Macaque

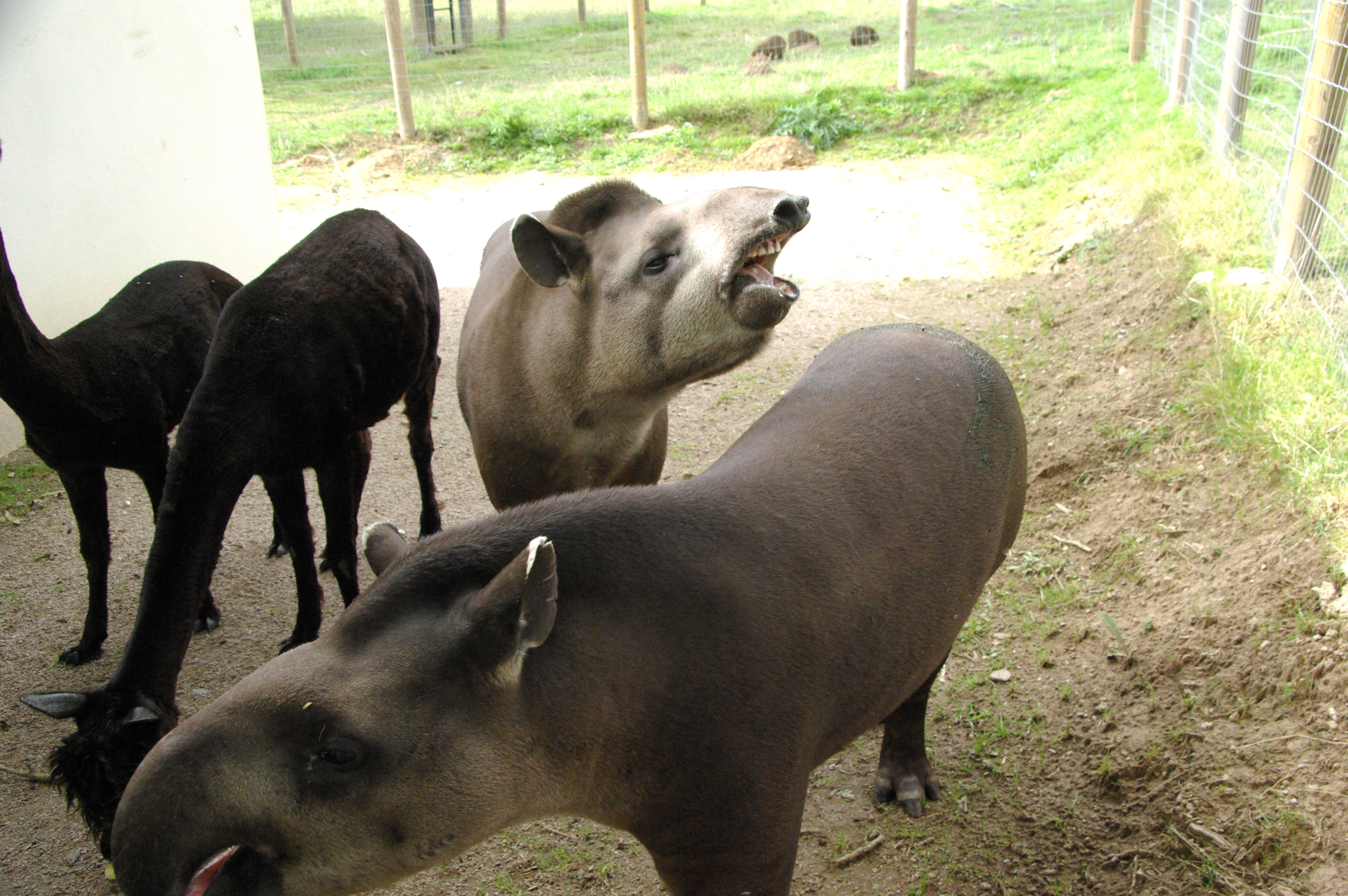
Alpacas and Tapirs

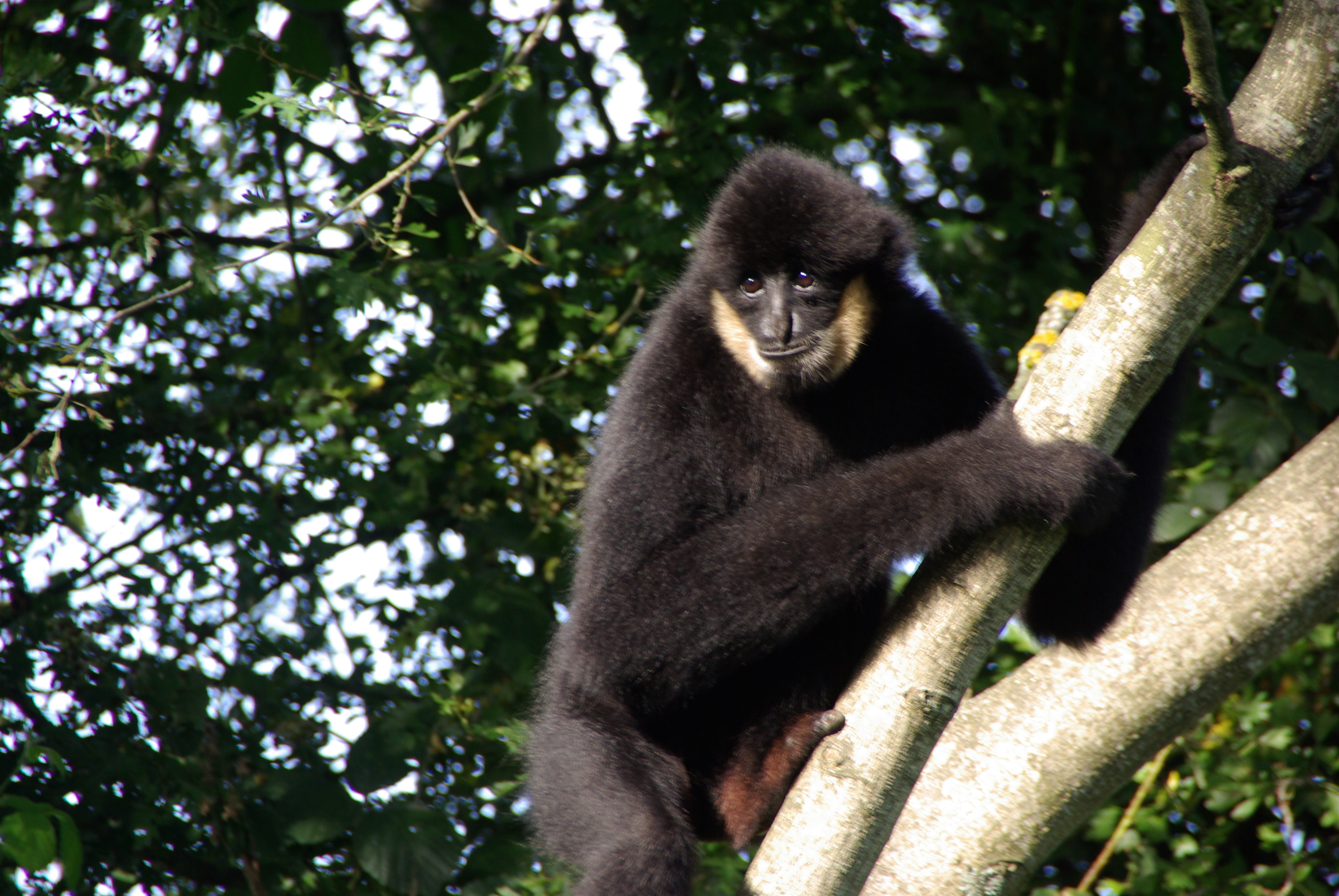
Gibbon at Parc du Reynou

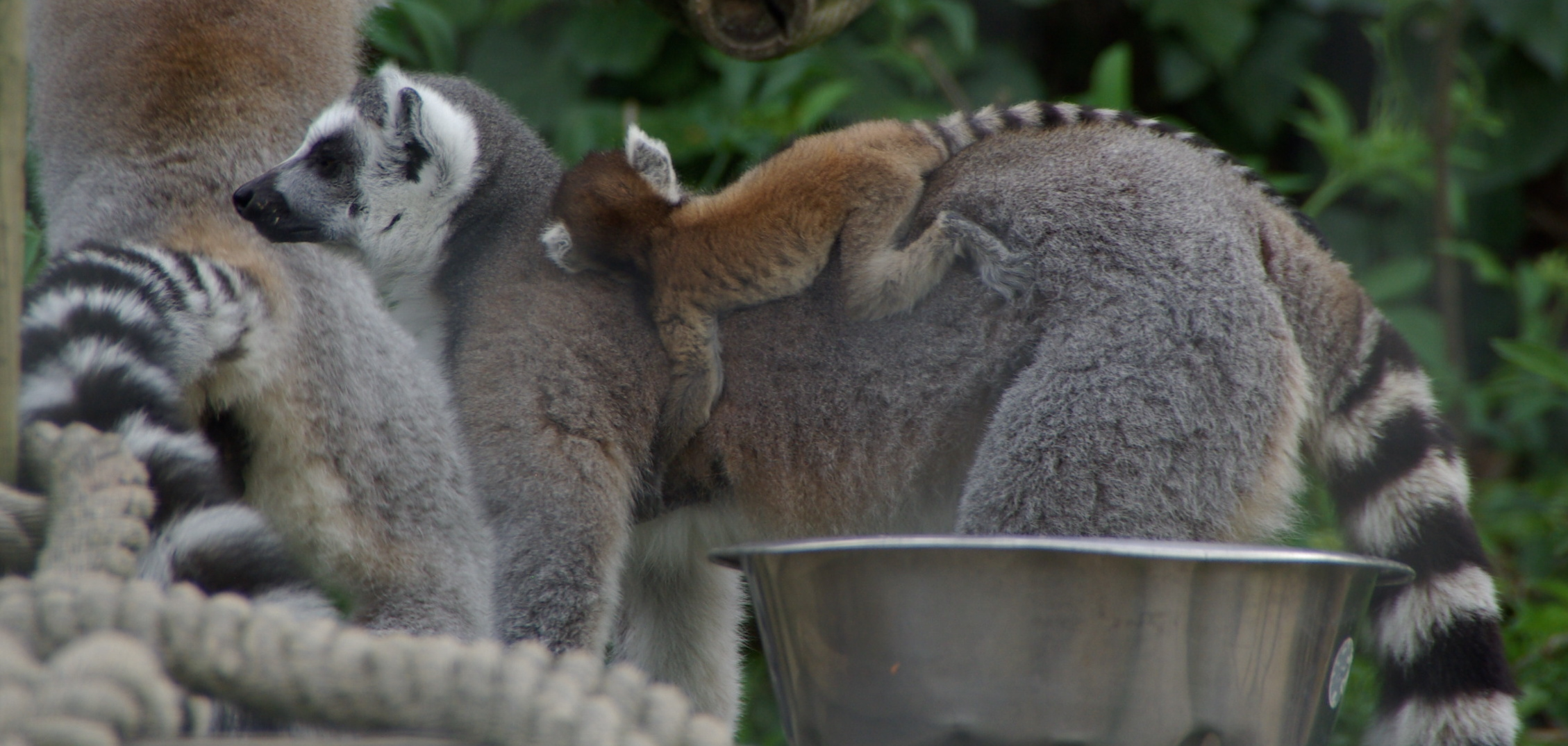
Ring-tailed Lemur and baby
