= Limoges Métropole =

Coordinates: 45.83°N 1.26°E

- Communauté urbaine
- Location within the department
- Country: France
- Region: Nouvelle-Aquitaine
- Department: Haute-Vienne
- No. of communes: {{{nbcomm}}}
- Established: 2002
- Area: 520.6 km^{2} (201.0 sq mi)
- Population (2018): 207,385
  - Density: 398.4/km^{2} (1,032/sq mi)

Communauté urbaine Limoges Métropole is the communauté urbaine, an intercommunal structure, centred on the city of Limoges. It is located in the Haute-Vienne department, in the Nouvelle-Aquitaine region, southwestern France. It was created in November 2002 as the Communauté d'agglomération Limoges Métropole, which was transformed into a communauté urbaine on 1 January 2019. Its area is 520.6 km^{2}. Its population was 207,385 in 2018, of which 131,479 in Limoges proper.

== Composition ==
The communauté d'agglomération consists of the following 20 communes:

1. Aureil
2. Boisseuil
3. Bonnac-la-Côte
4. Chaptelat
5. Condat-sur-Vienne
6. Couzeix
7. Eyjeaux
8. Feytiat
9. Isle
10. Limoges
11. Le Palais-sur-Vienne
12. Panazol
13. Peyrilhac
14. Rilhac-Rancon
15. Saint-Gence
16. Saint-Just-le-Martel
17. Solignac
18. Verneuil-sur-Vienne
19. Veyrac
20. Le Vigen
