= Le Vigen =

- Commune
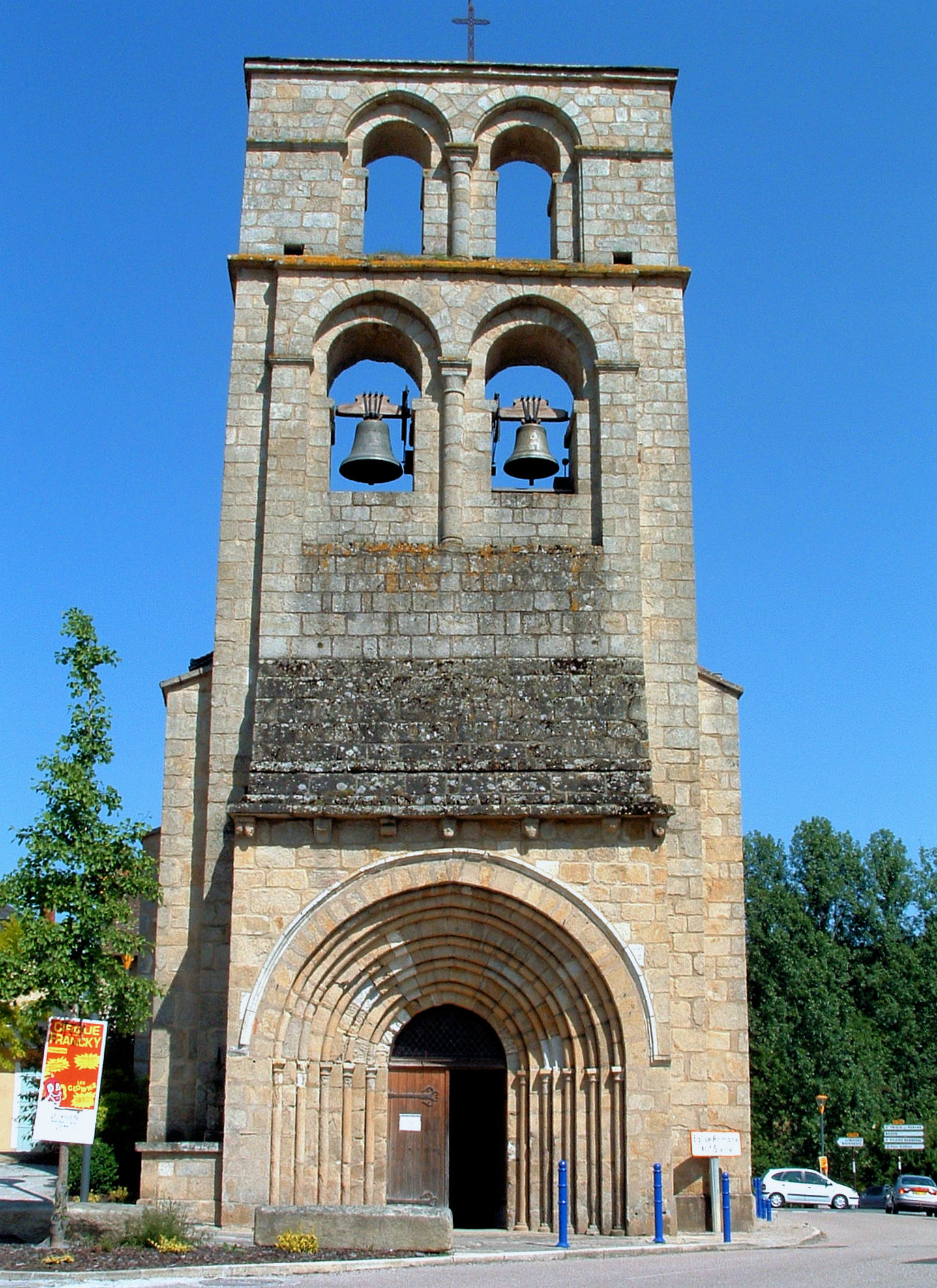
- The church of Saint-Mathurin, in Le Vigen

- Coat of arms
- Location of Le Vigen
- Location within France Location within Nouvelle-Aquitaine
- Coordinates: 45°45′08″N 1°17′22″E
- Country: France
- Region: Nouvelle-Aquitaine
- Department: Haute-Vienne
- Arrondissement: Limoges
- Canton: Condat-sur-Vienne
- Intercommunality: CU Limoges Métropole

Government
  - Mayor (2020–2026): Jean-Luc Bonnet
- Area^{1}: 29.51 km^{2} (11.39 sq mi)
- Highest elevation: 423 m (1,388 ft)
- Lowest elevation: 220 m (720 ft)
- Population (2023): 2,310
  - Density: 78.3/km^{2} (203/sq mi)
- Time zone: UTC+01:00 (CET)
  - Summer (DST): UTC+02:00 (CEST)
- INSEE/Postal code: 87205 /87110
- ^{1} French Land Register data, which excludes lakes, ponds, glaciers > 1 km^{2} (0.386 sq mi or 247 acres) and river estuaries.

Le Vigen (French pronunciation: [lə viʒɑ̃]; Occitan: Lo Vijan) is a commune in the Haute-Vienne department in the Nouvelle-Aquitaine region in west-central France.

== Geography ==
The village lies on the right bank of the Briance, which flows westward through the commune.

== History ==
The village is said to be the place where Saint Thillo (c. 608–702) died. The church of Saint Mathurin was later built over the oratory where the saint died, although no trace of the oratory has survived.

== Points of Interest ==
Parc du Reynou is a 100 hectare zoo based in the commune

== Population ==
Historical population
Year	Pop.	±% p.a.
1968	1,044	—
1975	1,055	+0.15%
1982	1,263	+2.60%
1990	1,550	+2.59%
1999	1,704	+1.06%
2007	2,032	+2.22%
2012	2,051	+0.19%
2017	2,171	+1.14%
2023	2,310	+1.04%
Source: INSEE

== See also ==
- Communes of the Haute-Vienne department
