= Gran conquista de Ultramar =

13th-century Castilian chronicle of the Crusades

Miniature depicting a Christian siege of a Muslim city, from an illuminated manuscript of the Gran conquista (MS Madrid 1187)

The Gran conquista de Ultramar ('Great Conquest Beyond the Sea') is a late 13th-century Castilian chronicle of the Crusades for the period 1095–1271. It is a work of compilation, translation and prosification of Old French and Old Occitan sources, mixing historical material with legends drawn from the epic chansons de geste. It was produced under royal patronage by Sancho IV and probably his father, Alfonso X.

It was translated into Catalan and Galician-Portuguese. It survives in four manuscripts and received its editio princeps (first edition) in 1503.

== Manuscripts and editions ==
Title page of Madrid 2454, with a decorated initial

Although the title Gran conquista de Ultramar ('Great Conquest of Outremer' or 'Great Conquest Beyond the Sea') is conventional, the work also appears in the manuscripts under the titles Grant estoria de Ultramar or Estoria mayor de Ultramar ('Great History of Outremer'). It survives partially in four manuscripts:

- Madrid, BNE ms 1187
- Madrid, BNE ms 1920
- Madrid, BNE ms 2454
- Salamanca, BU ms 1698

The manuscripts are from the 14th and 15th centuries. Madrid 1187 may date to as early as c. 1295. It contains spaces for many miniature illustrations, but only two are completed. Only about 73.5% of the text of the original work can be found across the four manuscripts today. The complete work is, however, preserved in the first printed edition made at Salamanca by Hans Giesser in 1503. Thus, about 26.5% of the work is known exclusively through the 1503 edition. The first critical edition of the whole work, based on the Madrid 1187 manuscript and the Salamanca edition, was made by Pascual de Gayangos in 1858.

A translated epitome of the Gran conquista was incorporated into the Galician-Portuguese Crónica general de 1404, in the section on the reign of Alfonso VI (1065–1109). This is found in a single manuscript:

- New York, Hispanic Society of America ms B2278

The Gran conquista was also translated into Catalan at the instigation of King James II of Aragon (1264–1327).

== Authorship and date ==
The Gran conquista was compiled from Old French and Old Occitan works that were then translated into Castilian. The oldest manuscript (Madrid 1187) contains a colophon naming King Sancho IV of Castile (1284–1295) as the author. Madrid 1698 and the Salamanca edition, however, attribute the work to Sancho's father, Alfonso X (1252–1284). Modern scholars tend to accept the former attribution, arguing that Sancho supervised the selection, translation and editing of materials. It has, however, been argued that the work was begun by Alfonso and completed by Sancho. A notice in Madrid 1920 that Sancho IV ordered the translation of the work "from the conquest of Antioch on" may indicate that the portion of the work ending with the siege of Antioch in 1098 was the work as Alfonso left it at his death, the remainder being added by Sancho.

Alfonso evinced a strong interest in the Crusades to the Holy Land after the loss of Jerusalem (1244) and the council of Lyon (1245). He led a crusade against Salé in Africa in 1260 and intended to heed the call of the council of Lyon (1274). His interest seems to have peaked after the death of Louis IX of France while on crusade in 1270. Cristina González suggests he may have ordered the Gran conquista out of "frustration, nostalgia, and hope". Sancho IV had reasons of his own for the Gran conquista. In 1292, he took the strategic stronghold of Tarifa from the Muslims. The narrative of the rise and fall of a dynasty and of what legitimized its authority may have seemed particularly relevant at the court of Sancho IV.

The Gran conquista attained its finished form in the years 1289–1295.

== Content ==
Miniature depicting a Christian siege of a Muslim city, from Madrid 1187

=== Structure ===
The Gran conquista covers the Crusades and the history of Outremer in the period 1095–1271 after a prologue on the Byzantine emperor Heraclius and the rise of Muḥammad. The last event it covers is the Eighth Crusade. It is designed as a complete history of Outremer to date and, although compiled from various sources, presents a single narrative. It is written in prose, although some of its sources are verse.

The Gran conquista is divided into four books. The first contains 231 chapter, the second 265, the third 395 and the fourth 429, for a total of 1,320 chapters. No surviving manuscript contains more than 561 chapters.

=== Sources ===
The base text is a translation of the Estoire d'Eracles, itself a French translation of William of Tyre's Latin Historia rerum in partibus transmarinis gestarum with a prologue on Heraclius. It brings the history down to 1184 but had many continuations added in the 13th century. The version used for the Gran conquista includes the Chronique d'Ernoul et de Bernard le trésorier, a continuation down to 1229. About 1,100 of the chapters are based primarily on the Estoire.

The Estoire's narrative is embellished by texts from various French epics, the Occitan Canso d'Antioca and unidentified sources. Among the French poems used are Berte aus grans pies, Mainet and set drawn from the so-called Crusade cycle: Naissance du chevalier au cygne, Chevalier au cygne, Enfances Godefroi, Chanson d'Antioche, Chanson des chétifs and Chanson de Jérusalem. About one third of the total work is derived from the Old French epics.

=== Fictional content ===
One of the most distinctive features of the Gran conquista is the incorporation of the fictional Swan Knight into an otherwise historiographical work. There is precedent for this in the incorporation of the tales of Pirus and Bruto in Alfonso X's Estoria de España and General estoria, respectively. Cristina González argues that the Knight is best seen as "a chivalric archetype":

In the Conquista the successes and failures of the Christians in the Holy Land are presented as depending on their following or deviating from the chivalric model offered by the Swan Knight and his grandson, Godfrey of Bouillon. This provides an explanation for their rather depressing defeats and a recipe for much-desired victories at the same time.

The text may thus be described as a "chivalric chronicle" or "romanced chronicle" (crónica novelesca). It served as a model for later chivalric romances, like Amadís de Gaula. The Salamanca edition contained many features typical of printed romances, which misled many scholars into treating the work as primarily a work of fiction.

== Bibliography ==
=== Editions ===
- Carrasco Tenorio, Milagros (2020). La Gran Conquista de Ultramar: Edición crítica y estudio filológico del Ms BNE 1187 (PhD dissertation). University of Lausanne.
- Cooper, Louis, ed. (1979). La Gran Conquista de Ultramar. Vol. 4 vols. Publicaciones del Instituto Caro y Cuervo.
- Cooper, Louis; Waltman, Franklin M., eds. (1989). La Gran Conquista de Ultramar: Biblioteca Nacional MS 1187. Hispanic Seminary of Medieval Studies.
- Echenique Elizondo, María Teresa, ed. (1989). La leyenda del Caballero del Cisne. Aceña.
- Gayangos, Pascual de, ed. (1858). La gran conquista de Ultramar que mandó escribir el rey don Alfonso el Sabio: ilustrada con notas críticas y un glosario. M. Rivadeneyra.
- Harris-Northall, Ray, ed. (1994). Text and Concordances of the "Gran Conquista de Ultramar" (BNM R-518, R-519). Hispanic Seminary of Medieval Studies.
- Querol Sanz, José Manuel, ed. (2014). La leyenda del Caballero del Cisne. Castalia.

=== Secondary literature ===
- Domínguez Prieto, César (2010). "Gran conquista de Ultramar". In R. G. Dunphy (ed.). Encyclopedia of the Medieval Chronicle. Brill. pp. 726–727.
- González, Cristina (2003). "Gran conquista de Ultramar, La". In E. Michael Gerli (ed.). Medieval Iberia: An Encyclopedia. Routledge. pp. 367–368.
- Nepaulsingh, Colbert (1993). "Conquista de Ultramar, Gran". In Germán Bleiberg; Maureen Ihrie; Janet Pérez (eds.). Dictionary of the Literature of the Iberian Peninsula. Vol. 1: A–K. Greenwood Press. pp. 430–431.
- Parsons, Simon Thomas (2019). "The Gran conquista de Ultramar, Its Precursors, and the Lords of Saint-Pol". The Journal of Religious History, Literature and Culture. 5 (2): 101–116. doi:10.16922/jrhlc.5.2.8.
- Schreiner, Elisabeth (2006). "Gran Conquista de Ultramar". In Alan V. Murray (ed.). The Crusades: An Encyclopedia. Vol. 2. ABC-CLIO. pp. 536–537.
