= Gouffier of Lastours =

Knight from Lastours in the Limousin in France

- Born: France
- Died: France
- Resting place: Le Chalard
- Other names: Goufier, Golfier, Gulpher
- Occupation: Lord of Lastours
- Known for: Crusader
- Spouse: Agnes of Aubusson
- Children: Gouffier, Guy, Olivier
- Parent(s): Guy I of Lastours, Agnes of Chambon

Gouffier of Lastours (also Goufier, Golfier, Gulpher) was a knight from Lastours in the Limousin in France, who participated in the First Crusade. He was lord of the Château de Lastours, near Nexon, Haute-Vienne.

== Origins ==
Gouffier's date of birth is unknown. He was the son of Guy I of Lastours and Agnes, sister of the lord of Chambon-Sainte-Valérie. He had two brothers, Guy II and Gerald. Along with his brothers, he donated land to Beaulieu Abbey sometime between 1062 and 1072, in return for masses to be said for their deceased father.

== First Crusade ==
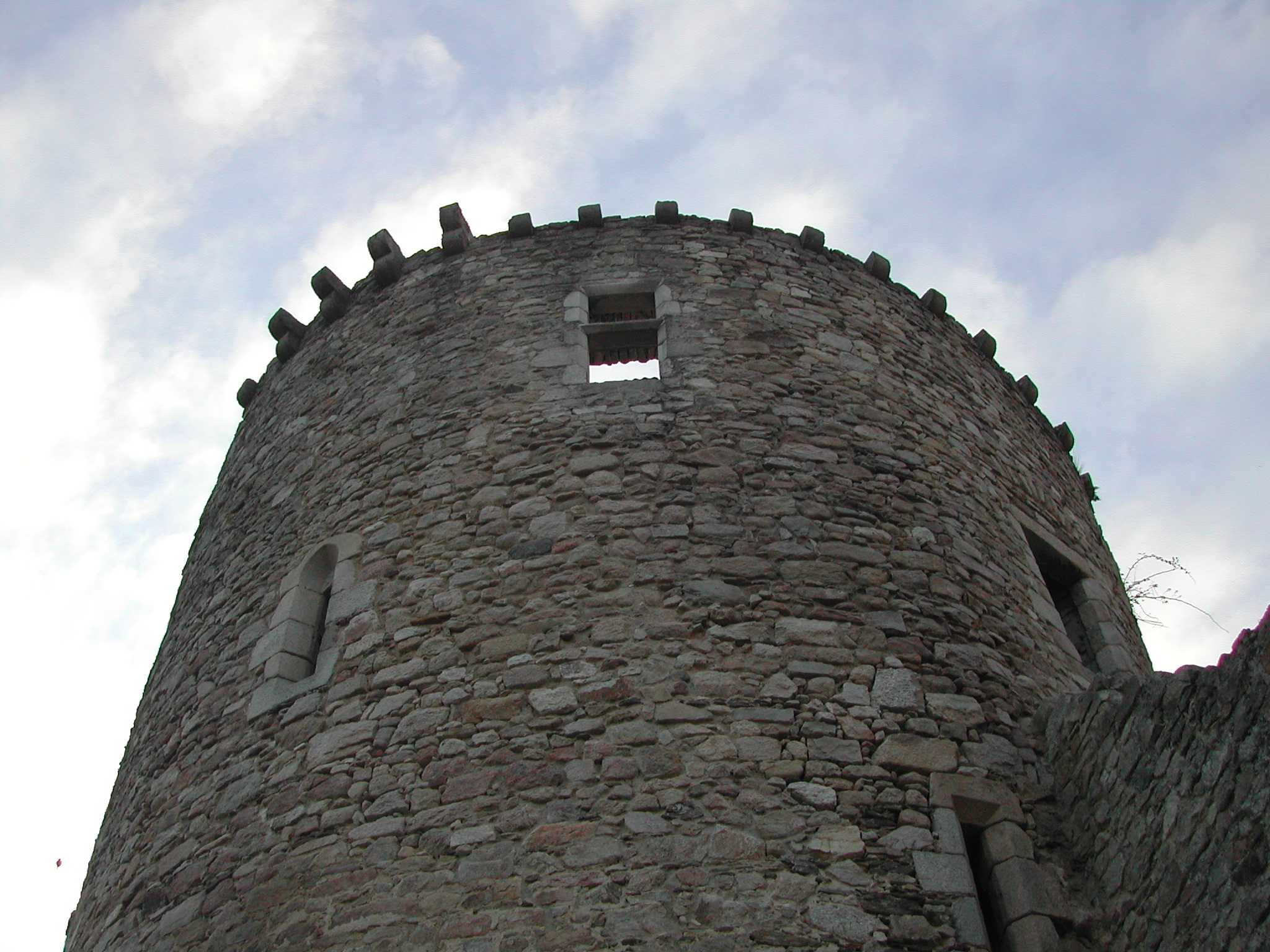
The ruins of the Château de Lastours.

On 23 December 1095 he heard Pope Urban II preach the crusade at Limoges. Gouffier and his brothers joined the crusade, initially travelling in the army of their suzerain, Raymond IV of Toulouse, and of the papal legate Adhemar of Le Puy.

The accounts of Gouffier's actions in the early part of the crusade are somewhat unreliable. He supposedly distinguished himself at the Siege of Nicaea. On the crusaders' subsequent march through Anatolia, the army was split into two. Gouffier was supposedly part of the smaller army that was ambushed at Dorylaeum in July 1097, and was sent to the larger army to request help from Godfrey of Bouillon, who arrived just in time to defeat the Turks. However, it is more likely that Gouffier was already in the larger army, travelling with Godfrey and Raymond.

At the Siege of Antioch, Gouffier was part of the group that blockaded the route out of the city over Mount Silpius. The crusaders also built a bridge of boats over the Orontes River, and Gouffier crossed over it on horseback and killed three Turks who were waiting to ambush the crusaders on the other side. A few days later during another skirmish, he killed an emir and captured his horse. At another skirmish, he saved Raymond of Toulouse by killing fifteen Turks, breaking all of his weapons and shield in the process.

In 1098 the crusaders took Antioch and successfully broke a countersiege by the Turks. After this, Gouffier's deeds are better-recorded in the sources. He helped capture a town referred to as "Talamania", possibly al-Bara, and he was instrumental in the Siege of Ma'arra in December 1098. On the evening of 11 December Gouffier climbed onto the walls of Ma'arra, followed by so many other crusaders that the ladder broke under their weight.

The crusaders arrived at Jerusalem in July 1099, and captured the city on 15 July. Gouffier was with Raymond of Toulouse, who pressed the Muslim defenders back into the Tower of David before they surrendered.

Gouffier then briefly passes back into legend. Supposedly, he saved a lion from the clutches of a snake, and the lion then followed him everywhere, even into battle. When Gouffier departed for Europe by boat, the sailors were afraid of the lion and would not let it on board, so the lion swam after the boat and drowned.

When he returned to Lastours, he donated five Muslim standards to the Abbey of Saint Martial in Limoges. He also donated tapestries to the castle of Arnac-Pompadour. His brother Guy had died on the crusade, but in 1114, Gouffier and his other brother Gerard donated land to Gerald of Sales to found the Abbey of Dolon. The last mention of Gouffier is around 1126, when he is recorded as castellan of Hautefort. The date of his death is unknown, but he was buried at Le Chalard.

Supposedly he also intervened on behalf of an unnamed queen of France, who had been accused of adultery. Gouffier defeated her accuser in a duel, and was then allowed to add the fleur de lis, the symbol of French royalty, to his own coat of arms.

== Family ==
Gouffier was married to Agnes, daughter of Ranulf of Aubusson. Her dowry was the castle of Gimel. They had three children, Gouffier, Olivier, and Guy. Guy died in Jerusalem during the Second Crusade. Olivier had a daughter, Agnes, who was married to Constantine, the brother of the troubadour Bertran de Born.

== Legacy ==
Although he was a relatively minor noble, Gouffier was a local celebrity in the Limousin thanks to his participation in the crusade. From the period following the Siege of Antioch to the crusaders' arrival at Jerusalem, he is mentioned in the eyewitness accounts of Raymond of Aguilers, Peter Tudebode, and the author of the Gesta Francorum (who had been following Bohemond of Taranto but joined Raymond of Toulouse after Antioch).

His earlier exploits are less certain. Evidently there was an Occitan poem about Gouffier, the Canso d'Antioca, written by Gregory Bechada. Gouffier was Bechada's patron, and Bechada presumably heard about the crusade from Gouffier himself and others who were there, but his work survives only in fragments. It was, however, an influence on the Castilian Gran Conquista de Ultramar, which records Gouffier's deeds at Nicaea, Dorylaeum, and Antioch. It also influenced the troubadour Uc de Pena, who mentions Gouffier's role as a messenger at Dorylaeum.

The legends of the lion and of the queen of France must have developed after Bechada wrote his poem. The legend of the queen of France is very late, dating from the sixteenth century. The lion story first appears in a note appended to the end of the chronicle of Geoffrey of Vigeois, probably added around 1200. The story strongly resembles Yvain, the Knight of the Lion by Chrétien de Troyes.

== Sources ==
- François Arbellot, "Les chevaliers limousins à la première croisade (1096-1102)". Bulletin de la Société archéologique et historique du Limousin 29 (1881), pp. 5–72.
- Claude Bernard, "Un Chevalier limousin: Goufier de Lastours", Bulletin de la Société archéologique et historique du Limousin 86 (1955), pp. 23–33.
- Marcus Bull, Knightly Piety and the Lay Response to the First Crusade: The Limousin and Gascony, c. 970-1130. Oxford, 1993.
- Carol Sweetenham and Linda M. Paterson, The Canso d'Antioca: An Occitan Epic Chronicle of the First Crusade. Ashgate, 2003.
