= Crusade Texts in Translation =

Book series of English translations of texts contemporary to the Crusades

Crusade Texts in Translation is a book series of English translations of texts about the Crusades published initially by Ashgate in Farnham, Surrey and Burlington, Vermont, and currently by Routledge. Publication began in May 1996. The editors of the series, all from the United Kingdom, are Malcolm Barber, University of Reading; Peter Edbury, Cardiff University; Bernard Hamilton, University of Nottingham; Norman Housley, University of Leicester; and Peter Jackson, University of Keele.

It contains a large corpus of texts concerning the history of the Crusades and the Crusader states. Many of the texts have not been translated into English before.

== Books ==
1. The Conquest of Jerusalem and the Third Crusade: Sources in Translation. Translated by Peter W. Edbury. Ashgate, Aldershot, 1998, ISBN 1-84014-676-1.
2. William of Tudela and an anonymous Successor: The Song of the Cathar Wars. A History of the Albigensian Crusade. Translated by Janet Shirley. Ashgate, Aldershot, 2000, ISBN 0-7546-0388-1.
3. Helen J. Nicholson: Chronicle of the Third Crusade. A Translation of the Itinerarium Peregrinorum et Gesta Regis Ricardi. Ashgate, Aldershot, 1997, ISBN 1-85928-154-0.
4. Walter the Chancellor's The Antiochene Wars. A Translation and Commentary. A Translation and Commentary by Thomas S. Asbridge and Susan B. Edgington. Ashgate, Aldershot, 1999, ISBN 1-84014-263-4.
5. Crusader Syria in the Thirteenth Century. The Rothelin Continuation of the History of William of Tyre with Part of the Eracles or Acre Text. Translated by Janet Shirley. Ashgate, Aldershot, 1999, ISBN 1-84014-606-0 (also wrongly numbered as 4 in the series).
6. Paul Crawford: The "Templar of Tyre". Part III of the "Deeds of the Cypriots". Ashgate, Aldershot, 2001, ISBN 1-84014-618-4.
7. Bahāʾ al- Dīn Yūsuf ibn Rāfiʿ Ibn Shaddād: The rare and excellent History of Saladin or al-Nawādir al-Sultaniyya wa'l-Mahasin al-Yusufiyya. Translated by Donald S. Richards. Ashgate, Aldershot, 2001, ISBN 0-7546-0143-9.
8. Guillaume de Machaut: The Capture of Alexandria. Translated by Janet Shirley. Introduction and Notes by Peter W. Edbury. Ashgate, Aldershot, 2001, ISBN 0-7546-0101-3.
9. Thomas A. Fudge: The Crusade against Heretics in Bohemia, 1418–1437. Sources and Documents for the Hussite Crusades. Ashgate, Aldershot, 2002, ISBN 0-7546-0801-8.
10. The Book of Deeds of James I of Aragon. A Translation of the Medieval Catalan Llibre dels Fets by Damian J. Smith and Helena Buffery. Ashgate, Aldershot, 2003, ISBN 0-7546-0359-8.
11. Robert the Monk's History of the First Crusade. = Historia Iherosolimitana. Translated by Carol Sweetenham. Ashgate, Aldershot, 2005, ISBN 0-7546-0471-3.
12. The Gesta Tancredi of Ralph of Caen. A History of the Normans on the First Crusade. Translated by Bernard S. Bachrach and David S. Bachrach. Ashgate, Burlington VT, 2005, ISBN 0-7546-3710-7.
13. The chronicle of Ibn al-Athīr for the crusading period from al-Kāmil fīʾl-taʾrīkh. Pt. 1: The Years 491–541/1097–1146. The Coming of the Franks and the Muslim Response. Translated by Donald S. Richards. Ashgate, Aldershot, 2006, ISBN 0-7546-4077-9.
14. Colin Imber: The Crusade of Varna, 1443–45. Ashgate, Aldershot, 2006, ISBN 0-7546-0144-7.
15. The chronicle of Ibn al-Athīr for the crusading period from al-Kāmil fīʾl-taʾrīkh. Pt. 2: The Years 541–589/1146–1146. The Age of Nur al-Din and Saladin. Translated by Donald S. Richards. Ashgate, Aldershot, 2007, ISBN 978-0-7546-4078-3.
16. Peter Jackson: The Seventh Crusade, 1244–1254. Sources and Documents. Ashgate, Farnham, 2007, ISBN 978-0-7546-5722-4.
17. The chronicle of Ibn al-Athīr for the crusading period from al-Kāmil fīʾl-taʾrīkh. Pt. 3: The Years 589–629/1193–1231. The Ayyūbids after Saladin and the Mongol Menace. Translated by Donald S. Richards. Ashgate, Aldershot, 2008, ISBN 978-0-7546-4079-0.
18. Letters from the East. Crusaders, Pilgrims and Settlers in the 12th – 13th centuries. Translated by Malcolm Barber and Keith Bate. Ashgate, Farnham, 2010, ISBN 978-0-7546-6356-0.
19. The Crusade of Frederick Barbarossa. The History of the Expedition of the Emperor Frederick and Related Texts. Translated by Graham A. Loud. Ashgate, Farnham, 2010, ISBN 978-0-7546-6575-5.
20. Nicolaus von Jeroschin: The Chronicle of Prussia. A History of the Teutonic Knights in Prussia, 1190–1331. Translated by Mary Fischer. Ashgate, Farnham, 2010, ISBN 978-0-7546-5309-7.
21. Marino Sanudo Torsello: The Book of the Secrets of the Faithful of the Cross. = Liber Secretorum Fidelium Crucis Translated by Peter Lock. Ashgate, Farnham, 2011, ISBN 978-0-7546-3059-3.
22. The Chanson d'Antioche. An Old French Account of the First Crusade. Translated by Susan B. Edgington and Carol Sweetenham. Ashgate, Farnham, 2011, ISBN 978-0-7546-5489-6.
23. Denys Pringle: Pilgrimage to Jerusalem and the Holy Land, 1187–1291. Ashgate, Farnham, 2012, ISBN 978-0-7546-5125-3.
24. Albert of Aachen's History of the Journey to Jerusalem. Band 1: Books 1–6. The First Crusade, 1095–1099. Translated and edited by Susan B. Edgington. Ashgate, Farnham, 2013, ISBN 978-1-4094-6652-9.
25. Albert of Aachen's History of the Journey to Jerusalem. Band 2: Books 7–12. The Early History of the Latin States, 1099–1119. Translated and edited by Susan B. Edgington. Ashgate, Farnham, 2013, ISBN 978-1-4094-6653-6.
26. Caffaro, Genoa and the Twelfth-Century Crusades. Translated by Martin Hall and Jonathan Phillips. Ashgate, Farnham, 2013, ISBN 978-1-4094-2860-2.
27. Prester John. The Legend and its Sources. Compiled and Translated by Keagan Brewer. Ashgate, Farnham, 2015, ISBN 978-1-4094-3807-6.
28. The Old French Chronicle of Morea: An Account of Frankish Greece after the Fourth Crusade. Edited by Anne Van Arsdall and Helen Moody. Routledge, 2017, ISBN 978-1-1383-0722-3.
29. The Chanson des Chétifs and Chanson de Jérusalem: Completing the Central Trilogy of the Old French Crusade Cycle. Translated by Carol Sweetenham. Routledge, 2016, ISBN 978-1-1383-0724-7.
30. The Conquest of the Holy Land by Ṣalāḥ al-Dīn: A critical edition and translation of the anonymous Libellus de expugnatione Terrae Sanctae per Saladinum. Translated by Keagan Brewer and James Kane. Routledge, 2019, ISBN 978-0-3677-2975-2
31. Chronicles of Qalāwūn and his son al-Ashraf Khalīl. Translated by David Cook. Routledge, 2020, ISBN 978-1-1383-6832-3.
32. Baybars’ Successors: Ibn al-Furāt on Qalāwūn and al-Ashraf. Translated by David Cook. Routledge, 2020, ISBN 978-0-3672-2397-7.
33. The Chronicle of Arnold of Lübeck. Translated by Graham Loud. Routledge, 2020, ISBN 978-0-3676-6045-1.
34. Ibn Naẓīf’s World-History: Al-Tā’rīkh al-Manṣūrī. Translated by David Cook. Routledge, 2021, ISBN 978-0-3676-2355-5
35. The Conquest of Santarém and Goswin’s Song of the Conquest of Alcácer do Sal. Editions and Translations of De expugnatione Scalabis and Gosuini de expugnatione Salaciae carmen. Translated by Jonathan Wilson. Routledge, 2021, ISBN 978-0-3677-5381-8
36. History of the Dukes of Normandy and the Kings of England by the Anonymous of Béthune. Edited By Paul Webster. Routledge, 2021, ISBN 978-1-1387-4349-6.
37. The Road to Antioch and Jerusalem: The Crusader Pilgrimage of the Monte Cassino Chronicle. Translated by Francesca Petrizzo. Routledge, 2024, ISBN 978-0-3672-6016-3.
38. On Warfare and the Threefold Path of the Jerusalem Pilgrimage: A Translation of Ralph Niger’s De re militari et triplici via peregrinationis Ierosolimitane. Translated by John Cotts. Routledge, 2024, ISBN 978-1-0322-3497-7
39. The Latin Continuation of William of Tyre. Edited and translated by James H. Kane and Keagan J. Brewer. Routledge, 2024, ISBN 978-0-3674-8965-6
40. Byzantine Sources for the Crusades, 1095-1204. Edited by Georgios Chatzelis and Jonathan Harris. Routledge, 2024, ISBN 978-0-3678-5840-7
41. The Book of Raymond of Aguilers: Historia Francorum qui Ceperunt Iherusalem. Translated by James Currie. Routledge, 2025, ISBN 978-1-0323-2570-5
42. The Swan Knight Texts of the Old French Crusade Cycle. Edited and translated by Carol Sweetenham. Routledge, 2025, ISBN 978-0-3671-3645-1
43. Early Western Missions to the Mongols (1245–1248): The Opening of Diplomatic Contacts with a New World Power. Edited by Peter Jackson. Routledge, 2026, ISBN 978-1-0328-3974-5
44. The Life of Peter Thomas by Philippe de Mézières: A Translation of the Vita Sancti Petri Thomae and Other Material. Edited by Timothy Owens. Routledge, 2026, ISBN 978-1-0322-2840-2
45. A Lamentable and Consolatory Epistle, 1397: A Translation of Philippe de Mézières’ Une Epistre Lamentable et Consolatoire adressé à Philippe le Hardi, duc de Bourgogne, sur la défaite de Nicopolis. Edited by Zeynep Kocabıyıkoğlu Çeçen. Routledge, 2027, ISBN 978-1-0328-4106-9
