= Song of Antioch =

Song of Antioch may refer to:

- Canso d'Antioca, Old Occitan crusade song
- Chanson d'Antioche, Old French crusade song
