= Uc de Pena =

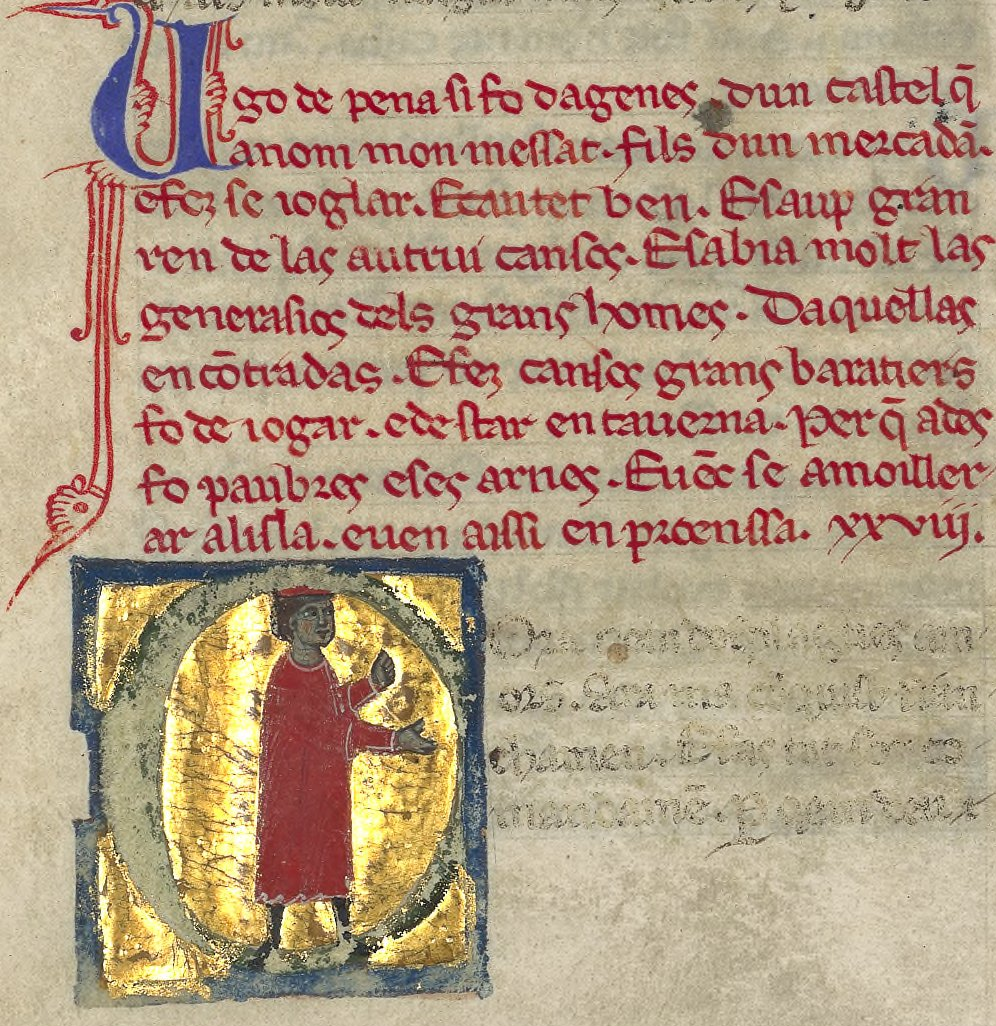
Uc's vida is the red text above his picture.

Uc, Uco, or Ugo de Pena or Penna was a troubadour of the late 12th and early 13th centuries. He left behind three cansos and no music.

His origins are found in Penne-d'Agenais, in the Agenais. According to his vida his birthplace was a castle called "Messat" or "Monmessat". He was the son of a merchant, who first became a jongleur and then grew renowned for his singing and for his expansive repertoire (of the works of others). He was also reputed for his knowledge of the "great men of those regions", but he was known for his roguish style of living—gambling and frequenting taverns—for which reason, says his biographer, "he was always poor and without equipment." Eventually he travelled east to "Isla é(n) Venaissi" (probably Isle-sur-Sorgue in Provence), where he married.

In one song, Uc refers to the Occitan knight Gouffier de Lastours, who carried a message from Bohemond of Taranto to Godfrey of Bouillon at the critical Battle of Dorylaeum on the First Crusade. This event had probably become an important piece of Occitan crusading lore and is recorded also in the Canso d'Antioca and the Gran Conquista de Ultramar.

Among his other works is Quora que'm desplagués Amors.

== Sources ==
- Egan, Margarita, ed. and trans. The Vidas of the Troubadours. New York: Garland, 1984. ISBN 0-8240-9437-9.
- Sweetenham, Carol, and Paterson, Linda M., edd. and trans. The "Canso d'Antiocha": An Epic Chronicle of the First Crusade. Aldershot and Burlington: Ashgate Publishing, 2003. Preview. ISBN 0-7546-0410-1.
- Rochegude, Henri Pascal de. Le Parnasse occitanien, ou Choix de poésies originales des troubadours. Benichet, 1819. See page 325 for the original Occitan version of Uc's vida.
