= Ashgate Publishing =

1967–2015 British academic publisher

- Founded: 1967
- Defunct: July 2015
- Successor: Informa (Taylor & Francis)
- Country of origin: United Kingdom
- Headquarters location: Farnham
- Publication types: Books, academic journals
- Imprints: Gower Publishing, Lund Humphries
- Official website: ashgate.com

Ashgate Publishing was an academic book and journal publisher based in Farnham (Surrey, United Kingdom). It was established in 1967 and specialised in the social sciences, arts, humanities and professional practice. The publisher had an American office in Burlington, Vermont, and another office in London. It is now a subsidiary of Informa (Taylor & Francis).

The company had several imprints including Gower Publishing which published professional business and management titles; Lund Humphries, originally established in 1939, which published illustrated art books, particularly in the field of modern British art; and Dartmouth. In March 2015, Gower unveiled GpmFirst, a web-based community of practice allowing subscribers access to more than 120 project management titles, as well as discussions and articles relevant to business and project management.

In July 2015, it was announced that Ashgate had been sold to Informa for a reported £20M, and Lund Humphries was relaunched as an independent publisher in December 2015. By February 2016, the independent imprints of Ashgate became part of the Routledge imprint.

== Book series ==
- Anglo-Italian Renaissance Studies Series
- Anthropology and Cultural History in Asia and the Indo-Pacific
- The Archbishops of Canterbury Series
- Ashgate Critical Essays on Women Writers in England, 1550-1700
- Ashgate Economic Geography Series
- Ashgate Inform Series on Minority Religions and Spiritual Movements
- Ashgate New Critical Thinking in Religion, Theology and Biblical Studies Series
- Ashgate Popular and Folk Music Series
- Ashgate Science and Religion Series
- Ashgate Series in Nineteenth-Century Transatlantic Studies
- Ashgate Studies in Applied Ethics
- Ashgate Studies in Architecture Series
- Ashgate Studies in First World War History
- Ashgate Studies in Medieval Philosophy
- Ashgate Studies in Publishing History: Manuscript, Print, Digital
- Ashgate Studies in the History of Philosophical Theology
- Ashgate Studies in Theology, Imagination and the Arts Series
- Ashgate World Philosophies Series
- Ashgate World Philosophical Series
- Avebury Series in Philosophy
- British Literature in Context in the Long Eighteenth Century
- Bruton Center for Development Studies Series
- Catholic Christendom 1300-1700 Series
- Chinese Economy Series
- The Chinese Trade and Industry Series
- Church, Faith and Culture in the Medieval West
- Collected Studies Series
- Contemporary Ecclesiology Series
- Corbett Centre for Maritime Policy Studies Series
- Critical Security Series
- Crusade Texts in Translation
- Design and the Built Environment
- The Early Modern Englishwoman: A Facsimile Library of Essential Works
- Edinburgh Centre for Law and Society Series
- An Expanding World: The European Impact on World History, 1450-1800
- Explorations in Practical, Pastoral and Empirical Theology
- Ethics and Global Politics
- The Formation of the Classical Islamic World
- Global Finance Series
- Global Interdisciplinary Studies Series
- The Hakluyt Society Series
- Heritage, Culture and Identity Series
- Historical Urban Studies Series
- The Histories of Material Culture and Collecting, 1700-1950
- The History of Medicine in Context
- The History of Policing
- Human Factors in Road and Rail Transport Series
- Intensities: Contemporary Continental Philosophy of Religion
- Interdisciplinary Research Series in Ethnic, Gender and Class Relations
- The International Political Economy of New Regionalisms Series
- International Land Management Series
- International Library of Essays in the History of Social and Political Thought
- The International Library of Essays on Military History
- The International Library of Politics and Comparative Government Series
- The Law, Family and Society
- Law, Justice and Power Series
- Law, Property and Society
- A Library of Essays on Renaissance Music
- Literary and Scientific Cultures of Early Modernity
- Liturgy, Worship and Society Series
- The Making of Modern Africa
- Markets and the Law series
- Medicine in the Medieval Mediterranean
- Modern Economic and Social History Series
- Monitoring Change in Education
- Music and Material Culture Series
- The Nineteenth Century
- Non-State Actors in International Law, Politics and Governance Series
- The Pacific World: Lands, Peoples and History of the Pacific, 1500-1900
- Policy Studies Organization Series
- Politics and Culture in Europe, 1650-1750
- Post-Soviet Politics Series
- Publications of the Navy Records Society
- Research in Migration and Ethnic Relations Series
- Rethinking Classical Sociology
- Science, Technology and Culture, 1700-1945
- SOAS Musicology Series
- Socio-legal Studies Series
- St. Andrews Studies in Reformation History
- Studies in Cash & Care
- Studies in Early Modern English Literature
- Studies in European Cultural Transition
- Studies in Labour History
- Studies in Performance and Early Modern Drama
- Subject/Object: New Studies in Sculpture
- Theology and Religion Interdisciplinary Perspective Series
- Transcending Boundaries in Philosophy and Theology
- Transculturalisms 1400-1700
- Urban and Regional Planning and Development Series
- The University Wits
- Variorum Collected Studies Series
- Vitality of Indigenous Religions Series
- Women and Gender in the Early Modern World
