= Glandon =

- Commune
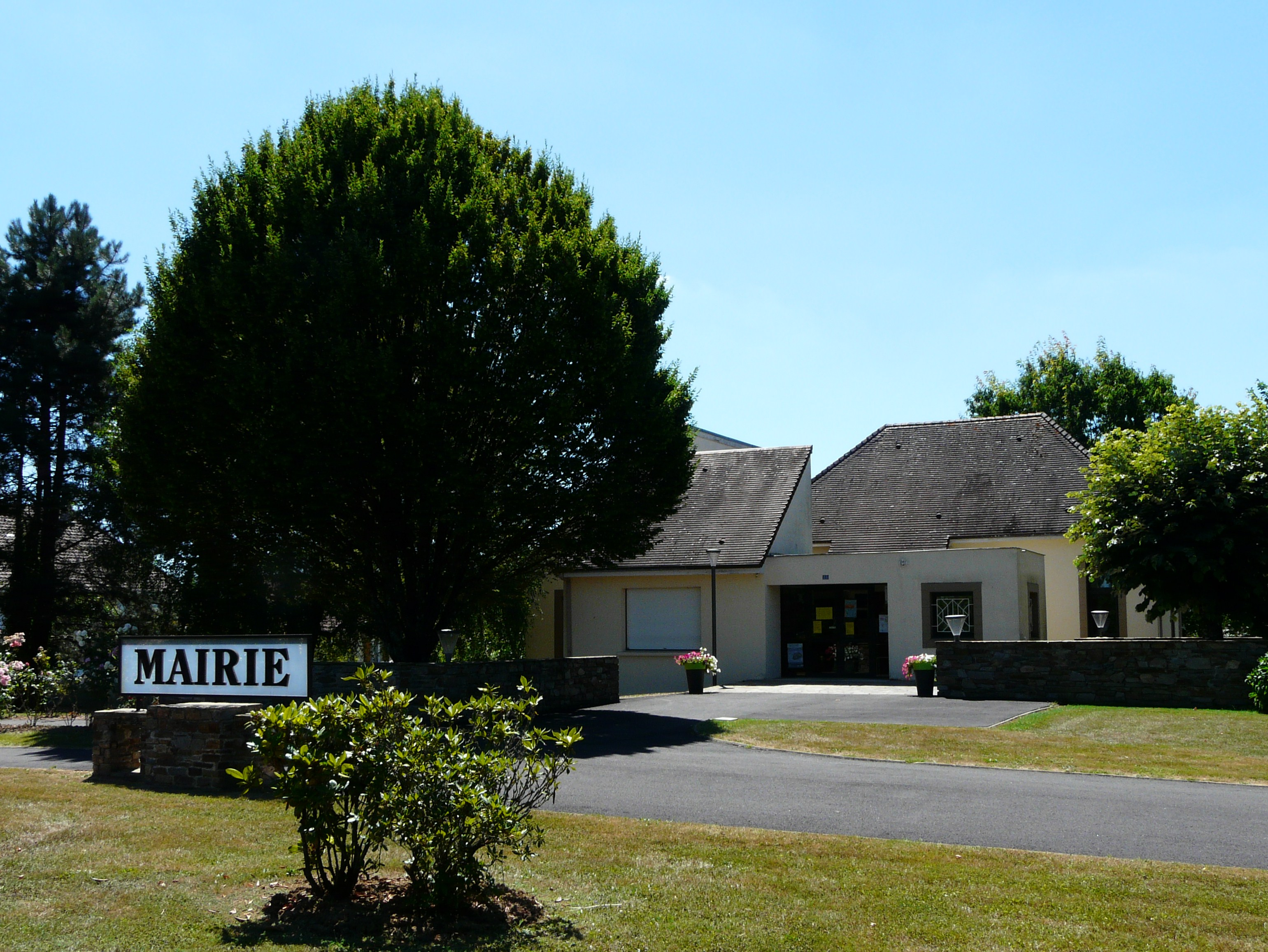
- Town hall

- Coat of arms
- Location of Glandon
- Location within France Location within Nouvelle-Aquitaine
- Coordinates: 45°28′45″N 1°13′41″E
- Country: France
- Region: Nouvelle-Aquitaine
- Department: Haute-Vienne
- Arrondissement: Limoges
- Canton: Saint-Yrieix-la-Perche
- Intercommunality: Pays de Saint-Yrieix

Government
  - Mayor (2020–2026): François Boisserie
- Area^{1}: 27.47 km^{2} (10.61 sq mi)
- Highest elevation: 422 m (1,385 ft)
- Lowest elevation: 262 m (860 ft)
- Population (2023): 810
  - Density: 29/km^{2} (76/sq mi)
- Time zone: UTC+01:00 (CET)
  - Summer (DST): UTC+02:00 (CEST)
- INSEE/Postal code: 87071 /87500
- ^{1} French Land Register data, which excludes lakes, ponds, glaciers > 1 km^{2} (0.386 sq mi or 247 acres) and river estuaries.

Glandon (French pronunciation: [ɡlɑ̃dɔ̃]; Occitan: Glandon) is a commune in the Haute-Vienne department in the Nouvelle-Aquitaine region in west-central France.

Inhabitants are known as Glandonais.

== Geography ==
Glandon lies Southeast of Périgord-Limousin National Regional Park and South of Saint-Yrieix-la-Perche, another French commune. Two rivers cross the Glandon: the Boucheuse river and the Mud river.

== See also ==
- Communes of the Haute-Vienne department
