= Chanson des chétifs =

Old French epic poem based on the First Crusade

The Chanson des Chétifs ("song of the captives") is an Old French chanson de geste falling about halfway through the Old French Crusade Cycle (a series of narrative poems about the First Crusade). It is an intermediary branch bridging the Chanson d'Antioche and the Chanson de Jérusalem in the central trilogy of the cycle. The Chanson des Chétifs takes its name from the fact that its protagonists are "knights taken prisoner at the start of the Crusade at Civetot in the disastrous defeat of Peter the Hermit's army".

The trilogy recounts the First Crusaders' conquests of Antioch and Jerusalem and it forms the core of the Cycle; other branches were added to the Cycle after the trilogy had been composed. The Chanson d'Antioche culminates in the Crusaders' capture of Antioch and the Chanson de Jérusalem recounts the Crusaders' siege and capture of Jerusalem and the Battle of Ascalon that follows. The Chanson des Chétifs is a shorter text, a fantastical interlude between the two longer branches on either side of it. It follows the group of Christian captives as they encounter many adventures on their way to Jerusalem. They are accompanied by the Muslim Corbaran who is based on the historical figure Kerbogha. Corbaran will eventually convert to Christianity in a later branch in the Cycle (the Chrétienté Corbaran). The Chanson des Chétifs depicts Corbaran's growing faith in Christianity and by the end of the text, he is on 'the verge of baptism'.

== Date and historicity ==
Unlike some parts of the Crusade Cycle, the Chanson des Chétifs has no basis in historical reality. It survives largely in thirteenth-century manuscripts; according to Carol Sweetenham, "there are no precise indications for dating either the Chétifs or the Jérusalem, but given the manuscript tradition an assumption of early thirteenth century would not be too wide of the mark for either". That said, the text itself attributes the Sathanas episode of the chanson to a commission by Raymond of Poitiers, the ruler of Antioch, datable to the period 1136–1149, which may indeed reflect the oral or written origin-point for that episode.

== Variations Between the Manuscripts ==
The Chanson des Chétifs survives in ten manuscripts. There are differences between the versions of the text across the manuscripts both in terms of length and content. The shortest version consists of 3,900 lines (which is found in MS. E (Paris BnF fr. 12569)) and the longest version consists of 5,444 lines (found in MS. B (Paris BnF fr. 786)).

All the manuscripts contain three core episodes. These are: the judicial duel, the Sathanas episode and the Harpin de Bourges episode. Two manuscripts (MS. B and MS. I (London, British Library, Additional MS 36615)) contain an additional episode known as the 'Sathanas' mère' digression which is inserted after the Sathanas episode. MS Paris BnF fr. 786 also contains another additional episode known as the 'Cainan' episode which is inserted after the judicial duel episode and is not found in any other manuscript of the Chanson des Chétifs.

== Summary ==
The following summary is based on that by Carol Sweetenham.

=== Laisses 1–8: prologue ===
Following the defeat of the Turkish army by the Crusaders at Antioch, the Turks' general Corbaran of Oliferne returns to Sarmasane, where the Sultan of Persia holds court. The Sultan accuses Corbaran of treachery on account of the Sultan's son Brohadas dying in battle while under Corbaran's protection. Corbaran, amongst others, pleads his case with the Sultan.

=== Laisses 9–51: judicial duel(s) ===
The Sultan concludes that Corbaran's guilt should be tried by judicial combat, stipulating that Corbaran must find a Christian champion to prove his innocence by defeating two Turkish champions (later named as Sorgalé and Golias).

Corbaran's mother Calabra recommends a Christian prisoner (chétif) held in Oliferne: Richard of Chaumont. Richard strikes a bargain: he will fight on Corbaran's behalf if the prisoners are all freed. According to Sweetenham, "an extra two laisses describing Calabra’s divination with a magic cloth are inserted after laisse 24 in most manuscripts"). Corbaran brings Richard and the freed prisoners to Sarmasane, where Richard kills the Turkish champions and the Sultan recognises Corbaran's innocence.

However, Lyon of the Mountain (one of Sorgalé’s relatives) and Arfulan (one of Golias's sons) seek to avenge Sorgalé's death: Lyon leads an ambush of Corbaran; Arfulan attempts to kill him during a banquet. At this point, following laisse 40, manuscript B uniquely includes a further episode, in which a Breton knight named Cainan again accuses Corbaran of betraying the Sultan; this time Corbaran's champion is Harpin of Bourges, who dispatches Corbaran's accuser.

In all manuscripts, after Lyon and Arfulan's attempts at vengeance fail, the two team up to ambush Corbaran. A prophetic dream warns Corbaran of the threat, and he and his men defeat the would-be ambushing forces.

=== Laisses 52–103: defeating Sathanas (and his mother) ===
Corbaran sets out from Sarmasane with the former prisoners to return to Oliferne. Yet a storm descends and they lose their way, thus coming to the dangerous Mount Tigris, which is inhabited by a monstrous serpent named Sathanas.

Mount Tigris lies in the realm of one Abraham, an under-king of the Sultan. The text later explains that Abraham has asked the Sultan to help him defeat Sathanas, but in the meantime Abraham must send his annual tribute to the Sultan via Mount Tigris. He convinces one of his own Christian captives, Ernoul, to undertake this perilous mission. As it happens, Sathanas attacks Ernoul and eats him just when Corbaran's company is passing nearby. One of the former prisoners with Corbaran, Baldwin of Beauvais, is Ernoul's brother; recognising his brother's screams, Baldwin ascends the mountain to seek vengeance. Aided by a holy talisman, he slays Sathanas and exorcises a demon that had possessed him.

Trusting in Baldwin's prowess, the ex-prisoners ascend the mountain, followed by a sceptical Corbaran, are reunited with Baldwin, and find Sathanas's treasure-hoard.

At this point in manuscripts B and I, Corbaran and his companions encounter Sathanas's monstrous and vengeful mother, but survive.

In all manuscripts, the Sultan now arrives with his army to defeat Sathanas, and greets Corbaran with joy. Corbaran at last proceeds home to Oliferne, while the Sultan returns to his court.

=== Laisses 104–28: Corbaran's nephew ===
Harpin, one of the former prisoners, witnesses a wolf seize Corbaran's nephew. Harpin pursues the wolf. The boy is taken from the wolf by a large monkey, who carries him up a tree. While waiting to rescue the boy, Harpin defeats four lions; the monkey accidentally drops the boy, and Harpin saves him. However, the two are now attacked by robbers who are enemies of Corbaran. Luckily, at this moment, Corbaran arrives, led there by the saints Domitian, George and Barbara in the form of white harts. Corbaran makes peace with the robbers.

=== Laisses 129–39: epilogue ===
The former prisoners take their leave of Corbaran and Calabra and proceed on their journey to Jerusalem to rejoin the Crusade, defeating a force of Turks on the way. The one Turkish survivor warns the king of Jerusalem of their approach, and the king readies his forces for battle.

== Influence ==
The Chanson was one of many French sources for the late thirteenth-century Castilian Crusade chronicle Gran conquista de Ultramar ("great conquest beyond the sea").

== Editions and translations ==
- Les Chétifs, ed. by Geoffrey M. Myers, The Old French Crusade Cycle, 5 (University of Alabama Press, 1981), ISBN 0817300236
- The Chanson des Chétifs and Chanson de Jérusalem: Completing the Central Trilogy of the Old French Crusade Cycle, trans. by Carol Sweetenham, Crusade Texts in Translation, 27 (Ashgate, 2016) [repr. Boca Raton, FL: CRC Press, 2018, ISBN 9781138307247; repr. Taylor & Francis, 2020, ISBN 9781317038733).
