= La Roche-l'Abeille =

- Commune
- Coat of arms
- Location of La Roche-l'Abeille
- Location within France Location within Nouvelle-Aquitaine
- Coordinates: 45°35′49″N 1°14′32″E
- Country: France
- Region: Nouvelle-Aquitaine
- Department: Haute-Vienne
- Arrondissement: Limoges
- Canton: Saint-Yrieix-la-Perche
- Intercommunality: Pays de Saint-Yrieix

Government
  - Mayor (2020–2026): Jean-Claude Frachet
- Area^{1}: 36.56 km^{2} (14.12 sq mi)
- Highest elevation: 505 m (1,657 ft)
- Lowest elevation: 323 m (1,060 ft)
- Population (2023): 590
  - Density: 16/km^{2} (42/sq mi)
- Time zone: UTC+01:00 (CET)
  - Summer (DST): UTC+02:00 (CEST)
- INSEE/Postal code: 87127 /87800
- ^{1} French Land Register data, which excludes lakes, ponds, glaciers > 1 km^{2} (0.386 sq mi or 247 acres) and river estuaries.

La Roche-l'Abeille (French pronunciation: [la ʁɔʃ labɛj]; Occitan: La Ròcha l'Abelha) is a commune in the Haute-Vienne department in the Nouvelle-Aquitaine region in west-central France.

Inhabitants are known as Rouchauds in French.

== See also ==
- Communes of the Haute-Vienne department
