= Les Charreaux =

Coordinates: 45°15′24″N 1°6′4″E

Les Charreaux (French pronunciation: [le ʃaʁo]) is a small provincial village in the Dordogne region in France, administratively depending on the commune of Hautefort. The closest towns are Périgueux and Brive-la-Gaillarde.

The village's most notable feature is the large château, the Château des Charreaux (Tour des Charreaux).
