= Janailhac =

- Commune
- Location of Janailhac
- Location within France Location within Nouvelle-Aquitaine
- Coordinates: 45°38′16″N 1°14′31″E
- Country: France
- Region: Nouvelle-Aquitaine
- Department: Haute-Vienne
- Arrondissement: Limoges
- Canton: Saint-Yrieix-la-Perche

Government
  - Mayor (2020–2026): Philippe Devarissias
- Area^{1}: 18.73 km^{2} (7.23 sq mi)
- Highest elevation: 420 m (1,380 ft)
- Lowest elevation: 296 m (971 ft)
- Population (2023): 524
  - Density: 28.0/km^{2} (72.5/sq mi)
- Time zone: UTC+01:00 (CET)
  - Summer (DST): UTC+02:00 (CEST)
- INSEE/Postal code: 87077 /87800
- ^{1} French Land Register data, which excludes lakes, ponds, glaciers > 1 km^{2} (0.386 sq mi or 247 acres) and river estuaries.

Janailhac (French pronunciation: [ʒanajak]; Occitan: Janalhac) is a commune in the Haute-Vienne department in the Nouvelle-Aquitaine region in west-central France.

Inhabitants are known as Janailhacois in French.

== See also ==
- Communes of the Haute-Vienne department
