= Ladignac-le-Long =

- Commune
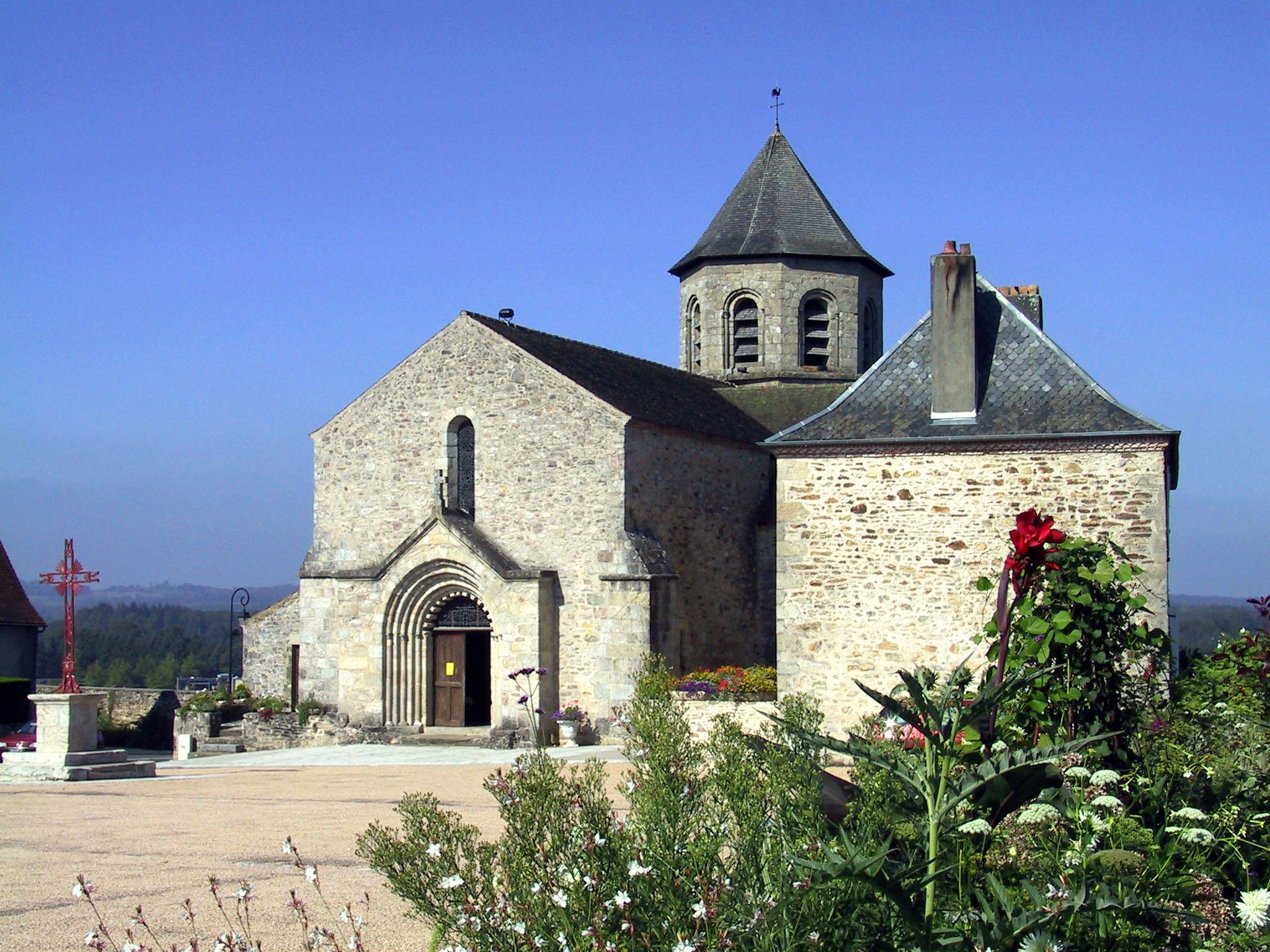
- The church of Saint-Aignan, in Ladignac-le-Long

- Coat of arms
- Location of Ladignac-le-Long
- Location within France Location within Nouvelle-Aquitaine
- Coordinates: 45°35′00″N 1°06′52″E
- Country: France
- Region: Nouvelle-Aquitaine
- Department: Haute-Vienne
- Arrondissement: Limoges
- Canton: Saint-Yrieix-la-Perche
- Intercommunality: Pays de Saint-Yrieix

Government
  - Mayor (2020–2026): Pierre Millet-Lacombe
- Area^{1}: 47.21 km^{2} (18.23 sq mi)
- Highest elevation: 430 m (1,410 ft)
- Lowest elevation: 240 m (790 ft)
- Population (2023): 1,171
  - Density: 24.80/km^{2} (64.24/sq mi)
- Time zone: UTC+01:00 (CET)
  - Summer (DST): UTC+02:00 (CEST)
- INSEE/Postal code: 87082 /87500
- ^{1} French Land Register data, which excludes lakes, ponds, glaciers > 1 km^{2} (0.386 sq mi or 247 acres) and river estuaries.

Ladignac-le-Long (French pronunciation: [ladiɲak lə lɔ̃]; Occitan: Ladinhac) is a commune in the Haute-Vienne department in the Nouvelle-Aquitaine region in west-central France.

Inhabitants are known as Ladignacois in French.

== See also ==
- Communes of the Haute-Vienne department
