= Lavignac =

- Commune
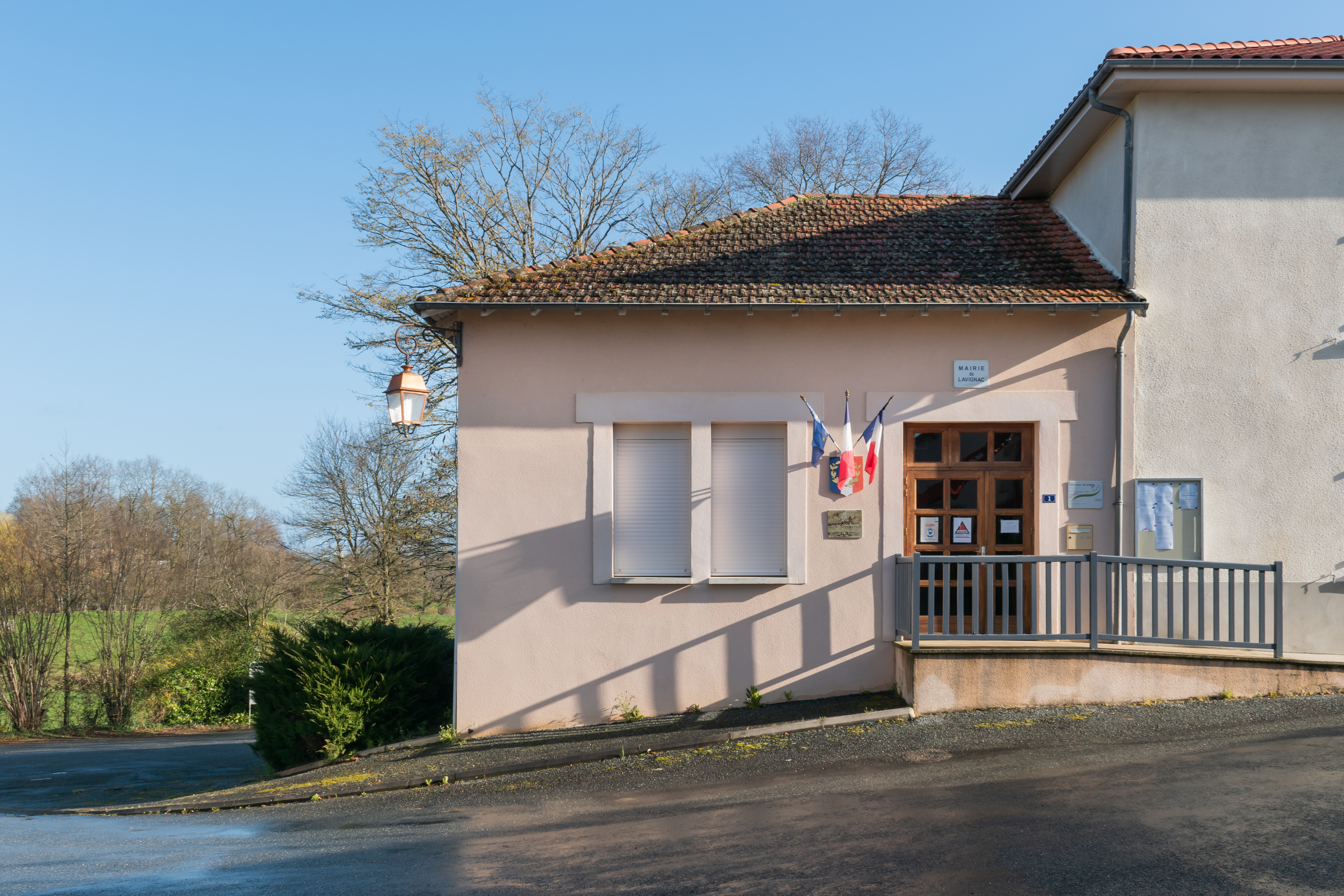
- Town hall of Lavignac
- Location of Lavignac
- Location within France Location within Nouvelle-Aquitaine
- Coordinates: 45°43′21″N 1°07′12″E
- Country: France
- Region: Nouvelle-Aquitaine
- Department: Haute-Vienne
- Arrondissement: Limoges
- Canton: Saint-Yrieix-la-Perche

Government
  - Mayor (2020–2026): Gérard Chaminade
- Area^{1}: 6.04 km^{2} (2.33 sq mi)
- Highest elevation: 345 m (1,132 ft)
- Lowest elevation: 256 m (840 ft)
- Population (2023): 171
  - Density: 28.3/km^{2} (73.3/sq mi)
- Time zone: UTC+01:00 (CET)
  - Summer (DST): UTC+02:00 (CEST)
- INSEE/Postal code: 87084 /87230
- ^{1} French Land Register data, which excludes lakes, ponds, glaciers > 1 km^{2} (0.386 sq mi or 247 acres) and river estuaries.

Lavignac (French pronunciation: [laviɲak]; Occitan: Lavinhac) is a commune in the Haute-Vienne department in the Nouvelle-Aquitaine region in west-central France.

== See also ==
- Communes of the Haute-Vienne department
