= Canton of Saint-Yrieix-la-Perche =

Administrative division in France

Coordinates: 45.51°N 1.20°E

The canton of Saint-Yrieix-la-Perche is an administrative division of the Haute-Vienne department, western France. Its borders were modified at the French canton reorganisation which came into effect in March 2015. Its seat is in Saint-Yrieix-la-Perche.

It consists of the following communes:

1. Bussière-Galant
2. Les Cars
3. Le Chalard
4. Châlus
5. Flavignac
6. Glandon
7. Janailhac
8. Ladignac-le-Long
9. Lavignac
10. Meilhac
11. La Meyze
12. Nexon
13. Pageas
14. Rilhac-Lastours
15. La Roche-l'Abeille
16. Saint-Hilaire-les-Places
17. Saint-Yrieix-la-Perche
