= Rilhac-Lastours =

- Commune
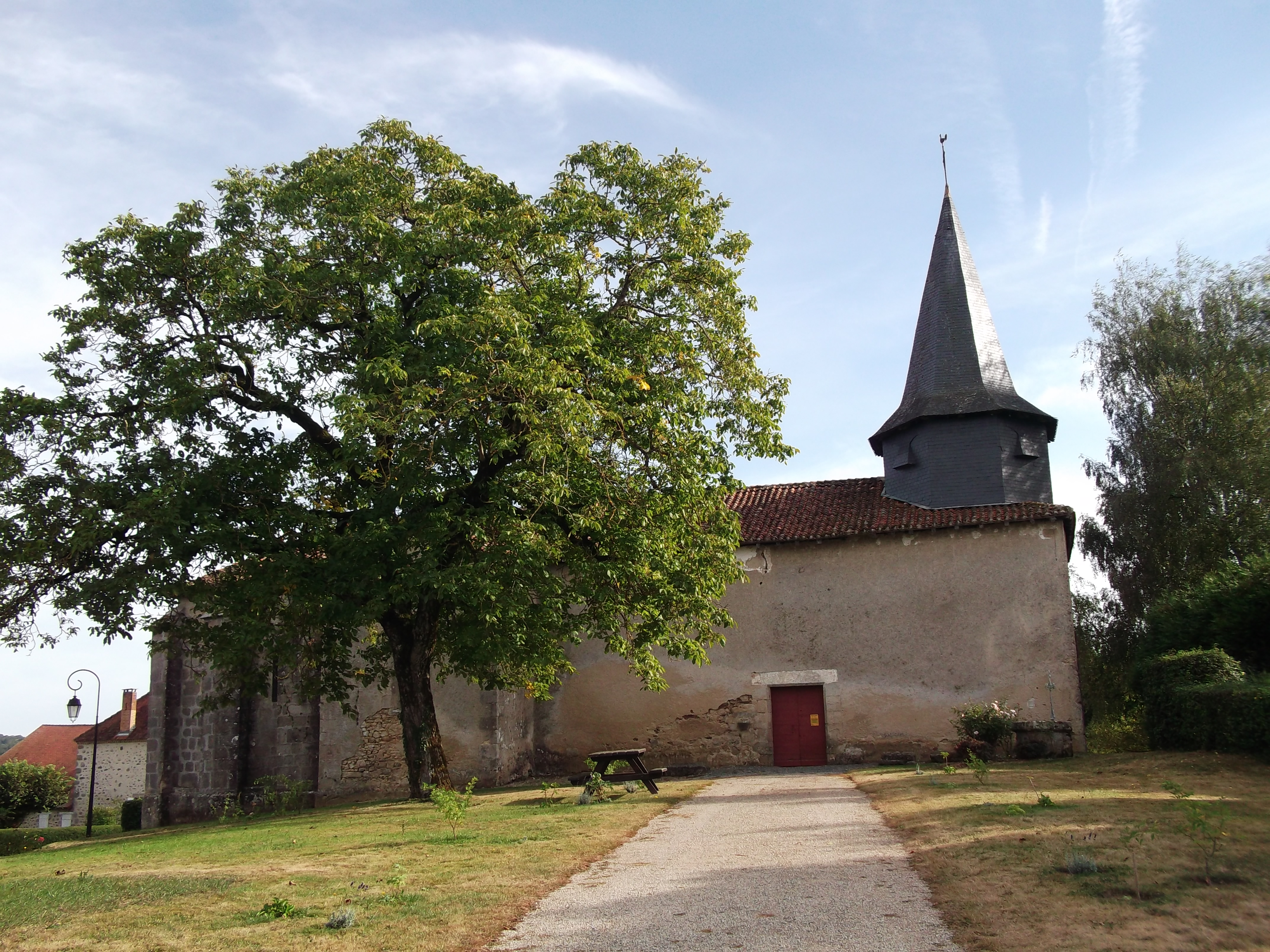
- The church of St-Pierre-ès-Liens, in Lastours

- Coat of arms
- Location of Rilhac-Lastours
- Location within France Location within Nouvelle-Aquitaine
- Coordinates: 45°38′59″N 1°07′17″E
- Country: France
- Region: Nouvelle-Aquitaine
- Department: Haute-Vienne
- Arrondissement: Limoges
- Canton: Saint-Yrieix-la-Perche
- Intercommunality: Pays de Nexon-Monts de Châlus

Government
  - Mayor (2020–2026): Jacques Barry
- Area^{1}: 16.32 km^{2} (6.30 sq mi)
- Highest elevation: 557 m (1,827 ft)
- Lowest elevation: 315 m (1,033 ft)
- Population (2023): 385
  - Density: 23.6/km^{2} (61.1/sq mi)
- Time zone: UTC+01:00 (CET)
  - Summer (DST): UTC+02:00 (CEST)
- INSEE/Postal code: 87124 /87800
- ^{1} French Land Register data, which excludes lakes, ponds, glaciers > 1 km^{2} (0.386 sq mi or 247 acres) and river estuaries.

Rilhac-Lastours (Limousin: Rilhac de Las Tors) is a commune in the Haute-Vienne department in the Nouvelle-Aquitaine region in west-central France.

== History ==
Lithic (stone) tools from the Mesolithic period, along with pottery fragments from the Chalcolithic (Copper Age) and Middle Bronze Age, attest to human presence in the area during these prehistoric and protohistoric periods.

== See also ==
- Gouffier of Lastours
- Château de Lastours
- Communes of the Haute-Vienne department
