= Château de Lastours =

Ruined castle in Nouvelle-Aquitaine, France

Coordinates: 45°38′58″N 1°7′16″E

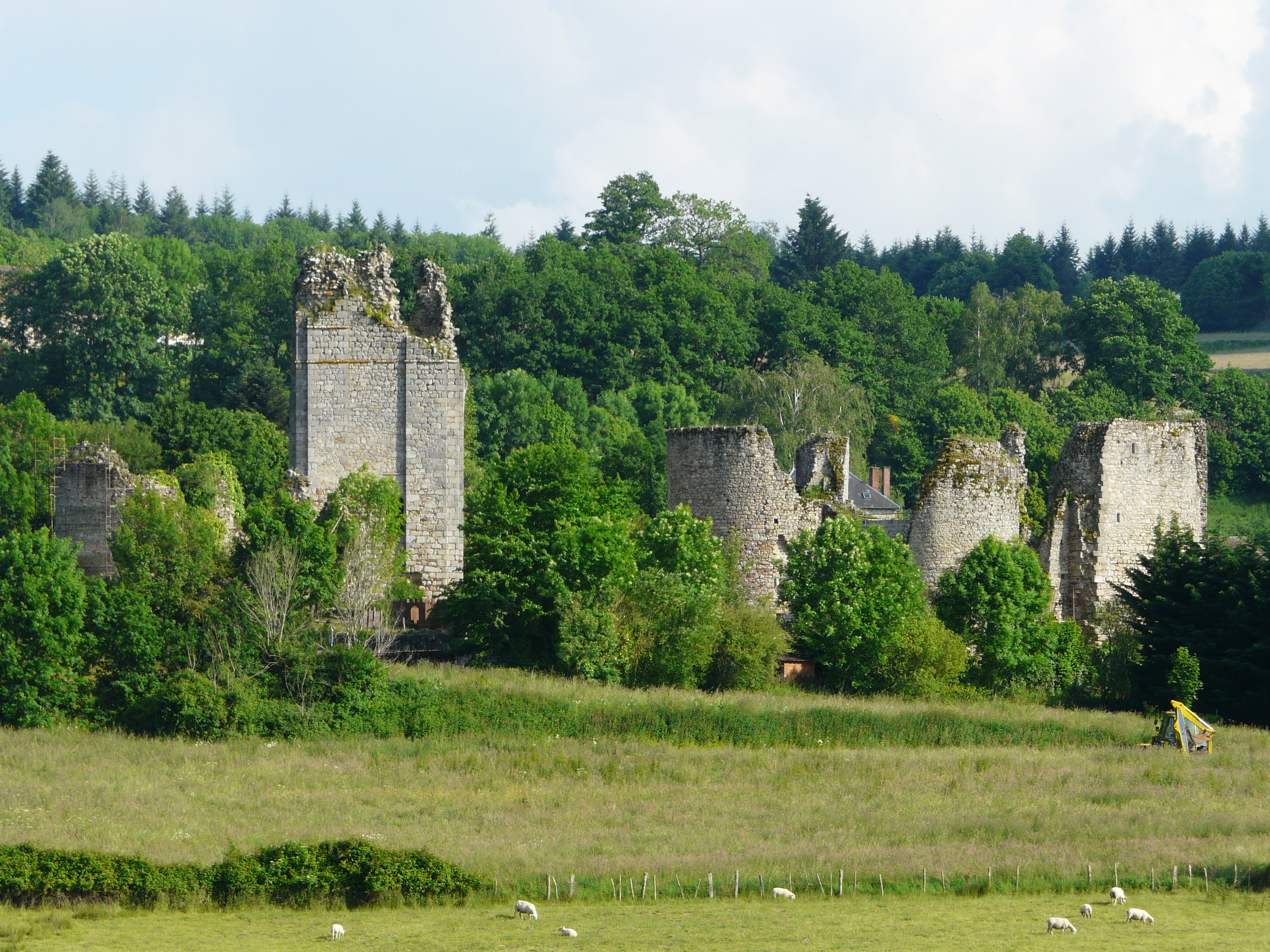
Lastours Castle, Haute-Vienne, France

The Château de Lastours (Limousin: Chasteu de Las Tors) is a ruined castle in the commune of Rilhac-Lastours in the Haute-Vienne département of France.

Construction began in the 12th century. Today in ruins, it was the former seat of the seigneurs and later barons of Lastours. It still has several corner towers and the base of the keep, altered in the 16th century. A voluntary association, over several decades, restored the castle, one of the high points of Limousin history.

It has been listed since 1956 as a monument historique by the French Ministry of Culture.

== See also ==
- Gouffier of Lastours
- List of castles in France
