= Meilhac =

- Commune
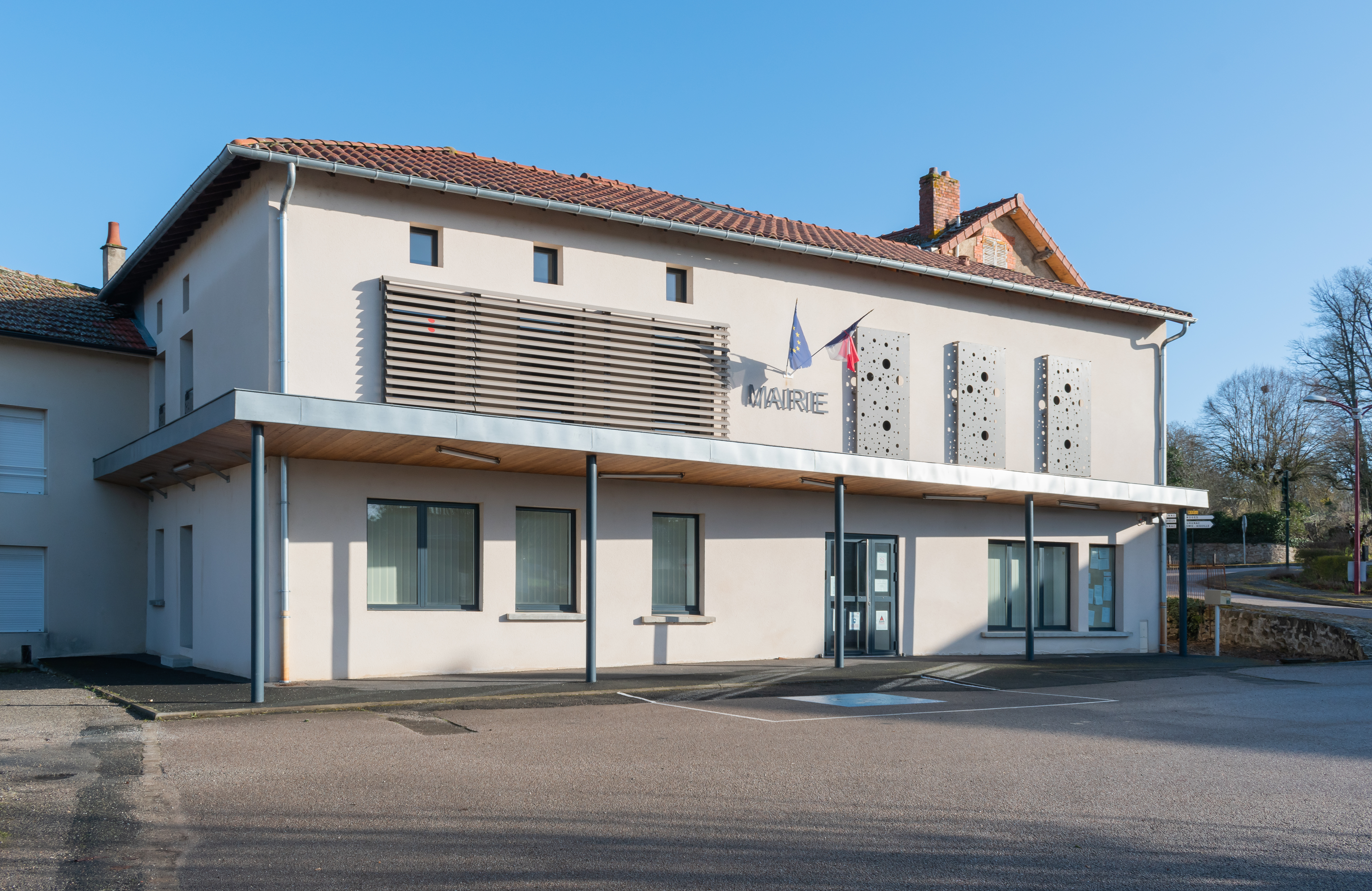
- Town hall of Meilhac
- Location of Meilhac
- Location within France Location within Nouvelle-Aquitaine
- Coordinates: 45°42′51″N 1°09′27″E
- Country: France
- Region: Nouvelle-Aquitaine
- Department: Haute-Vienne
- Arrondissement: Limoges
- Canton: Saint-Yrieix-la-Perche
- Intercommunality: Pays de Nexon-Monts de Châlus

Government
  - Mayor (2020–2026): Jean-Marie Massy
- Area^{1}: 14.84 km^{2} (5.73 sq mi)
- Highest elevation: 366 m (1,201 ft)
- Lowest elevation: 259 m (850 ft)
- Population (2023): 529
  - Density: 35.6/km^{2} (92.3/sq mi)
- Time zone: UTC+01:00 (CET)
  - Summer (DST): UTC+02:00 (CEST)
- INSEE/Postal code: 87094 /87800
- ^{1} French Land Register data, which excludes lakes, ponds, glaciers > 1 km^{2} (0.386 sq mi or 247 acres) and river estuaries.

Meilhac (French pronunciation: [mɛjak]; Occitan: Melhac) is a commune in the Haute-Vienne department in the Nouvelle-Aquitaine region in west-central France.

Inhabitants are known as Meilhacois.

== See also ==
- Communes of the Haute-Vienne department
