= Hautefort =

- Commune
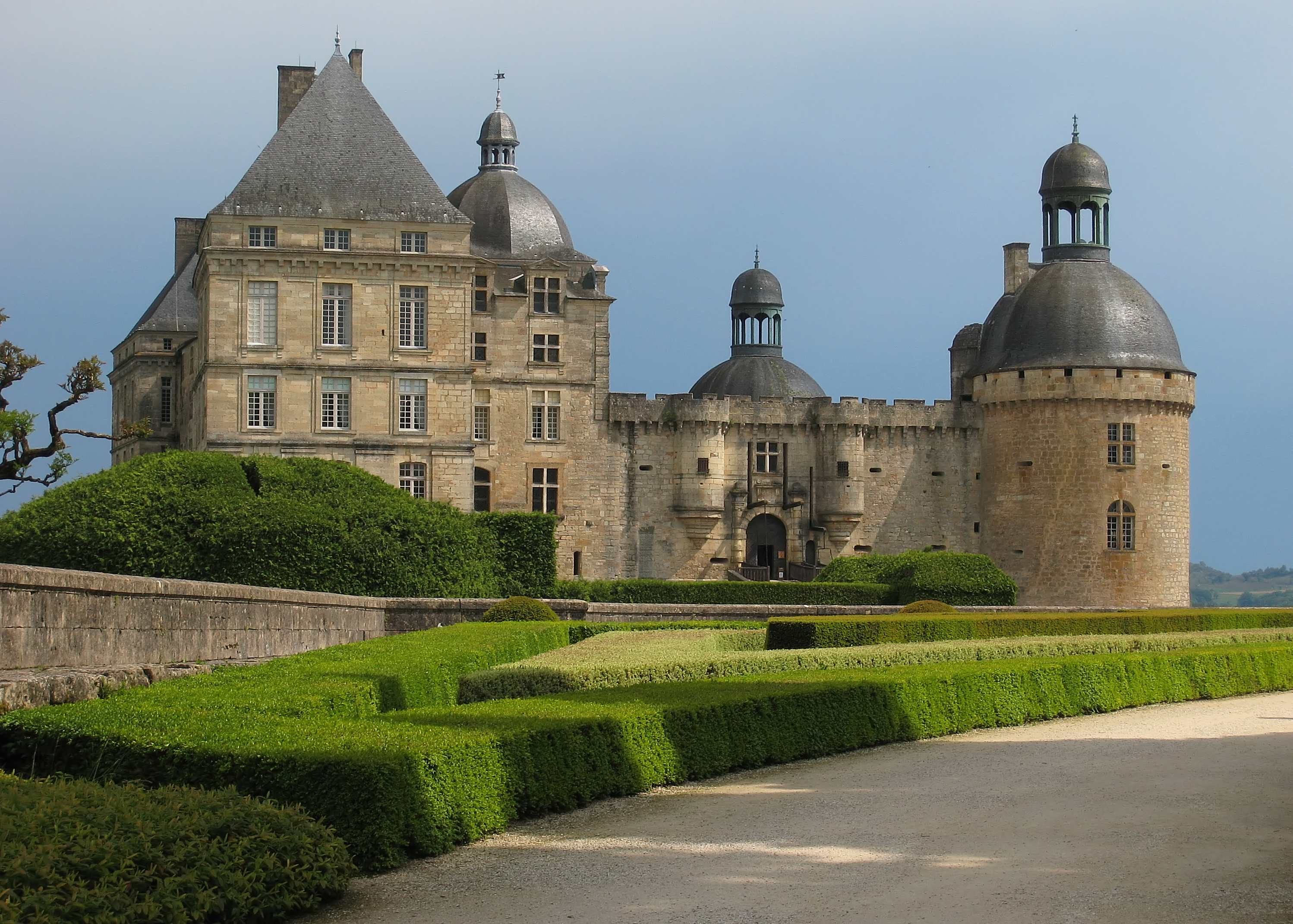
- Chateau

- Coat of arms
- Location of Hautefort
- Location within France Location within Nouvelle-Aquitaine
- Coordinates: 45°15′37″N 1°08′55″E
- Country: France
- Region: Nouvelle-Aquitaine
- Department: Dordogne
- Arrondissement: Sarlat-la-Canéda
- Canton: Haut-Périgord Noir

Government
  - Mayor (2020–2026): Jean-Louis Pujols
- Area^{1}: 25.68 km^{2} (9.92 sq mi)
- Elevation: 231 m (758 ft)
- Highest elevation: 271 m (889 ft)
- Lowest elevation: 145 m (476 ft)
- Population (2023): 806
  - Density: 31.4/km^{2} (81.3/sq mi)
- Time zone: UTC+01:00 (CET)
  - Summer (DST): UTC+02:00 (CEST)
- INSEE/Postal code: 24210 /24390
- ^{1} French Land Register data, which excludes lakes, ponds, glaciers > 1 km^{2} (0.386 sq mi or 247 acres) and river estuaries.

Hautefort (French pronunciation: [otfɔʁ]; Occitan: Autafòrt) is a commune in the Dordogne department in Nouvelle-Aquitaine in southwestern France.

It was part of the former province of Périgord.

== History ==
The ancient fortress dates back to the early Middle Ages, as proved by the first document quoting its existence as early as 987. A house of Gouffier de Lastours, who won fame during the First Crusade, the castle then became the seigneurial home of the troubadour Bertran de Born, who was viscount of Hautefort.

== Population ==
Historical population
Year	Pop.	±% p.a.
1968	1,022	—
1975	1,142	+1.60%
1982	1,035	−1.40%
1990	1,048	+0.16%
1999	1,184	+1.36%
2007	1,110	−0.80%
2012	1,078	−0.58%
2017	928	−2.95%
2023	806	−2.32%
Source: INSEE

== Sights ==
- Château de Hautefort, 17th century

== See also ==
- Les Charreaux, a village depending on the commune of Hautefort.
- Communes of the Dordogne department
