= Pageas =

- Commune
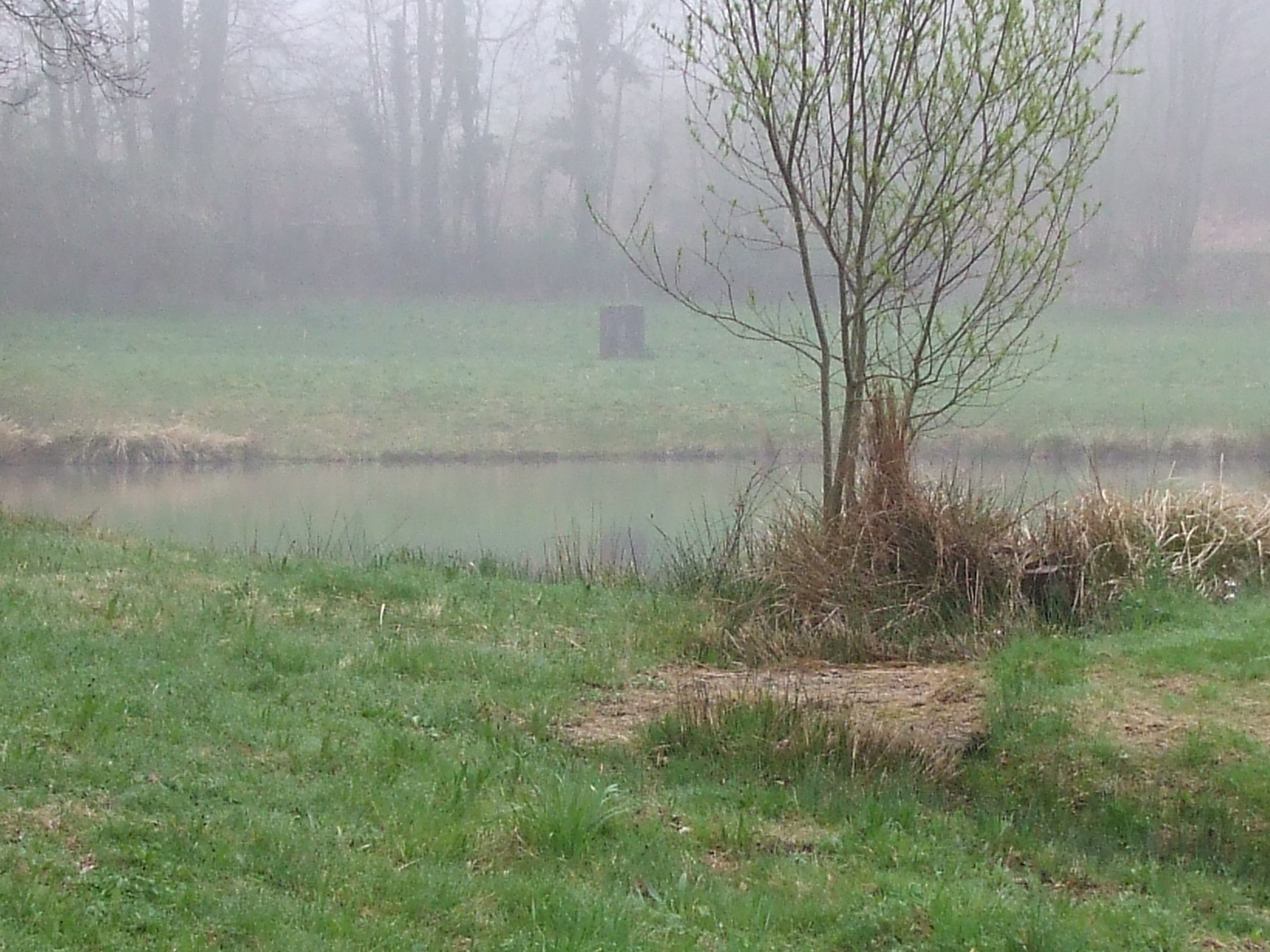
- Countryside in Pageas
- Location of Pageas
- Location within France Location within Nouvelle-Aquitaine
- Coordinates: 45°40′43″N 1°00′02″E
- Country: France
- Region: Nouvelle-Aquitaine
- Department: Haute-Vienne
- Arrondissement: Limoges
- Canton: Saint-Yrieix-la-Perche
- Intercommunality: Pays de Nexon-Monts de Châlus

Government
  - Mayor (2020–2026): Bernadette Lacote
- Area^{1}: 27.76 km^{2} (10.72 sq mi)
- Highest elevation: 520 m (1,710 ft)
- Lowest elevation: 288 m (945 ft)
- Population (2023): 644
  - Density: 23.2/km^{2} (60.1/sq mi)
- Time zone: UTC+01:00 (CET)
  - Summer (DST): UTC+02:00 (CEST)
- INSEE/Postal code: 87112 /87230
- ^{1} French Land Register data, which excludes lakes, ponds, glaciers > 1 km^{2} (0.386 sq mi or 247 acres) and river estuaries.

Pageas (French pronunciation: [paʒas]; Occitan: Pajas) is a commune in the Haute-Vienne department in the Nouvelle-Aquitaine region in west-central France.

== Population ==
Inhabitants are known as Pageaciens in French.

Historical population
| Year | Pop. | ±% p.a. |
|---|---|---|
| 1968 | 638 | — |
| 1975 | 568 | −1.65% |
| 1982 | 552 | −0.41% |
| 1990 | 602 | +1.09% |
| 1999 | 594 | −0.15% |
| 2007 | 615 | +0.44% |
| 2012 | 603 | −0.39% |
| 2017 | 580 | −0.77% |
| 2023 | 644 | +1.76% |
Source: INSEE

== See also ==
- Communes of the Haute-Vienne department
