= Crusade cycle =

Epic poems loosely based on the First Crusade

The Crusade cycle is an Old French literary cycle of chansons de geste concerning the First Crusade and its aftermath.

== History ==
The cycle contains a number of initially unrelated texts, collated into interconnected narratives by later redactors. None of the poems in the cycle survive independently, and the thirteen separate collections are all organized in different orders with different texts. The manuscripts were all written between approximately 1350 and 1425, in northeastern France, probably in Picardy.

The original poem in the cycle was the Chanson d'Antioche, which is the basis for the "historical" section of the cycle. The original Chanson d'Antioche is lost, but it was edited in the 12th century by Graindor de Douai, who also edited the Chanson de Jérusalem, and possibly wrote the Chanson des chétifs himself. These three chansons form the basis for the rest of the cycle, and are more historically oriented than the Romances that grew up around them.

== The cycle ==
=== Godfrey's ancestors and his early life ===
The protagonist of these three chansons is Godfrey of Bouillon, around whom the rest of the cycle is based, in a much more romanticized form. These connect Godfrey with the legend of the Swan Knight. Even medieval redactors recognized that this part of the cycle was fanciful and did not quite match the historical chansons, and they are usually separated in the manuscripts. The first episode chronologically within the cycle is the Naissance du Chevalier au Cygne, which survives in two forms, the Elioxe and the Beatrix. In the former, Elioxe has children with King Lothair; in the latter, Beatrix is married to King Orient. In both cases, they have seven children, who are all turned into swans. All but one are able to transform back into humans; this swan then leads the boat of one of his brothers, known as the Swan Knight. Some manuscripts have a version that combines both stories into one.

The Swan Knight's adventures bring him to the defense of the dispossessed Duchess of Bouillon, whose land has been seized by Regnier of Saxony, whom he challenges to a duel. The Swan Knight defeats Regnier and wins the daughter of the Duchess in marriage. They have a daughter, Ida, who can see the future and knows that she is destined to be the mother of Eustace, Godfrey, and Baldwin. The Swan Knight, however, must leave Bouillon when his wife asks his true identity. After leaving Bouillon, his name is revealed to be Elias, and his brother, the swan who led his boat, finally regains his human form. Meanwhile, Elias' kinsmen, the knights Pons and Gerart, decide to make a pilgrimage to Jerusalem, but cannot because the land is under Muslim control. They are seized by Cornumarant, the king of Jerusalem, but he befriends them and allows them to complete their pilgrimage. After drifting at sea for many months they return to Bouillon and recognize Elias as the Swan Knight.

Years later, Ida is married to Count Eustace of Boulogne, and has three children, Eustace, Godfrey, and Baldwin. Eustace and Godfrey grow up to become knights, with all the appropriate adventures and duels. Meanwhile, Cornumarant's mother Calibre, who, like Ida, can see the future, predicts the coming of Godfrey and his brothers as well as the later crusades against Saladin. Cornumarant decides to visit Godfrey, whose kin he once hosted in Jerusalem, and on the way meets various future leaders of the First Crusade: Bohemund, Tancred, Raymond IV of Toulouse, Adhemar of Le Puy, Hugh of Vermandois, and Robert Curthose, among others. Cornumarant intends to assassinate Godfrey but is overcome by the latter's glory; he realizes he can never hold Jerusalem if Godfrey invades, thus planting the idea for the crusade in Godfrey's mind. Cornumarant, returns to Jerusalem and is accused of treason for not having accomplished his task; many battles and duels are fought. During this time, Godfrey arrives and attacks the cities of Syria.

=== "Historical" cycle ===
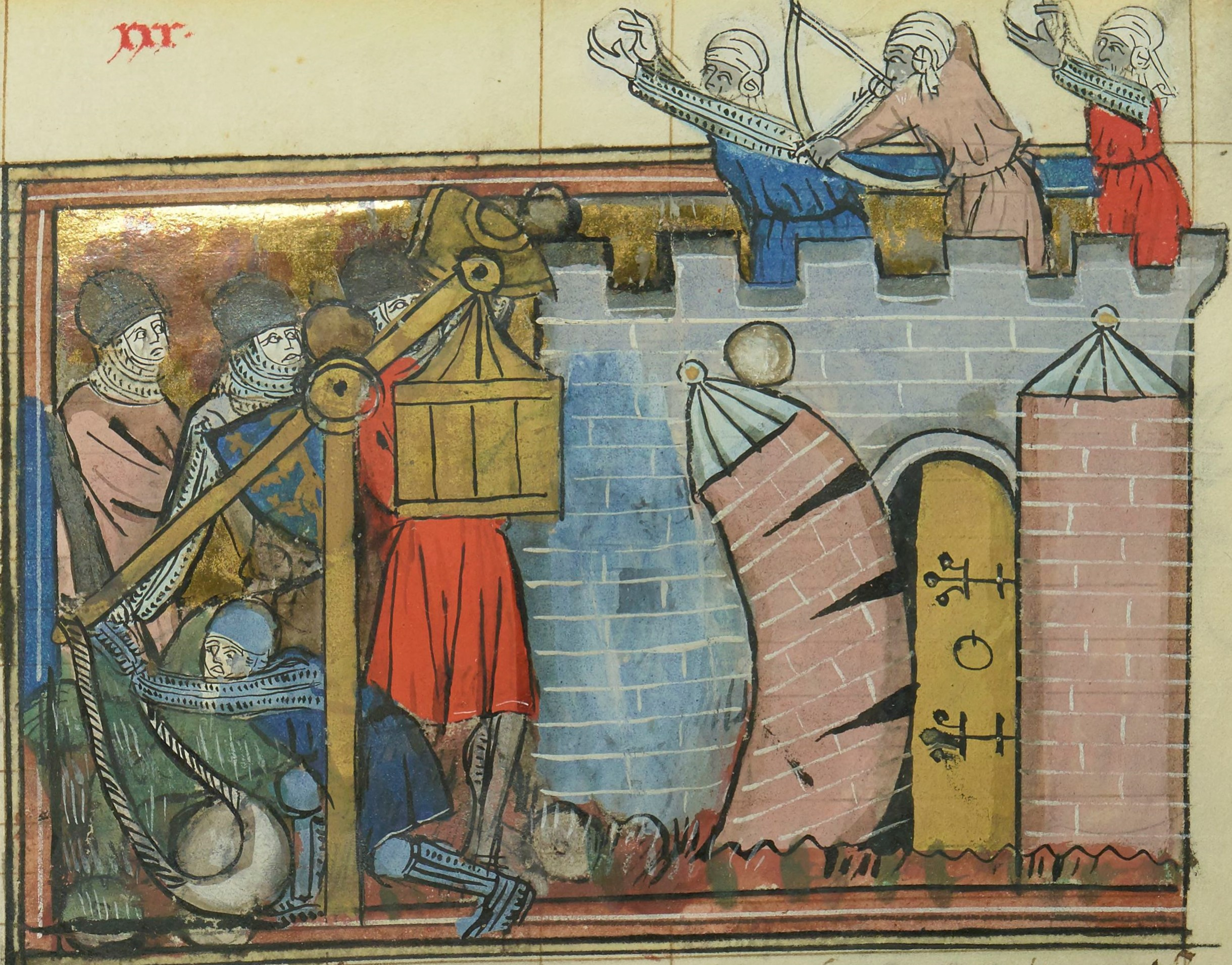
Siege of Nicaea

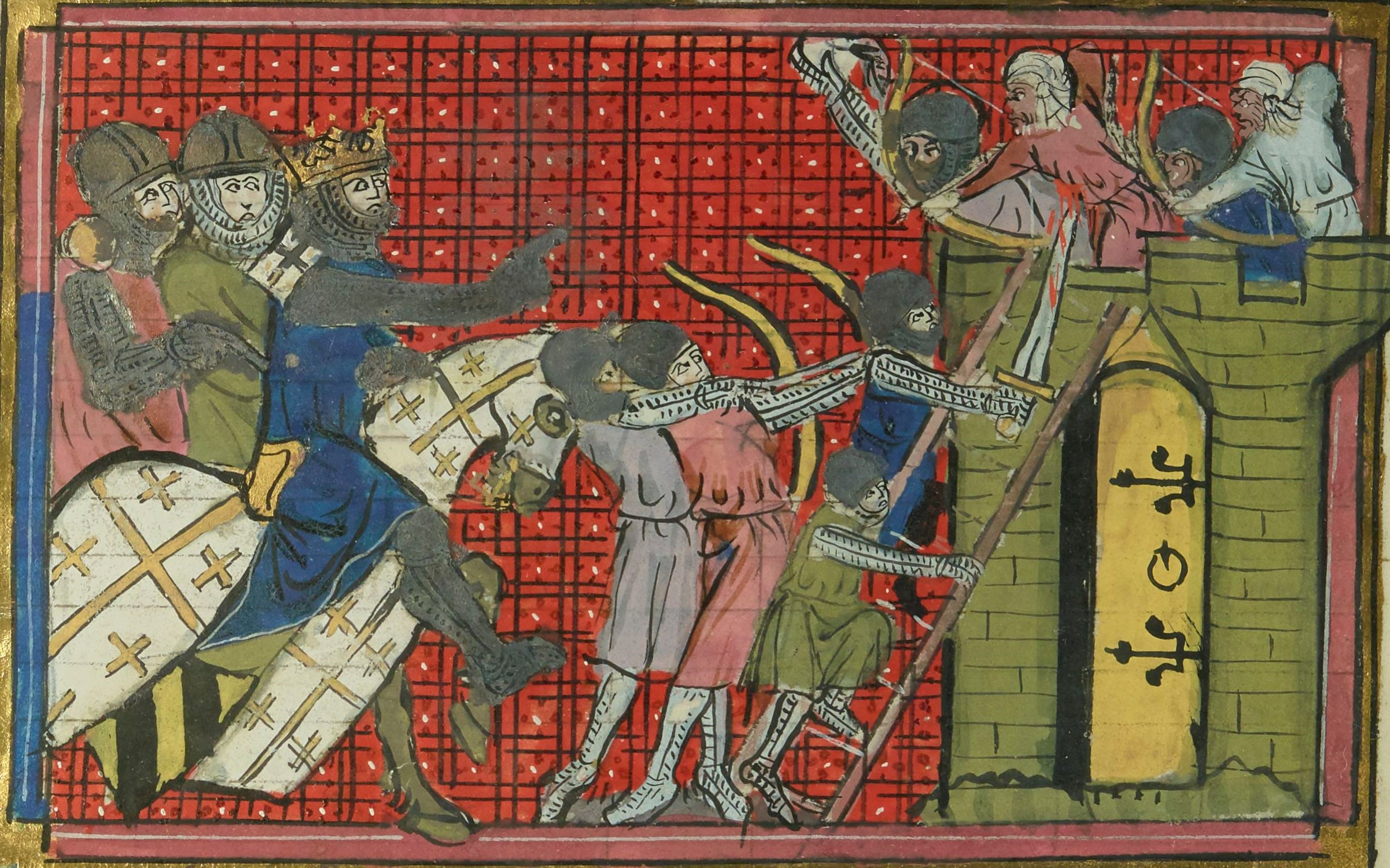
Siege of Artah

Miniatures from Roman de Godefroy de Bouillon et de Saladin.

This leads to the original, and undoubtedly the most famous, poem in the cycle, the Chanson d'Antioche. Its subject is the preaching of the First Crusade, the preparations for departure, the tearful goodbyes, the arrival at Constantinople and the siege and taking of Antioch, where King Corbaran (a corruption of the name of Kerbogha, the atabeg of Mosul who came to Antioch's defence in 1098) is defeated by Godfrey and the Crusaders. The lost original poem was said to have been composed by Richard le Pèlerin, who was present during the siege. Although a fictionalized account of the First Crusade, it is based on historical events and is not as fabulous and romanticized as the poems dealing with Godfrey's early life.

Following the capture of Antioch, Corbaran returns home with the Christian chétifs ("captives"). Corbaran is accused of treason by the sultan for losing the battle, and one of the Christian prisoners must fight a duel in his place. The chétifs then attack and kill the dragon Sathanas, in perhaps the most fanciful episode of the cycle. In a third episode, Arpin of Bourges saves Corbaran's son from various misadventures, and the chétifs are set free to join the rest of the crusaders on the way to Jerusalem.

The cycle then returns to Godfrey, now outside Jerusalem, who recruits the chétifs into his army. Bohemund is present at the siege of Jerusalem, unlike the historical Bohemund, who remained behind in Antioch. Cornumarant and the Saracens repeatedly attack the crusader camps, and the crusaders assault the city and are repulsed again and again. Finally the city is taken, but none of the leaders wishes to become king; a sign from God, however, indicates that Godfrey should be crowned. In further battles, Peter the Hermit is captured, and Cornumarant is killed. Most manuscripts end at this point but some continue on to describe the capture of other cities, the death of Godfrey, and the reign of Baldwin, who attacks Egypt and engages in battles with "Dodequin" (the historical Toghtekin of Damascus).

There is also a much shorter prose work, known as the Godefroi de Buillon, a summary of the entire cycle. The author of this work complains about the length of the poetic cycle, and focuses less on the fantastical life of Godfrey and more on the historical crusade. It is one of the first works of prose fiction in French literature.

== Editions ==
The Chanson d'Antioche was first edited by Alexis Paulin Paris in 1848. Subsequent editors of the cycle as a whole include Stengel in 1873, Smith in 1912, Krüger in 1936, Duparc-Quioc in 1955, Sumberg in 1968, and the critical editions published by the University of Alabama (1977–2003).

The University of Alabama editions are divided as follows:

1. La Naissance du Chevalier au Cygne: Elioxe, ed. Emanuel J. Mickel Jr., and Beatrix, ed. Jan A. Nelson
2. Le Chevalier au Cygne and La Fin d'Elias, ed. Jan A. Nelson
3. Les Enfances de Godefroi and Le Retour de Cornumarant, ed. Emanuel J. Mickel
4. La Chanson d'Antioche, ed. Jan A. Nelson
5. Les Chétifs, ed. Geoffrey M. Myers
6. La Chanson de Jérusalem, ed. Nigel R. Thorp
7. The Jérusalem Continuations, part I: La Chrétienté Corbaran, ed. Peter R. Grillo
8. The Jérusalem Continuations, part II: La Prise d'Acre, La Mort Godefroi, and La Chanson des Rois Baudoin, ed. Peter R. Grillo
9. The Jérusalem Continuations: The London-Turin Version, ed. Peter R. Grillo
10. La Geste du Chevalier au Cygne, ed. Edmond A. Emplaincourt
11. Godefroi de Buillon, ed. Jan Boyd Roberts
