= Guilhem Anelier =

13th-century French troubadour

Guilhem Anelier de Tolosa (also William or Guillaume) was a troubadour from Languedoc. He was the author of a thirteenth-century Occitan epic poem La Guerra de Navarra, recounting the civil war in Navarre in 1276–7. It was published in 1856 as Histoire de la guerre de Navarre en 1276 et 1277, by Francisque Michel. It has been described as a canso.
