= Canso d'Antioca =

12th-century Occitan epic poem

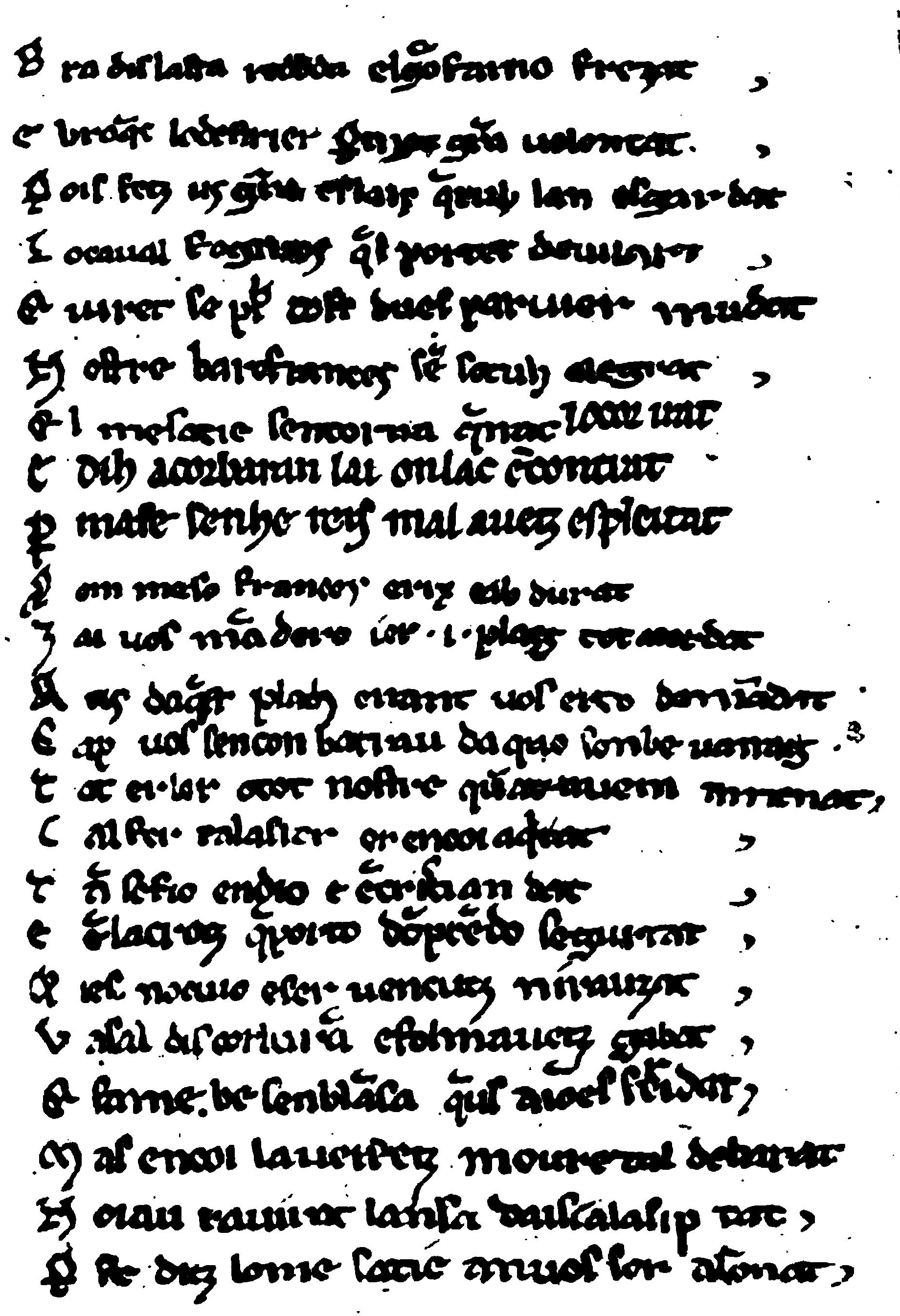
Madrid, Bibl. Acad. Real de Historia, MS. Canso d'Antioca, f. 6v

The Canso d'Antioca is a late twelfth-century Occitan epic poem in the form of a chanson de geste describing the First Crusade up to the Siege of Antioch (1098). It survives only in a single manuscript fragment of 707 alexandrines, now preserved in Madrid.

The Canso was a reworking of a lost earlier Occitan epic history of the First Crusade written by one Gregory Bechada and commissioned by Bishop Eustorge of Limoges probably between 1106 and 1118. Being based partially on eyewitness testimony, the Canso is as a source for the Occitan participation at Antioch. It emphasises the feats of the knights of southern France and southern Italy, especially Gouffier de Lastours and the Normans under Bohemond of Taranto. In its completed form it may have also told the story of Count Raymond IV of Toulouse, but he is not mentioned in the surviving fragment.

The Canso also served as the literary model for the early thirteenth-century Chanson de la Croisade Albigeoise of William of Tudela and for the late thirteenth-century History of the War of Navarre of William Anelier. Portions of it were also translated into Castilian for the Gran Conquista de Ultramar, which also contains unique material possibly borrowed from the complete version of the Canso or from Bechada's earlier epic.
