= John of Alta Silva =

John of Alta Silva (French: Jean de Haute-Seille, Latin: Iohannes de Alta Silva) was a Cistercian monk who lived at the abbey of Haute-Seille in the late 12th century. He wrote a version of the story of the Seven Wise Masters in Latin prose entitled De rege et septem sapientibus (On the King and the Seven Sages), but better known by the title it was later given, Dolopathos.

All that is known of John is what he relates in the preface of his work. John was educated in grammar and rhetoric. He was familiar with the classics and the Bible and his story is packed with quotations from both, including the actual Virgil and Ovid. He dedicated his work to his bishop, Bertram of Metz, who governed that diocese from 1180 until 1212.

John's version, which he calls an opusculum (little work), is quite different from later Western versions of the Seven Masters. In his version, Sicily is ruled by a king named Dolopathos at the time when Augustus was Roman emperor. Dolopathos sends his son, Lucinius, to be educated by Virgil, both poet and sorcerer in this story. When the fourteen-year-old prince is summoned whom following his mother's death, Virgil orders him not to speak a word until they meet again. His stepmother attempts to seduce him and, when he rejects her advances, falsely accuses him of rape, whereupon Dolopathos condemns his son to death. (This episode is similar to the story of Phaedra or Potiphar's wife.) This is all a frame story for the series of seven stories that follow. The king postpones the execution one day for each day that a sage appears to tell a story. Virgil appears last and attacks the queen. Dolopathos then releases his son and executes the queen. In the end, Lucinius converts to Christianity.

The trouvère Herbert produced an Old French verse rendition of John's Dolopathos, albeit with some changes introduced from other traditions.

== Editions ==
- Dolopathos, or The King and the Seven Wise Men. Translated by Brady B. Gilleland. Center for Medieval and Early Renaissance Studies, 1981.
- Dolopathos. Italian translation by Giovanni Pasetti. Edizioni Provincia di Mantova, 1995.
