= Saint-Yrieix-la-Perche =

- Commune
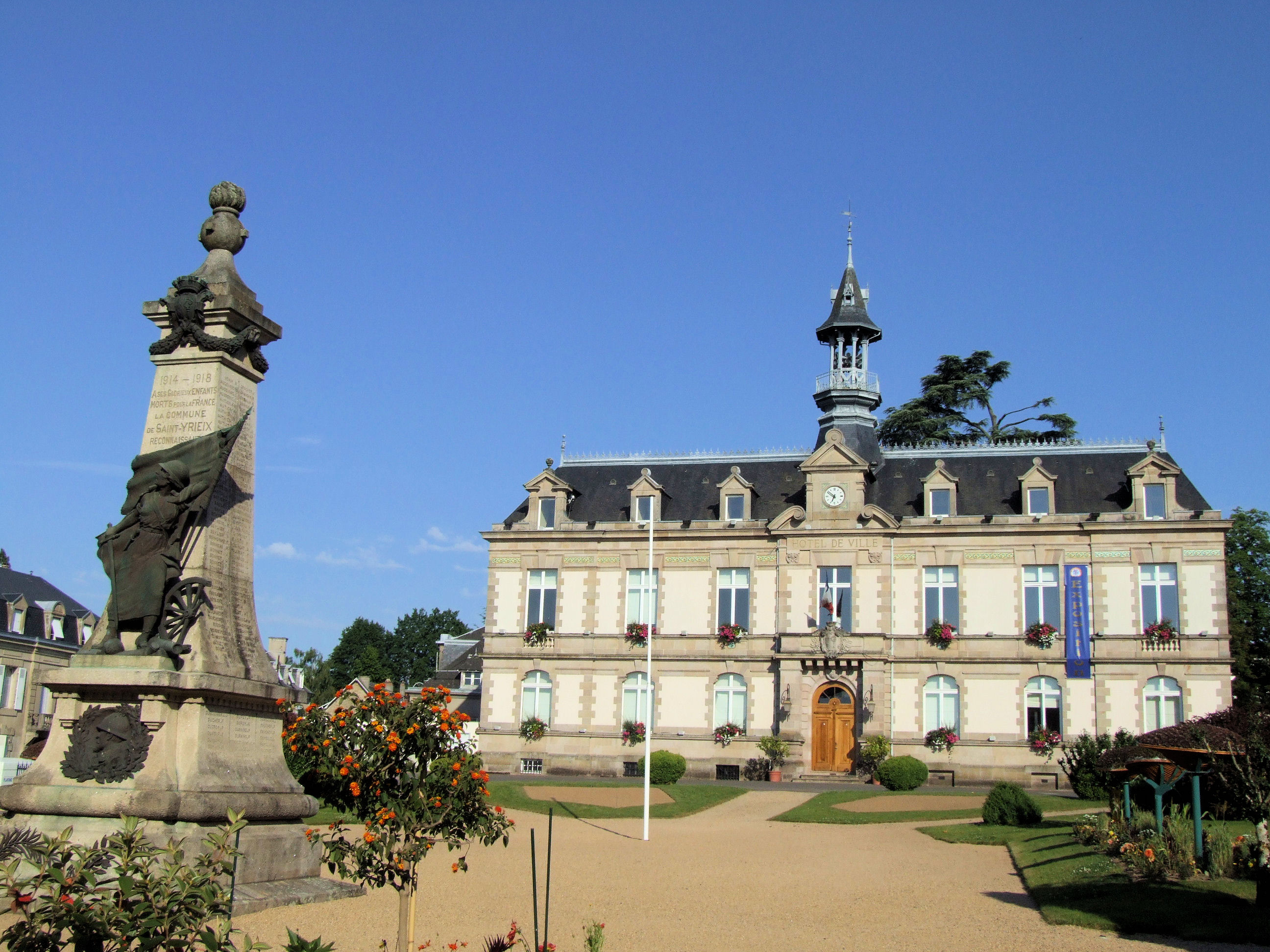
- Town hall

- Coat of arms
- Location of Saint-Yrieix-la-Perche
- Location within France Location within Nouvelle-Aquitaine
- Coordinates: 45°30′55″N 1°12′15″E
- Country: France
- Region: Nouvelle-Aquitaine
- Department: Haute-Vienne
- Arrondissement: Limoges
- Canton: Saint-Yrieix-la-Perche
- Intercommunality: Pays de Saint-Yrieix

Government
  - Mayor (2020–2026): Daniel Boisserie
- Area^{1}: 100.98 km^{2} (38.99 sq mi)
- Elevation: 369 m (1,211 ft)
- Highest elevation: 498 m (1,634 ft)
- Lowest elevation: 283 m (928 ft)
- Population (2023): 6,830
  - Density: 67.6/km^{2} (175/sq mi)
- Time zone: UTC+01:00 (CET)
  - Summer (DST): UTC+02:00 (CEST)
- INSEE/Postal code: 87187 /87500
- ^{1} French Land Register data, which excludes lakes, ponds, glaciers > 1 km^{2} (0.386 sq mi or 247 acres) and river estuaries.

Saint-Yrieix-la-Perche (French pronunciation: [sɛ̃t‿iʁje la pɛʁʃ]; Occitan: Sent Iriès, Sent Irièg) is a commune in the Haute-Vienne department, region of Nouvelle-Aquitaine, France.

It is significant as the first place where kaolin was found in France, a discovery of great importance to French porcelain manufacturers.

Its name refers to Saint Yrieix (Aredius). Inhabitants are known as Arédiens. Saint-Yrieix-la-Perche station has rail connections to Brive-la-Gaillarde and Limoges.

== Population ==
Historical population
Year	Pop.	±% p.a.
1968	6,816	—
1975	7,116	+0.62%
1982	7,342	+0.45%
1990	7,558	+0.36%
1999	7,251	−0.46%
2007	6,980	−0.47%
2012	6,887	−0.27%
2017	6,766	−0.35%
2023	6,830	+0.16%
Source: INSEE

== Climate ==
On average, Saint-Yrieix-la-Perche experiences 41.8 days per year with a minimum temperature below 0 °C (32.0 °F), 0.4 days per year with a minimum temperature below −10 °C (14.0 °F), 3.6 days per year with a maximum temperature below 0 °C (32.0 °F), and 11.2 days per year with a maximum temperature above 30 °C (86.0 °F). The record high temperature was 38.7 °C (101.7 °F) on 11 August 2025, while the record low temperature was −12.8 °C (9.0 °F) on 9 February 2012.

Climate data for Saint-Yrieix-la-Perche (1994–2020 averages)
Month	Jan	Feb	Mar	Apr	May	Jun	Jul	Aug	Sep	Oct	Nov	Dec	Year
Record high °C (°F)	16.6 (61.9)	23.9 (75.0)	24.2 (75.6)	27.9 (82.2)	31.4 (88.5)	35.8 (96.4)	38.4 (101.1)	38.7 (101.7)	33.5 (92.3)	31.5 (88.7)	22.5 (72.5)	17.4 (63.3)	38.7 (101.7)
Mean daily maximum °C (°F)	7.4 (45.3)	8.6 (47.5)	12.4 (54.3)	15.4 (59.7)	19.0 (66.2)	22.8 (73.0)	24.8 (76.6)	24.9 (76.8)	21.1 (70.0)	16.8 (62.2)	10.9 (51.6)	8.2 (46.8)	16.0 (60.8)
Daily mean °C (°F)	4.5 (40.1)	5.0 (41.0)	8.0 (46.4)	10.6 (51.1)	14.0 (57.2)	17.6 (63.7)	19.3 (66.7)	19.3 (66.7)	16.0 (60.8)	12.7 (54.9)	7.7 (45.9)	5.1 (41.2)	11.7 (53.1)
Mean daily minimum °C (°F)	1.6 (34.9)	1.4 (34.5)	3.6 (38.5)	5.7 (42.3)	9.0 (48.2)	12.3 (54.1)	13.9 (57.0)	13.8 (56.8)	10.8 (51.4)	8.6 (47.5)	4.4 (39.9)	2.0 (35.6)	7.3 (45.1)
Record low °C (°F)	−9.9 (14.2)	−12.8 (9.0)	−11.1 (12.0)	−4.3 (24.3)	−0.8 (30.6)	2.8 (37.0)	5.0 (41.0)	5.6 (42.1)	1.8 (35.2)	−4.3 (24.3)	−7.8 (18.0)	−10.3 (13.5)	−12.8 (9.0)
Average precipitation mm (inches)	114.3 (4.50)	92.9 (3.66)	91.5 (3.60)	103.9 (4.09)	100.5 (3.96)	78.4 (3.09)	61.8 (2.43)	75.4 (2.97)	75.3 (2.96)	91.3 (3.59)	122.2 (4.81)	122.8 (4.83)	1,130.3 (44.50)
Average precipitation days (≥ 1.0 mm)	13.6	11.9	11.6	12.3	11.6	8.8	8.7	8.8	9.3	11.6	13.7	13.1	135.0
Mean monthly sunshine hours	83.2	114.1	159.6	187.2	219.4	241.8	262.2	241.5	214.1	146.5	90.9	89.0	2,049.5
Source: Meteociel

== See also ==
- Communes of the Haute-Vienne department
