= Conquest of Tarifa =

1292 military operation in present-day Spain

- Part of the Battle of the Strait during the Reconquista
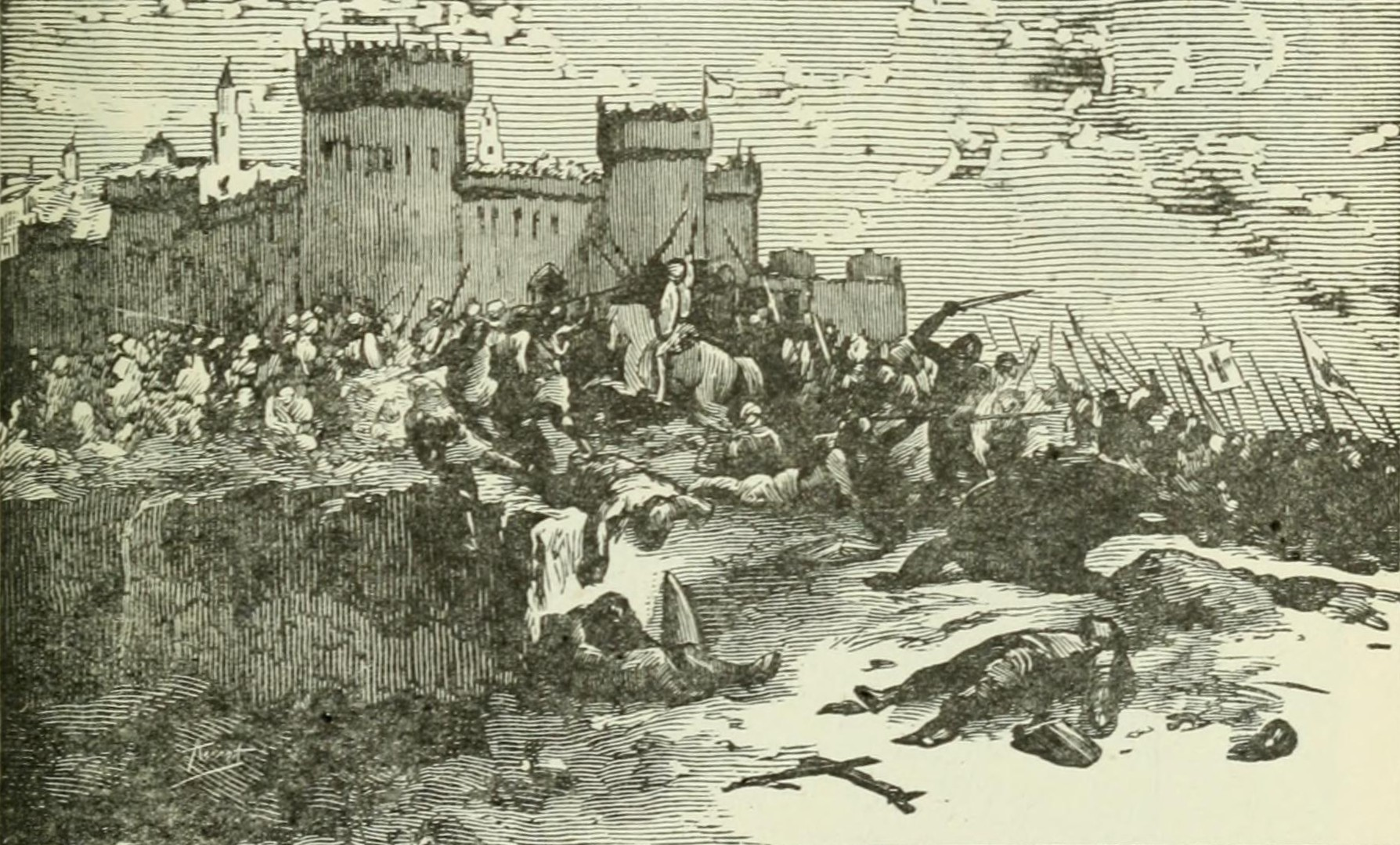
- Conquest of Tarifa by Sancho IV the Brave (19th-century Spanish engraving)
Date	1292
Location	Tarifa
Result	Christian victory

Belligerents
Crown of Castile; Crown of Aragon; Republic of Genoa	Marinid Sultanate

Commanders and leaders
Sancho IV of Castile; Benedetto I Zaccaria	Abu Yaqub

Strength
More than 30 galleys Surroundings of 8,000 horsemen	3,000

Casualties and losses
Unknown	Unknown

The conquest of Tarifa was a military operation in 1292 led by the Crown of Castile with Genoese, Aragonese and Granadan support, in which the city of Tarifa was conquered, then held by the Marinids. The city is strategically located at the southern tip of the Iberian Peninsula, on the north side of the Strait of Gibraltar.

== History ==
The siege of the city, which had maintained a key strategic importance far away from the Middle Ages for the different powers of the zone, consisted of a combined attack of land and naval forces. Since the previous year, Tarifa had been subjected to a naval blockade to prevent the arrival of supplies. The naval contingent, led by the Genoese admiral Benedetto I Zaccaria, was composed of a fleet of Genoese, Castilian and Aragonese ships (the latter sub-commanded by Berenguer de Montoliú). Sancho IV of Castile also provided logistical assistance from the Emirate of Granada. The land siege started in July 1292, after the arrival of Sancho IV.

The forces of Sancho IV entered the city on October 14, 1292.

According to Miguel Ángel Ladero Quesada, the conquest of the city was the most decisive Christian advance in two centuries of conflict in the area of the Strait of Gibraltar.

== Bibliography ==
- Iglesias Rodríguez (2003). Monarquía y nobleza señorial en Andalucía: estudios sobre el señorío de El Puerto (siglos XIII-XVIII). University of Seville. ISBN 84-472-0770-6.
- Ladero Quesada (1993). Castilla y la batalla del estrecho en torno a 1292: la toma de Tarifa. Almoraima : campogibraltareños studio magazine. pp. 15–24. ISSN 1133-5319.
- López Fernández (2013). La conquista de Tarifa y su defensa en tiempos de Sancho IV. Al Qantir. pp. 5–72. ISSN 1989-9815.
- Segura González (2006). La fecha de la conquista de Tarifa por Sancho IV el Bravo. Tarifa: Aljaranda. pp. 4–9. ISSN 1130-7986.
