= Le Chalard =

- Commune
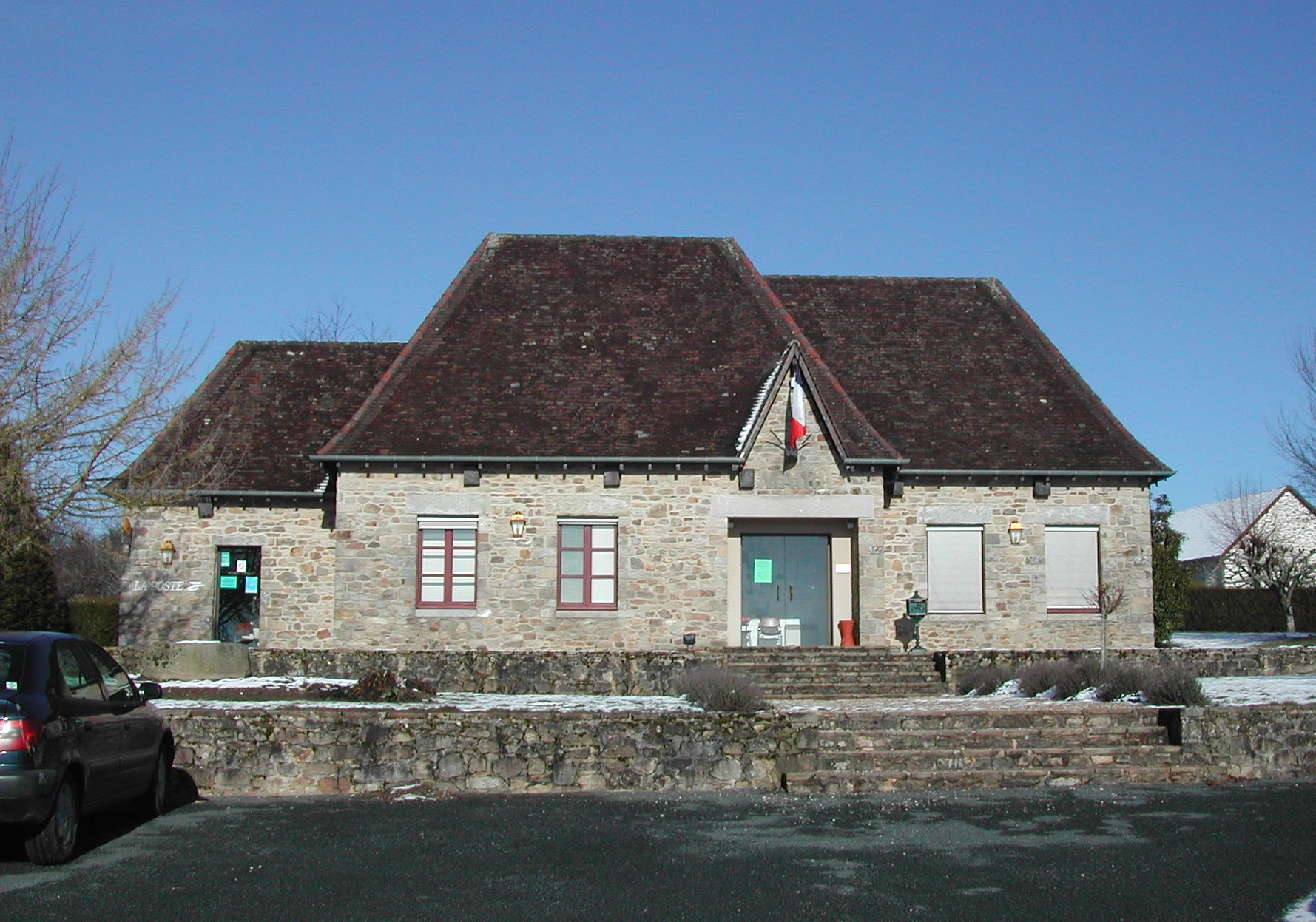
- The town hall of Le Chalard

- Coat of arms
- Location of Le Chalard
- Location within France Location within Nouvelle-Aquitaine
- Coordinates: 45°33′00″N 1°07′54″E
- Country: France
- Region: Nouvelle-Aquitaine
- Department: Haute-Vienne
- Arrondissement: Limoges
- Canton: Saint-Yrieix-la-Perche
- Intercommunality: Pays de Saint-Yrieix

Government
  - Mayor (2020–2026): Annick Huchet
- Area^{1}: 12.42 km^{2} (4.80 sq mi)
- Highest elevation: 362 m (1,188 ft)
- Lowest elevation: 237 m (778 ft)
- Population (2023): 302
  - Density: 24.3/km^{2} (63.0/sq mi)
- Time zone: UTC+01:00 (CET)
  - Summer (DST): UTC+02:00 (CEST)
- INSEE/Postal code: 87031 /87500
- ^{1} French Land Register data, which excludes lakes, ponds, glaciers > 1 km^{2} (0.386 sq mi or 247 acres) and river estuaries.

Le Chalard (French pronunciation: [lə ʃalaʁ]; Occitan: Lu Chaslar) is a commune in the Haute-Vienne department in the Nouvelle-Aquitaine region in western France.

Inhabitants are known as Peyrouliers.

== See also ==
- Communes of the Haute-Vienne department

== Culture ==
- Festival 1001 Notes, music festival
