= Chanson de Jérusalem =

12th-century French epic poem

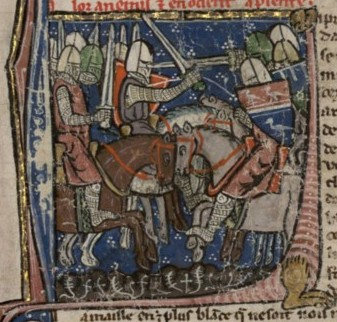
Siege of Jerusalem (1099)

Chanson de Jérusalem (or Song of Jerusalem) is a 12th century French epic poem celebrating the 1099 Siege of Jerusalem by Christian crusaders during the First Crusade. It was translated and incorporated into the prose Spanish Gran conquista de Ultramar.
