= Chanson d'Antioche =

French epic poem based on the first crusade

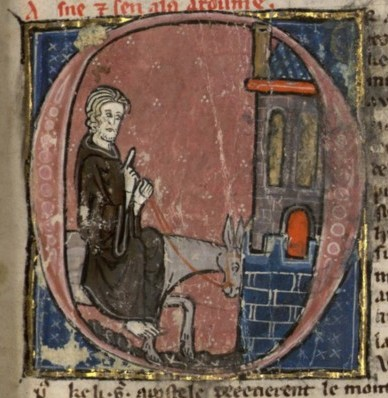
The arrival of Peter the Hermit in Rome

The Chanson d'Antioche is a chanson de geste in 9000 lines of Alexandrin in stanzas called laisses, now known in a version composed about 1180 for a courtly French audience and embedded in a quasi-historical cycle of epic poems inspired by the events of 1097–1099, the climax of the First Crusade: the conquest of Antioch and of Jerusalem and the origins of the Crusader states. The Chanson was later reworked and incorporated in an extended Crusade cycle, of the 14th century, which was far more fabulous and embroidered, more distinctly romance than epic.

The subject is the preaching of the First Crusade, the preparations for departure, the tearful goodbyes, the arrival at Constantinople and the siege of Antioch of 1097–1098.

The lost original poem was said to have been composed by an eye-witness, Richard le Pèlerin, (Richard the Pilgrim), a North French or Flemish jongleur, who began it partly on the spot, during the eight-month siege of Antioch. The oldest version now known was recast by Graindor de Douai, a contemporary of Louis VII of France. Graindor borrowed details from the chroniclers to make his work more lively and more accurate, for his object from the start was to tell the true praiseworthy tale, not cozen his listeners of their coin:

Seignor, oïés canchon, qui moult fait à loer
Par itel convenant la vos puis-je conter...
Je ne vous vorrai mie mensonges raconter
Ne fables, ne paroles pour vos deniers embler
Ains vous dirai canchon où il n'a hamender
Del barnage de Franche qui tant fait à loer!

Such claims of truth-telling are part of the poet's epic repertory. Hyperbole and epic lists are other major features in this chanson: the poet takes care to mention every knightly name that would cause a rustle of recognition among his hearers, in a tradition as old as Homer, with the result that the Chanson d'Antioche was taken as history by heralds and genealogists of a later generation. In some of its details it has won the admiration of modern historians (see links).

Crusade cycles had a wide medieval audience: free translations and versions of the Chanson d'Antioche appeared in Old Occitan, Spanish, English, Dutch, and German.

The Chanson d'Antioche was forgotten, until it was printed and published in 1848 by Alexis Paulin Paris, at the height of the Romantic Gothic Revival. The most recent edition is "The Chanson d'Antioch: An Old French Account of the French Crusade," translated by Susan Eddington and Carol Sweetenham. New York: Routledge, 2011.

== Bibliography ==
- Susan B. Edgington, "Albert of Aachen and the Chansons de Geste" in The Crusades and their sources: essays presented to Bernard Hamilton ed. John France, William G. Zajac (Aldershot: Ashgate, 1998) pp. 23–37.
- Susan B. Edgington, Carol Sweetenham, translators, The Chanson d'Antioche: an Old French account of the First Crusade. Farnham: Ashgate, 2011. ISBN 9780754654896.
- Lewis A. M. Sumberg, "La chanson d'Antioche", Paris, Picard, 1968.
- Sont cou ore les fems que jo voi la venir? Women in the Chanson d'Antioche. By Susan B. Edgington. In Gendering the Crusades. Edgington, Susan, and Lambert, Sarah. Columbia University Press, 2002.
- Siege of Antioch Project. Fordham University Center for Medieval Studies (2021).
