= List of châteaux in Limousin =

This is a list of châteaux in the former region of Limousin, France.

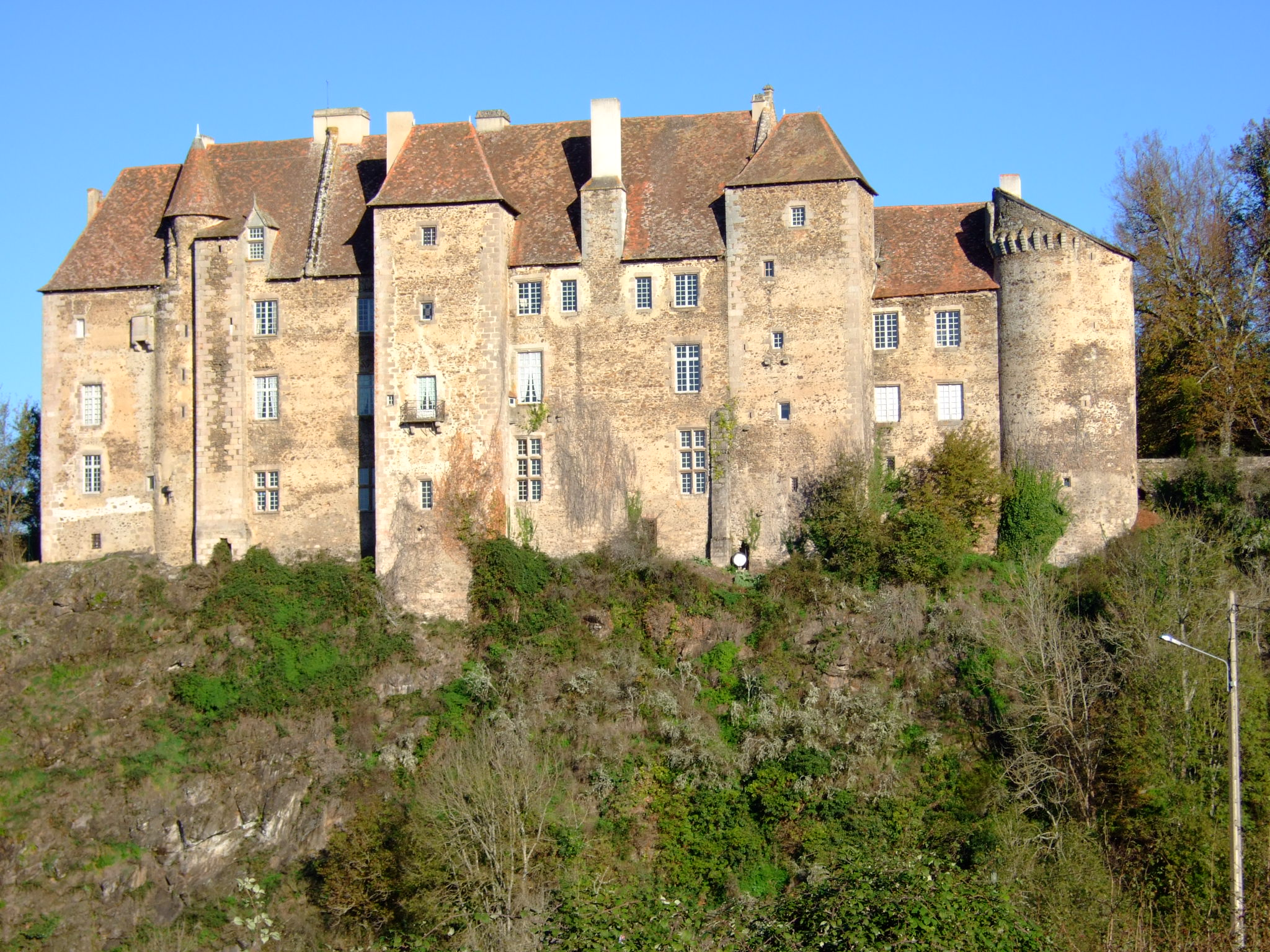
Château de Boussac

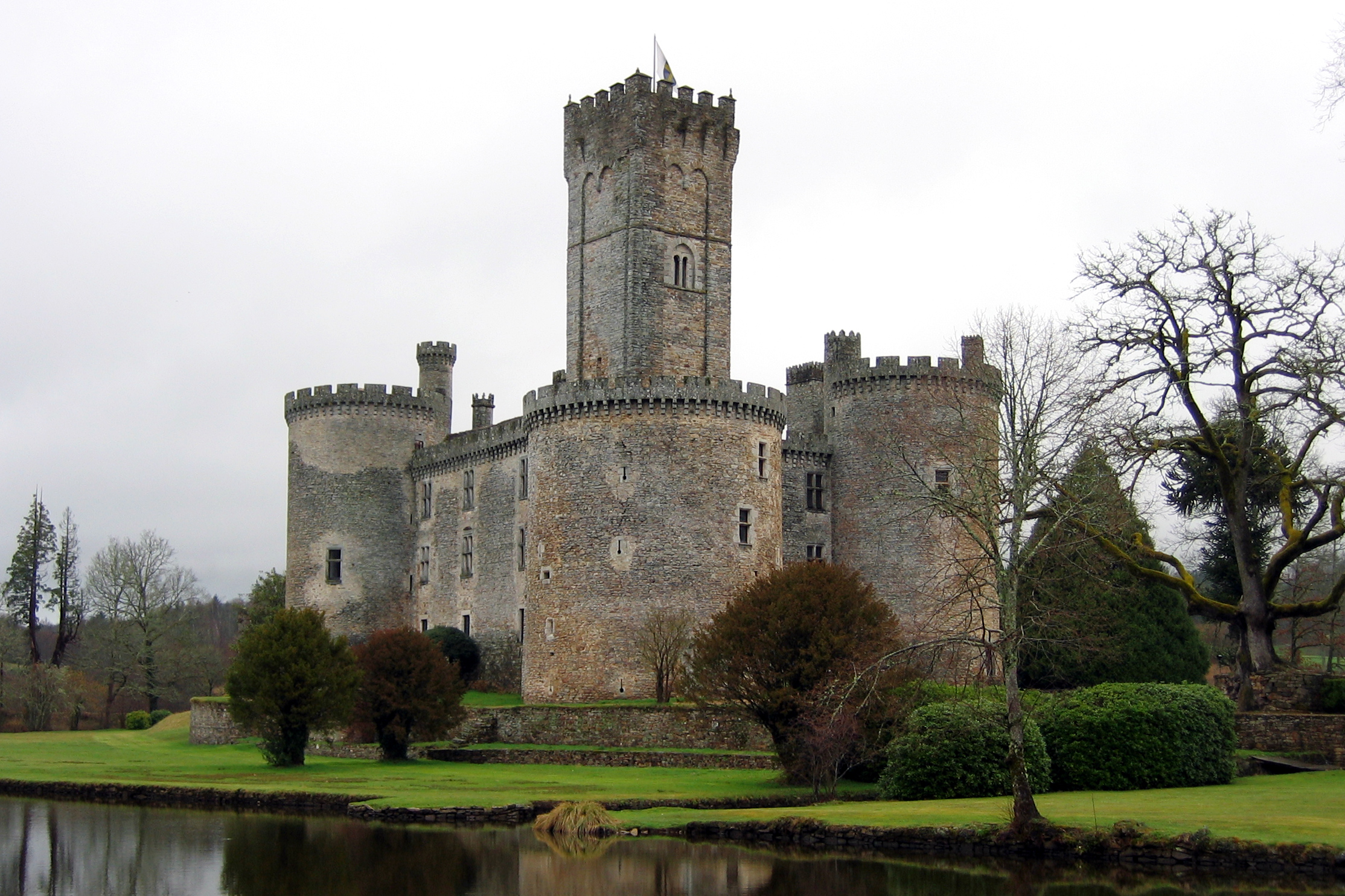
Château de Montbrun

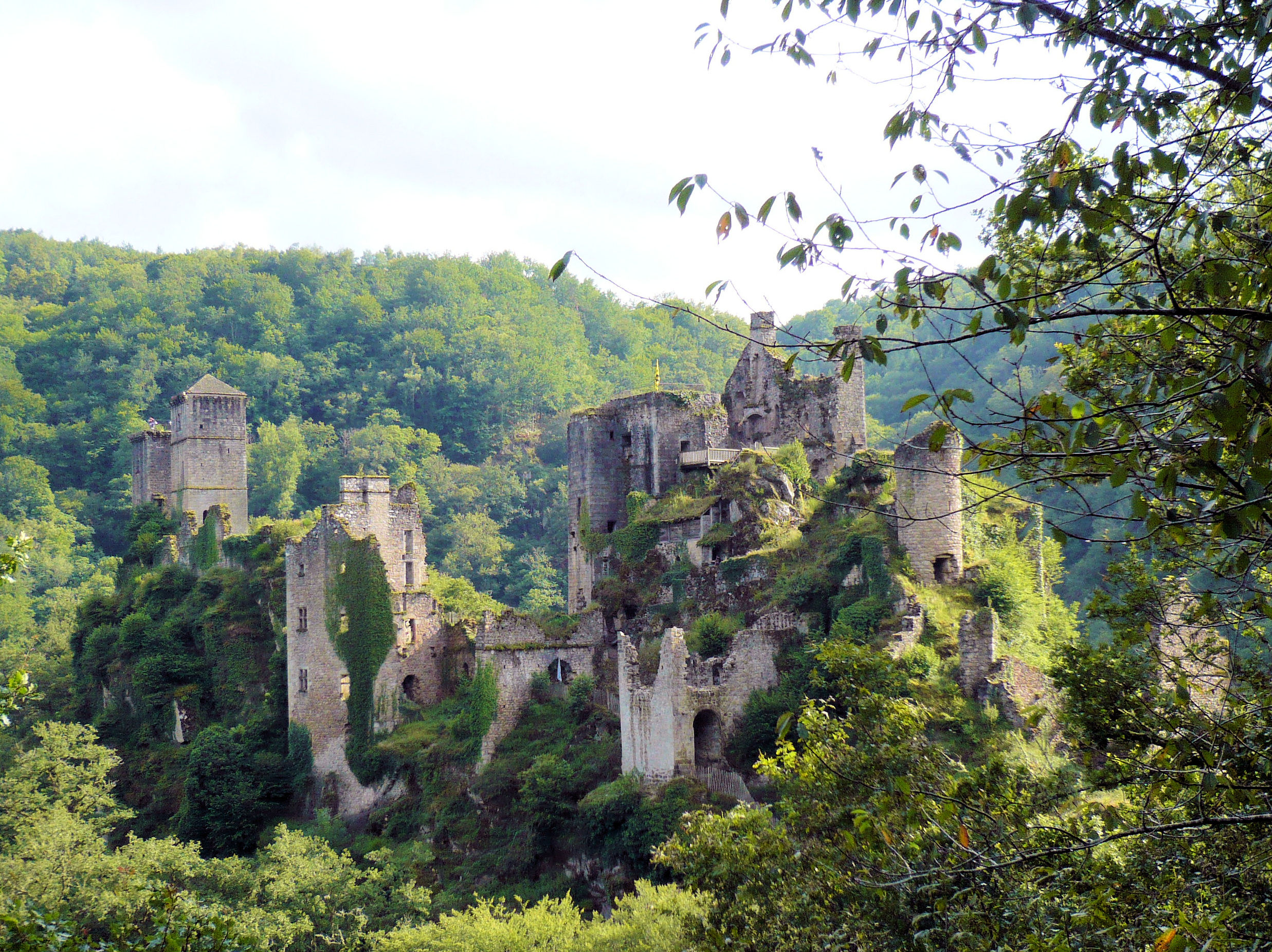
Tours de Merle

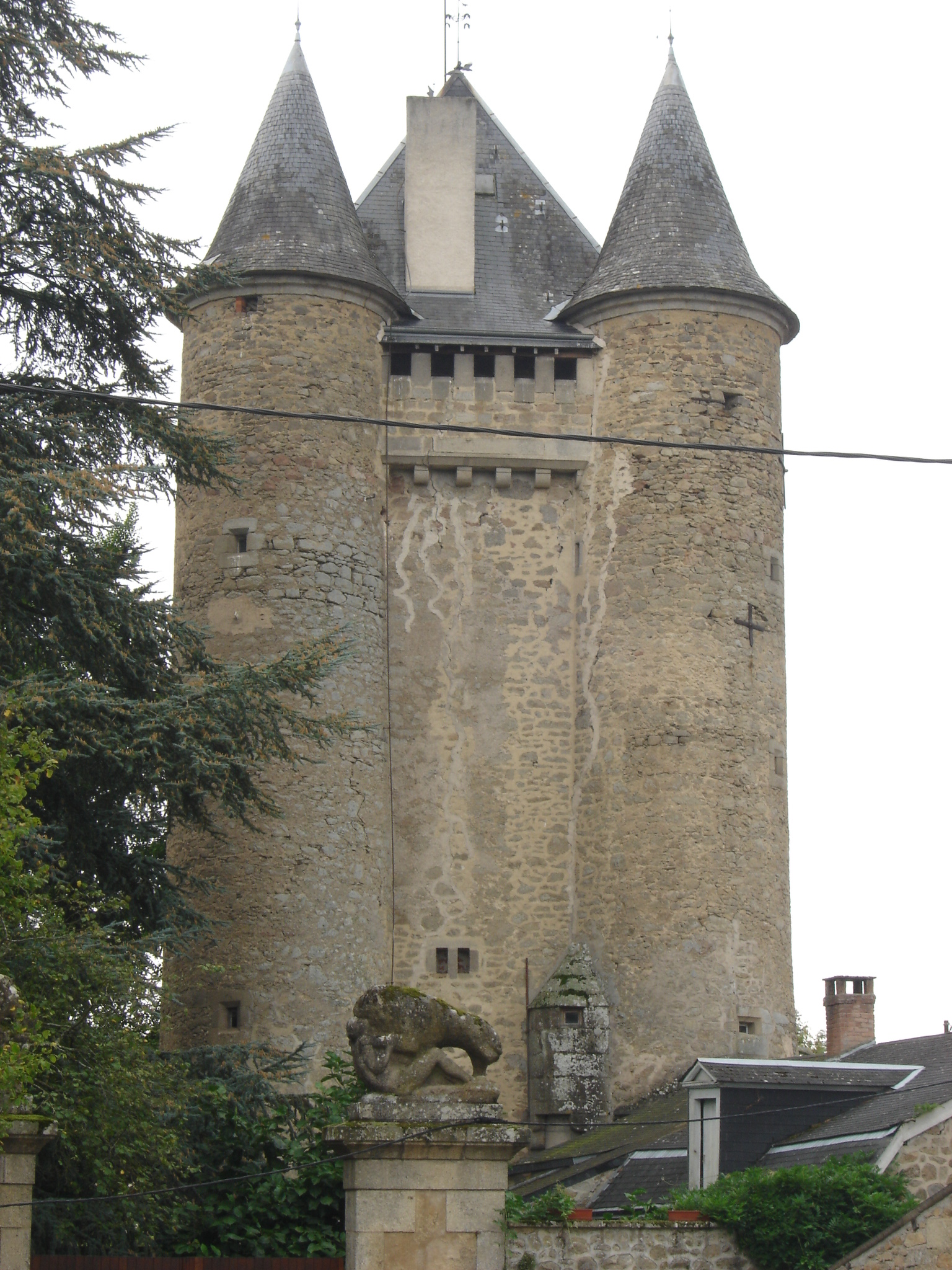
Le château de Jouillat

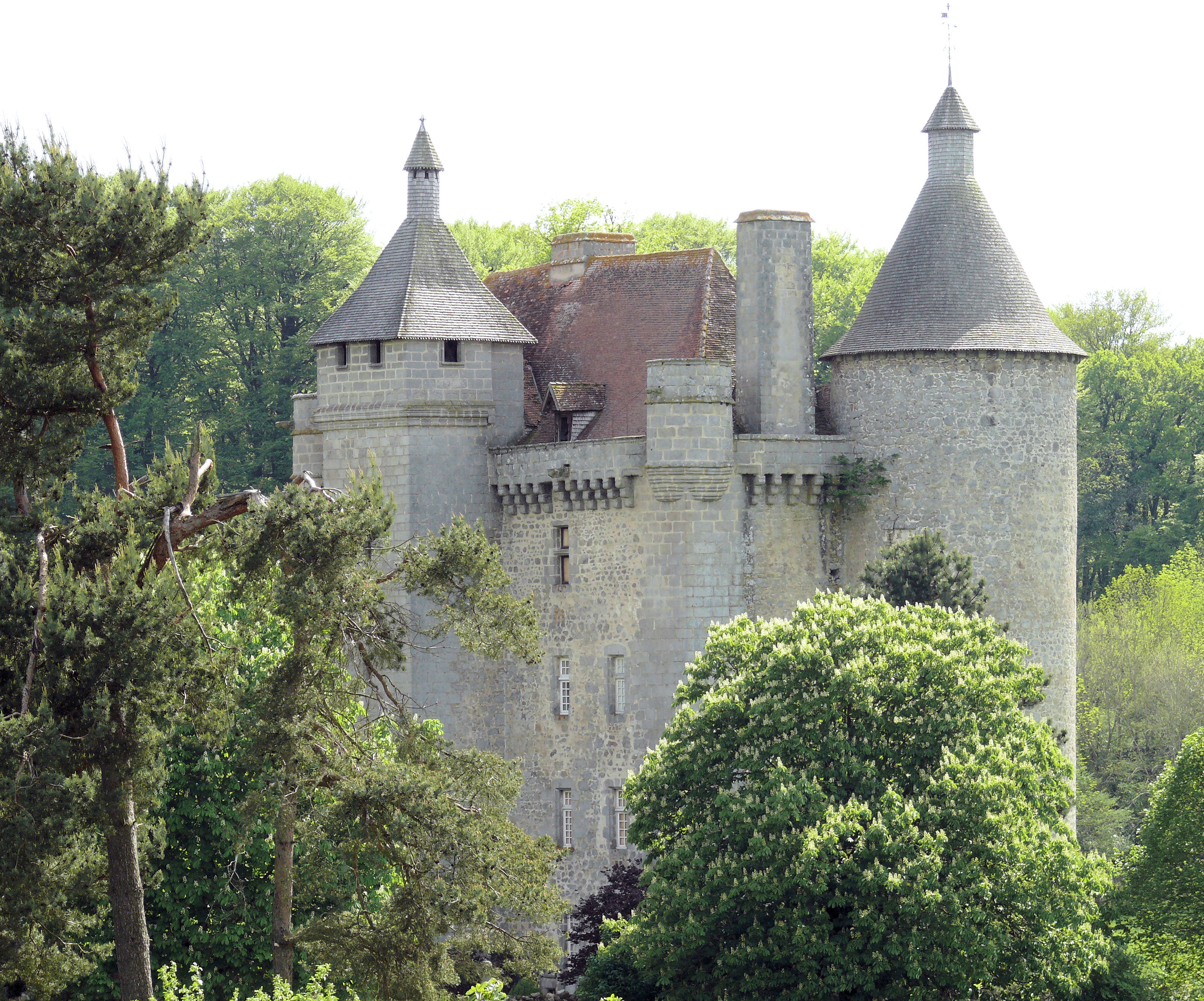
Château de Villemonteix

== Corrèze ==
- Château de Bity, Sarran. Owned by Jacques Chirac.
- Château La Borde, 15th century, rebuilt in 17th century, Ussel
- Château de Charlus-le-Pailhoux, Saint-Exupéry-les-Roches
- Château de Crocq, Crocq (ruined)
- Château de l'Ebraly, 15th century, Saint-Dezéry Ussel
- Château de la Gane, 15th to 16th century, Saint-Exupéry-les-Roches
- Château de la Johannie, Curemonte
- Château de Lespinasse, 15th to 17th century, La Tourette Ussel
- Tours de Merle, Saint-Geniez-ô-Merle
- Château de La Mothe, 15th to 16th century, Ussel
- Château de Saint-Germain-Lavolps, Saint-Germain-Lavolps
- Châteaux de Saint-Hilaire et des Plas, Curemonte
- Châteaux Les Salles, 17th century, Ussel
- Château de Sédières, Clergoux (fortified)
- Château de Servières, 13th century, Servières-le-Château. Owned by the Abbaye d'Aurillac.
- Château Le Theil, 15th century, Ussel
- Château de Turenne, Turenne (fortified)
- Château de Ventadour, Moustier-Ventadour (ruined)

== Creuse ==
- Château de Boussac, Boussac
- Château de Chantemille, Ahun
- Château de Crozant, Crozant
- Château d'Etangsannes, Saint-Chabrais
- Château de Jouillat, Jouillat
- Château de Mainsat, Mainsat
- Château de Malval, Malval
- Château du Mazeau, Peyrat-la-Nonière
- Château de Sainte-Feyre, Sainte-Feyre
- Château de Saint-Germain-Beaupré, Saint-Germain-Beaupré
- Château du Théret, La Saunière
- Château de Villemonteix, Saint-Pardoux-les-Cards

== Haute-Vienne ==
- Château d'Aixe (or "Tour Jeanne d'Albret"), 13th century, Aixe-sur-Vienne. Demolished at the beginning of the 19th century.
- Le Chateau Conyers, Chateauponsac, constructed circa 1723, monument historic
- La salle d'Arnac, Seigneurie Arnac-la-Poste
- Château des Barthon de Montbas, 17th century, Bellac
- Château de Bagnac, 19th century, Saint-Bonnet de Bellac
- Château de la Borie, Solignac
- Domaine de La Bouchie, Aixe-sur-Vienne
- Château de Brie, Champagnac-la-Rivière, Maison-forte du XVe siècle, visitable sous conditions
- Château du Bucheron, Bosmie-l'Aiguille
- Château des Cars, Cars (ruined, formerly fortified) visitable
- Château de Chalucet, Saint-Jean-Ligoure (ruined, formerly fortified), visitable
- Château de Châlus-Chabrol, Châlus (ruined, formerly fortified), visitable
- Château de Châlus Maulmont, Châlus (ruined, formerly fortified), visitable
- Château du Chambon, Bersac-sur-Rivalier, 15th to 18th century
- Château de La Chapelle, Saint-Léonard-de-Noblat
- Tour de Château-Chervix, Château-Chervix
- Châteaux de Cloud, Ambazac
- Château de Courbefy, Bussière-Galant (ruined, formerly fortified)
- Château de Coussac-Bonneval, Coussac-Bonneval, visitable
- Manoir de La Croix du Breuil, Bessines-sur-Gartempe
- Château de Cromières, Cussac
- Château des Ducs, Mortemart
- Château des Essarts, Beaune-les-Mines
- Château d'Eyjeaux, Eyjeaux
- Château de La Faugeras, Boisseuil
- Château de Faye, Flavignac, 18th century
- Château du Fraisse, Nouic
- Château de La Garenne, Boisseuil
- Château de Gigondas, Isle
- Château de Juvet, La Roche-l'Abeille
- Château de Lage-Ponnet, Bersac-sur-Rivalier
- Château de Lastours, Rilhac-Lastours (ruined, formerly fortified), visitable
- Château de Leychoisier, Bonnac-la-Côte
- Château de Leymarie, Beynac
- Tour de Lubignac, Arnac-la-Poste
- Château de Maillofray, Blond
- Château du Mas de l'Age, Couzeix
- Château du Mazeau, Rempnat
- Château de Monismes, 13th to 15th century, Bessines-sur-Gartempe (ruined)
- Château de Montagrier, Saint-Bonnet de Bellac
- Château de Montauran, Nantiat
- Château de Montbrun, Dournazac (fortified), visitable
- Château du Monteil, Arnac-la-Poste
- Château de Montmagner, Arnac-la-Poste
- Château de Montméry, 19th century, Ambazac
- Château de Nexon, Nexon
- Château de Nieul, Nieul
- Château d'Oreix, Arnac-la-Poste
- Manoir de l'Osmonerie, 17th and 18th centuries, Aixe-sur-Vienne
- Manoir du Puy-Martin, Blanzac
- Château de Puy-Mesnil, Azat-le-Ris
- Château de Ris-Chauveron, keep 14th century, château 19th century, Azat-le-Ris
- Château de La Rivière-aux-Seigneurs, Augne
- Château de Rochechouart, Rochechouart, visitable
- Château de La Ronze, Blond
- Château de Salvanet, Saint-Priest-Taurion
- Château de Teillet, Bonnac-la-Côte
- Châteaux de Trasforêt, Ambazac
- Château de Traslage, Vicq-sur-Breuilh
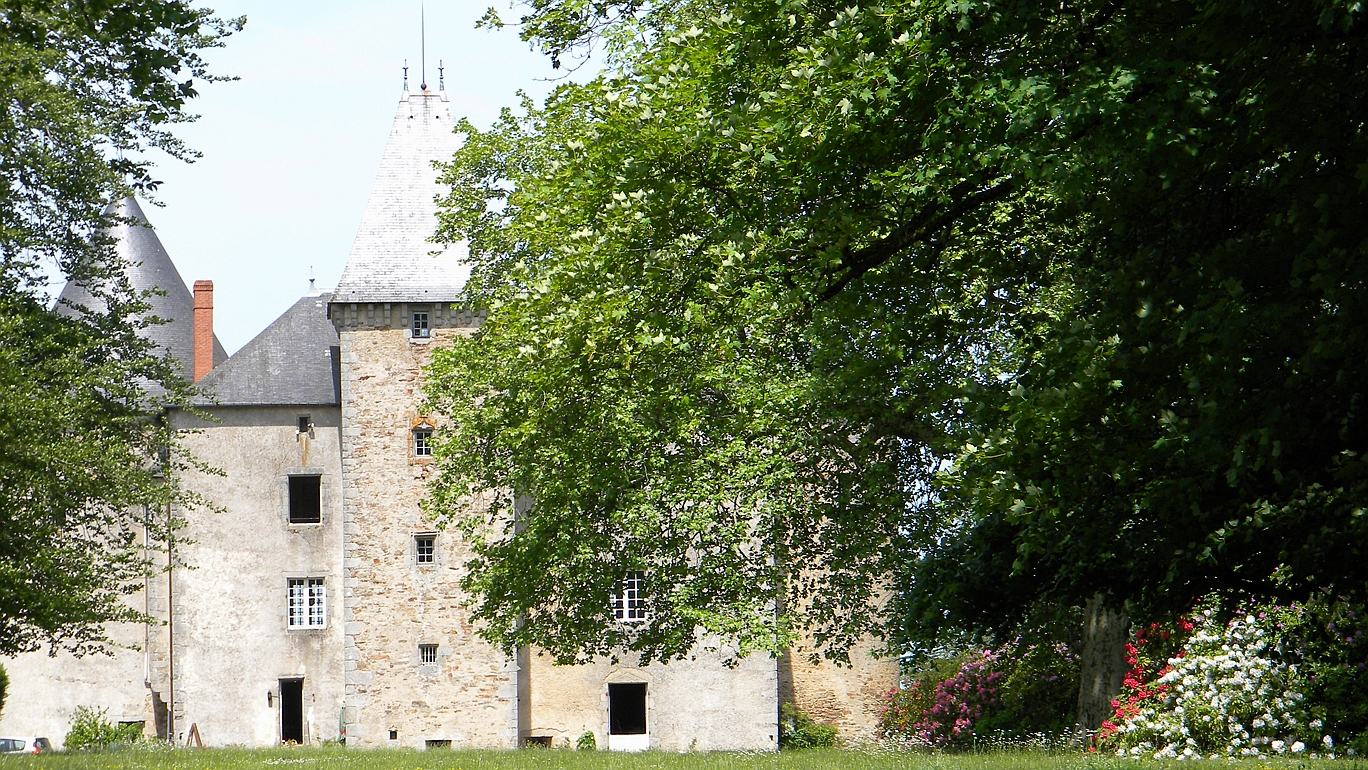
- Château de Brie 87150, Champagnac-la-Rivière
  Château de Vauguenige, Saint Pardoux

== See also ==
- List of castles in France
