= Canton of Chénérailles =

Coordinates: 46°05′10″N 2°11′50″E

Chénérailles
- Former canton
- Interactive map of Chénérailles
- Country: France
- Region: Nouvelle-Aquitaine
- Department: Creuse
- No. of communes: {{{nbcomm}}}
- Disbanded: 2015
- Area: 223.56 km^{2} (86.32 sq mi)
- Population (2012): 4,046
  - Density: 18.10/km^{2} (46.87/sq mi)

The Canton of Chénérailles is a former canton situated in the Creuse département and in the Limousin region of central France. It was disbanded following the French canton reorganisation which came into effect in March 2015. It had 4,046 inhabitants (2012).

== Geography ==
A farming area, with the town of Chénérailles, in the arrondissement of Aubusson, at its centre. The altitude varies from 366 m (1,201 ft) (Lavaveix-les-Mines) to 616 m (2,021 ft) (Puy-Malsignat) with an average altitude of 486 m (1,594 ft).

The canton comprised 11 communes:

- Le Chauchet
- Chénérailles
- Issoudun-Létrieix
- Lavaveix-les-Mines
- Peyrat-la-Nonière
- Puy-Malsignat
- La Serre-Bussière-Vieille
- Saint-Chabrais
- Saint-Dizier-la-Tour
- Saint-Médard-la-Rochette
- Saint-Pardoux-les-Cards

== Population ==
Historical population Canton of Chénérailles
| Year | 1962 | 1968 | 1975 | 1982 | 1990 | 1999 |
| Pop. | 5,546 | 6,059 | 5,349 | 4,883 | 4,557 | 4,250 |
| ±% | — | +9.2% | −11.7% | −8.7% | −6.7% | −6.7% |
From the year 1962 on: No double counting – residents of multiple communes (e.g. students and military personnel) are counted only once. Source: INSEE

== See also ==
- Arrondissements of the Creuse department
- Cantons of the Creuse department
- Communes of the Creuse department
