= Communauté de communes de Chénérailles =

Coordinates: 46.1132°N 2.1745°E

Chénérailles
- Former communauté de communes
- Interactive map of Chénérailles
- Country: France
- Region: Nouvelle-Aquitaine
- Department: Creuse
- No. of communes: {{{nbcomm}}}
- Established: 2002
- Disbanded: 2017
- Population (1999): 4,330

The communauté de communes de Chénérailles (Community of communes of Chénérailles) was located in the Creuse département of the Limousin region of central France. It was created in January 2002. It was merged into the new Communauté de communes Marche et Combraille en Aquitaine in January 2017.

It comprised the following 10 communes:

- Le Chauchet
- Chénérailles
- Issoudun-Létrieix
- Lavaveix-les-Mines
- Peyrat-la-Nonière
- Puy-Malsignat
- Saint-Chabrais
- Saint-Dizier-la-Tour
- Saint-Médard-la-Rochette
- Saint-Pardoux-les-Cards
