= List of castles in Limousin =

This list of castles in Limousin is a list of medieval castles or château forts in the region in southern France.

Links in italics are links to articles in the French Wikipedia.

== Corrèze ==
Name	Date	Condition	Image	Ownership / Access	Notes
Château de Crocq	12th century	Ruins			
Château de Saint-Hilaire, Château des Plas	13-17th century	Intact			Two adjacent châteaux, which dominate the commune of Curemonte.
Château de la Johannie	11-15th century				A third castle in the commune of Curemonte.
Tours de Merle	12-15th century	Ruins			
Château de Turenne		Ruins			
Château de Ventadour	11-15th century	Fragmentary remains			

== Creuse ==
Name	Date	Condition	Image	Ownership / Access	Notes
Château de Boussac	15th century	Intact			Altered 16-18th centuries, George Sand stayed there.
Château de Crozant	13th century	Ruins			
Château de Jouillat	14-15th century	Restored			Restored 19th century.
Château de Malval	14th century	Ruins			
Château de Pontarion	15th century	Part ruined			
Château de Saint-Germain-Beaupré	16th century	Rebuilt			

== Haute-Vienne ==
Name	Date	Condition	Image	Ownership / Access	Notes
Château de Brie		Intact		Private	
Château de Châlucet	12th century	Ruins			
Château de Châlus-Chabrol	11-13th century	Ruins			
Château de Châlus Maulmont	13th century	Ruins			
Tour de Château-Chervix	12th century	Ruins			
Château de Coussac-Bonneval	15th century	Rebuilt			Remodelled 18th century.
Château de Lastours	12-15th century	Ruins			
Château de Monismes	13-15th century	Ruins			
Château de Montbrun	12-15th century	Restored		Hotel	Restored 19th century.
Château de Rochechouart	12-15th century	Rebuilt			Remodelled in French Renaissance style

== See also ==
- List of castles in France
- List of châteaux in France
