= Albert Crumeyrolle =

French mathematician (1919–1992)

- Born: 10 December 1919; Curemonte, Corrèze, France
- Died: 17 June 1992 (aged 72); Toulouse, France
- Known for: major contributions to the study of Clifford algebras, in particular spinor structures and symplectic Clifford algebra
- Scientific career
- Fields: Mathematics
- Academic advisors: André Lichnerowicz

Albert J. Crumeyrolle (1919–1992) was a French mathematician and professor of mathematics at the Paul Sabatier University, known for his contributions to spinor structures and Clifford algebra.

== Work ==
Crumeyrolle was a student of André Lichnerowicz under whose supervision he completed a thesis in 1961.

His first important paper after completing his doctorate addressed spinor structures using methods of Clifford algebras developed by Claude Chevalley.

Crumeyrolle is known for his major contributions to theories of Clifford algebras and spinor structures. In 1975 he laid the foundations for symplectic Clifford algebra and the symplectic spinor. An earlier publication by two other authors, Nouazé and Revoy, had appeared three years before in which Weyl algebras were treated from a Cliffordian point of view. Crumeyrolle however drew more attention to the topic, and, as emphasized by Jacques Helmstetter, he contributed original ideas of his own. His work on symplectic Clifford algebras however came under serious critique on mathematical grounds.

The mathematician Artibano Micali recalled Crumeyrolle stating that periodicity of Clifford algebras should play a similar role for elementary particle physics as the periodic classification of elements by Dmitri Mendeleev has played for the periodic table of elements.

Crumeyrolle taught in Iran in 1966, in several Europe countries and, in 1973, at Stanford University summer school.

== Publications ==
=== Books ===
- Orthogonal and symplectic Clifford algebras: Spinor Structures, 1990
- Albert Crumeyrolle & J. Grifone: Symplectic geometry, Pitman Advanced Publishing Program, 1983
- Algèbres de Clifford et spineurs, 1974
- Bases géométriques de la topologie algébrique, 1970
- Compléments d'algèbre moderne, 1969
- Notions fondamentales d'algèbre moderne, 1967
