= Bitty =

Bitty may refer to:

- Bitty McLean (born 1972), British reggae, lovers rock and ragga singer
- Bitty Schram (born 1968), American actress
- Eric "Bitty" Bittle, protagonist of the webcomic Check, Please!

== See also ==
- Bitti, an Italian comune
- Bitti (name), a list of people with the surname or given name
- Tendai Biti (born 1966), Zimbabwean politician, Minister of Finance from 2009 to 2013
- Château de Bity, France
