= Bitti (name) =

Bitti may refer to the following people:

- Bernardo Bitti (1548–1610), Italian Jesuit priest and painter
- Davide Ricci Bitti (born 1984), Italian cyclist
- Francesco Ricci Bitti (born 1942), Italian former tennis player and President of the International Tennis Federation from 1999 to 2015
- Satwinder Bitti (born 1975), Punjabi singer
- Bitti Deva, birth name of Vishnuvardhana (reigned 1108–1152), a king of the Hoysala Empire
- Bitti Mohanty, Indian convicted rapist and fugitive

== See also ==
- Tendai Biti (born 1966), Zimbabwean politician, Minister of Finance from 2009 to 2013
- Bitty
