= Musée du Président Jacques Chirac =

Museum in Sarran, France

Coordinates: 45.408305°N 1.93995°E

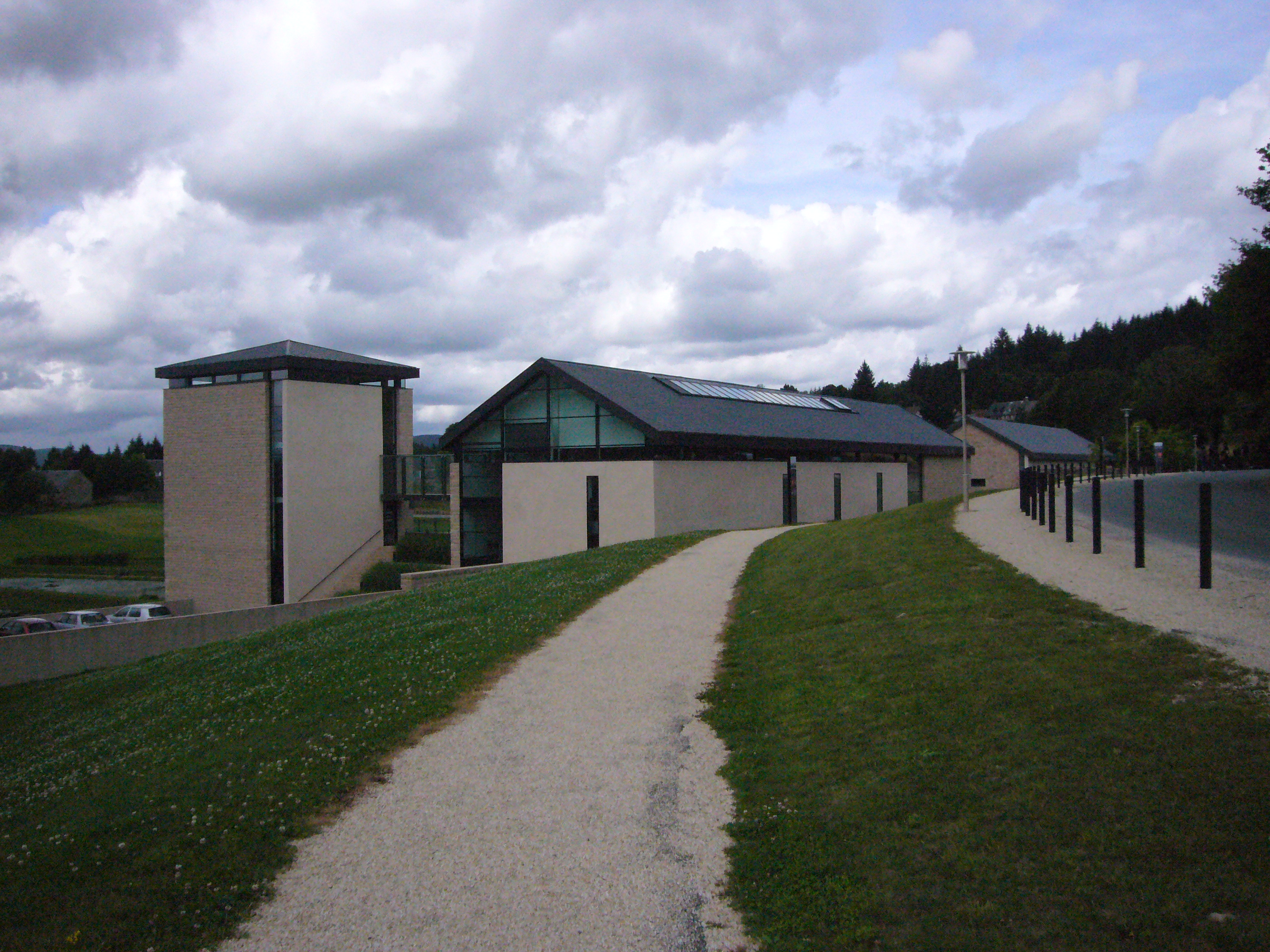
Musée du Président Jacques Chirac

The musée du Président Jacques Chirac (President Jacques Chirac museum), commonly known as musée du Septennat, is a museum located in Sarran, in the French departement of Corrèze, in the Massif central, 30 km northeast of the city of Tulle. It houses the collection of objects offered to Jacques Chirac during his presidency, a library, as well as a space for temporary exhibitions. It was opened on December 15, 2000 by Chirac.

The building was designed by Jean-Michel Wilmotte.

== See also ==
- Presidential library system, for presidential museums in the United States.

== Sources ==
- Translation of the French Wikipedia article
