= Arnac-la-Poste =

- Commune
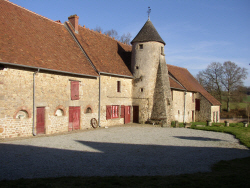
- The Montmagner post house
- Location of Arnac-la-Poste
- Location within France Location within Nouvelle-Aquitaine
- Coordinates: 46°16′39″N 1°22′29″E
- Country: France
- Region: Nouvelle-Aquitaine
- Department: Haute-Vienne
- Arrondissement: Bellac
- Canton: Châteauponsac
- Intercommunality: CC Haut-Limousin en Marche

Government
  - Mayor (2020–2026): Sophie Drieux
- Area^{1}: 46.62 km^{2} (18.00 sq mi)
- Highest elevation: 384 m (1,260 ft)
- Lowest elevation: 249 m (817 ft)
- Population (2023): 902
  - Density: 19.3/km^{2} (50.1/sq mi)
- Time zone: UTC+01:00 (CET)
  - Summer (DST): UTC+02:00 (CEST)
- INSEE/Postal code: 87003 /87160
- ^{1} French Land Register data, which excludes lakes, ponds, glaciers > 1 km^{2} (0.386 sq mi or 247 acres) and river estuaries.

Arnac-la-Poste (French pronunciation: [aʁnak la pɔst]; Occitan: Arnac) is a commune in the Haute-Vienne department in the Nouvelle-Aquitaine region in western France.

== Geography ==
The river Benaize forms part of the commune's northern border. The river Brame flows westward through the commune's southern part.

== See also ==
- Communes of the Haute-Vienne department
