= Château de Turenne =

Ruined castle in Turenne, France

Coordinates: 45°3′20″N 1°35′1″E

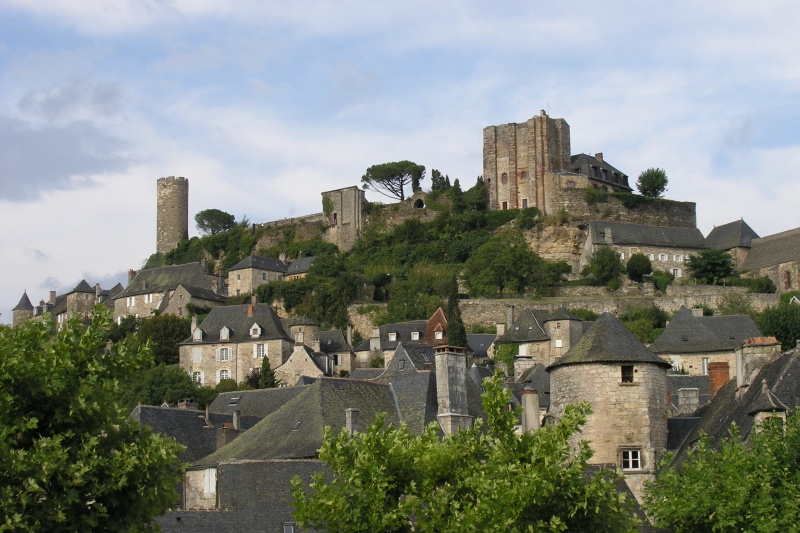
View of Turenne in 2005

The Château de Turenne is a ruined castle in Turenne, Corrèze département of France. It is a listed monument.

== See also ==
- List of castles in France
