= Château de Bity =

Château in Nouvelle-Aquitaine, France

Coordinates: 45.4169°N 1.9211°E

- Interactive map of the Château de Bity area

The Château de Bity (French pronunciation: [ʃato də biti]) is a château in Sarran, Corrèze, Nouvelle-Aquitaine, France.

== History ==
The château was re-built in the 17th century after it burned down in 1579.

In 1925, it was acquired by William Noel Lucas-Shadwell, a British intelligence officer. In 1934–1935, he invited Leon Trotsky to the castle.

During World War II, it was a hiding place for members of the French Resistance, and later served as a hospital.

In 1969, it was acquired by Jacques Chirac, who went on to serve as president of France from 1995 to 2007. He invited then president of China Jiang Zemin to the castle in October 1999. In July 2012, he hosted François Hollande, who was the current French president.

== Architectural significance ==
The château was listed as an official monument in 1969.
