= Bitti Mohanty =

Indian rapist (died 2024)

Bitty Mohanty
- Born: Bitihotra Mohanty
- Died: 11 August 2024; Bhubaneswar, Odisha, India
- Other names: Bitti, Bitty, Raghav Rajan
- Occupation: Employee
- Years active: 2006–2024
- Known for: Rape of German national

Bitihotra "Bitti" Mohanty (died 11 August 2024) was an Indian computer engineer and convict sentenced to seven years' imprisonment for raping a German tourist at Alwar, India. After being released on parole to visit his ailing mother at Cuttack, Orissa, on 20 November 2006, he absconded from custody. He was arrested again from Kannur in Kerala, on Saturday, 9 March 2013.

His case was one of the quickest rape trials conducted by a fast-track court; the trial was completed within 15 days of lodging the complaint. The parole was granted within 8 months of his conviction. His father, Bidya Bhushan Mohanty (B.B. Mohanty), an Indian Police Service (IPS) officer, stood as surety for his son's 15-day parole and was subsequently suspended and arrested on the charges of helping, hiding and harbouring his son. He was later reinstated into the service in 2009 and retired in 2012. Six years after his son's disappearance, the father expressed ignorance about his son's whereabouts and asserted that his son did not commit any major crime.

A.S. Gill (the Director General of Police of Rajasthan) and B.B. Mohanty were batchmates, and it was alleged that the investigation was slowed down due to intervention of high-ranking officials. The investigating parole officer was transferred abruptly on 29 May 2007, and this hampered a speedy investigation.

== Father ==
Bitti Mohanty's father, an Indian Police Service officer, had petitioned the National Human Rights Commission and the Rajasthan State Human Rights Commission, stating his son needed urgent medical treatment and should not be arrested. He established he found out about his son's ill health through communication with other inmates. The convict's father also argued that the victim and his son were intimate and had been living together. Bitti was the elder of two children of Mr. and Mrs. Mohanty.

== Disappearance ==
Mohanty was charged with raping of a German national on 21 March 2006. The German lady and Bitti Mohanty were on a holiday in Rajasthan and took a hotel room at Alwar on 20 March 2006. He was convicted on 12 April 2006 by a fast-track court and police from Odisha and Rajasthan failed to find him there.

Chief Minister of Rajasthan assured that police were trying to trace Bitti Mohanty by forming special teams, as he was considered a high-profile convict. However, after seven years of the convict's disappearance, the Rajasthani government stated that it had done all that was possible to arrest Bitti Mohanty.

== Arrest ==
Mohanty was arrested from Kannur in Kerala, 9 March 2013. Police got information of Bitti by an anonymous letter received by the bank branch authorities where he was working as Raghav Rajan from Andhra Pradesh, suspecting that the man may be Bitti. His photo was shown on television and Internet among the pictures of accused sex offenders, which helped to identify him. He was working in a bank under the false name of Raghav Rajan.

== Death ==
Mohanty died on 11 August 2024 while undergoing treatment for stomach cancer at AIIMS Bhubaneswar.
