= Blond, Haute-Vienne =

Blond
- Commune
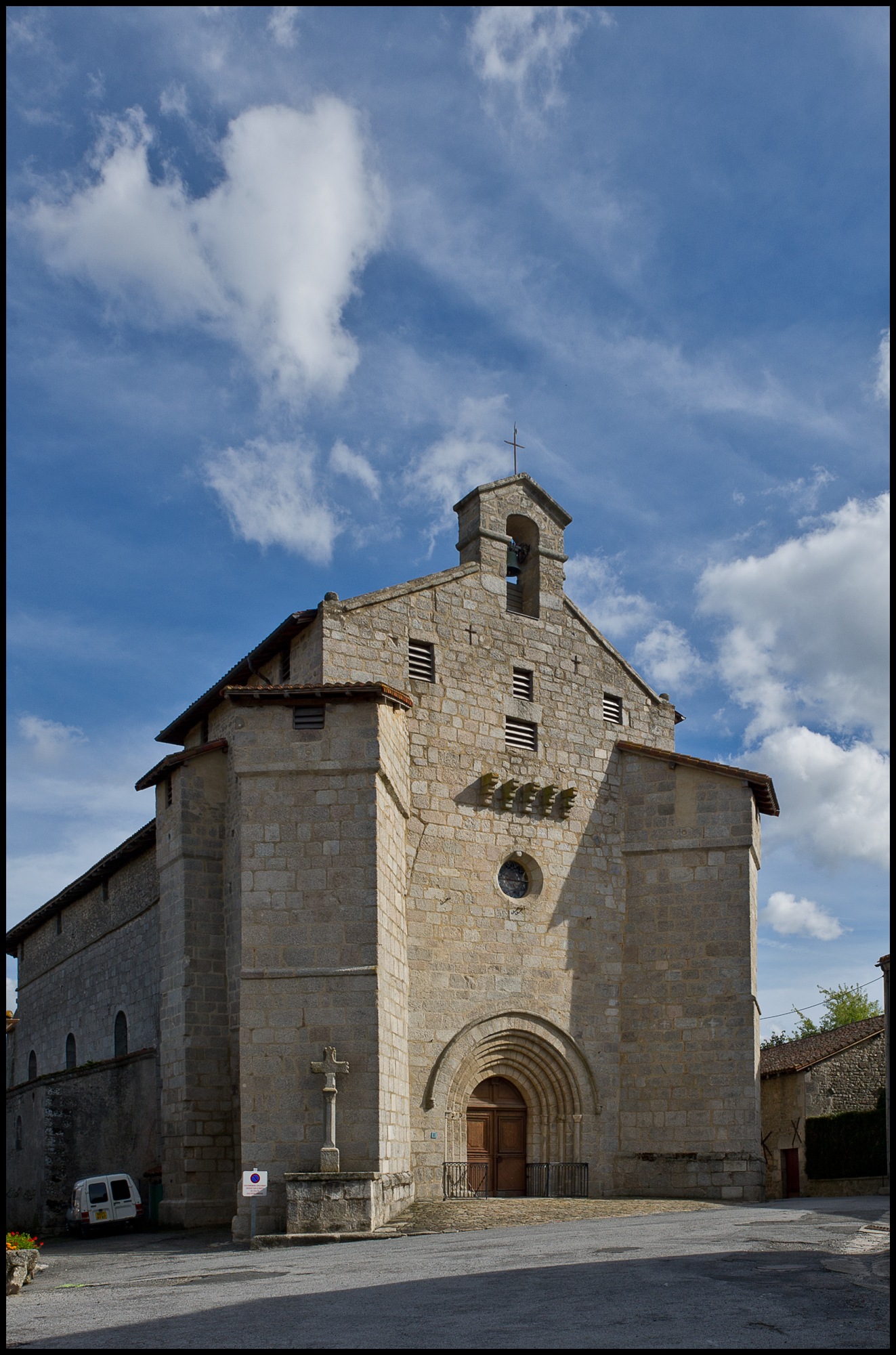
- Fortified Church in Blond, Haute-Vienne

- Coat of arms
- Location of Blond
- Location within France Location within Nouvelle-Aquitaine
- Coordinates: 46°02′44″N 1°01′09″E
- Country: France
- Region: Nouvelle-Aquitaine
- Department: Haute-Vienne
- Arrondissement: Bellac
- Canton: Bellac
- Intercommunality: Haut-Limousin en Marche

Government
  - Mayor (2020–2026): Jean-François Perrin
- Area^{1}: 64.69 km^{2} (24.98 sq mi)
- Elevation: 302 m (991 ft)
- Highest elevation: 514 m (1,686 ft)
- Lowest elevation: 194 m (636 ft)
- Population (2023): 674
  - Density: 10.4/km^{2} (27.0/sq mi)
- Time zone: UTC+01:00 (CET)
  - Summer (DST): UTC+02:00 (CEST)
- INSEE/Postal code: 87018 /87300
- ^{1} French Land Register data, which excludes lakes, ponds, glaciers > 1 km^{2} (0.386 sq mi or 247 acres) and river estuaries.

Blond (French pronunciation: [blɔ̃]; Occitan: Blom) is a commune in the Haute-Vienne department in the Nouvelle-Aquitaine region in western France.

== See also ==
- Communes of the Haute-Vienne department
