= Châteaux de Saint-Hilaire et des Plas =

Two historic castles in Nouvelle-Aquitaine, France

Coordinates: 45.0011°N 1.7428°E

Château des Plas
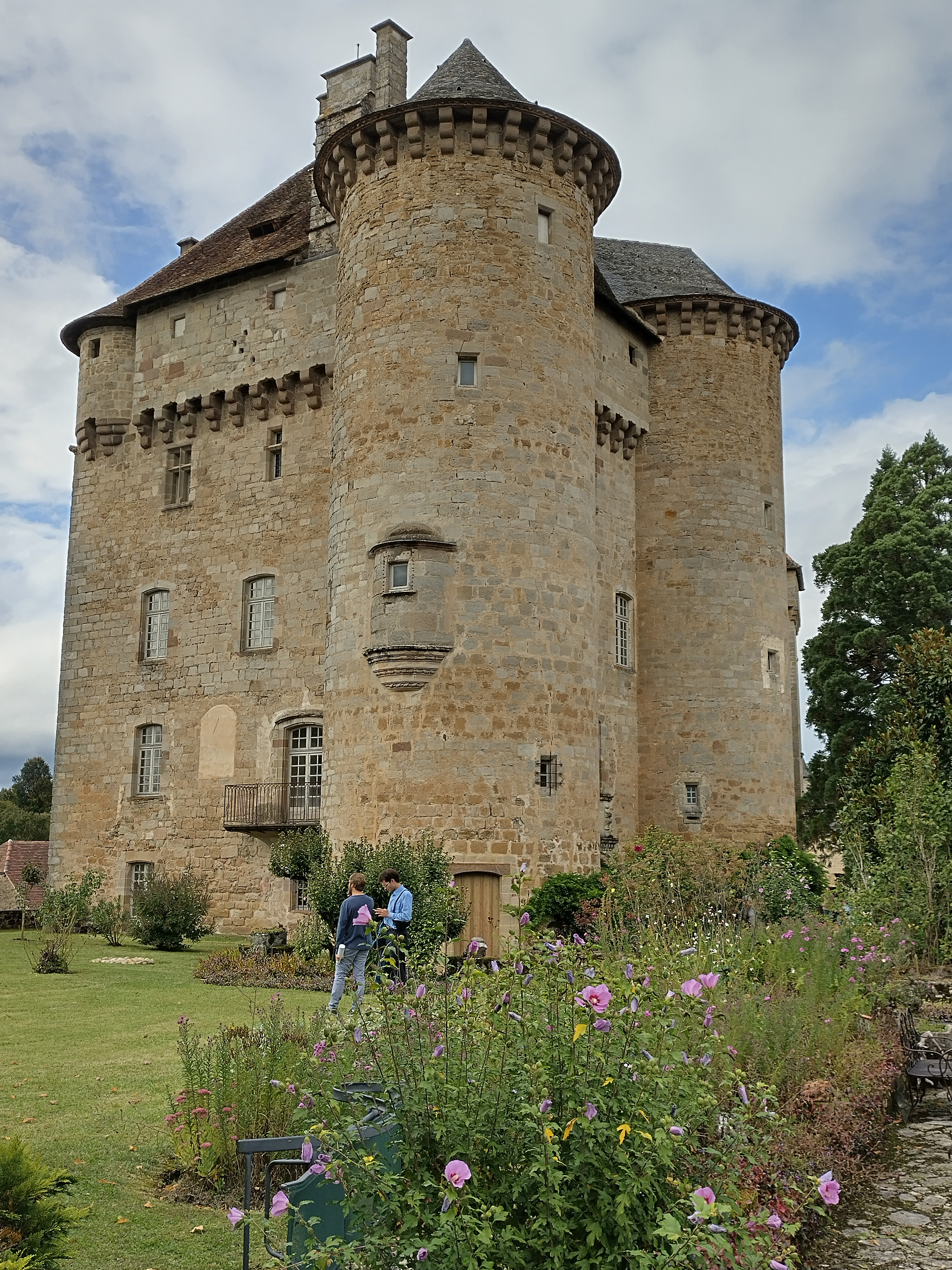
- Interactive map of the Château des Plas area

The Châteaux de Saint-Hilaire et des Plas are two historic castles in Curemonte, Corrèze, Nouvelle-Aquitaine, France. The Château de Saint-Hilaire, in the centre, was built in the 13th century. The Château des Plas, which surrounds it, was built in the 16th century.

== History ==
There are no evidence or records of previous fortifications at Curemonte prior to the first castle built in the 13th century, though historical documents do record the names of owners of the area during the 11th century, in the Cartulaire de Beaulieu in 1073 and during the crusades of 1096.

Chateaux Saint-Hillaire's construction appears to have started as a keep, now the south-west tower with a circular tower attached for a staircase. This circular tower disappeared at the end of the 1400s. A family called the Aymars owned it up until the 16th century. In the mid 1500s a Gabriel de Cardaillac from a Quercy family in Figeac along with his wife Anne de Plas, was now the lord of the Chateau.

Jean de Plas, brother of Anne, built the Chateaux Plas next to Chateau Saint-Hillaire starting in 1543 and completing it in 1547. A process of co-lordship had taken place at Curemonte. Jean de Plas, was an ecclesiastical lawyer who had graduated from the Sorbonne, became French ambassador to Scotland during the reigns of Louis XII and Francis I. He was later bishop of Perigueux and later Bazas. By the mid-1600s, the Plas family now owned both castles and Château de la Johannie, close by.

The owners survived the French Revolution and in 1825, the last owner, a Marquess left Curemonte to live with her only daughter, the Marquess de Bony de Levergne in the Haute Vienne. In 1830, the two castles were sold for 30-40 million Francs after being inherited by another daughter, the Marquess de Lauris, using the money to maintain an estate in Berry. It was bought by the Dunoyer de Segonzac family of Vegennes, mainly for the land that came with two castles, never living in the town.

In 1875, the barbican, which stood where war memorial is today, was demolished after it and 12 acres of area was expropriated by the municipality for roads and a town square. The building that connected the two castles was demolished by the owners and at the beginning of the 20th century, the a fire broke out in Chateaux de Sainte Hillarie with only two square towers remaining untouched and stood without a roof for sixty years. Thirty years after the fire, a staircase tower at Chateau Plas collapsed causing a collapse in the main building.

It was later owned by the Delords family, but the last owner ran out of money due to financial problems. The last Delord, with no heirs sold the two castles to the Jouvenel family in exchange for another house and life annuity. The exchange took place in 1912, owned by Robert de Jouvenel until he died 1924, though he never lived in the two chateaus. His brother, Henri de Jouvenel inherited the two castles owning them until his death in 1935. Married to the French writer Colette, it was inherited from him, after a legal dispute, by their daughter also known as Colette de Jouvenel or Bel-Gazou.

Colette herself would spend time in Curemonte in 1940 where her daughter Colette lived and where the latter was involved with resistance activities during the occupation of France in World War 2, leaving in Curemonte in 1945. The daughter sold the two castles in 1949.

It was then owned and occupied by the reclusive Rochespierre's until 1972, but two castles were already in a dilapidated state with little or no renovations having been carried out since before the revolution due to the lack of income from the estate. The Cantegreil family then purchased the two castles and renovation work began to restore them to what they appear like today. Collapsed walls were rebuilt, windows unbricked and roof restored.

== Architectural significance ==
They have been listed as an official monument since 1991.
