= Puy-Malsignat =

Commune in Nouvelle-Aquitaine, France

- Commune
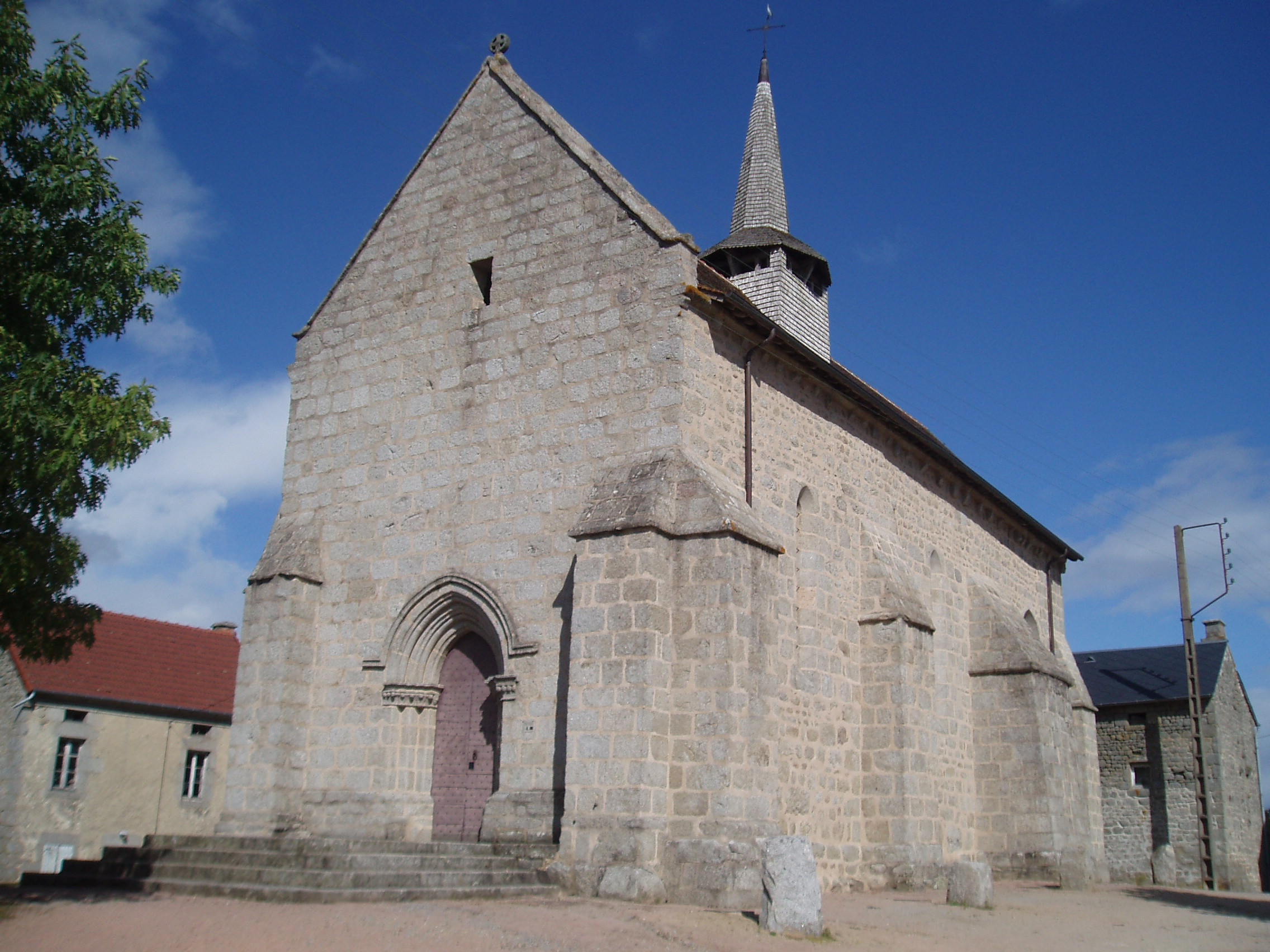
- The church of Saint-Thomas de Cantorbéry, in Puy-Malsignat

- Coat of arms
- Location of Puy-Malsignat
- Location within France Location within Nouvelle-Aquitaine
- Coordinates: 46°02′20″N 2°13′09″E
- Country: France
- Region: Nouvelle-Aquitaine
- Department: Creuse
- Arrondissement: Aubusson
- Canton: Gouzon
- Intercommunality: CC Marche et Combraille en Aquitaine

Government
  - Mayor (2020–2026): Félix Berger
- Area^{1}: 12.61 km^{2} (4.87 sq mi)
- Elevation: 615 m (2,018 ft)
- Highest elevation: 616 m (2,021 ft)
- Lowest elevation: 496 m (1,627 ft)
- Population (2023): 140
  - Density: 11/km^{2} (29/sq mi)
- Time zone: UTC+01:00 (CET)
  - Summer (DST): UTC+02:00 (CEST)
- INSEE/Postal code: 23159 /23130
- ^{1} French Land Register data, which excludes lakes, ponds, glaciers > 1 km^{2} (0.386 sq mi or 247 acres) and river estuaries.

Puy-Malsignat (French pronunciation: [pɥi malsiɲa]; Occitan: Pueg Malsinhac) is a commune in the Creuse department in the Nouvelle-Aquitaine region in central France.

== Geography ==
An area of farming, lakes and streams comprising the village and a few hamlets some 7 miles (11 km) north of Aubusson, between the D9 and the D990 roads.

The Voueize forms part of the commune's eastern border.

== Population ==
Historical population
Year	Pop.	±% p.a.
1968	244	—
1975	215	−1.79%
1982	213	−0.13%
1990	194	−1.16%
1999	194	+0.00%
2007	168	−1.78%
2012	170	+0.24%
2017	159	−1.33%
2023	140	−2.10%
Source: INSEE

== Sights ==
- The church, dating from the thirteenth century.
- The ruins of an eleventh-century castle.
- The château de Margeleix, dating from the seventeenth century.
- The chapel at Vallensanges

== See also ==
- Communes of the Creuse department
