= Saint-Médard-la-Rochette =

Commune in Nouvelle-Aquitaine, France

- Commune
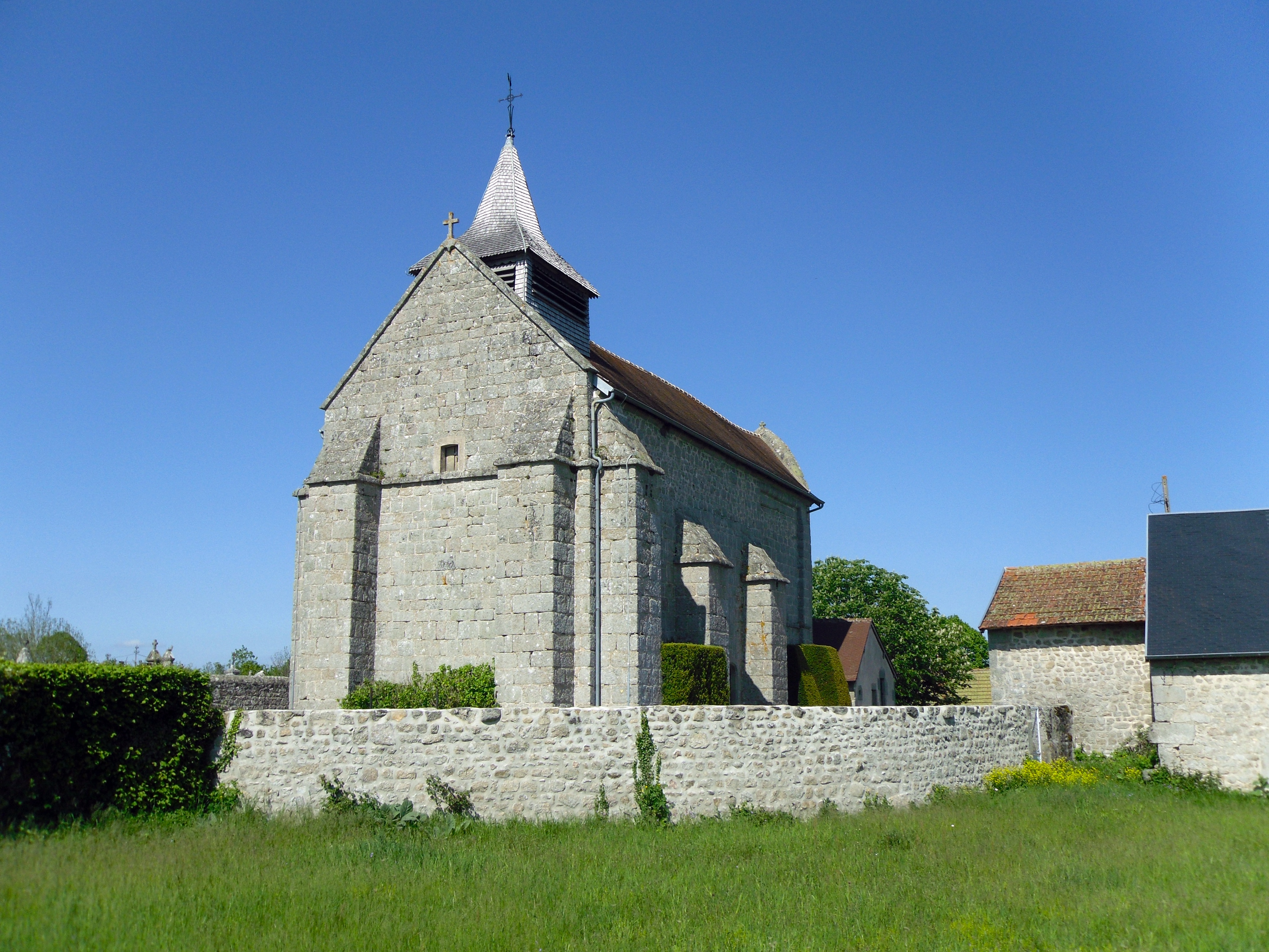
- The church in Saint-Médard-la-Rochette
- Location of Saint-Médard-la-Rochette
- Location within France Location within Nouvelle-Aquitaine
- Coordinates: 46°02′41″N 2°08′49″E
- Country: France
- Region: Nouvelle-Aquitaine
- Department: Creuse
- Arrondissement: Aubusson
- Canton: Gouzon
- Intercommunality: CC Marche et Combraille en Aquitaine

Government
  - Mayor (2020–2026): Hervé Trimoulinard
- Area^{1}: 38.92 km^{2} (15.03 sq mi)
- Elevation: 570 m (1,870 ft)
- Highest elevation: 613 m (2,011 ft)
- Lowest elevation: 379 m (1,243 ft)
- Population (2023): 559
  - Density: 14.4/km^{2} (37.2/sq mi)
- Time zone: UTC+01:00 (CET)
  - Summer (DST): UTC+02:00 (CEST)
- INSEE/Postal code: 23220 /23200
- ^{1} French Land Register data, which excludes lakes, ponds, glaciers > 1 km^{2} (0.386 sq mi or 247 acres) and river estuaries.

Saint-Médard-la-Rochette (French pronunciation: [sɛ̃ medaʁ la ʁɔʃɛt]; Occitan: Sent Medard e la Rocheta) is a commune in the Creuse department in central France.

== Population ==
Historical population
Year	Pop.	±% p.a.
1968	881	—
1975	781	−1.71%
1982	691	−1.73%
1990	626	−1.23%
1999	608	−0.32%
2007	576	−0.67%
2012	575	−0.03%
2017	583	+0.28%
2023	559	−0.70%
Source: INSEE

== See also ==
- Communes of the Creuse department
