= Saint-Dizier-la-Tour =

Commune in Nouvelle-Aquitaine, France

- Commune
- Location of Saint-Dizier-la-Tour
- Location within France Location within Nouvelle-Aquitaine
- Coordinates: 46°08′49″N 2°09′14″E
- Country: France
- Region: Nouvelle-Aquitaine
- Department: Creuse
- Arrondissement: Aubusson
- Canton: Gouzon
- Intercommunality: CC Marche et Combraille en Aquitaine

Government
  - Mayor (2020–2026): Jacques Cordier
- Area^{1}: 16.99 km^{2} (6.56 sq mi)
- Elevation: 500 m (1,600 ft)
- Highest elevation: 554 m (1,818 ft)
- Lowest elevation: 444 m (1,457 ft)
- Population (2023): 178
  - Density: 10.5/km^{2} (27.1/sq mi)
- Time zone: UTC+01:00 (CET)
  - Summer (DST): UTC+02:00 (CEST)
- INSEE/Postal code: 23187 /23130
- ^{1} French Land Register data, which excludes lakes, ponds, glaciers > 1 km^{2} (0.386 sq mi or 247 acres) and river estuaries.

Saint-Dizier-la-Tour (French pronunciation: [sɛ̃ dizje la tuʁ]; Auvergnat: Sent Desíer la Tor) is a commune in the Creuse department in central France. It is particularly noted for its heritage: three feudal mottes, the documentation that has survived about its early past, and the archaeological finds of everyday military and domestic articles discovered when two of the mottes were excavated. There is also evidence of the medieval priory and various Roman remains.

== Geography ==
The commune of St Dizier la Tour is in the department of the Creuse, in the Nouvelle-Aquitaine region of central France. It lies close to the medieval town of Chénérailles and the 15th-century château de Villemonteix.

It is essentially rural, consisting of two former communes, La-Tour-St-Austrille (now known simply as “La Tour”) and St Dizier, which were united in 1848 because they were both considered too small to be viable. It is crossed by two Gallo-Roman roads and two large streams, the Goze and the Verreau. The Goze gave its name to the nearby town of Gouzon and the village of Gouzougnat.

On the banks of the Goze are the remains of numerous Roman settlements and villas which were equipped with their own large artificial pools or étangs. The village of La-Tour-St-Austrille grew up at the first crossing-point of the Goze, which starts a few kilometres away at La Faye and passes through a glacial valley. The stream was originally surrounded by marshland.

== History ==
=== Roman influence ===
The Roman road that comes from Limoges via Ahun splits into two to the east of Villemonteix. One route goes to Bourges and passes Châtelus, Parsac and Toulx-St-Croix, which is the way that Saint Martial, the bishop who evangelised the Limousin, came from Bourges in the 4th century. The second road goes to Neris-les-Bains, south of Montluçon, via Gouzon, Chambon-sur-Voueize and Evaux-les-Bains.

These two important roads deliberately followed the dry land along the crest of the hills and there must have been spur roads linking them. As La Tour-St-Austrille is the first practical place where it was possible to cross the Goze, it is likely to have been the first southerly link. The connecting path went across the dam of a Roman lake near the remains of a Roman villa called Caceria.

=== 10th century ===
By the mid-950s, more than a century after the death of Charlemagne, his far-reaching Carolingian Empire was a distant memory, split by internal divisions, power struggles and land seizures. A multitude of large and small warlords, who laid claim to the lands, started to build feudal mottes as a sign of their power but also as watchtowers monitoring channels of communication and places for extracting tolls from travellers.

The area in which the territory of La-Tour-St-Austrille stood was border country called La Marche – “the frontier” – which acted as a buffer zone for the Duchy of Aquitaine against the neighbouring powers. La Tour-St-Austrille itself was part of Aquitaine, and only slightly further north was the kingdom of France, with the frontier fluctuating between Boussac and Parsac.

The Brosse family of Chaillac in Indre, who owned the land at La-Tour-St-Austrille, probably erected a feudal motte called la Louveraude at La Tour some time before 957. It would have been topped by a watch-tower made from wood and wattle and daub, and flanked by a lower bailey or courtyard. It was this first tower which gave the former villa of Caceria its new name of “La Tour-St-Austrille”, being called after the saint who had been Bishop of Bourges from 612-624.

In March 957, Rothilde, the Brosse heiress and owner of La Tour-Saint-Austrille, and her then husband Archambaud de Comborn, sold the avouerie of La Tour-Saint-Austrille, located on the old villa Caceria, to Droctricus, seigneur of Parsac. An avouerie was an arrangement between a religious establishment and a lay seigneur, who undertook to represent its interests in secular affairs and sometimes defend it in combat.

Droctricus built and endowed a church on the site and in August 958 he gave it to Ebbles, bishop of Limoges and brother of the Duc d’Aquitaine. The deed was then signed by Raynald, Vicomte d’Aubusson, and Boson de Charroux, Comte de la Marche, who had emerged from the Limousin to carve out a territory in the Haute-Marche. Droctricus, hitherto vassal of the family of Brosse, thus became a vassal of Boson 1st. It was the first act of Boson as Comte de la Marche.

The sale of 957 may have been a precaution taken by Rothilde to get rid of property that she knew was going to be disputed and was too remote to be defended from her base at Chaillac, about 90 km away. A long war was waged between Boson's family and that of Geraud de Limoges and Rothilde de Brosse, and would not be completed until 974, when a diplomatic marriage was made between Boson’s son and Geraud’s daughter.

According to the 1520 terrier of La Tour-St-Austrille, it was probably around 975 that the large motte belonging to the Comte de la Marche was built in the village next to La Louveraude. The Comte de la Marche needed to stamp his authority on La Tour-St-Austrille, in case Droctricus or his heirs had maintained ties with their former overlords, the Brosse family, so the new motte was more imposing than that of La Louveraude.

In the same general period a pair of small mottes was also built in La-Tour-St-Austrille to act as a toll station for the Roman road.

=== 11th century onwards ===
==== The Priory ====
In the first half of the 11th century the priory chapel of St Austrille was constructed in stone, probably replacing the original wooden church. There is evidence to suggest that the work was done by the same team of builders who built the churches at Parsac and Lupersat.

The capitals of the pillars of these three buildings evoke the theme of the Last Judgment, temptation, sin and punishment. They were intended to instil a fear of hell in the congregation. Other capitals from the chapel, now spread around the village and re-used, seem to have been re-employed in their turn from the ruins of the Roman villa.

In 1095, to stop the “eternal recriminations” between the monks of Déols near Chateauroux, and the Bishop of Limoges, over who owned the priory, the bishop handed it over to Déols. The political influence returned to the Berry. From 1200, powerful lords, all belonging to the family of the princes of Déols, took over the title and received the rents of the seigneurie of La Tour-Saint-Austrille.

Before 1212 the monks founded the churches of St Michel at La Tour and St Dizier & St Blaise at St Dizier. A Bull of Pope Innocent III, dated 1212, confirmed that the abbey possessed the priory chapel of St Austrille, the chapel (later church) of St Michel and the church of St Dizier.

In the 15th century everything fell into ruins after the onslaught of the Black Death and the massacres resulting from the Hundred Years' War. But the second half of the 15th century was also one of reconstruction after these disasters. The monks created a new pool and a corn mill, which still stand today; the road and toll barrier were moved to pass over the dam of the new pool and the old dam was destroyed. The small mottes then lost their role.

In 1573 the Lord Prior of la Tour appears to have been a very large landowner. The pool and mill belonged to him, together with a lot of land and several farms under the metayage system from which he received a percentage of the harvest.

The monks left this area before 1645. In that year the priory buildings still existed but they had no religious presence and the priest of La Tour was obliged to say Mass in the chapel of St Austrille every Friday. There was still a titular 'prior' who collected the feudal dues owed by the inhabitants, who paid their tithes to him until the Revolution in 1789.

In 1791, as a result of the revolutionary government’s decision to take over all religious property, an inventory was taken of the priory’s goods and possessions. In addition to the revenue from the tithe, this included “a house and other buildings situated in the centre of La Tour, of which there remain only ruins, a pool, a mill which has been closed and a domaine in the same place.” The revenue of the priory was valued at 3200 livres in the commune of La Tour, and 890 in the commune of St Dizier.

The current holder of the title of prior was Puy Segur, a layman. The goods were then appropriated by the State and sold as bien nationaux, or national assets.

==== The seigneurie ====
The seigneurie of La-Tour-St-Austrille, which belonged to the Brosse family in 957, was transferred between 1200 and 1609 among various members of the Preuilly branch of the family of Déols. In 1609, Claude de Puy, widow of Loys Chasteignier, seigneur of Abain, Chantemille and La-Tour-St-Austrille, sold it to Francois Merigot, seigneur of Sainte-Feyre, for 18,000 livres. The priory and seigneurie exercised their rights over numerous neighbouring villages and parishes. The nearest was that of St Dizier, which encircled the commune of La Tour. St Dizier was a fiefdom, providing revenue and forced labour for both priory and seigneurie. Also, until the Revolution, the seigneurs of Villemonteix, Orgnat, Vidignat, Malleret, Haute-Faye, the religious communities of Les Ternes and Bonlieu, and the vicairie of St Catherine d'Etansannes (among others), collected their dues from the two parishes. The parish of St Dizier consisted of the village of St Dizier itself plus the hamlets of Montbrenon, Busserolles, Les Chaises, Ponty and Orgnat, and two other settlements which have now disappeared – Les Olliers and Gravayoux. The seigneurie of La Tour belonged to the powerful and faraway family in Déols (~100 km), but in the actual vicinity there were 'junior' lords endowed with their own chateaux: le Mas de la Tour, and the chateaux of Orgnat and La Faye in the commune of St Dizier. These seigneurial domaines were established on the sites of the original Roman villas and were extensive. At the time of the Revolution the lands belonging to the abbeys were also sold off as national assets.

== Feudal mottes ==
La-Tour-St-Austrille has retained traces of its exceptional early history and the smaller pair of its remaining three feudal mottes is very well preserved. Two of the mottes – the large motte and the more southerly of the two small mottes – were subject of an archaeological dig in 1865, and have delivered up important finds, including weapons and tools. The towers which topped the mottes were burned, probably in the 14th century. Their sites were tidied and landscaped in 2012 and although on private land are now open to public viewing. Evidence from the dig of 1865 would suggest that the tower on the large motte was an elaborate structure and that it was destroyed by fire, probably in the 14th century. Many items were found there connected with daily life in the Middle Ages, including agricultural and forestry tools, hand-operated grinding mills for grain, a mortar, whet-stones, spinning equipment, many pottery fragments, sheep shearing scissors, a drill, an awl and a toothed piece of metal to hold a cooking pot over a fire.

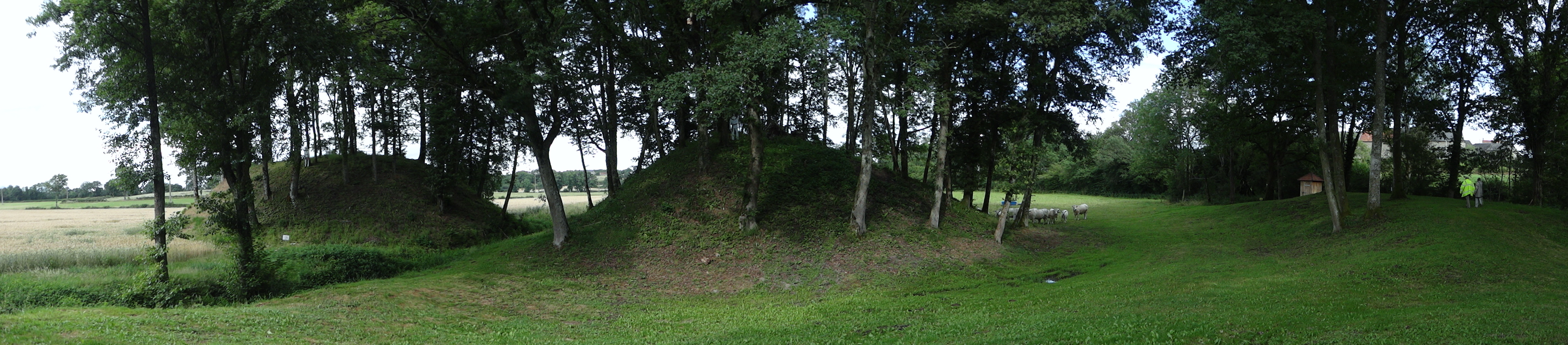
Panorama of the Feudal Mottes in Saint-Dizier-La-Tour

The small motte, which had also been burned down, contained more modest remains in much smaller numbers. But amongst them was a small hand-bell which is thought to have been used by a lookout to alert a toll collector, and may confirm the motte’s role as a watchtower and toll station.

== Village of La Tour ==
A sightseeing tour of the village has been devised by the local association responsible for developing and publicising its historical sites. An illustrated guidebook is available locally and there are explanatory panels along the route. The walk takes in the following places:

The church of St Michel.

The lake and watermill originally belonging to the Priory.

The site of the Louveraude Motte.

The remains of the large motte.

The site of the priory and its chapel.

The former chateau of La Tour.

Part of the old Roman road.

The small mottes.

The old tithe barn.

The Maison Gaschon, a farmer's house which has hardly changed since 1520.

The Tribunal or seigneurial court.

== Administration ==
The current mayor is Jacques Cordier, who was elected in 2020.

== Population ==
Historical population
Year	Pop.	±% p.a.
1968	370	—
1975	321	−2.01%
1982	276	−2.13%
1990	234	−2.04%
1999	228	−0.29%
2007	233	+0.27%
2012	209	−2.15%
2017	212	+0.29%
2023	178	−2.87%
Source: INSEE

== See also ==
- Communes of the Creuse department

== Notes ==
Cartulaire de Saint Etienne de Limoges:

Charte n°7, Vente par Archambaud de Comborn et sa femme Rothilde de Brosse de biens situés près de la Tour St Austrille. Mars 957 ou 958.

Charte n°8, Don par Droctricus de l’église de La Tour par lui dotée, à Ebbles, évêque de Limoges. 9 Août 958 ou 959.

Comtes de Poitou et Ducs de Guyenne (Jean Besly 1571–1647)

Comtes et Vicomtes de Limoges (Robert de Lasteyrie 1849–1921)

Les Comtes de Limoges de la maison de Charroux (Georges Thomas t.23 des mémoires de la SSNHAC 1927)

L’ancien diocèse de Limoges des origines au milieu du 11ème siècle (Michel Aubrun)
