= Issoudun-Létrieix =

Commune in Nouvelle-Aquitaine, France

- Commune
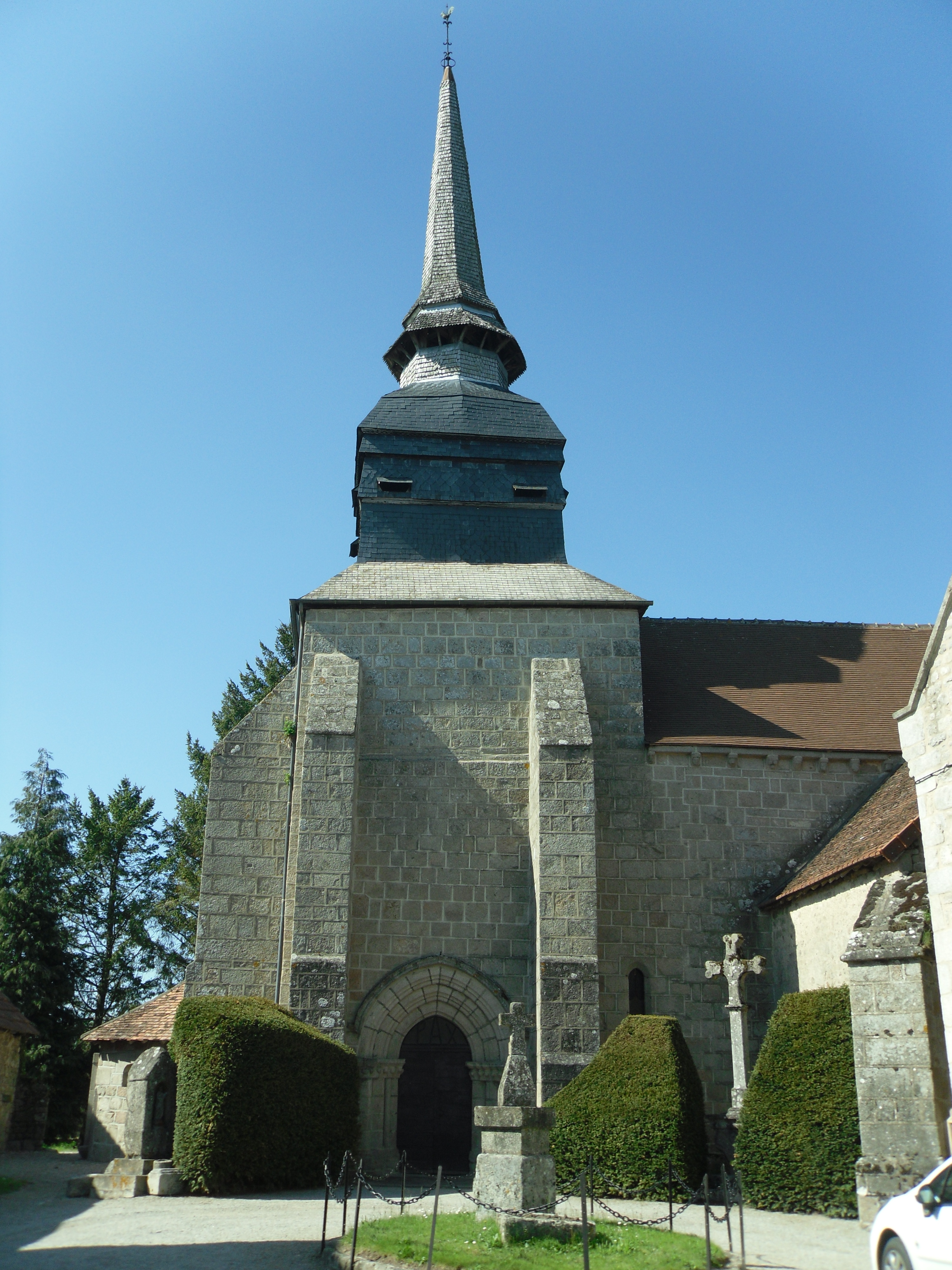
- The church in Issoudun-Létrieix

- Coat of arms
- Location of Issoudun-Létrieix
- Location within France Location within Nouvelle-Aquitaine
- Coordinates: 46°03′40″N 2°08′38″E
- Country: France
- Region: Nouvelle-Aquitaine
- Department: Creuse
- Arrondissement: Aubusson
- Canton: Gouzon
- Intercommunality: CC Marche et Combraille en Aquitaine

Government
  - Mayor (2020–2026): Jean-Claude Conchon
- Area^{1}: 26.43 km^{2} (10.20 sq mi)
- Elevation: 405 m (1,329 ft)
- Highest elevation: 598 m (1,962 ft)
- Lowest elevation: 384 m (1,260 ft)
- Population (2023): 291
  - Density: 11.0/km^{2} (28.5/sq mi)
- Time zone: UTC+01:00 (CET)
  - Summer (DST): UTC+02:00 (CEST)
- INSEE/Postal code: 23097 /23130
- ^{1} French Land Register data, which excludes lakes, ponds, glaciers > 1 km^{2} (0.386 sq mi or 247 acres) and river estuaries.

Issoudun-Létrieix (French pronunciation: [isudœ̃ letʁijɛ]; Occitan: Eissodun) is a commune in the Creuse department in the Nouvelle-Aquitaine region in central France.

== Geography ==
A large area of forestry and farming, comprising the village and several hamlets situated some 7 miles (11 km) north of Aubusson, near the junction of the D54 and the D94 roads and also on the D990. The commune is in the valley of the Creuse.

== Population ==
Historical population
Year	Pop.	±% p.a.
1968	452	—
1975	387	−2.19%
1982	341	−1.79%
1990	287	−2.13%
1999	277	−0.39%
2007	298	+0.92%
2012	299	+0.07%
2017	299	+0.00%
2023	291	−0.45%
Source: INSEE

== Sights ==
- The thirteenth-century church.
- An ancient oil mill.
- Vestiges of Roman occupation.
- The fifteenth-century château de Haute-Faye.

== See also ==
- Communes of the Creuse department
