= Sarran =

- Commune
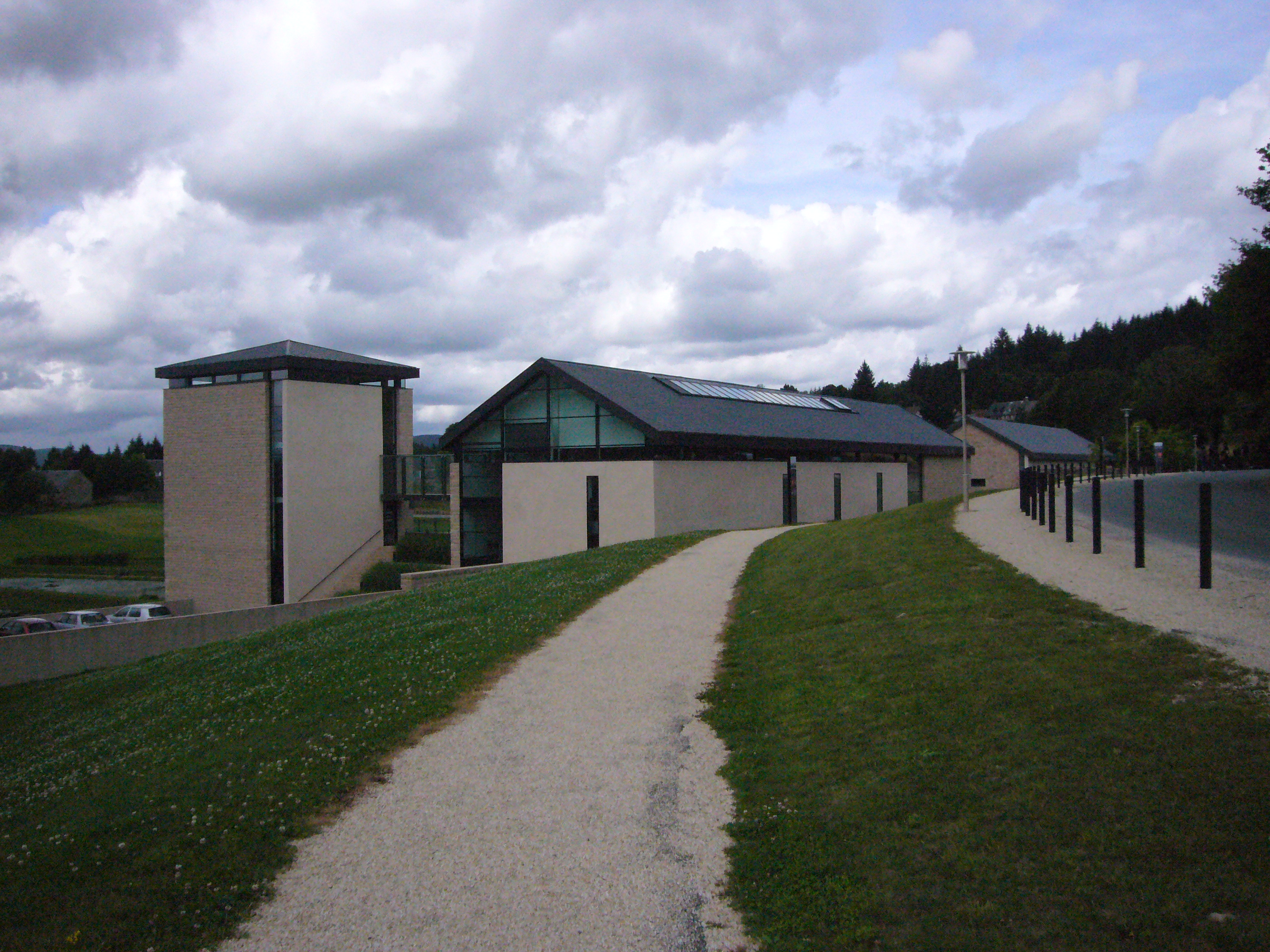
- Chirac Museum

- Coat of arms
- Location of Sarran
- Location within France Location within Nouvelle-Aquitaine
- Coordinates: 45°24′34″N 1°56′21″E
- Country: France
- Region: Nouvelle-Aquitaine
- Department: Corrèze
- Arrondissement: Ussel
- Canton: Égletons

Government
  - Mayor (2020–2026): Agnès Audureau
- Area^{1}: 26.09 km^{2} (10.07 sq mi)
- Highest elevation: 819 m (2,687 ft)
- Lowest elevation: 500 m (1,600 ft)
- Population (2023): 262
  - Density: 10.0/km^{2} (26.0/sq mi)
- Time zone: UTC+01:00 (CET)
  - Summer (DST): UTC+02:00 (CEST)
- INSEE/Postal code: 19251 /19800
- ^{1} French Land Register data, which excludes lakes, ponds, glaciers > 1 km^{2} (0.386 sq mi or 247 acres) and river estuaries.

Sarran (French pronunciation: [saʁɑ̃]; Occitan: Serran) is a commune in the Corrèze department in central France.

It is the home of the Jacques Chirac presidential museum.

== Population ==
Historical population
Year	Pop.	±% p.a.
1968	367	—
1975	321	−1.89%
1982	293	−1.30%
1990	275	−0.79%
1999	287	+0.48%
2007	273	−0.62%
2012	260	−0.97%
2017	275	+1.13%
2023	262	−0.80%
Source: INSEE

== See also ==
- Communes of the Corrèze department
