= Lavaveix-les-Mines =

Commune in Nouvelle-Aquitaine, France

- Commune
- Location of Lavaveix-les-Mines
- Location within France Location within Nouvelle-Aquitaine
- Coordinates: 46°04′20″N 2°05′22″E
- Country: France
- Region: Nouvelle-Aquitaine
- Department: Creuse
- Arrondissement: Aubusson
- Canton: Gouzon
- Intercommunality: CC Marche et Combraille en Aquitaine

Government
  - Mayor (2020–2026): Jean-Louis Fauconnet
- Area^{1}: 4.71 km^{2} (1.82 sq mi)
- Elevation: 387 m (1,270 ft)
- Highest elevation: 500 m (1,600 ft)
- Lowest elevation: 366 m (1,201 ft)
- Population (2023): 684
  - Density: 145/km^{2} (376/sq mi)
- Time zone: UTC+01:00 (CET)
  - Summer (DST): UTC+02:00 (CEST)
- INSEE/Postal code: 23105 /23150
- ^{1} French Land Register data, which excludes lakes, ponds, glaciers > 1 km^{2} (0.386 sq mi or 247 acres) and river estuaries.

Lavaveix-les-Mines (French pronunciation: [lavavɛ le min]; Occitan: La Vavetz) is a commune in the Creuse department in the Nouvelle-Aquitaine region in central France.

== Geography ==
A farming village situated in the valley of the river Creuse, some 10 miles (16 km) northwest of Aubusson, at the junction of the D55, D94 and the D942 roads.

== Population ==
Historical population
Year	Pop.	±% p.a.
1968	1,175	—
1975	1,043	−1.69%
1982	989	−0.76%
1990	964	−0.32%
1999	838	−1.54%
2007	813	−0.38%
2012	720	−2.40%
2017	666	−1.55%
2023	684	+0.45%
Source: INSEE

== Sights ==
- The nineteenth-century church.
- Remnants of the nineteenth-century coalmines.

== See also ==
- Communes of the Creuse department
