= Le Chauchet =

Commune in Nouvelle-Aquitaine, France

- Commune
- Location of Le Chauchet
- Location within France Location within Nouvelle-Aquitaine
- Coordinates: 46°06′30″N 2°20′04″E
- Country: France
- Region: Nouvelle-Aquitaine
- Department: Creuse
- Arrondissement: Aubusson
- Canton: Gouzon
- Intercommunality: CC Marche et Combraille en Aquitaine

Government
  - Mayor (2020–2026): Philippe Monteil
- Area^{1}: 10.62 km^{2} (4.10 sq mi)
- Elevation: 480 m (1,570 ft)
- Highest elevation: 515 m (1,690 ft)
- Lowest elevation: 390 m (1,280 ft)
- Population (2023): 102
  - Density: 9.60/km^{2} (24.9/sq mi)
- Time zone: UTC+01:00 (CET)
  - Summer (DST): UTC+02:00 (CEST)
- INSEE/Postal code: 23058 /23130
- ^{1} French Land Register data, which excludes lakes, ponds, glaciers > 1 km^{2} (0.386 sq mi or 247 acres) and river estuaries.

Le Chauchet (French pronunciation: [lə ʃoʃɛ]; Occitan: Lo Chauchèt) is a commune in the Creuse department in the Nouvelle-Aquitaine region in central France.

== Geography ==
A farming area comprising a small village and several hamlets, situated on the eastern side of the valley of the river Tardes, some 13 miles (21 km) northeast of Aubusson, near the junction of the D6 and the D993 roads.

== Population ==
Historical population
Year	Pop.	±% p.a.
1968	184	—
1975	154	−2.51%
1982	130	−2.39%
1990	104	−2.75%
1999	104	+0.00%
2007	105	+0.12%
2012	109	+0.75%
2017	109	+0.00%
2023	102	−1.10%
Source: INSEE

== Sights ==
- The eighteenth-century church.
- A medieval bridge over the Tardes.

== See also ==
- Communes of the Creuse department
