= Château de la Johannie =

Castle in Nouvelle-Aquitaine, France

Coordinates: 45.0000°N 1.7425°E

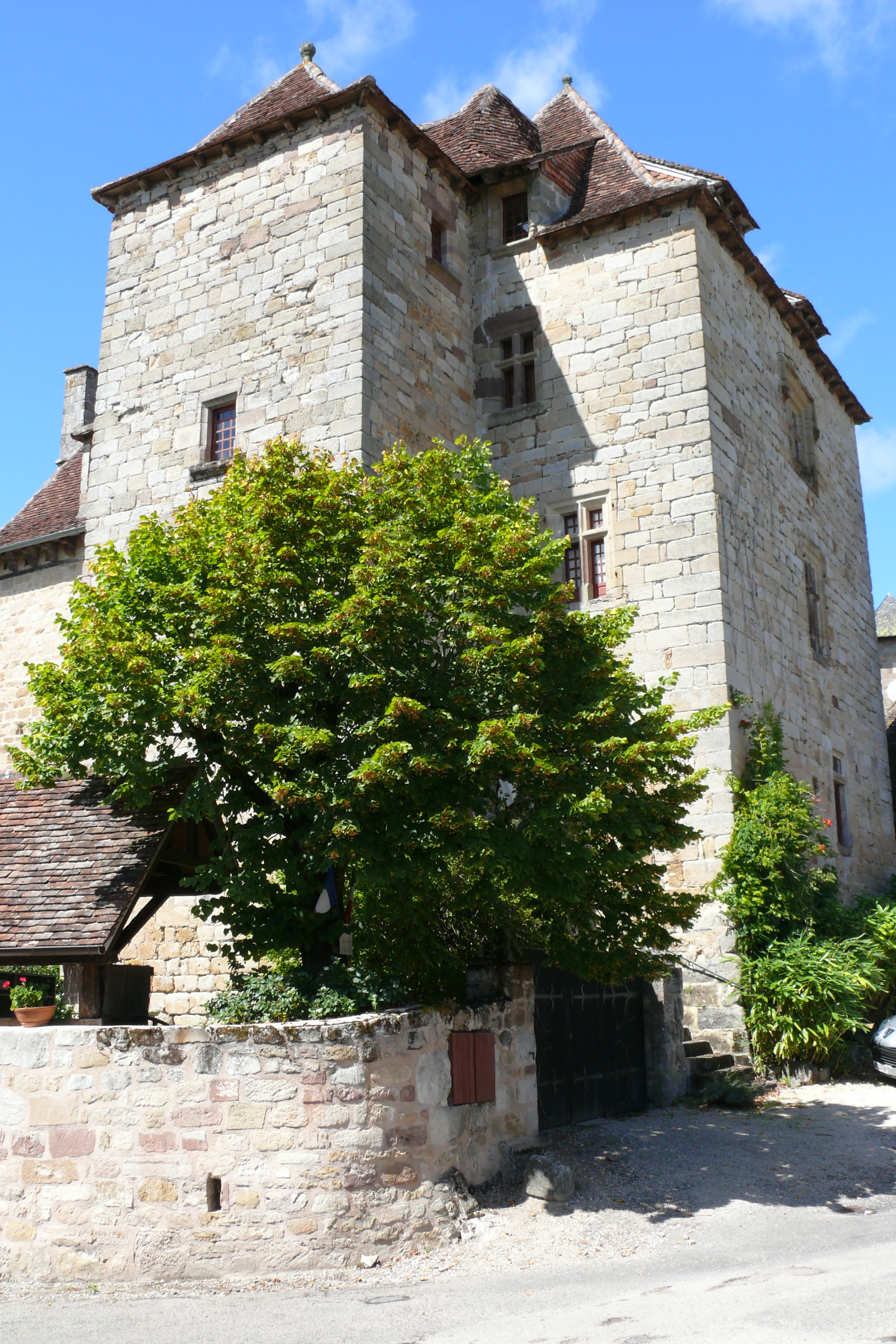
- Interactive map of the Château de la Johannie area

The Château de la Johannie is an historic castle in Curemonte, Corrèze, Nouvelle-Aquitaine, France.

== Toponymy ==
Johannes is the latin form of Jean or John and is named after the original owner or the house of Jean. Château means "castle" in French.

== History ==
It was built circa 1308 on an old house built in 1083. It belonged to Hugues de Jean in the 14th century. It stayed in the Jean family (later known as the Johannie family) until 1498, when it was acquired by Vassal family, who owned 1/7th of Curemonte. Marguerite de la Johannie had married Pierre Vassal in 1460 who was the Lord of Tourette nearby in Betaille.

It was acquired by Mathurin le Brun on 11 March 1623 after the widow of Jacques de Vassal, Marguerite de Belcastel de Campaniac and nephew Jean Vassal sold it. Then it was acquired by the d'Ambert family when Antoine d'Ambert married Agathe le Brun in 1594. It was acquired by the Plas family in 1693 who resided next door at Châteaux de Saint-Hilaire et des Plas.

In 1830, the descendants of the Plas family left Curemonte, and Chateau de la Johannie was now in the hands of the Escaravage family which held it until 1971. It was then purchased by the Bescançon family as a second home and kept it until 1988 when it was purchased by the Pierre Wack family.

== Architecture ==
This house consists of two wings. A square stair tower located at the centre of the two wings houses with a spiral staircase that serves the two buildings. The buildings had defensive machicolation's or loopholes at roof height, but they were removed in the past. The main entrance door, above ground level, would have been accessed by a wooded staircase and deck in the past. The windows become larger as the height above the ground increase. On the east side, there is a carved window.

It has been listed as an official monument since 1981.
