= Chénérailles =

Commune in Nouvelle-Aquitaine, France

- Commune
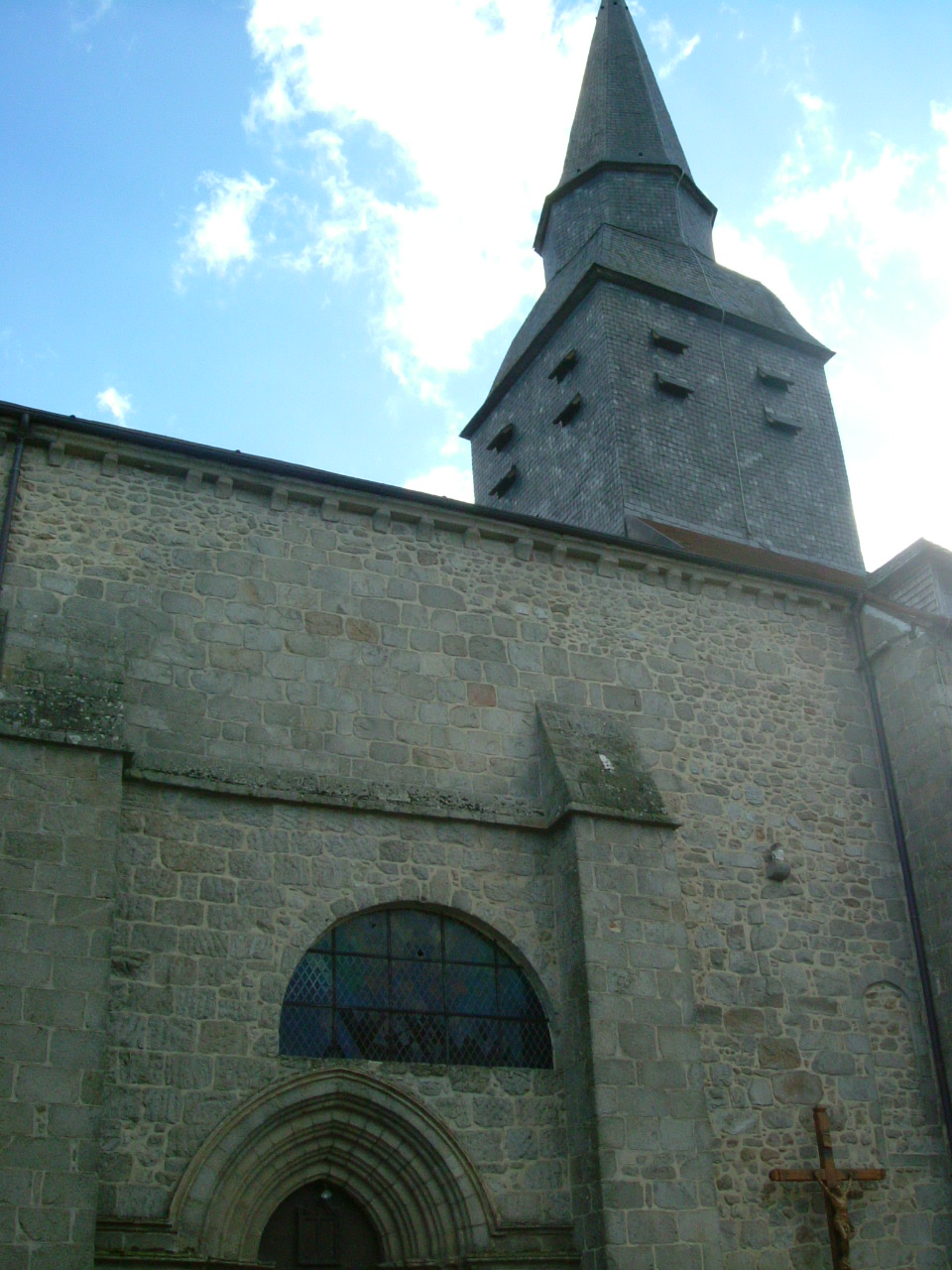
- The church in Chénérailles

- Coat of arms
- Location of Chénérailles
- Location within France Location within Nouvelle-Aquitaine
- Coordinates: 46°06′47″N 2°10′34″E
- Country: France
- Region: Nouvelle-Aquitaine
- Department: Creuse
- Arrondissement: Aubusson
- Canton: Gouzon
- Intercommunality: CC Marche et Combraille en Aquitaine

Government
  - Mayor (2020–2026): Alexandre Verdier
- Area^{1}: 7.77 km^{2} (3.00 sq mi)
- Elevation: 560 m (1,840 ft)
- Highest elevation: 553 m (1,814 ft)
- Lowest elevation: 487 m (1,598 ft)
- Population (2023): 728
  - Density: 93.7/km^{2} (243/sq mi)
- Time zone: UTC+01:00 (CET)
  - Summer (DST): UTC+02:00 (CEST)
- INSEE/Postal code: 23061 /23130
- ^{1} French Land Register data, which excludes lakes, ponds, glaciers > 1 km^{2} (0.386 sq mi or 247 acres) and river estuaries.

Chénérailles (French pronunciation: [ʃeneʁaj]; Occitan: Charnalhas) is a commune in the Creuse department in central France.

== Geography ==
A small town situated at the junction of the D997, D4, D7 and D55 roads, 12 miles to the north of Aubusson, on a hill dominating marshy areas from which rises a tributary of the Voueize.

== History ==
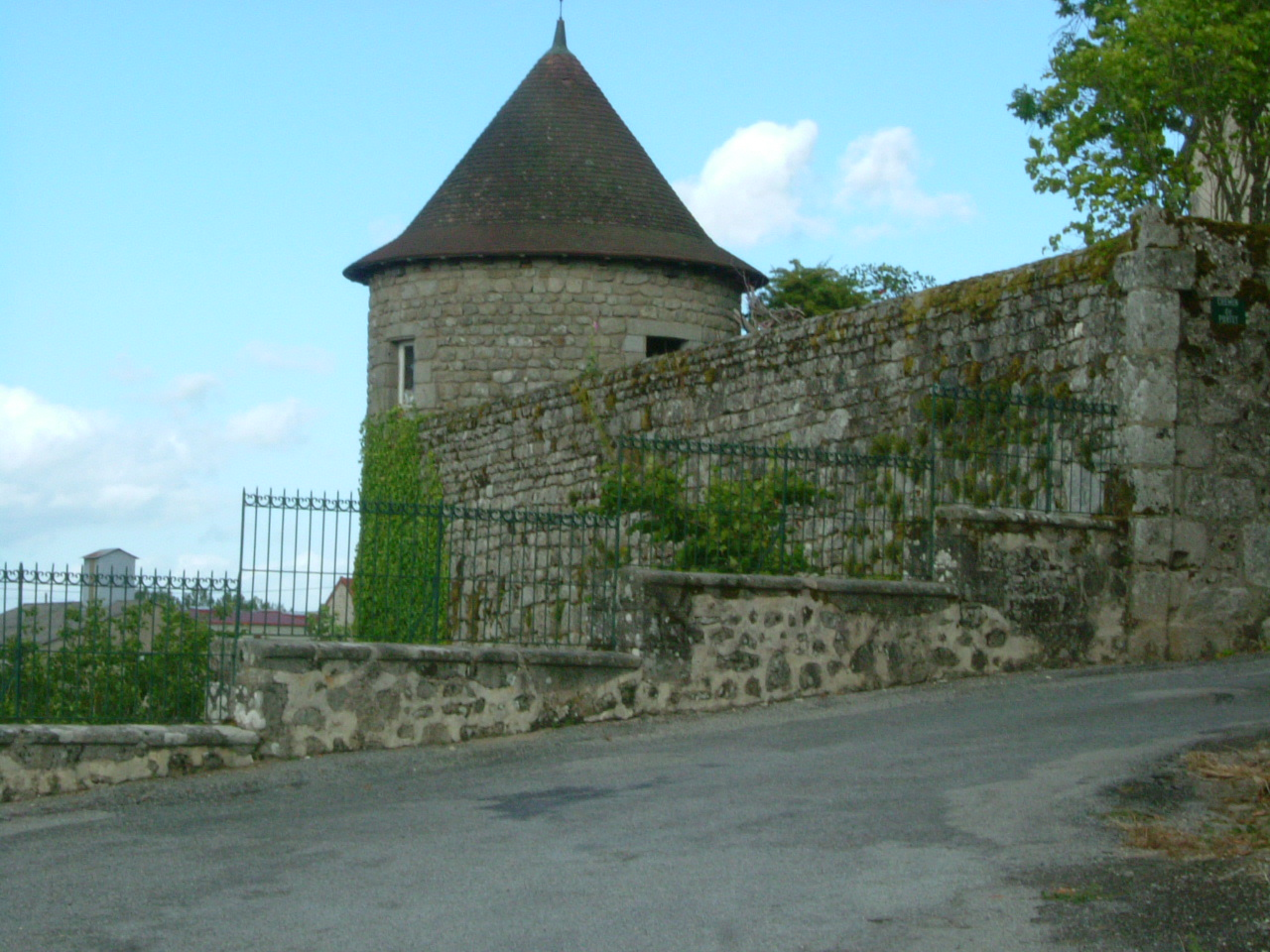
Part of the medieval defences

Originally a fortified stronghold going back to before Roman times, there's plenty of evidence found of Roman occupation too (urns, papyrus ashes, coins and medallions of the emperors Maximilian, Gallien, Gordien and Licinius). The city was once surrounded by a strong wall, in the middle of which there was a castle (since destroyed). These days, the site is occupied by the parish church of St Barthélémy. Chénérailles suffered from the wars against the English early in the 15th century, being almost completely destroyed, but Jacques and Bernard of Armagnac, Comtes de la Marche, rebuilt the place between the years 1430 and 1440. The first of these Counts, Jacques, re-confirmed several privileges that had been granted to Chénérailles, in 1265, by Hugues XII of Lusignan. In 1592, towards the end of the French Wars of Religion, the city supported the Catholic League and was besieged for 8 months, only surrendering when they were starved out.

== Population ==
The town had 1,100 inhabitants in 1841.

Historical population
Year	Pop.	±% p.a.
1968	729	—
1975	674	−1.11%
1982	685	+0.23%
1990	794	+1.86%
1999	759	−0.50%
2007	737	−0.37%
2012	765	+0.75%
2017	760	−0.13%
2023	728	−0.71%
Source: INSEE

== Sights ==
- St. Barthélemy church, dating from the thirteenth century.
- The nineteenth century chapel of Notre-Dame.
- The ancient ramparts.

== See also ==
- Communes of the Creuse département
