= Saint-Chabrais =

Commune in Nouvelle-Aquitaine, France

- Commune
- Location of Saint-Chabrais
- Location within France Location within Nouvelle-Aquitaine
- Coordinates: 46°07′59″N 2°12′19″E
- Country: France
- Region: Nouvelle-Aquitaine
- Department: Creuse
- Arrondissement: Aubusson
- Canton: Gouzon
- Intercommunality: CC Marche et Combraille en Aquitaine

Government
  - Mayor (2020–2026): Patrice Morançais
- Area^{1}: 24.94 km^{2} (9.63 sq mi)
- Elevation: 456 m (1,496 ft)
- Highest elevation: 542 m (1,778 ft)
- Lowest elevation: 389 m (1,276 ft)
- Population (2023): 317
  - Density: 12.7/km^{2} (32.9/sq mi)
- Time zone: UTC+01:00 (CET)
  - Summer (DST): UTC+02:00 (CEST)
- INSEE/Postal code: 23185 /23130
- ^{1} French Land Register data, which excludes lakes, ponds, glaciers > 1 km^{2} (0.386 sq mi or 247 acres) and river estuaries.

Saint-Chabrais (French pronunciation: [sɛ̃ ʃabʁɛ]; Occitan: Sent Chabrés) is a commune in the Creuse department in central France.

== Population ==
Historical population
Year	Pop.	±% p.a.
1968	537	—
1975	469	−1.92%
1982	399	−2.28%
1990	379	−0.64%
1999	335	−1.36%
2007	329	−0.23%
2012	320	−0.55%
2017	294	−1.68%
2023	317	+1.26%
Source: INSEE

== See also ==
- Communes of the Creuse department
