= Curemonte =

- Commune
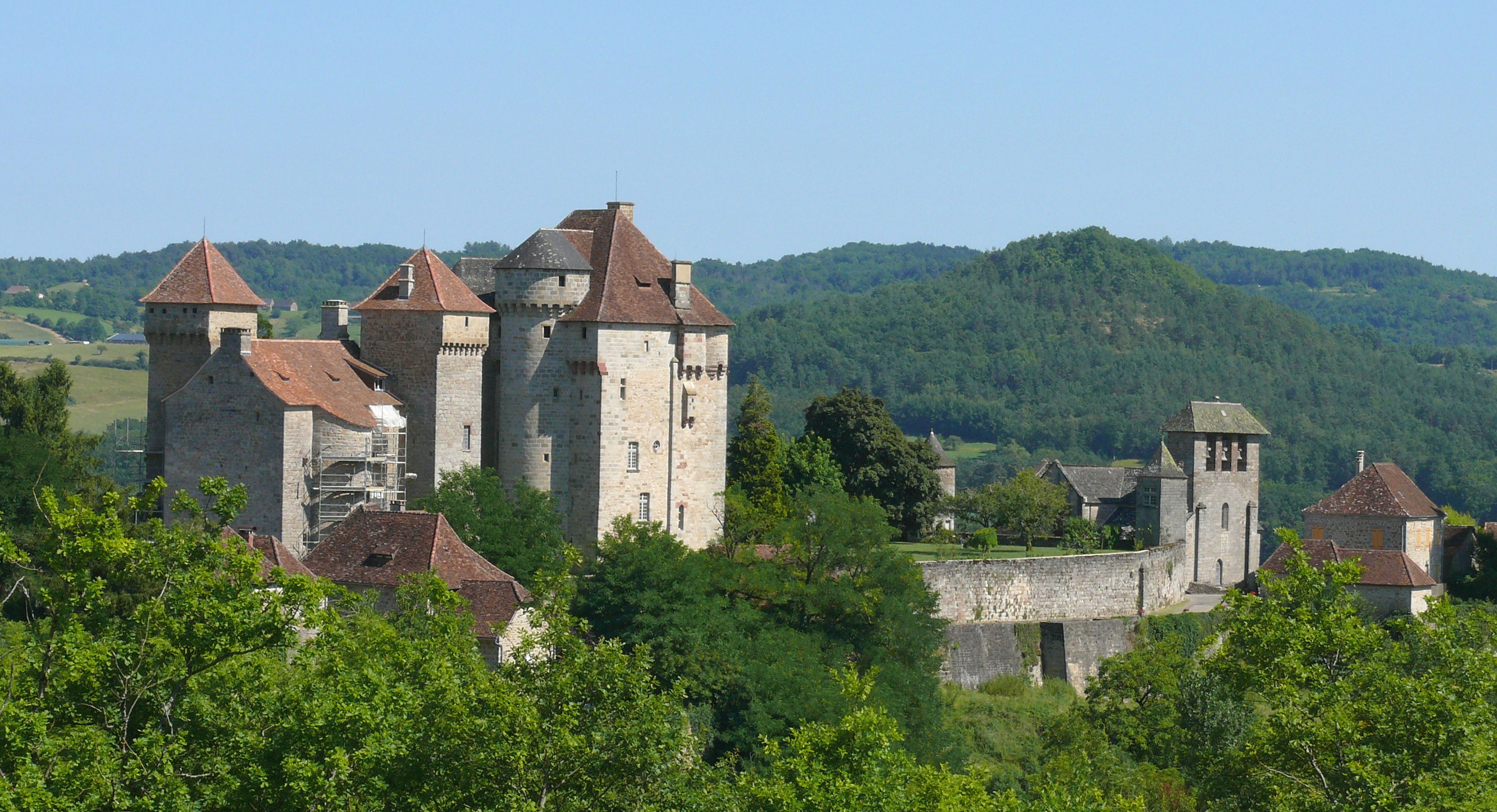
- The Château des Plas, in Curemonte

- Coat of arms
- Location of Curemonte
- Location within France Location within Nouvelle-Aquitaine
- Coordinates: 45°00′00″N 1°44′27″E
- Country: France
- Region: Nouvelle-Aquitaine
- Department: Corrèze
- Arrondissement: Brive-la-Gaillarde
- Canton: Midi Corrézien
- Intercommunality: Midi Corrézien

Government
  - Mayor (2020–2026): Nelly Germane
- Area^{1}: 8.83 km^{2} (3.41 sq mi)
- Elevation: 143 m (469 ft)
- Population (2023): 219
  - Density: 24.8/km^{2} (64.2/sq mi)
- Time zone: UTC+01:00 (CET)
  - Summer (DST): UTC+02:00 (CEST)
- INSEE/Postal code: 19067 /19500
- ^{1} French Land Register data, which excludes lakes, ponds, glaciers > 1 km^{2} (0.386 sq mi or 247 acres) and river estuaries.

Curemonte (French pronunciation: [kyʁmɔ̃t]; Limousin: Curamonta) is a commune in the Corrèze department in central France. It is a medieval village characterised by its three castles. In a fortified position on a ridge overlooking a valley on both its eastern and western flanks, the village has historically had a strategic importance in the area. Curemonte is a member of Les Plus Beaux Villages de France (The Most Beautiful Villages of France) Association. Its inhabitants are called Curemontois.

== Toponymy ==
The name for Curemonte is derived from low Latin Cura montis meaning a location used for an operating estate that's on a mountain or hill.

== History ==
The existence of Curemonte is confirmed from as early as 860 when it was mentioned in the Cartulaire de l'Abbaye de Beaulieu. Rodolphe de Turenne, Archbishop of Bourges, had donated the village of Saint-Genst and its vineyards at Curemonte to the Abbey of Beaulieu.

It was in the 11th century that the village flourished, passing through the Viscounts of Turenne.

== Geography ==
=== Location ===
The municipality of Curemonte is located at the southern end of the department of Corrèze.

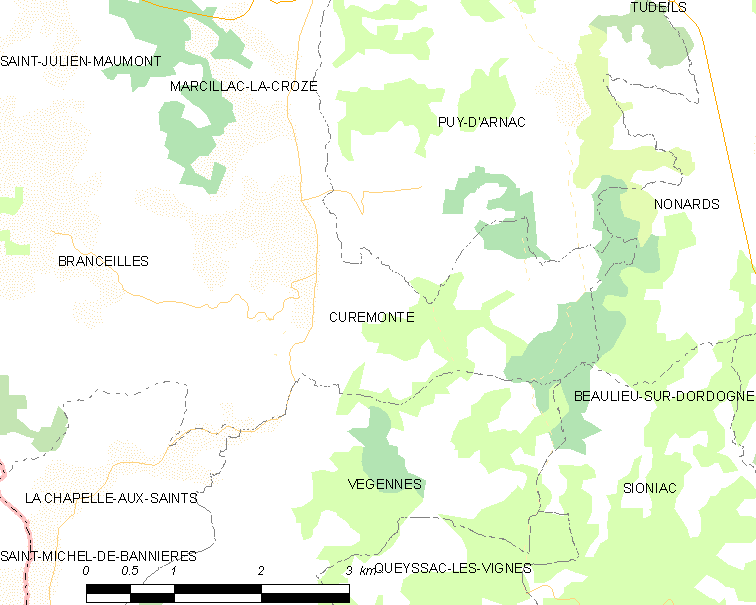
Map of the commune.

=== Physical geography ===
The village of Curemonte is built on a ridge line that overlooks the valleys of the Sourdoire and the Maumont.

== Demographics ==
Historical population
Year	Pop.	±% p.a.
1968	311	—
1975	248	−3.18%
1982	231	−1.01%
1990	203	−1.60%
1999	225	+1.15%
2007	216	−0.51%
2012	216	+0.00%
2017	209	−0.66%
2023	219	+0.78%
Source: INSEE

== Places and monuments ==
- It is ranked among the most beautiful villages in France.
- It has three castles:
  - Châteaux de Saint-Hilaire et des Plas;
  - Château de la Johannie.
- It has three churches:
  - Church of Saint-Barthélemy du Bourg;
  - Church of Saint-Hilaire de la Combe: 11th Century Romanesque church, one of the oldest in the department, which was probably built on Merovingian foundations;
  - The church of Saint-Genest: former parish church, now a Museum of Religious Art.
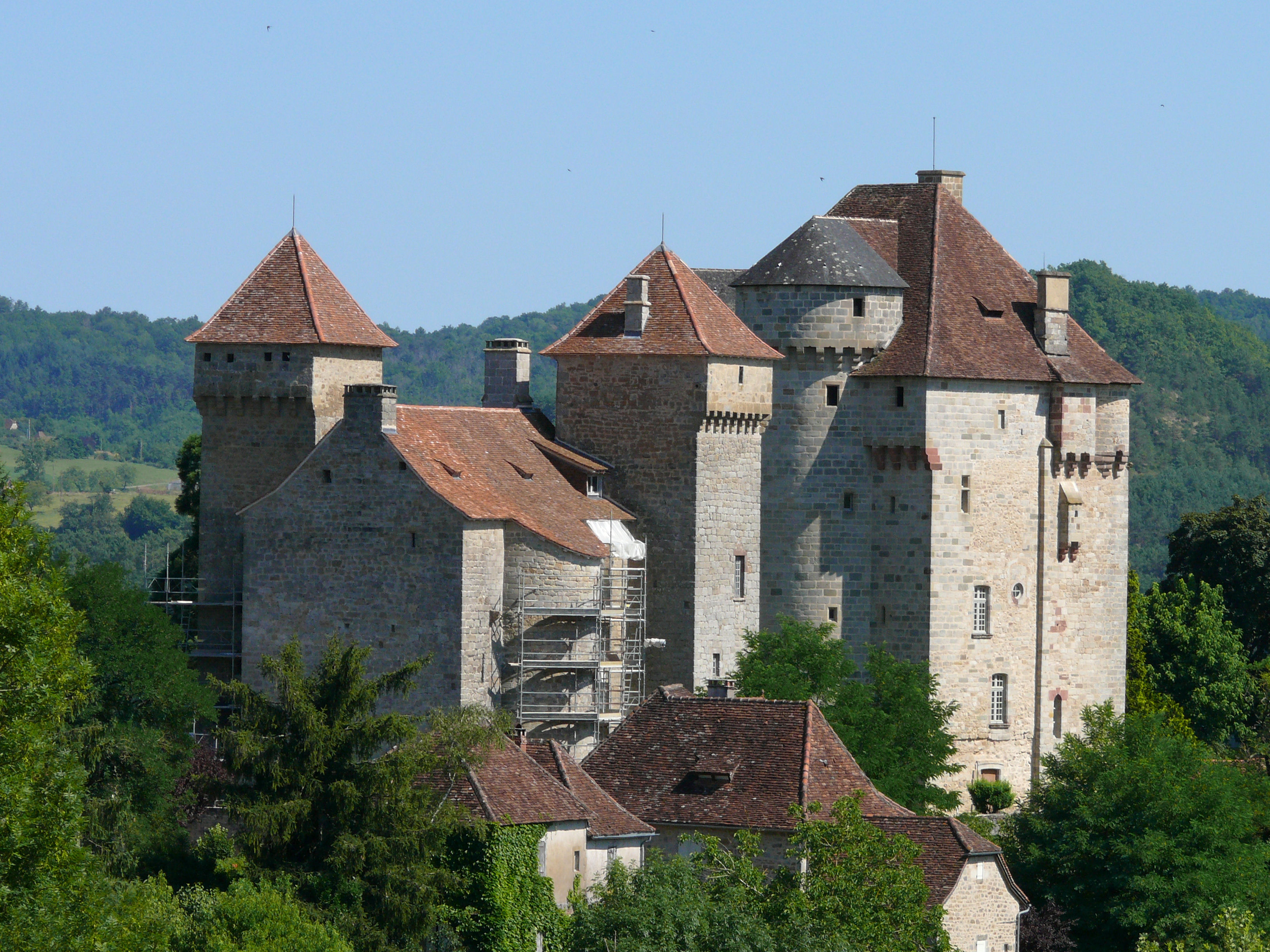
Châteaux de Plas et de Saint-Hilaire.

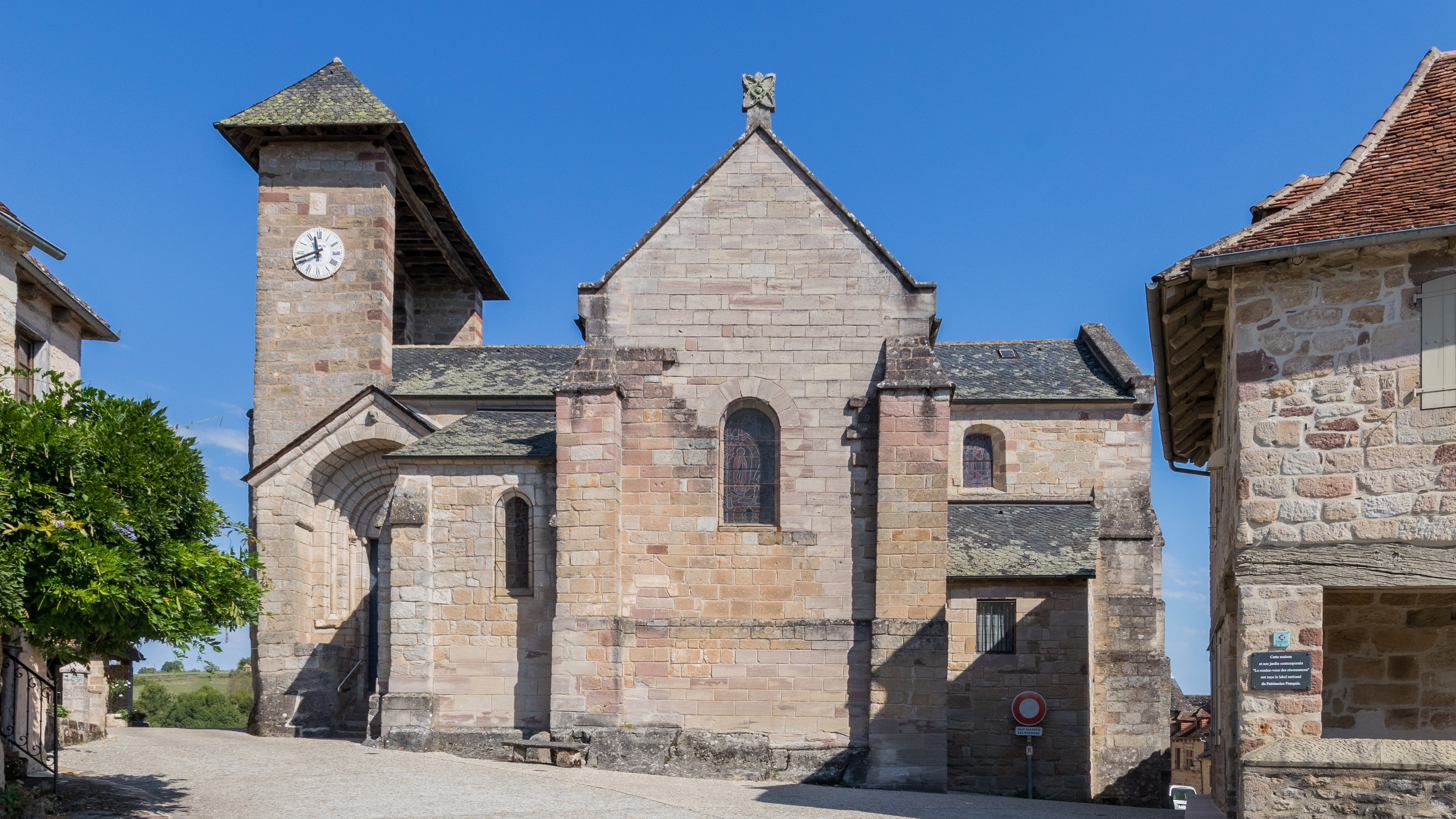
Church of Saint-Barthélemy.

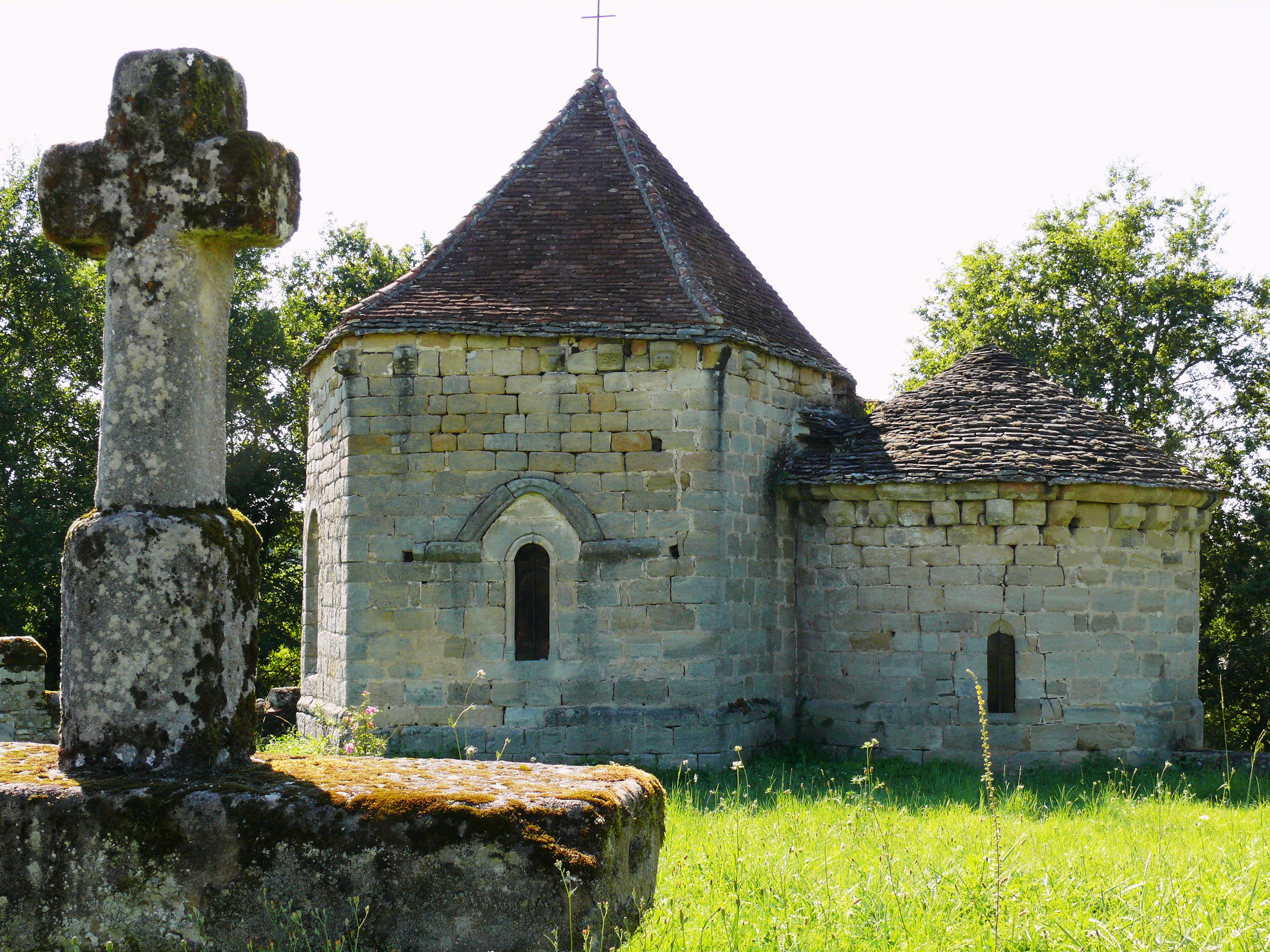
Church of Saint-Hilaire de la Combe.

== See also ==
- Communes of the Corrèze department
