= Saint-Pardoux-les-Cards =

Commune in Nouvelle-Aquitaine, France

- Commune
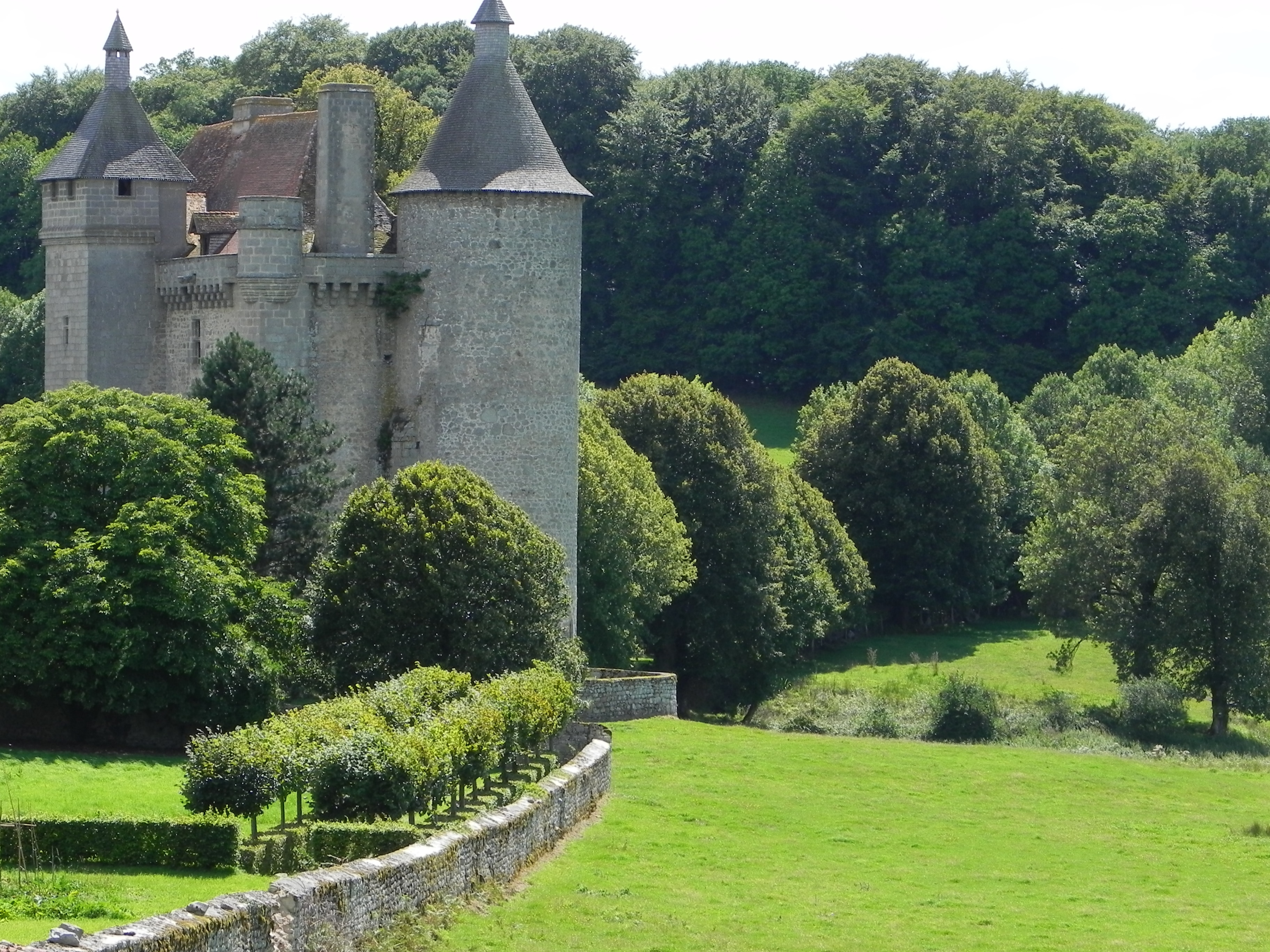
- Chateau of Villemonteix
- Location of Saint-Pardoux-les-Cards
- Location within France Location within Nouvelle-Aquitaine
- Coordinates: 46°05′00″N 2°07′16″E
- Country: France
- Region: Nouvelle-Aquitaine
- Department: Creuse
- Arrondissement: Aubusson
- Canton: Gouzon
- Intercommunality: CC Marche et Combraille en Aquitaine

Government
  - Mayor (2020–2026): Laurent Glomot
- Area^{1}: 24.76 km^{2} (9.56 sq mi)
- Elevation: 394 m (1,293 ft)
- Highest elevation: 566 m (1,857 ft)
- Lowest elevation: 372 m (1,220 ft)
- Population (2023): 291
  - Density: 11.8/km^{2} (30.4/sq mi)
- Time zone: UTC+01:00 (CET)
  - Summer (DST): UTC+02:00 (CEST)
- INSEE/Postal code: 23229 /23150
- ^{1} French Land Register data, which excludes lakes, ponds, glaciers > 1 km^{2} (0.386 sq mi or 247 acres) and river estuaries.

Saint-Pardoux-les-Cards (French pronunciation: [sɛ̃ paʁdu le kaʁ]; Occitan: Sent Pardós los Cars) is a commune in the Creuse department in central France.

== Population ==
Historical population
| Year | Pop. | ±% p.a. |
|---|---|---|
| 1968 | 488 | — |
| 1975 | 449 | −1.18% |
| 1982 | 403 | −1.53% |
| 1990 | 352 | −1.68% |
| 1999 | 298 | −1.83% |
| 2007 | 294 | −0.17% |
| 2012 | 296 | +0.14% |
| 2017 | 287 | −0.62% |
| 2023 | 291 | +0.23% |
Source: INSEE

== See also ==
- Communes of the Creuse department
