= Aubeterre-sur-Dronne =

Aubeterre-sur-Dronne Aubaterra (Occitan)
- Commune
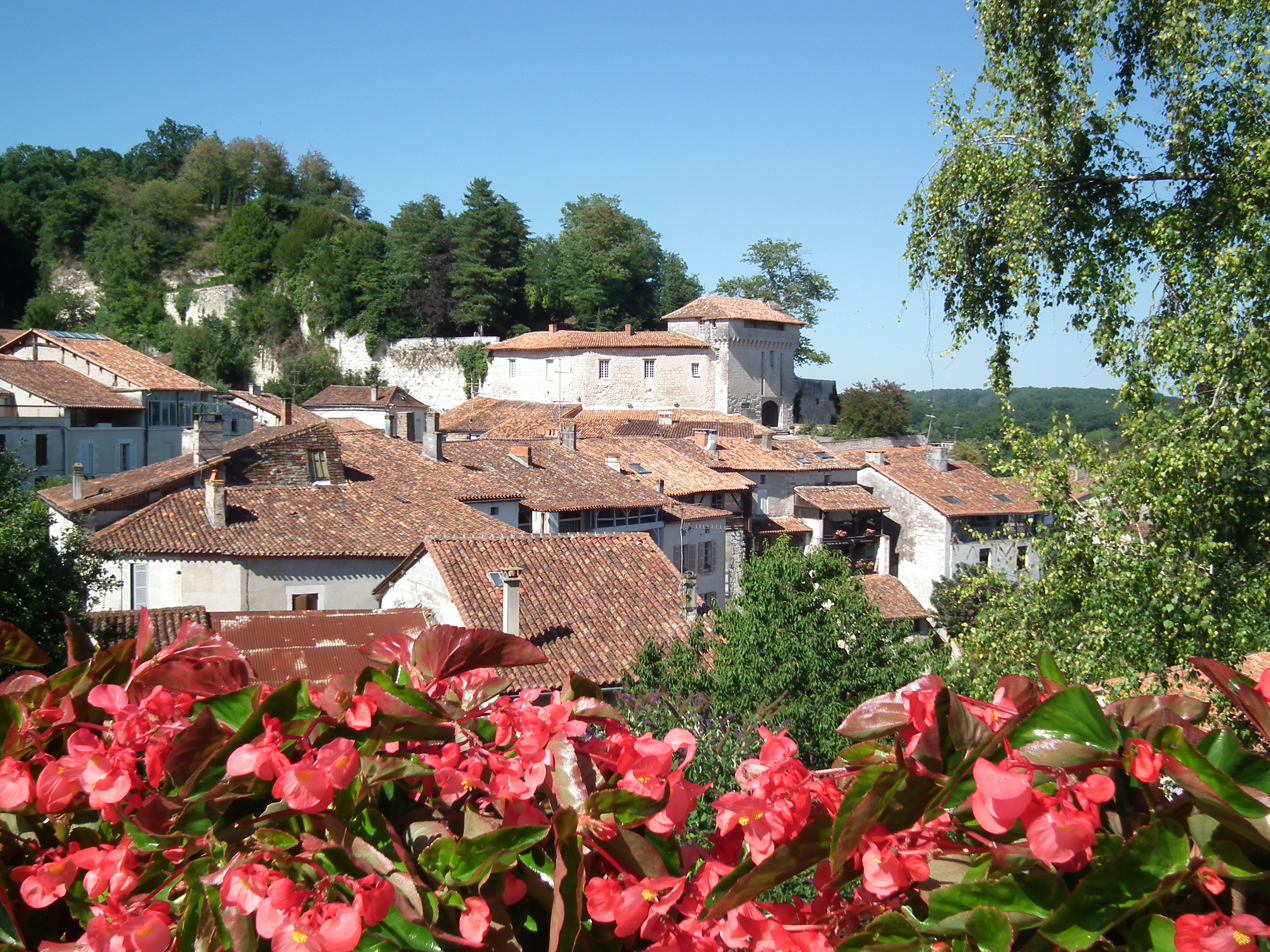
- A view of Aubeterre-sur-Dronne

- Coat of arms
- Location of Aubeterre-sur-Dronne
- Location within France Location within Nouvelle-Aquitaine
- Coordinates: 45°16′21″N 0°10′16″E
- Country: France
- Region: Nouvelle-Aquitaine
- Department: Charente
- Arrondissement: Angoulême
- Canton: Tude-et-Lavalette
- Intercommunality: CC Lavalette Tude Dronne

Government
  - Mayor (2020–2026): Charles Audoin
- Area^{1}: 2.39 km^{2} (0.92 sq mi)
- Elevation: 70 m (230 ft)
- Highest elevation: 112 m (367 ft)
- Lowest elevation: 38 m (125 ft)
- Population (2023): 312
  - Density: 131/km^{2} (338/sq mi)
- Time zone: UTC+01:00 (CET)
  - Summer (DST): UTC+02:00 (CEST)
- INSEE/Postal code: 16020 /16390
- ^{1} French Land Register data, which excludes lakes, ponds, glaciers > 1 km^{2} (0.386 sq mi or 247 acres) and river estuaries.

Aubeterre-sur-Dronne (French pronunciation: [obtɛʁ syʁ dʁɔn], literally Aubeterre on Dronne; Occitan: Aubaterra or Aubaterra de Drona, before 1962: Aubeterre) is a commune in the Charente department in the Nouvelle-Aquitaine region of Southwestern France.

Located on the river Dronne, on the departmental border with Dordogne, Aubeterre-sur-Dronne has been a member of Les Plus Beaux Villages de France (The Most Beautiful Villages of France) Association since 1993. It is well known for its Church of Saint Jean, an underground, Monolithic church. Also popular is the nearby campsite with karaoke and live bands every night that can be heard for miles around.

== Geography ==
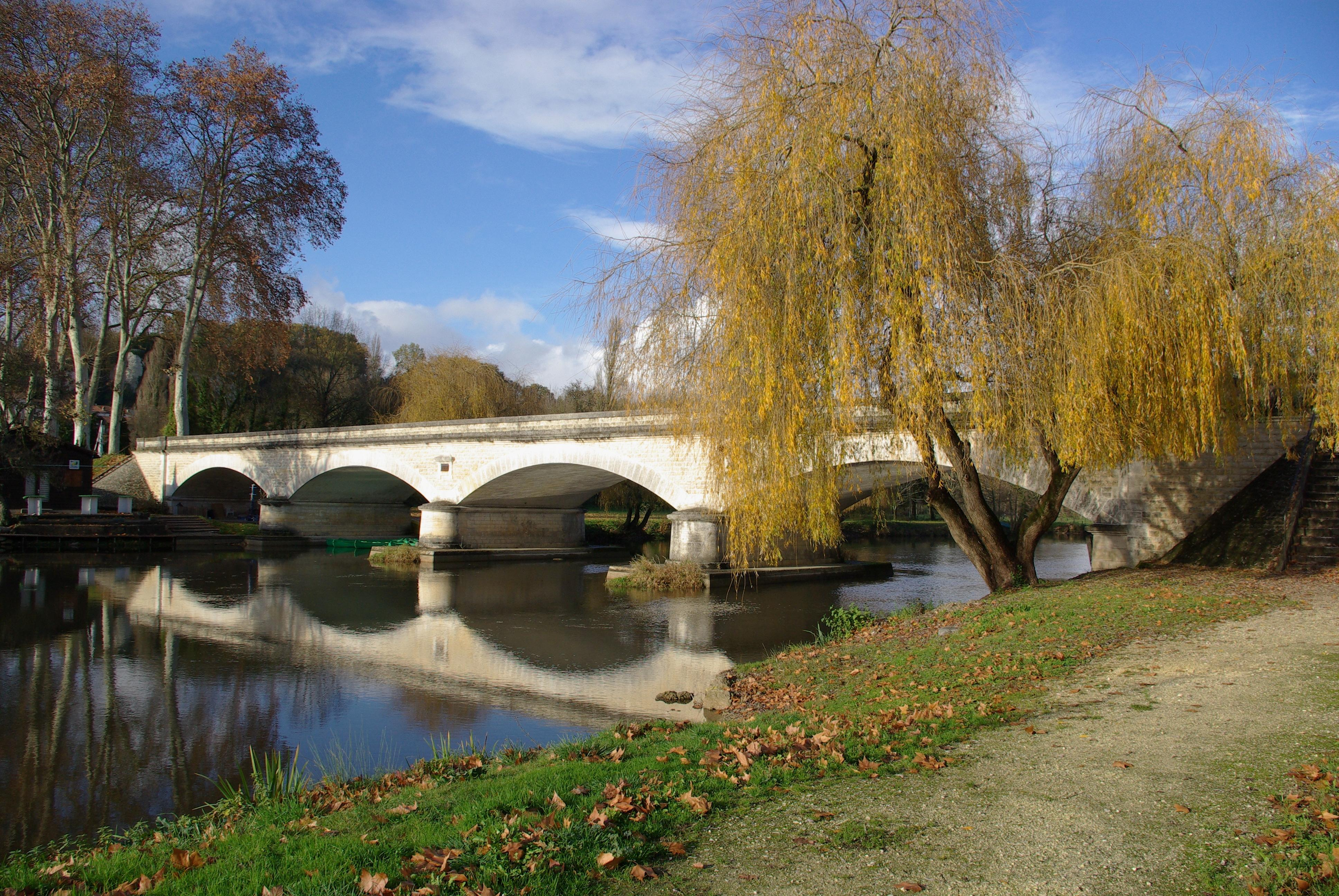
The bridge over the Dronne

Aubeterre-sur-Dronne is located in the extreme southeast of the Charente department some 42 km (26 mi) south of Angoulême, 14 km (8.6 mi) east of Chalais and 16 km (9.9 mi) west by northwest of Ribérac. The entire eastern border is the Dronne river which is the boundary between the Charente and Dordogne departments. Access to the commune is by the departmental road 2 (D2) from Saint-Romain in the west which passes around the village and continues east to Saint-Antoine-Cumond. The departmental road 17 (D17) comes from Laprade in the north passing through the village and then forming the western border of the commune as it goes south to Bonnes. The village is on the northern border of the commune with the rest of the commune entirely farmland.

The commune is part of Les Plus Beaux Villages de France (The Most beautiful villages in France).

The Dronne River forms the entire eastern border of the commune as it flows south to join the Isle at Coutras. In the south of the commune a branch off the Dronne passes through the commune and is called the Astier du Poulard.

=== Geology and terrain ===
The vast area west of the commune is occupied by the slopes of Campanian (Upper Cretaceous) chalky limestone which covers a large part of southern Charente. The hills north of the town are covered with Tertiary deposits of sand, clay, and pebbles. The lower part of the commune in the Dronne valley is covered with alluvium from the Quaternary period, the oldest of which have accumulated in terraces and the most recent is on the flood plain.

Aubeterre is on a hill in the concave bank of a meander of the River Dronne and forms a spur to the south.

The highest point of the commune is at an altitude of 111m and is located on the plateau near the northern boundary. The lowest point is 38m located on the southern boundary next to the Dronne. The commune is spread between the valley of the Dronne and the top of the hill.

== Toponymy ==
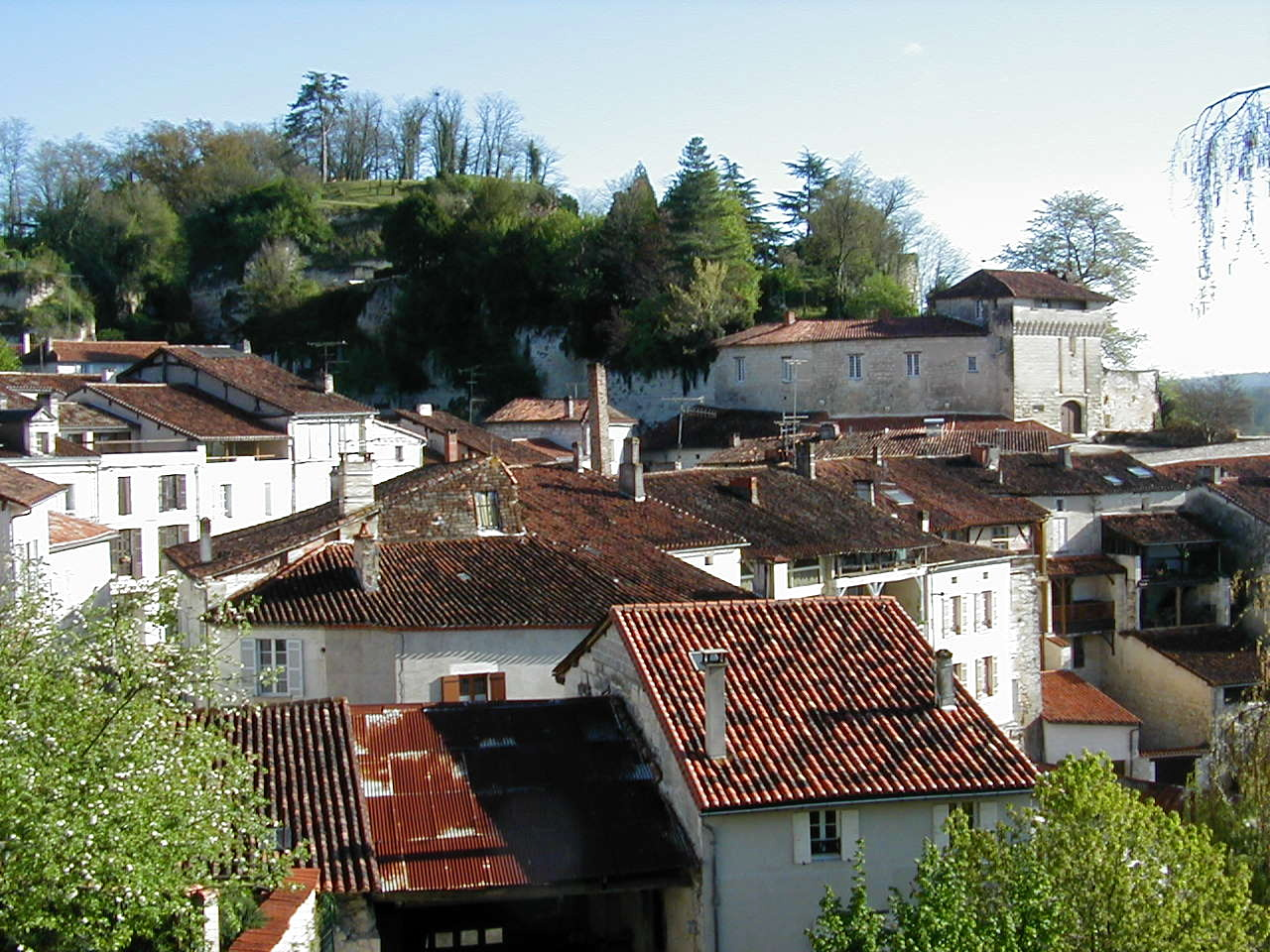
Limestone cliffs overlooking the village rooftops

The name Aubeterre is derived from Albaterra which dates to 1004. Alba Terra means "White earth" which comes from the white chalk rock face overlooking the village.

Aubeterre is located in the Occitan part of Charente and its name in Occitan is Aubaterra (Limousin dialect).

== History ==
=== Middle Ages ===
There has been a lordship of Aubeterre since the 11th century. The first known lord was Géraud at the beginning of that century. Aimeri d'Aubeterre was the name of a monk at the Abbey of Saint-Cybard.

On the hill on top of the white chalk cliffs the lords of Aubeterre erected a castle above the monolithic Church of Saint-Jean in the 12th century. Aubeterre was then a Viscounty which passed by marriage to Pierre II from the house of Castillon.

In 1246, the lord of Aubeterre recognized Hugh X of Lusignan - the Count of Angoulême - as his Suzerain.

In 1278, Pierre V was stripped of the Viscounty of Aubeterre and paid homage to the Count of Angoulême. His youngest daughter married Pierre Raymond, Lord of Ozillac, who thus became Viscount of Aubeterre. The Raymond family retained Aubeterre throughout the 14th century and was on the side of the King of France against the English during the Hundred Years War.

In September 1346, during the Hundred Years War, the Earl of Derby took the village.

The King of England, Edward III, gave the Lord of Mussidan custody of the village, which he retained in 1360 at the Treaty of Brétigny which retro-ceded Angoumois to England as well as Saintonge. (Note: Aubeterre, the gateway to Périgord, was also the gateway to Saintonge, since at that time the province included Barbezieux, Montmoreau, and Chalais. After the Treaty of Brétigny all the English possessions in Aquitaine were called Guyenne.)

Viscount Gardrad Raymond, the son of Pierre Raymond, swore allegiance to Edward of Woodstock, Prince of Wales on 29 September 1363.

In 1366, Aubeterre was one of nine castellanies in the Seneschal of Angoumois which was held by the English Seneschal Henri de la Haye. (Note: Other castellanies were: Angoulême, Bouteville, Villebois, Merpins, Jarnac, Cognac, and La Tour-Blanche.) Between 1356 and 1412 the lordship of Aubeterre changed hands seven times between the English and the French. Gardrad Raymond, lord of Aubeterre, was a great recruiter and headed bands of Anglo-Gascons before being engaged by Bertrand Du Guesclin to go to war with Spain in 1366.

The granddaughter of Gardrad Raymond married Guy Bouchard, a knight, and Aubeterre remained in the hands of the Bouchard family for the next two centuries.

=== Modern Times (16th–18th century) ===
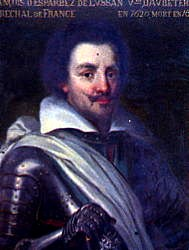
François d'Esparbès de Lussan d'Aubeterre

After the wars of religion were over the Viscount of Aubeterre, François Bouchard, embraced the Protestant party with ardour. The assassin of Henry I, Duke of Guise, Jean de Poltrot, was one of his pages. François Bouchard fled to Geneva with his wife and Aubeterre was taken by the Duke of Anjou. His son, David Bouchard, returned from exile in Switzerland. He was supported by the Viscount of Bourdeilles, Seneschal of Périgord, who gave him his daughter Renée in marriage which then brought him to the Catholic religion. The young Viscount of Aubeterre died in 1593 as a result of a wound received at the siege of Lisle in Perigord by Leaguers.

Their only daughter Hippolyte married François d'Esparbes de Lussan in 1597 who became Viscount of Aubeterre. This remarkable man had Protestant ideas unlike his father and was the faithful companion of Henri IV both before and after his accession to the throne. He helped him to regain his kingdom against the Catholic League. He obtained the governance of Blaye and in 1612 he was Governor and Seneschal of Agenais and Condomois and was made Marshal of France in 1620.

He rebuilt the castle (the pavilion containing the chapel, gatehouses, and the round tower) and created a Marquisate in Aubeterre. He died in January 1628 in his castle.

He had twelve children including seven boys. Succession gave rise to a long process which was ended in 1650 by a decree of the Parliament of Paris which stipulated that all property would be shared between the two eldest sons. The elder branch, which descended from Henri Joseph Bouchard d'Esparbès de Lussan d'Aubeterre, retained the title of Marquis of Aubeterre. The younger son took the title of Count of Aubeterre and lived in the Château de Bonnes.

In the 18th century the jurisdiction of Aubeterre extended over 19 parishes and 40 fiefs. The religious chapter depended on the Diocese of Périgueux and the Protestant church on the Synod of Angoumois.

=== Contemporary era ===
At the beginning of the 20th century Aubeterre had a station on the Parcoul to Riberac railway line.

=== Heraldry ===
| Arms of Aubeterre-sur-Dronne | Blazon: Lozengy of Or and Azure, in chief Gules. |

== Administration ==
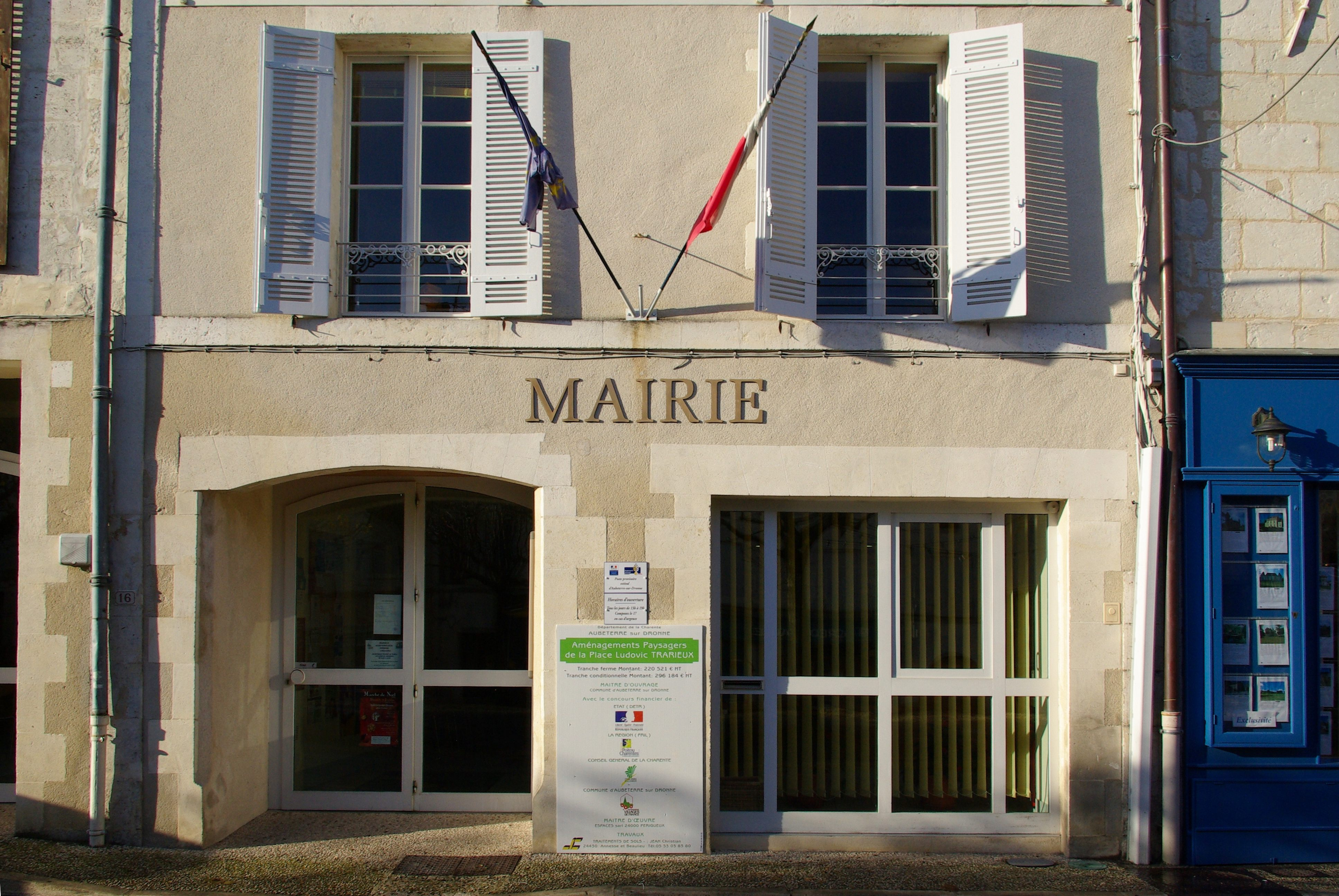
The Town Hall

List of Successive Mayors

| From | To | Name | Party | Position |
|---|---|---|---|---|
| 2001 | 2004 | Pierre-Marcel Benoit | | |
| 2004 | | Jacques Mercier | | |

== Demography ==
Its inhabitants are known as Aubeterriens (masculine) or Aubeterriennes (feminine) in French.

Historical population

| Year | Pop. | ±% p.a. |
|---|---|---|
| 1793 | 699 | — |
| 1821 | 725 | +0.13% |
| 1846 | 768 | +0.23% |
| 1872 | 731 | −0.19% |
| 1901 | 714 | −0.08% |
| 1926 | 530 | −1.18% |
| 1946 | 529 | −0.01% |
| 1962 | 446 | −1.06% |
| 1968 | 449 | +0.11% |

| Year | Pop. | ±% p.a. |
|---|---|---|
| 1975 | 419 | −0.98% |
| 1982 | 398 | −0.73% |
| 1990 | 388 | −0.32% |
| 1999 | 365 | −0.68% |
| 2007 | 422 | +1.83% |
| 2012 | 416 | −0.29% |
| 2017 | 386 | −1.49% |
| 2023 | 312 | −3.49% |

Source: EHESS and INSEE

== Culture and heritage ==
=== Civil heritage ===
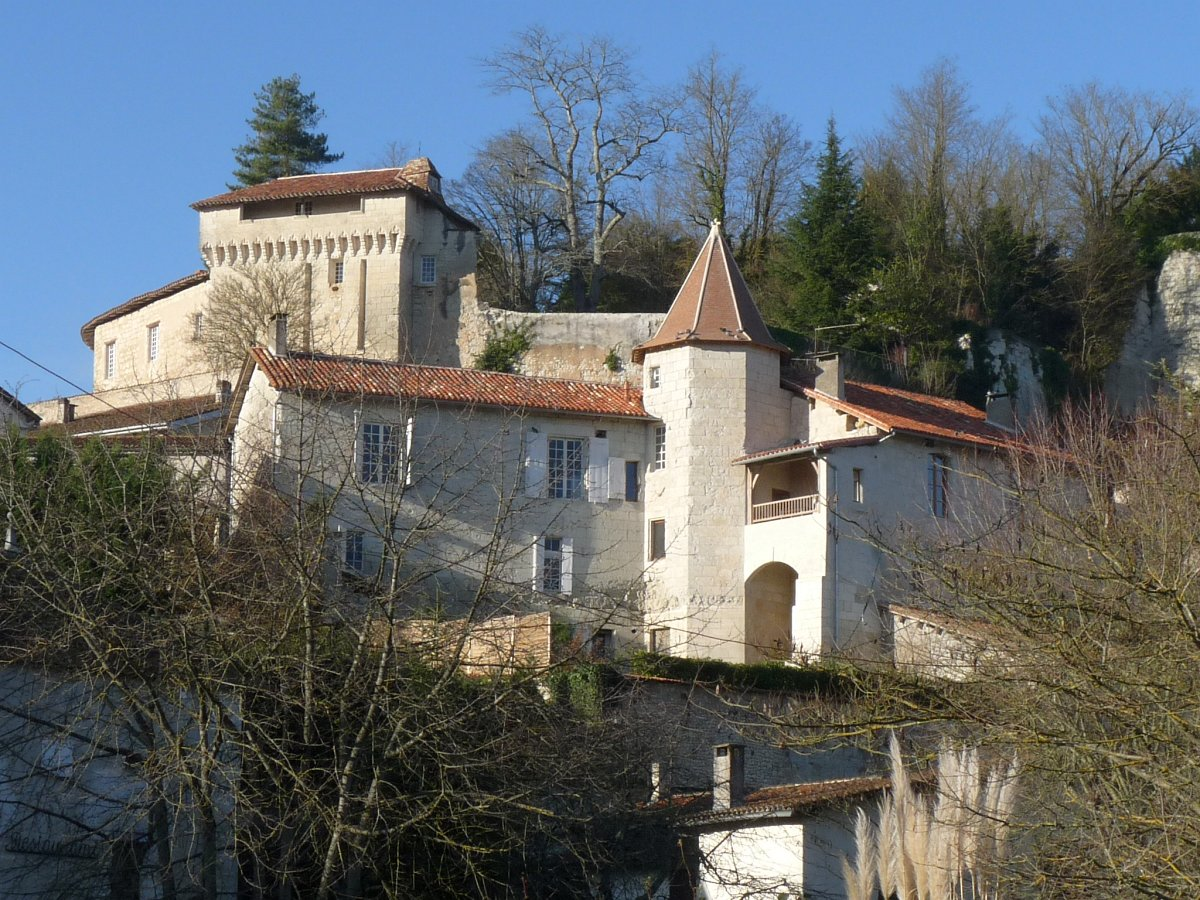
View of the Chateau

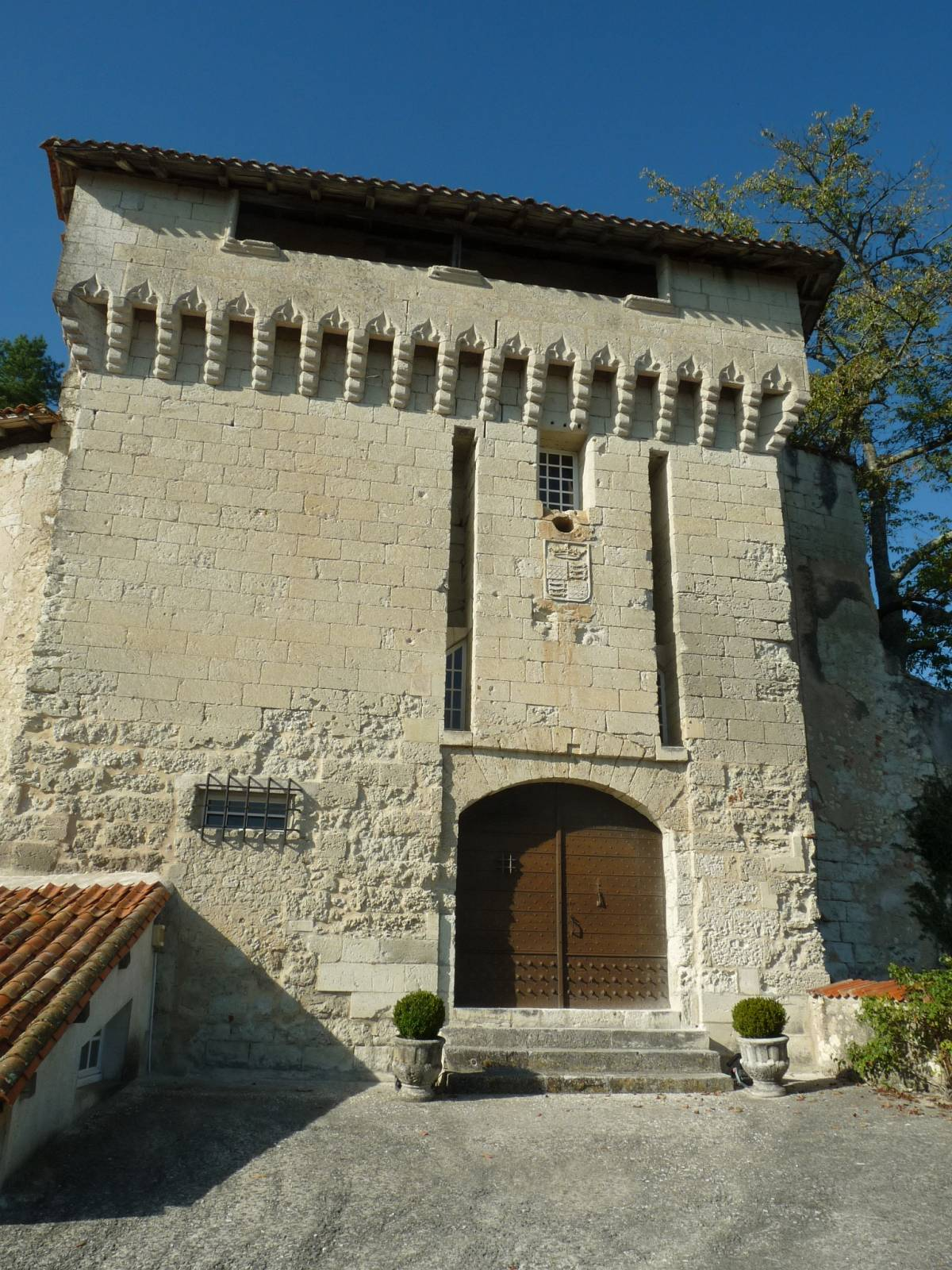
The gatehouse of the château

- The Chateau d'Aubeterre (11th century)

Built on a rocky promontory and controlling the valley of the Dronne as well as being the meeting point of three provinces (Angoumois, Saintonge, and Périgord), the Chateau d'Aubeterre is mentioned in writings from 1004.

The main remnant of the chateau is the gatehouse: a rectangular tower of solid appearance rebuilt in the 16th century. It retains an appearance specific to medieval buildings including battlements and two vertical grooves on either side of the portal - the ultimate evidence of a former drawbridge. The whole is completed by the remains of four circular towers, part of the defensive walls, a small lodgings house, a Renaissance chapel, and some parts of an old curtain wall.

- The Place Merkès-Merval owes its name to two opera-stars from 1940 to 1990: Marcel Merkès and Paulette Merval. This small place is known for its traditional houses with wooden balconies "in Spanish style". In the centre is an old Lavoir (public laundry). An arched way leads to the Place Trarieux named after Ludovic Trarieux, the founder of the Ligue française pour la défense des droits de l'homme et du citoyen (French League for the Defence of the Rights of Man and of the Citizen) who was a native of Aubeterre. This small plaza is lined with ancient houses, and there is a niche housing a statue of the Sacred Heart of Jesus.
- The Tower of the Apostles (or Henri IV Tower): it was in this tower that Henri of Navarre would have slept on the eve of the Battle of Coutras.

=== Religious heritage ===
- The Minimes Convent, founded in 1617, is now a retirement home. The Chapel (open to the public) combines classical and late Gothic architectural elements. There is a Retable in monumental stone, which shall include representatives of angels holding in their hands suns. The cloister adjoining the chapel has pure and simple lines and is modelled after the Minimes Convent of Blaye.

The Altar and Retable (17th century) are registered as an historical object.

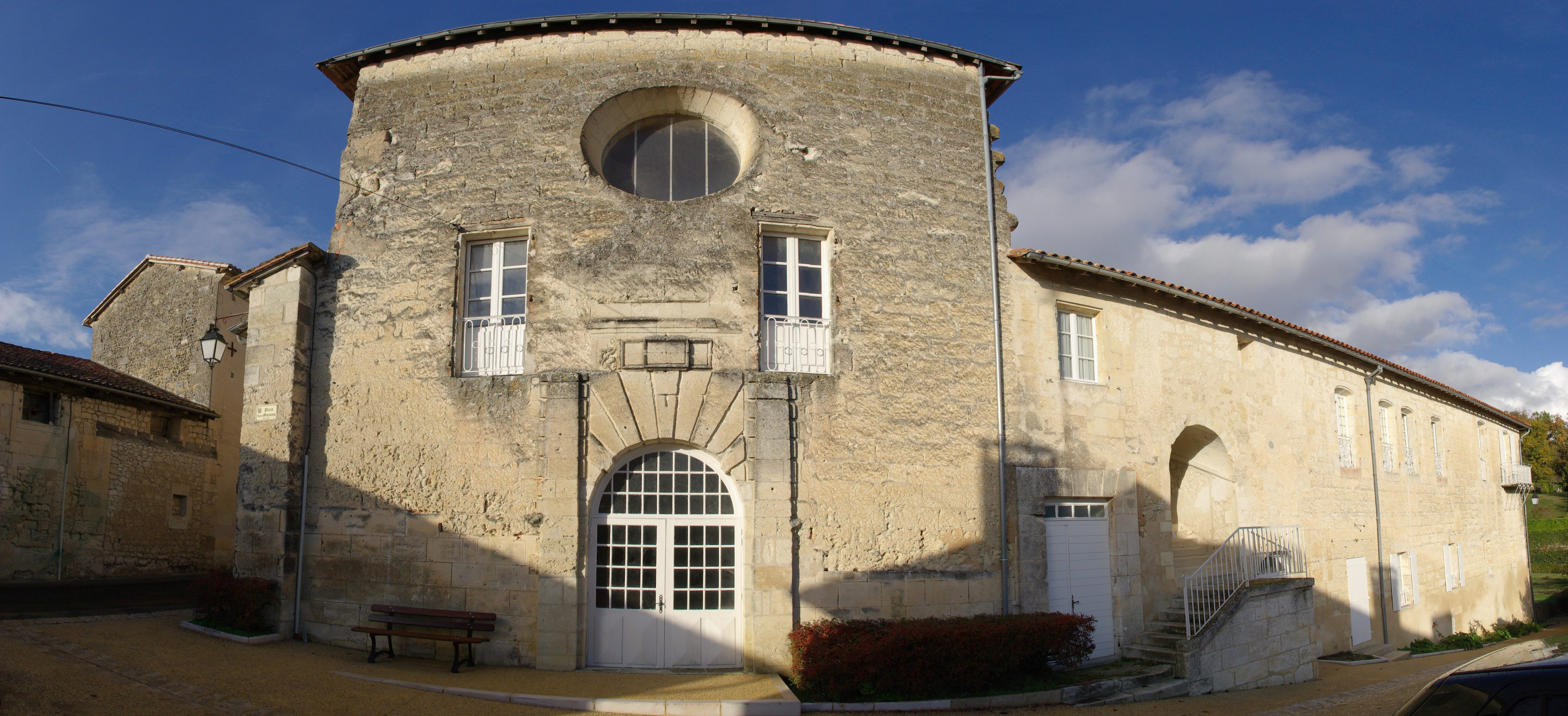
Minimes Convent

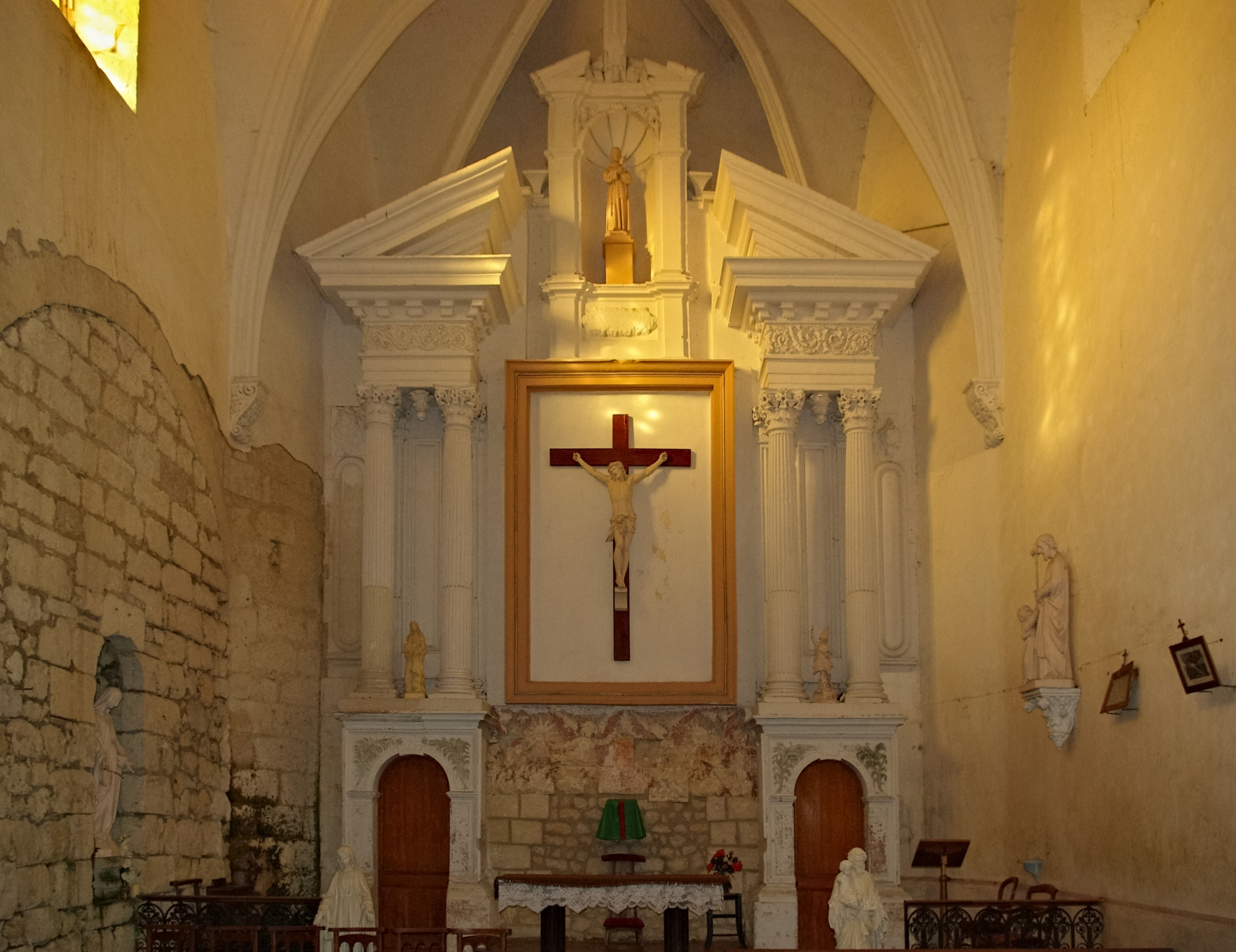
Minimes Convent Chapel Altar

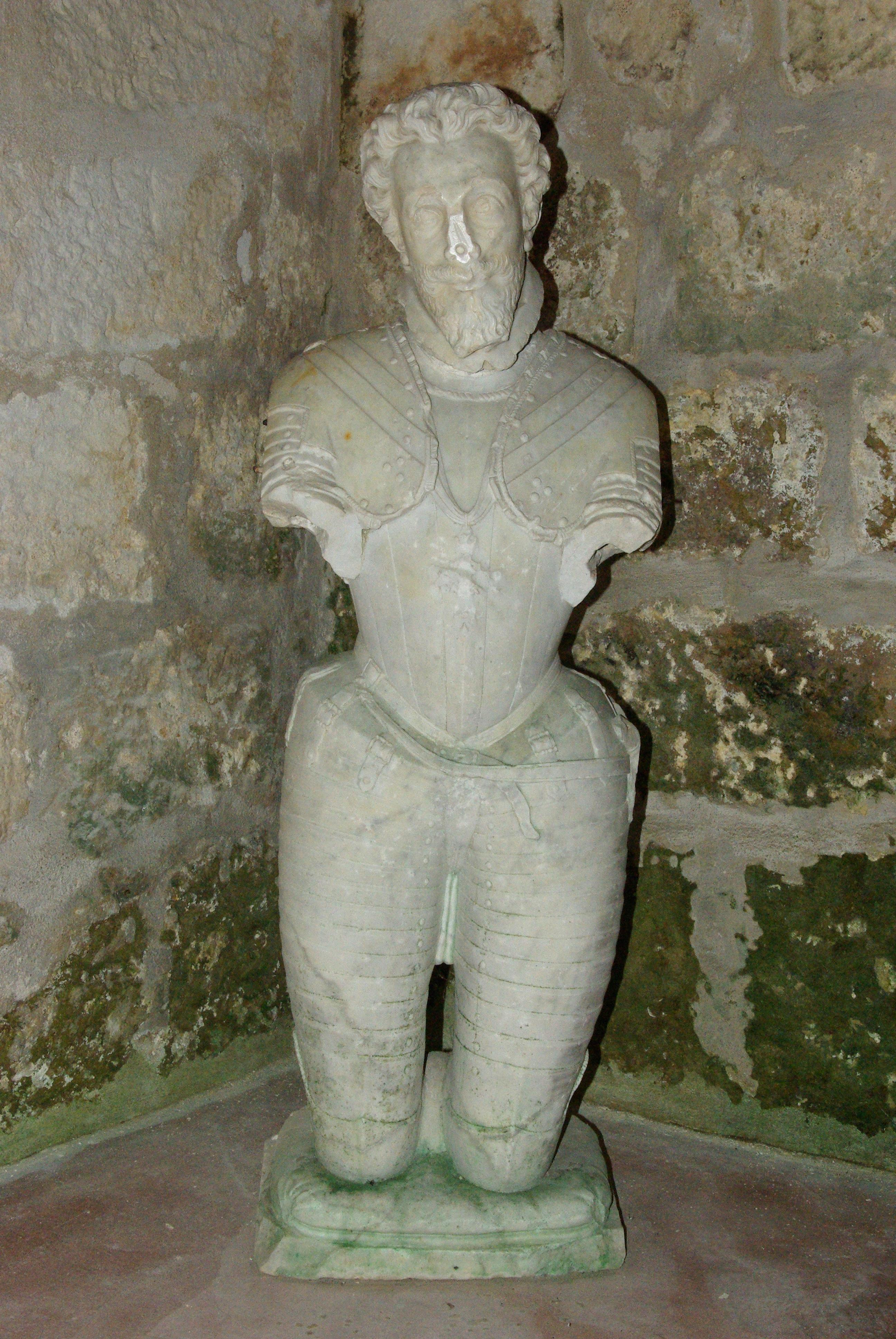
Tomb effigy in the Reliquary of the Minimes Convent

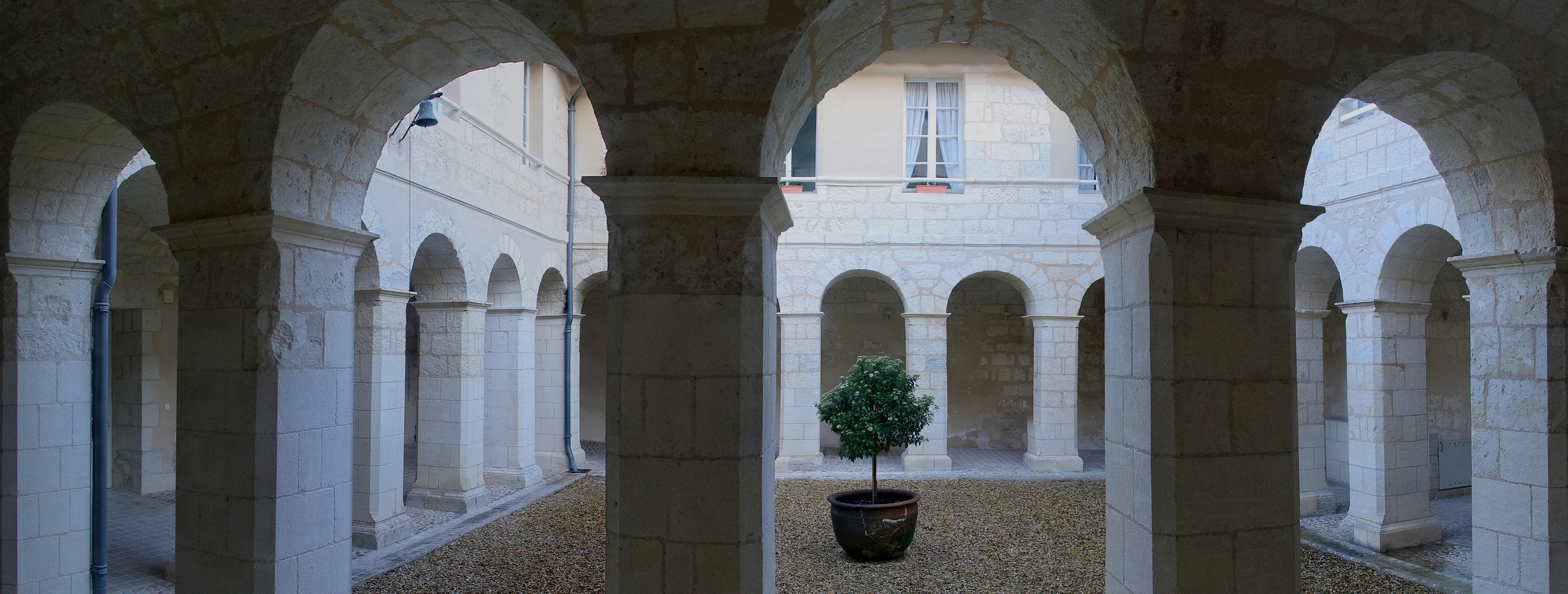
View of the cloistres in Minimes Convent

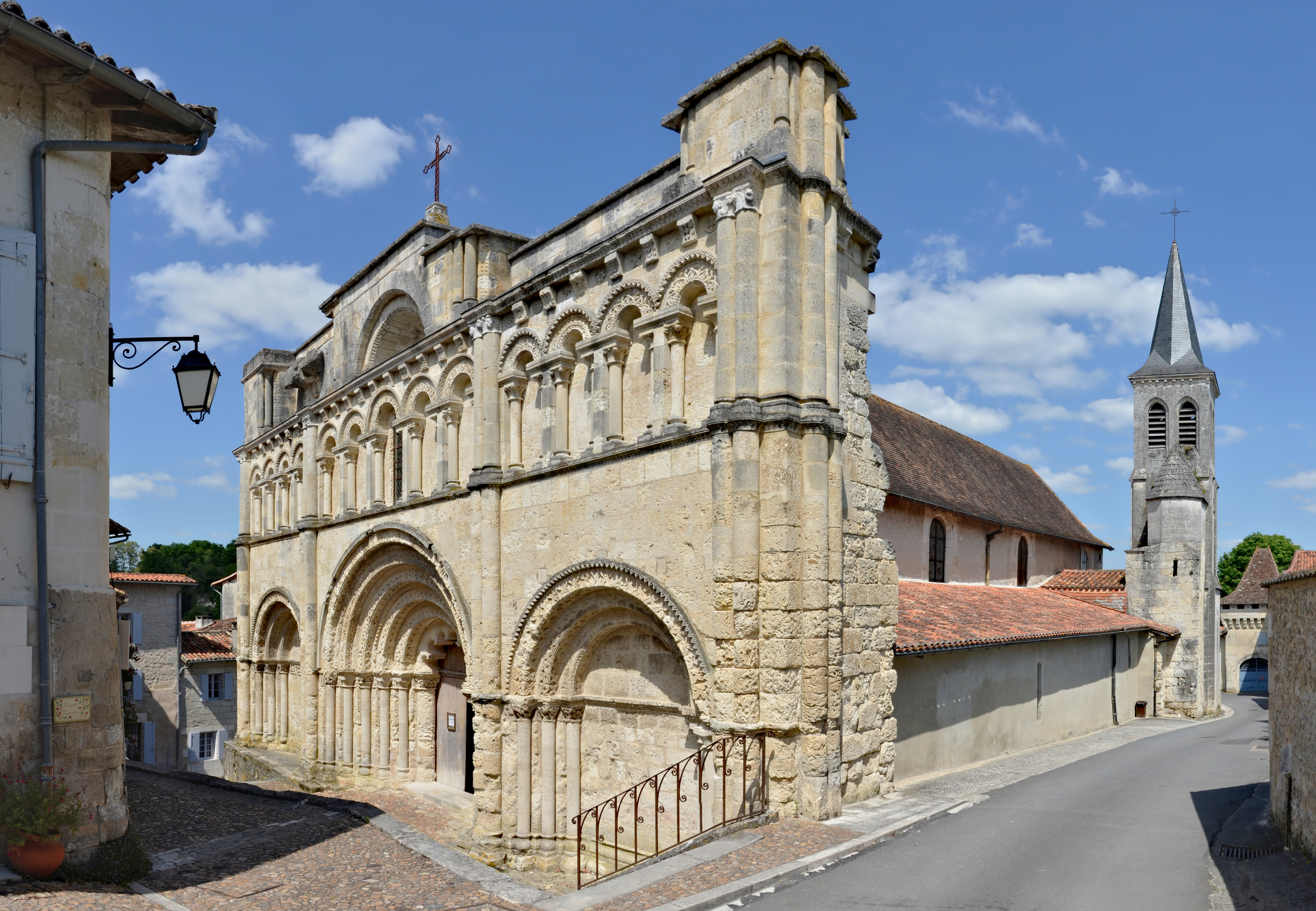
The Church of Saint-Jacques

- The Church of Saint-Jacques (12th century) was seriously damaged during the Wars of religion (13 and 14 May 1562) and was almost completely rebuilt in 1710. Nevertheless, it has an imposing Saintonge Romanesque facade dating to the 12th century. 18.40 metres long and 12 metres high, it is divided into three horizontal and vertical sections punctuated by large arches and spaces between the columns.

The lobed arch in the portal shows Hispano-Moorish influences and includes five arches decorated with geometric patterns. The upper parts include a Zodiac, a Romanesque arch (which probably once held statues of the twelve apostles, now gone), and symbolic representations (e.g. Coquilles Saint-Jacques) of a stage on the Way of St. James to Saint Jacques de Compostela.

The interior of the church is very sober and divided into three aisles - the whole being covered with exposed timbers. The flat chevet is pierced by a large bay in which modern stained glass was installed in 1970. The south aisle houses a Madonna with child from the 16th century.

The Church of Saint-Jacques contains many items that are registered as historical objects:

- 2 Bronze Bells (1673)
- A Bronze Bell (1600)
- A Lectern (17th century)
- A Statue: Virgin and Child (18th century)
- 2 Statues: Angels adoring (18th century)
- An Altar with two tiers (18th century)
- A Winged Tabernacle (18th century)
- A Statue:Virgin and Child (19th century)
- 2 Choir Candlesticks (13th century)
- A Capital (12th century)

The Church of Saint-Jacques gallery

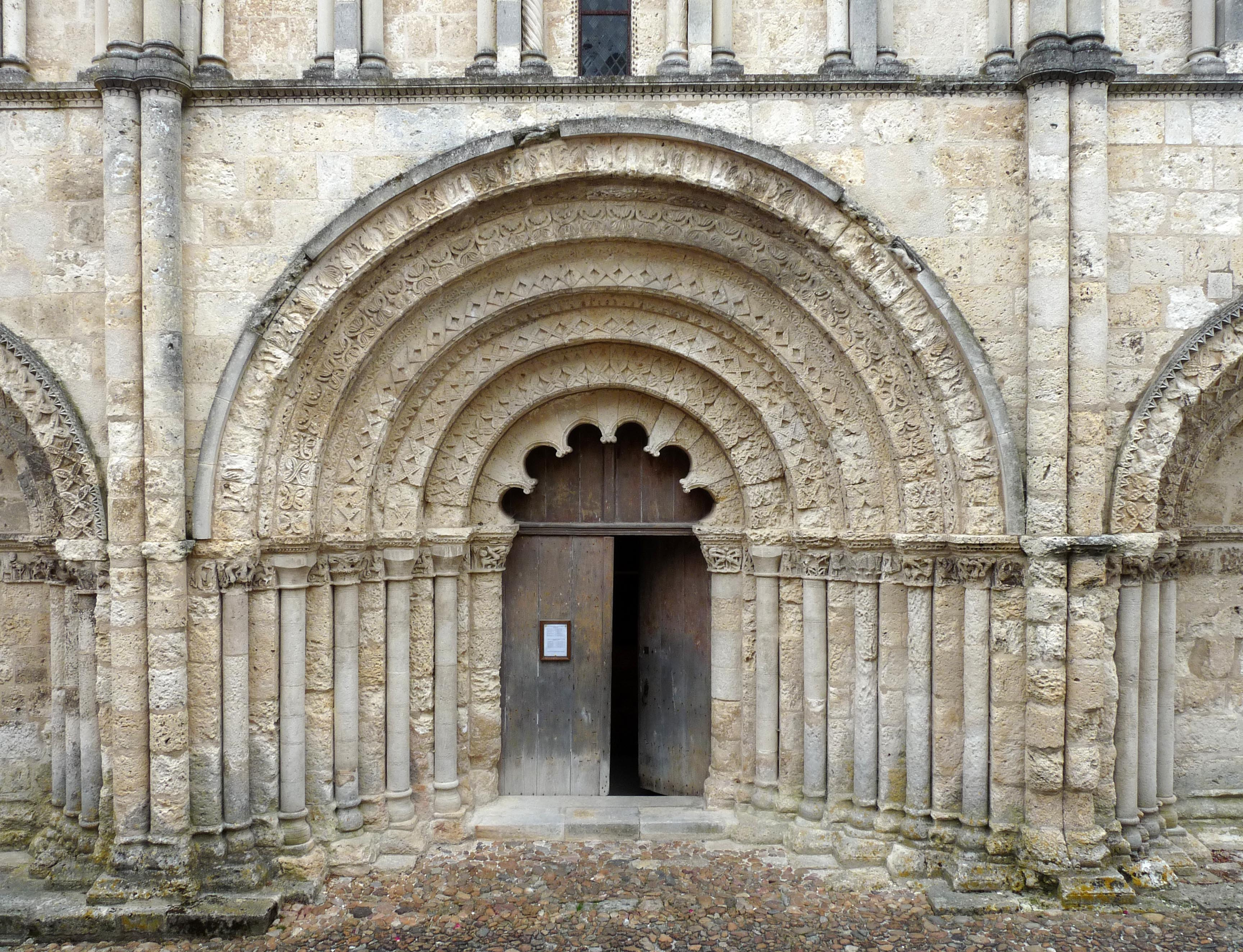
Entrance to the Church

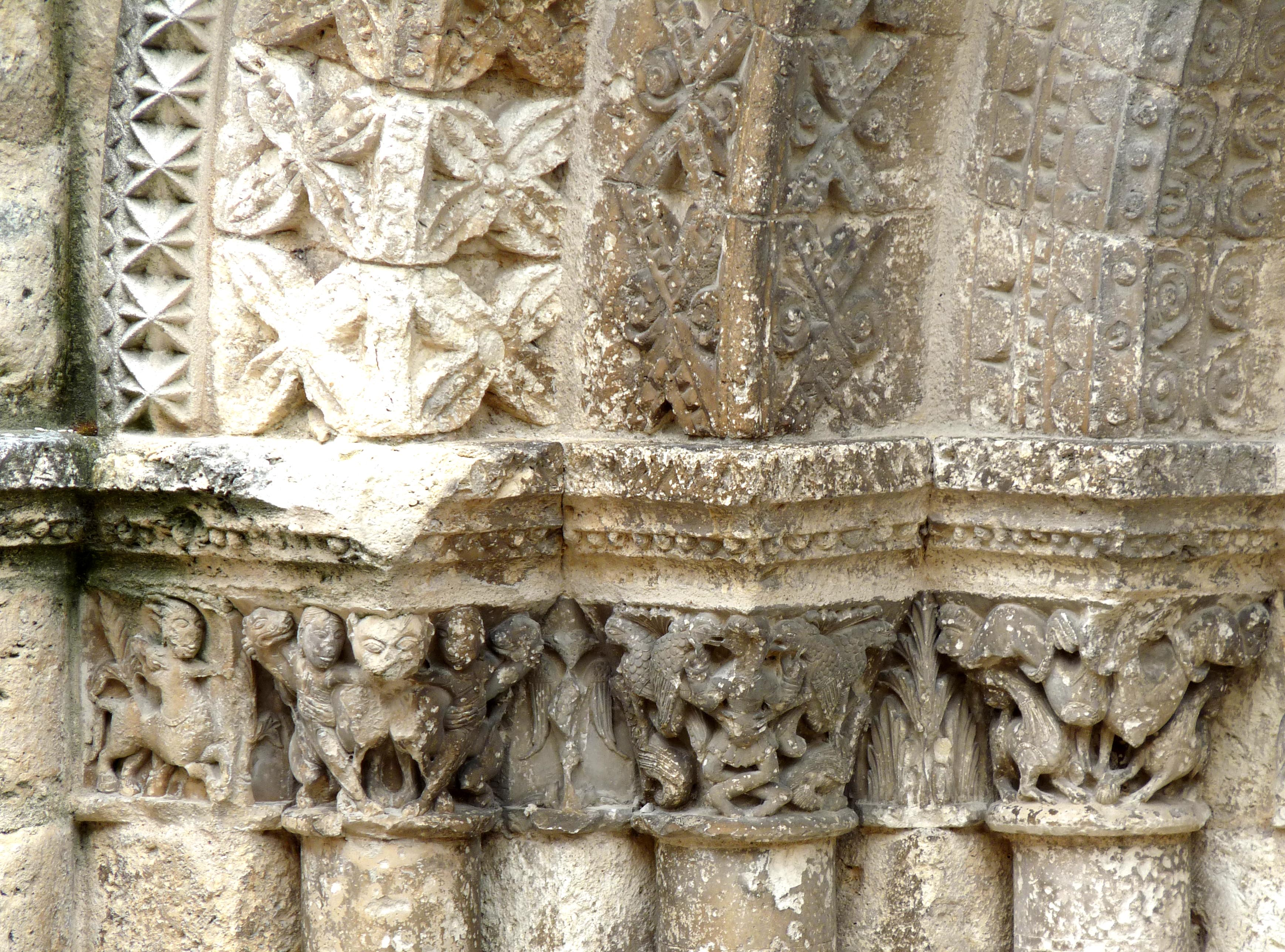
Church Capitals

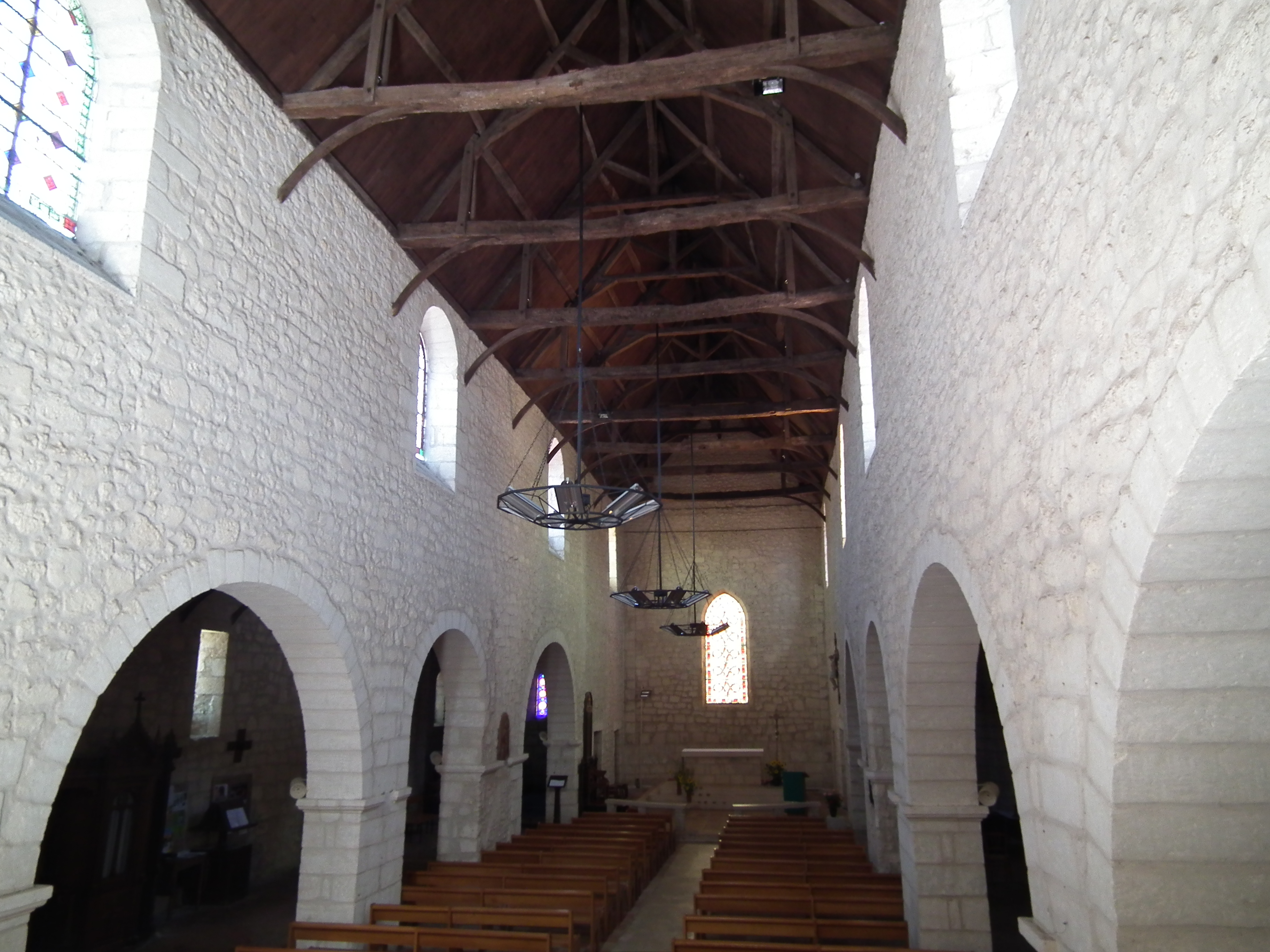
The exposed timber ceiling

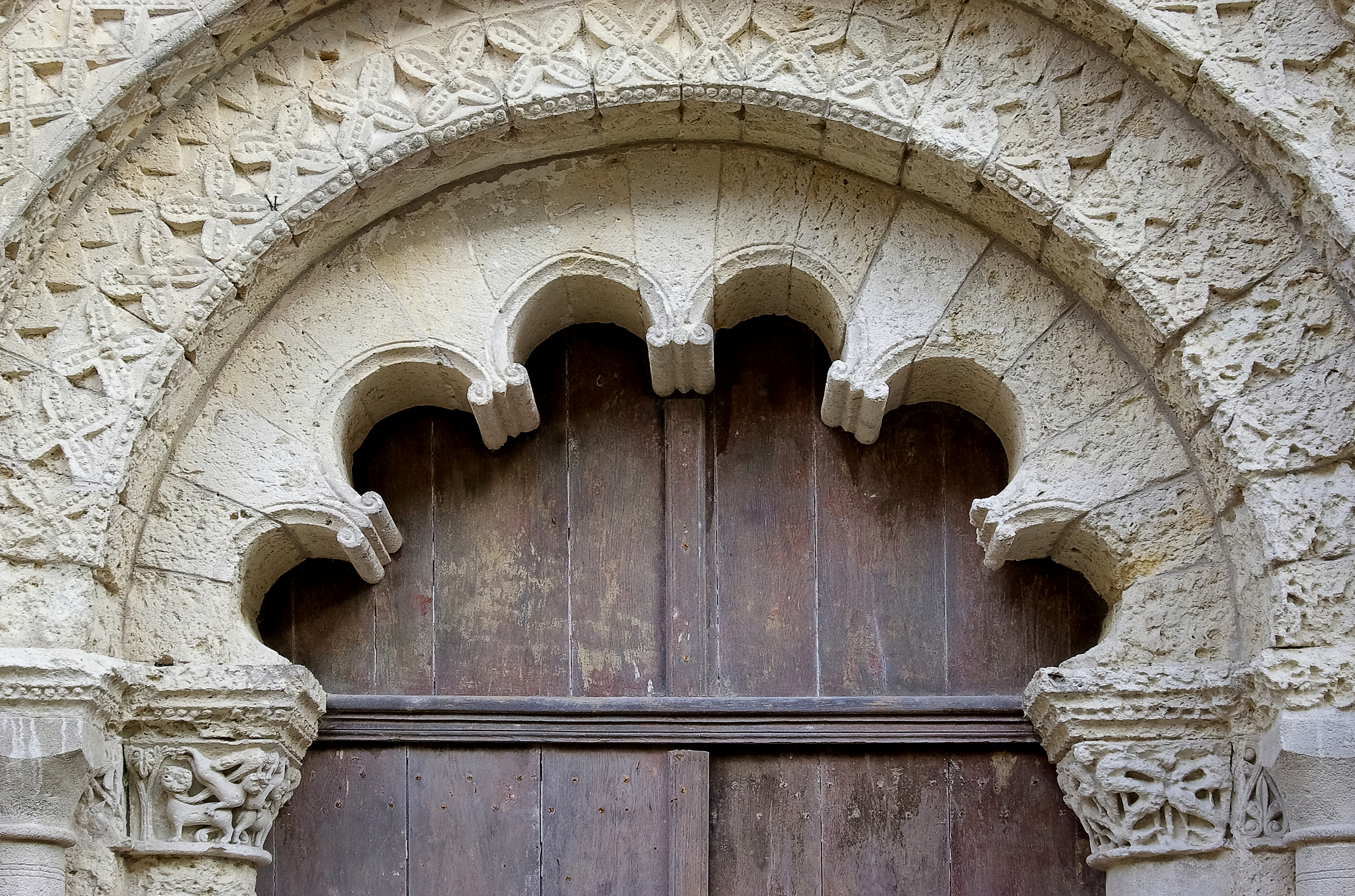
Lobed arch over the entrance

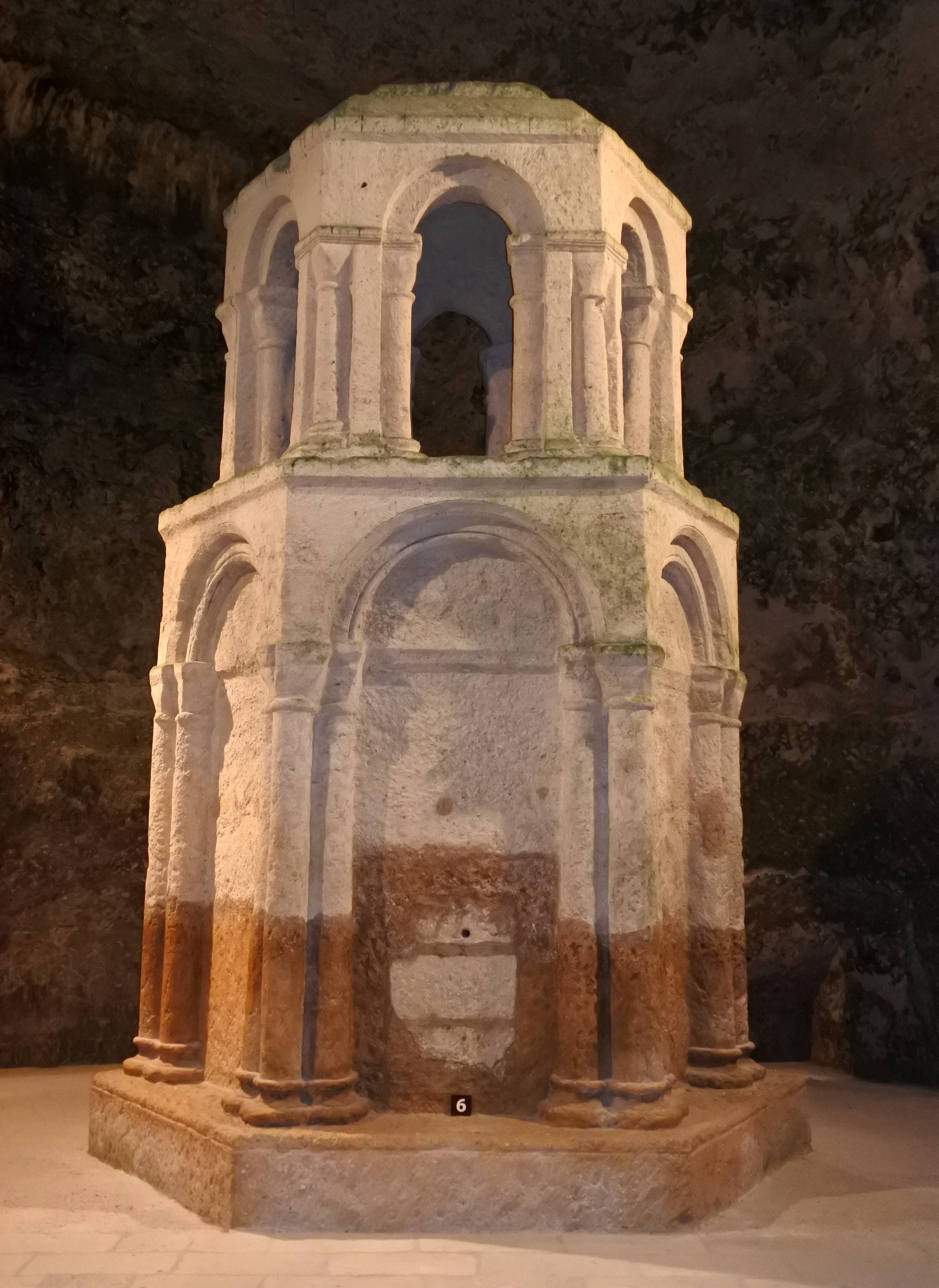
Reliquary in the Church of Saint-Jean, Aubeterre-sur-Dronne.

- The Subterranean Monolithic Church (7th century)

The subterranean monolithic church of Saint-Jean is an underground church carved into a cliff overlooking the Dronne in the 7th century and greatly enlarged in the 12th century by a community of Benedictine monks. From the nave to the centre of the vault with its semi-circular arches is nearly 20 metres. At about 15 metres high it is bordered on three sides by a gallery, a kind of triforium, which is accessed by a staircase carved into the rock. A series of large arches and massive columns (from an octagonal base to a square at the top level) mark the separation with the lateral nave.

This cave church has unique furniture comprising an imposing stone reliquary (6 metres high) - a masterpiece of Romanesque art, a cave of relics, an early Christian baptismal font decorated with a Greek cross, and a crypt. The original chapel, carved in the 7th century contains nearly 80 medieval sarcophagi. These tombs were discovered between 1958 and 1961. Burials were performed in the nave until 1865 when the practice was prohibited for reasons of public health.

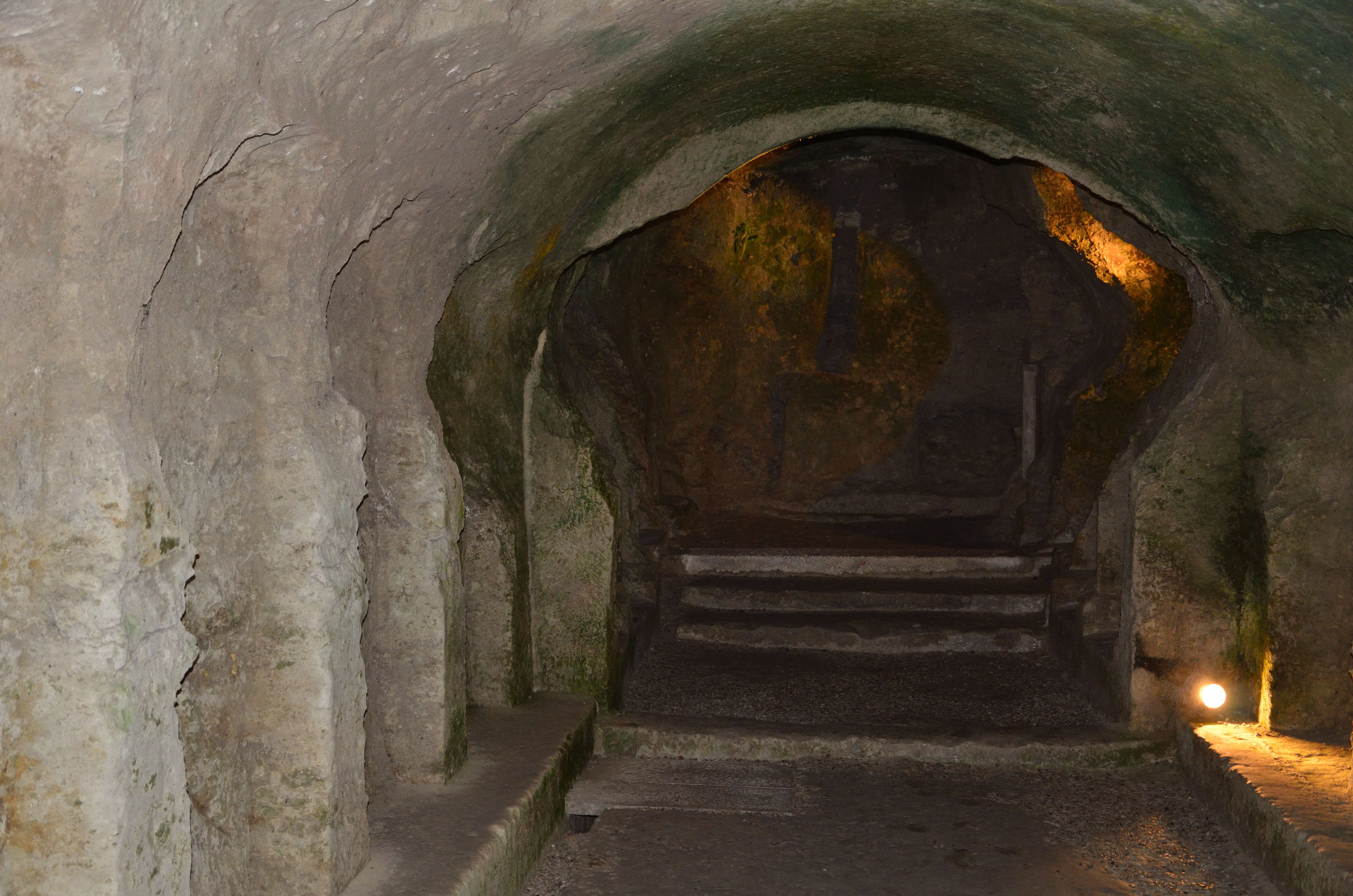
Crypt of the Subterranean Church of Saint-Jean where there is an image

The Subterranean monolithic church of Saint-Jean is one of the main rock-hewn churches of France. It has two "sisters" in the region: the Monolithic church of Saint-Émilion and the Chapel of the Hermitage of Saint-Martial at Mortagne-sur-Gironde.

The Church of Saint-Jean contains the tomb of François d'Esparbes de Lussan, Marshal of Aubeterre, and Hippolyte Bouchard which is registered as a historical object.

The Subterranean Monolithic Church of Saint-Jean Gallery

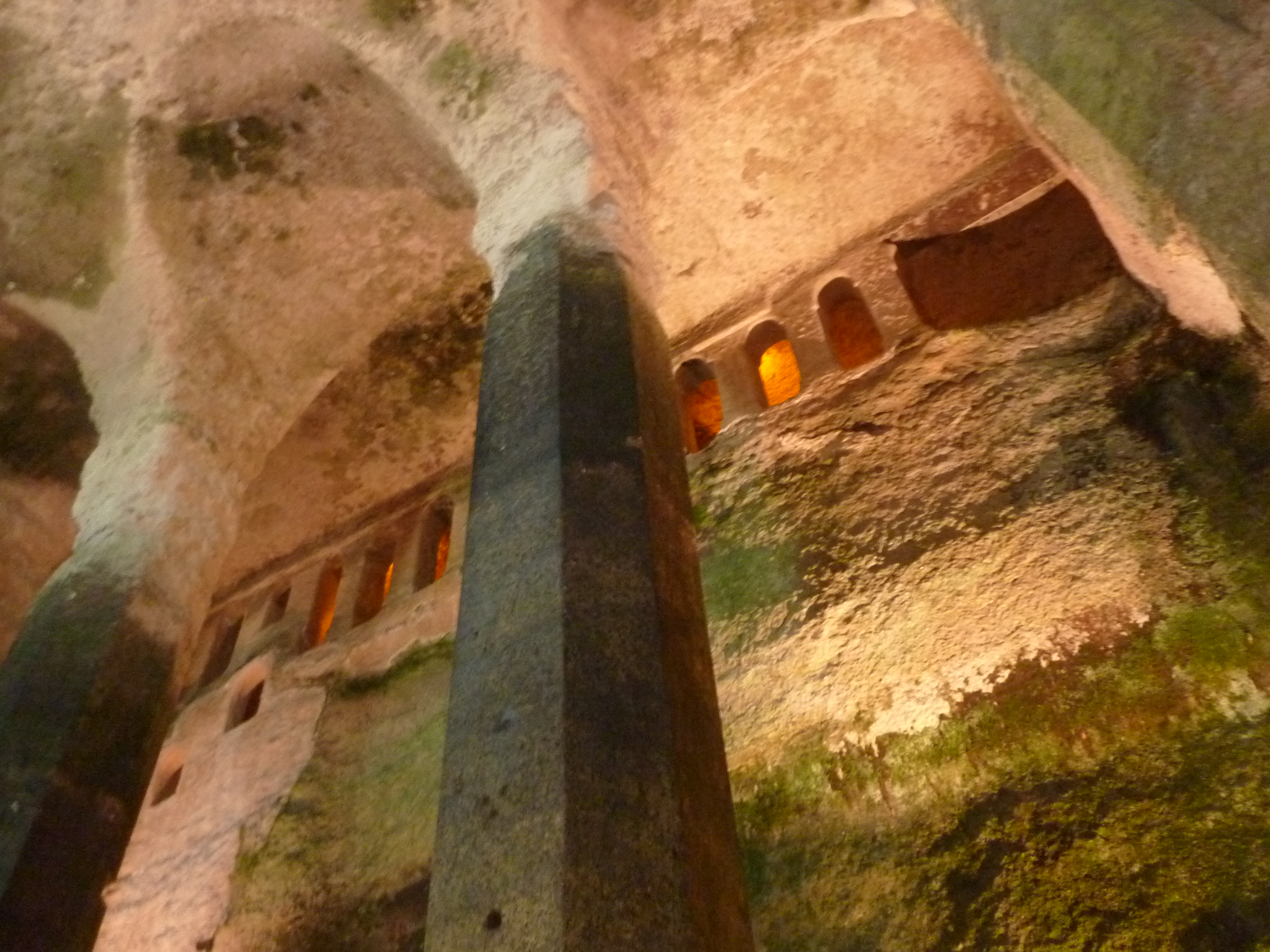
15 metre high galleries

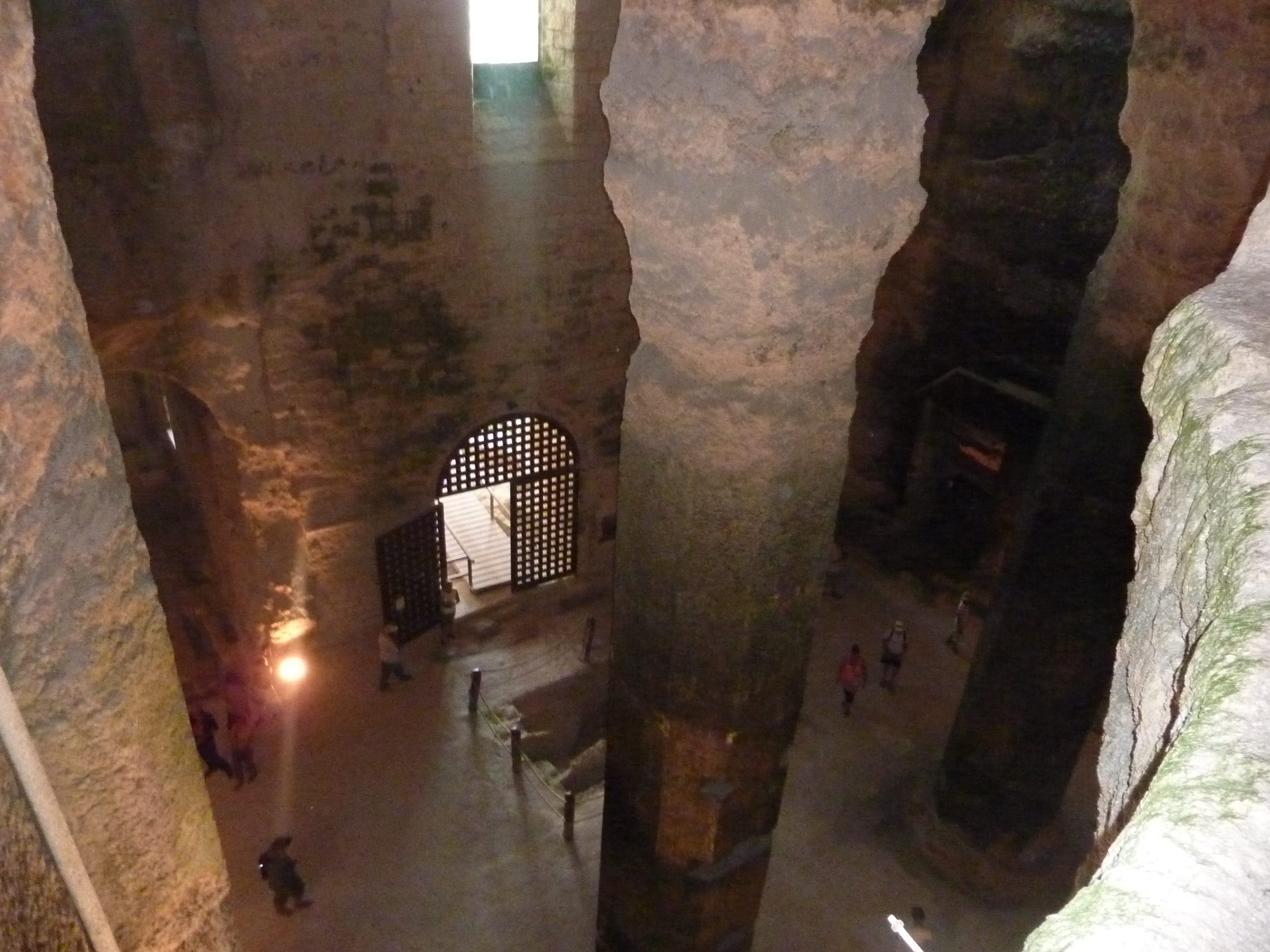
Looking down from the galleries

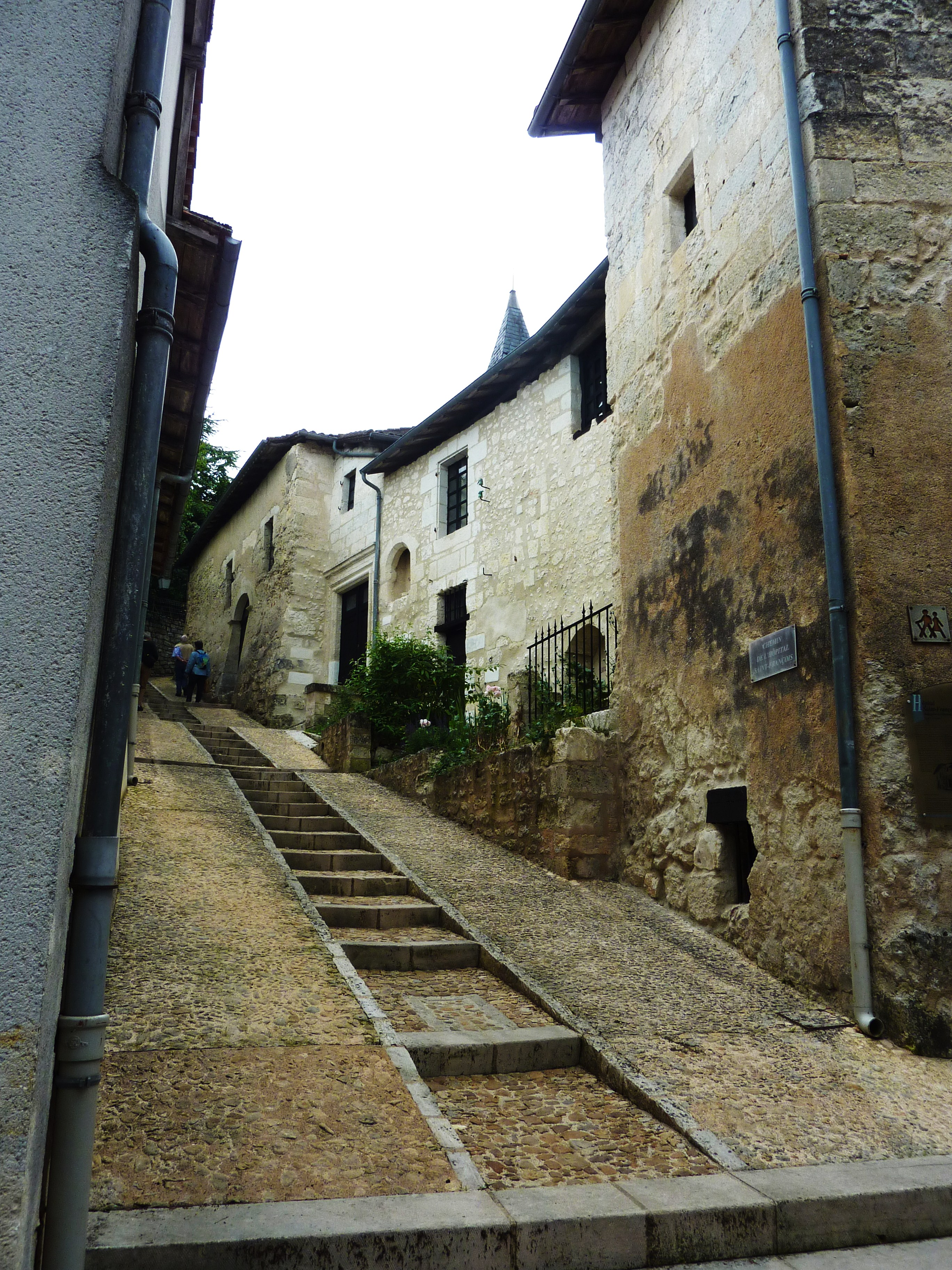
The old Saint Francis Hospice

- The Convent of the Poor Clares, founded in 1620, is now privately owned. It has a military aspect to its entrance with battlements and a parapet. This former Saint Francis Hospice, which dated from the 14th century, was originally built to help pilgrims, the sick, and the needy.

== Education ==
The school is an intercommunal educational grouping between Aubeterre, Bonnes, and Laprade. Aubeterre hosts the primary school while Bonnes and Laprade have elementary schools.

== Notable people linked to the commune ==
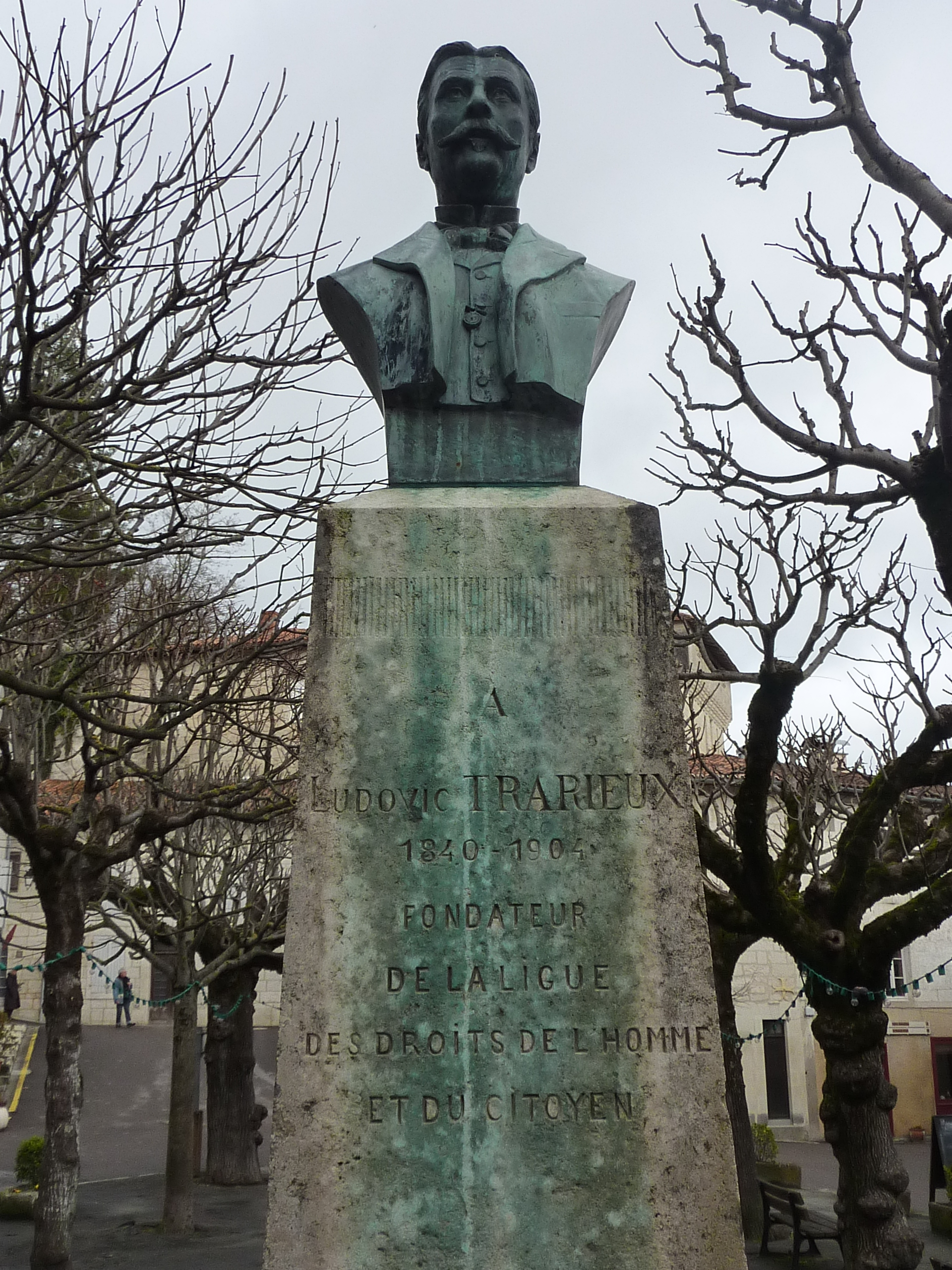
Statue of Ludovic Trarieux

- François d'Esparbès-Lussan (around 1571–1628), Viscount of Aubeterre, Marshal of France
- Henri Joseph Bouchard d'Esparbès de Lussan (24 January 1714 – 28 August 1788), Marquis of Aubeterre, Marshal of France
- Ludovic Trarieux, founder of the Ligue française pour la défense des droits de l'homme et du citoyen
- Pierre Véry, born in Bellon on 17 November 1900 and died in Paris on 12 October 1960, was a French writer and screenwriter, author of among others: Disparus de Saint-Agil. A small museum was opened on 21 June 2008 in his second home in Aubeterre on the instigation of his son Noël Véry, himself a famous cinematographic operator and promoter in France of the Steadycam process.
- Paulette Merval, born Paulette Riffaud (an old family in Aubeterre) on 3 November 1920 at La Roche-Chalais and died on 21 June 2009 at Bordeaux, and Marcel Merkès born on 7 July 1920 at Bordeaux and died on 30 March 2007 at Pessac. They were the "golden couple" of operetta, marrying 10,500 times in their scene. They owned the Baisevigne Domain where they liked to come and rest between performances at the Théâtre Mogador in Paris.

== See also ==
- Communes of the Charente department

=== Bibliography ===
- Pierre-Rémy Houssin with Jean Combes and Michel Luc, Charente from prehistory to our times, (collective work), St-Jean-d'Y, Imprimerie Bordessoules, coll. "History by documents", 1986, 429 p. (ISBN 2-903504-21-0, BnF No. FRBNF34901024 (in French)
