= Saint-Romain, Charente =

Saint-Romain
- Commune
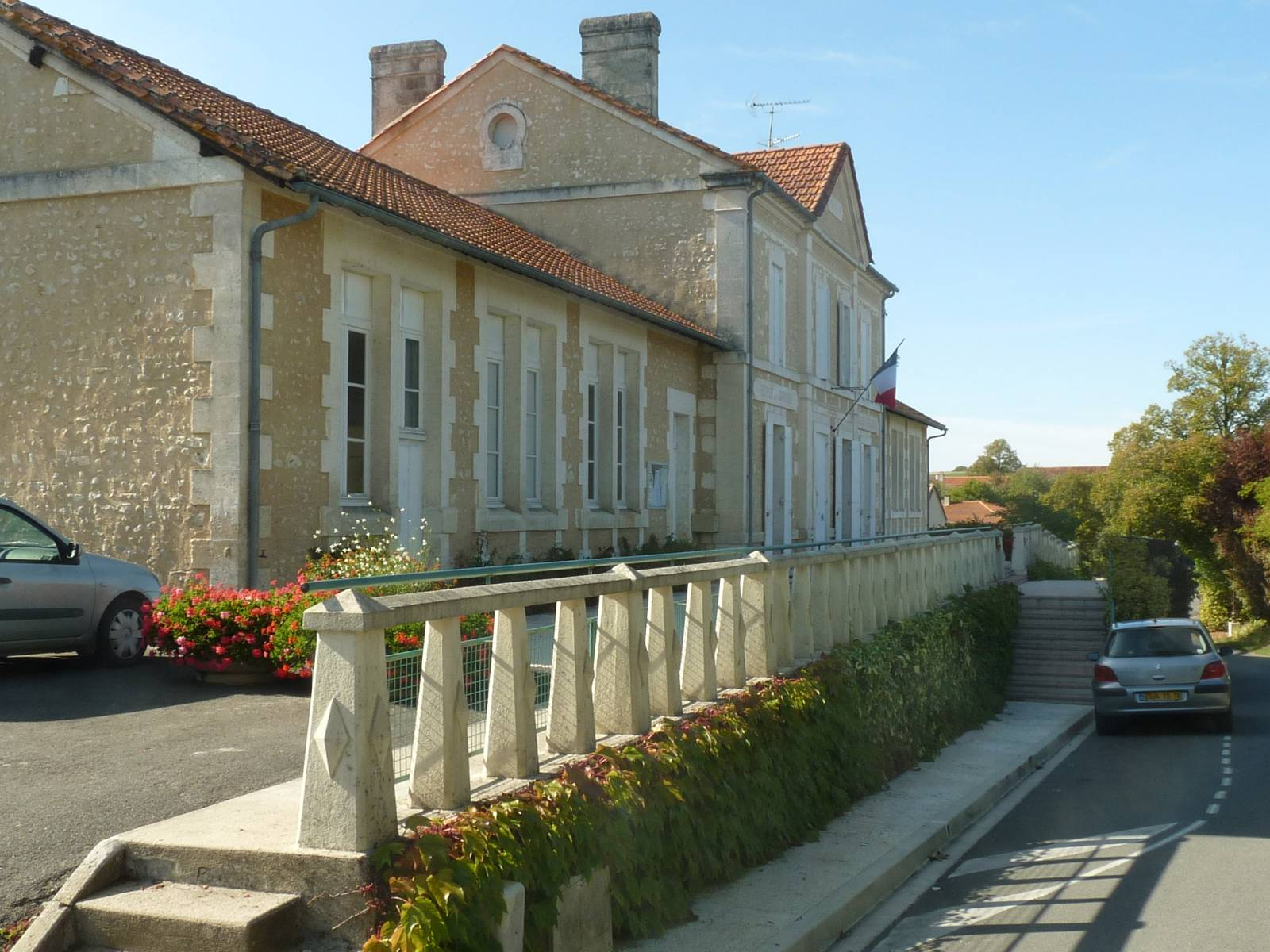
- Former Town hall
- Location of Saint-Romain
- Location within France Location within Nouvelle-Aquitaine
- Coordinates: 45°16′37″N 0°08′56″E
- Country: France
- Region: Nouvelle-Aquitaine
- Department: Charente
- Arrondissement: Angoulême
- Canton: Tude-et-Lavalette

Government
  - Mayor (2020–2026): Gilles Dupuy
- Area^{1}: 22.69 km^{2} (8.76 sq mi)
- Highest elevation: 168 m (551 ft)
- Lowest elevation: 54 m (177 ft)
- Population (2023): 514
  - Density: 22.7/km^{2} (58.7/sq mi)
- Time zone: UTC+01:00 (CET)
  - Summer (DST): UTC+02:00 (CEST)
- INSEE/Postal code: 16347 /16210
- ^{1} French Land Register data, which excludes lakes, ponds, glaciers > 1 km^{2} (0.386 sq mi or 247 acres) and river estuaries.

Saint-Romain (French pronunciation: [sɛ̃ ʁɔmɛ̃]) is a commune in the Charente department in southwestern France.

== Geography ==
The commune is located in the south of the department, 1 km west of Aubeterre-sur-Dronne, 9 km north of Saint-Aulaye, 19 km west of Ribérac, 18 km south of Montmoreau and 48 km south of Angoulême.

In terms on surface area, Saint-Romain is the largest commune of its canton, spreading up to 200m of Aubeterre town center. The commune sits on a low Cretaceous limestone plateau.

No rivers traverse Saint-Romain, but two small tributaries have their sources there: the Beauronne which flows south-west into the Dronne river and a tributary of the Tude in the north, as well as the Écrevansou, a small spring that follows the commune's eastern limits.

== Population ==
Historical population
Year	Pop.	±% p.a.
1968	506	—
1975	506	+0.00%
1982	460	−1.35%
1990	437	−0.64%
1999	512	+1.78%
2007	538	+0.62%
2012	553	+0.55%
2017	529	−0.88%
2023	514	−0.48%
Source: INSEE

The population is dispersed and the town has numerous hamlets and farms.

== History ==
The oldest parish registers date back to 1660.

According to a 1747 inventory, another church existed in the commune, in the Villedieu hamlet. There was no trace of it by 1910.

In 1789, on the eve of the French Revolution, Saint-Romain, like many parishes, issued a list of grievances.

== See also ==
- Communes of the Charente department
