= Ludovic Trarieux =

French Republican statesman (1840–1904)

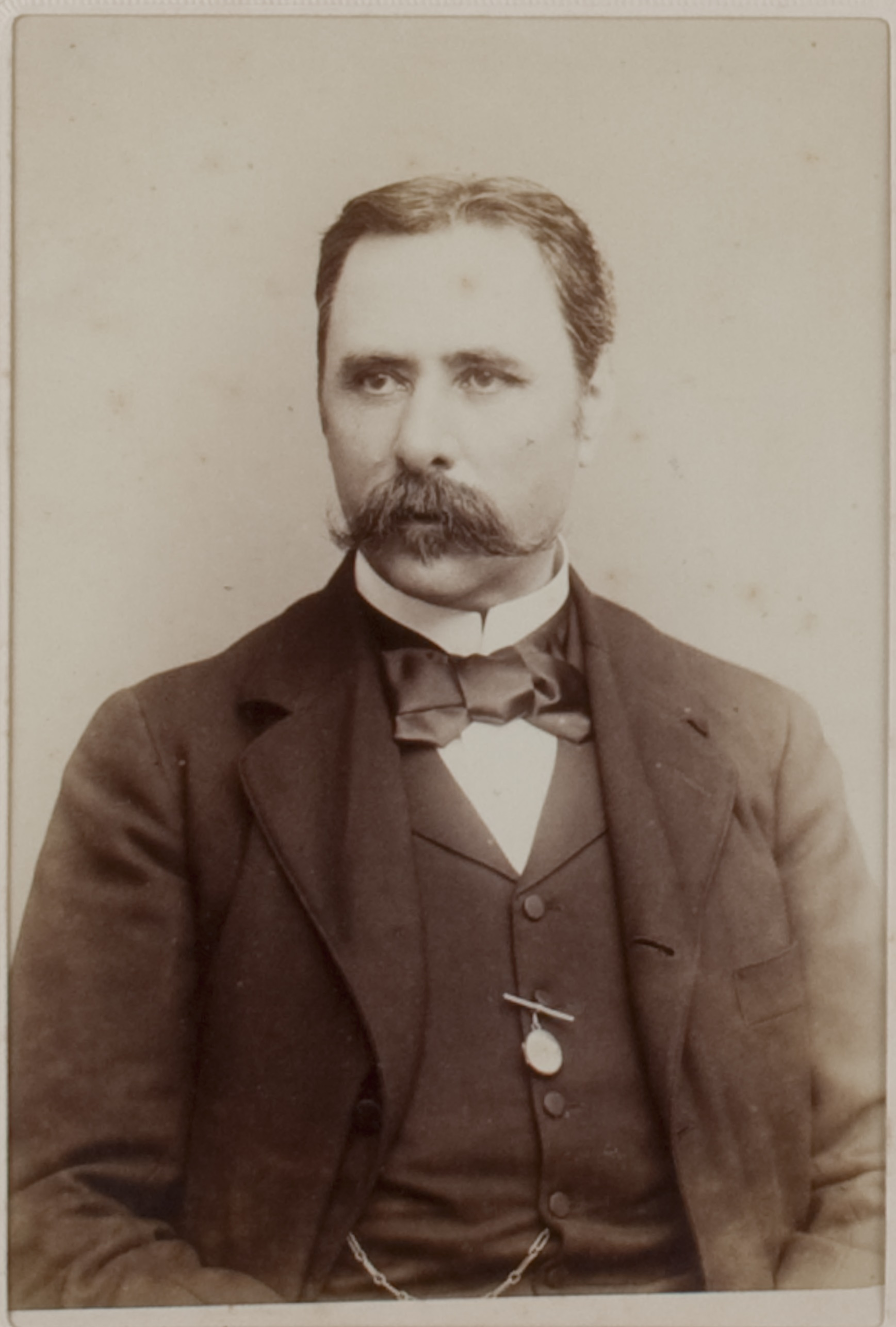
Ludovic Trarieux in 1894

Jacques Ludovic Trarieux (30 November 1840 in Aubeterre-sur-Dronne, Charente – 13 March 1904) was a French Republican statesman, lawyer, prominent Dreyfusard, and pioneer of international human rights.

== Early life ==
Ludovic Trarieux was born on 30 November 1840 in Aubeterre-sur-Dronne (Charente). He was called to the Bar of Bordeaux in 1862 and practiced there until 1881. He was elected President of the Bar in 1877, at the age of thirty-seven and became a member of the local republican party.

== Political life ==
On 6 April 1879 he was elected to the Chamber of Deputies and became a member of the Opportunist Republican parliamentary group, Gauche républicaine, where he was quickly noticed, making numerous interventions in debates. Nevertheless, his stay in power was short-lived. He approved the bill on the liberty of higher education, while supporting various amendments. He also voted for the invalidation of the election of Auguste Blanqui and against the plenary amnesty on cases concerning the Paris Commune. In the debate on the status of professional trade unions (that was finally voted in 1884), he intervened to seek guarantees.

Beaten in the new elections in 1881, he was called to the Parisian bar and pursued his political career there.

He was elected Senator of the Gironde on 5 January 1888, then re-elected in 1897, remaining in the post until his death. As a member of the Republican Left and soon President of the group of the Moderate Left (the most moderate in the High Assembly), at first he adopted some very conservative positions in cases on social laws (modification of article 1780 concerning service contracts, arbitration between employers and employees, the work of women and juveniles) and, in his report, rejected the bill of modification of the law on professional trade unions.

He distinguished himself, especially in 1893 and 1894, as the reporter on the voting of three of the four laws aimed at the repression of anarchist attacks (the famous "lois scélérates"). However, he fought energetically against an amendment that aimed to transfer infringements concerning the detention of explosives to the War Council, which had become more repressive, since it had refused to allow the removal of common law jurisdiction from these courts. In the same vein, on 28 May 1897, he pushed for the voting of the law that put an end to secret investigations in the absence of a lawyer, and fought for the institution of a system of competing experts in criminal matters, comparable to the adversarial system. In 1889, he was chosen by his peers of the Senate to become a member of the Commission of the Nine, in charge of the instruction of the lawsuit against General Boulanger.

== The Dreyfus affair ==
On 26 January 1895 he became Minister of Justice. He adopted a law that allowed more extensive opportunities of appeal in criminal cases, better compensation for injury suffered by victims of miscarriages of justice, and came up against a "legal event" that had just rocked France: one cold day, twenty-one days earlier, Captain Alfred Dreyfus had been convicted of treason, dishonourably discharged and, since 18 January, had been waiting on the Île de Ré to be transported to Devil's Island in French Guiana.

However, since his conviction in 1894, Dreyfus and his family had not stopped protesting his innocence. His conviction had been pronounced in camera, with the help of false secret documents which had not been communicated to the defence. Very few people at this time were convinced of Dreyfus's innocence. The case was closed and the Dreyfus affair had not yet begun.

While Minister of Justice, Trarieux obtained copies of Dreyfus's writing and discovered discrepancies between the convict's handwriting and that of the author of the document that had established his guilt. Besides, one of Dreyfus's lawyers, M. Demange, had come to reveal to him that a secret document had been communicated to the War Council unknown to the defence. After his departure from the Chancery, (10 November 1895), Trarieux sacrificed his professional and his political career to becoming the untiring defender of the innocence of Captain Dreyfus. On 7 December 1897 Trarieux was the only Senator to support Dreyfus's defender Auguste Scheurer-Kestner and praise his civic courage.

When evidence pointed to Ferdinand Walsin Esterhazy as the real guilty party, Esterhazy himself asked to be tried by a military court. Just before Esterhazy's trial on 8 January 1898, Trarieux published an open letter in "Le Temps", addressed to the War Minister, Billot, to denounce "the parody of justice". Esterhazy was acquitted.

In the trial of Émile Zola following his accusations against the army, Trarieux was an essential witness for the defence. He recounted evidence that he had collected, revealing what he had discovered concerning essential documents and explaining how he had become convinced that Esterhazy was guilty. As a former Minister of Justice, his support was much appreciated by Dreyfus's supporters.

Trarieux was a witness in Dreyfus's second trial in Rennes, from 7 August to 9 September 1899. Though reducing the sentence, the War Council in Rennes convicted Dreyfus a second time. Trarieux remarked, "Our defeat is of the kind that does not discourage, but foster courages and give grandeur to certain situations". He then challenged the Senate to pardon Dreyfus, in the name of justice, though initially this was only granted on the nominal grounds of the convict's ill health. This was pronounced by President Emile Loubet, in September 1899. A full amnesty followed in June 1900, granted by the Waldeck-Rousseau government, in order to calm the situation down.

== League of Human Rights ==
Between two hearings of the Zola case, on 17 or 18 February, at the tenth or eleventh hearing, Trarieux thought about creating the Ligue des droits de l'homme (LDH, "Human Rights League")

On 20 February 1898 a first meeting took place in his home, at 4 Logelbach Street. After several months of tireless activity, having united the support of a thousand people, Trarieux and his friends convened a general assembly, in the hall of the "Sociétés Savantes", in Paris.

It was there that, on 4 June 1898, was finally formed the Ligue des droits de l'homme (LDH, "Human Rights League"), of which Trarieux was proclaimed President and entrusted with the drawing up of its statutes. On 4 July 1898 the first manifesto of the League of Human Rights proclaimed: "from this day, anyone whose liberty is threatened or whose rights are violated can be ensured of obtaining help and assistance from us".

On 20 August 1898, after the humiliating arrest of Dreyfus supporter Colonel Georges Picquart, found "guilty – of having denounced the Henry forgery", on the orders of Jacques Cavaignac, the War Minister, Trarieux wrote another open letter to Cavaignac, and distributed 400 000 copies of it all over France. Cavaignac had to resign on 5 September 1898 and nearly one year day-for-day after the constitution of the League of Human Rights, on 3 June 1899, the Supreme Court quashed the Dreyfus judgment of 1894 and referred the case to the War Council in Rennes.

He continued to develop the Ligue des droits de l'homme (LDH, "Human Rights League"), that soon had several tens of thousands of members.

== Final years ==
Exhausted by his efforts and by ill health, in 1903, he was forced to hand over the presidency of the League of Human Rights to his friend, Francis de Pressensé. Until his death, he dedicated his last efforts to Dreyfus's rehabilitation, (which he did not live to see, since it took place on 12 July 1906) and to the defence of human rights.

He died on 13 March 1904 in his Parisian apartment at 4 Rue de Logelbach.

== The "Ludovic-Trarieux International Human Rights Prize" ==
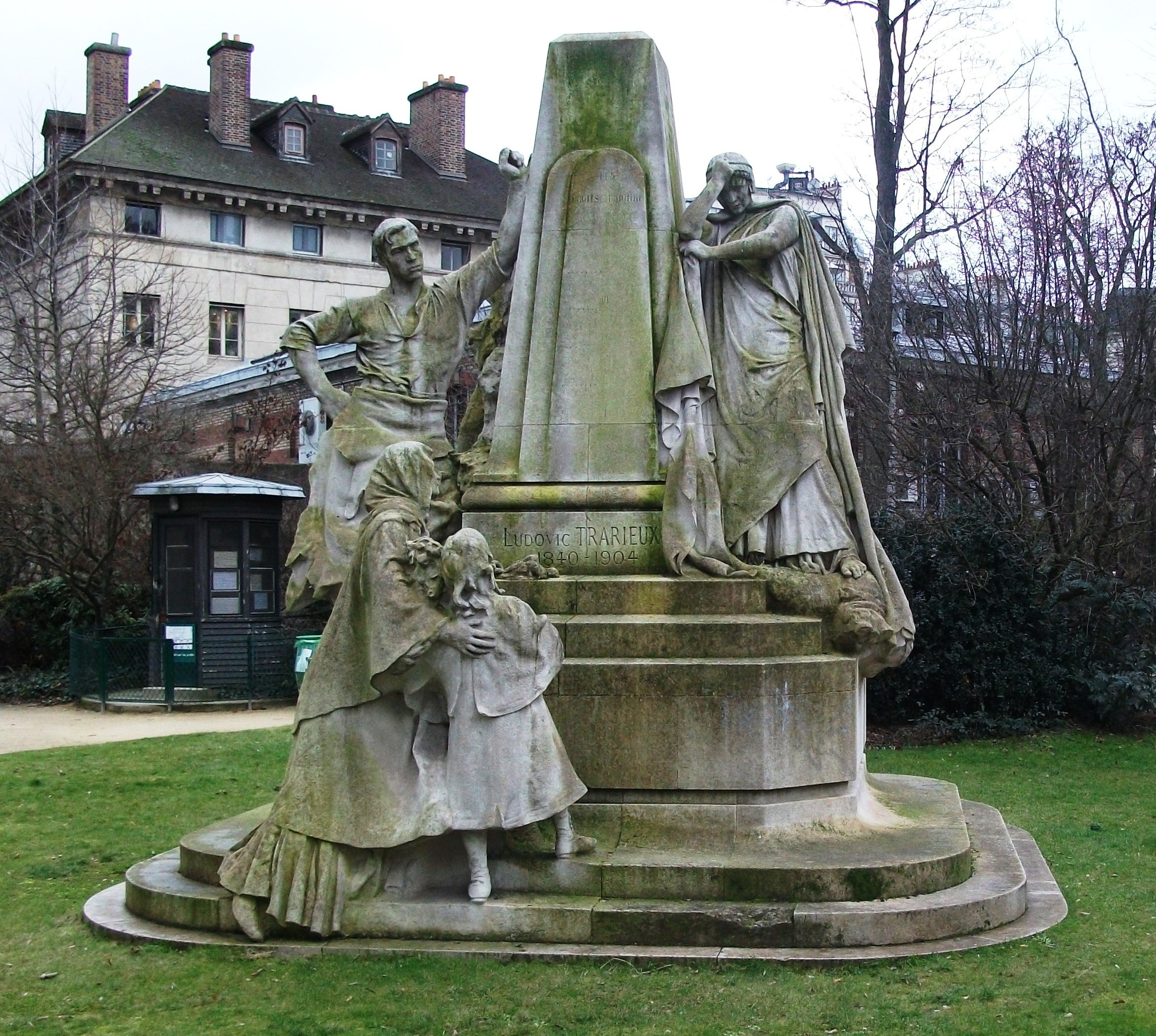
Monument to Ludovic Trarieux in Place Claude Nicolás-Ledoux, designed by Jean Boucher

Created in 1984, in Bordeaux by the French lawyer Bertrand Favreau, "The Ludovic-Trarieux International Human Rights Prize" is awarded each year to a lawyer, regardless of nationality or Bar, who, by his work, has demonstrated through his work or experiences, the defence of human rights, of defence rights, the supremacy of law, the struggle against racism and intolerance in any form. The prize-winner is chosen after consulting humanitarian associations and NGOs.

The Prize, also called "The international tribute from Lawyers to a Lawyer", is presented in partnership by the Human Rights Institute of The Bar of Bordeaux, the Human Rights Institute of the Bar of Paris, the Human Rights Institute of The Bar of Brussels, l'Unione forense per la tutela dei diritti dell'uomo (Roma) and the European Bar Human Rights Institute (IDHAE) whose members are the biggest European law societies fighting for human rights such as Union Internationale des Avocats (UIA), Rechtsanwaltskammer Berlin, Ordre français des Avocats du barreau de Bruxelles, barreau de Luxembourg or Polish National Council of the Bar (Warsaw).

The first Ludovic Trarieux Prize was awarded on 29 March 1985 to Nelson Mandela, then in jail. It was officially handed over to his daughter, Zenani Mandela-Dlamini, on 27 April 1985. His body is interred at the Protestant cemetery in Bordeaux.
