= Jean-Pierre Escalettes =

French footballer (1935–2026)

President of the French Football Federation
- In office 12 February 2005 – 2 July 2010
- Preceded by: Claude Simonet
- Succeeded by: Fernand Duchaussoy

Personal details
- Born: Jean Pierre Edmond Escalettes; 29 May 1935 Béziers, France
- Died: 14 April 2026 (aged 90)
- Citizenship: France
- Education: University of Bordeaux
Association football career
- Position: Midfielder
Senior career*
Years	Team	Apps	(Gls)
1952–1959	Bordeaux Students Club		
- AC Ribérac
- * Club domestic league appearances and goals

Jean Pierre Edmond Escalettes (29 May 1935 – 14 April 2026), known as Jean-Pierre Escalettes, was a French footballer and administrator who was the president of the French Football Federation having served in the role from 12 February 2005 to 2 July 2010. He was awarded the presidency after winning the ball with 92.56% of the vote. On 28 June 2010, Escalettes announced his resignation from his position effective 2 July.

== Career ==
Escalettes was a football player, having played university football at the University of Bordeaux and for AC Ribérac at amateur level. He later had a two-year stint at the University of Bristol where he studied English. Escalettes taught the language, as a professor, at a local university in Ribérac. While teaching, he also served as the secretary general, player, and coach of local club AC Ribérac. Escalettes rose through the ranks of the country's footballing hierarchy first serving as district president of Dordogne. In 1981, he moved up to the regional level after being appointed the president and general secretary of the Ligue d'Aquitaine. In 1985, Escalettes joined the French Football Federation becoming a member of the organization's Federal Council. Five years later, he was appointed the Secretary General. In 1995, he was named as the president of the newly created Conseil National du Football Amateur (National Council of Amateur Football). In 2000, the council changed its name to Ligue Fédérale du Football Amateur (Federal League of Amateur Football). Escalettes served as president until 8 January 2005. A month later, he was named president of the French Football Federation replacing Claude Simonet.

Under Escalettes reign as president, the senior national team reached the 2006 FIFA World Cup final losing to Italy. The team also reached UEFA Euro 2008. On 22 February 2008, the French Football Federation announced that they were ending their partnership with Adidas and signing with the American manufacturer Nike, effective 1 January 2011. The unprecedented deal is valued at €320 million over seven years (2011–2018) making France's blue shirt the most expensive ever in the history of football. Escalettes stated when discussing the deal: "It's the financial aspect that made the difference. I had neither the moral nor legal capacity to take any other decision." On 17 April 2007, Esclattes confirmed France's intention to bid for the hosting rights of UEFA Euro 2016. Three years later, on 28 May 2010, France were granted hosting rights by UEFA for the competition.

During Escalettes presidency, he was a known supporter of former national team coach Raymond Domenech and openly backed him to return to the team after the Euro 2008 debacle, however, not without declaring that radical changes would and should be made to the team. On 28 June 2010, following the debacle at the 2010 FIFA World Cup, in which the French players went on strike to protest the exclusion of Nicolas Anelka from the team, Escalettes announced his resignation from his position effective 2 July. On 22 March 2011, he was awarded the UEFA Order of Merit by association president Michel Platini for his contributions to the sport.

== Death ==
Escalettes died on 14 April 2026, at the age of 90.

== Honours ==
- Knight of the Legion of Honour: 1998
