= Henri Joseph Bouchard d'Esparbès de Lussan d'Aubeterre =

French general and marshal

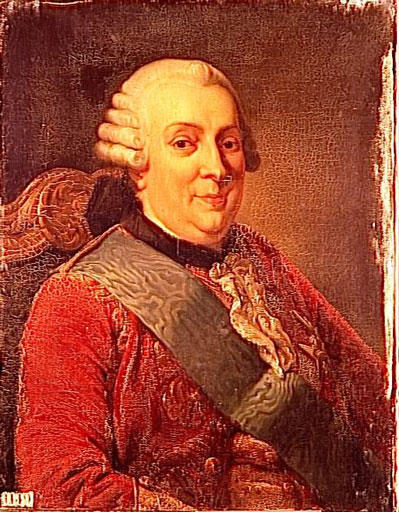
Henri Joseph Bouchard d'Esparbès de Lussan d'Aubeterre

Henri Joseph Bouchard d'Esparbès de Lussan (24 January 1714 - 28 August 1788), marquis d'Aubeterre, baron de Saint-Quentin, was a French general and marshal.
