= Bonnes, Charente =

Bonnes
- Commune
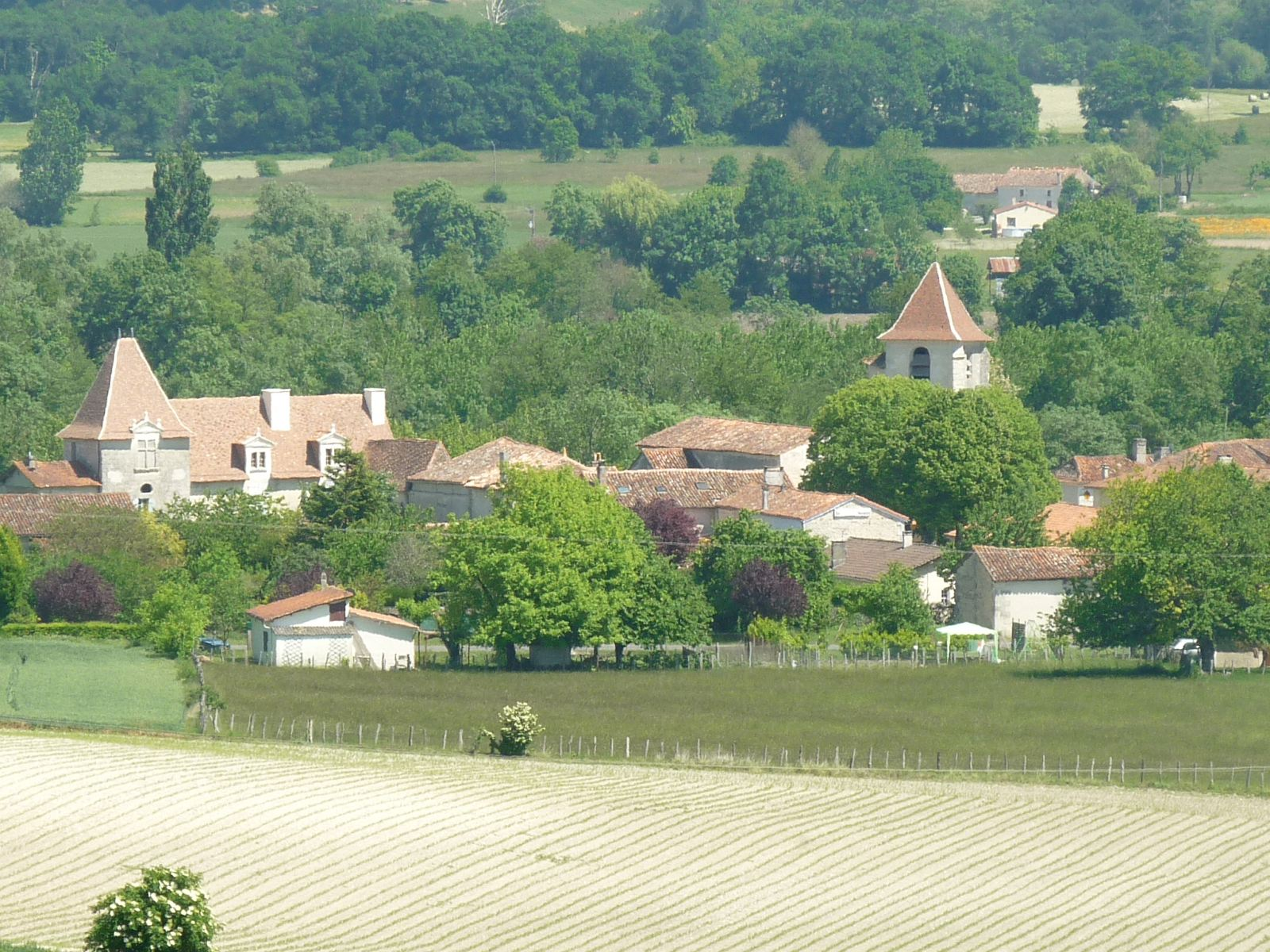
- A general view of Bonnes

- Coat of arms
- Location of Bonnes
- Location within France Location within Nouvelle-Aquitaine
- Coordinates: 45°14′28″N 0°09′02″E
- Country: France
- Region: Nouvelle-Aquitaine
- Department: Charente
- Arrondissement: Angoulême
- Canton: Tude-et-Lavalette

Government
  - Mayor (2020–2026): Stéphane Béguerie
- Area^{1}: 14.76 km^{2} (5.70 sq mi)
- Elevation: 30 m (98 ft)
- Highest elevation: 136 m (446 ft)
- Lowest elevation: 32 m (105 ft)
- Population (2023): 364
  - Density: 24.7/km^{2} (63.9/sq mi)
- Time zone: UTC+01:00 (CET)
  - Summer (DST): UTC+02:00 (CEST)
- INSEE/Postal code: 16049 /16390
- ^{1} French Land Register data, which excludes lakes, ponds, glaciers > 1 km^{2} (0.386 sq mi or 247 acres) and river estuaries.

Bonnes (French pronunciation: [bɔn]; Occitan: Bona) is a commune in the Charente department in southwestern France, close to the border with the Dordogne department. It is located about 50 km west of Périgueux on the river Dronne.

== Population ==
Historical population
Year	Pop.	±% p.a.
1968	448	—
1975	449	+0.03%
1982	362	−3.03%
1990	341	−0.74%
1999	333	−0.26%
2007	352	+0.70%
2012	395	+2.33%
2017	406	+0.55%
2023	364	−1.80%
Source: INSEE

== See also ==
- Communes of the Charente department
