= Saint-Martin-de-Ribérac =

- Commune
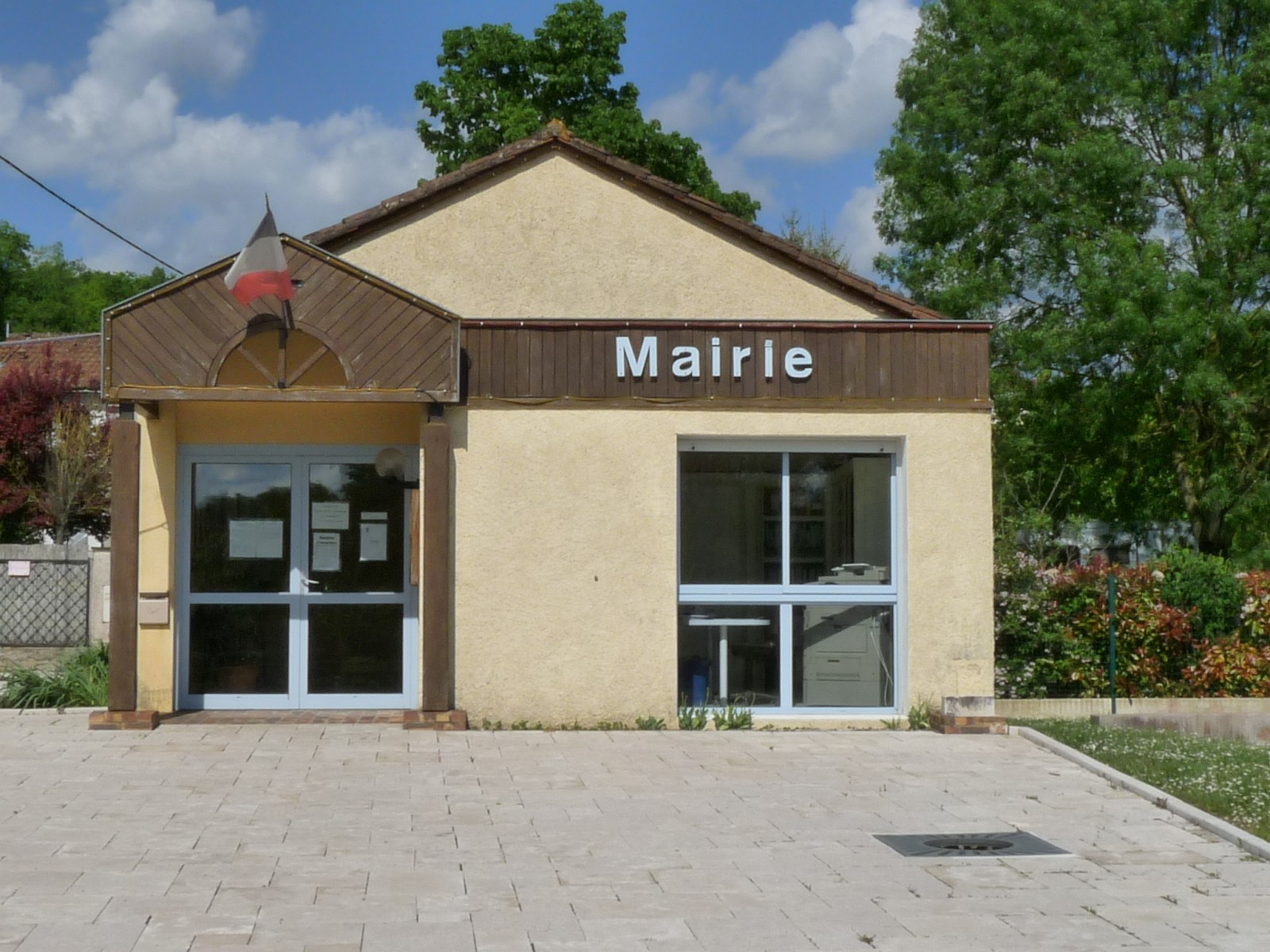
- The town hall in Saint-Martin-de-Ribérac
- Location of Saint-Martin-de-Ribérac
- Location within France Location within Nouvelle-Aquitaine
- Coordinates: 45°13′50″N 0°21′33″E
- Country: France
- Region: Nouvelle-Aquitaine
- Department: Dordogne
- Arrondissement: Périgueux
- Canton: Ribérac
- Intercommunality: Périgord Ribéracois

Government
  - Mayor (2020–2026): Jean-Pierre Paretour
- Area^{1}: 16.38 km^{2} (6.32 sq mi)
- Elevation: 125 m (410 ft)
- Highest elevation: 197 m (646 ft)
- Lowest elevation: 74 m (243 ft)
- Population (2023): 723
  - Density: 44.1/km^{2} (114/sq mi)
- Time zone: UTC+01:00 (CET)
  - Summer (DST): UTC+02:00 (CEST)
- INSEE/Postal code: 24455 /24600
- ^{1} French Land Register data, which excludes lakes, ponds, glaciers > 1 km^{2} (0.386 sq mi or 247 acres) and river estuaries.

Saint-Martin-de-Ribérac (French pronunciation: [sɛ̃ maʁtɛ̃ də ʁibeʁak], literally Saint-Martin of Ribérac; Limousin: Sent Martin de Rabairac) is a commune in the Dordogne department in Nouvelle-Aquitaine in southwestern France.

== Population ==
Historical population
Year	Pop.	±% p.a.
1968	647	—
1975	611	−0.81%
1982	594	−0.40%
1990	607	+0.27%
1999	654	+0.83%
2007	678	+0.45%
2012	713	+1.01%
2017	716	+0.08%
2023	723	+0.16%
Source: INSEE

== History ==
The commune of Saint-Martin-de-Ribérac was created in 1851, when it was separated from the commune of Ribérac.

== See also ==
- Communes of the Dordogne department
