= Laprade, Charente =

Laprade
- Commune
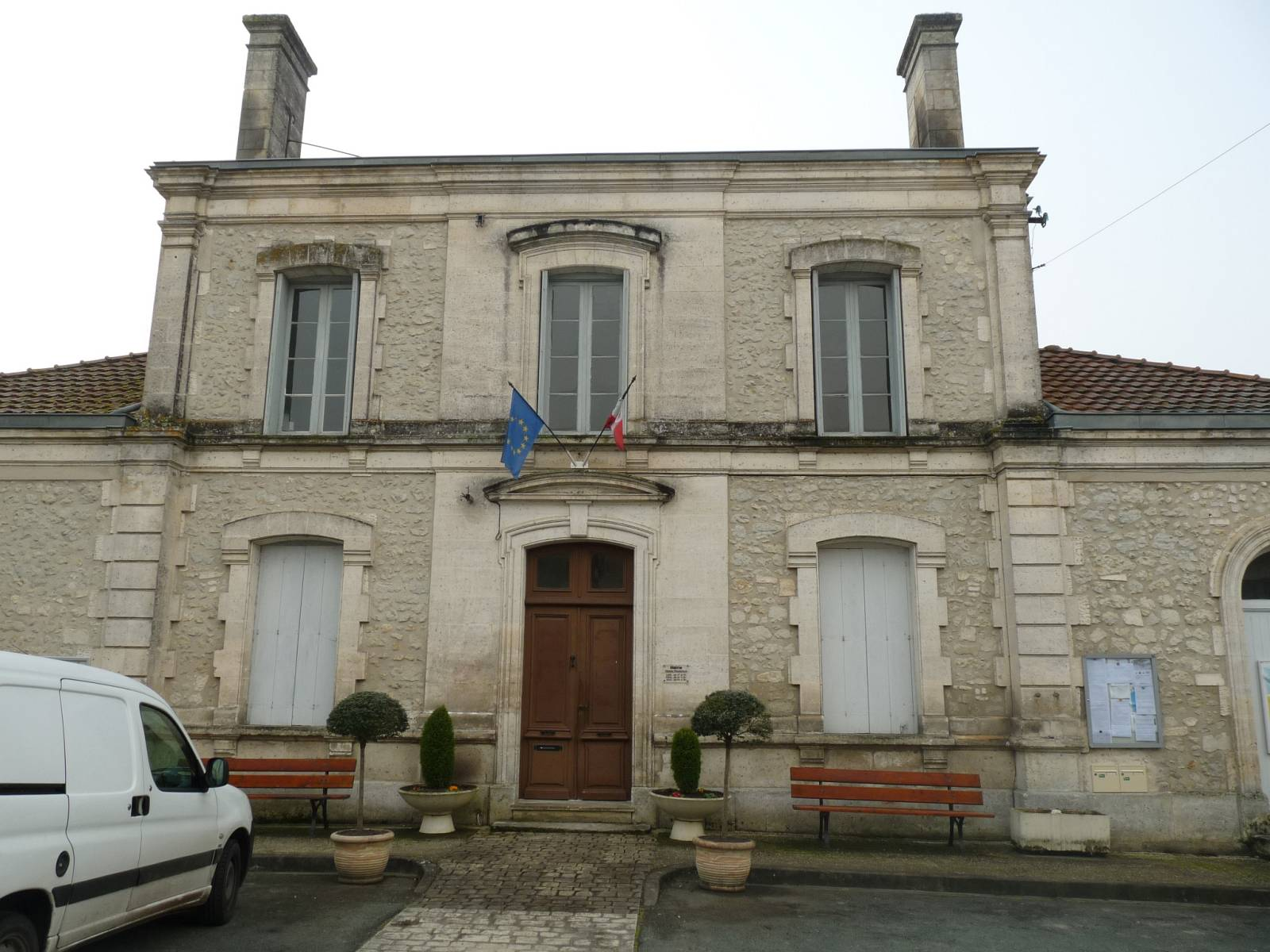
- Town hall
- Location of Laprade
- Location within France Location within Nouvelle-Aquitaine
- Coordinates: 45°16′43″N 0°11′07″E
- Country: France
- Region: Nouvelle-Aquitaine
- Department: Charente
- Arrondissement: Angoulême
- Canton: Tude-et-Lavalette

Government
  - Mayor (2020–2026): Jean-Paul Crochet
- Area^{1}: 10.17 km^{2} (3.93 sq mi)
- Elevation: 34 m (112 ft)
- Highest elevation: 132 m (433 ft)
- Lowest elevation: 40 m (130 ft)
- Population (2023): 248
  - Density: 24.4/km^{2} (63.2/sq mi)
- Time zone: UTC+01:00 (CET)
  - Summer (DST): UTC+02:00 (CEST)
- INSEE/Postal code: 16180 /16390
- ^{1} French Land Register data, which excludes lakes, ponds, glaciers > 1 km^{2} (0.386 sq mi or 247 acres) and river estuaries.

Laprade (French pronunciation: [lapʁad]; Occitan: La Prada) is a commune in the Charente department in southwestern France.

== Population ==
Historical population
Year	Pop.	±% p.a.
1968	316	—
1975	265	−2.48%
1982	223	−2.43%
1990	207	−0.93%
1999	209	+0.11%
2007	224	+0.87%
2012	234	+0.88%
2017	247	+1.09%
2023	248	+0.07%
Source: INSEE

== See also ==
- Communes of the Charente department
