= Ribérac =

- Commune
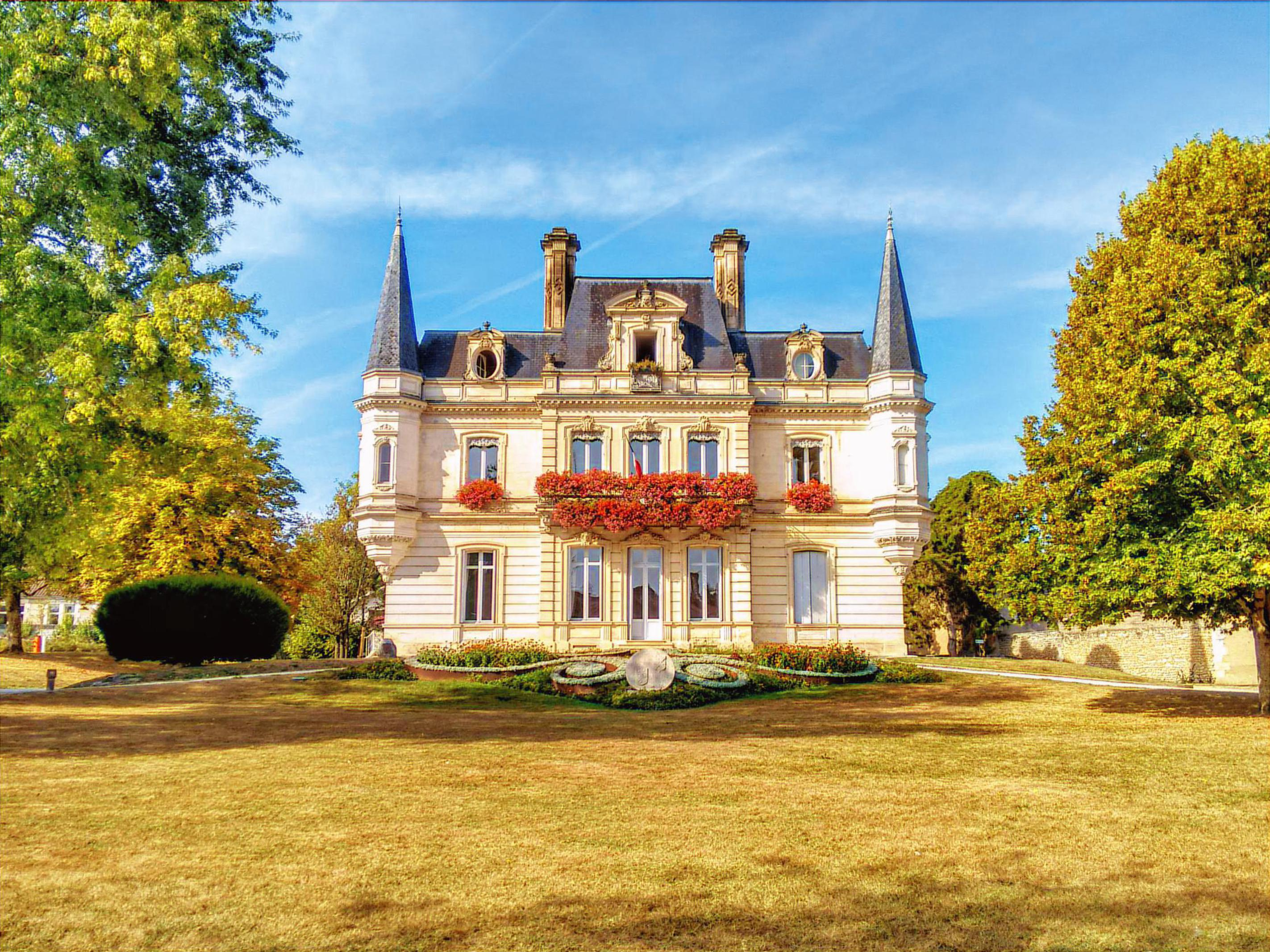
- Town hall

- Coat of arms
- Location of Ribérac
- Location within France Location within Nouvelle-Aquitaine
- Coordinates: 45°14′52″N 0°20′23″E
- Country: France
- Region: Nouvelle-Aquitaine
- Department: Dordogne
- Arrondissement: Périgueux
- Canton: Ribérac

Government
  - Mayor (2020–2026): Nicolas Platon
- Area^{1}: 22.79 km^{2} (8.80 sq mi)
- Elevation: 68 m (223 ft)
- Highest elevation: 155 m (509 ft)
- Lowest elevation: 54 m (177 ft)
- Population (2023): 3,734
  - Density: 163.8/km^{2} (424.4/sq mi)
- Time zone: UTC+01:00 (CET)
  - Summer (DST): UTC+02:00 (CEST)
- INSEE/Postal code: 24352 /24600
- ^{1} French Land Register data, which excludes lakes, ponds, glaciers > 1 km^{2} (0.386 sq mi or 247 acres) and river estuaries.

Ribérac (French pronunciation: [ʁibeʁak]; Occitan: Rabairac) is a commune in the Dordogne department in Nouvelle-Aquitaine in southwestern France. The commune is situated by the Dronne River.

== History ==
In response to the 848 Norman plunder of nearby Brantôme, a fort was built near a ford of the Dronne. Around the year 1000, the castle of Ribérac was built on a hill where the current cemetery is. Houses are set up at the foot of the walls, descending towards the valley. After the Wars of Religion, in the late 1500s, the castle was abanonded and was in ruins by the time of the French Revolution.

In 1790, Ribérac became the prefecture of the District of Ribérac (French: District de Ribérac). In 1793, the commune of La Faye joined with Ribérac. In 1800 Ribérac became one of the four sub-prefectures of the Dordogne. In 1851, part of the commune moved to the new commune of Saint-Martin-de-Ribérac. In 1926, the Arrondissement of Ribérac was disbanded, and Ribérac joined the Arrondissement of Périgueux.

Despite the efforts of local Maquis resistance fighters, the area was occupied by the German army in March 1944.

== Geography ==
Ribérac is on the left bank of the Dronne. To the north, the soil in the Dronne valley is covered with alluvium, while the heights are made up of Cretaceous limestones. Its minimum altitude, 54 metres, is located in the extreme north-west of the town, where a small arm of the Dronne leaves the town.

The climate is classified as “altered oceanic”, a transition zone between oceanic, mountain and semi-continental climates. With climate change, it is predicted that the average temperature will increase and the average rainfall decline.

== Local government ==
Ribérac is a commune, or municipality. The commune is part of the communauté de communes, (the French: fr:Communauté de communes du Périgord Ribéracois).

Since the 2020 municipal election, the municipal council has been led by the Union of the Left.

== Population ==
As of 2017, the number of people aged over 60 (42.1%) was higher than the national (25.5%) and departmental (35.9%) rates. The female population of the town is greater than the male population (55.3%), and higher than the departmental (51.8%) and national (51.6%) rates.

Historical population
Year	Pop.	±% p.a.
1968	3,787	—
1975	3,984	+0.73%
1982	3,832	−0.55%
1990	4,118	+0.90%
1999	4,000	−0.32%
2007	4,123	+0.38%
2012	4,015	−0.53%
2017	3,861	−0.78%
2023	3,734	−0.56%
Source: INSEE

== Notable residents ==
- Arnaut Daniel (1180–1200): Occitan troubadour
- Fernand Faure (1853–1929): economist and politician
- Oscar Bardi de Fourtou (1836-1897): politician
- Jean-Pierre Escalettes: (1935-2026) football player

== See also ==
- Communes of the Dordogne department
