= Dronne =

River in southwestern France

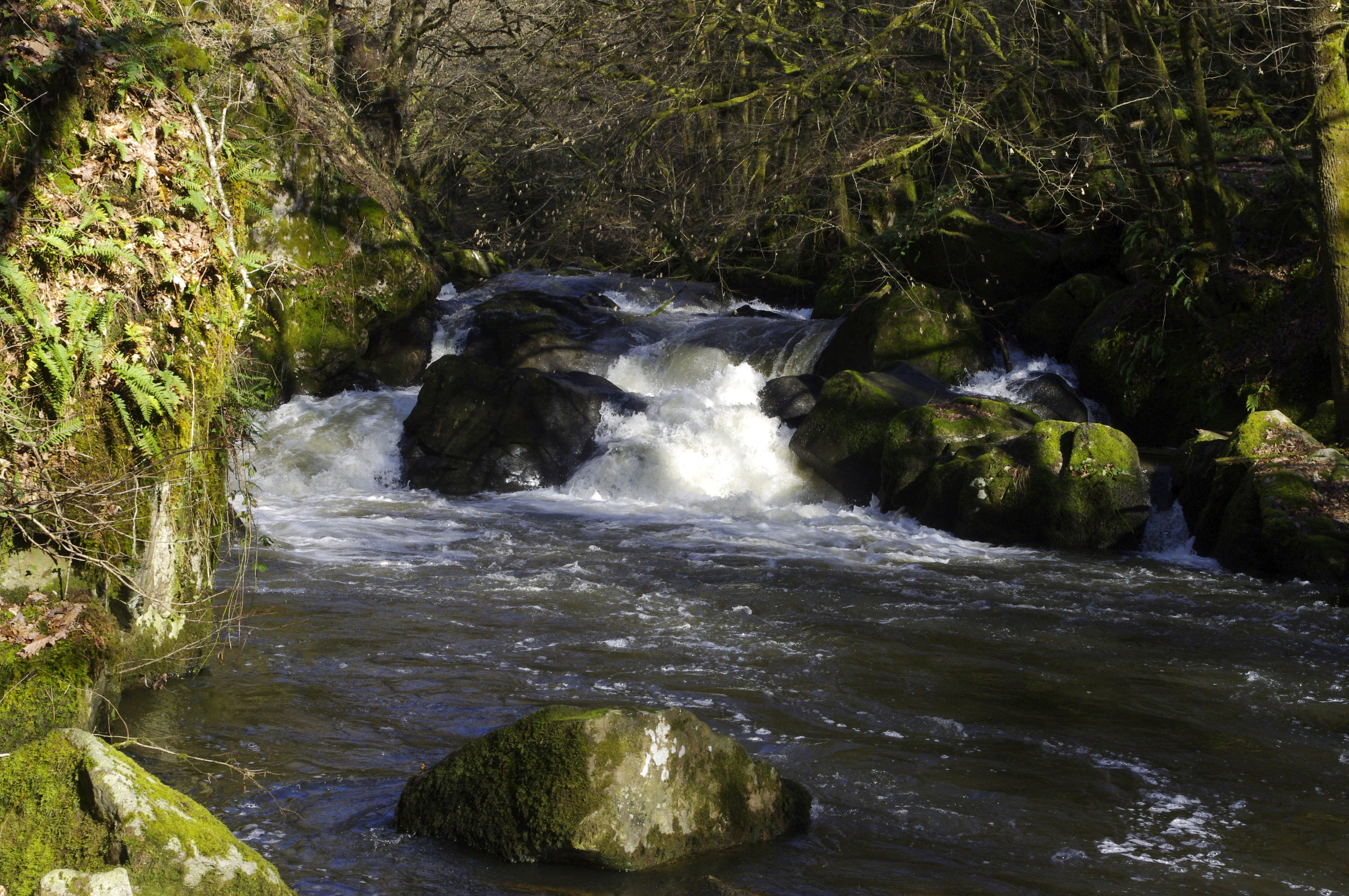
- The Dronne at the rapids near Champs-Romain

- Location within France Location within Nouvelle-Aquitaine

Location
- Country: France

Physical characteristics
- Source
  - location: Massif Central
  - elevation: 510 m (1,670 ft)
- Mouth
  - location: Isle
  - coordinates: 45°2′15″N 0°8′54″W
- Length: 201 km (125 mi)
- Discharge
  - average: 25.1 m^{3}/s (890 cu ft/s)

Basin features
- Progression: Isle→ Dordogne→ Gironde estuary→ Atlantic Ocean

The Dronne (French pronunciation: [dʁɔn], also Drône, [dʁon]; Occitan: Drona) is a 201-kilometre (125 mi) long river in southwestern France, right tributary of the Isle, which itself is a tributary of the Dordogne. The source of the Dronne is in the north-western Massif Central, east of the town of Châlus (south-west of Limoges) at an elevation of 510 metres (1,670 ft). It flows south-west through the following départements and towns:

- Haute-Vienne
- Dordogne: Saint-Pardoux-la-Rivière, Brantôme, Ribérac
- Charente: Aubeterre-sur-Dronne
- Charente-Maritime
- Gironde: Coutras

The Dronne flows into the Isle in Coutras.

Among its tributaries are the Lizonne and the Côle.
