= Canton of Montmoreau-Saint-Cybard =

Coordinates: 45°24′00″N 0°07′54″E

Montmoreau-Saint-Cybard
- Former canton
- Interactive map of Montmoreau-Saint-Cybard
- Country: France
- Region: Nouvelle-Aquitaine
- Department: Charente
- No. of communes: {{{nbcomm}}}
- Disbanded: 2015
- Area: 196 km^{2} (76 sq mi)
- Population (2012): 4,710
  - Density: 24.0/km^{2} (62.2/sq mi)

The canton of Montmoreau-Saint-Cybard is a former administrative division in the Charente department, France. It had 4,710 inhabitants (2012). It was disbanded following the French canton reorganisation which came into effect in March 2015. It consisted of 14 communes, which joined the canton of Tude-et-Lavalette in 2015.

The canton comprised the following communes:

- Aignes-et-Puypéroux
- Bors
- Courgeac
- Deviat
- Juignac
- Montmoreau-Saint-Cybard
- Nonac
- Palluaud
- Poullignac
- Saint-Amant
- Saint-Eutrope
- Saint-Laurent-de-Belzagot
- Saint-Martial
- Salles-Lavalette

== See also ==
- Cantons of the Charente department
