= Marguerite Rutan =

Blessed Marguerite Rutan D.R.
- Marguerite Rutan c1903.jpg

Religious
- Born: 23 April 1736; Metz, Moselle, Kingdom of France
- Died: 9 April 1794 (aged 57); Dax, Landes, French First Republic
- Venerated in: Roman Catholic Church
- Beatified: 19 June 2011, Les Arènes, Dax, Landes, France by Cardinal Angelo Amato
- Feast: 26 June
- Attributes: Religious habit
- Patronage: Nurses; Persecuted Christians; Prisoners

Marguerite Rutan (23 April 1736 – 9 April 1794) was a French Roman Catholic religious person who was a professed member of the Vincentian Sisters. Rutan served as the mother superior of a hospital the sisters managed until the time of the French Revolution when she was executed based on the allegations of fanaticism and anti-Revolution sentiment.

The process for beatification – the recognition that she died "in odium fidei" (in hatred of the faith) – commenced under Pope Benedict XV but was long and protracted; it seemed doomed after Rome suggested there was no local following (or "cultus") to Rutan. Later revival of the process allowed for Pope Benedict XVI to approve the beatification; Cardinal Angelo Amato – on the behalf of the pope – presided over the beatification on 19 June 2011.

== Life ==
Marguerite Rutan was born in Metz on 23 April 1736 as the eighth of fifteen children to Charles Gaspard and Marie Forat; she was baptized hours after her birth in the parish church of Saint-Étienne-le-Dépenné. Her father was a stonecutter while her mother was a devoted housewife and a pious Christian. Her mother provided her - as with all her children - a solid education based upon Christian values and the basic precepts of the faith.

Her father introduced her to mathematics and linear design to the point where she was able to keep the accounts of his business. At the age of 21 she had a profound conviction that Jesus Christ was calling her to the service of the poor.

On 23 April 1757 she entered the Vincentian Sisters at its Mother-House in Paris and entered the novitiate; she was thus a novice. She was sent on various assignments during her novitiate in the line of Saint Vincent de Paul's core precept: "Let us not be bound in any way, neither to places nor to tasks, not to people". Rutan travelled to Toulouse in September 1757 and around that time to Pau; April 1772 went to Fontainebleau; to Troyes in April 1779 and to Dax in August 1779.

The Bishop of Dax Louis-Marie de Suarez d'Aulan asked the sisters to take charge of a new hospital in Saint-Eutrope; Rutan arrived there in 1779 with a small group of seven religious and was appointed as its Mother Superior. She was hailed as a pioneer of social work in Dax and she opened schools as well as provide a shelter for girls. Her initiatives proved to be quite popular among the people of Dax who held Rutan in high regard. This was so despite the fact that the outbreak of the French Revolution saw much anti-religious sentiment and even persecution.

Around 1792 the C.P.S. aimed to discredit and remove Rutan as an opponent of the state who - it was alleged - harbored anti-Revolution sentiment and fanatic views. On 26 May 1792 the order's chaplain Lacoutre did not swear the oath of allegiance and was replaced with Larrabure who did swear it. On 3 June 1792 the sisters were accused of being thieves. The nuns of the congregation refused to take the oath on 3 October 1793 which led to greater tension and great fear in close circles of sisters.

In 1793 she was informed on and was thrown into prison on 24 December 1793 - her guilt was further espoused for French officials when she refused to take an oath of allegiance. On 15 January 1794 she was placed in her first of several interrogations and was kept in total isolation while remaining in prison.

She was sentenced to death via guillotine on 9 April 1794 (or 20th of the Germinal Year II); this took place at Poyannce Place and she was buried in a mass grave. In 1795 - after her execution - French officials involved in The Terror expressed their regret that such a woman "had been sacrificed in a barbarian manner on alleged grounds that still were not evidenced".

== Beatification ==
The process of beatification commenced in the Diocese of Aire-Dax with a diocesan process that spanned from 13 April 1907 until 8 February 1908; Bishop Eugene-François Touzet opened the process. This process was held as a means of evaluating the manner in which Rutan led her life and a means of learning about the manner of her death. One critical question that arose from such a process was whether or not there was a strong following of Rutan after her death.

In 1909 a request from Rome from the Congregation of Rites demanded another process be opened to ascertain whether or not Rutan was venerated on a broad scale following her execution since the acknowledgment of "non-cultus" would have been fatal to the cause and its potential continuation. On 13 December 1915 a decree was signed in which all of her writings were evaluated and were approved.

In 1916 the cause had still not been submitted to Rome but a decade-long wait between processes was waived. Pope Benedict XV – on 24 January 1917 – granted a decree that recognized the formal opening of the cause and proclaimed her to be a Servant of God. On 11 December 1918 the official statement from Rome was thus: "Marguerite Rutan had not been the object of a cult" and with that the process was closed. Despite this one final process opened and spanned from 1919 until 4 May 1922.

The cause received revitalization when a Mass was celebrated in 1994 to commemorate her death. Petitions led to the Congregation for the Causes of Saints granting approval at the resumption of the cause and reconfirmed her title of Servant of God under Pope John Paul II on 26 June 1998. The previous two processes were declared valid and were ratified on 17 October 1998. This allowed the postulation to compile the positio to document her life and death; it was sent to Rome in 2009. However historical consultants were forced to meet and approve the cause on 12 January 2010 due to its being deemed an "ancient" cause and more so due to it having been stalled for decades in the past.

Pope Benedict XVI – on 1 July 2010 – approved that Rutan had been killed in hatred of her Christian faith and thus allowed for her beatification to take place. Cardinal Angelo Amato – on the behalf of the pope – presided over the beatification on 19 June 2011.

The current postulator of the cause is Shijo Kanjirathamkunnel.
