= Aignes-et-Puypéroux =

- Part of Montmoreau
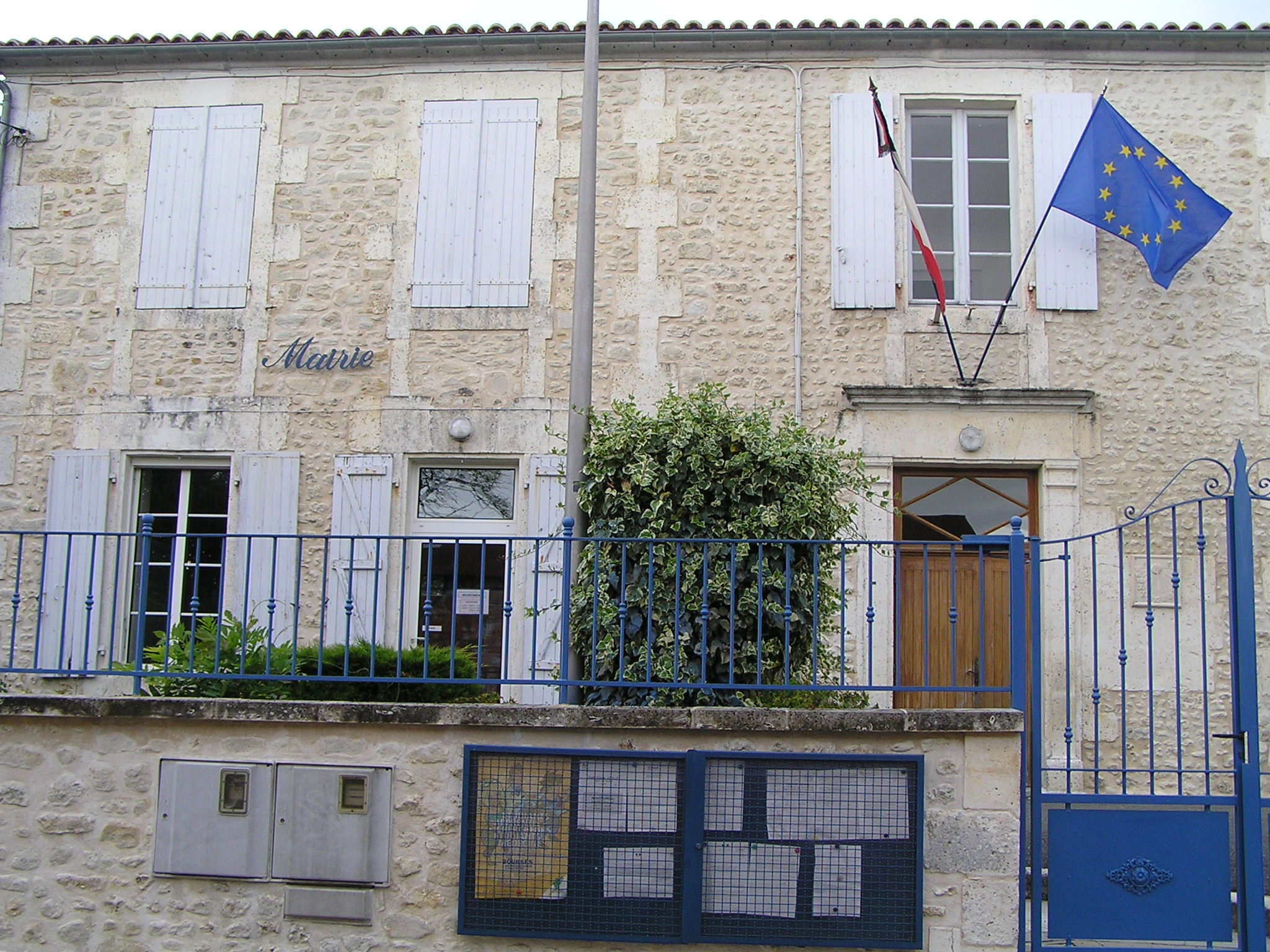
- Town hall
- Location of Aignes-et-Puypéroux
- Location within France Location within Nouvelle-Aquitaine
- Coordinates: 45°27′07″N 0°08′42″E
- Country: France
- Region: Nouvelle-Aquitaine
- Department: Charente
- Arrondissement: Angoulême
- Canton: Tude-et-Lavalette
- Commune: Montmoreau
- Area^{1}: 12.99 km^{2} (5.02 sq mi)
- Elevation: 141 m (463 ft)
- Highest elevation: 201 m (659 ft)
- Lowest elevation: 84 m (276 ft)
- Population (2018): 244
  - Density: 18.8/km^{2} (48.6/sq mi)
- Time zone: UTC+01:00 (CET)
  - Summer (DST): UTC+02:00 (CEST)
- Postal code: 16190
- ^{1} French Land Register data, which excludes lakes, ponds, glaciers > 1 km^{2} (0.386 sq mi or 247 acres) and river estuaries.

Aignes-et-Puypéroux (French pronunciation: [ɛɲ e pɥipeʁu]) is a former commune in the Charente department in the Nouvelle-Aquitaine region of southwestern France. On 1 January 2017, it was merged into the new commune Montmoreau.

== Geography ==
=== Location and access ===
Aignes-et-Puypéroux is a commune located 25 kilometres due south of Angoulême, in the Highway D674 which passes through the heart of the commune north to south and on to Montmoreau-Saint-Cybard. The Highway D54 also runs through the heart of the commune from Perignac in the west to the D16 in the south-east. Both highways intersect at the village of Aignes-et-Puypéroux.

The railway line from Paris-Austerlitz to Bordeaux-Saint-Jean passes through the southern part of the commune from north-east to south-west. The nearest train station is Montmoreau, some 10 km south of the commune, which is served by the TER running between Angoulême and Bordeaux.

=== Hamlets and localities ===
Hamlets are numerous in the commune, and several have some importance:

- Puypéroux in the far north where the abbey of the same name
- Chez Jambon, in the south of the commune
- Chez Boucher, in the western part
- Maine Guillien and Boisbourdeau, both south of the town of Aignes
- Les Héries and les Cardineaux, near the Moulin Brunet creek
- Le Bouet and la Gautrie near the road to Perignac
- La Croix, towards Chadurie
- Le Pétingaud and le Tavilard, close to the railway line.

=== Geology and terrain ===
The town is located in the limestone hills of the Aquitaine Basin dating from the Late Cretaceous period, as is all of the southern half of the department of Charente.

The limestone is in the form of chalk of the Campanian age over the entire municipal area. The ridge north of the town and a few peaks in the south are covered with deposits of the Tertiary period (Lutetian and Cuisian) composed of pebbles, sand and clay. The peaks and some slopes in the valleys exhibit formations of detrital rock and colluvium derived from bedrock and dated to the glaciations of the Quaternary period (Pliocene and Pleistocene).

The high plateau between the valleys of two rivers, is covered by 66% agricultural land and 34% forests and semi-natural lands.

The highest point of the commune is at an altitude of 201 metres, located at the northern end of the reservoir Croix de Verdelette. The lowest point is 84 metres, located at the southern edge of the commune along the Moulin d'Aignes Creek near its confluence with the Tude. The village of Aignes is at 145 metres above sea level 2.

=== Hydrography ===
Bounded on the north-west by the stream of Chaverrut (name of the upstream part of the Arce), a sub-tributary of the Charente and in the south by the Tude, a tributary of the Dronne and sub-tributary of the Dordogne. The territory of the municipality is split between the two basins of the Charente (17% of the area) and the Gironde (83% of the area).

There are also several streams, all tributaries of the Tude: the Dead Water Stream, Gouyat Pond stream (also called Ribérat in its upper part), Moulin d'Aignes Creek, and the Moulin Brunet stream.

The clayey nature of the soil on the peaks is favourable to some small water reservoirs and springs and fountains (Fontaine Jeannot, fontaine du Coursier, fontaine du Chat, source Saint-Gilles, etc.).

=== Climate ===
As in three-quarters of the department in the south and west, the climate is oceanic Aquitaine.

== Toponymy ==
The name Aignes comes from the patron saint of the village, Agnès. In Greek, agnê means "pure".

Puypéroux comes from the Latin Podium Petrosum meaning "stony hill".

== History ==
The commune of Aignes-and-Puypéroux, created in 1793 under the name of Aigne was renamed Agne-et-Puispérou in 1801, then Aignes-et-Puypéroux later. It was, until 1970, part of the Canton of Blanzac and was integrated into the Canton Montmoreau-Saint-Cybard at that date.

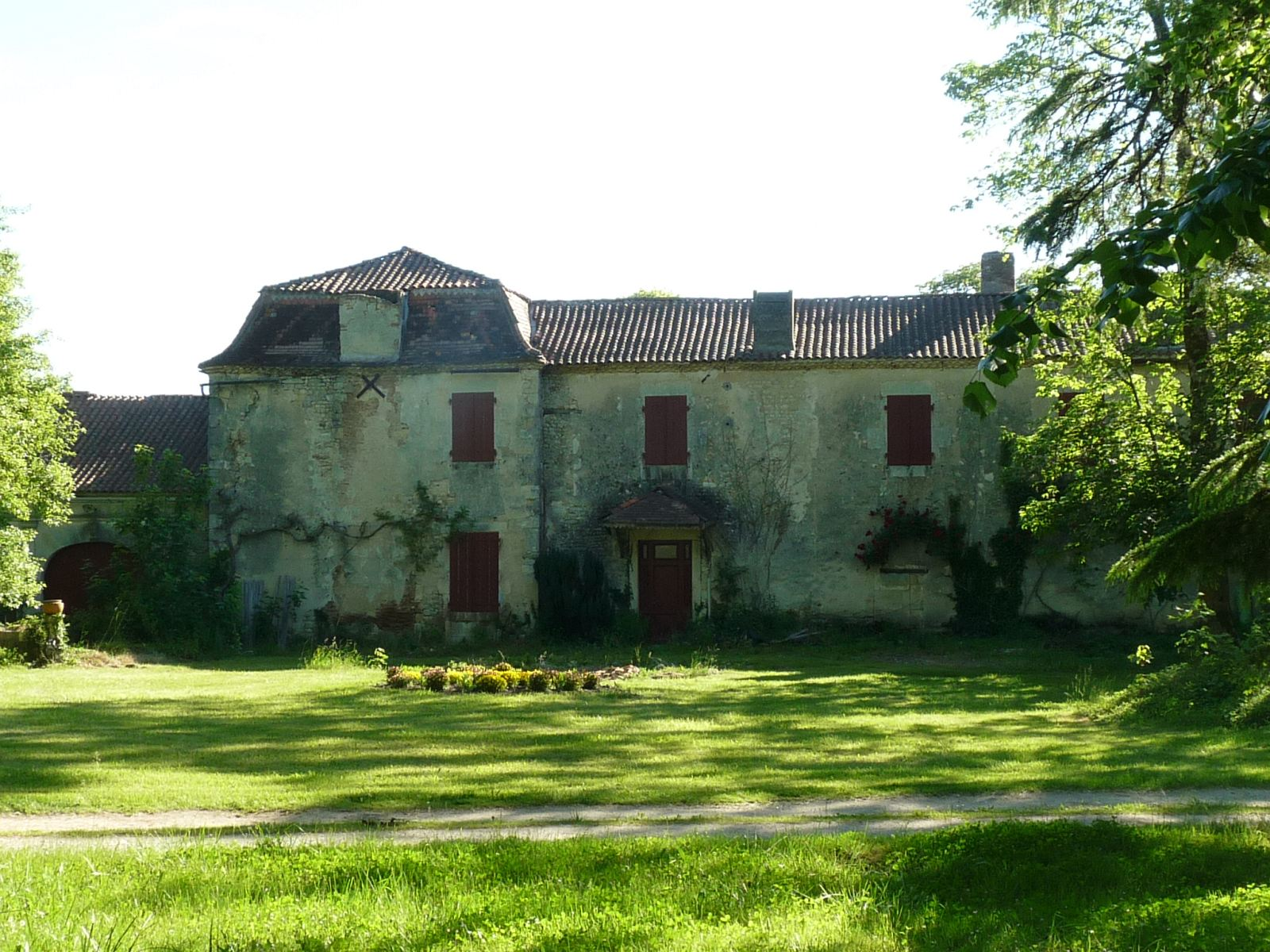
Old Stately home

There can be seen in the village of Aignes a former stately home, once the seat of a fief which fell under the lordship of la Faye. In 1541, the lordship of Aignes acquired it through Antoine de Viaud and it remained in the family until the end of the 17th century.

At that time the lordship was held by Gaston Pierre de Viaud, a captain in the regiment of Navarre. His daughter, Gabrielle Catherine, wife of Philippe Auguste Mastin of Nuaillé, who had a dowry of the land of Aignes. The Mastin family still owned Aignes at the time of the Revolution.

At the beginning of the 20th century, the house was owned by Mr. L. Tabuteau, the mayor of the town.

The most remarkable monument of the town is the Church of Puypéroux, built on top of a high hill, which juts like a promontory between two narrow valleys. The church also contains the tomb of Saint Gilles, its founder, and has been the subject of a beautiful restoration.

The church was, in the beginning, an abbey of Benedictine monks founded, if tradition is to be believed, in the 6th century. Later, the community could not support themselves, the monks retired to Blanzac and the Puypéroux monastery became a simple monastic priory.

This priory retains some importance even to the 15th century, at which time it was destroyed by the English. The buildings were burned, the monks retreated to the cloisters of Blanzac, abandoning their possessions.

From 1836, Puypéroux was the mother house of the Society of Sisters of Our Lady of the Angels, to whom we owe the restoration of the church by the architect Barbaud.

At the beginning of the 20th century, the tradition of annual pilgrimage to the tomb of St. Giles was still practiced.

== Administration ==
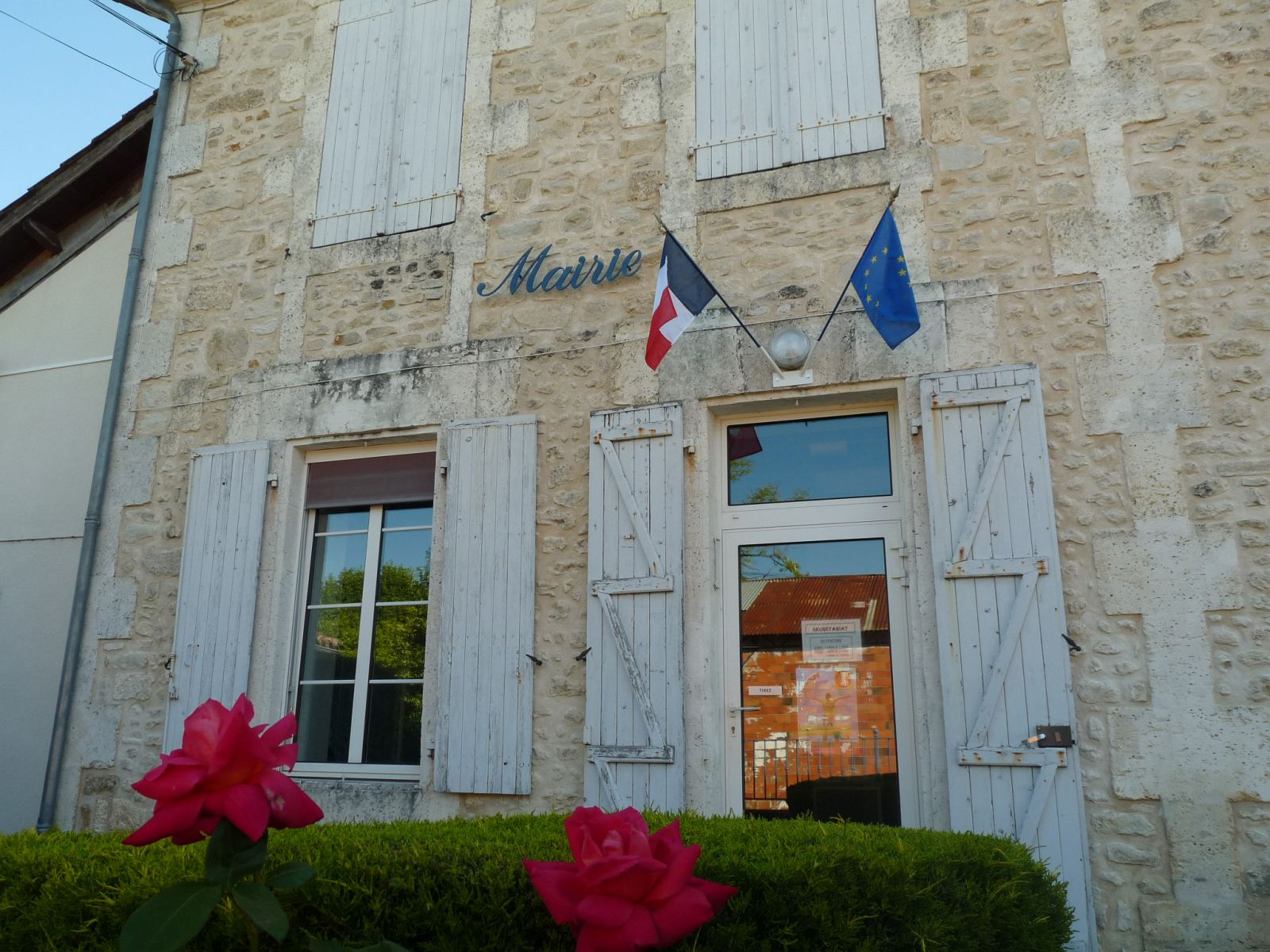
The Town Hall

List of Successive Mayors of Aignes-et-Puypéroux

| From | To | Name | Position |
|---|---|---|---|
| 2001 | 2008 | Jean Dade | |
| 2008 | 2017 | Carole Marty | Secretary |

== Population ==
Historical population
| Year | Pop. | ±% p.a. |
|---|---|---|
| 2006 | 277 | — |
| 2011 | 262 | −1.11% |
| 2018 | 244 | −1.01% |
Source: INSEE

== Facilities, services, and local life ==
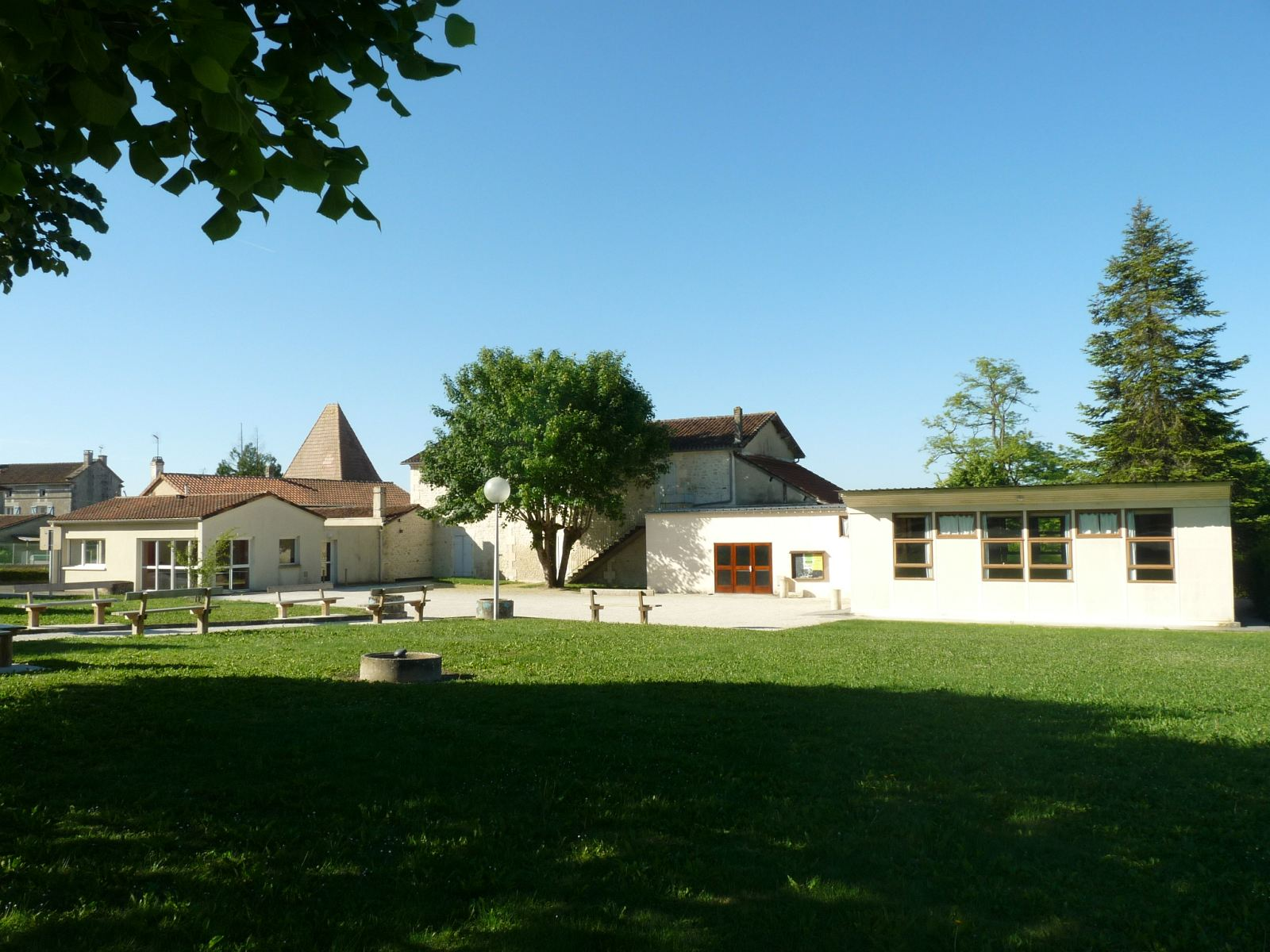
Community Hall

=== Education ===
The school is a RPI between Chavenat and Aignes. Both Chavenat and Aignes have an elementary school.

=== Sport ===
The commune has a field for ULM (Ultralight aviation). The club is called the ULM club montmorélien.

== Culture and heritage ==
=== Civil heritage ===
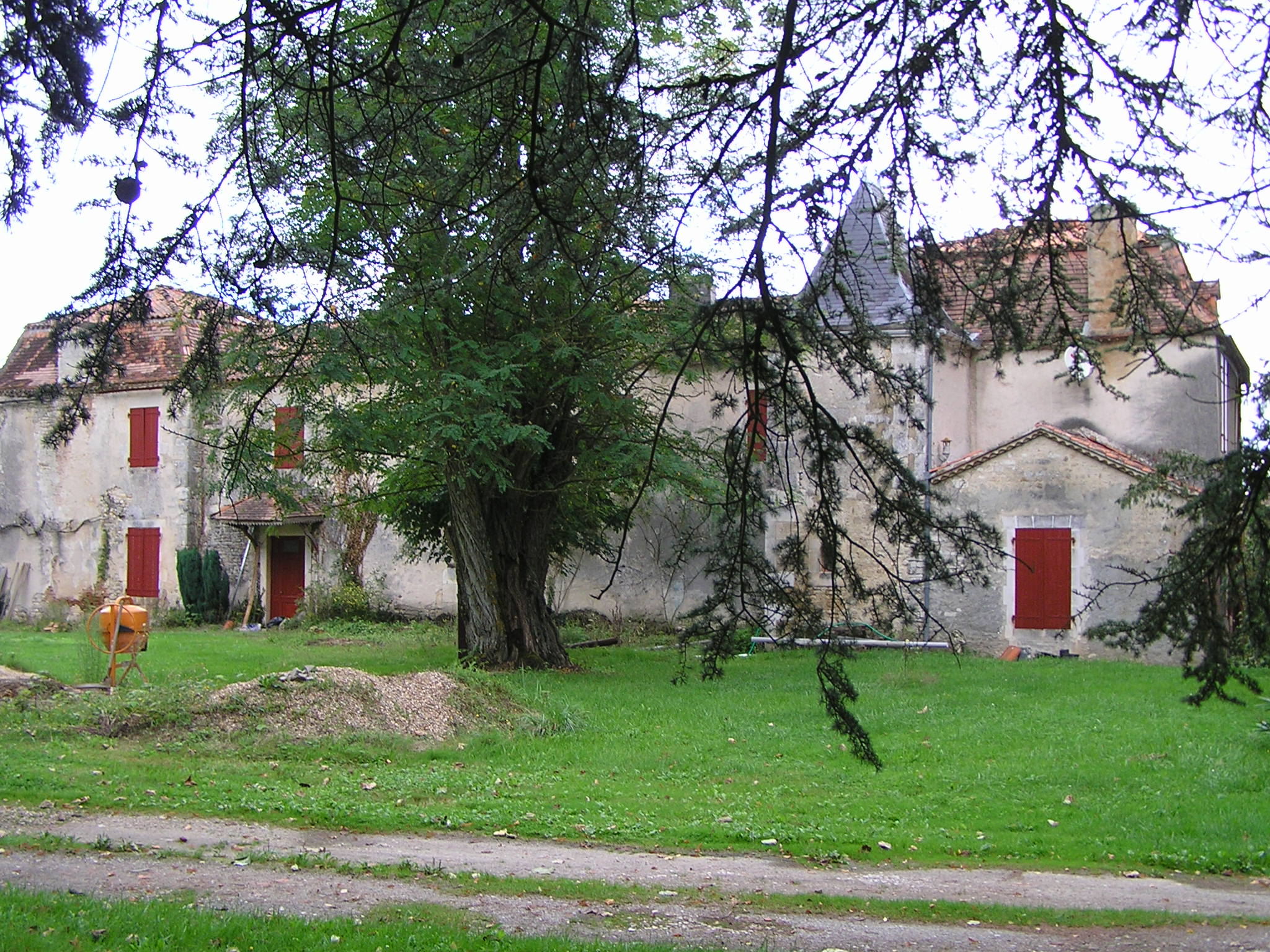
The derelict chateau

- Castle: in the village there is a chateau dating back to the end of the 18th century. The grounds of the castle are a "listed site".

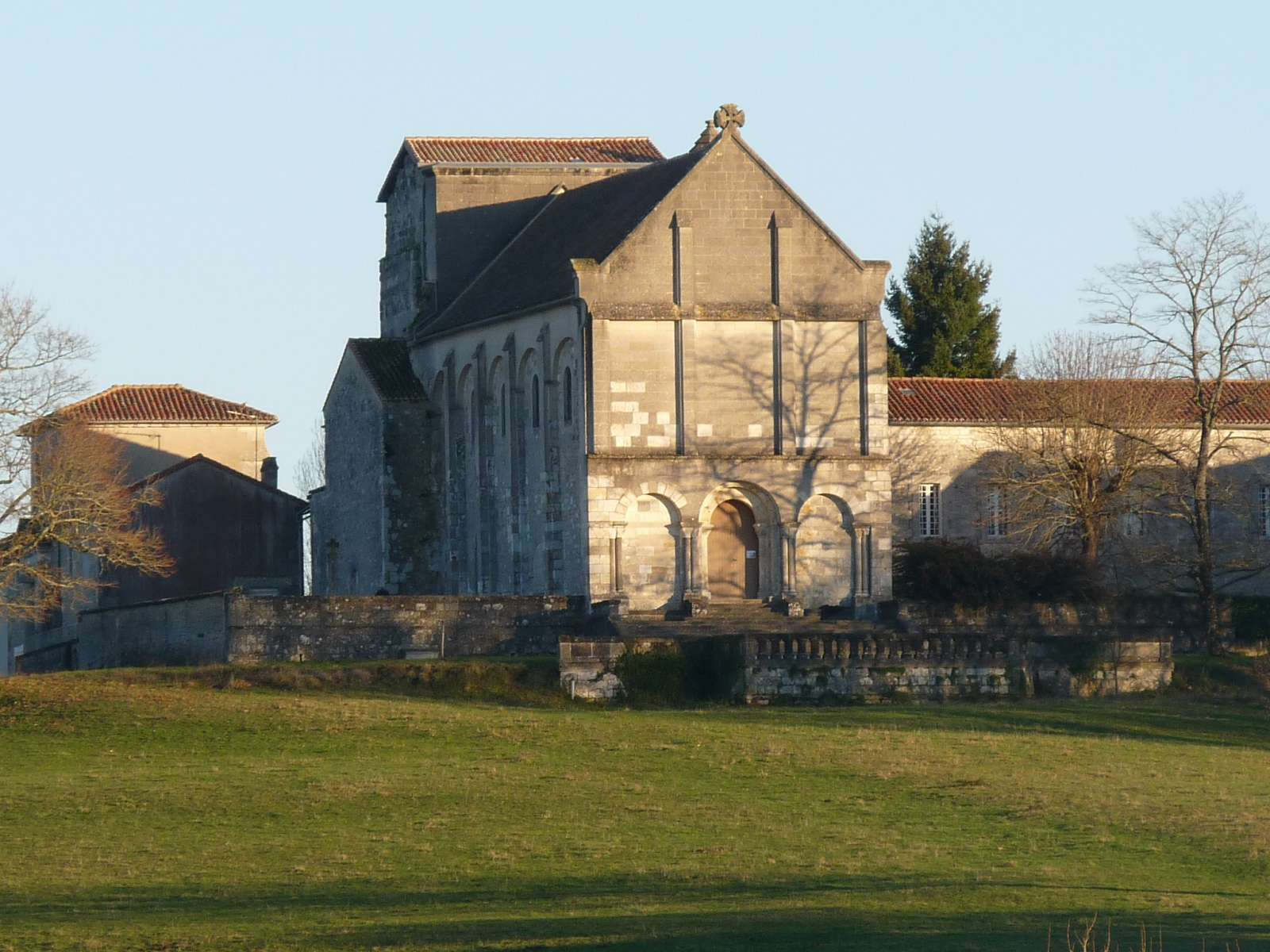
Puypéroux Abbey

=== Religious Heritage ===
Puypéroux Abbey (11th century) was founded before 925 according to tradition by Saint Gilles; the church being rebuilt at the latest in the middle of the 11th century due to:

- the small embellishments in the walls of the nave
- the decoration of the Imposts in that part
- the imposts on the side and on the apse

All are reminiscent of the same era of primitive Romanesque architecture.

The transept, from a little later period, contains very archaic sculptures of great archaeological value. Only the facade was rebuilt in the 12th century, around the year 1130. It has an octagonal dome and a pentagonal choir with the original font.

The site of the abbey is a "listed site".

Other sites of interest

- The Tomb of Saint Gilles is located in the second bay of the church of Puypéroux.
- The Puypéroux Fountain is a place of processions during drought.
Puypéroux Abbey

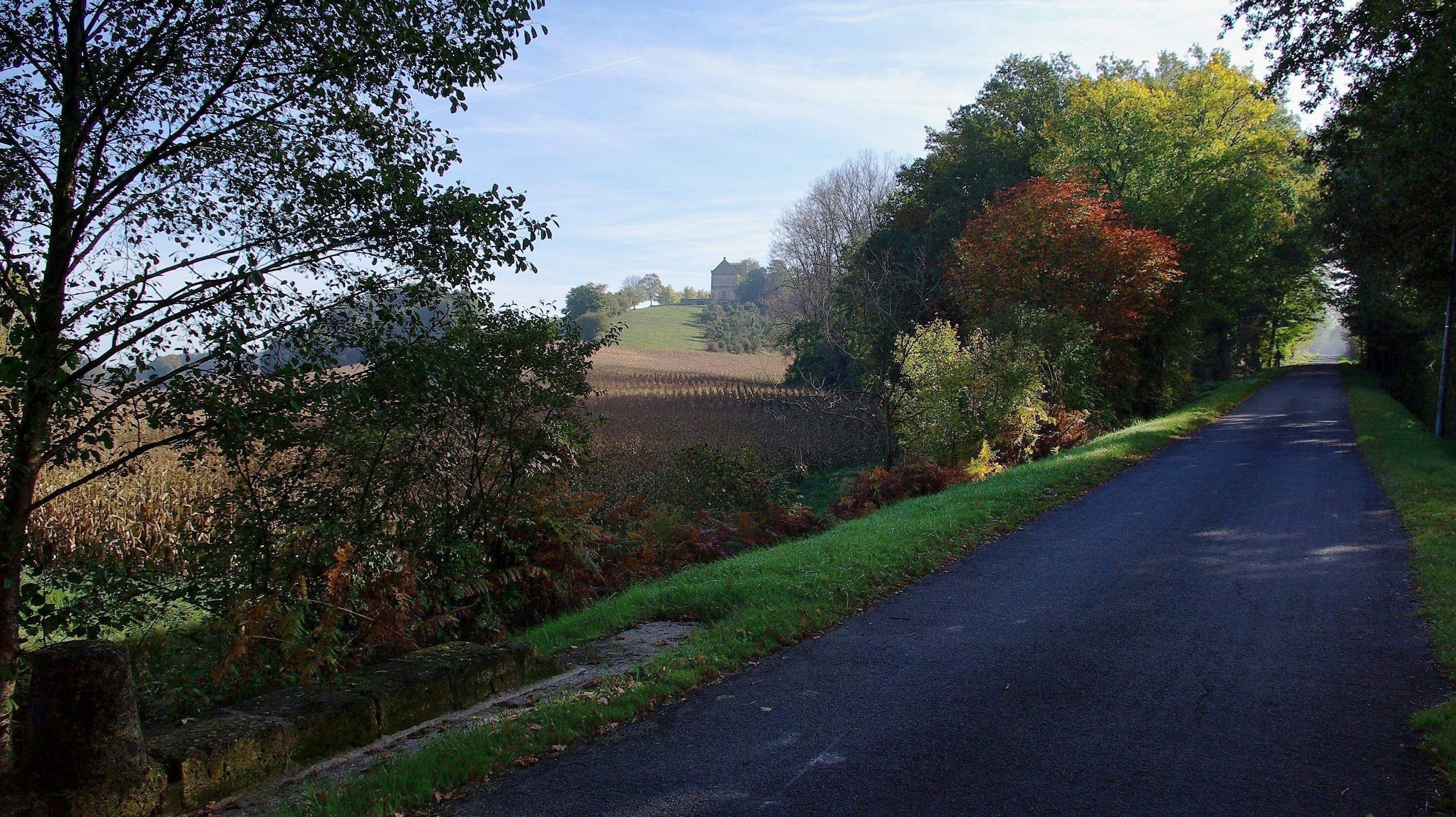
View from the D54 of Puypéroux Abbey

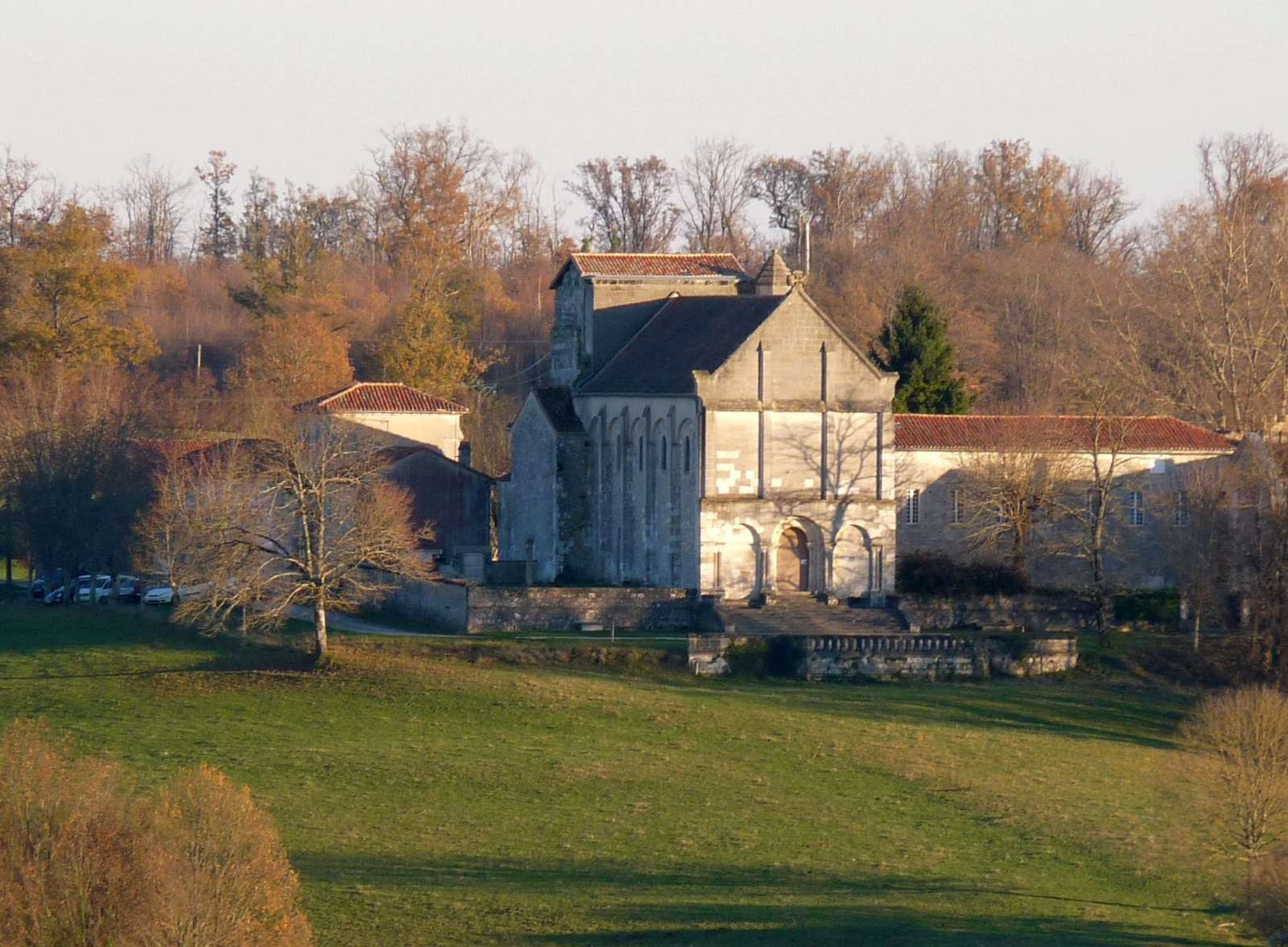

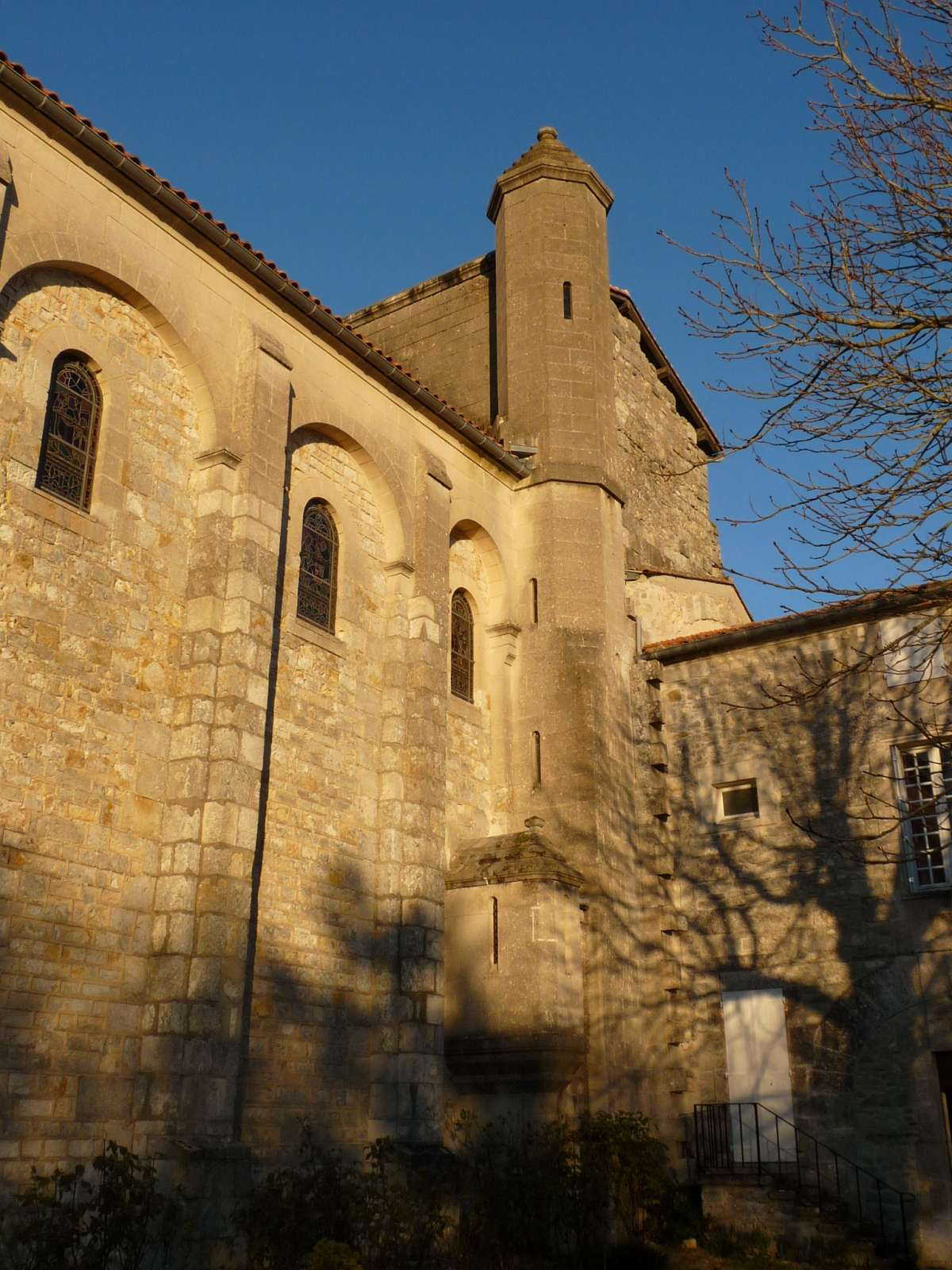

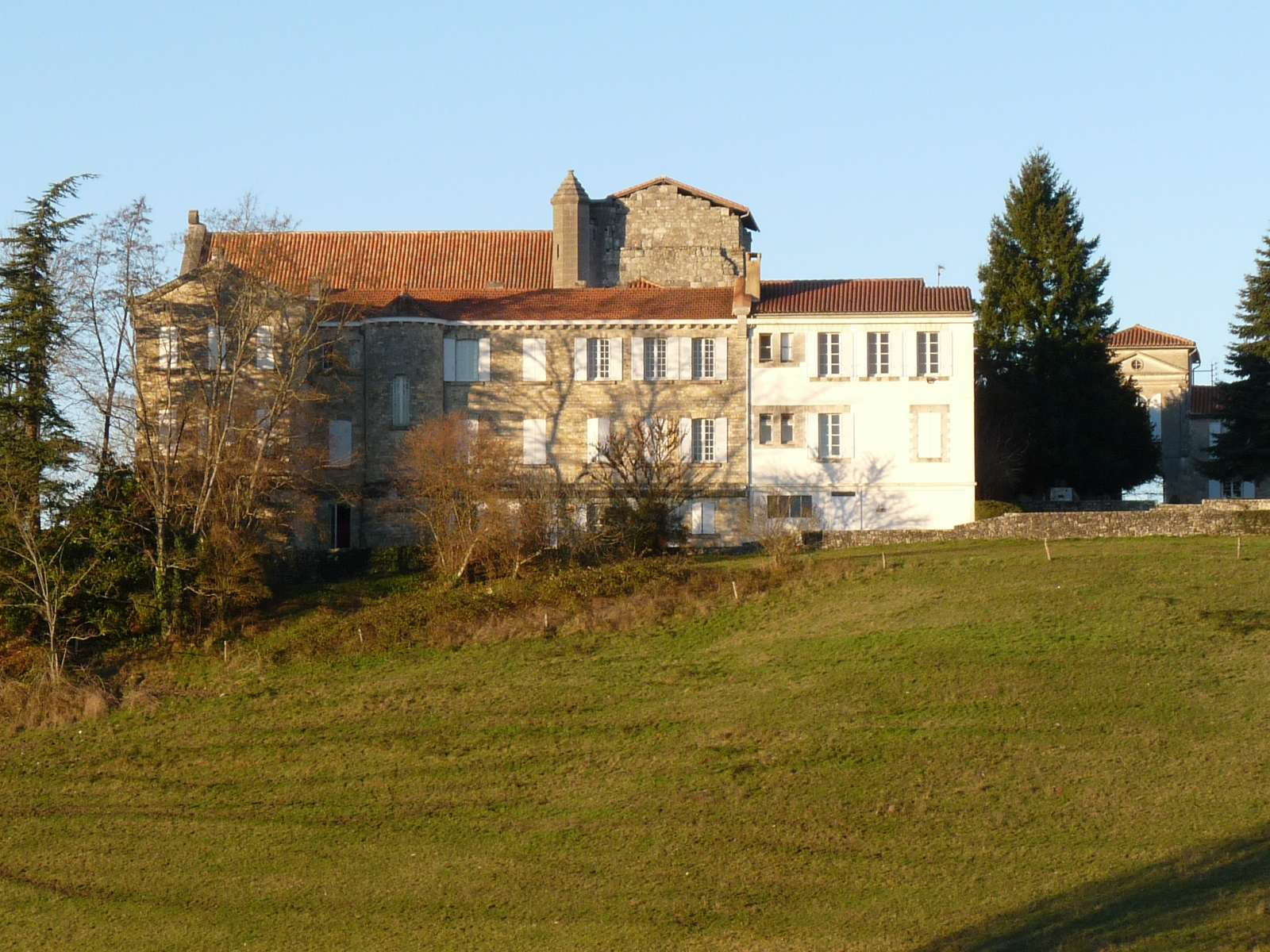

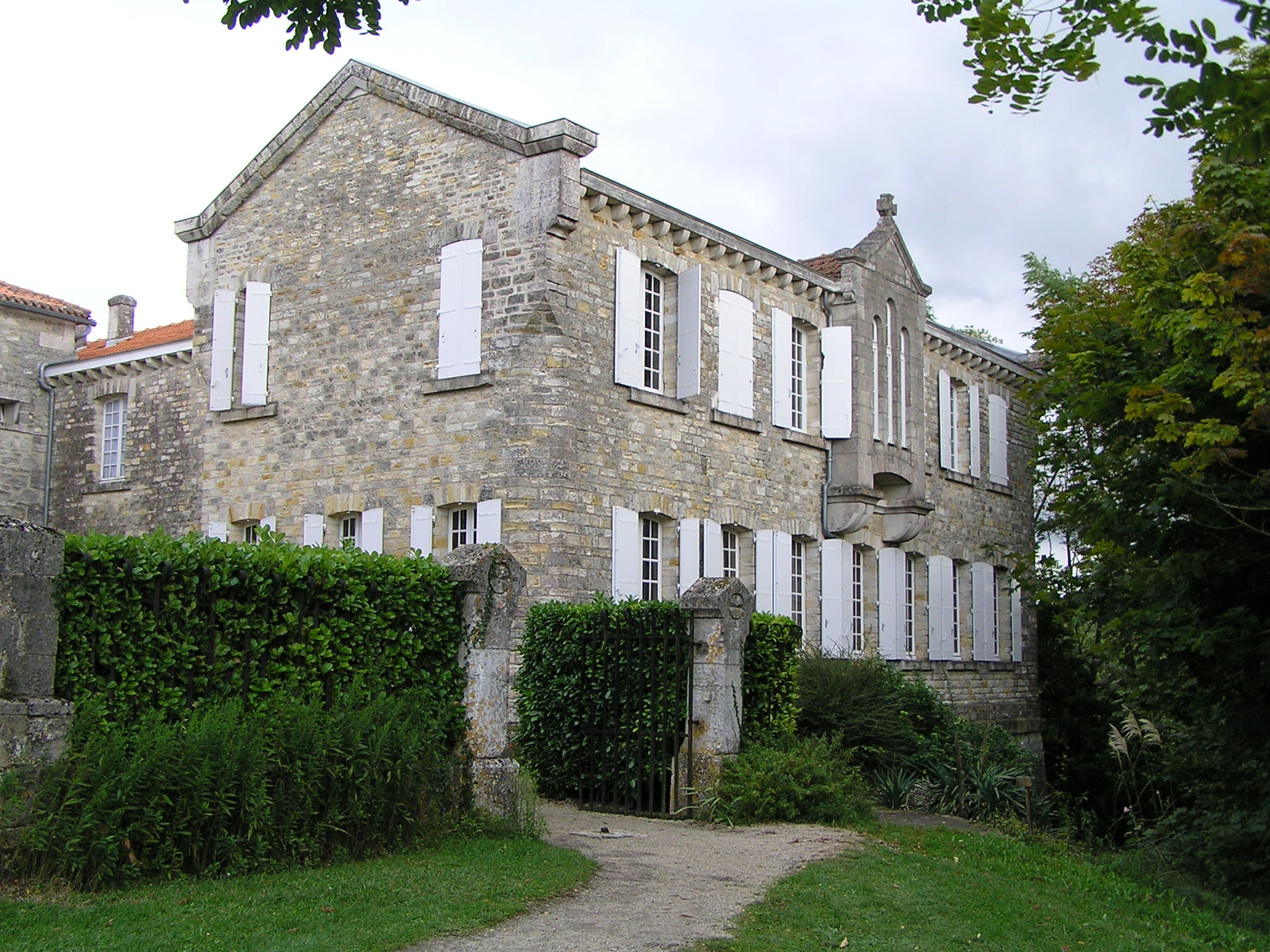

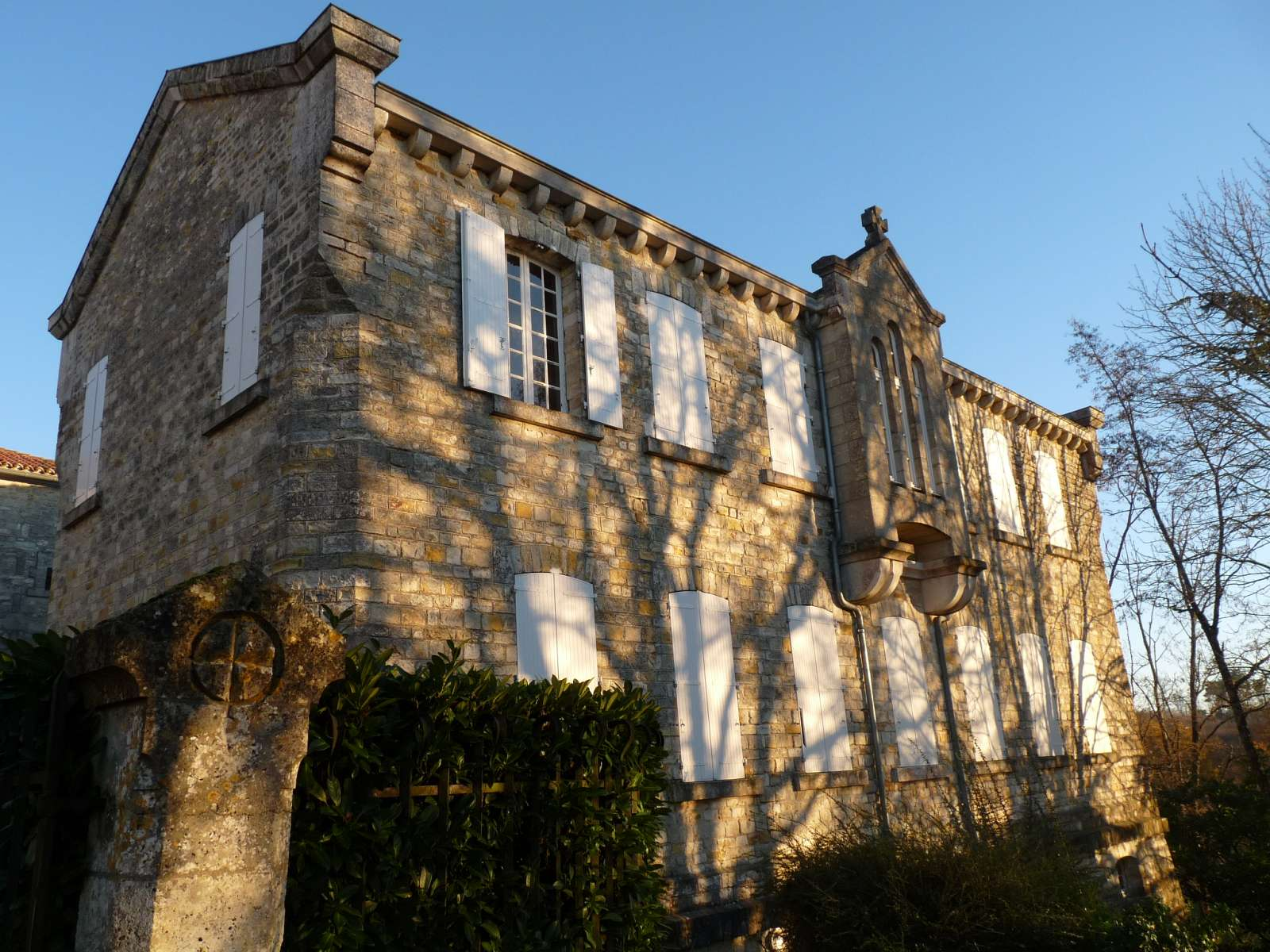

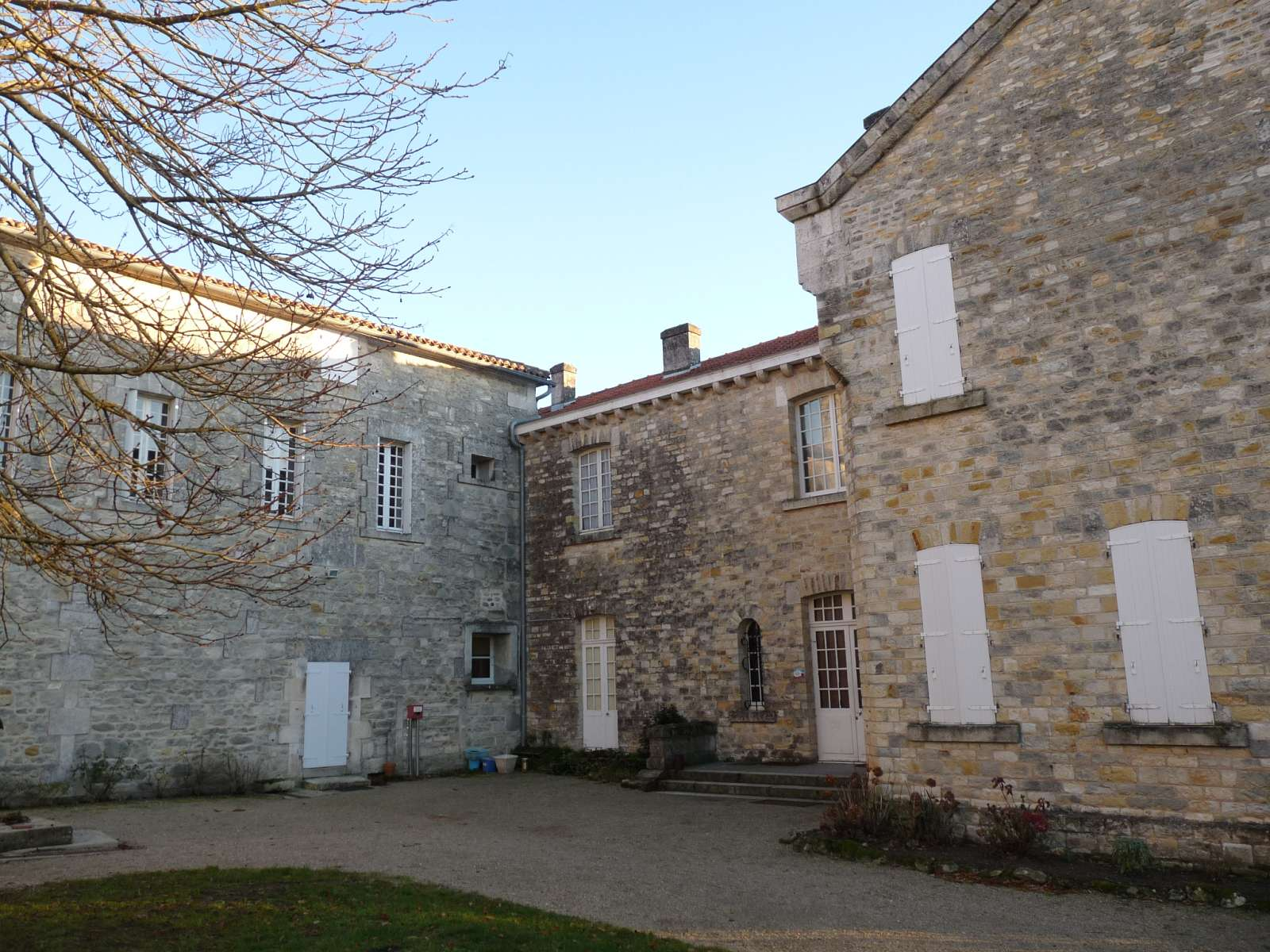
- The Church of Saint-Martial of Aignes: there is no documentation of the date of this old church. The nave, in very poor condition, was repaired in 1838 and 1879. The bases of the columns, their curved imposts, and their method of construction suggest a date for the oldest parts of the last quarter of the 12th century. The remains of a funeral litter are visible on the north wall of the nave.
Church of Saint-Martial

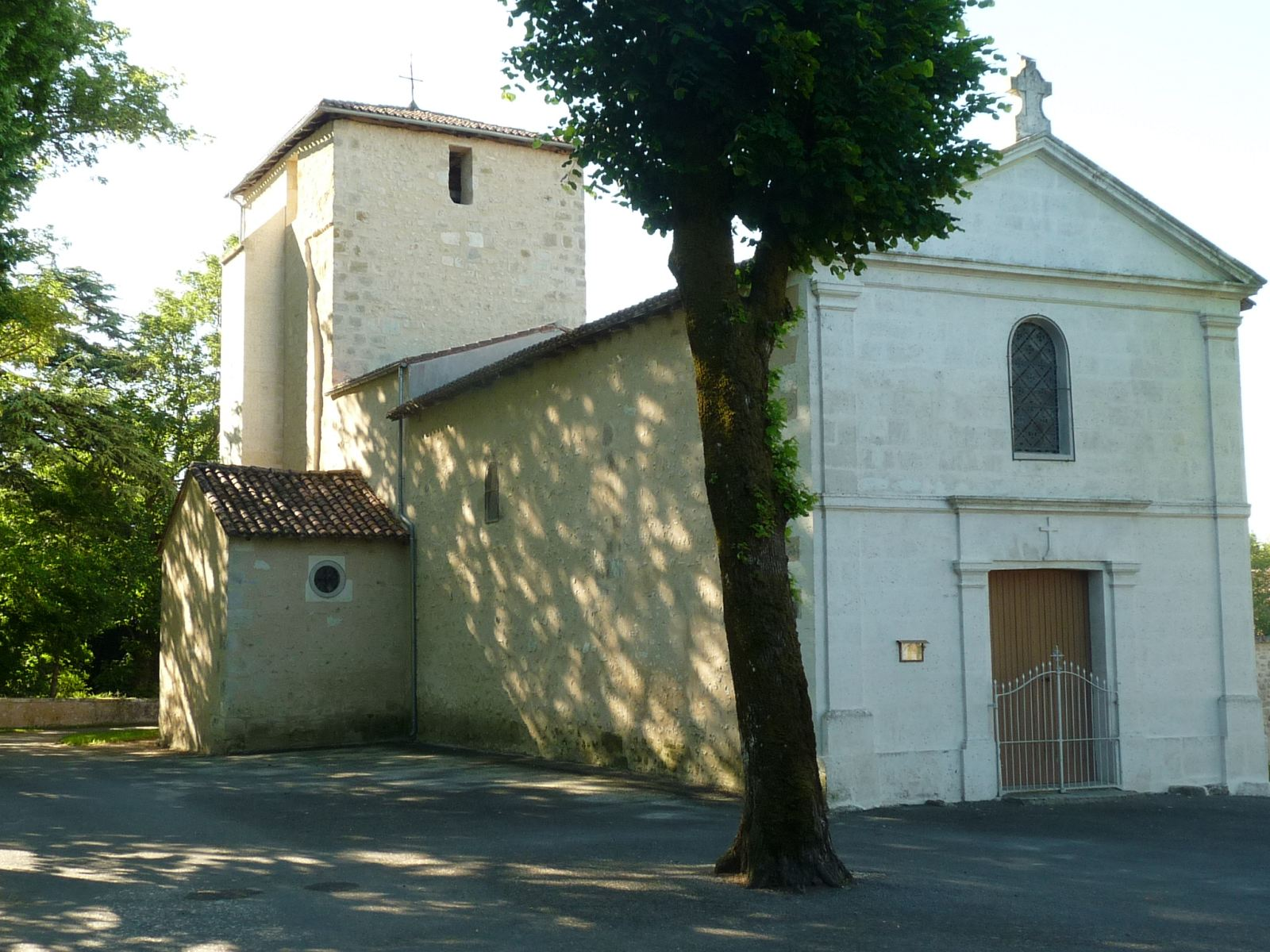
Church of Saint-Martial of Aignes

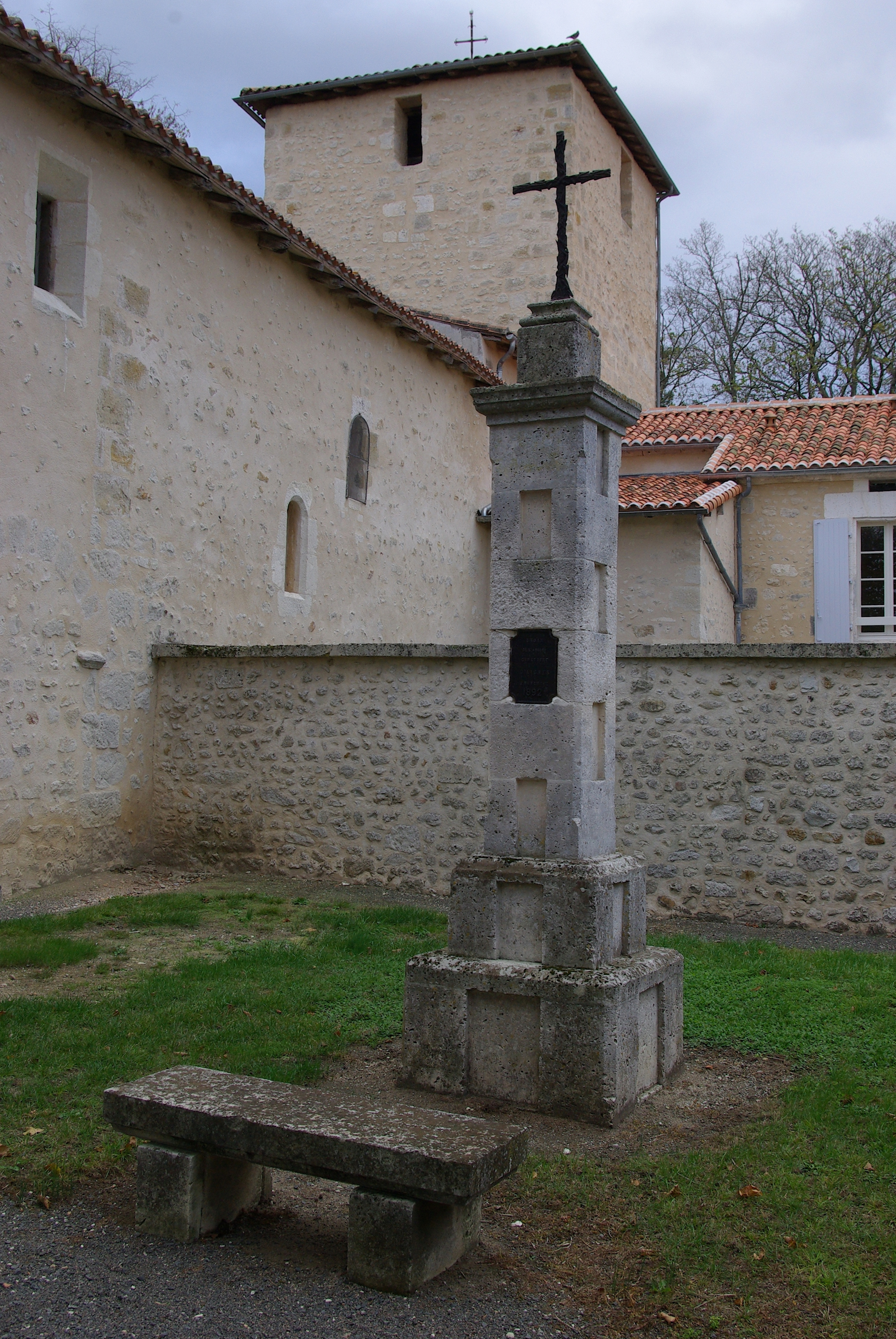
Old cross in the cemetery

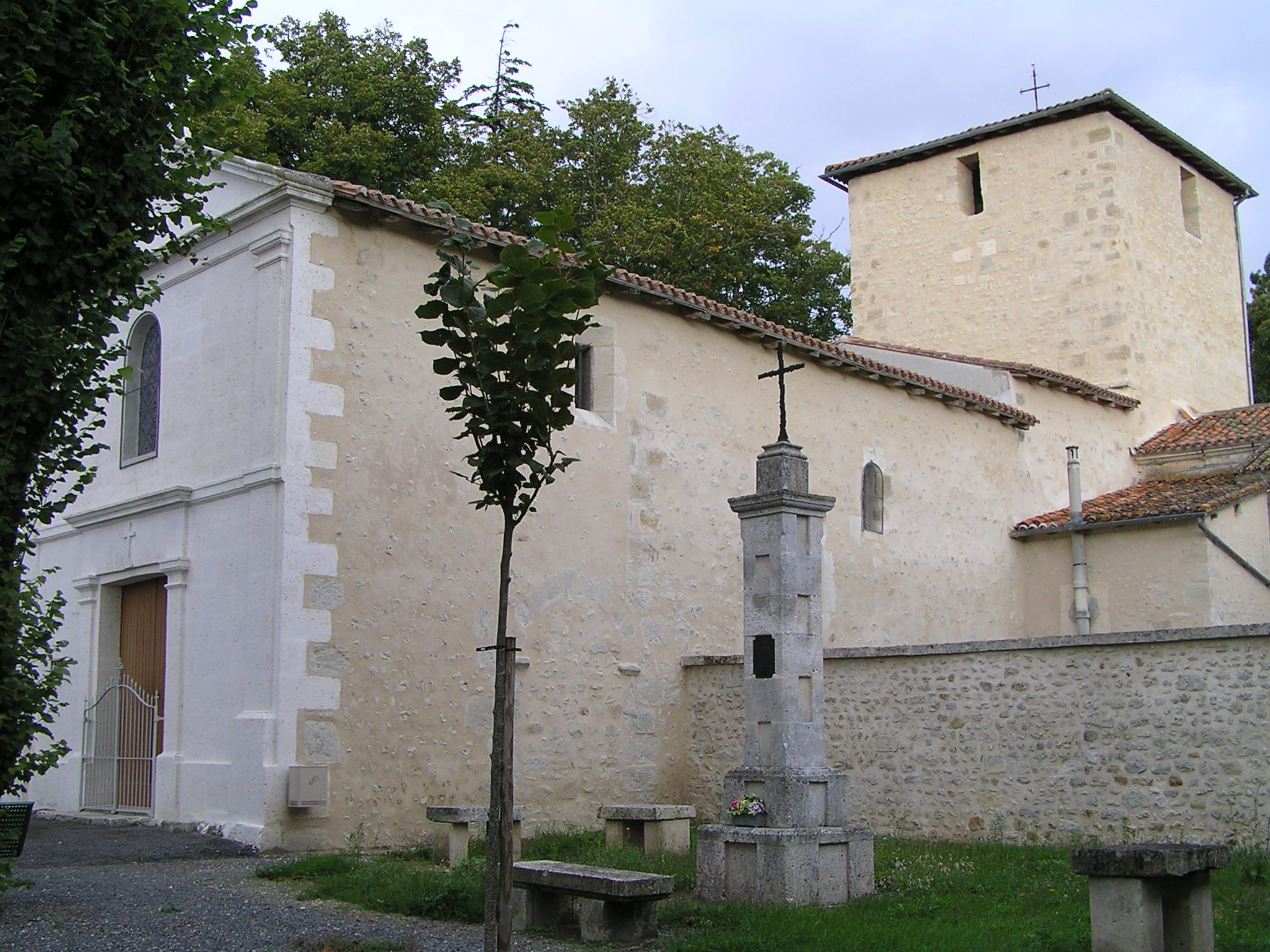

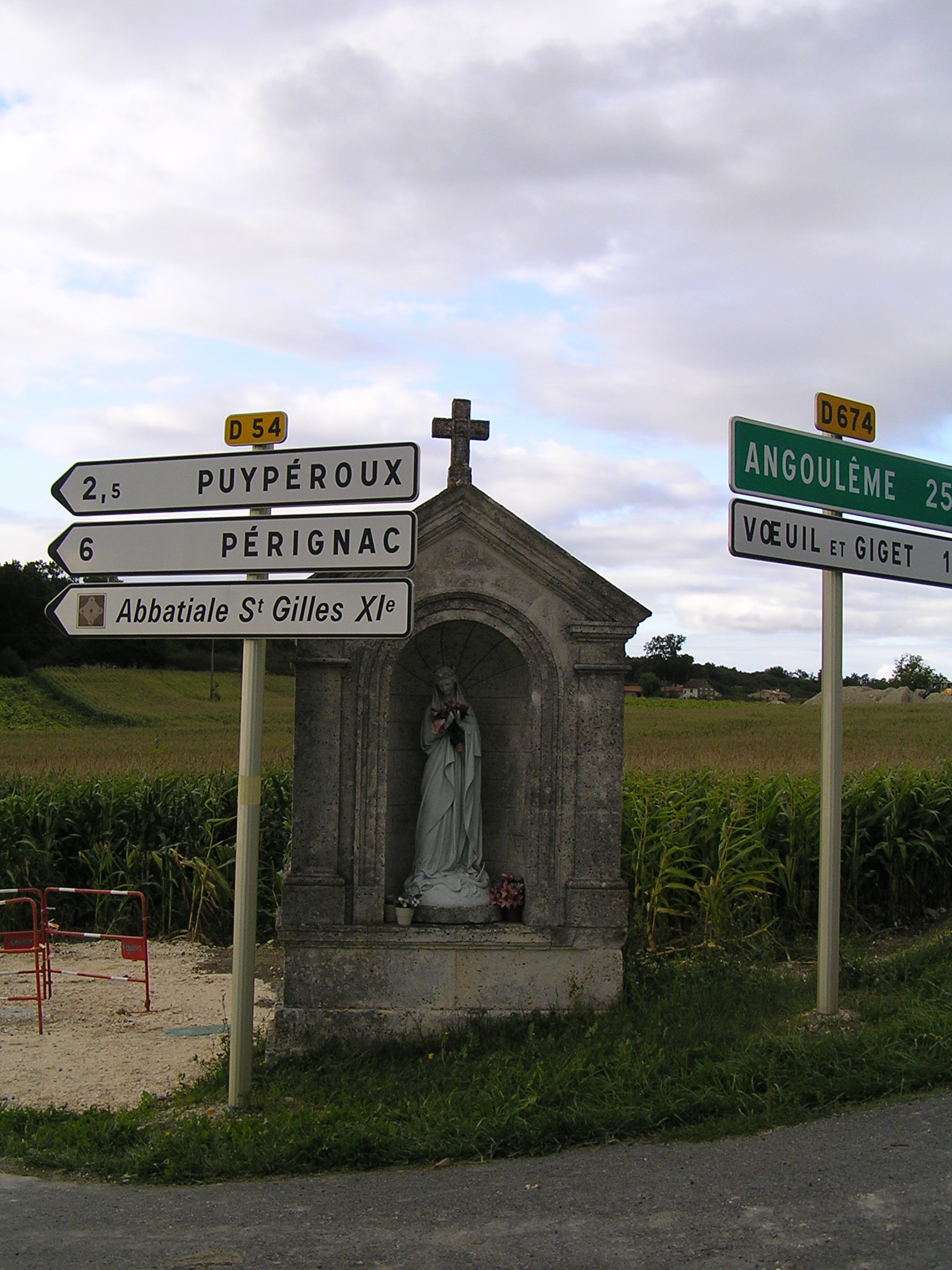
An Oratory on the road to Puypéroux

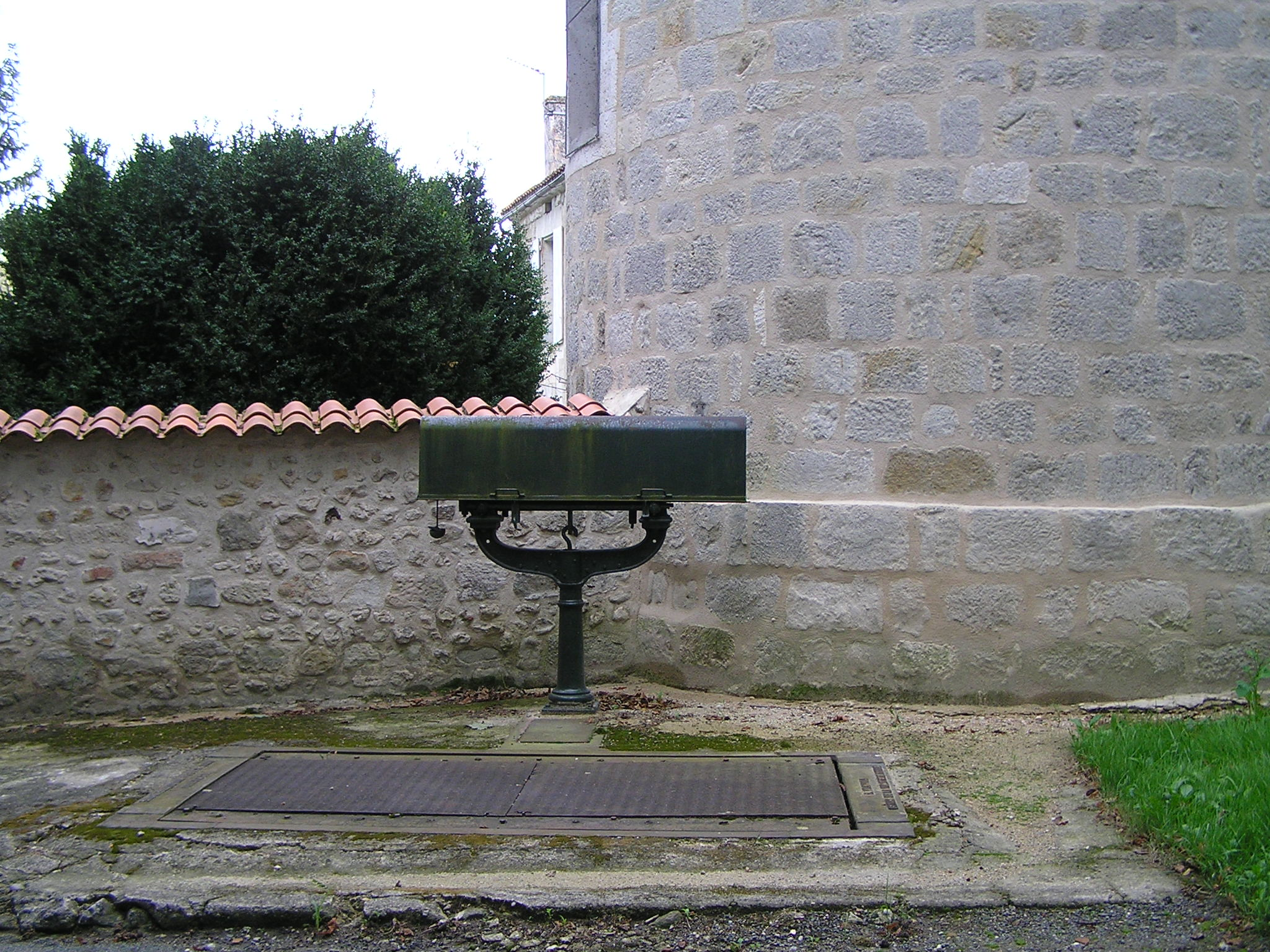
Public weighbridge at the Church

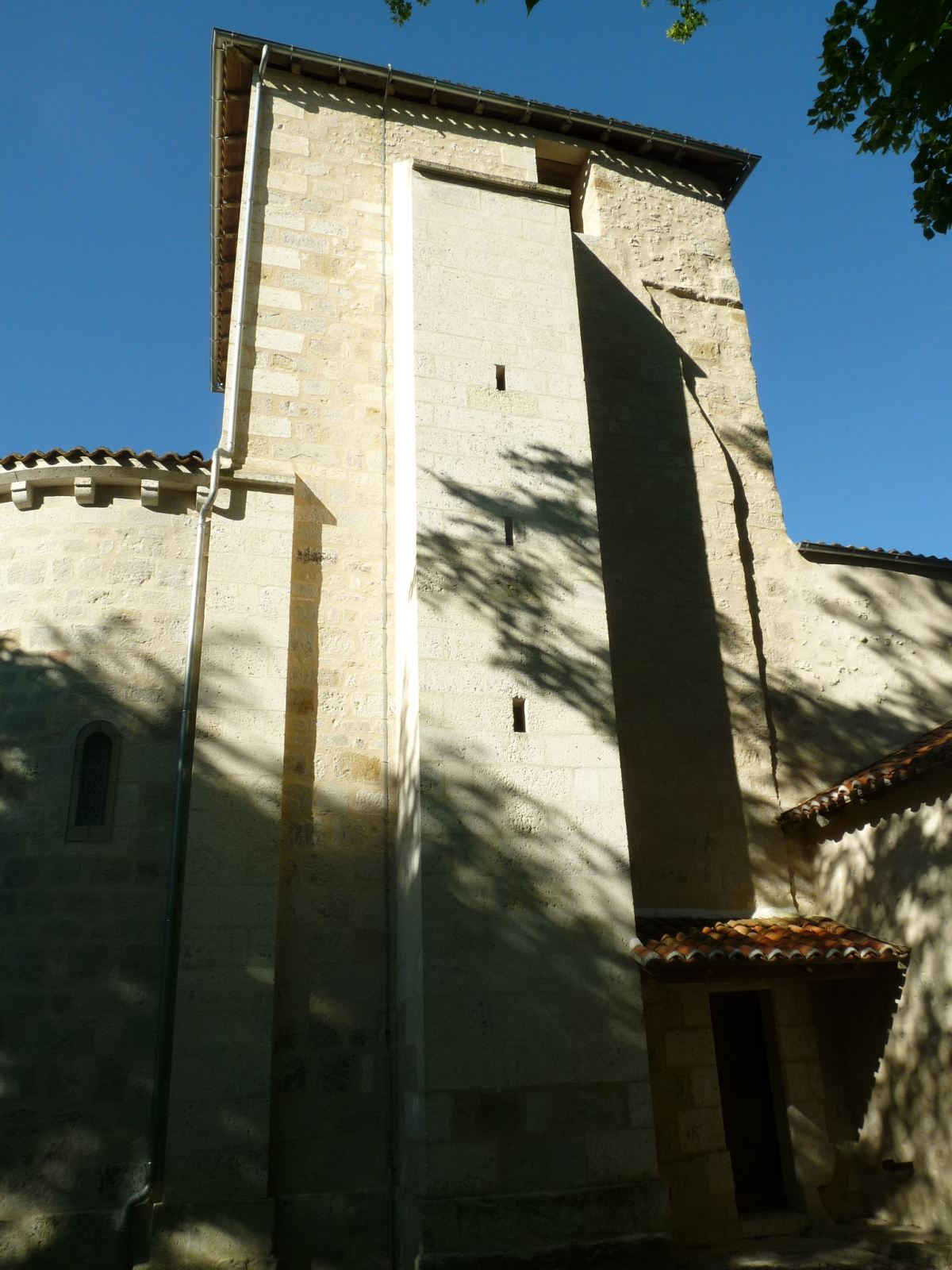

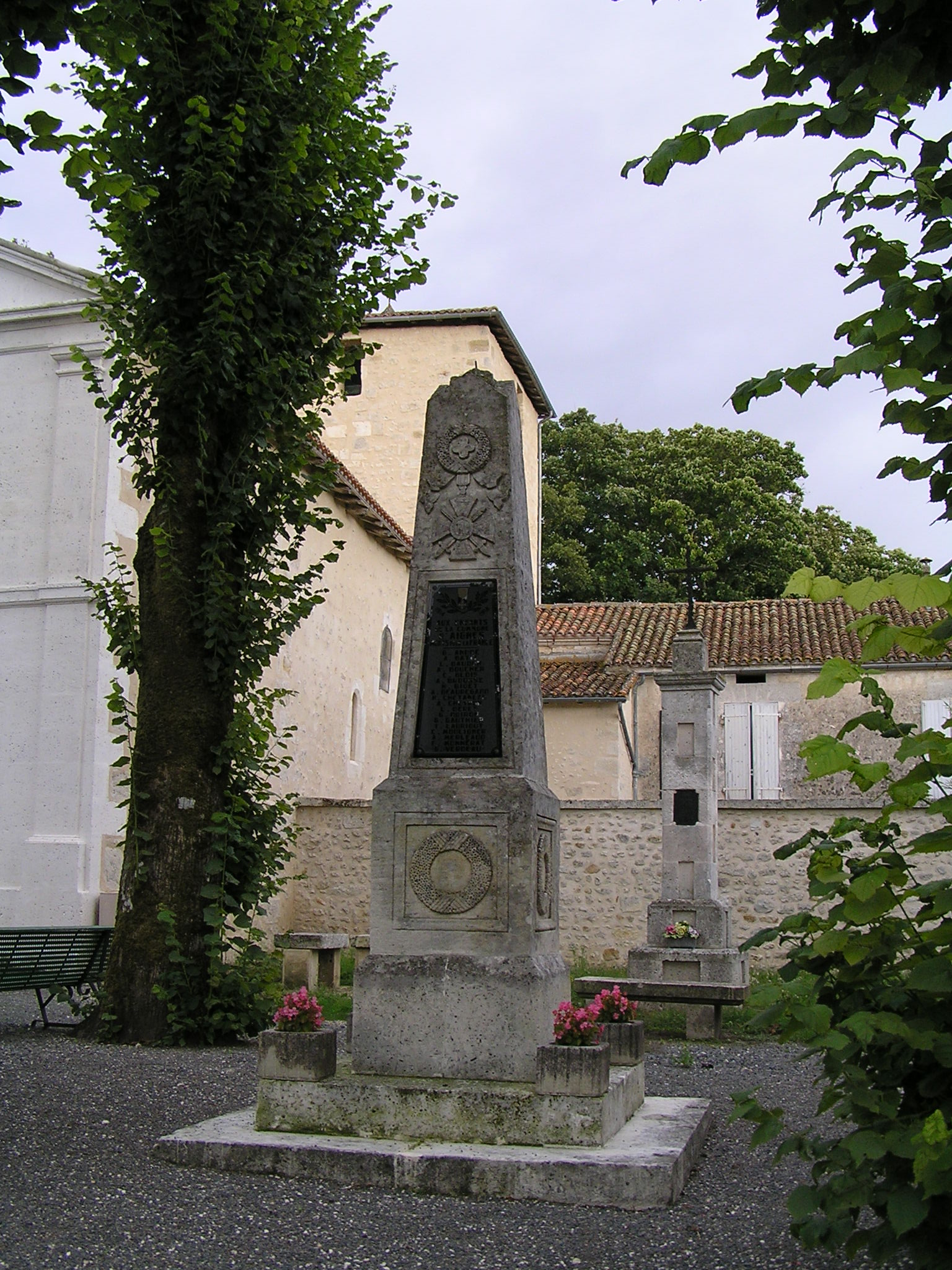
The War memorial

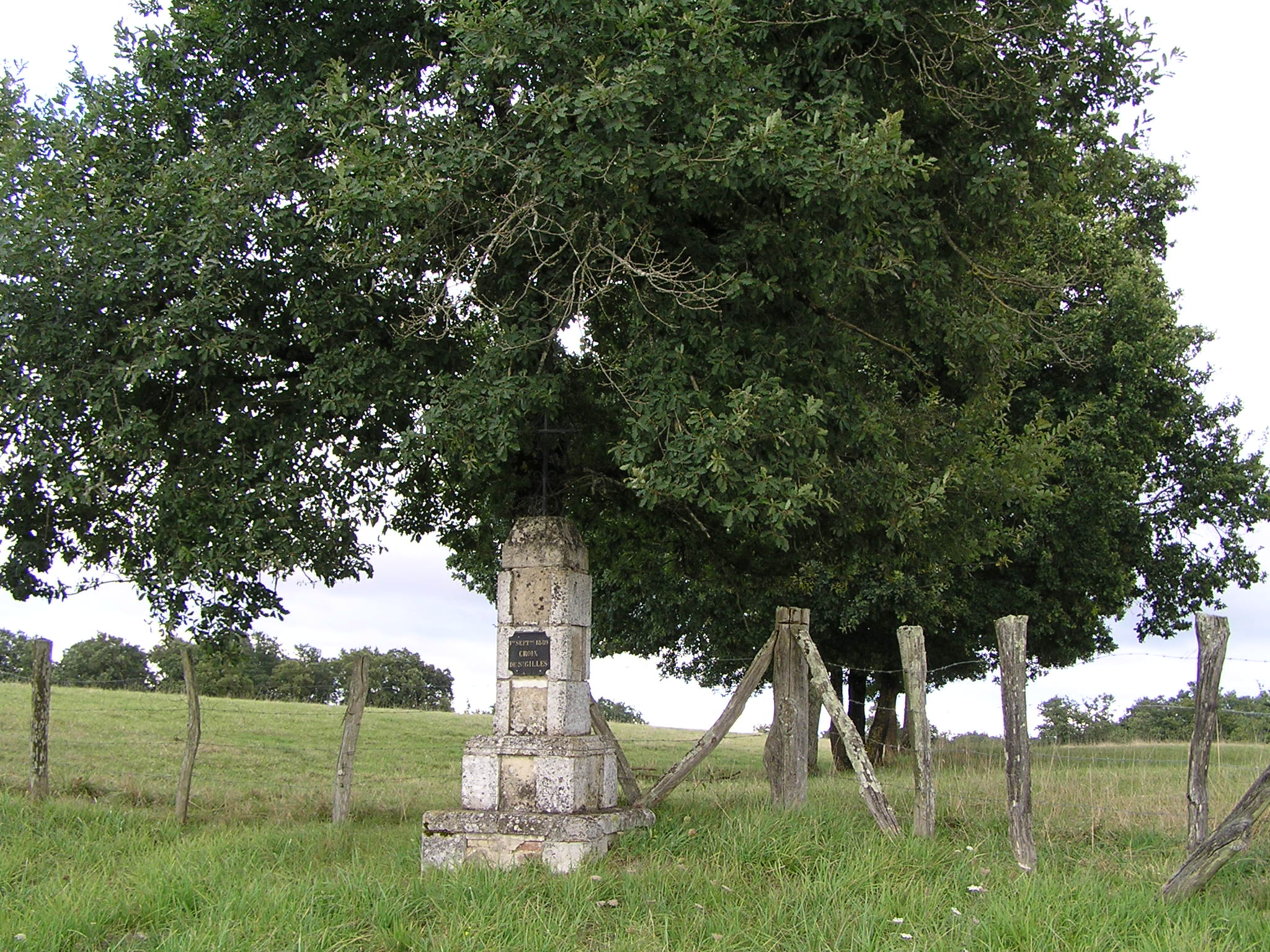
A Wayside Cross

=== Environmental heritage ===
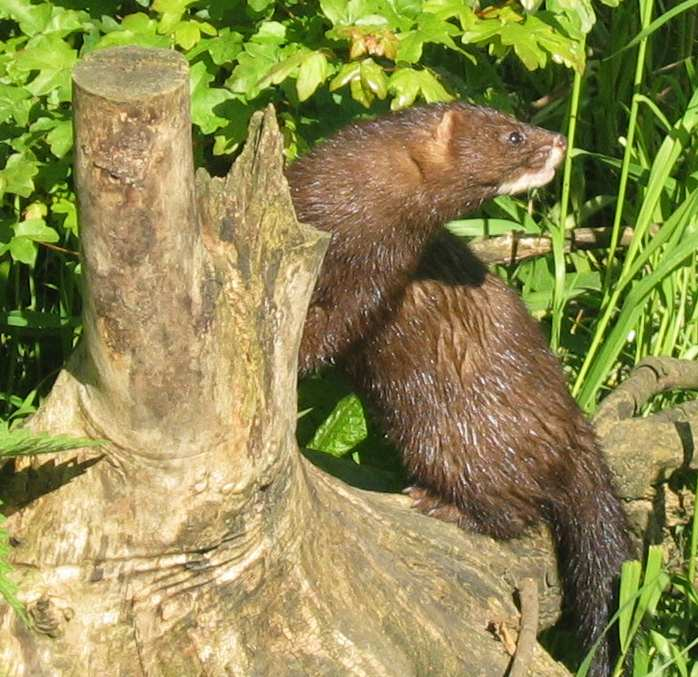
European mink

In the north, straddling the communes of Aignes and Chadurie, the Landes de Bois Rond are classified as a Natural Zone of ecological interest for fauna and flora (ZNIEFF) of type I.

Many types of wildlife can be seen: nesting birds such as the hen harrier, the nightjar, the Dartford warbler and the common grasshopper warbler; amphibians such as the yellow-bellied toad, the tree frog, the marbled newt and the natterjack toad; also plants such as long leaf oats and the bicolor Phalangère.

The Valley of the Tude and the valley of the Arce are classified as Natural Zones of ecological interest for fauna and flora of type II under French regulations, and zones of Natura 2000 from a European point of view. They are characterized mainly by the presence of the European mink, an endangered species.

== See also ==
- Communes of the Charente department
