= Saint-Amant-de-Montmoreau =

- Part of Montmoreau
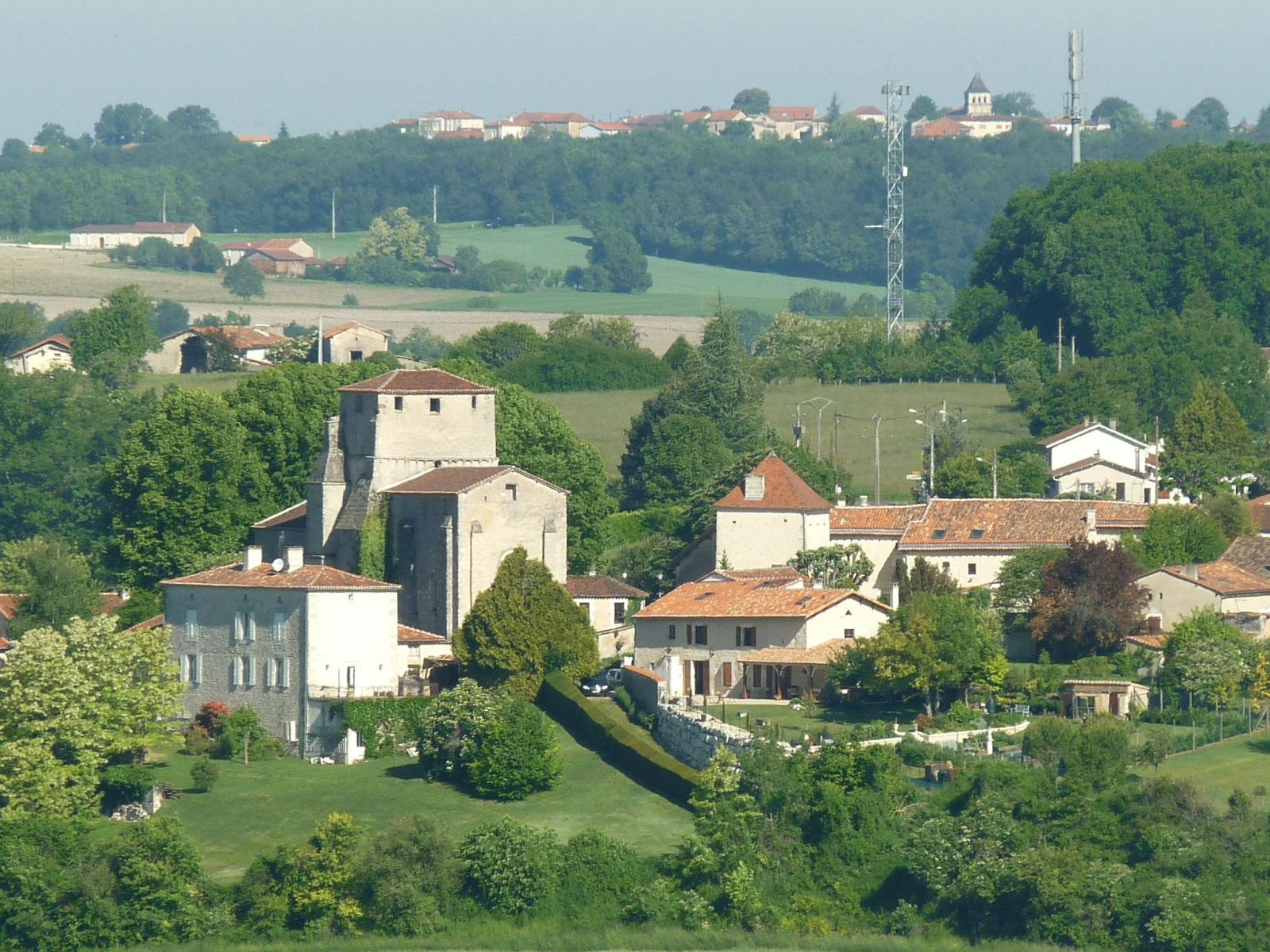
- Location of Saint-Amant-de-Montmoreau
- Location within France Location within Nouvelle-Aquitaine
- Coordinates: 45°23′46″N 0°09′27″E
- Country: France
- Region: Nouvelle-Aquitaine
- Department: Charente
- Arrondissement: Angoulême
- Canton: Tude-et-Lavalette
- Commune: Montmoreau
- Area^{1}: 27.2 km^{2} (10.5 sq mi)
- Elevation: 140 m (460 ft)
- Highest elevation: 191 m (627 ft)
- Lowest elevation: 70 m (230 ft)
- Population (2018): 687
  - Density: 25.3/km^{2} (65.4/sq mi)
- Time zone: UTC+01:00 (CET)
  - Summer (DST): UTC+02:00 (CEST)
- Postal code: 16190
- ^{1} French Land Register data, which excludes lakes, ponds, glaciers > 1 km^{2} (0.386 sq mi or 247 acres) and river estuaries.

Saint-Amant-de-Montmoreau (French pronunciation: [sɛ̃.t‿amɑ̃ də mɔ̃mɔʁo], literally Saint-Amant of Montmoreau; before 2013: Saint-Amant) is a former commune in the Charente department in southwestern France. On 1 January 2017, it was merged into the new commune Montmoreau.

== Population ==
Historical population

Year	Pop.	±% p.a.
1793	1,089	—
1800	1,046	−0.57%
1806	974	−1.18%
1821	1,179	+1.28%
1831	1,151	−0.24%
1841	1,050	−0.91%
1846	1,098	+0.90%
1851	1,106	+0.15%
1856	1,065	−0.75%
1861	993	−1.39%
1866	978	−0.30%
1872	975	−0.05%
1876	971	−0.10%
1881	946	−0.52%
1886	892	−1.17%
1891	855	−0.84%
1896	872	+0.39%

Year	Pop.	±% p.a.
1901	872	+0.00%
1906	890	+0.41%
1911	860	−0.68%
1921	795	−0.78%
1926	782	−0.33%
1931	813	+0.78%
1936	776	−0.93%
1946	705	−0.95%
1954	693	−0.21%
1962	663	−0.55%
1968	631	−0.82%
1975	603	−0.65%
1982	660	+1.30%
1990	665	+0.09%
1999	646	−0.32%
2006	661	+0.33%
2018	687	+0.32%

Source: EHESS and INSEE (2018)

== See also ==
- Communes of the Charente department
