= Montmoreau =

- Commune
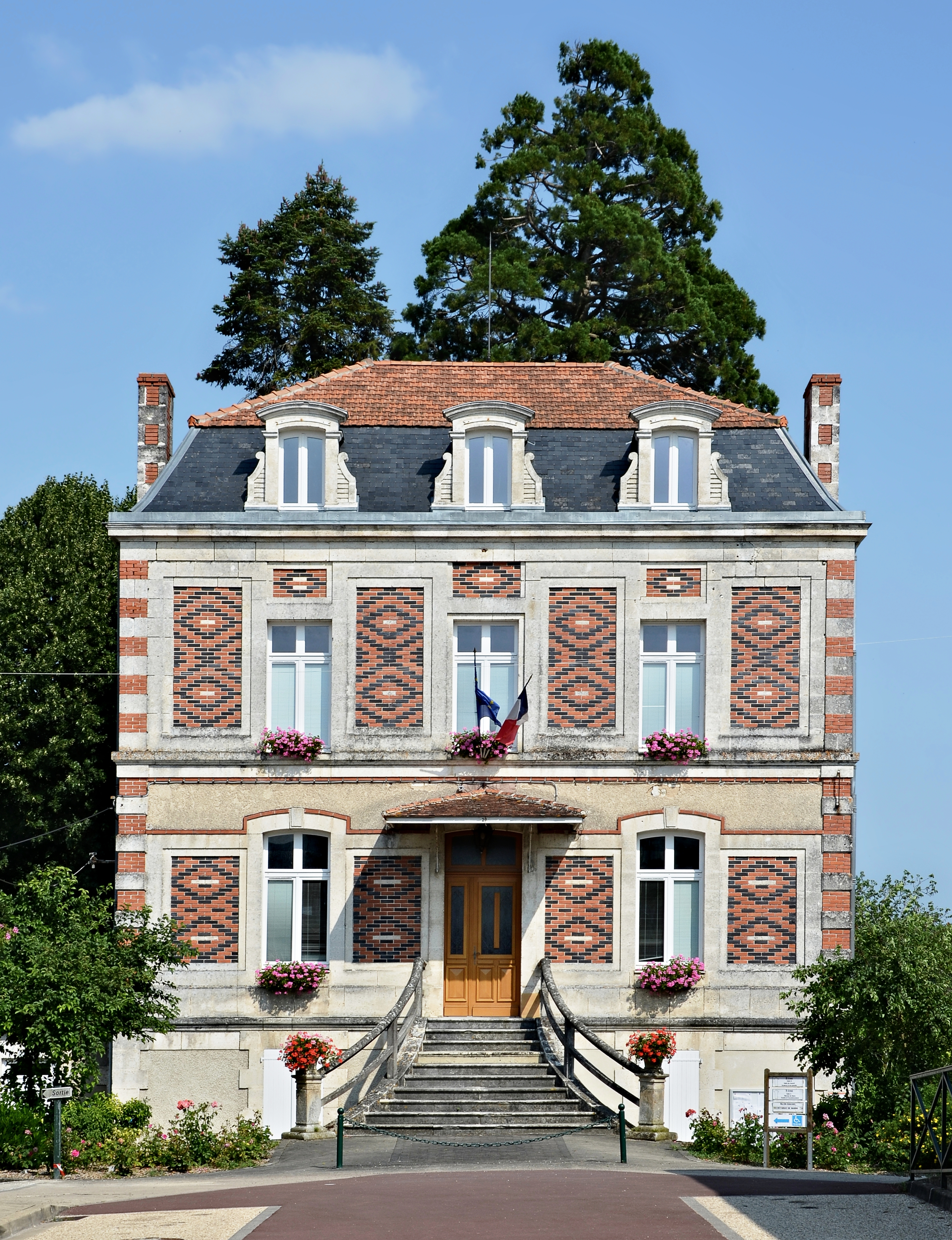
- The town hall in Montmoreau

- Coat of arms
- Location of Montmoreau
- Location within France Location within Nouvelle-Aquitaine
- Coordinates: 45°24′00″N 0°07′55″E
- Country: France
- Region: Nouvelle-Aquitaine
- Department: Charente
- Arrondissement: Angoulême
- Canton: Tude-et-Lavalette
- Intercommunality: Lavalette Tude Dronne

Government
  - Mayor (2020–2026): Jean-Michel Bolvin
- Area^{1}: 64.85 km^{2} (25.04 sq mi)
- Population (2023): 2,403
  - Density: 37.05/km^{2} (95.97/sq mi)
- Time zone: UTC+01:00 (CET)
  - Summer (DST): UTC+02:00 (CEST)
- INSEE/Postal code: 16230 /16190
- ^{1} French Land Register data, which excludes lakes, ponds, glaciers > 1 km^{2} (0.386 sq mi or 247 acres) and river estuaries.

Montmoreau (French pronunciation: [mɔ̃mɔʁo]) is a commune in the department of Charente, southwestern France. The municipality was established on 1 January 2017 by merger of the former communes of Montmoreau-Saint-Cybard (the seat), Aignes-et-Puypéroux, Saint-Amant-de-Montmoreau, Saint-Eutrope and Saint-Laurent-de-Belzagot.

== Population ==
Population data refer to the commune in its geography as of January 2025.

Historical population
Year	Pop.	±% p.a.
1968	2,478	—
1975	2,519	+0.23%
1982	2,537	+0.10%
1990	2,566	+0.14%
1999	2,487	−0.35%
2007	2,511	+0.12%
2012	2,582	+0.56%
2017	2,575	−0.05%
2023	2,403	−1.15%
Source: INSEE

== See also ==
- Communes of the Charente department
