= Saint-Laurent-de-Belzagot =

- Part of Montmoreau
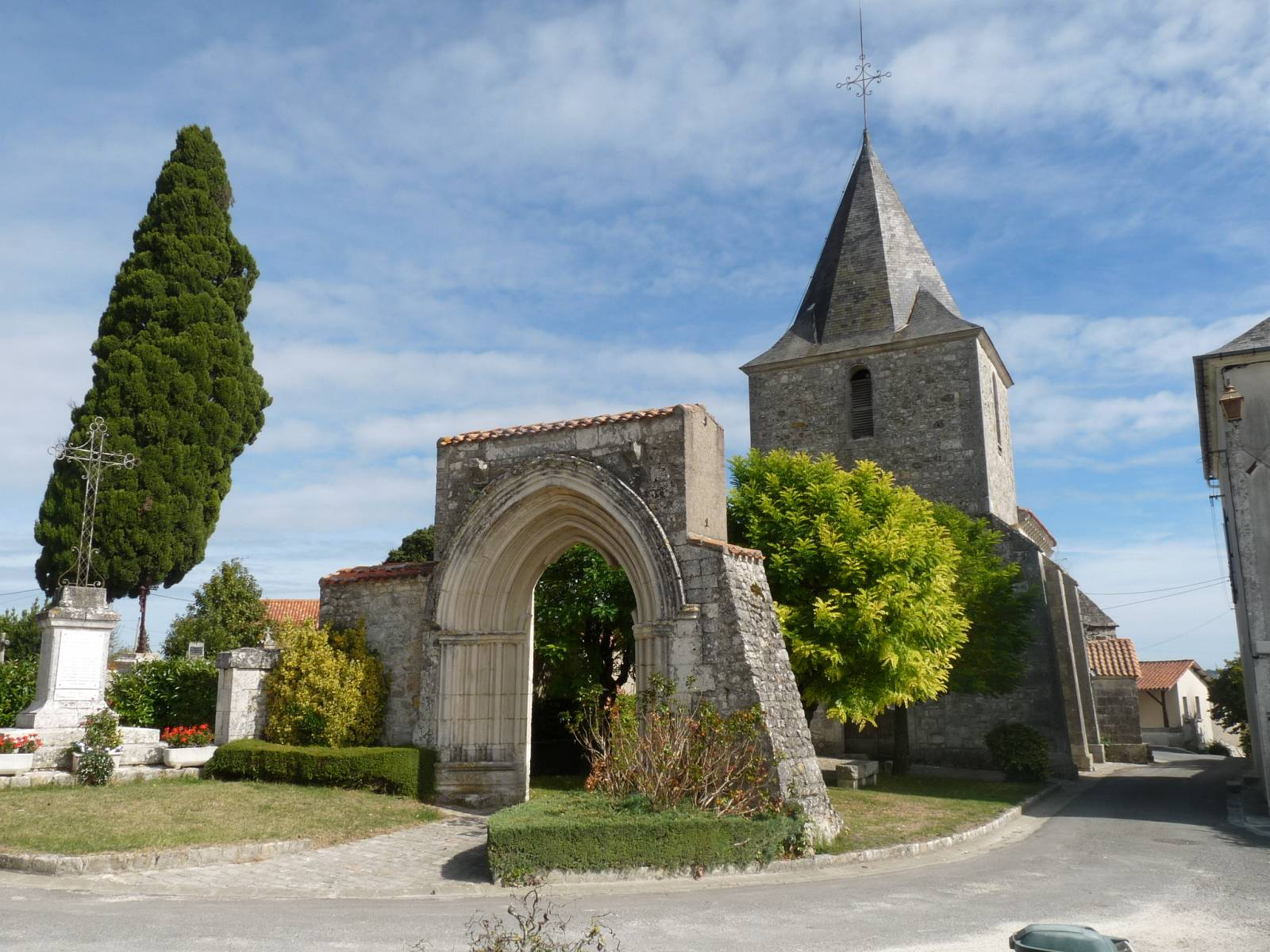
- Location of Saint-Laurent-de-Belzagot
- Location within France Location within Nouvelle-Aquitaine
- Coordinates: 45°23′28″N 0°07′08″E
- Country: France
- Region: Nouvelle-Aquitaine
- Department: Charente
- Arrondissement: Angoulême
- Canton: Tude-et-Lavalette
- Commune: Montmoreau
- Area^{1}: 9.99 km^{2} (3.86 sq mi)
- Elevation: 110 m (360 ft)
- Highest elevation: 172 m (564 ft)
- Lowest elevation: 59 m (194 ft)
- Population (2018): 392
  - Density: 39.2/km^{2} (102/sq mi)
- Time zone: UTC+01:00 (CET)
  - Summer (DST): UTC+02:00 (CEST)
- Postal code: 16190
- ^{1} French Land Register data, which excludes lakes, ponds, glaciers > 1 km^{2} (0.386 sq mi or 247 acres) and river estuaries.

Saint-Laurent-de-Belzagot (French pronunciation: [sɛ̃ loʁɑ̃ də bɛlzaɡo]) is a former commune in the Charente department in southwestern France. On 1 January 2017, it was merged into the new commune Montmoreau.

== Population ==
Historical population

Year	Pop.	±% p.a.
1793	528	—
1821	487	−0.29%
1846	559	+0.55%
1872	459	−0.76%
1901	354	−0.89%
1926	355	+0.01%
1946	333	−0.32%

Year	Pop.	±% p.a.
1962	308	−0.49%
1968	286	−1.23%
1975	289	+0.15%
1982	290	+0.05%
1990	326	+1.47%
1999	351	+0.82%
2018	392	+0.58%

Source: EHESS and INSEE (2018)

== See also ==
- Communes of the Charente department
