= Saint-Eutrope =

- Part of Montmoreau
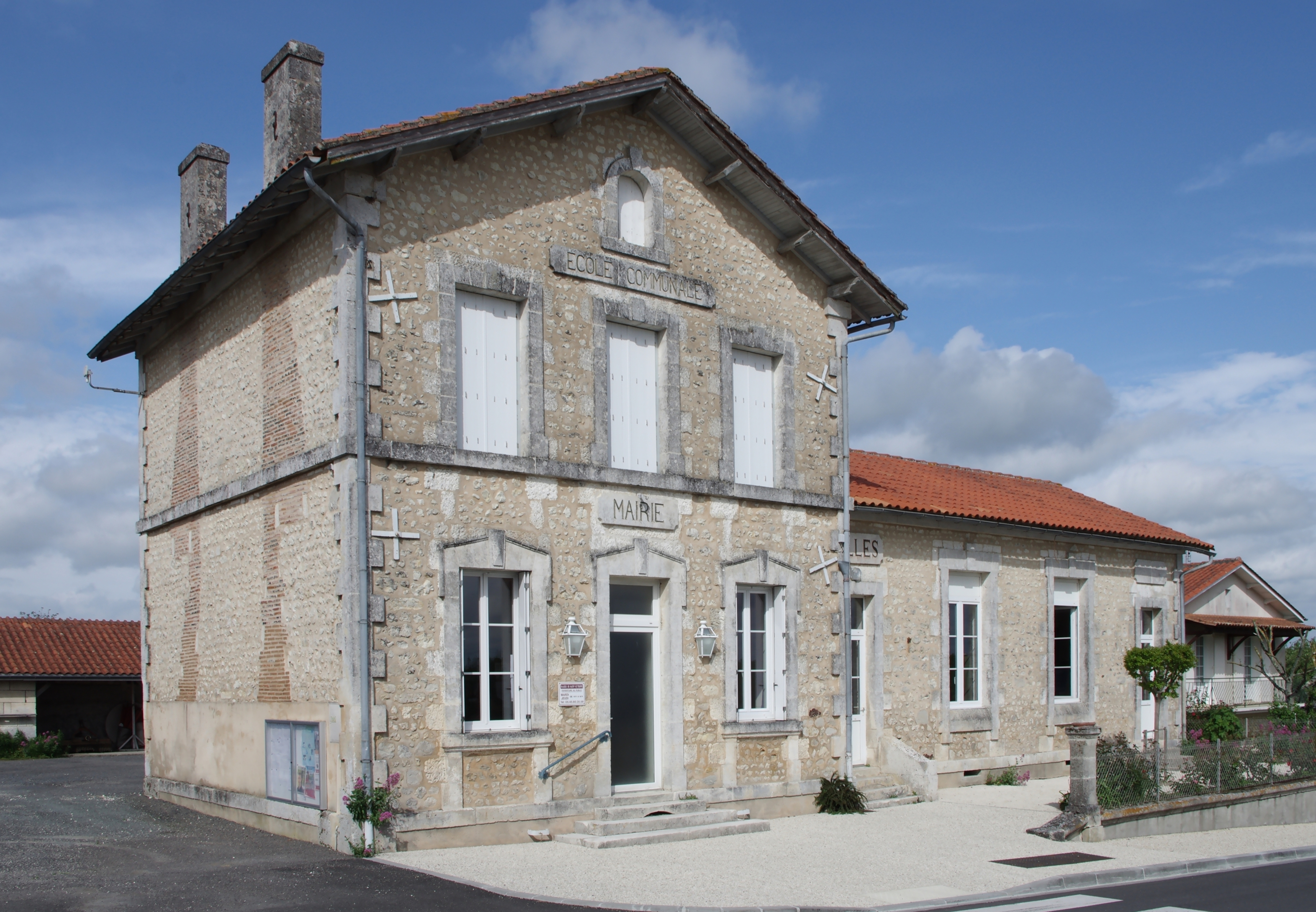
- Town hall
- Location of Saint-Eutrope
- Location within France Location within Nouvelle-Aquitaine
- Coordinates: 45°25′08″N 0°06′44″E
- Country: France
- Region: Nouvelle-Aquitaine
- Department: Charente
- Arrondissement: Angoulême
- Canton: Tude-et-Lavalette
- Commune: Montmoreau
- Area^{1}: 2.67 km^{2} (1.03 sq mi)
- Elevation: 183 m (600 ft)
- Highest elevation: 186 m (610 ft)
- Lowest elevation: 114 m (374 ft)
- Population (2018): 168
  - Density: 62.9/km^{2} (163/sq mi)
- Time zone: UTC+01:00 (CET)
  - Summer (DST): UTC+02:00 (CEST)
- Postal code: 16190
- ^{1} French Land Register data, which excludes lakes, ponds, glaciers > 1 km^{2} (0.386 sq mi or 247 acres) and river estuaries.

Saint-Eutrope (French pronunciation: [sɛ̃.t‿øtʁɔp]) is a former commune in the Charente department in southwestern France. On 1 January 2017, it was merged into the new commune Montmoreau.

== Geography ==
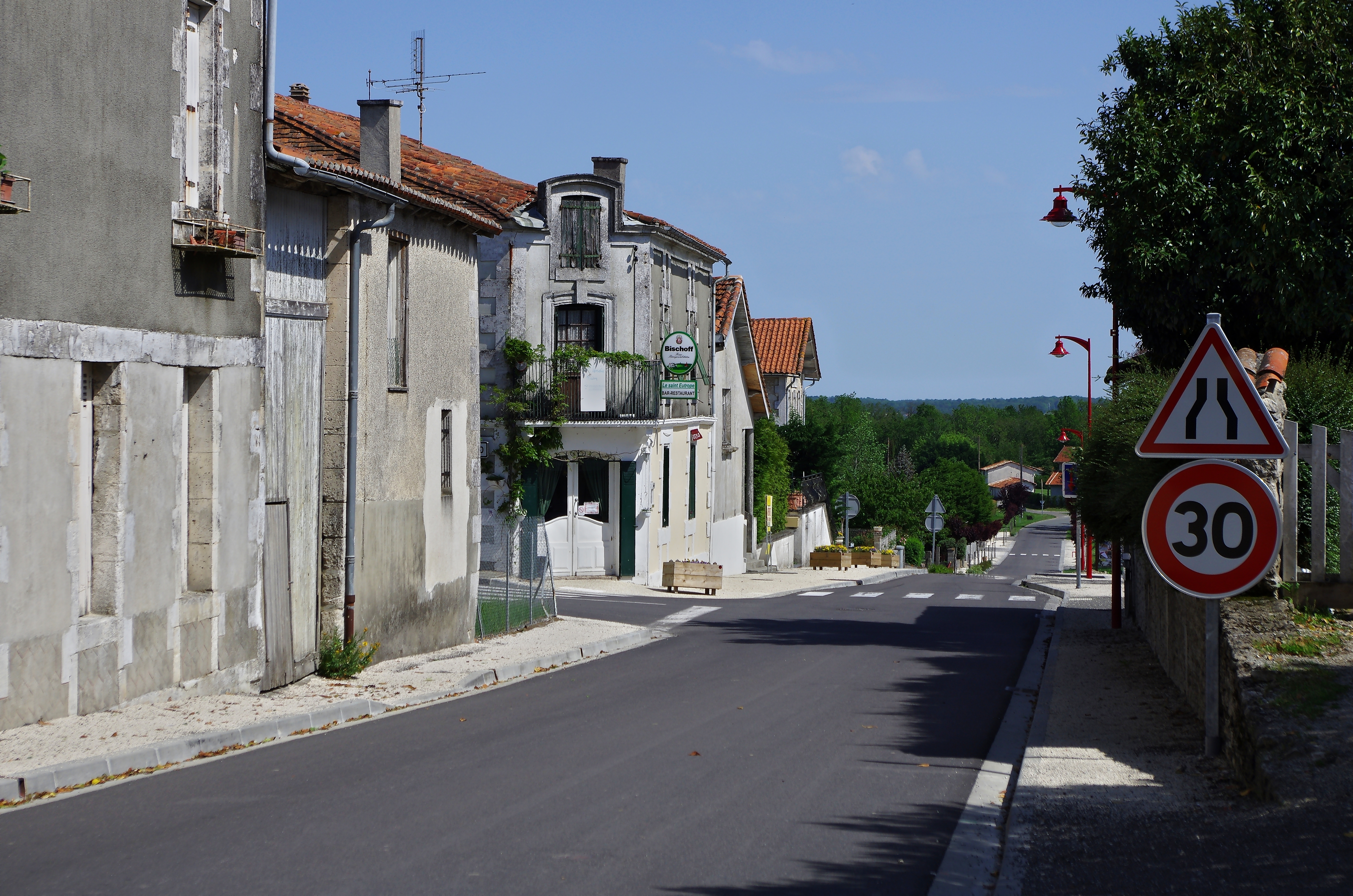
16 Rue principale 2012

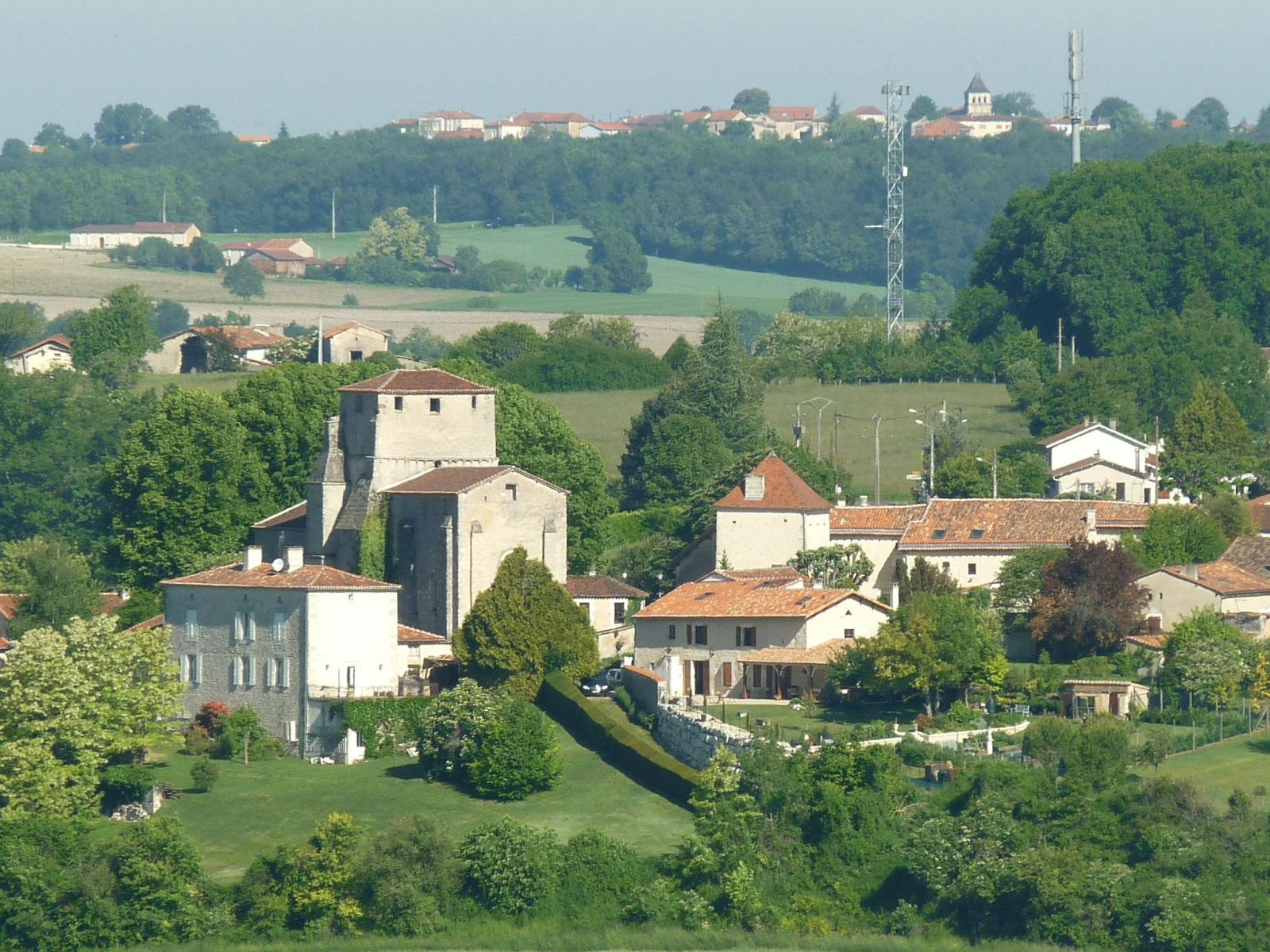
view of St Eutrope

Saint-Eutrope is a common South Charente located 2.5 km northwest of Montmoreau and 26 km south of Angoulême. It is a small town on the surface (less than 3 km2), and lying territory (3.5 km long and 0.5 km wide).

The village is 9 km southeast of Blanzac.

The town is crossed by two county roads. The main one is the D 10, drive to Montmoreau Blanzac and Chateauneuf, which runs through the town staying on the ridge. The other is the D 74 which joins the road to Angoulême Libourne (D 674) by Saint-Cybard and part of the town. It is also the route of Nonac in North Western Canada.2.

The nearest train station is in Montmoreau, served by TER to Angoulême and Bordeaux.

=== Hamlets and localities ===
The village is quite large, and the town hamlets are small and are only farms: Bel-Air, Large Stones, Maine Blanchard, in Calais, Perry. Chabreville Castle, not far from the town, is in the municipality of Courgeac.

=== Geology ===
The ground is limestone Cretaceous (chalk), but the peaks are covered with sand and clay tertiary deposit, and wood (or heath) have chestnuts and pines, calcifuges species.

The clay of the ground meant that Saint-Eutrope was a renowned place of manufacture of solid pottery until the 20th century, there was also an iron mine

== History ==
In the early sixteenth century, St. Eutrope de la Lande was a priory. A Romanesque church dates from the twelfth century.

St. Eutropius was in the manor of Montmoreau dependent Angoumois, and following the religious wars, Francis has installed persecuted Catholic families, as well as Saint-Laurent-de-Belzagot.

Saint-Eutrope has long been famous for its pottery. In the eighteenth century, no fewer than 30 families working there, with 25 fours. Saint-Eutrope specialized in the manufacture of large pieces: mass graves, Ponnes and flagons, as well as "faience pebbles" yellow glaze characteristics of certain workshops in the locality. This craft has reached its peak in 1841 with 140 potters. After the 1914–18 war, they were only a dizaine.

The clay was then briefly operated as a building material (brickworks in Bel-Air, adopted in 1986).

== Name ==
The first mention of the place appears in 1523: Sanctus Eutropius of Landa. Saint Eutrope was the first bishop of Saintes, and his relics were the subject of pilgrimages in the Middle age.

During the French Revolution, Saint-Eutrope was called La Poterie, and Utrope.

== Dialects ==
Although the dialectal limit is 10 km to the east, the town also has the distinction of being a small enclave Occitan (Limousin dialect) language of oïl.

== Population ==
Historical population

Year	Pop.	±% p.a.
1793	282	—
1800	228	−2.99%
1806	274	+3.11%
1821	279	+0.12%
1831	297	+0.63%
1841	292	−0.17%
1846	306	+0.94%
1851	306	+0.00%
1856	258	−3.35%
1861	262	+0.31%
1866	242	−1.58%
1872	201	−3.05%
1876	194	−0.88%
1881	196	+0.21%
1886	200	+0.40%
1891	210	+0.98%
1896	202	−0.77%

Year	Pop.	±% p.a.
1901	195	−0.70%
1906	202	+0.71%
1911	192	−1.01%
1921	174	−0.98%
1926	187	+1.45%
1931	159	−3.19%
1936	146	−1.69%
1946	142	−0.28%
1954	173	+2.50%
1962	157	−1.21%
1968	137	−2.25%
1975	164	+2.60%
1982	164	+0.00%
1990	192	+1.99%
1999	169	−1.41%
2007	157	−0.92%
2012	179	+2.66%

Source: EHESS and INSEE (2007–2012)

== See also ==
- Communes of the Charente department
