= Montmoreau-Saint-Cybard =

- Part of Montmoreau
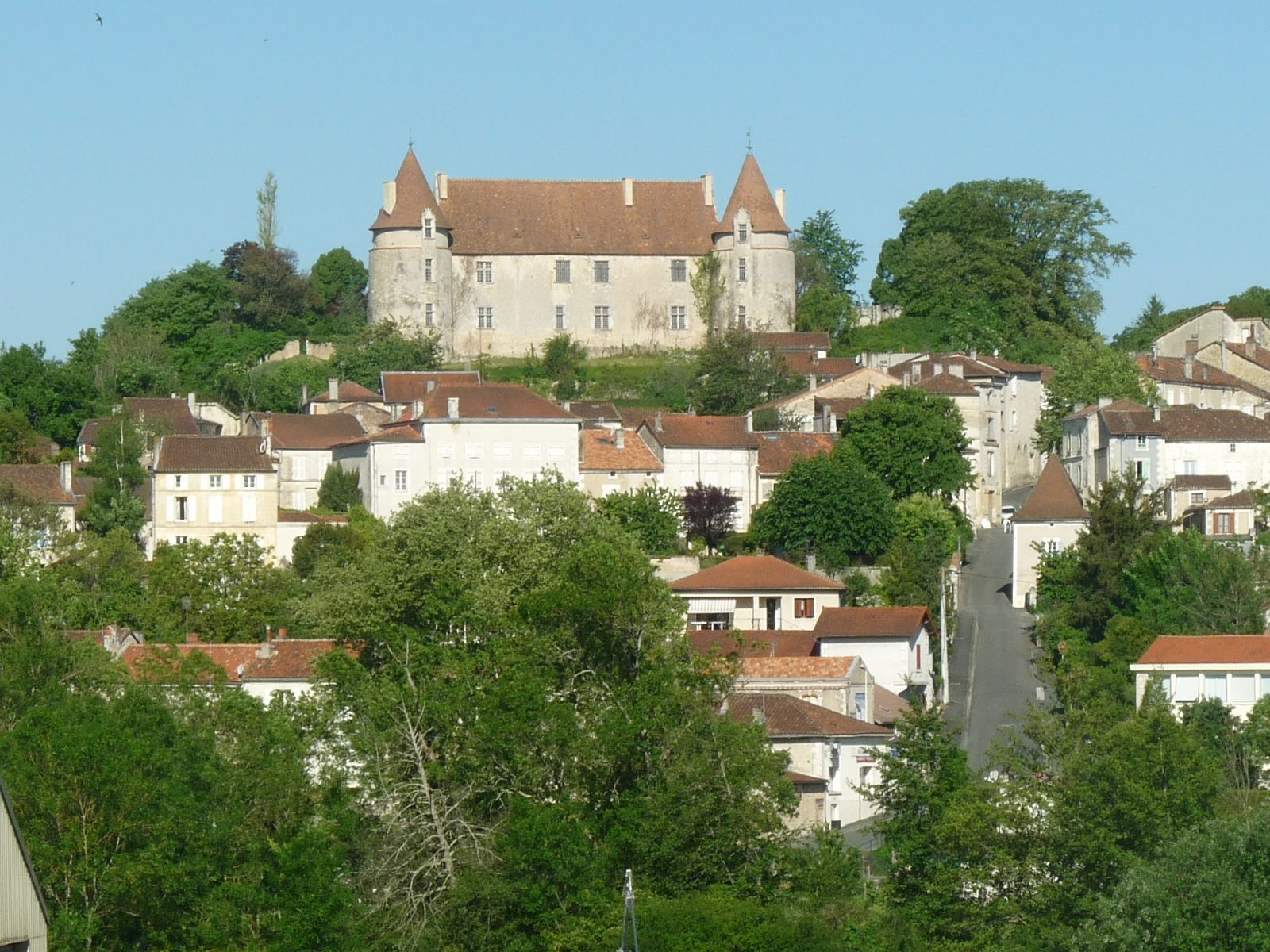

- Coat of arms
- Location of Montmoreau-Saint-Cybard
- Location within France Location within Nouvelle-Aquitaine
- Coordinates: 45°24′00″N 0°07′54″E
- Country: France
- Region: Nouvelle-Aquitaine
- Department: Charente
- Arrondissement: Angoulême
- Canton: Tude-et-Lavalette
- Commune: Montmoreau
- Area^{1}: 12.00 km^{2} (4.63 sq mi)
- Elevation: 82 m (269 ft)
- Highest elevation: 182 m (597 ft)
- Lowest elevation: 71 m (233 ft)
- Population (2018): 1,082
  - Density: 90.17/km^{2} (233.5/sq mi)
- Time zone: UTC+01:00 (CET)
  - Summer (DST): UTC+02:00 (CEST)
- Postal code: 16190
- ^{1} French Land Register data, which excludes lakes, ponds, glaciers > 1 km^{2} (0.386 sq mi or 247 acres) and river estuaries.

Montmoreau-Saint-Cybard (French pronunciation: [mɔ̃mɔʁo sɛ̃ sibaʁ]) is a former commune in the Charente department in southwestern France. It was created in 1966 by the merger of the former communes Montmoreau and Saint-Cybard. On 1 January 2017, it was merged into the new commune Montmoreau.

The town is overlooked by a castle that dates from the Middle Ages, and a chapel within its gardens is classified as a historic monument. While its walls date from the eleventh century, the castle was destroyed during the Hundred Years War. Today only a large gate remains of the original; the current castle was built in the 15th century in the form of a manor within the old walls. The Church of Saint-Denis, which was restored starting in the 19th century, dates from the 12th.

== Population ==
Historical population
Year	Pop.	±% p.a.
1968	1,099	—
1975	1,177	+0.98%
1982	1,179	+0.02%
1990	1,120	−0.64%
1999	1,052	−0.69%
2006	1,060	+0.11%
2018	1,082	+0.17%
Source: EHESS and INSEE (2018)

== See also ==
- Communes of the Charente department
