= La Gonterie-Boulouneix =

- Part of Brantôme en Périgord
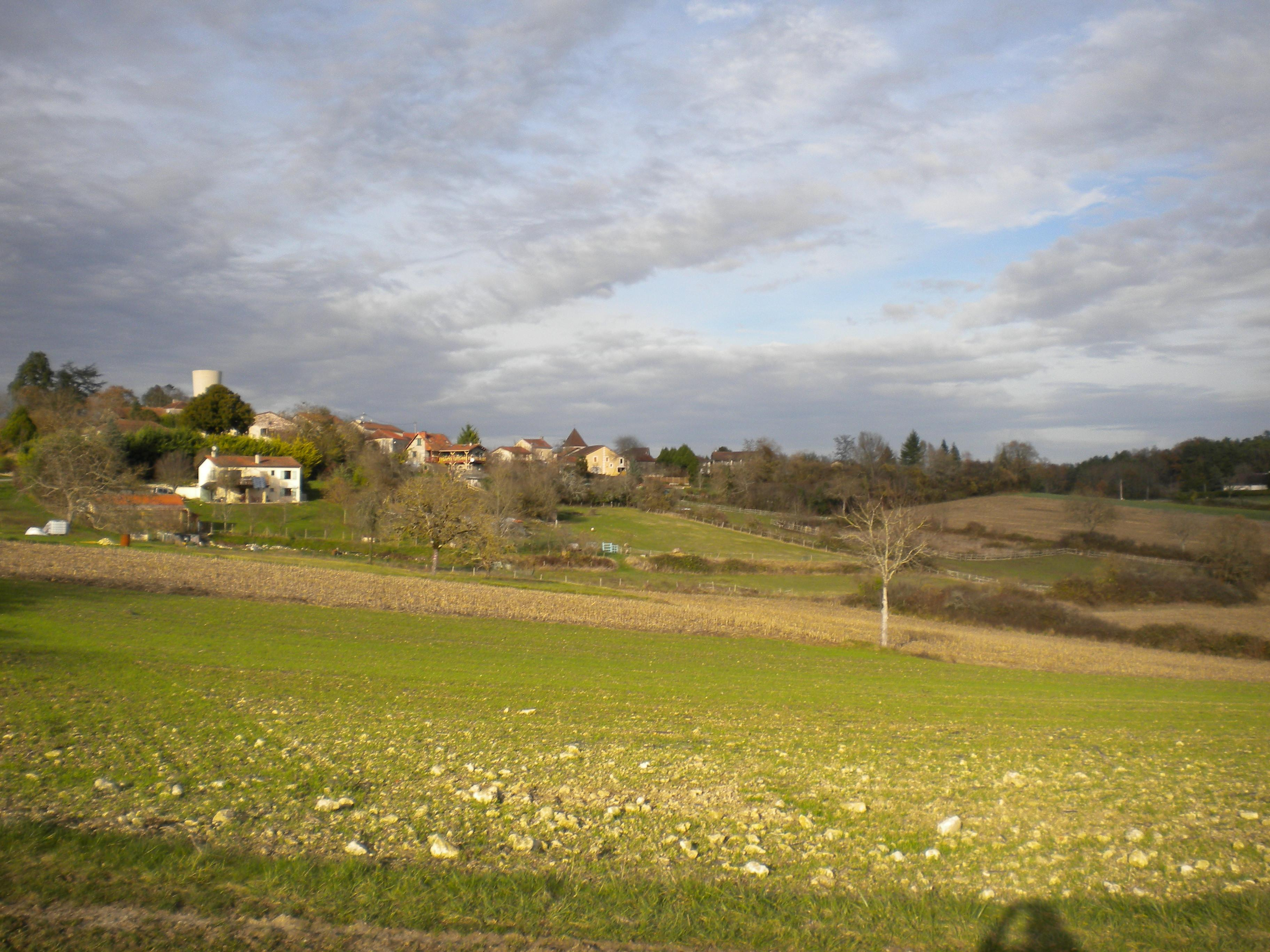
- Location of La Gonterie-Boulouneix
- Location within France Location within Nouvelle-Aquitaine
- Coordinates: 45°23′19″N 0°35′23″E
- Country: France
- Region: Nouvelle-Aquitaine
- Department: Dordogne
- Arrondissement: Nontron
- Canton: Brantôme
- Commune: Brantôme en Périgord
- Area^{1}: 11.79 km^{2} (4.55 sq mi)
- Elevation: 194 m (636 ft)
- Highest elevation: 202 m (663 ft)
- Lowest elevation: 105 m (344 ft)
- Population (2023): 229
  - Density: 19.4/km^{2} (50.3/sq mi)
- Time zone: UTC+01:00 (CET)
  - Summer (DST): UTC+02:00 (CEST)
- Postal code: 24310
- ^{1} French Land Register data, which excludes lakes, ponds, glaciers > 1 km^{2} (0.386 sq mi or 247 acres) and river estuaries.

La Gonterie-Boulouneix (French pronunciation: [la ɡɔ̃tʁi bulunɛ]; Occitan: La Gontariá e Bolonés) is a former commune in the Dordogne department in Nouvelle-Aquitaine in southwestern France. On 1 January 2019, it was merged into the commune Brantôme en Périgord.

== Etymology ==
The commune is an amalgamation of the once independent communes La Gonterie and Boulouneix. La Gonterie refers to Gontier, a well-known patronym in the area. Boulouneix is derived from the Latin adjective Bolonensis - i.e. pertaining to the river Bolon (in Occitan) or Boulou.

== Geography ==
The modern commune of La Gonterie-Boulouneix consists of the three historic communes Belaygue, Boulouneix and La Gonterie associated with hamlets and isolated dwellings like Champat, Champébre, Champtonie, Chazeau, Chez Jaumelet, Garelias, L'Étang, La Chataignade, La Combardie, La Nègrerie, La Plagne, La Suchonie, La Sudrie or Les Sudries, La Tabaterie, Landrivie, Le(s) Bernard(s), Le Clos du Pont, Le Couderc or Le Coudert, Le Haut-Palange, Le Maine, Leforesterie, Les Boutétias, Les Marquisats, Maison-neuve, Malet, Moulin de la Faye and Palange.

The commune's area is traversed in a NE-SW direction by the Boulou and its left tributary Le Belaygue. Several times the Boulou traces the northwestern boundary of the commune. The Belaygue enters the commune's territory from the northeast, flows past the villages of Belaygue and Boulouneix and merges in the far southwest with the Boulou.

La Gonterie-Boulouneix is surrounded by the following communes:

- Saint-Félix-de-Bourdeilles in the north.
- Saint-Crépin-de-Richemont in the northeast.
- Brantôme in the east and the southeast.
- Saint-Julien-de-Bourdeilles in the south.
- Paussac-et-Saint-Vivien in the southwest.
- Leguillac-de-Cercles in the west and the northwest.

The village of La Gonterie is situated 5 kilometers northwest of Brantôme and 17 kilometers south-southwest of Nontron.

No major through road crosses the commune's territory. The communal road C 1 connects La Gonterie to the D 939, a major trunk road from Périgueux to Angoulême about two kilometers farther to the northeast.

Orographically the commune's lowest point is situated at the confluence of the Belaygue and the Boulou 105 meters above sea level. The highest elevation reaches 202 meters near Champat in the northeast.

The commune borders the Parc naturel régional Périgord Limousin.

== Geology ==
The communal territory is mainly underlain by flat-lying Cretaceous limestones, the vast majority being Coniacian limestones. Near Marquisat in the north appear Upper Turonian limestones of the Angoumian facies. The higher elevations around La Gonterie are taken up by Lower Santonian limestones. In the Boulou valley the Coniacian is a cliff former with abris and caves (cave of la Sudrie, abris near La Nègrerie and La Tabaterie). Between Marquisat and Belaygue a major fault zone crosses in a NW-SE direction. This fault zone is a prolongation of the Mareuil anticline. In some high places the Cretaceous sediments are covered by alluvial and colluvial deposits of the Pleistocene, mainly sands, gravels and clays.

== History ==
The presence of hominids can be traced back in La Gonterie-Boulouneix to the Paleolithic. Lithic artefacts from the Mousterian have been discovered in the abris of Sendouge (also Sandougne) and La Tabaterie in the southwest. A partially fortified hillfort (an oppidum taking up 13.5 hectares) was established during the second Iron Age about 600 to 500 BC on Roc Plat 20 to 30 meters above the abris at Sendouge. The Romans left some remnants of an aqueduct (masonry) in the ancient graveyard of Boulouneix. The Romanesque church in Saintonge style of Boulouneix dates back to the 12th century. In ancient days Boulouneix used to house a convent dependent on Brantôme and a village logically called Labayat. At about the same the Benedictines founded a (now ruined) priory for nuns in Belaygue. The church in La Gonterie dates back to the 18th century. In the year 1806 the communes of Belaygue and Boulouneix were united. The modern name of La Gonterie-Boulouneix exists since 1912.

== See also ==
- Communes of the Dordogne department
