= La Chapelle-Faucher =

- Commune
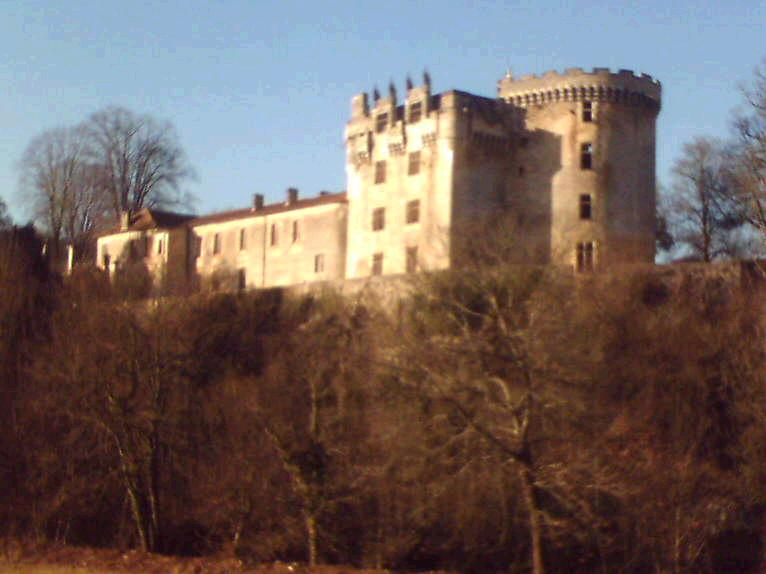
- Château de La Chapelle-Faucher
- Location of La Chapelle-Faucher
- Location within France Location within Nouvelle-Aquitaine
- Coordinates: 45°22′18″N 0°45′10″E
- Country: France
- Region: Nouvelle-Aquitaine
- Department: Dordogne
- Arrondissement: Nontron
- Canton: Brantôme en Périgord
- Intercommunality: Dronne et Belle

Government
  - Mayor (2020–2026): Sylviane Née
- Area^{1}: 18.4 km^{2} (7.1 sq mi)
- Elevation: 144 m (472 ft)
- Highest elevation: 213 m (699 ft)
- Lowest elevation: 114 m (374 ft)
- Population (2023): 395
  - Density: 21.5/km^{2} (55.6/sq mi)
- Time zone: UTC+01:00 (CET)
  - Summer (DST): UTC+02:00 (CEST)
- INSEE/Postal code: 24107 /24530
- ^{1} French Land Register data, which excludes lakes, ponds, glaciers > 1 km^{2} (0.386 sq mi or 247 acres) and river estuaries.

La Chapelle-Faucher (French pronunciation: [la ʃapɛl foʃe]; Occitan: La Chapela Fauchier) is a commune in the Dordogne department in Nouvelle-Aquitaine in southwestern France.

This small but quaint rural French village has a Romanesque-style church, Notre Dame de l'Assomption built in the 12th century, a rambling ancient chateau overlooking the Cole River built in the 13th century (some of which has been restored and used for wedding receptions and other events), a kindergarten and a town hall. La Chapelle-Faucher is set above the river Côle, a tributary of the Dronne river which runs through the nearby town of Brantôme.

== History ==
In the 14th century, the entire town was burnt to the ground during the Hundred Years' War. The village was gradually rebuilt, but religion's powerful hand frequented the village. On 2 July 1569, Protestants led by Gaspard de Coligny, rounded up 260 Catholic peasants (men, women and children), put into the chateau and brutally killed one by one during the wars of religion. The local priest pleaded that they be saved but to no avail. According to the local chronicler of these wars at the time, Pierre de Bourdeille, seigneur (and abbé) de Brantôme, the killings began at 9 am and finished around 2 pm. Some residents say you can hear the voices of distressed peasants in the darkness of the night...

== Population ==
Historical population
Year	Pop.	±% p.a.
1968	477	—
1975	478	+0.03%
1982	445	−1.02%
1990	398	−1.39%
1999	399	+0.03%
2007	377	−0.71%
2012	403	+1.34%
2017	414	+0.54%
2023	395	−0.78%
Source: INSEE

== See also ==
- Communes of the Dordogne department
