= Saint-Pierre-de-Côle =

- Commune
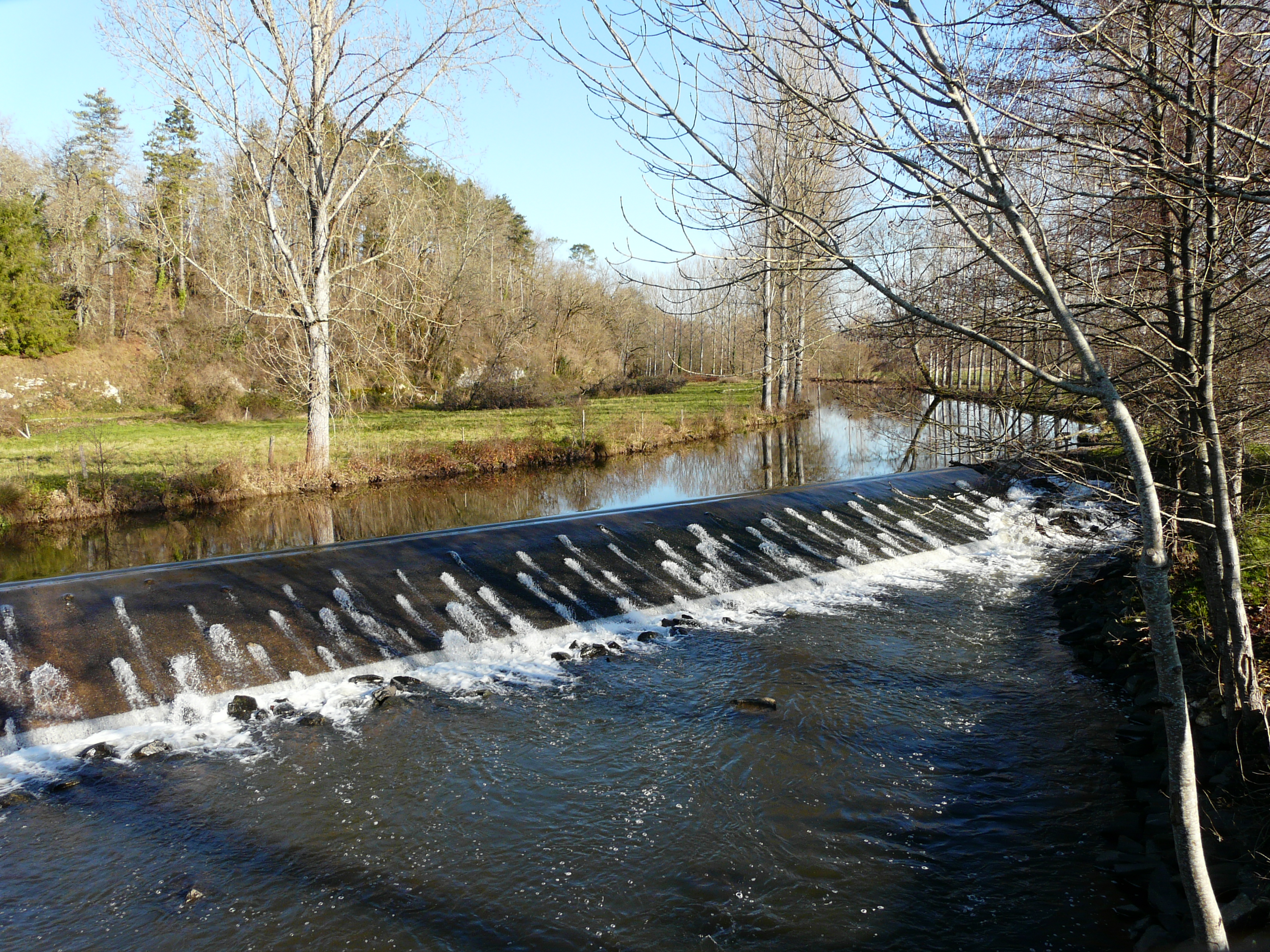
- Côle River
- Location of Saint-Pierre-de-Côle
- Location within France Location within Nouvelle-Aquitaine
- Coordinates: 45°22′20″N 0°47′36″E
- Country: France
- Region: Nouvelle-Aquitaine
- Department: Dordogne
- Arrondissement: Nontron
- Canton: Thiviers

Government
  - Mayor (2020–2026): Franck Besse
- Area^{1}: 19.85 km^{2} (7.66 sq mi)
- Elevation: 130 m (430 ft)
- Highest elevation: 237 m (778 ft)
- Lowest elevation: 119 m (390 ft)
- Population (2023): 432
  - Density: 21.8/km^{2} (56.4/sq mi)
- Time zone: UTC+01:00 (CET)
  - Summer (DST): UTC+02:00 (CEST)
- INSEE/Postal code: 24485 /24800
- ^{1} French Land Register data, which excludes lakes, ponds, glaciers > 1 km^{2} (0.386 sq mi or 247 acres) and river estuaries.

Saint-Pierre-de-Côle (French pronunciation: [sɛ̃ pjɛʁ də kol], literally Saint-Pierre of Côle; Limousin: Sent Peir de Còla) is a commune in the Dordogne department in Nouvelle-Aquitaine in southwestern France.

== Geography ==
The river Côle flows southwestward through the middle of the commune, crosses the village and forms part of the commune's south-western border. The village straddles the D 78 road from Brantôme to Saint-Jean-de-Côle. At the centre of the village is the village square with an ancient Romanesque church which has been heavily restored and the cafe/restaurant 'La Marmite'. There is also a post office and a bakery in the village.

The village festival takes place on the first weekend in August, and there are fireworks on the river.

== Population ==
Historical population
Year	Pop.	±% p.a.
1968	539	—
1975	507	−0.87%
1982	490	−0.49%
1990	464	−0.68%
1999	448	−0.39%
2007	445	−0.08%
2012	478	+1.44%
2017	430	−2.09%
2023	432	+0.08%
Source: INSEE

== See also ==
- Communes of the Dordogne department
