= Brantôme =

Brantôme may refer to:

- Brantôme, Dordogne, a commune in the Dordogne département in central France
- Pierre de Bourdeille, seigneur de Brantôme (1540–1614), French soldier and historian
- Brantôme (horse) (1931–1952), champion French racehorse
