= Château de Bruzac =

Ruined castle in Nouvelle-Aquitaine, France

Coordinates: 45°22′55″N 0°48′11″E

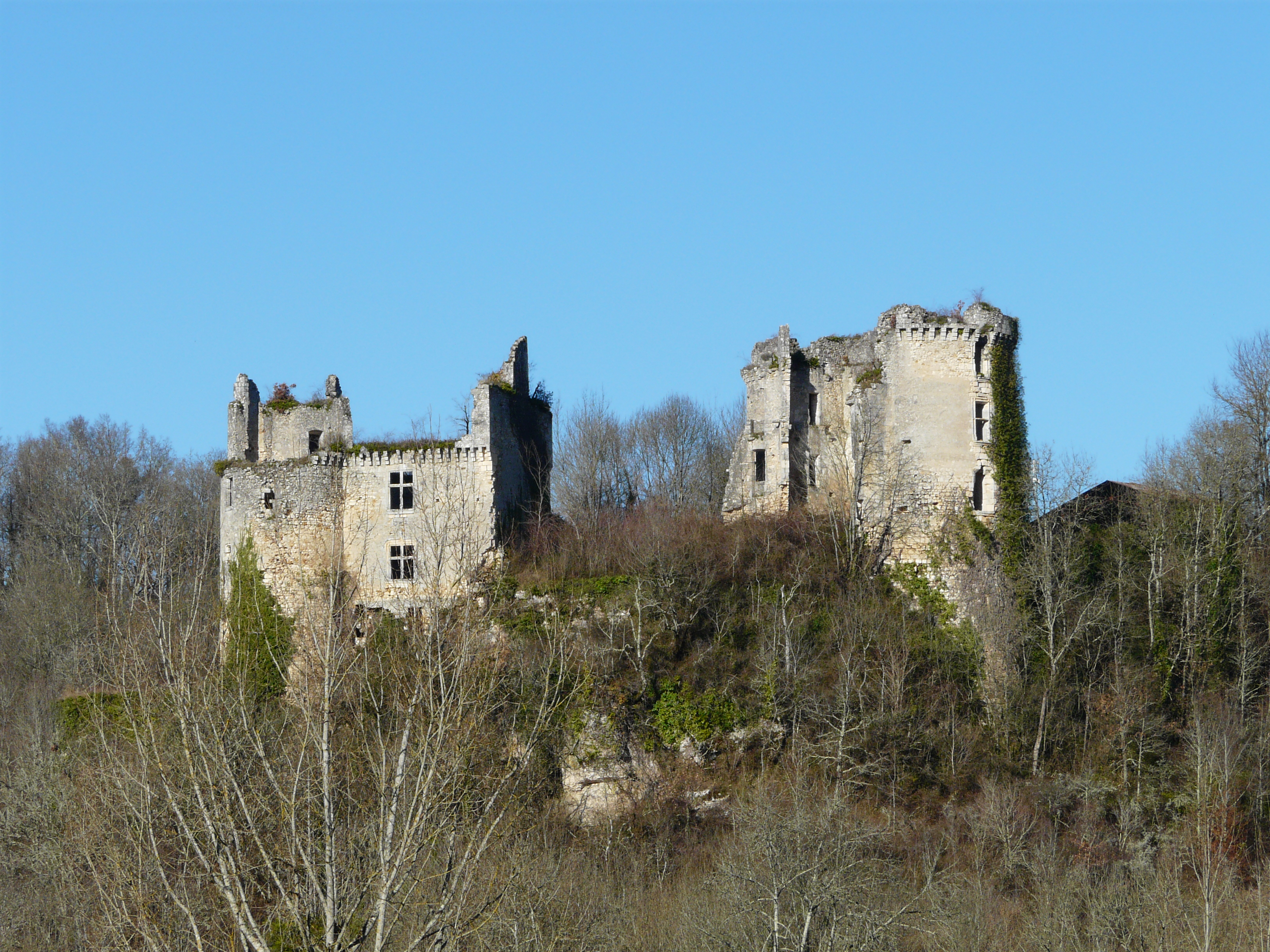

Château de Bruzac is a ruined castle in Saint-Pierre-de-Côle, Dordogne, Nouvelle-Aquitaine, France.
