= Château de Saint-Crépin (Saint-Crépin-de-Richemont) =

Château in Nouvelle-Aquitaine, France

Coordinates: 45°25′08″N 0°35′59″E

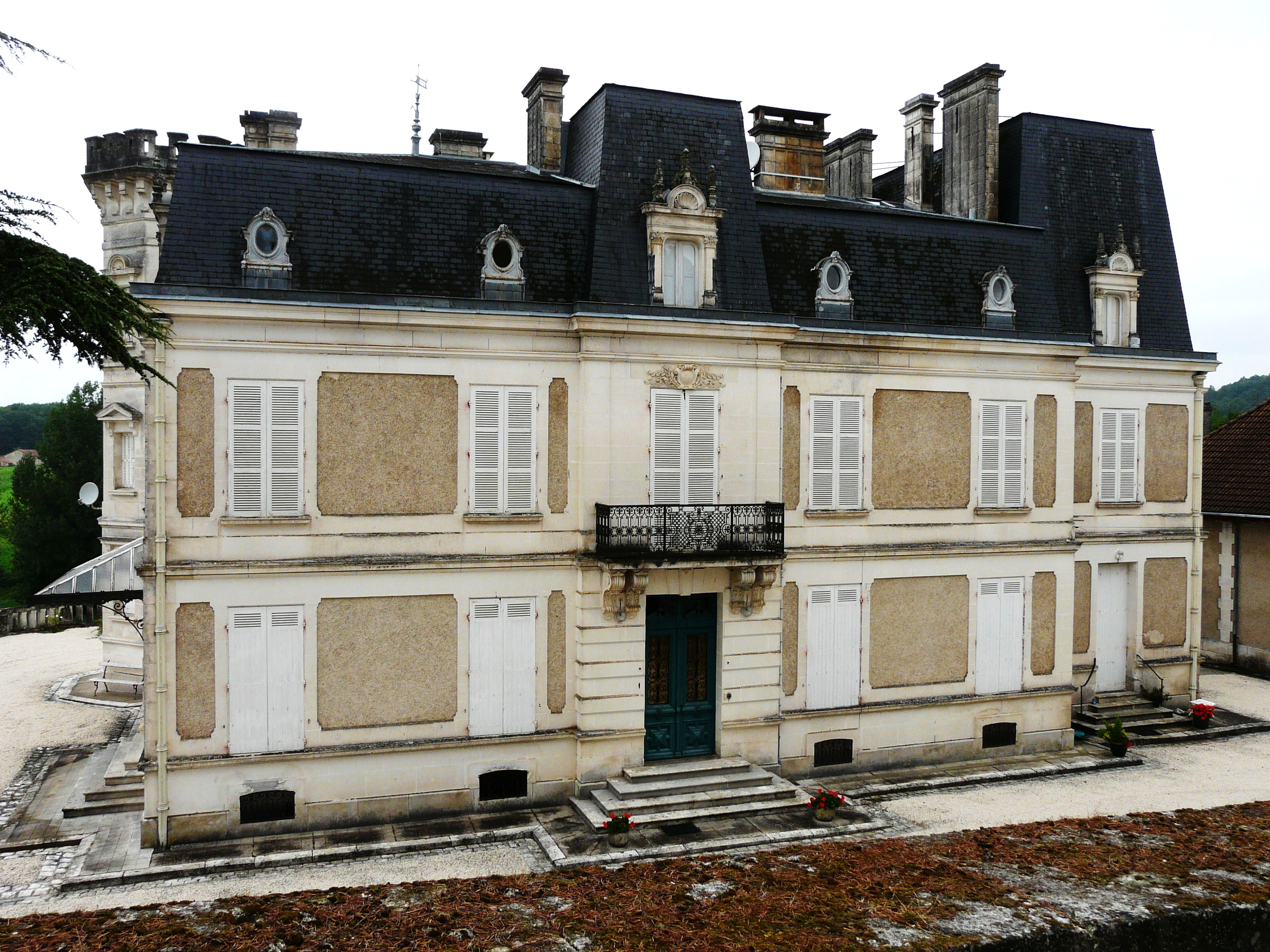
Château de Saint-Crépin

The Château de Saint-Crépin is a château in Saint-Crépin-de-Richemont, Dordogne, Nouvelle-Aquitaine, France. It was built in 1891.
