= Firbeix =

- Commune
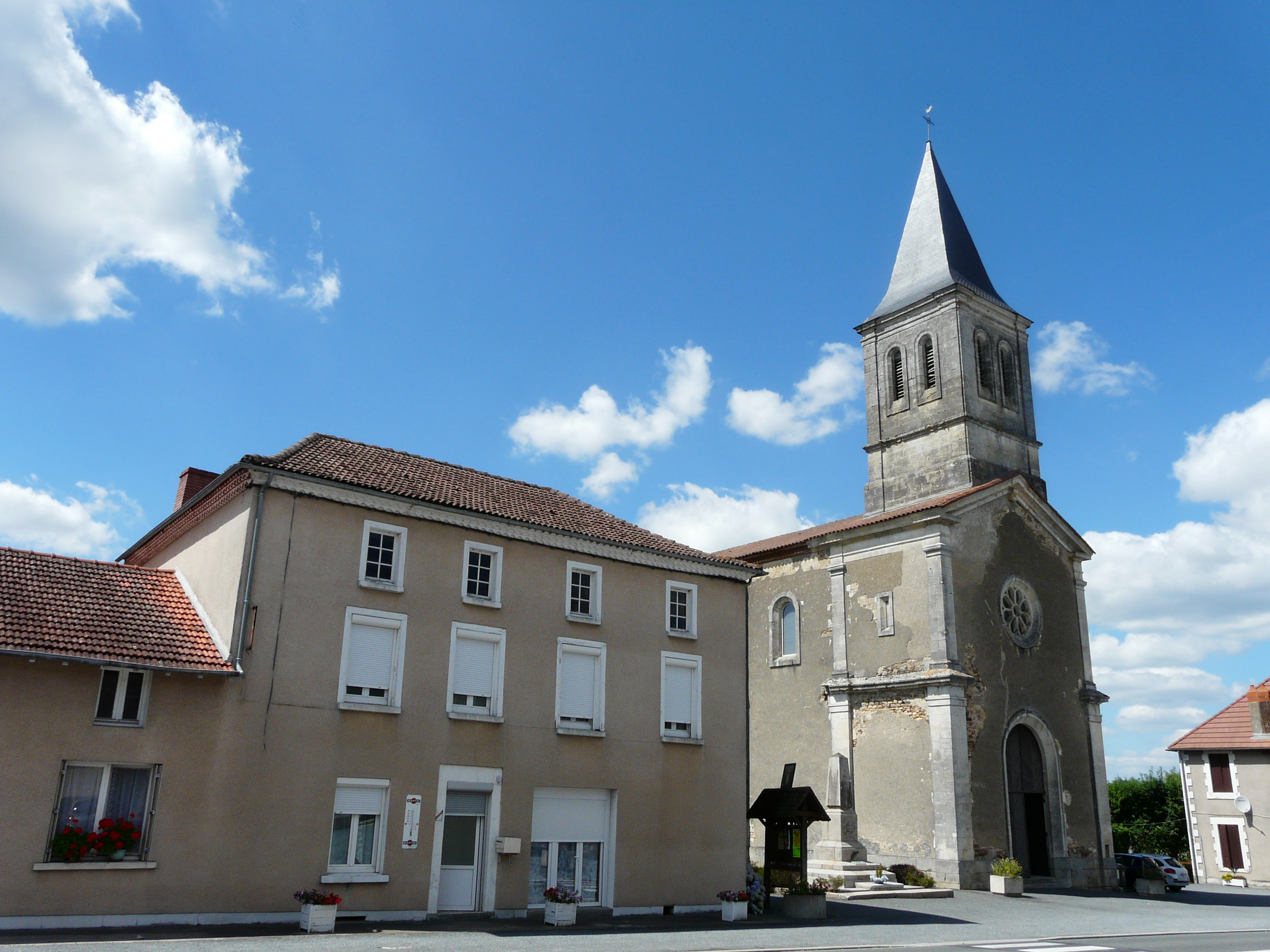
- The church in Firbeix
- Location of Firbeix
- Location within France Location within Nouvelle-Aquitaine
- Coordinates: 45°36′01″N 0°58′33″E
- Country: France
- Region: Nouvelle-Aquitaine
- Department: Dordogne
- Arrondissement: Nontron
- Canton: Thiviers

Government
  - Mayor (2020–2026): Philippe Francois
- Area^{1}: 22.66 km^{2} (8.75 sq mi)
- Elevation: 360 m (1,180 ft)
- Highest elevation: 451 m (1,480 ft)
- Lowest elevation: 290 m (950 ft)
- Population (2023): 294
  - Density: 13.0/km^{2} (33.6/sq mi)
- Time zone: UTC+01:00 (CET)
  - Summer (DST): UTC+02:00 (CEST)
- INSEE/Postal code: 24180 /24450
- ^{1} French Land Register data, which excludes lakes, ponds, glaciers > 1 km^{2} (0.386 sq mi or 247 acres) and river estuaries.

Firbeix is a commune in the Dordogne department in Nouvelle-Aquitaine in southwestern France.

== Geography ==
The Côle has its source near le Châtenet, a hamlet in the southern part of the commune; it forms part of the commune's southeastern border.

== Population ==
Historical population
Year	Pop.	±% p.a.
1968	510	—
1975	448	−1.83%
1982	401	−1.57%
1990	364	−1.20%
1999	326	−1.22%
2007	330	+0.15%
2012	286	−2.82%
2017	307	+1.43%
2023	294	−0.72%
Source: INSEE

== See also ==
- Communes of the Dordogne department
