= Sencenac-Puy-de-Fourches =

- Part of Brantôme en Périgord
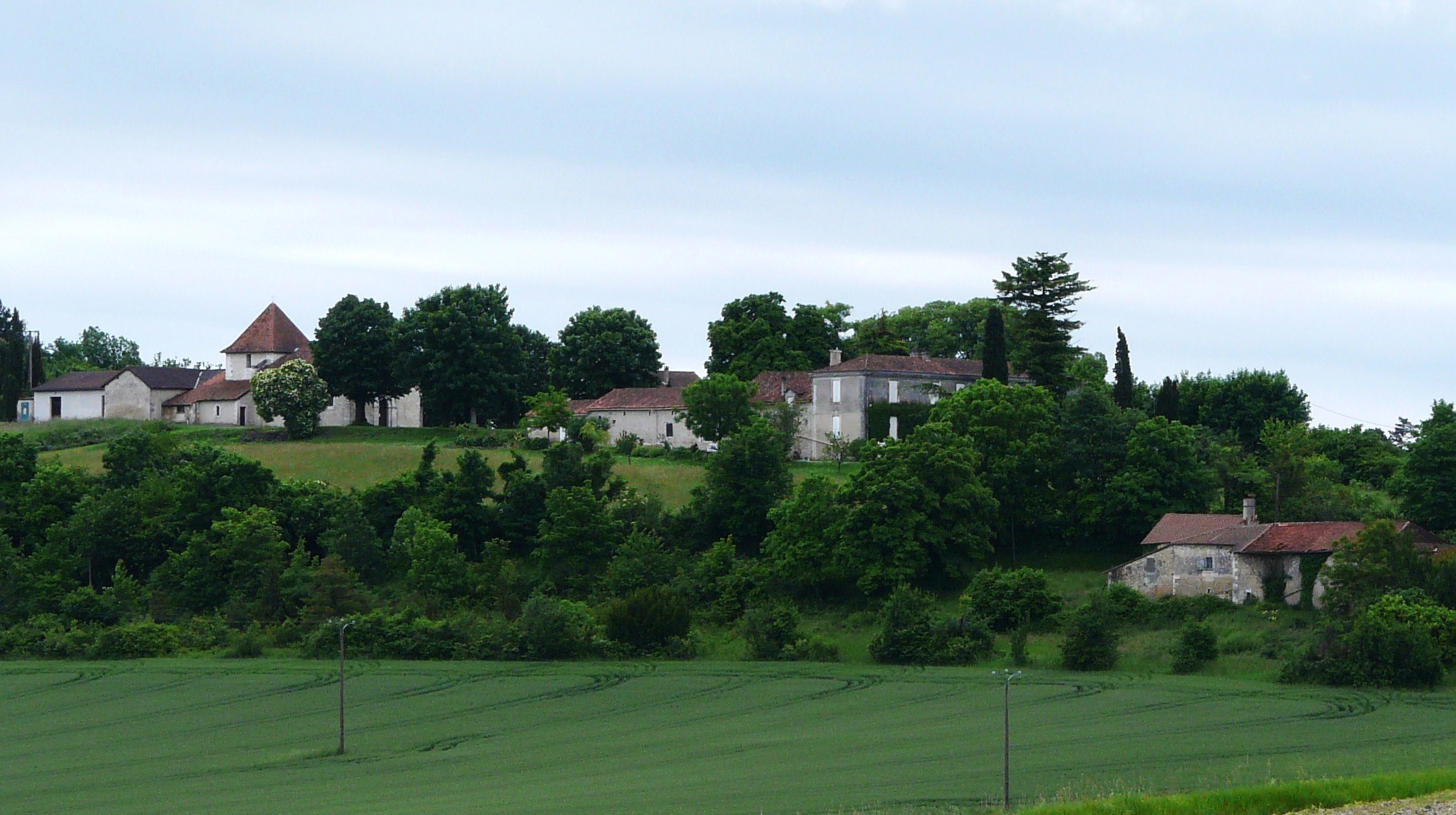
- Puy-de-Fourches
- Location of Sencenac-Puy-de-Fourches
- Location within France Location within Nouvelle-Aquitaine
- Coordinates: 45°18′28″N 0°39′38″E
- Country: France
- Region: Nouvelle-Aquitaine
- Department: Dordogne
- Arrondissement: Nontron
- Canton: Brantôme
- Commune: Brantôme en Périgord
- Area^{1}: 10.79 km^{2} (4.17 sq mi)
- Highest elevation: 234 m (768 ft)
- Lowest elevation: 128 m (420 ft)
- Population (2023): 277
  - Density: 25.7/km^{2} (66.5/sq mi)
- Time zone: UTC+01:00 (CET)
  - Summer (DST): UTC+02:00 (CEST)
- Postal code: 24310
- ^{1} French Land Register data, which excludes lakes, ponds, glaciers > 1 km^{2} (0.386 sq mi or 247 acres) and river estuaries.

Sencenac-Puy-de-Fourches (French pronunciation: [sɑ̃snak pɥi də fuʁʃ]; Occitan: Cencenac e Puei de Forchas) is a former commune in the Dordogne department in Nouvelle-Aquitaine in southwestern France. On 1 January 2019, it was merged into the commune Brantôme en Périgord.

== See also ==
- Communes of the Dordogne département
