= Côle =

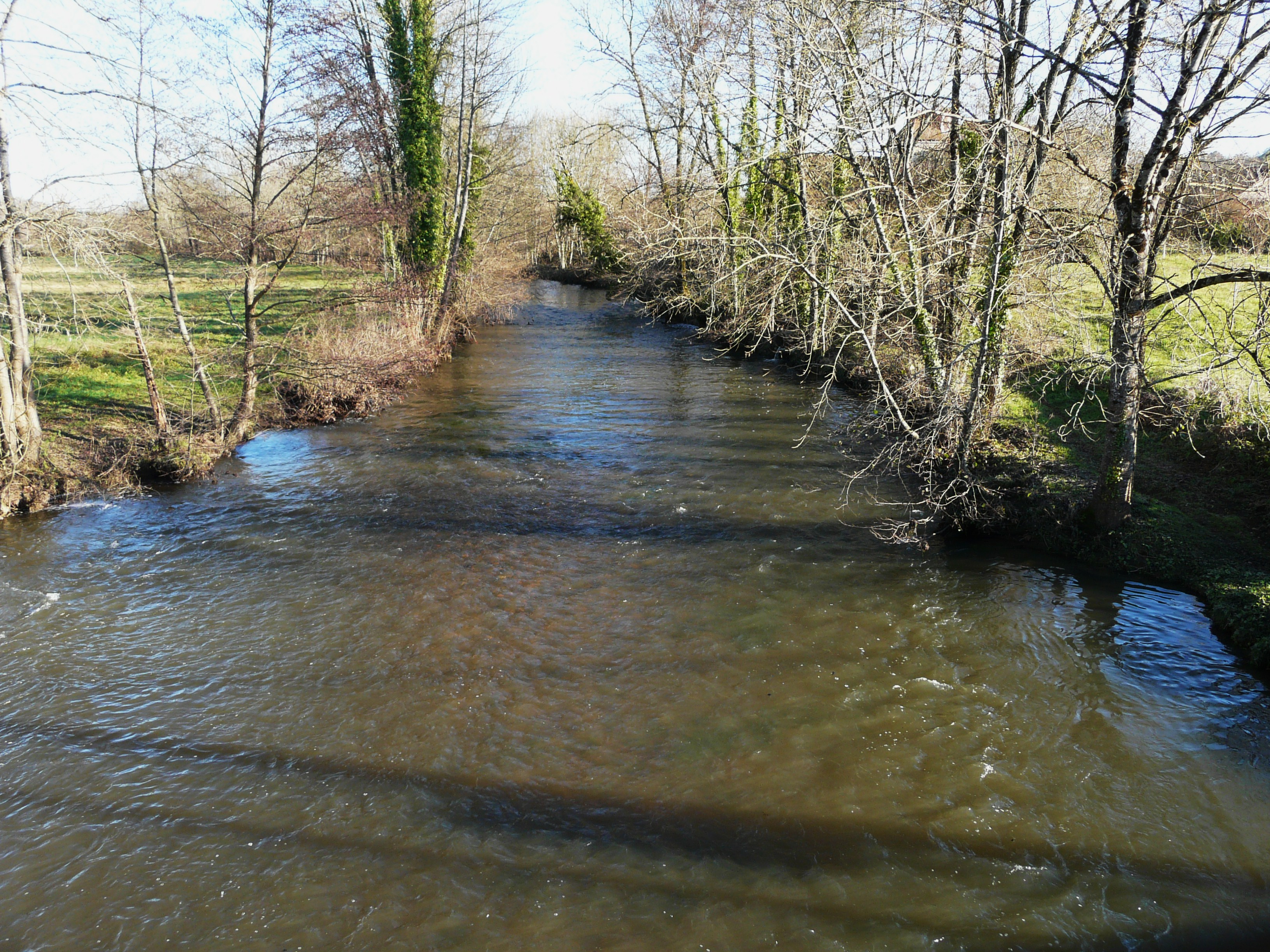
- The Côle at Condat-sur-Trincou

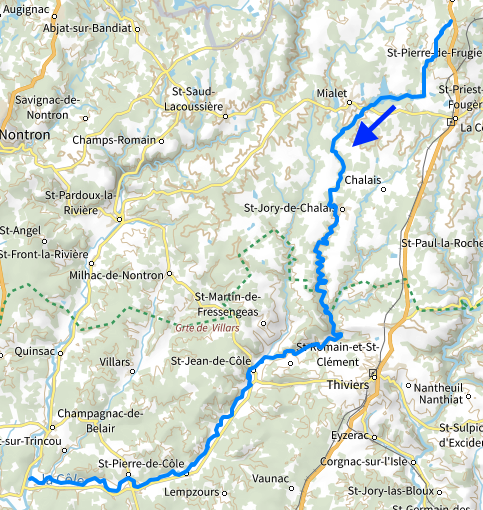

Location
- Country: France

Physical characteristics
- Source
  - location: Firbeix
  - coordinates: 45°34′59″N 00°58′01″E
  - elevation: 370 m (1,210 ft)
- Mouth
  - location: Dronne
  - coordinates: 45°22′08″N 00°41′05″E
  - elevation: 105 m (344 ft)
- Length: 51.5 km (32.0 mi)
- Basin size: 172 km^{2} (66 sq mi)

Basin features
- Progression: Dronne→ Isle→ Dordogne→ Gironde estuary→ Atlantic Ocean

The Côle (French: la Côle) is a 51.5 km (32.0 mi) long river in the Dordogne département, south-central France. It rises near le Châtenet, a hamlet in Firbeix. It flows generally southwest. It is a left tributary of the Dronne into which it flows between Condat-sur-Trincou and Brantôme.

== Communes along its course ==
This list is ordered from source to mouth: Firbeix, La Coquille, Mialet, Saint-Jory-de-Chalais, Saint-Romain-et-Saint-Clément, Thiviers, Saint-Jean-de-Côle, Saint-Pierre-de-Côle, La Chapelle-Faucher, Condat-sur-Trincou, Brantôme
