= Mialet, Dordogne =

Mialet
- Commune
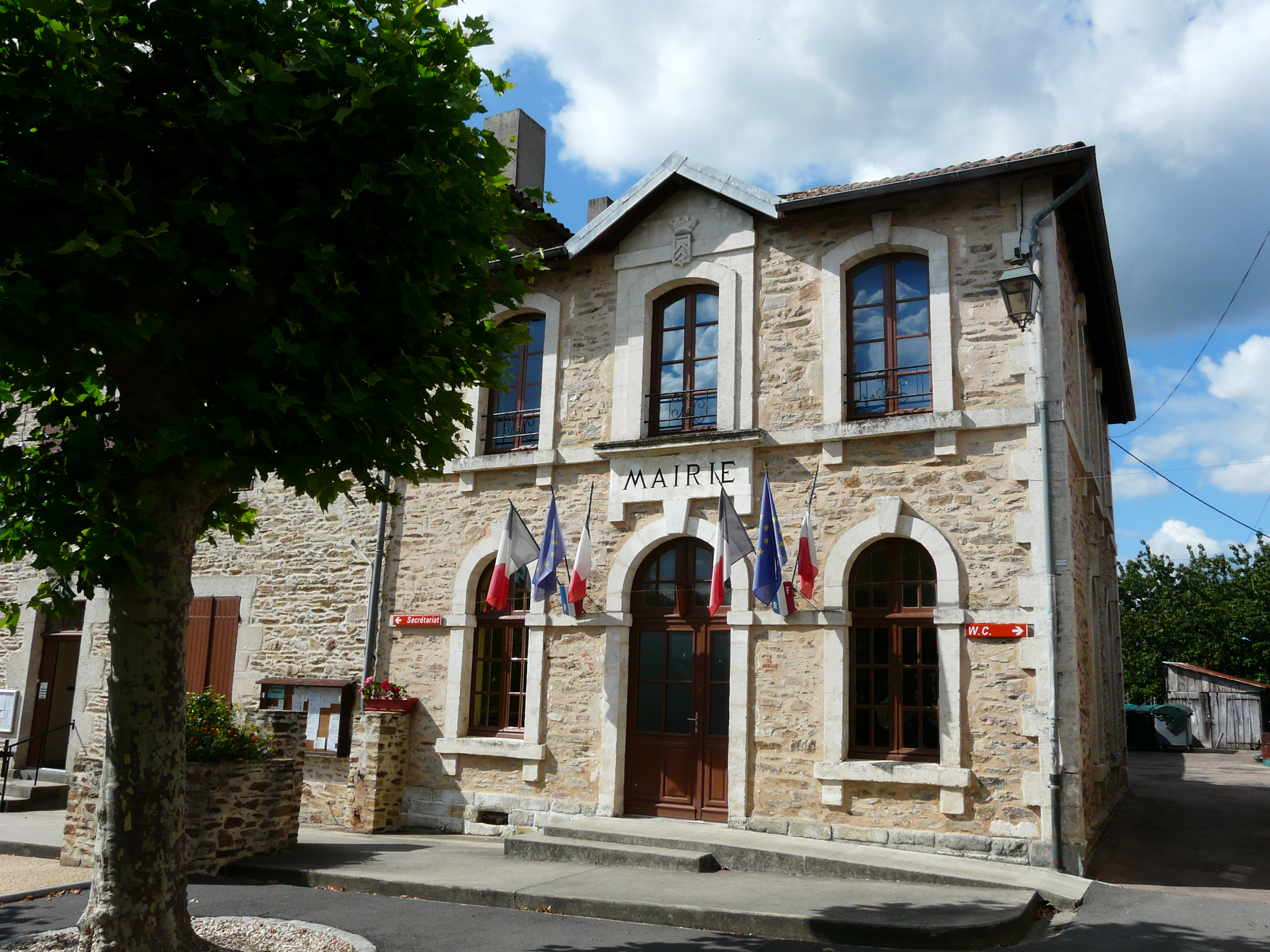
- The town hall in Mialet

- Coat of arms
- Location of Mialet
- Location within France Location within Nouvelle-Aquitaine
- Coordinates: 45°33′02″N 0°54′17″E
- Country: France
- Region: Nouvelle-Aquitaine
- Department: Dordogne
- Arrondissement: Nontron
- Canton: Thiviers

Government
  - Mayor (2020–2026): Dominique Marceteau
- Area^{1}: 37.30 km^{2} (14.40 sq mi)
- Elevation: 320 m (1,050 ft)
- Highest elevation: 391 m (1,283 ft)
- Lowest elevation: 250 m (820 ft)
- Population (2023): 628
  - Density: 16.8/km^{2} (43.6/sq mi)
- Time zone: UTC+01:00 (CET)
  - Summer (DST): UTC+02:00 (CEST)
- INSEE/Postal code: 24269 /24450
- ^{1} French Land Register data, which excludes lakes, ponds, glaciers > 1 km^{2} (0.386 sq mi or 247 acres) and river estuaries.

Mialet (French pronunciation: [mjalɛ]; Occitan: Mialet) is a commune in the Dordogne department in Nouvelle-Aquitaine in southwestern France.

== Geography ==
The Côle flows southwest through the southern part of the commune.

== Population ==
Historical population
Year	Pop.	±% p.a.
1968	1,094	—
1975	1,006	−1.19%
1982	888	−1.77%
1990	795	−1.37%
1999	717	−1.14%
2007	681	−0.64%
2012	686	+0.15%
2017	613	−2.23%
2023	628	+0.40%
Source: INSEE

== See also ==
- Communes of the Dordogne department
