= Cantillac =

- Part of Brantôme en Périgord
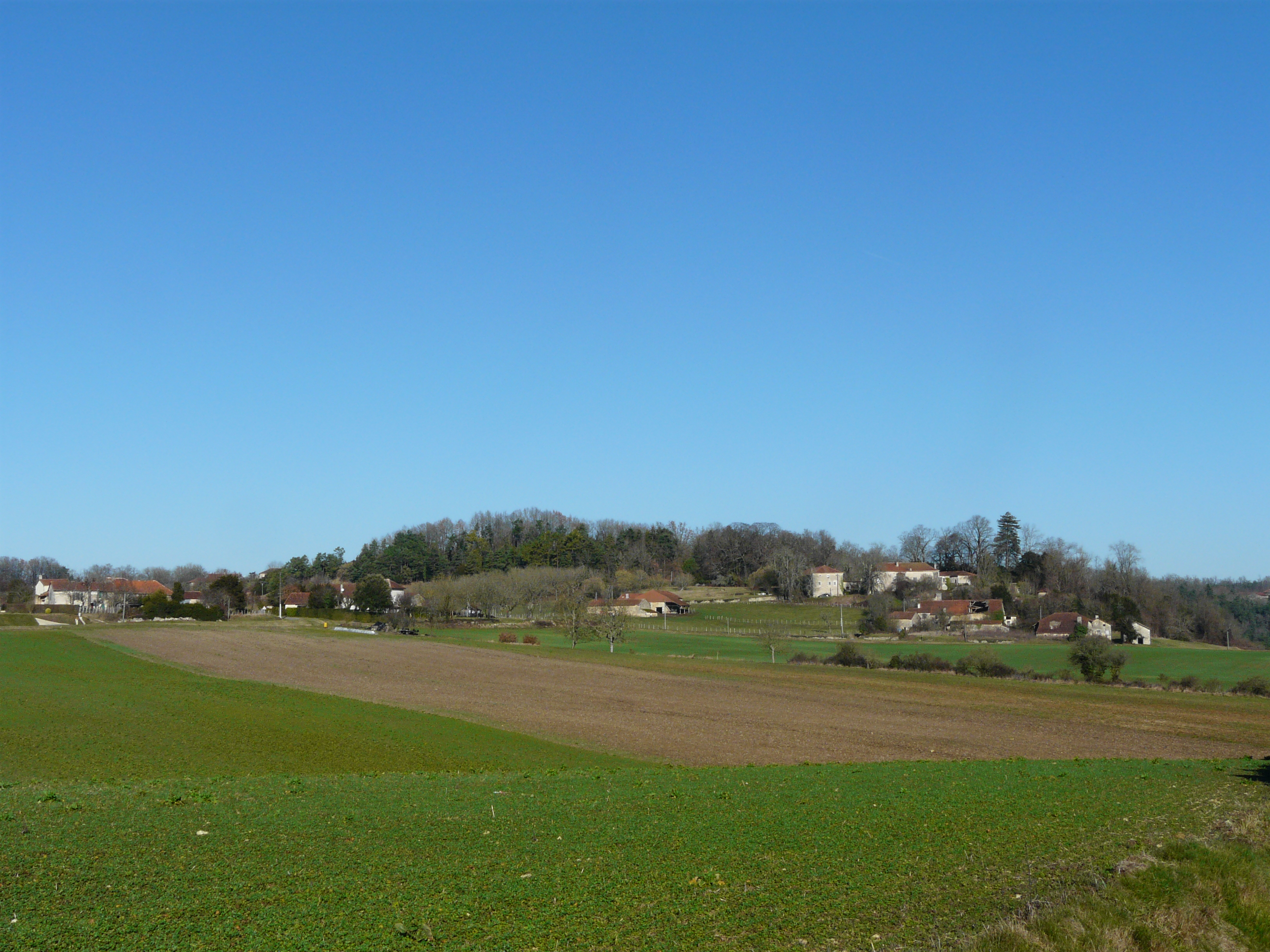
- Location of Cantillac
- Location within France Location within Nouvelle-Aquitaine
- Coordinates: 45°23′51″N 0°38′32″E
- Country: France
- Region: Nouvelle-Aquitaine
- Department: Dordogne
- Arrondissement: Nontron
- Canton: Brantôme
- Commune: Brantôme en Périgord
- Area^{1}: 8.12 km^{2} (3.14 sq mi)
- Elevation: 240 m (790 ft)
- Highest elevation: 233 m (764 ft)
- Lowest elevation: 124 m (407 ft)
- Population (2023): 187
  - Density: 23.0/km^{2} (59.6/sq mi)
- Time zone: UTC+01:00 (CET)
  - Summer (DST): UTC+02:00 (CEST)
- Postal code: 24530
- ^{1} French Land Register data, which excludes lakes, ponds, glaciers > 1 km^{2} (0.386 sq mi or 247 acres) and river estuaries.

Cantillac (French pronunciation: [kɑ̃tijak]; Occitan: Cantilhac) is a former commune in the Dordogne department in Nouvelle-Aquitaine in southwestern France. On 1 January 2019, it was merged into the commune Brantôme en Périgord.

== See also ==
- Communes of the Dordogne department
