= Condat-sur-Trincou =

- Commune
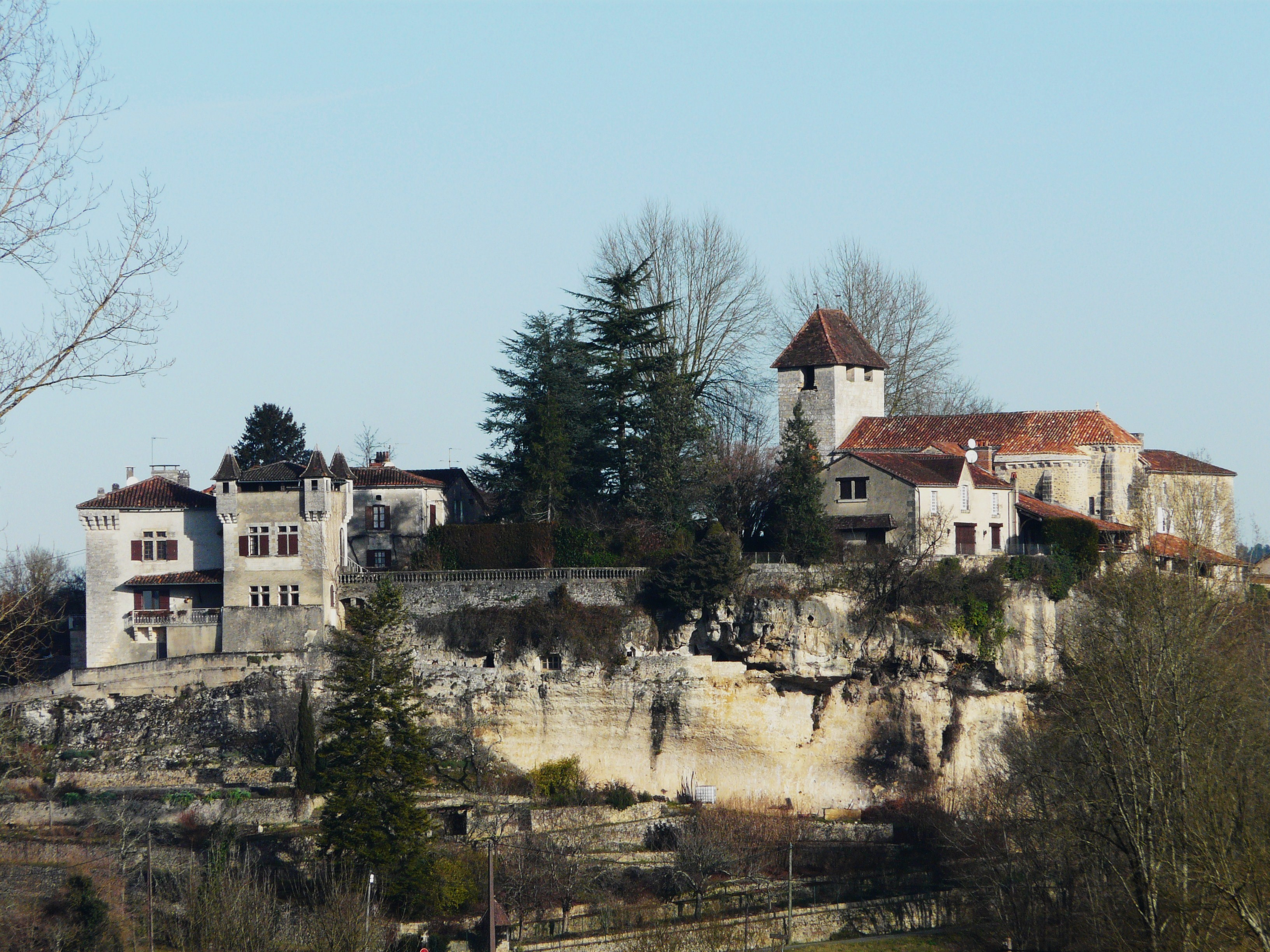
- A general view of Condat-sur-Trincou
- Location of Condat-sur-Trincou
- Location within France Location within Nouvelle-Aquitaine
- Coordinates: 45°22′59″N 0°42′32″E
- Country: France
- Region: Nouvelle-Aquitaine
- Department: Dordogne
- Arrondissement: Nontron
- Canton: Brantôme en Périgord

Government
  - Mayor (2020–2026): Francis Millaret
- Area^{1}: 16.54 km^{2} (6.39 sq mi)
- Elevation: 143 m (469 ft)
- Highest elevation: 208 m (682 ft)
- Lowest elevation: 104 m (341 ft)
- Population (2023): 504
  - Density: 30.5/km^{2} (78.9/sq mi)
- Time zone: UTC+01:00 (CET)
  - Summer (DST): UTC+02:00 (CEST)
- INSEE/Postal code: 24129 /24530
- ^{1} French Land Register data, which excludes lakes, ponds, glaciers > 1 km^{2} (0.386 sq mi or 247 acres) and river estuaries.

Condat-sur-Trincou (French pronunciation: [kɔ̃da syʁ tʁɛ̃ku]; Occitan: Condat de Trincor) is a commune in the Dordogne department in Nouvelle-Aquitaine in southwestern France.

== Geography ==
The village lies on the right bank of the Trincou, which flows southwest through the northern part of the commune, before to flow into the Côle.

The Côle flows west through the middle of the commune, forms part of its southwestern border, then flows into the Dronne, which forms part of the commune's western border.

== Population ==
Historical population
Year	Pop.	±% p.a.
1968	386	—
1975	352	−1.31%
1982	325	−1.13%
1990	376	+1.84%
1999	407	+0.88%
2007	488	+2.29%
2012	469	−0.79%
2017	480	+0.46%
2023	504	+0.82%
Source: INSEE

== See also ==
- Communes of the Dordogne department
