= Brantôme en Périgord =

- Commune
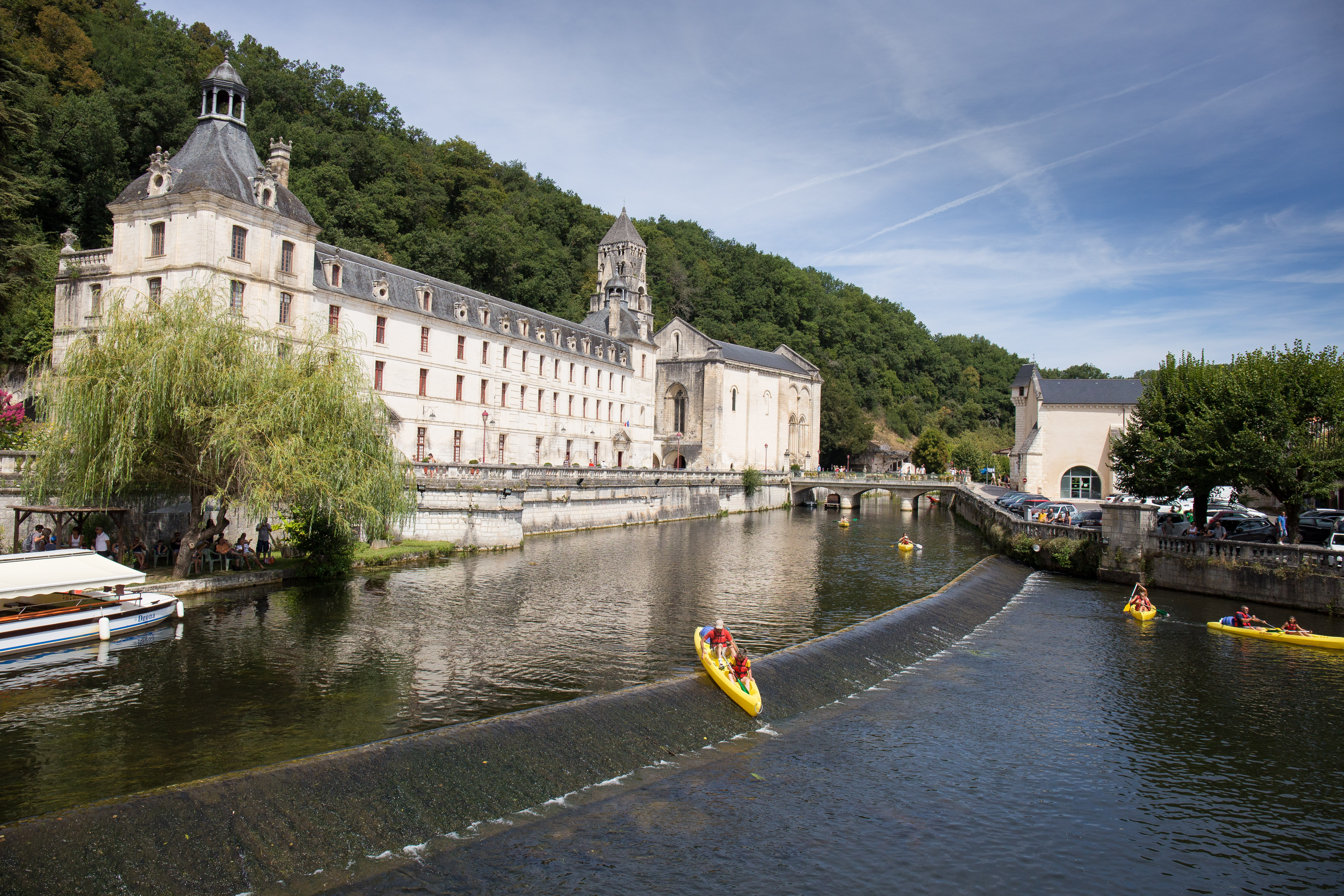
- A general view of Brantôme
- Location of Brantôme en Périgord
- Location within France Location within Nouvelle-Aquitaine
- Coordinates: 45°21′50″N 0°38′49″E
- Country: France
- Region: Nouvelle-Aquitaine
- Department: Dordogne
- Arrondissement: Nontron
- Canton: Brantôme en Périgord
- Intercommunality: Dronne et Belle

Government
  - Mayor (2020–2026): Monique Ratinaud
- Area^{1}: 133.33 km^{2} (51.48 sq mi)
- Population (2023): 3,763
  - Density: 28.22/km^{2} (73.10/sq mi)
- Time zone: UTC+01:00 (CET)
  - Summer (DST): UTC+02:00 (CEST)
- INSEE/Postal code: 24064 /24310
- ^{1} French Land Register data, which excludes lakes, ponds, glaciers > 1 km^{2} (0.386 sq mi or 247 acres) and river estuaries.

Brantôme en Périgord (French pronunciation: [bʁɑ̃tom ɑ̃ peʁiɡɔʁ], literally Brantôme in Périgord; Occitan: Brantòsme de Perigòrd) is a commune in the Dordogne department of southwestern France. The municipality was established on 1 January 2016 by the merger of the former communes of Brantôme and Saint-Julien-de-Bourdeilles. On 1 January 2019, the former communes of Cantillac, Eyvirat, La Gonterie-Boulouneix, Saint-Crépin-de-Richemont, Sencenac-Puy-de-Fourches and Valeuil were merged into Brantôme en Périgord.

== Population ==
Population data refer to the commune in its geography as of January 2025.

Historical population
Year	Pop.	±% p.a.
1968	3,596	—
1975	3,474	−0.49%
1982	3,558	+0.34%
1990	3,455	−0.37%
1999	3,552	+0.31%
2007	3,748	+0.67%
2012	3,805	+0.30%
2017	3,702	−0.55%
2023	3,763	+0.27%
Source: INSEE

== See also ==
- Communes of the Dordogne department
