= Jardin botanique d'Alaije =

Botanical garden in Brantôme, Dordogne, Aquitaine, France

Coordinates: 45°21′54″N 0°38′59″E

The Jardin botanique d'Alaije is a botanical garden with an emphasis on vegetables, located in Brantôme, Dordogne, Aquitaine, France. It is open weekdays; admission is free.

The garden opened to the public in 1998, and currently contains about 800 plant varieties with a focus on ancient and forgotten vegetables, but also including ornamental, aromatic, and medicinal plants, etc. It is organized into eight sections: medieval, vegetables, Solanaceae, square gardens, aromatics, grasses, Cucurbitaceae, and medicinal plants.

== See also ==
- List of botanical gardens in France
