= Valeuil =

- Part of Brantôme en Périgord
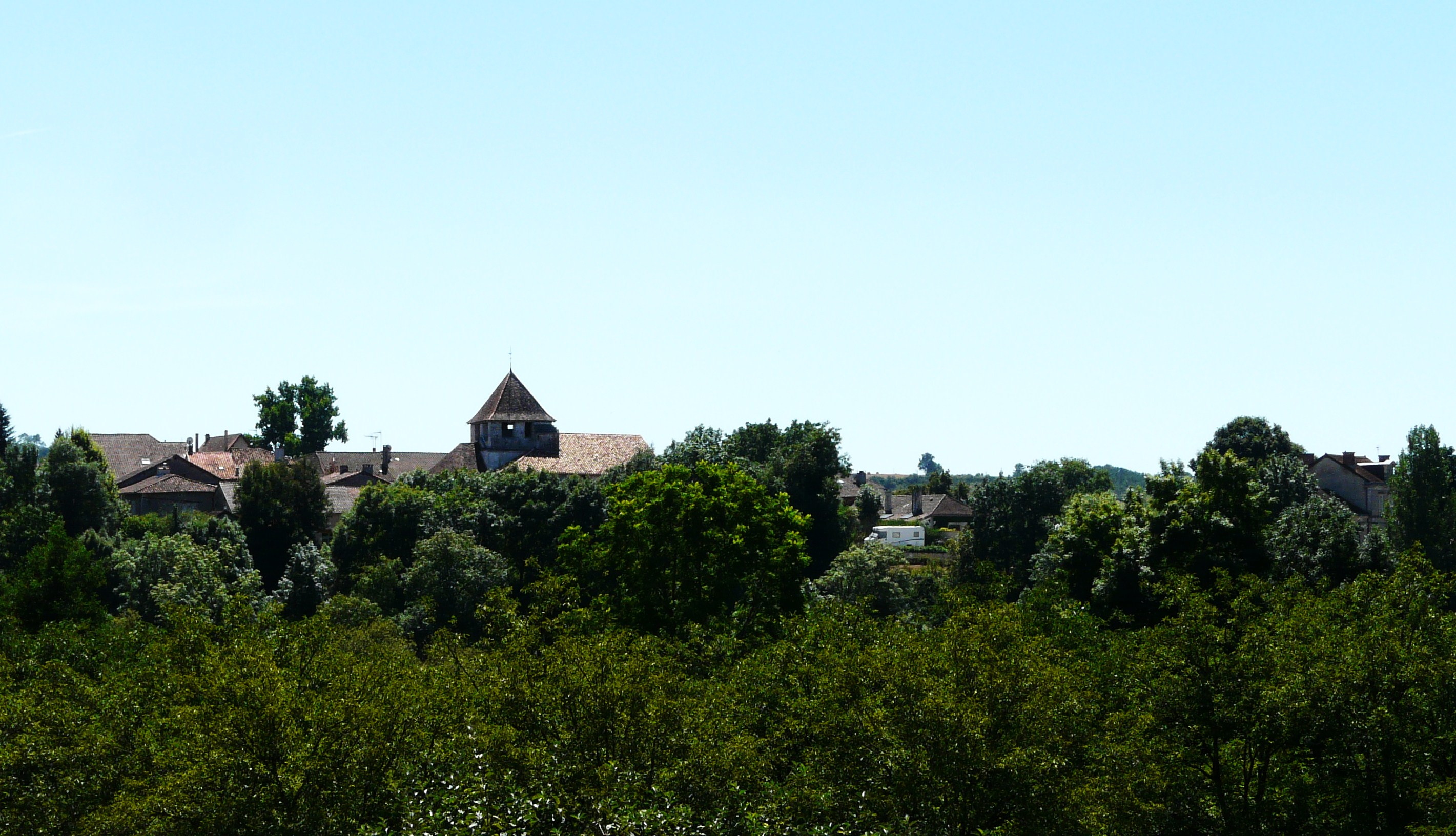

- Coat of arms
- Location of Valeuil
- Location within France Location within Nouvelle-Aquitaine
- Coordinates: 45°20′02″N 0°37′06″E
- Country: France
- Region: Nouvelle-Aquitaine
- Department: Dordogne
- Arrondissement: Nontron
- Canton: Brantôme
- Commune: Brantôme en Périgord
- Area^{1}: 18.5 km^{2} (7.1 sq mi)
- Highest elevation: 237 m (778 ft)
- Lowest elevation: 92 m (302 ft)
- Population (2023): 340
  - Density: 18/km^{2} (48/sq mi)
- Time zone: UTC+01:00 (CET)
  - Summer (DST): UTC+02:00 (CEST)
- Postal code: 24310
- ^{1} French Land Register data, which excludes lakes, ponds, glaciers > 1 km^{2} (0.386 sq mi or 247 acres) and river estuaries.

Valeuil (French pronunciation: [valœj]) is a former commune in the Dordogne department in Nouvelle-Aquitaine in southwestern France. On 1 January 2019, it was merged into the commune Brantôme en Périgord.

== See also ==
- Communes of the Dordogne department
