= Eyvirat =

- Part of Brantôme en Périgord
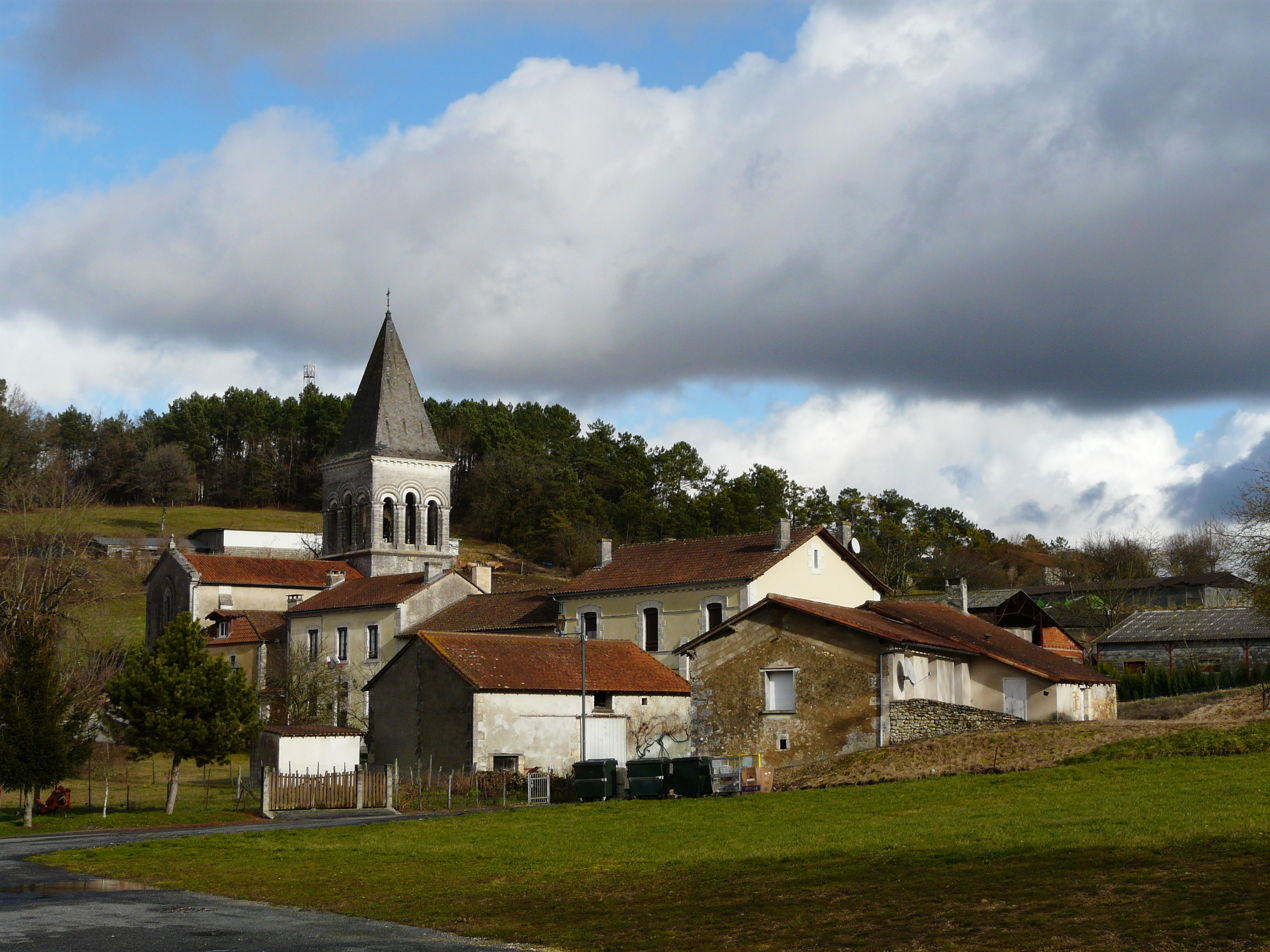
- Location of Eyvirat
- Location within France Location within Nouvelle-Aquitaine
- Coordinates: 45°19′25″N 0°45′14″E
- Country: France
- Region: Nouvelle-Aquitaine
- Department: Dordogne
- Arrondissement: Nontron
- Canton: Brantôme
- Commune: Brantôme en Périgord
- Area^{1}: 17.95 km^{2} (6.93 sq mi)
- Highest elevation: 250 m (820 ft)
- Lowest elevation: 134 m (440 ft)
- Population (2023): 303
  - Density: 16.9/km^{2} (43.7/sq mi)
- Time zone: UTC+01:00 (CET)
  - Summer (DST): UTC+02:00 (CEST)
- Postal code: 24460
- ^{1} French Land Register data, which excludes lakes, ponds, glaciers > 1 km^{2} (0.386 sq mi or 247 acres) and river estuaries.

Eyvirat (French pronunciation: [eviʁa]; Occitan: Eivirac) is a former commune in the Dordogne department in Nouvelle-Aquitaine in southwestern France. On 1 January 2019, it was merged into the commune Brantôme en Périgord.

== See also ==
- Communes of the Dordogne department
