= Saint-Jean-de-Côle =

- Commune
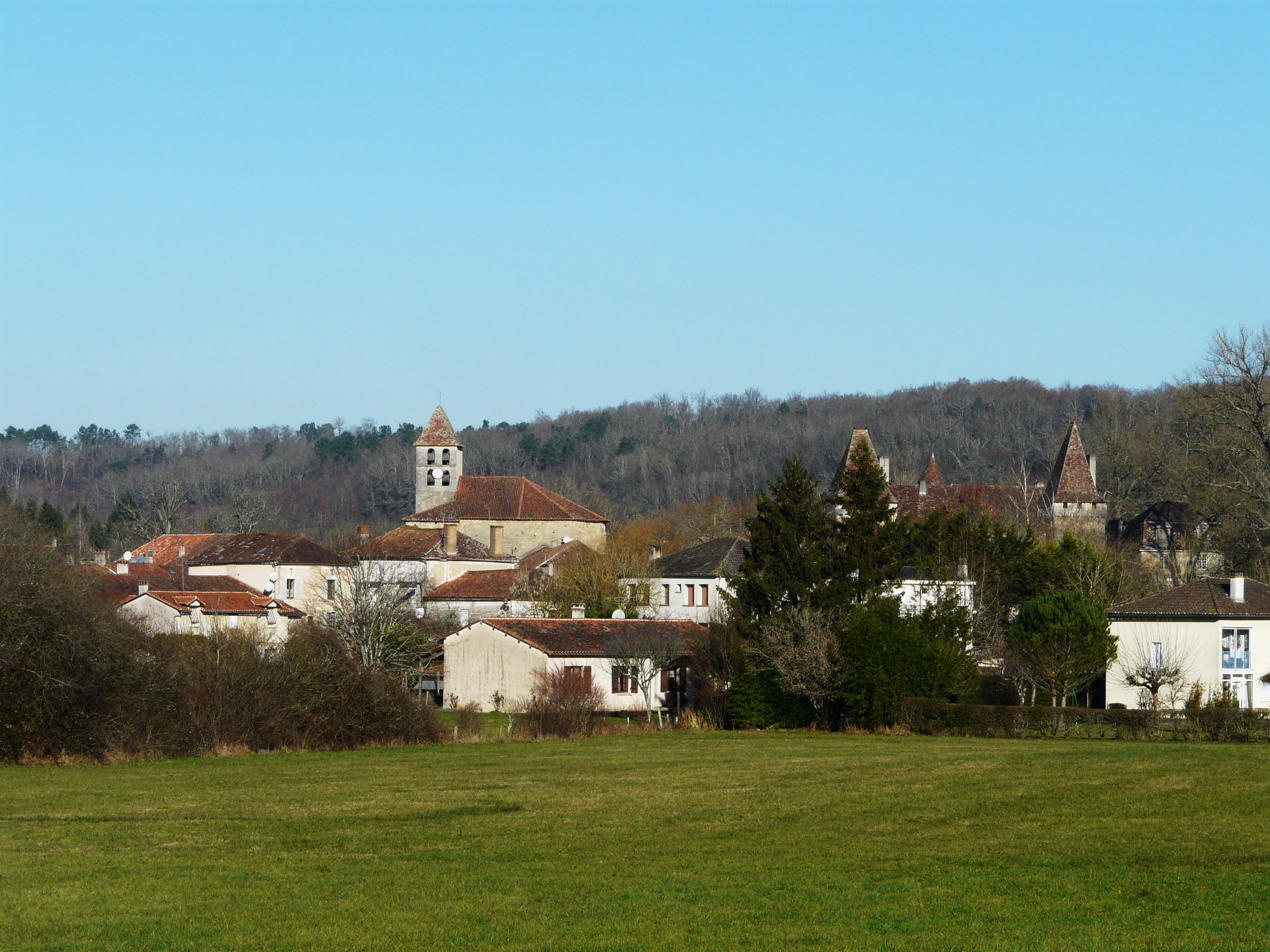
- A general view of Saint-Jean-de-Côle
- Location of Saint-Jean-de-Côle
- Location within France Location within Nouvelle-Aquitaine
- Coordinates: 45°25′19″N 0°50′21″E
- Country: France
- Region: Nouvelle-Aquitaine
- Department: Dordogne
- Arrondissement: Nontron
- Canton: Thiviers

Government
  - Mayor (2020–2026): Francis Sedan
- Area^{1}: 12.70 km^{2} (4.90 sq mi)
- Elevation: 149 m (489 ft)
- Highest elevation: 252 m (827 ft)
- Lowest elevation: 135 m (443 ft)
- Population (2023): 354
  - Density: 27.9/km^{2} (72.2/sq mi)
- Time zone: UTC+01:00 (CET)
  - Summer (DST): UTC+02:00 (CEST)
- INSEE/Postal code: 24425 /24800
- ^{1} French Land Register data, which excludes lakes, ponds, glaciers > 1 km^{2} (0.386 sq mi or 247 acres) and river estuaries.

Saint-Jean-de-Côle (French pronunciation: [sɛ̃ ʒɑ̃ də kol], literally Saint-Jean of Côle; Limousin: Sent Joan de Còla) is a commune in the Dordogne department in Nouvelle-Aquitaine in southwestern France. It is a member of Les Plus Beaux Villages de France (The Most Beautiful Villages of France) Association.

== Geography ==
The Côle flows south-southwest through the middle of the commune and crosses the village.

== Population ==
Historical population
Year	Pop.	±% p.a.
1968	318	—
1975	318	+0.00%
1982	343	+1.09%
1990	339	−0.15%
1999	326	−0.43%
2007	347	+0.78%
2012	360	+0.74%
2017	365	+0.28%
2023	354	−0.51%
Source: INSEE

Views of Saint-Jean-de-Côle

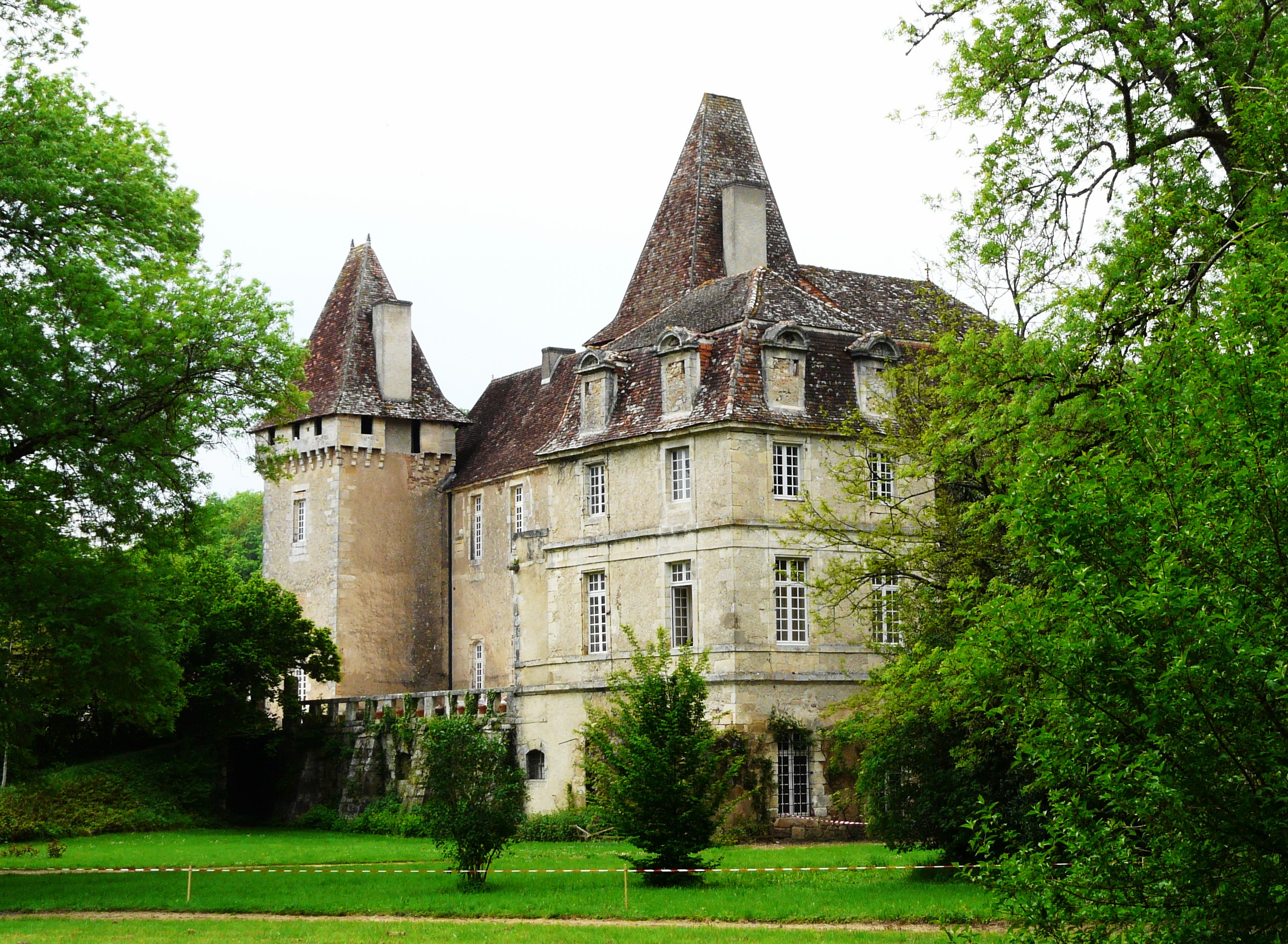

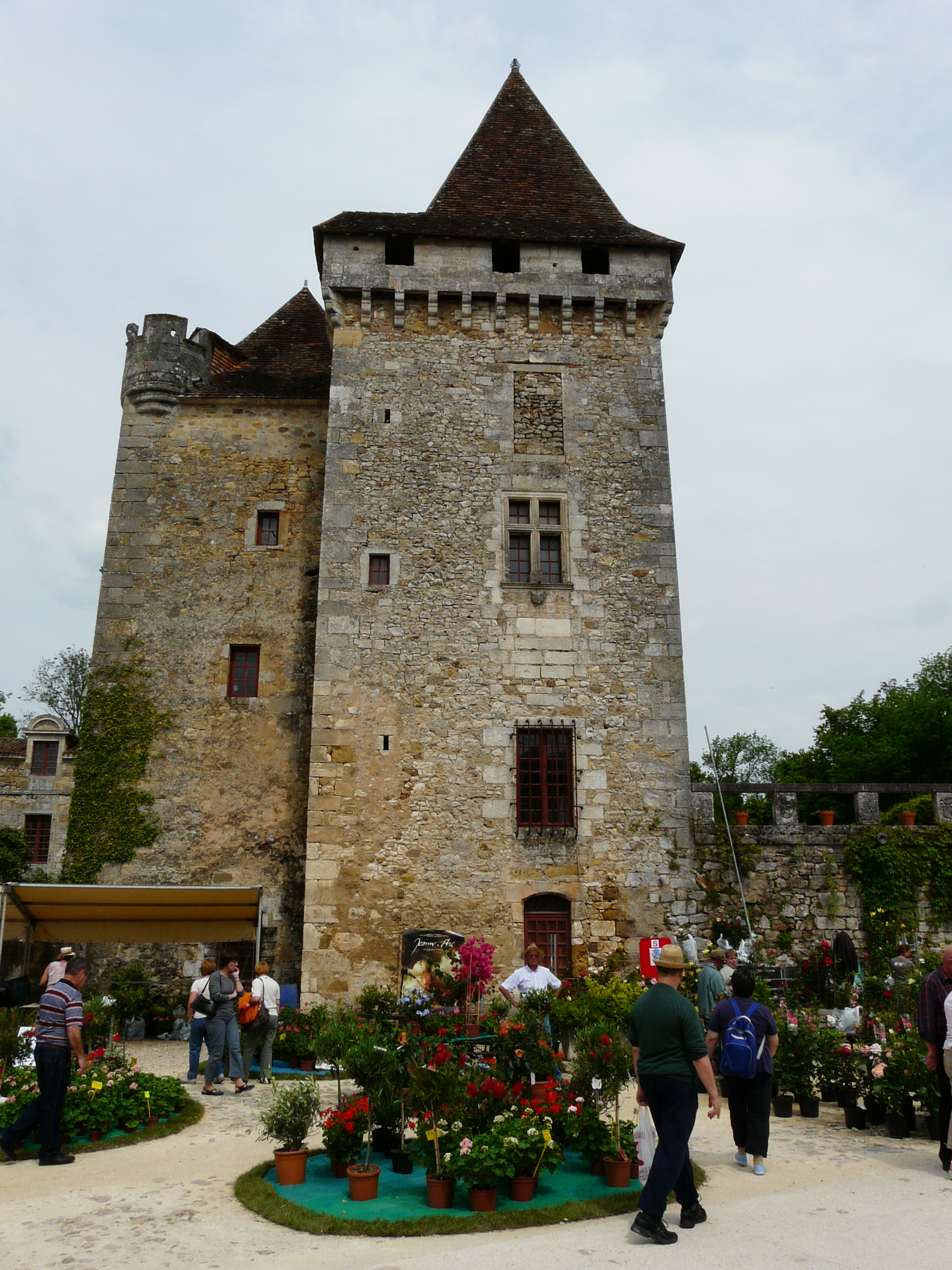

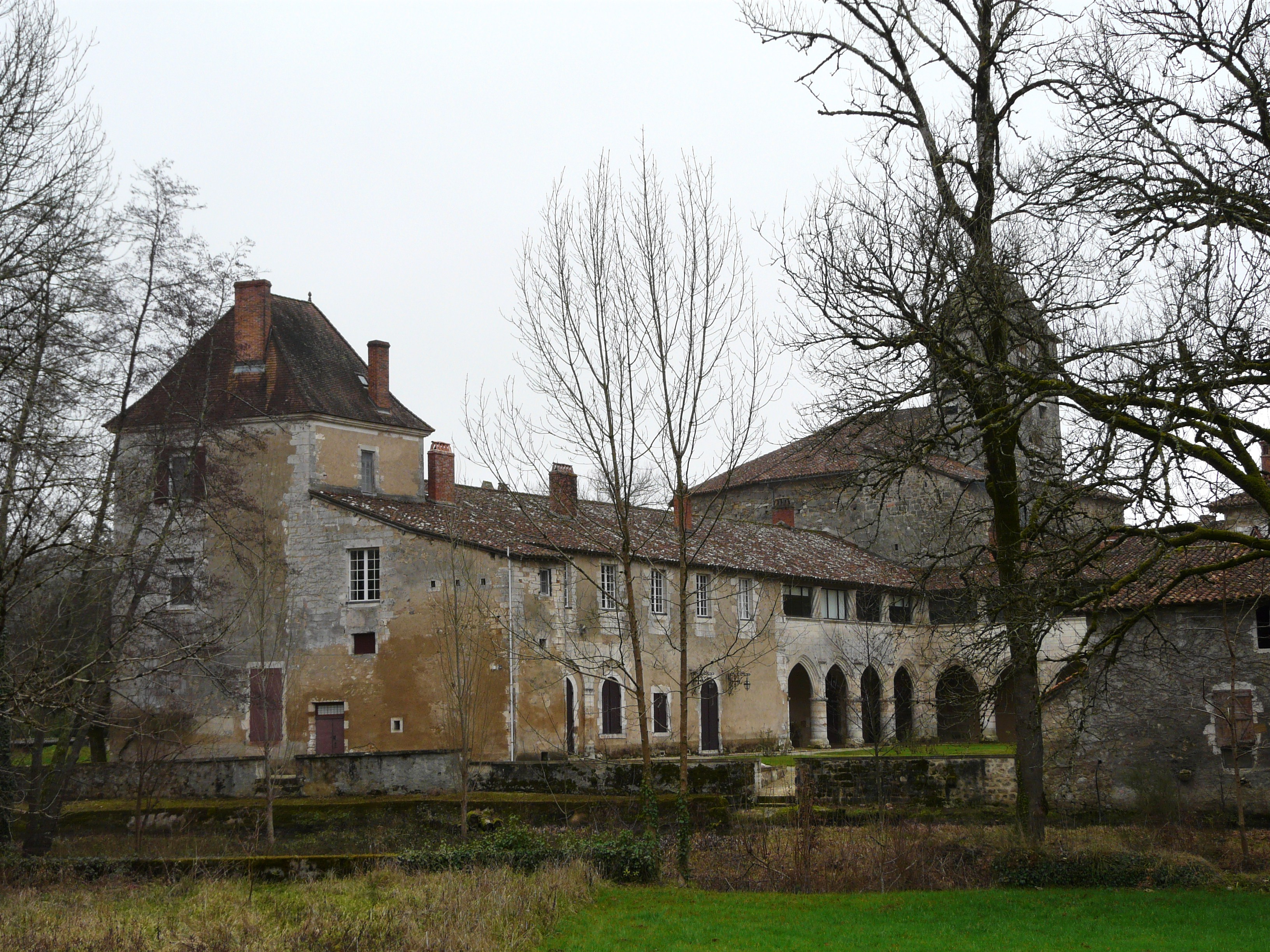

== See also ==
- Communes of the Dordogne department
