= Saint-Julien-de-Bourdeilles =

- Part of Brantôme en Périgord
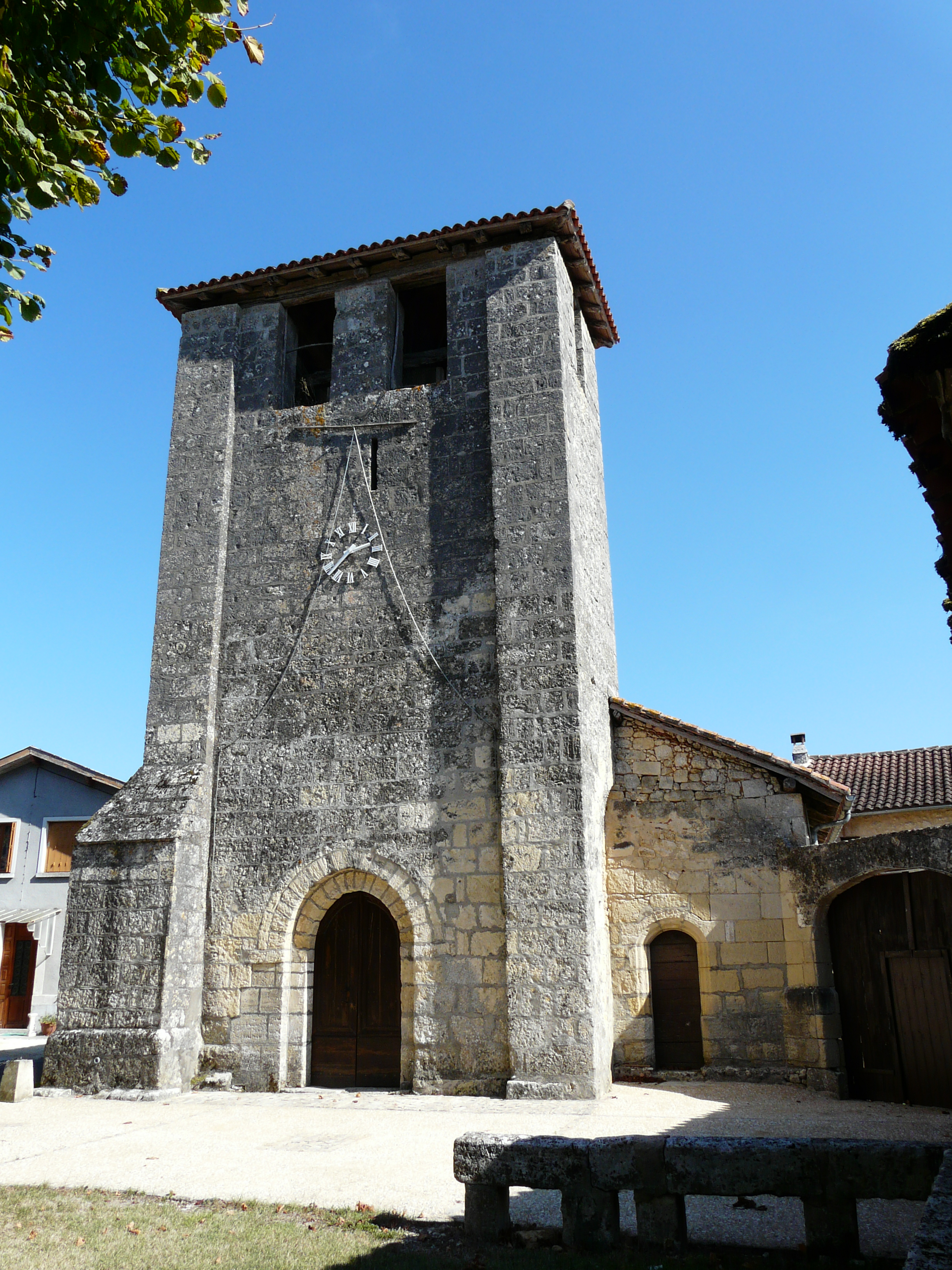
- Location of Saint-Julien-de-Bourdeilles
- Location within France Location within Nouvelle-Aquitaine
- Coordinates: 45°21′39″N 0°35′21″E
- Country: France
- Region: Nouvelle-Aquitaine
- Department: Dordogne
- Arrondissement: Périgueux
- Canton: Brantôme
- Commune: Brantôme en Périgord
- Area^{1}: 5.95 km^{2} (2.30 sq mi)
- Highest elevation: 200 m (660 ft)
- Lowest elevation: 100 m (330 ft)
- Population (2023): 94
  - Density: 16/km^{2} (41/sq mi)
- Time zone: UTC+01:00 (CET)
  - Summer (DST): UTC+02:00 (CEST)
- Postal code: 24310
- ^{1} French Land Register data, which excludes lakes, ponds, glaciers > 1 km^{2} (0.386 sq mi or 247 acres) and river estuaries.

Saint-Julien-de-Bourdeilles (French pronunciation: [sɛ̃ ʒyljɛ̃ də buʁdɛj], literally Saint-Julien of Bourdeilles; Limousin: Sent Júlia de Bordelha or Sent Júlian de Bordelha) is a former commune in the Dordogne department in southwestern France. On 1 January 2016, it was merged into the new commune Brantôme en Périgord.

== See also ==
- Communes of the Dordogne department
