= Saint-Crépin-de-Richemont =

- Part of Brantôme en Périgord
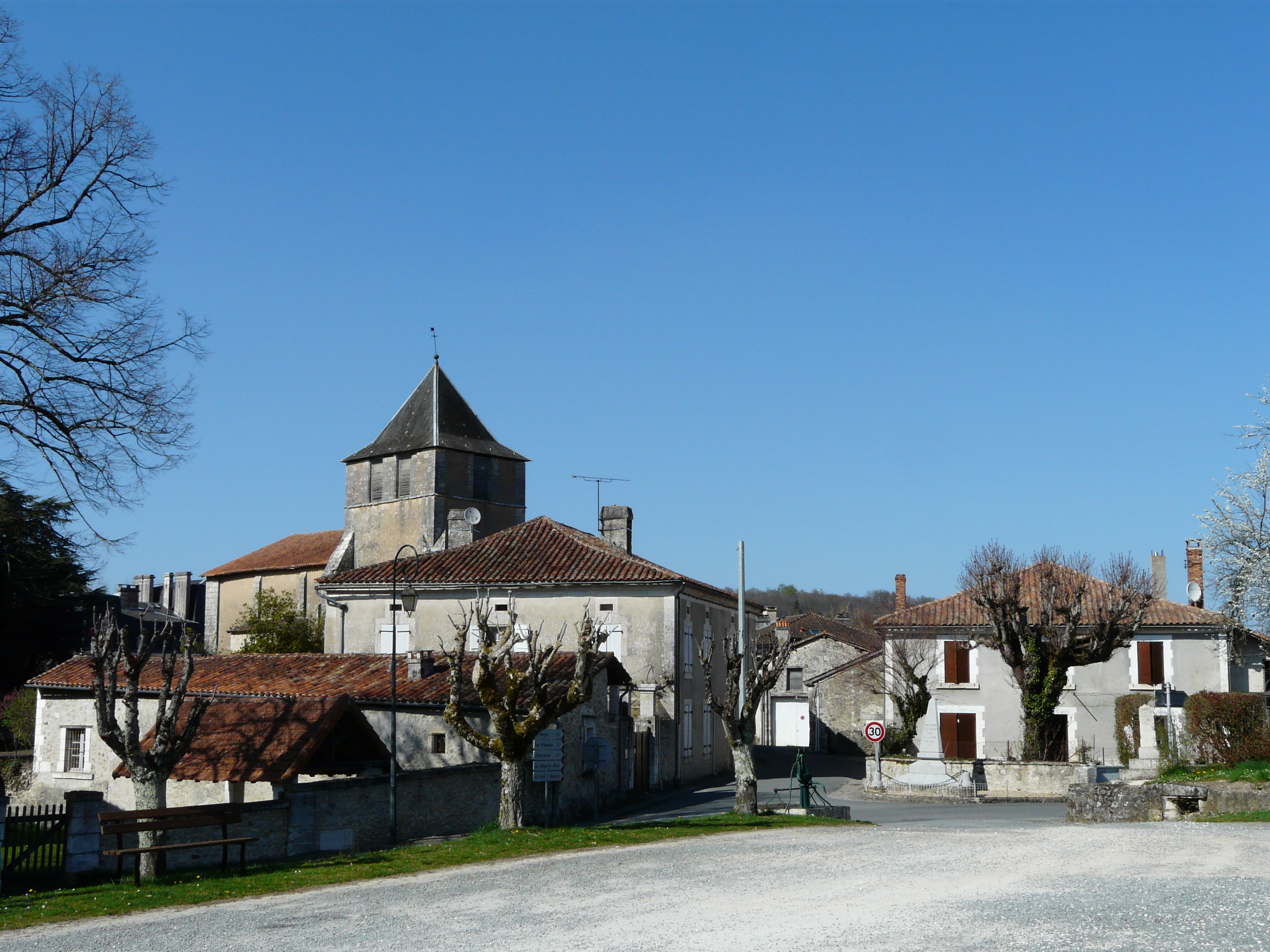
- Location of Saint-Crépin-de-Richemont
- Location within France Location within Nouvelle-Aquitaine
- Coordinates: 45°25′10″N 0°36′05″E
- Country: France
- Region: Nouvelle-Aquitaine
- Department: Dordogne
- Arrondissement: Nontron
- Canton: Brantôme
- Commune: Brantôme en Périgord
- Area^{1}: 25.58 km^{2} (9.88 sq mi)
- Elevation: 147 m (482 ft)
- Highest elevation: 246 m (807 ft)
- Lowest elevation: 120 m (390 ft)
- Population (2022): 235
  - Density: 9.19/km^{2} (23.8/sq mi)
- Time zone: UTC+01:00 (CET)
  - Summer (DST): UTC+02:00 (CEST)
- Postal code: 24310
- ^{1} French Land Register data, which excludes lakes, ponds, glaciers > 1 km^{2} (0.386 sq mi or 247 acres) and river estuaries.

Saint-Crépin-de-Richemont (French pronunciation: [sɛ̃ kʁepɛ̃ də ʁiʃmɔ̃]; Occitan: Sent Crespin de Richemont) is a former commune in the Dordogne department in Nouvelle-Aquitaine in southwestern France. On 1 January 2019, it was merged into the commune Brantôme en Périgord.

== See also ==
- Communes of the Dordogne department
