= Brantôme, Dordogne =

Brantôme
- Part of Brantôme en Périgord
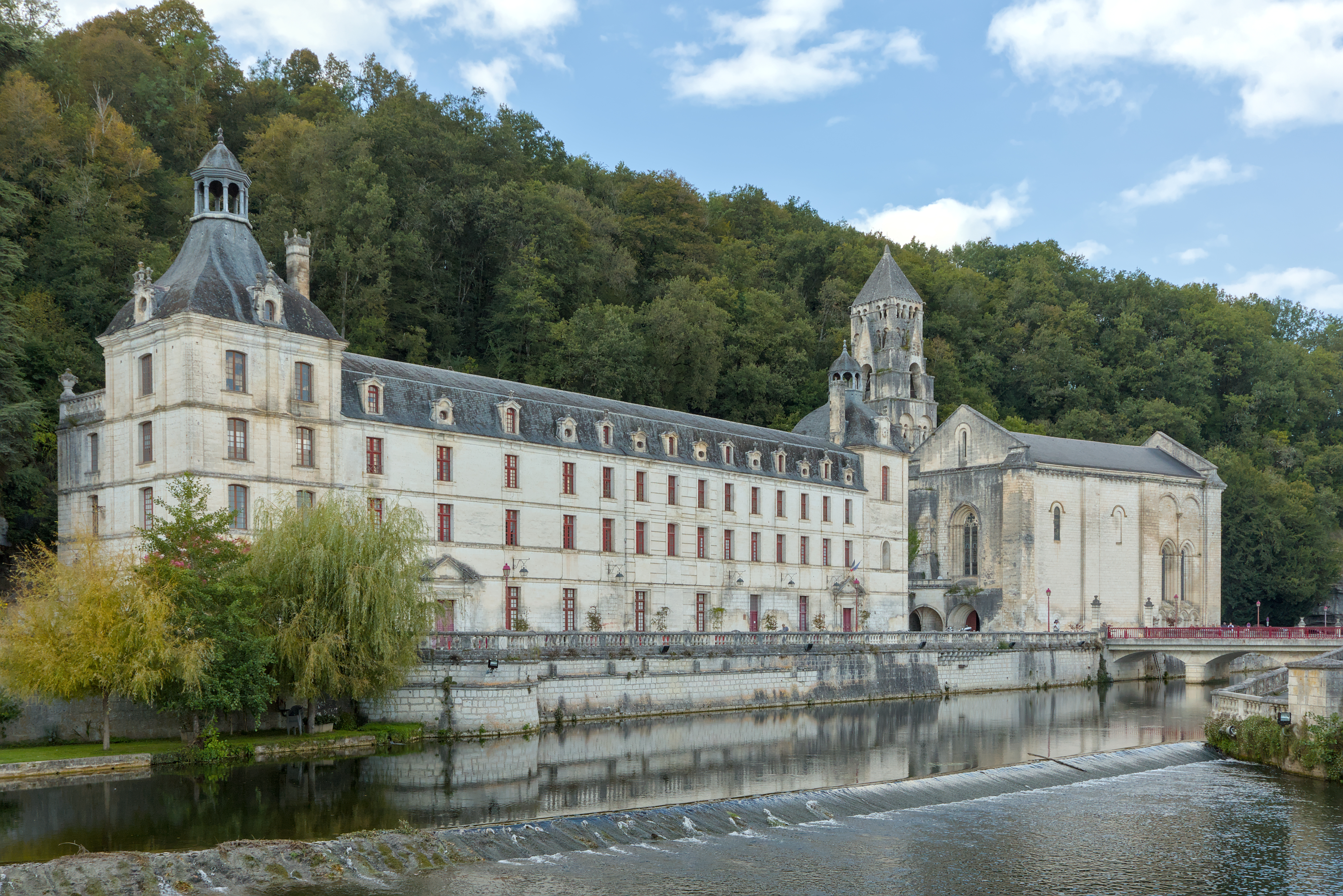
- Abbey of Brantôme and its bell tower

- Coat of arms
- Location of Brantôme
- Location within France Location within Nouvelle-Aquitaine
- Coordinates: 45°21′54″N 0°38′59″E
- Country: France
- Region: Nouvelle-Aquitaine
- Department: Dordogne
- Arrondissement: Périgueux
- Canton: Brantôme
- Commune: Brantôme en Périgord
- Area^{1}: 34.65 km^{2} (13.38 sq mi)
- Highest elevation: 208 m (682 ft)
- Lowest elevation: 94 m (308 ft)
- Population (2022): 2,088
  - Density: 60.26/km^{2} (156.1/sq mi)
- Time zone: UTC+01:00 (CET)
  - Summer (DST): UTC+02:00 (CEST)
- Postal code: 24310
- Website: www.mairie-brantome.fr
- ^{1} French Land Register data, which excludes lakes, ponds, glaciers > 1 km^{2} (0.386 sq mi or 247 acres) and river estuaries.

Brantôme (French pronunciation: [bʁɑ̃tom]; Occitan: Brantòsme) is a former commune in the Dordogne department in southwestern France. On 1 January 2016, it was merged into the new commune Brantôme en Périgord. It is the seat of the canton of Brantôme. Via Lemovicensis, an old pilgrimage route to Santiago de Compostela, runs through Brantôme. The commune, which retains its picturesque atmosphere, is situated along the river Dronne.

== History ==
The commune started to develop on an island encircled by a sweep of the river Dronne next to the Benedictine Abbey of Brantôme, which was founded in 769 by Charlemagne; according to legend he donated relics of Saint Sicarius (Sicaire), one of the infants in the Massacre of the Innocents. Those relics attracted pilgrims to the abbey, who also brought a certain affluence to Brantôme, but in spite of St. Sicaire's protection, the abbey was laid waste in 848 and in 857 by Viking rovers who had advanced along the Dordogne and Isle rivers to the Dronne. The abbey was rebuilt towards the end of the tenth century and again in 1465 and in 1480 after the end of the Hundred Years' War.

Its Romanesque bell-tower is a competitor for the title "oldest in France" (Note: Viollet-le-Duc included a drawing of it in his Dictionnaire to illustrate the entry "clocher".) and developed a high reputation. Here Bertrand du Guesclin, battling the English Angevins, apprised that he had been made Constable of France by Charles V. Pierre de Mareuil, abbot from 1538–56, built a right-angled bridge, the Pont Coudé, over the river, which connected the elegant Renaissance abbot's lodging he built for himself with its garden, which lay on the opposite bank. He was succeeded by his nephew, Pierre de Bourdeille (abbot from 1558–1614), a soldier and writer better known by his title as Abbé Brantôme, whose diplomacy saved the abbey and its commune from the Huguenot forces of Gaspard de Coligny on two occasions in 1569 during the Wars of Religion. At the French Revolution, the abbey was secularised as a bien national, the last seven monks pensioned and its rich library dispersed.

== Geography ==
The Côle forms part of the commune's north-eastern border, then flows into the Dronne, which flows southwestward through the middle of the commune.

== Population ==
Historical population
Year	Pop.	±% p.a.
1962	1,966	—
1968	1,991	+0.21%
1975	2,026	+0.25%
1982	2,101	+0.52%
1990	2,080	−0.13%
1999	2,043	−0.20%
2022	2,088	+0.09%
Source: EHESS and INSEE

== Sights ==
- Jardin botanique d'Alaije

== See also ==
- Communes of the Dordogne département
