= Geneviève Callerot =

French novelist and farmer (1916–2025)

- Born: 6 May 1916; Paris, France
- Died: 16 January 2025 (aged 108); Saint-Aulaye-Puymangou, France
- Occupations: Novelist, farmer
- Writing career
- Language: French

Geneviève Callerot (French: [ʒənvjɛv kalʁo]; 6 May 1916 – 16 January 2025) was a French novelist and farmer. During World War II, with her father and sister, she assisted more than 200 people in passing the demarcation line from the occupied French territory to the Zone libre, the unoccupied territory of Vichy France.

In 2018, at the age of 102, Callerot became a member of the Legion of Honour.

== Biography ==
Geneviève Callerot was born in Paris. Before the end of World War I she escaped the Paris shelling by the German siege guns to Périgord and settled in Saint-Aulaye (Département Dordogne). She took homeschooling by her parents.

The armistice of 22 June 1940 set the Demarcation line separating the German-occupied part of France to the zone libre near their residence. With her father and sister she started helping people passing the demarcation line. Until arrested and imprisoned for three weeks in October 1942, she helped Jews, children and wounded British and American soldiers to escape from the Nazi Regime-occupied territory over two years.

After the war, she rented with her husband a farm. In the 1960s her cousin, writer Jean-Charles discovered her skills in writing. In 1983 her book Les Cinq Filles du Grand-Barrail became a success.

Callerot turned 100 on 6 May 2016.

On 24 August 2018, she became a member of the Legion of Honour. The award was handed out by former member of departmental council of Dordogne Gérard Fayolle. Rejecting former offers, as an honor to her parents she accepted this award.

Callerot died in a care home in Saint-Aulaye-Puymangou on 16 January 2025, at the age of 108.

== Publications ==
- Les Cinq Filles du Grand-Barrail (in French). Éditions universitaires. 1983. ISBN 978-2-711-30239-0.
- Treize grains de maïs (in French). Éditions universitaires. 1986. ISBN 978-2-711-30342-7..
- L'Étang des Trois-Jules (in French). Publi-fusion. 1993. ISBN 978-2-907-26525-6..
- Quatre sons de cloche (in French). De Borée. 2001. ISBN 978-2-844-94069-8..
- La Demoiselle du Château (in French). Le Grand Livre du mois. 2014. ISBN 978-2-286-11385-8.

== See also ==
- List of Légion d'honneur recipients by name
