= Festalemps =

- Part of Saint Privat en Périgord
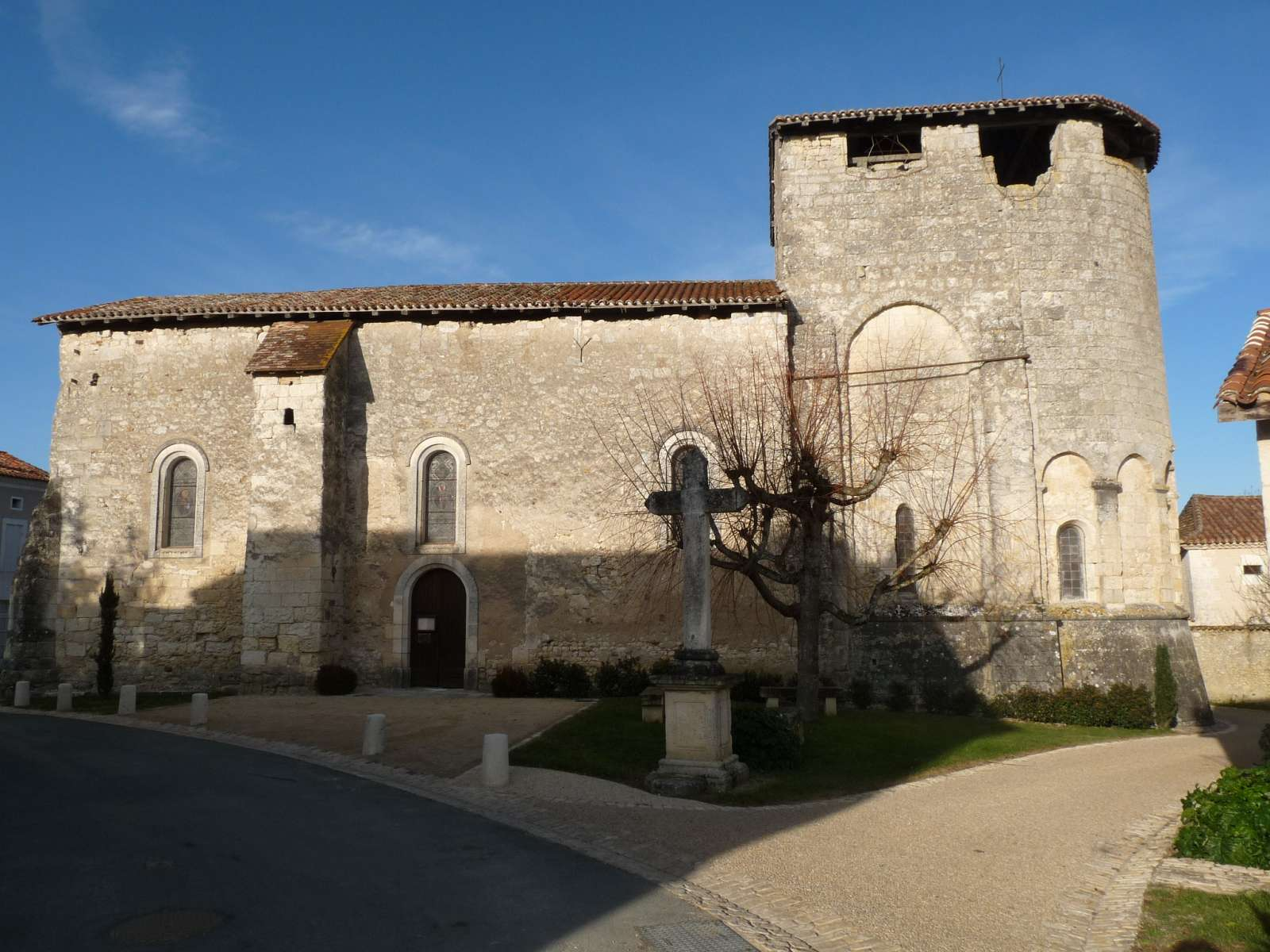

- Coat of arms
- Location of Festalemps
- Location within France Location within Nouvelle-Aquitaine
- Coordinates: 45°13′38″N 0°14′29″E
- Country: France
- Region: Nouvelle-Aquitaine
- Department: Dordogne
- Arrondissement: Périgueux
- Canton: Montpon-Ménestérol
- Commune: Saint Privat en Périgord
- Area^{1}: 12.27 km^{2} (4.74 sq mi)
- Elevation: 120 m (390 ft)
- Highest elevation: 137 m (449 ft)
- Lowest elevation: 47 m (154 ft)
- Population (2019): 247
  - Density: 20.1/km^{2} (52.1/sq mi)
- Time zone: UTC+01:00 (CET)
  - Summer (DST): UTC+02:00 (CEST)
- Postal code: 24410
- ^{1} French Land Register data, which excludes lakes, ponds, glaciers > 1 km^{2} (0.386 sq mi or 247 acres) and river estuaries.

Festalemps (French pronunciation: [fɛstalɛ̃]; Occitan: Festalems) is a former commune in the Dordogne department in Nouvelle-Aquitaine in southwestern France. On 1 January 2017, it was merged into the new commune Saint Privat en Périgord.

== See also ==
- Communes of the Dordogne department
