= Puymangou =

Commune in Dordogne, France

- Part of Saint-Aulaye-Puymangou
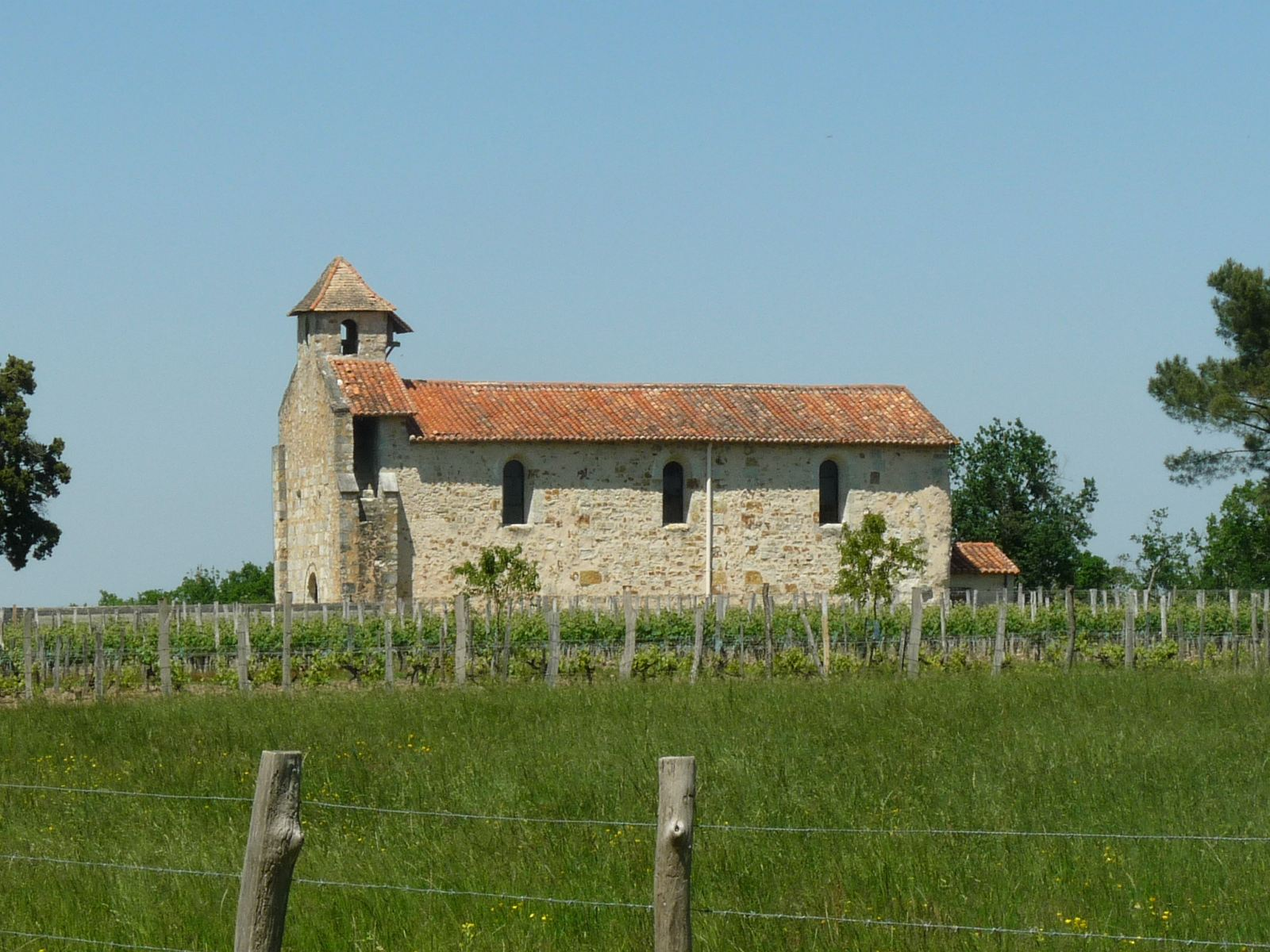

- Coat of arms
- Location of Puymangou
- Location within France Location within Nouvelle-Aquitaine
- Coordinates: 45°11′34″N 0°04′37″E
- Country: France
- Region: Nouvelle-Aquitaine
- Department: Dordogne
- Arrondissement: Périgueux
- Canton: Montpon-Ménestérol
- Commune: Saint-Aulaye-Puymangou
- Area^{1}: 11.29 km^{2} (4.36 sq mi)
- Elevation: 132 m (433 ft)
- Highest elevation: 134 m (440 ft)
- Lowest elevation: 41 m (135 ft)
- Population (2023): 78
  - Density: 6.9/km^{2} (18/sq mi)
- Time zone: UTC+01:00 (CET)
  - Summer (DST): UTC+02:00 (CEST)
- Postal code: 24410
- ^{1} French Land Register data, which excludes lakes, ponds, glaciers > 1 km^{2} (0.386 sq mi or 247 acres) and river estuaries.

Puymangou (French pronunciation: [pɥimɑ̃ɡu]; Occitan: Pueimangor) is a former commune in the Dordogne department in southwestern France. On 1 January 2016, it was merged into the new commune Saint-Aulaye-Puymangou.

== See also ==
- Communes of the Dordogne department
