= Saint-Privat-des-Prés =

- Part of Saint Privat en Périgord
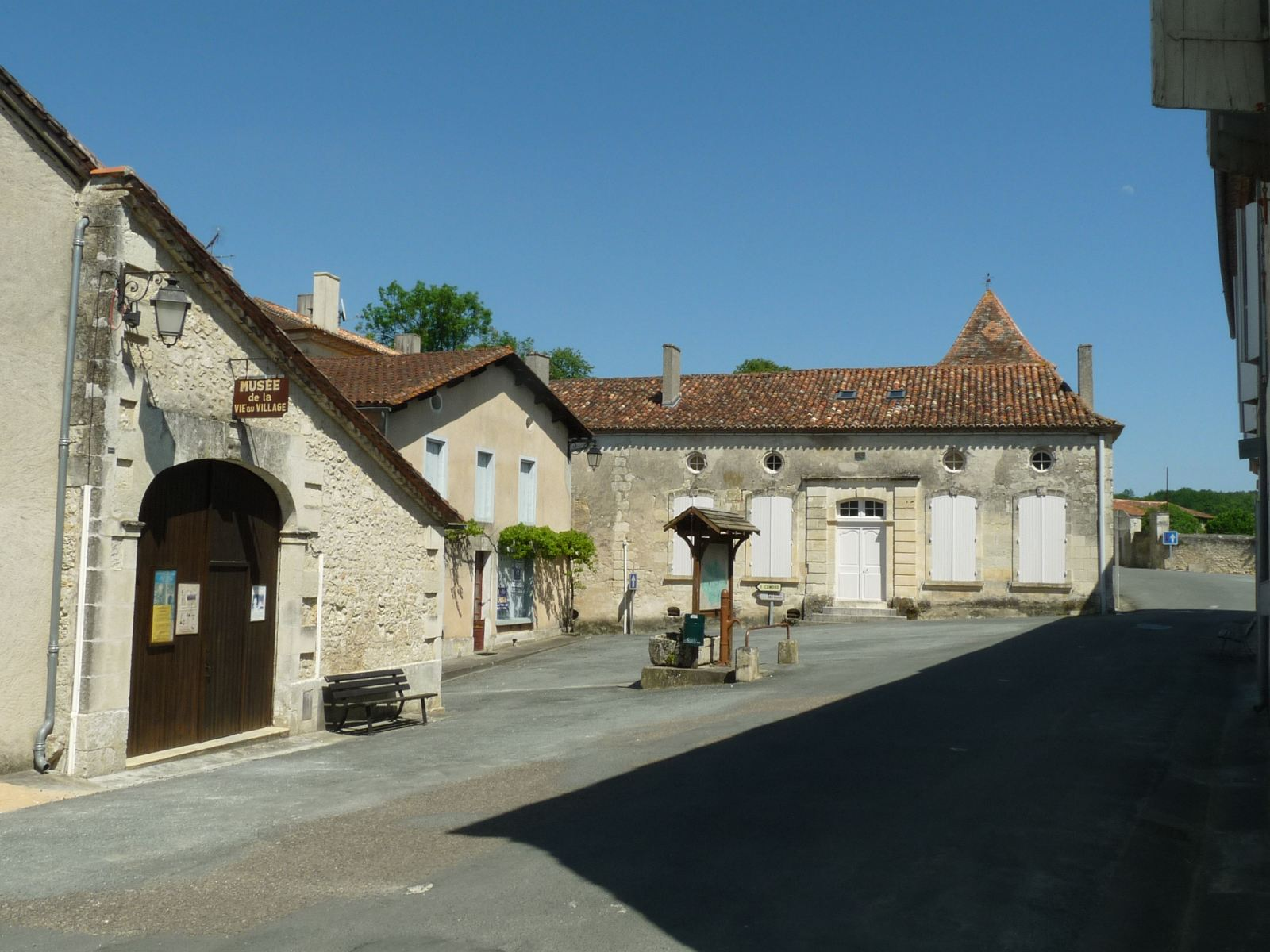

- Coat of arms
- Location of Saint-Privat-des-Prés
- Location within France Location within Nouvelle-Aquitaine
- Coordinates: 45°13′35″N 0°12′57″E
- Country: France
- Region: Nouvelle-Aquitaine
- Department: Dordogne
- Arrondissement: Périgueux
- Canton: Montpon-Ménestérol
- Commune: Saint Privat en Périgord
- Area^{1}: 19.63 km^{2} (7.58 sq mi)
- Elevation: 90 m (300 ft)
- Highest elevation: 132 m (433 ft)
- Lowest elevation: 35 m (115 ft)
- Population (2019): 524
  - Density: 26.7/km^{2} (69.1/sq mi)
- Time zone: UTC+01:00 (CET)
  - Summer (DST): UTC+02:00 (CEST)
- Postal code: 24410
- ^{1} French Land Register data, which excludes lakes, ponds, glaciers > 1 km^{2} (0.386 sq mi or 247 acres) and river estuaries.

Saint-Privat-des-Prés (French pronunciation: [sɛ̃ pʁiva de pʁe]; Occitan: Sent Privat daus Prats, before 1993: Saint-Privat) is a former commune in the Dordogne department in Nouvelle-Aquitaine in southwestern France. On 1 January 2017, it was merged into the new commune Saint Privat en Périgord. The operetta composer Pascal Bastia (1908–2007) died in Saint-Privat-des-Près.

== Population ==
Historical population
Year	Pop.	±% p.a.
1962	696	—
1968	671	−0.61%
1975	687	+0.34%
1982	702	+0.31%
1990	658	−0.81%
1999	619	−0.68%
2006	552	−1.62%
2019	524	−0.40%
Source: EHESS and INSEE

== See also ==
- Communes of the Dordogne department
