= Parcoul =

Commune in Dordogne, France

- Part of Parcoul-Chenaud
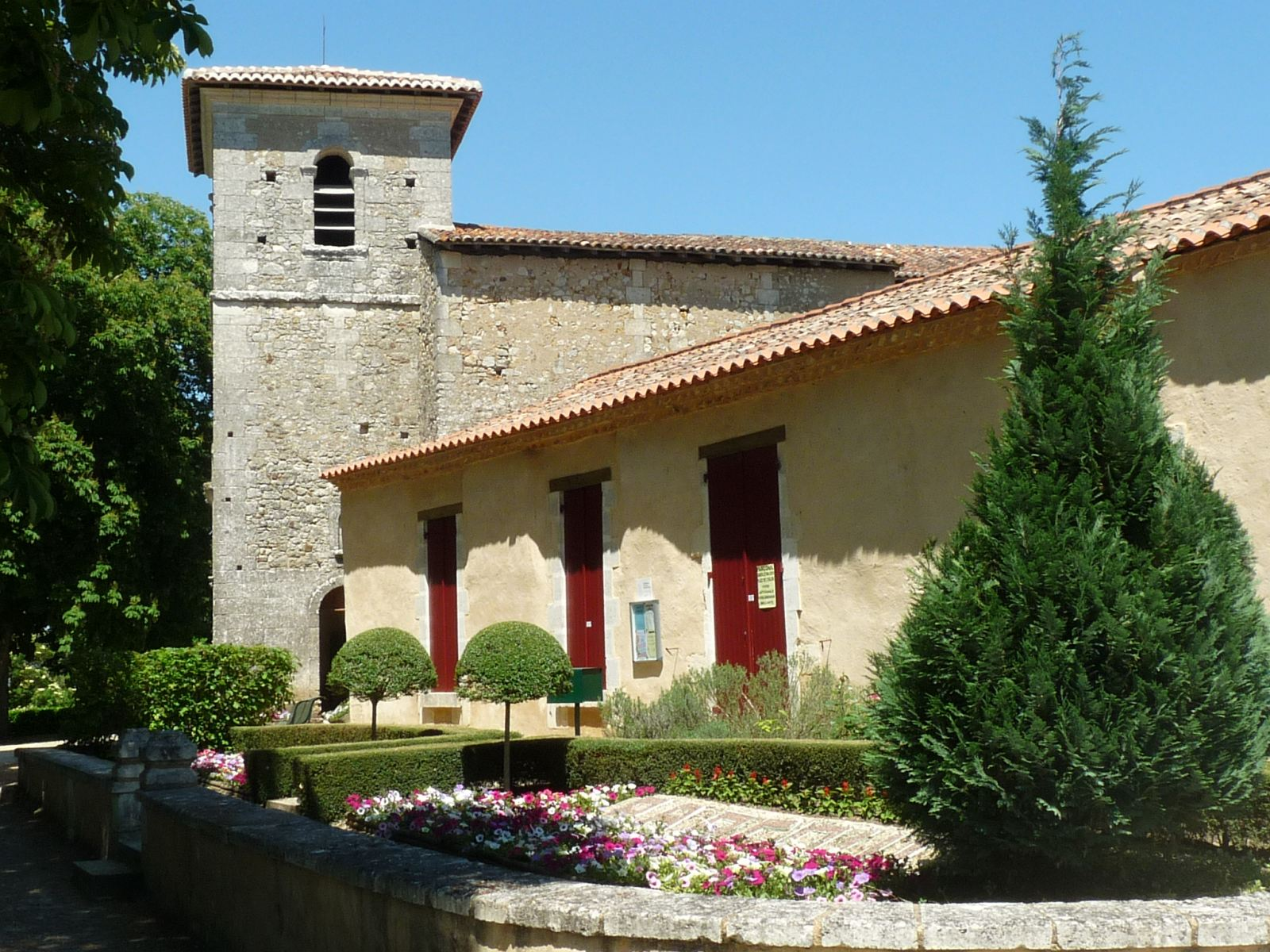
- Location of Parcoul
- Location within France Location within Nouvelle-Aquitaine
- Coordinates: 45°12′21″N 0°02′11″E
- Country: France
- Region: Nouvelle-Aquitaine
- Department: Dordogne
- Arrondissement: Périgueux
- Canton: Montpon-Ménestérol
- Commune: Parcoul-Chenaud
- Area^{1}: 14.17 km^{2} (5.47 sq mi)
- Elevation: 50 m (160 ft)
- Highest elevation: 109 m (358 ft)
- Lowest elevation: 22 m (72 ft)
- Population (2023): 441
  - Density: 31.1/km^{2} (80.6/sq mi)
- Time zone: UTC+01:00 (CET)
  - Summer (DST): UTC+02:00 (CEST)
- Postal code: 24410
- ^{1} French Land Register data, which excludes lakes, ponds, glaciers > 1 km^{2} (0.386 sq mi or 247 acres) and river estuaries.

Parcoul (French pronunciation: [paʁkul]) is a former commune in the Dordogne department in southwestern France. On 1 January 2016, it was merged into the new commune Parcoul-Chenaud.

== See also ==
- Communes of the Dordogne department
