= Moulin-Neuf =

Moulin-Neuf may refer to the following places in France:

- Moulin-Neuf, Ariège, a commune of the Ariège département
- Moulin-Neuf, Dordogne, a commune of the Dordogne département
