= Saint-Antoine-Cumond =

- Part of Saint Privat en Périgord
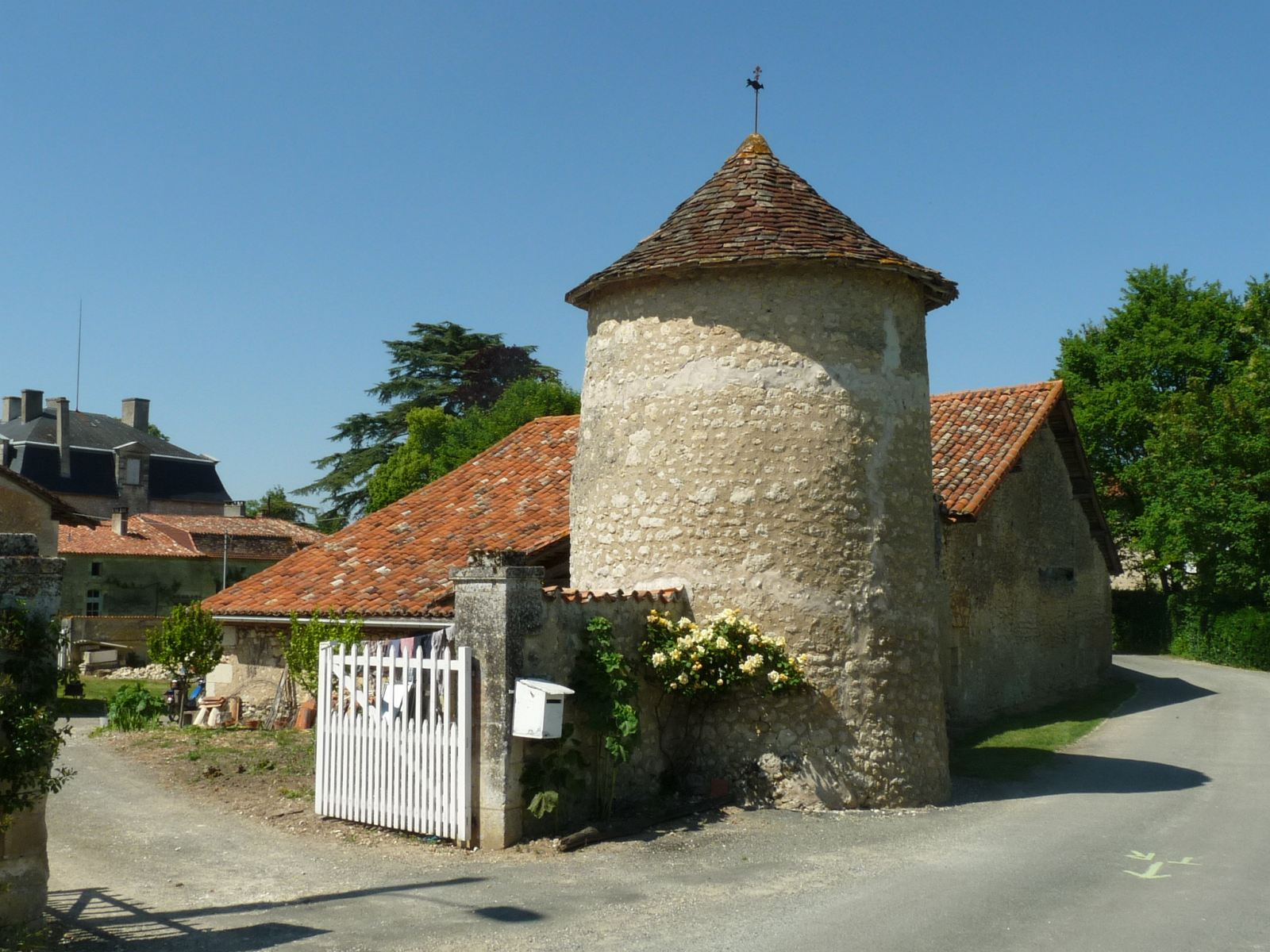

- Coat of arms
- Location of Saint-Antoine-Cumond
- Location within France Location within Nouvelle-Aquitaine
- Coordinates: 45°15′26″N 0°11′58″E
- Country: France
- Region: Nouvelle-Aquitaine
- Department: Dordogne
- Arrondissement: Périgueux
- Canton: Montpon-Ménestérol
- Commune: Saint Privat en Périgord
- Area^{1}: 12.14 km^{2} (4.69 sq mi)
- Elevation: 60 m (200 ft)
- Highest elevation: 124 m (407 ft)
- Lowest elevation: 40 m (130 ft)
- Population (2019): 344
  - Density: 28.3/km^{2} (73.4/sq mi)
- Time zone: UTC+01:00 (CET)
  - Summer (DST): UTC+02:00 (CEST)
- Postal code: 24410
- ^{1} French Land Register data, which excludes lakes, ponds, glaciers > 1 km^{2} (0.386 sq mi or 247 acres) and river estuaries.

Saint-Antoine-Cumond (French pronunciation: [sɛ̃.t‿ɑ̃twan kymɔ̃]; Occitan: Sent Antòni e Cucmont) is a former commune in the Dordogne department in Nouvelle-Aquitaine in southwestern France. On 1 January 2017, it was merged into the new commune Saint Privat en Périgord.

== See also ==
- Communes of the Dordogne department
