= Le Pizou =

- Commune
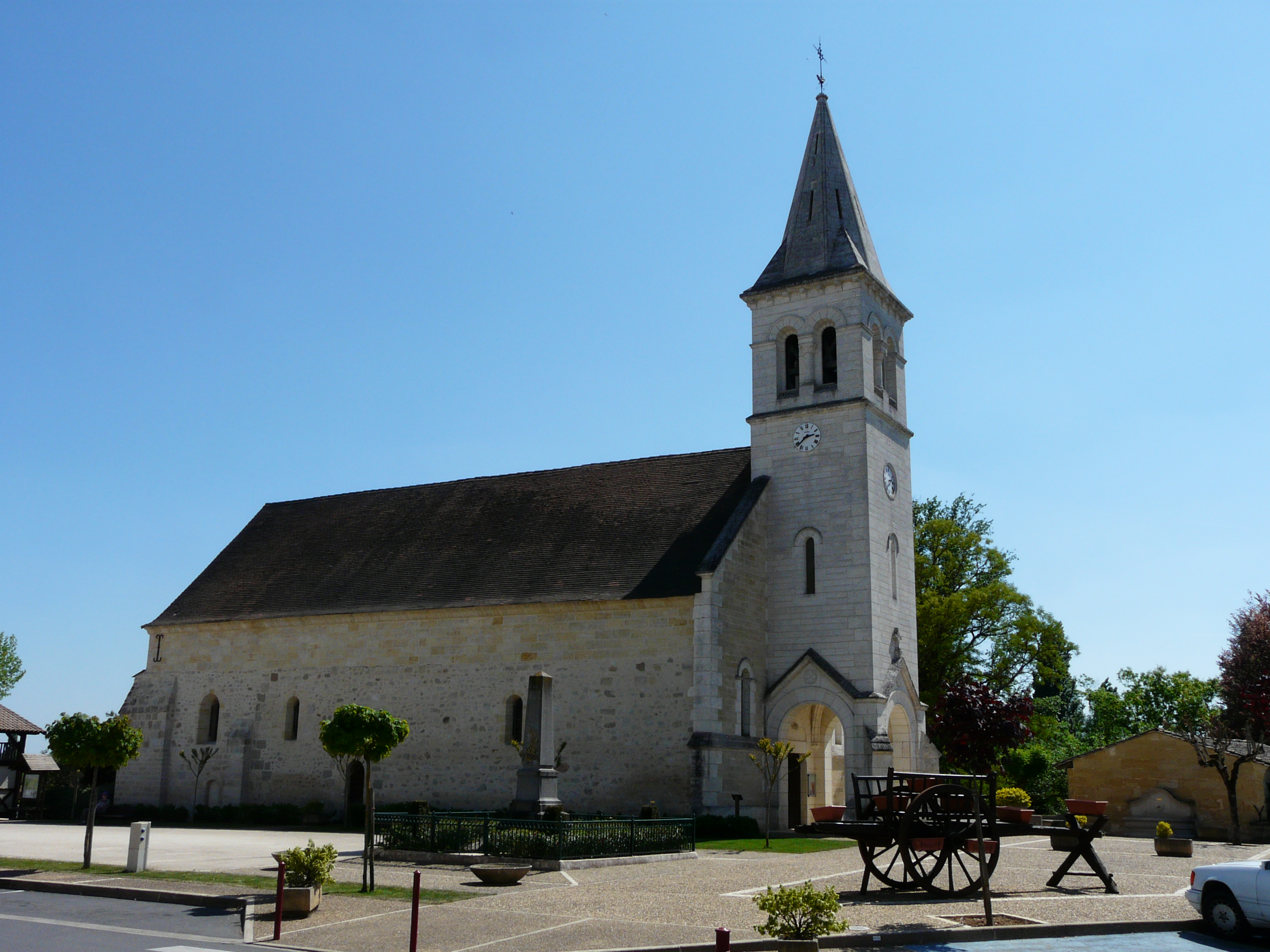
- The church in Le Pizou

- Coat of arms
- Location of Le Pizou
- Location within France Location within Nouvelle-Aquitaine
- Coordinates: 45°01′33″N 0°03′47″E
- Country: France
- Region: Nouvelle-Aquitaine
- Department: Dordogne
- Arrondissement: Périgueux
- Canton: Montpon-Ménestérol

Government
  - Mayor (2020–2026): Lionel Vergnaud
- Area^{1}: 17.02 km^{2} (6.57 sq mi)
- Elevation: 33 m (108 ft)
- Highest elevation: 102 m (335 ft)
- Lowest elevation: 19 m (62 ft)
- Population (2023): 1,428
  - Density: 83.90/km^{2} (217.3/sq mi)
- Time zone: UTC+01:00 (CET)
  - Summer (DST): UTC+02:00 (CEST)
- INSEE/Postal code: 24329 /24700
- ^{1} French Land Register data, which excludes lakes, ponds, glaciers > 1 km^{2} (0.386 sq mi or 247 acres) and river estuaries.

Le Pizou (French pronunciation: [lə pizu]; Occitan: Lo Pison) is a commune in the Dordogne department in Nouvelle-Aquitaine in southwestern France.

== Population ==
Historical population
Year	Pop.	±% p.a.
1968	1,037	—
1975	1,251	+2.72%
1982	1,255	+0.05%
1990	1,172	−0.85%
1999	1,094	−0.76%
2007	1,186	+1.01%
2012	1,293	+1.74%
2017	1,317	+0.37%
2023	1,428	+1.36%
Source: INSEE

== See also ==
- Communes of the Dordogne department
