= Saint-Barthélemy-de-Bellegarde =

- Commune
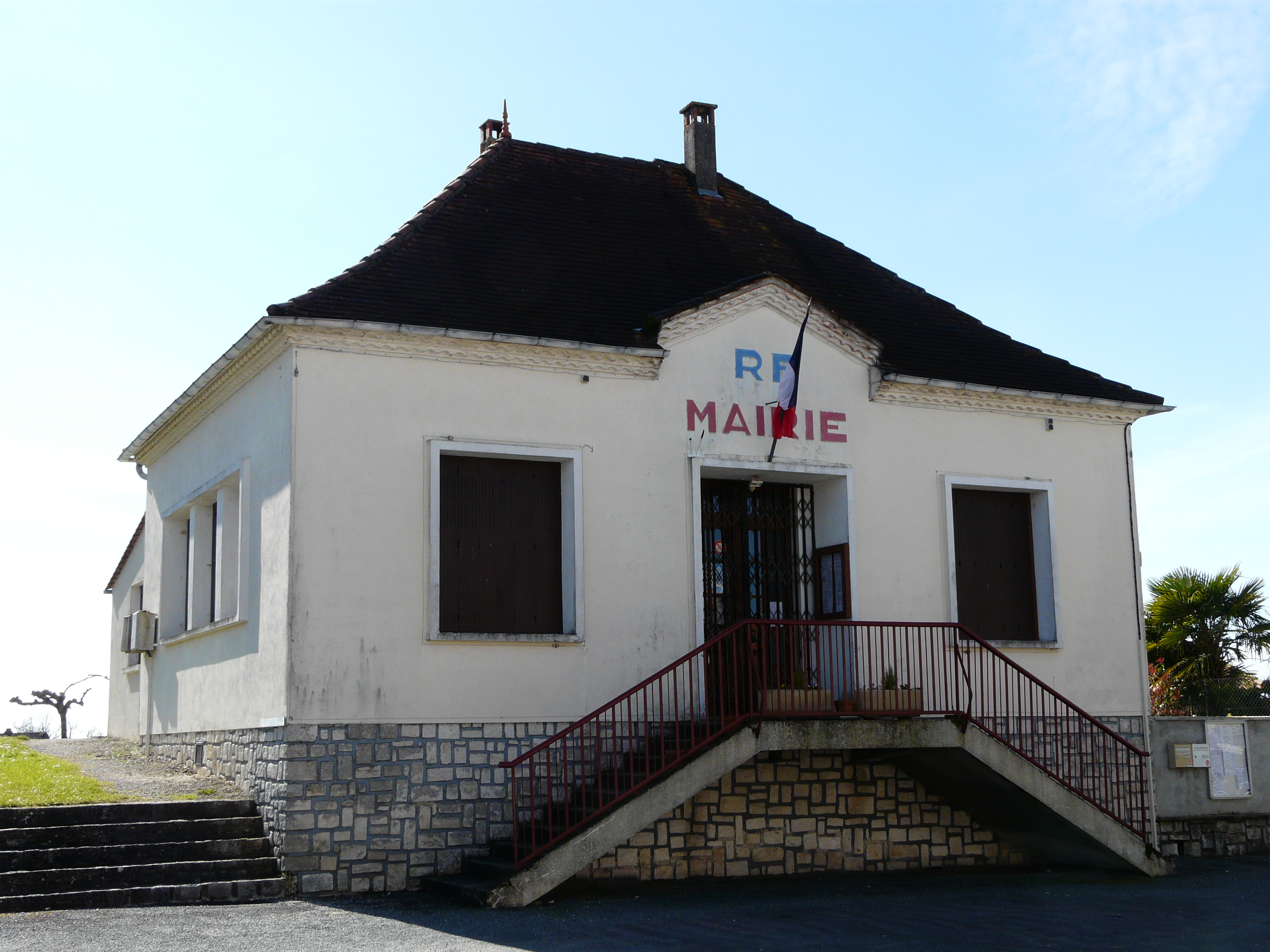
- The town hall in Saint-Barthélemy-de-Bellegarde
- Location of Saint-Barthélemy-de-Bellegarde
- Location within France Location within Nouvelle-Aquitaine
- Coordinates: 45°04′43″N 0°12′40″E
- Country: France
- Region: Nouvelle-Aquitaine
- Department: Dordogne
- Arrondissement: Périgueux
- Canton: Montpon-Ménestérol

Government
  - Mayor (2020–2026): Brigitte Cabirol
- Area^{1}: 33.12 km^{2} (12.79 sq mi)
- Elevation: 124 m (407 ft)
- Highest elevation: 126 m (413 ft)
- Lowest elevation: 42 m (138 ft)
- Population (2023): 507
  - Density: 15.3/km^{2} (39.6/sq mi)
- Time zone: UTC+01:00 (CET)
  - Summer (DST): UTC+02:00 (CEST)
- INSEE/Postal code: 24380 /24700
- ^{1} French Land Register data, which excludes lakes, ponds, glaciers > 1 km^{2} (0.386 sq mi or 247 acres) and river estuaries.

Saint-Barthélemy-de-Bellegarde (French pronunciation: [sɛ̃ baʁtelemi də bɛlɡaʁd]; Limousin: Sent Bertomiu de Belagarda) is a commune in the Dordogne department in Nouvelle-Aquitaine in southwestern France.

== Population ==
Historical population
Year	Pop.	±% p.a.
1968	372	—
1975	401	+1.08%
1982	451	+1.69%
1990	408	−1.24%
1999	464	+1.44%
2007	504	+1.04%
2012	517	+0.51%
2017	505	−0.47%
2023	507	+0.07%
Source: INSEE

== See also ==
- Communes of the Dordogne department
