= Servanches =

- Commune
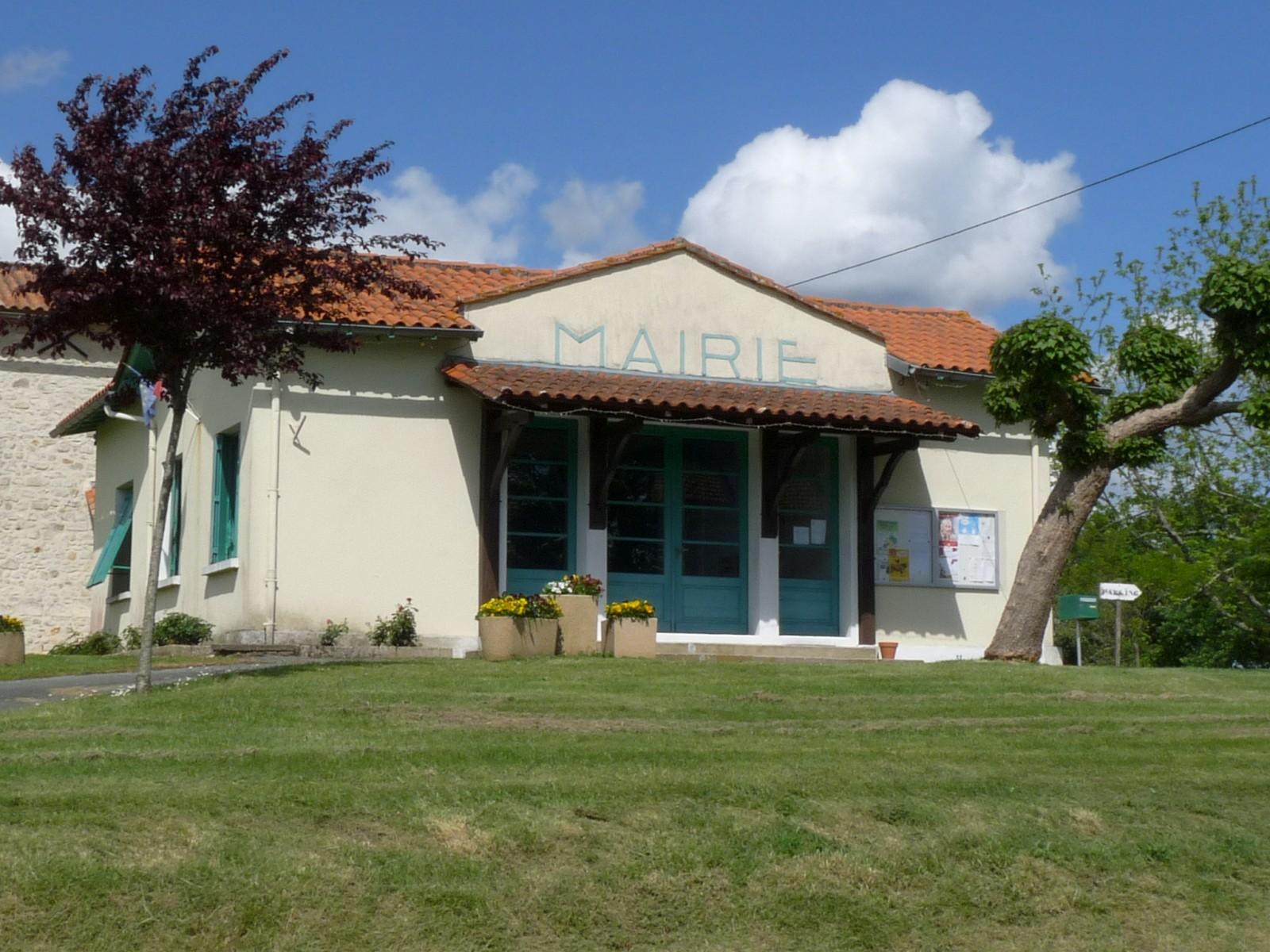
- The town hall in Servanches

- Coat of arms
- Location of Servanches
- Location within France Location within Nouvelle-Aquitaine
- Coordinates: 45°08′43″N 0°09′27″E
- Country: France
- Region: Nouvelle-Aquitaine
- Department: Dordogne
- Arrondissement: Périgueux
- Canton: Montpon-Ménestérol
- Intercommunality: Pays de Saint-Aulaye

Government
  - Mayor (2020–2026): Jean-Philippe Richard
- Area^{1}: 20.56 km^{2} (7.94 sq mi)
- Elevation: 121 m (397 ft)
- Highest elevation: 130 m (430 ft)
- Lowest elevation: 55 m (180 ft)
- Population (2023): 76
  - Density: 3.7/km^{2} (9.6/sq mi)
- Time zone: UTC+01:00 (CET)
  - Summer (DST): UTC+02:00 (CEST)
- INSEE/Postal code: 24533 /24410
- ^{1} French Land Register data, which excludes lakes, ponds, glaciers > 1 km^{2} (0.386 sq mi or 247 acres) and river estuaries.

Servanches (French pronunciation: [sɛʁvɑ̃ʃ]; Occitan: Servenchas) is a commune in the Dordogne department in Nouvelle-Aquitaine in southwestern France.

== Population ==
Historical population
Year	Pop.	±% p.a.
1968	143	—
1975	111	−3.55%
1982	105	−0.79%
1990	119	+1.58%
1999	103	−1.59%
2007	86	−2.23%
2012	89	+0.69%
2017	86	−0.68%
2023	76	−2.04%
Source: INSEE

== See also ==
- Communes of the Dordogne département
