= Saint-Vincent-Jalmoutiers =

- Commune
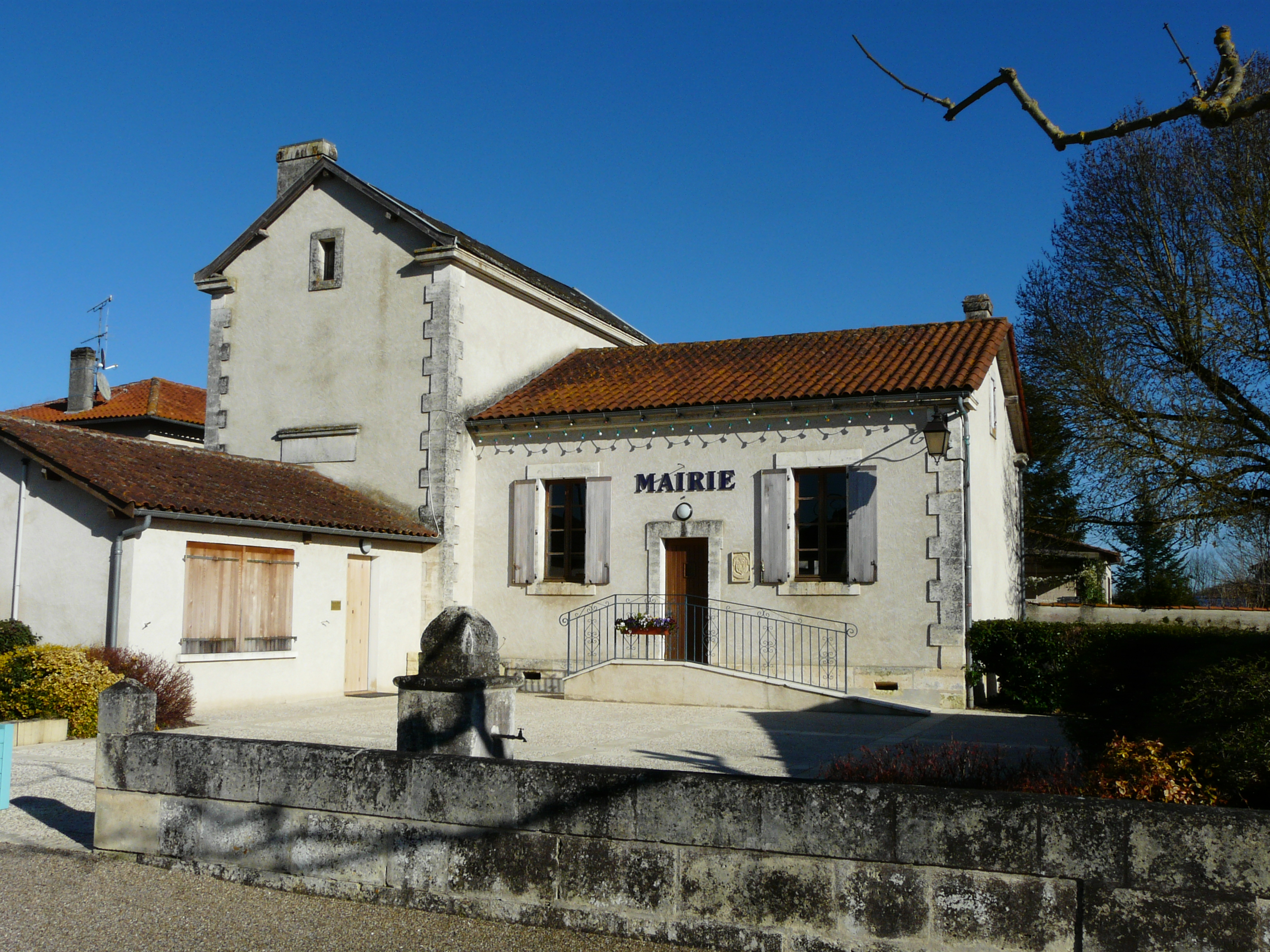
- The town hall in Saint-Vincent-Jalmoutiers

- Coat of arms
- Location of Saint-Vincent-Jalmoutiers
- Location within France Location within Nouvelle-Aquitaine
- Coordinates: 45°12′12″N 0°11′36″E
- Country: France
- Region: Nouvelle-Aquitaine
- Department: Dordogne
- Arrondissement: Périgueux
- Canton: Montpon-Ménestérol
- Intercommunality: Pays de Saint-Aulaye

Government
  - Mayor (2020–2026): Robert Denost
- Area^{1}: 16.21 km^{2} (6.26 sq mi)
- Elevation: 50 m (160 ft)
- Highest elevation: 133 m (436 ft)
- Lowest elevation: 42 m (138 ft)
- Population (2023): 202
  - Density: 12.5/km^{2} (32.3/sq mi)
- Time zone: UTC+01:00 (CET)
  - Summer (DST): UTC+02:00 (CEST)
- INSEE/Postal code: 24511 /24410
- ^{1} French Land Register data, which excludes lakes, ponds, glaciers > 1 km^{2} (0.386 sq mi or 247 acres) and river estuaries.

Saint-Vincent-Jalmoutiers (French pronunciation: [sɛ̃ vɛ̃sɑ̃ ʒalmutje]; Occitan: Sent Vincenç de Jaumostier) is a commune in the Dordogne department in Nouvelle-Aquitaine in southwestern France.

== Population ==
Historical population
Year	Pop.	±% p.a.
1968	243	—
1975	247	+0.23%
1982	236	−0.65%
1990	239	+0.16%
1999	213	−1.27%
2007	260	+2.52%
2012	242	−1.42%
2017	250	+0.65%
2023	202	−3.49%
Source: INSEE

== See also ==
- Communes of the Dordogne department
