= Saint-Martial-d'Artenset =

- Commune
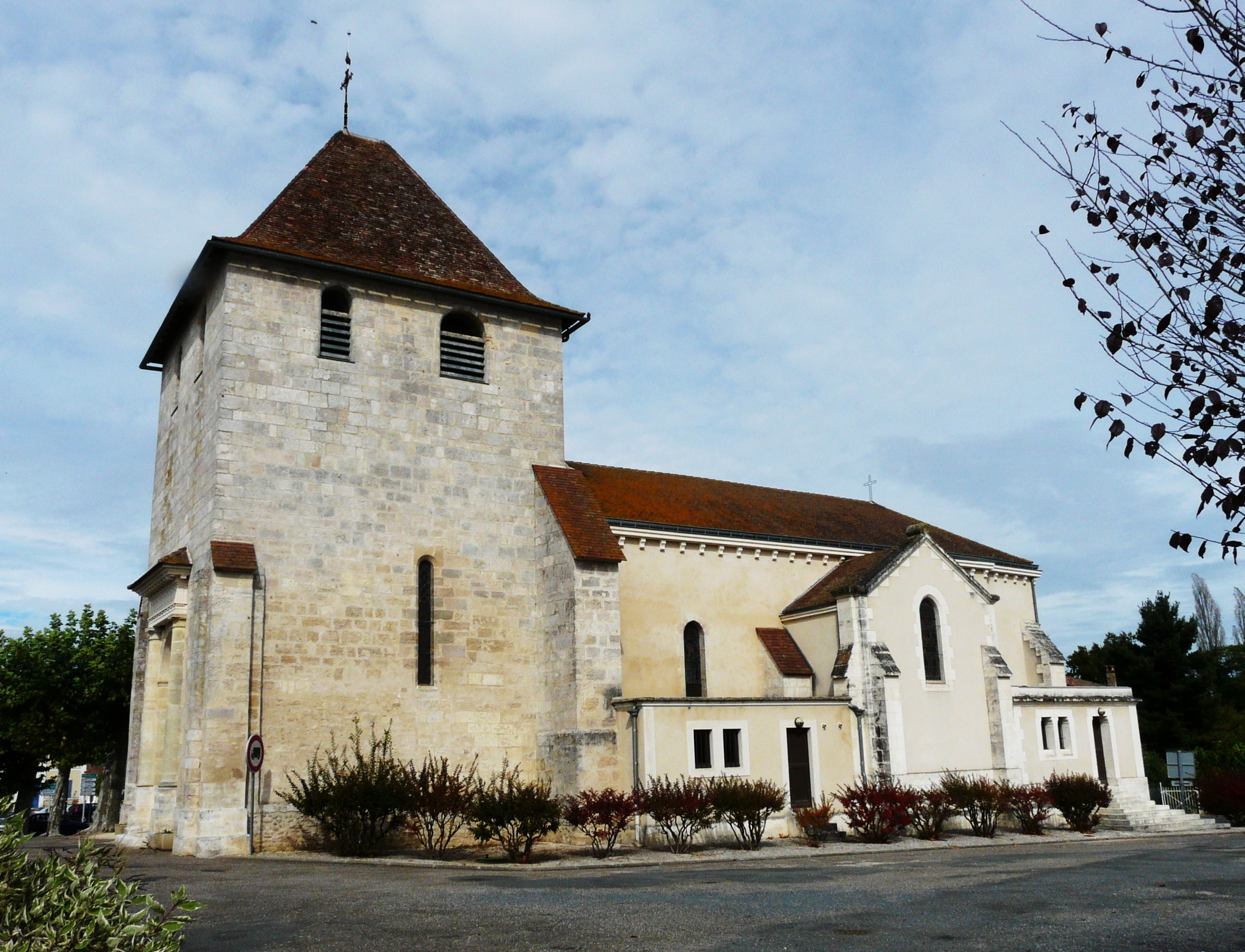
- The church in Saint-Martial-d'Artenset

- Coat of arms
- Location of Saint-Martial-d'Artenset
- Location within France Location within Nouvelle-Aquitaine
- Coordinates: 45°01′02″N 0°12′18″E
- Country: France
- Region: Nouvelle-Aquitaine
- Department: Dordogne
- Arrondissement: Périgueux
- Canton: Montpon-Ménestérol
- Intercommunality: Isle Double Landais

Government
  - Mayor (2020–2026): Dominique Leconte
- Area^{1}: 32.14 km^{2} (12.41 sq mi)
- Elevation: 48 m (157 ft)
- Highest elevation: 107 m (351 ft)
- Lowest elevation: 29 m (95 ft)
- Population (2023): 943
  - Density: 29.3/km^{2} (76.0/sq mi)
- Time zone: UTC+01:00 (CET)
  - Summer (DST): UTC+02:00 (CEST)
- INSEE/Postal code: 24449 /24700
- ^{1} French Land Register data, which excludes lakes, ponds, glaciers > 1 km^{2} (0.386 sq mi or 247 acres) and river estuaries.

Saint-Martial-d'Artenset (French pronunciation: [sɛ̃ maʁsjal daʁtɑ̃sɛ]; Occitan: Sent Marçau d'Artenset) is a commune in the Dordogne department in Nouvelle-Aquitaine in southwestern France.

== Population ==
Historical population
Year	Pop.	±% p.a.
1968	750	—
1975	716	−0.66%
1982	743	+0.53%
1990	839	+1.53%
1999	847	+0.11%
2007	940	+1.31%
2012	982	+0.88%
2017	955	−0.56%
2023	943	−0.21%
Source: INSEE

== See also ==
- Communes of the Dordogne department
