= Saint-Sauveur-Lalande =

- Commune
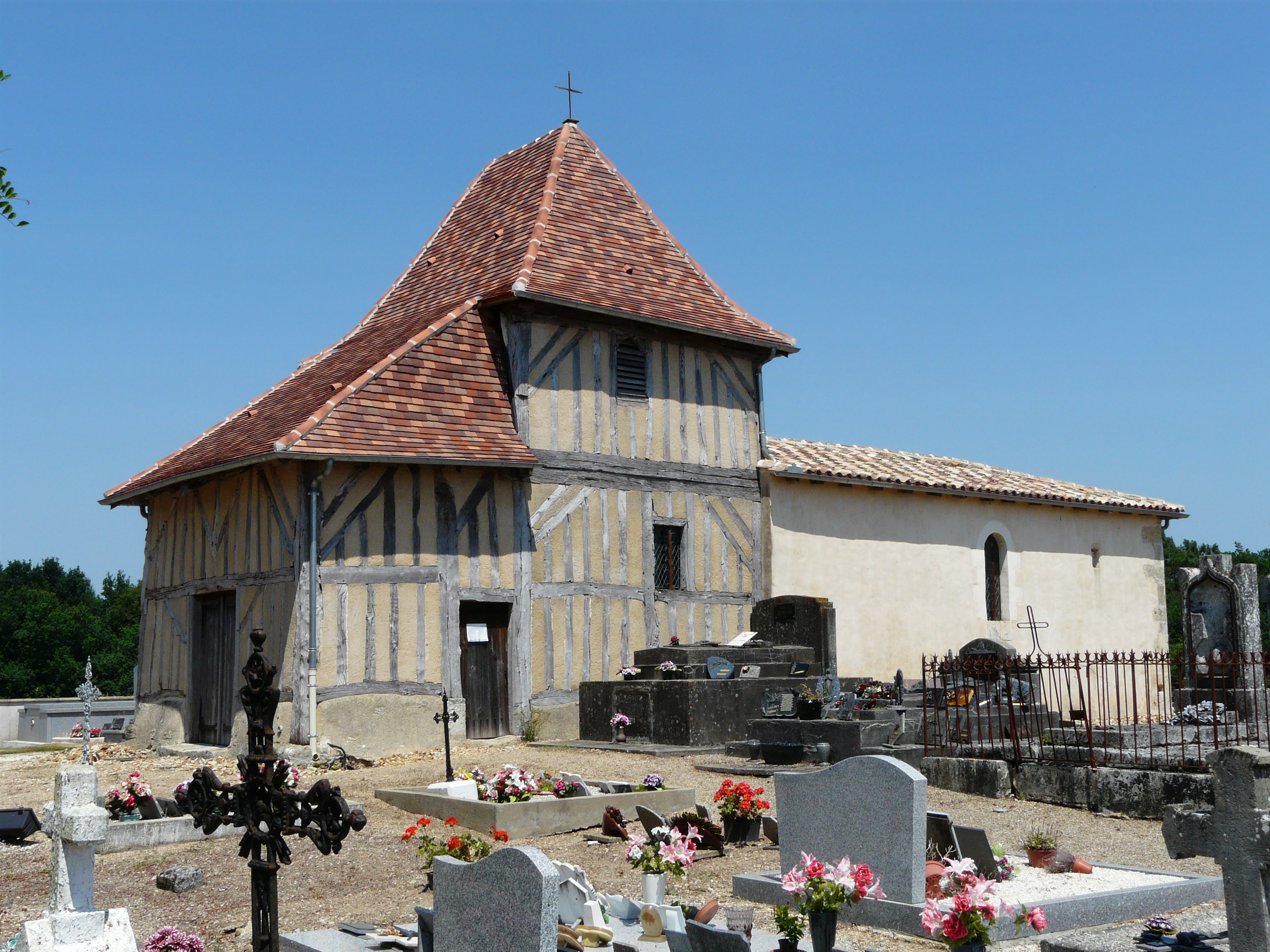
- The church in Saint-Sauveur-Lalande
- Location of Saint-Sauveur-Lalande
- Location within France Location within Nouvelle-Aquitaine
- Coordinates: 44°59′10″N 0°15′13″E
- Country: France
- Region: Nouvelle-Aquitaine
- Department: Dordogne
- Arrondissement: Périgueux
- Canton: Montpon-Ménestérol

Government
  - Mayor (2020–2026): Joël Jalarin
- Area^{1}: 9.30 km^{2} (3.59 sq mi)
- Elevation: 102 m (335 ft)
- Highest elevation: 118 m (387 ft)
- Lowest elevation: 53 m (174 ft)
- Population (2023): 149
  - Density: 16.0/km^{2} (41.5/sq mi)
- Time zone: UTC+01:00 (CET)
  - Summer (DST): UTC+02:00 (CEST)
- INSEE/Postal code: 24500 /24700
- ^{1} French Land Register data, which excludes lakes, ponds, glaciers > 1 km^{2} (0.386 sq mi or 247 acres) and river estuaries.

Saint-Sauveur-Lalande (pronounced [sɛ̃ sovœʁ lalɑ̃d]; Occitan: Sent Sauvador de la Landa) is a commune in the Dordogne department in Nouvelle-Aquitaine in southwestern France.

== Population ==
Historical population
Year	Pop.	±% p.a.
1968	146	—
1975	136	−1.01%
1982	121	−1.66%
1990	129	+0.80%
1999	116	−1.17%
2007	115	−0.11%
2012	142	+4.31%
2017	156	+1.90%
2023	149	−0.76%
Source: INSEE

== See also ==
- Communes of the Dordogne department
