= Ménesplet =

- Commune
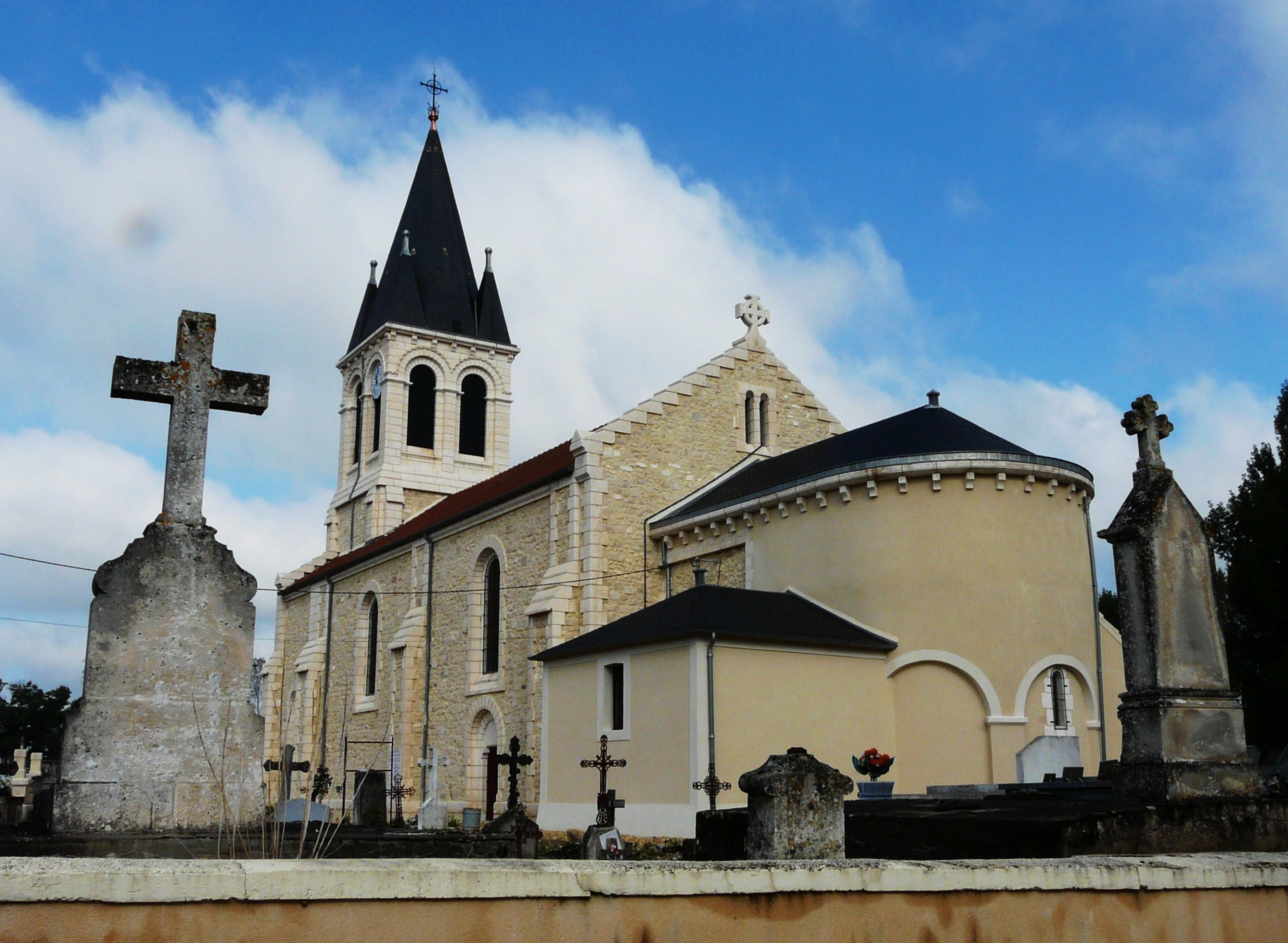
- The church in Ménesplet
- Location of Ménesplet
- Location within France Location within Nouvelle-Aquitaine
- Coordinates: 45°01′05″N 0°06′32″E
- Country: France
- Region: Nouvelle-Aquitaine
- Department: Dordogne
- Arrondissement: Périgueux
- Canton: Montpon-Ménestérol

Government
  - Mayor (2020–2026): Jean-Claude Chaussade
- Area^{1}: 18.91 km^{2} (7.30 sq mi)
- Elevation: 29 m (95 ft)
- Highest elevation: 86 m (282 ft)
- Lowest elevation: 22 m (72 ft)
- Population (2023): 1,928
  - Density: 102.0/km^{2} (264.1/sq mi)
- Time zone: UTC+01:00 (CET)
  - Summer (DST): UTC+02:00 (CEST)
- INSEE/Postal code: 24264 /24700
- ^{1} French Land Register data, which excludes lakes, ponds, glaciers > 1 km^{2} (0.386 sq mi or 247 acres) and river estuaries.

Ménesplet is a commune in the Dordogne department in Nouvelle-Aquitaine in southwestern France.

== Population ==
Historical population
Year	Pop.	±% p.a.
1968	956	—
1975	1,010	+0.79%
1982	1,211	+2.63%
1990	1,328	+1.16%
1999	1,289	−0.33%
2007	1,551	+2.34%
2012	1,726	+2.16%
2017	1,817	+1.03%
2023	1,928	+0.99%
Source: INSEE

== See also ==
- Communes of the Dordogne department
