= Eygurande-et-Gardedeuil =

- Commune
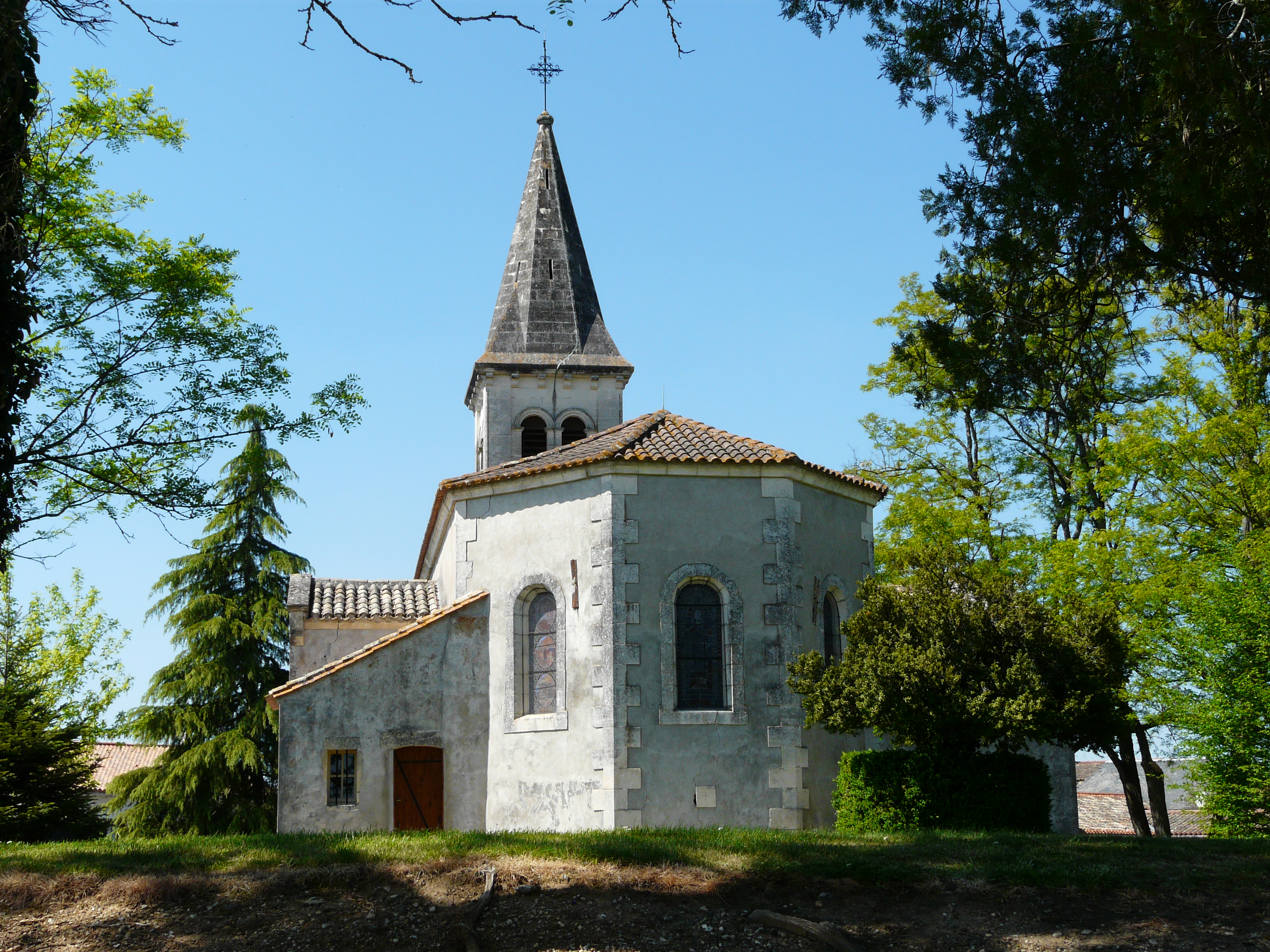
- The church in Eygurande-et-Gardedeuil

- Coat of arms
- Location of Eygurande-et-Gardedeuil
- Location within France Location within Nouvelle-Aquitaine
- Coordinates: 45°04′04″N 0°07′20″E
- Country: France
- Region: Nouvelle-Aquitaine
- Department: Dordogne
- Arrondissement: Périgueux
- Canton: Montpon-Ménestérol

Government
  - Mayor (2020–2026): Guy Piedfert
- Area^{1}: 35.62 km^{2} (13.75 sq mi)
- Elevation: 105 m (344 ft)
- Highest elevation: 115 m (377 ft)
- Lowest elevation: 28 m (92 ft)
- Population (2023): 402
  - Density: 11.3/km^{2} (29.2/sq mi)
- Time zone: UTC+01:00 (CET)
  - Summer (DST): UTC+02:00 (CEST)
- INSEE/Postal code: 24165 /24700
- ^{1} French Land Register data, which excludes lakes, ponds, glaciers > 1 km^{2} (0.386 sq mi or 247 acres) and river estuaries.

Eygurande-et-Gardedeuil (French pronunciation: [ɛɡyʁɑ̃d e ɡaʁdədœj]; Occitan: Eiguranda e Gardadelh) is a commune in the Dordogne department in Nouvelle-Aquitaine in southwestern France.

== Population ==
Historical population
Year	Pop.	±% p.a.
1968	423	—
1975	365	−2.08%
1982	310	−2.31%
1990	300	−0.41%
1999	296	−0.15%
2007	350	+2.12%
2012	391	+2.24%
2017	403	+0.61%
2023	402	−0.04%
Source: INSEE

== See also ==
- Communes of the Dordogne department
