= Saint Privat en Périgord =

- Commune
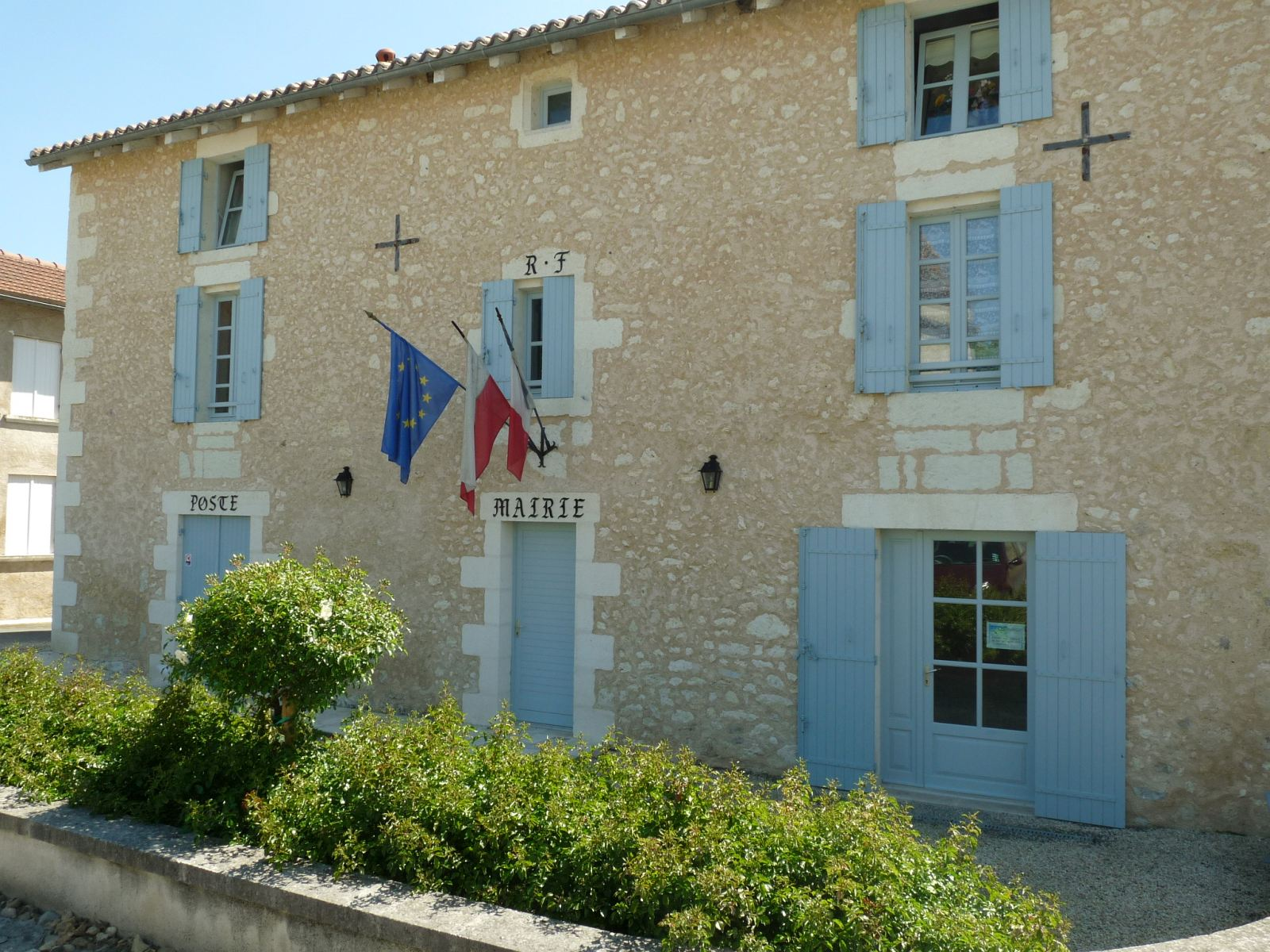
- The town hall in Saint Privat en Périgord
- Location of Saint Privat en Périgord
- Location within France Location within Nouvelle-Aquitaine
- Coordinates: 45°13′34″N 0°12′58″E
- Country: France
- Region: Nouvelle-Aquitaine
- Department: Dordogne
- Arrondissement: Périgueux
- Canton: Montpon-Ménestérol
- Intercommunality: Pays de Saint-Aulaye

Government
  - Mayor (2020–2026): Pascale Roussie-Nadal
- Area^{1}: 44.04 km^{2} (17.00 sq mi)
- Population (2023): 1,139
  - Density: 25.86/km^{2} (66.98/sq mi)
- Time zone: UTC+01:00 (CET)
  - Summer (DST): UTC+02:00 (CEST)
- INSEE/Postal code: 24490 /24410
- ^{1} French Land Register data, which excludes lakes, ponds, glaciers > 1 km^{2} (0.386 sq mi or 247 acres) and river estuaries.

Saint Privat en Périgord (French pronunciation: [sɛ̃ pʁiva ɑ̃ peʁiɡɔʁ], literally Saint Privat in Périgord; Occitan: Sent Privat de Perigòrd) is a commune in the department of Dordogne, southwestern France. The municipality was established on 1 January 2017 by merger of the former communes of Saint-Privat-des-Prés (the seat), Festalemps and Saint-Antoine-Cumond.

== See also ==
- Communes of the Dordogne department
