= Saint-Aulaye =

Commune in Dordogne, France

- Part of Saint-Aulaye-Puymangou
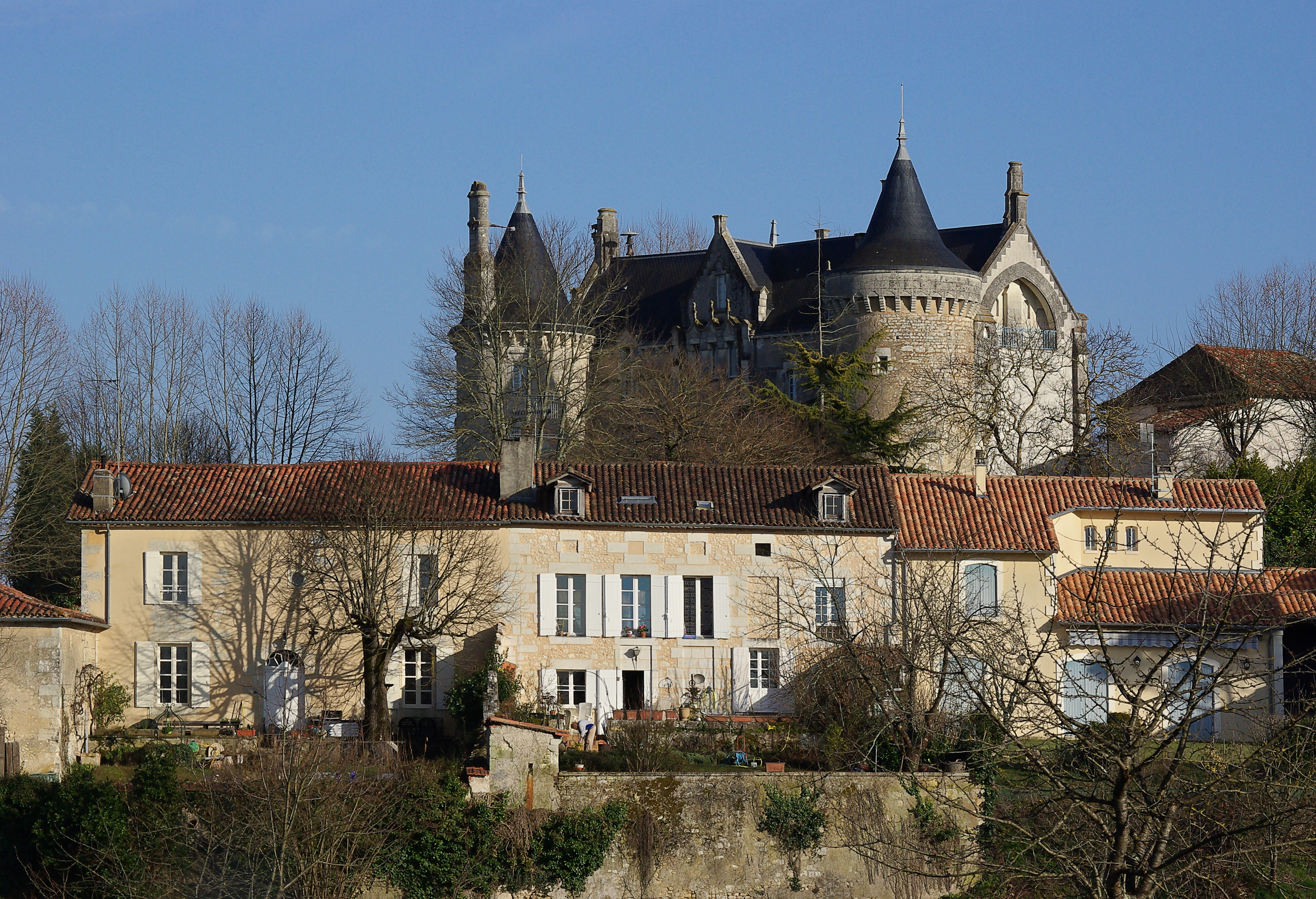
- The castle seen from the west

- Coat of arms
- Location of Saint-Aulaye
- Location within France Location within Nouvelle-Aquitaine
- Coordinates: 45°12′11″N 0°08′06″E
- Country: France
- Region: Nouvelle-Aquitaine
- Department: Dordogne
- Arrondissement: Périgueux
- Canton: Montpon-Ménestérol
- Commune: Saint-Aulaye-Puymangou
- Area^{1}: 34.71 km^{2} (13.40 sq mi)
- Elevation: 76 m (249 ft)
- Highest elevation: 132 m (433 ft)
- Lowest elevation: 32 m (105 ft)
- Population (2022): 1,355
  - Density: 39.04/km^{2} (101.1/sq mi)
- Time zone: UTC+01:00 (CET)
  - Summer (DST): UTC+02:00 (CEST)
- Postal code: 24410
- ^{1} French Land Register data, which excludes lakes, ponds, glaciers > 1 km^{2} (0.386 sq mi or 247 acres) and river estuaries.

Saint-Aulaye (French pronunciation: [sɛ̃.t‿olɛ]; Occitan: Senta Aulaia) is a former commune in Dordogne, France. On 1 January 2016, it was merged into the new commune Saint-Aulaye-Puymangou. Jeanne Baret, the first woman to travel round the world, retired to Saint-Aulaye, where she died in 1807.

== Population ==
Historical population

Year	Pop.	±% p.a.
1793	1,130	—
1800	1,064	−0.86%
1806	1,235	+2.52%
1821	1,400	+0.84%
1831	1,437	+0.26%
1836	1,440	+0.04%
1841	1,397	−0.60%
1846	1,480	+1.16%
1851	1,518	+0.51%
1856	1,519	+0.01%
1861	1,524	+0.07%
1866	1,532	+0.10%
1872	1,451	−0.90%
1876	1,481	+0.51%
1881	1,518	+0.49%
1886	1,510	−0.11%
1891	1,464	−0.62%

Year	Pop.	±% p.a.
1896	1,531	+0.90%
1901	1,525	−0.08%
1906	1,610	+1.09%
1911	1,634	+0.30%
1921	1,399	−1.54%
1926	1,435	+0.51%
1931	1,443	+0.11%
1936	1,211	−3.44%
1946	1,248	+0.30%
1954	1,352	+1.01%
1962	1,356	+0.04%
1968	1,379	+0.28%
1975	1,398	+0.20%
1982	1,524	+1.24%
1990	1,531	+0.06%
1999	1,399	−1.00%
2022	1,355	−0.14%

Source: EHESS and INSEE

== See also ==
- Communes of the Dordogne department
