= Parcoul-Chenaud =

- Commune
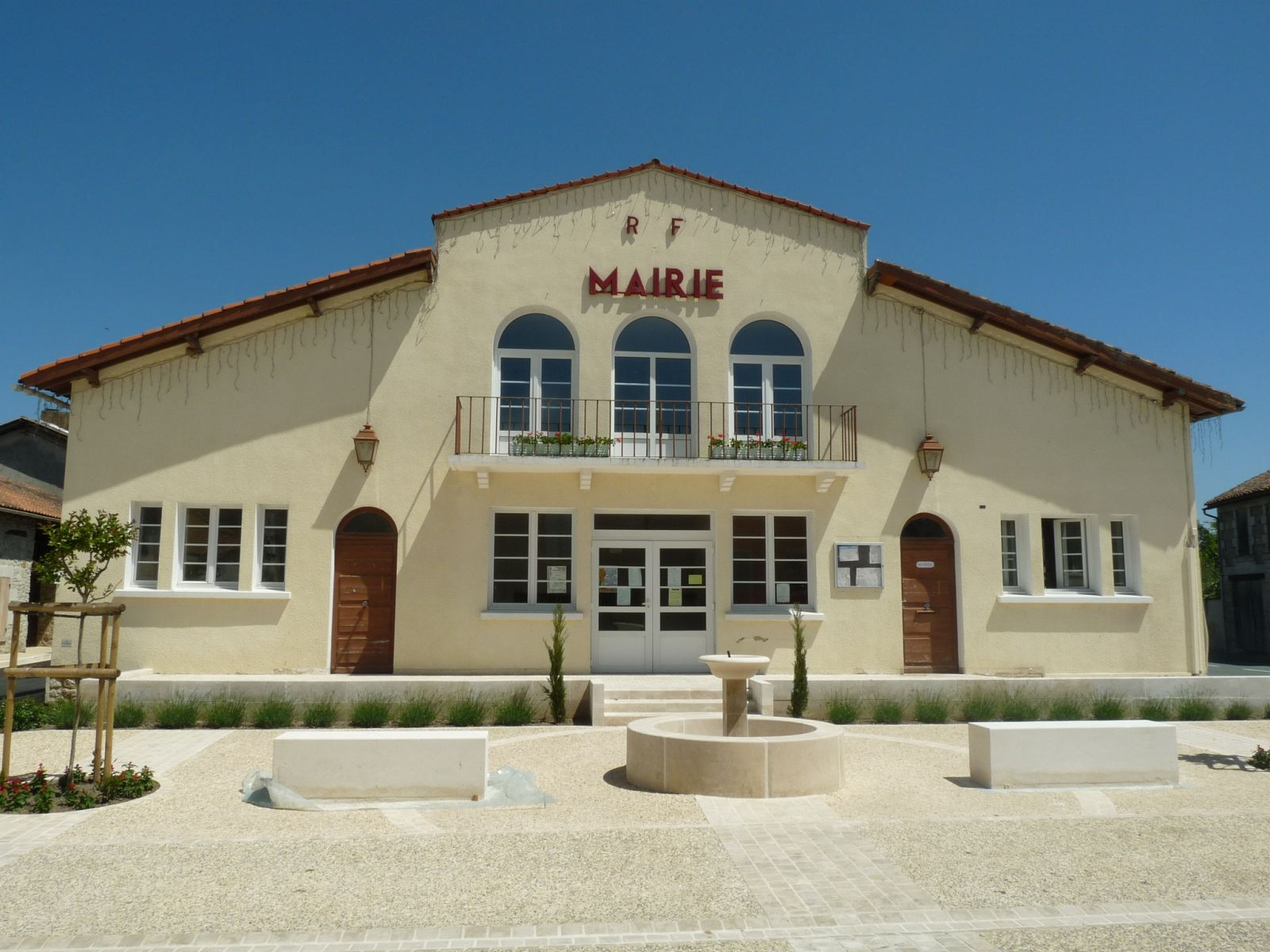
- The town hall in Parcoul
- Location of Parcoul-Chenaud
- Location within France Location within Nouvelle-Aquitaine
- Coordinates: 45°12′18″N 0°02′06″E
- Country: France
- Region: Nouvelle-Aquitaine
- Department: Dordogne
- Arrondissement: Périgueux
- Canton: Montpon-Ménestérol

Government
  - Mayor (2020–2026): Jean-Jacques Gendreau
- Area^{1}: 26.75 km^{2} (10.33 sq mi)
- Population (2023): 800
  - Density: 30/km^{2} (77/sq mi)
- Time zone: UTC+01:00 (CET)
  - Summer (DST): UTC+02:00 (CEST)
- INSEE/Postal code: 24316 /24410
- ^{1} French Land Register data, which excludes lakes, ponds, glaciers > 1 km^{2} (0.386 sq mi or 247 acres) and river estuaries.

Parcoul-Chenaud (French pronunciation: [paʁkul ʃəno]; Occitan: Parcol e Chanaur) is a commune in the Dordogne department of southwestern France. The municipality was established on 1 January 2016 and consists of the former communes of Parcoul and Chenaud.

== See also ==
- Communes of the Dordogne department
