= Moulin-Neuf, Dordogne =

Moulin-Neuf
- Commune
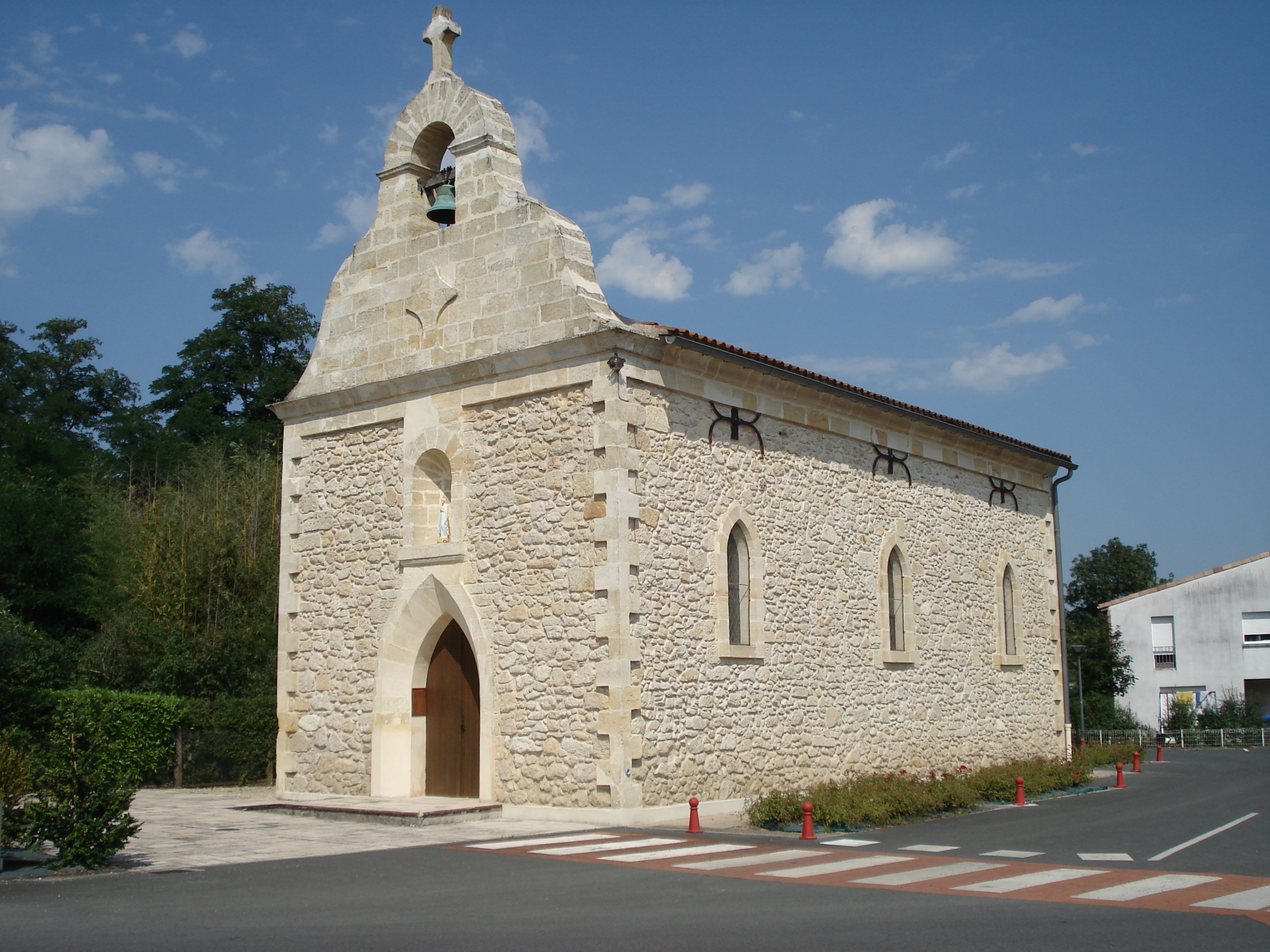
- The church in Moulin-Neuf

- Coat of arms
- Location of Moulin-Neuf
- Location within France Location within Nouvelle-Aquitaine
- Coordinates: 45°00′42″N 0°03′06″E
- Country: France
- Region: Nouvelle-Aquitaine
- Department: Dordogne
- Arrondissement: Périgueux
- Canton: Montpon-Ménestérol

Government
  - Mayor (2020–2026): Georges Elizabeth
- Area^{1}: 8.62 km^{2} (3.33 sq mi)
- Elevation: 25 m (82 ft)
- Highest elevation: 67 m (220 ft)
- Lowest elevation: 18 m (59 ft)
- Population (2023): 986
  - Density: 114/km^{2} (296/sq mi)
- Time zone: UTC+01:00 (CET)
  - Summer (DST): UTC+02:00 (CEST)
- INSEE/Postal code: 24297 /24700
- ^{1} French Land Register data, which excludes lakes, ponds, glaciers > 1 km^{2} (0.386 sq mi or 247 acres) and river estuaries.

Moulin-Neuf (French pronunciation: [mulɛ̃ nœf]; Occitan: Molin Nuòu) is a commune in the Dordogne department in Nouvelle-Aquitaine in southwestern France. It is about 50 km northeast of Bordeaux.

== Population ==
Historical population
Year	Pop.	±% p.a.
1968	517	—
1975	507	−0.28%
1982	569	+1.66%
1990	664	+1.95%
1999	703	+0.64%
2007	840	+2.25%
2012	895	+1.28%
2017	926	+0.68%
2023	986	+1.05%
Source: INSEE

== See also ==
- Communes of the Dordogne department
