= Saint-Aulaye-Puymangou =

- Commune
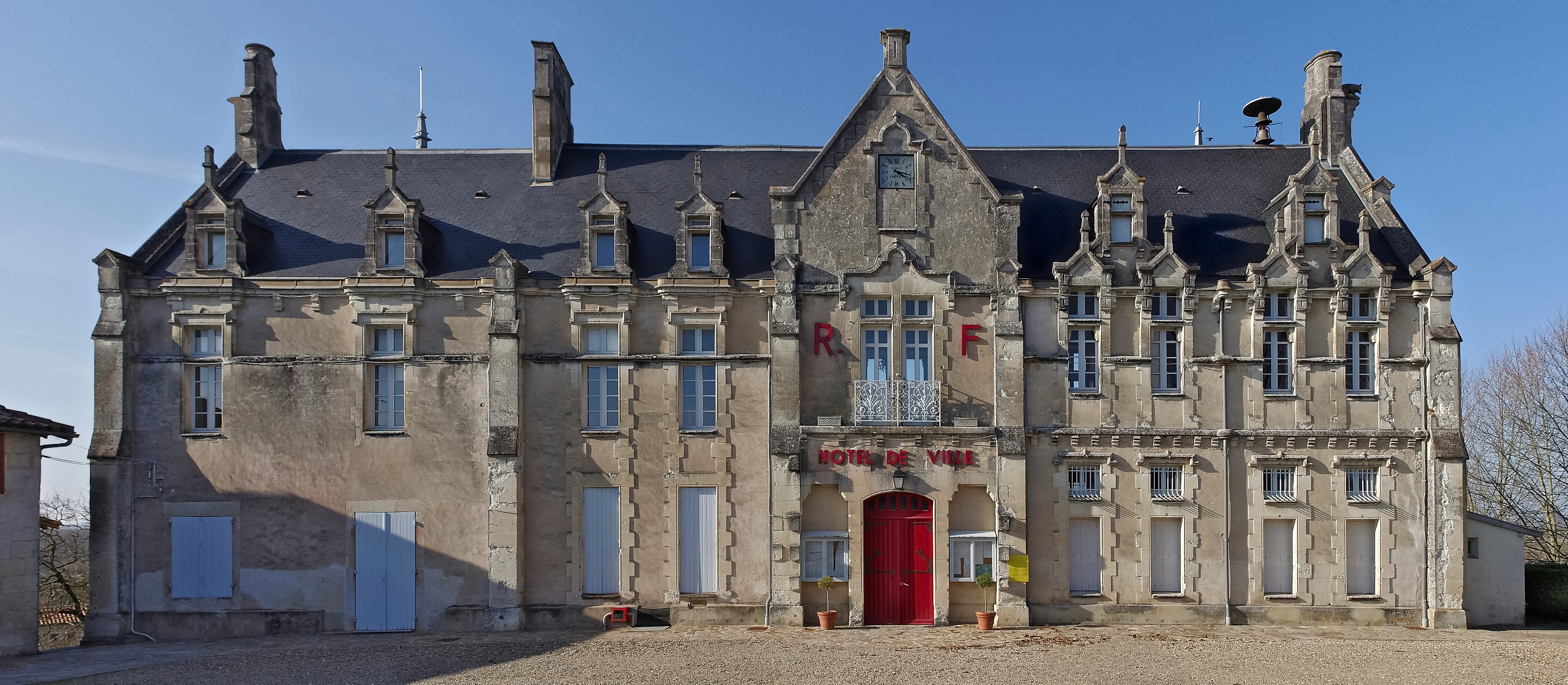
- The town hall in Saint-Aulaye-Puymangou
- Location of Saint-Aulaye-Puymangou
- Location within France Location within Nouvelle-Aquitaine
- Coordinates: 45°12′14″N 0°08′17″E
- Country: France
- Region: Nouvelle-Aquitaine
- Department: Dordogne
- Arrondissement: Périgueux
- Canton: Montpon-Ménestérol

Government
  - Mayor (2020–2026): Yannick Lagrenaudie
- Area^{1}: 46.00 km^{2} (17.76 sq mi)
- Population (2023): 1,450
  - Density: 31.5/km^{2} (81.6/sq mi)
- Time zone: UTC+01:00 (CET)
  - Summer (DST): UTC+02:00 (CEST)
- INSEE/Postal code: 24376 /24410
- ^{1} French Land Register data, which excludes lakes, ponds, glaciers > 1 km^{2} (0.386 sq mi or 247 acres) and river estuaries.

Saint-Aulaye-Puymangou (French pronunciation: [sɛ̃.t‿olɛ pɥimɑ̃ɡu]; Occitan: Senta Aulaia e Pueimangor) is a commune in the Dordogne department of southwestern France. The municipality was established on 1 January 2016 and consists of the former communes of Saint-Aulaye and Puymangou.

== See also ==
- Communes of the Dordogne department
