= Canton of Montpon-Ménestérol =

Canton in France

Coordinates: 45.01°N 0.16°E

The canton of Montpon-Ménestérol is an administrative division of the Dordogne department, southwestern France. Its borders were modified at the French canton reorganisation which came into effect in March 2015. Its seat is in Montpon-Ménestérol.

It consists of the following communes:

1. Échourgnac
2. Eygurande-et-Gardedeuil
3. Ménesplet
4. Montpon-Ménestérol
5. Moulin-Neuf
6. Parcoul-Chenaud
7. Le Pizou
8. La Roche-Chalais
9. Saint-Aulaye-Puymangou
10. Saint-Barthélemy-de-Bellegarde
11. Saint-Martial-d'Artenset
12. Saint Privat en Périgord
13. Saint-Sauveur-Lalande
14. Saint-Vincent-Jalmoutiers
15. Servanches
