= Curial =

Curial may refer to:

- one of the Curiales, a social class in ancient Rome
- anything related to the Roman Curia
- anything related to a royal court
- a title character of Curial e Güelfa
- Napoléon Joseph Curial (1809–1861), French peer and politician
- Philibert Jean-Baptiste Curial (1774–1829), general in the French army during the Napoleonic Wars
