= Félix Chadenet =

French lawyer, civil servant and politician

Félix Jean-Baptiste Chadenet
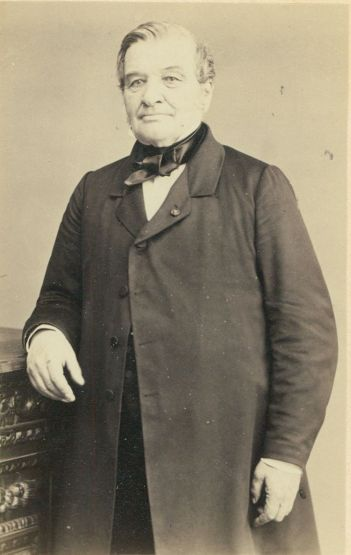
- Chadenet in 1864 by "Franck" (François Gobinet de Villecholle)

Representative of Meuse
- In office 13 May 1849 – 2 December 1851

Representative of Meuse
- In office 31 May 1863 – 4 September 1870

Personal details
- Born: 7 April 1798 Verdun, Meuse, France
- Died: 24 September 1874 (aged 76) Damvillers, Meuse, France
- Occupation: Lawyer and politician

Félix Jean-Baptiste Chadenet (7 April 1798 – 24 September 1874) was a French lawyer, civil servant and politician who twice represented the department of Meuse in the legislature. He had right wing views and supported Prince Louis-Napoleon (Napoleon III) before and after the 1851 coup that established the Second French Empire.

== Early years (1798–1848) ==
Félix Jean-Baptiste Chadenet was born on 7 April 1798 in Verdun, Meuse. His parents were Jean Baptiste Chadenet (1771–1848) and Marie Boudet (1778–1856). He studied law in Paris, and became a lawyer in Verdun during the Bourbon Restoration. He married Marie Françoise Hebert (born 1805). Their children included Baron Henri Chadenet (1828–1908) and Baron Félix Chadenet (1831–1922). Félix Chadenet belonged to the liberal opposition to the regime, which triumphed in the July Revolution of 1830. He became bâtonnier of the Verdun bar, and a member of the Meuse General Council.

== Second Republic (1848–51) ==
After the February Revolution of 1848 Chadenet was elected to represent Meuse in the Constituent Assembly. Chadenet was Representative of Meuse from 23 April 1848 to 26 May 1849. He joined the Right majority, and was a member of the Committee on Departmental and Communal Administration. He voted for restoration of physical constraint, for the prosecution of Louis Blanc and Marc Caussidière, for the state of siege, against abolition of the death penalty, against the Jules Grévy amendment, against the right to work and against reduction of the salt tax.

Chadenet fully supported Louis-Napoleon Bonaparte after his election as President of France in December 1848. Chadenet was absent during the 12 January 1849 vote on the Rateau proposal to bring the operation of the Constituent Assembly to an end, but a ballot paper with his name was found in the ballot box. He wrote to the editor of the official Moniteur saying that he had been sick at home on 12 January, but the ballot paper perfectly expressed his will.

Chadenet was reelected Representative of Meuse in the National Legislative Assembly on 13 May 1849, and again sat with the Right group. He continued to give his full support to Bonaparte. He voted with the leaders of the Right, and voted for the law of 31 May restricting universal suffrage. When a struggle began between the president and the royalist majority he confirmed his support for Bonaparte. He held office until the coup d'état of 2 December 1851.

== Second Empire (1851–70) ==
After the coup d'état Chadenet entered the administration and was appointed Master of Requests in extraordinary service. He represented Charny in the Meuse General Council, and from 1851 to 1852 was president of the General Council. He was then in succession prefect of Tarn-et-Garonne (4 March 1853), Loir-et-Cher (30 March 1853), Meuse (21 June 1854), Charente (26 November 1856) and Yonne (10 April 1861). Chadenet retired as prefect on 4 August 1862. He ran as official candidate for Representative of Meuse in the Corps législatif on 31 May 1863, and was elected on 1 June 1863 by 11,290 votes out of 22,513. He voted with the dynastic majority. He was appointed Commander of the Legion of Honour in 1868. He was reelected on 23 May 1869, and again sat with the dynastic majority.

== Final years (1870–74) ==
Chadenet left office with the fall of the empire on 4 September 1870. He died on 24 September 1874 in the château de Mureau, Damvillers, Meuse.

== Publications ==
Chadenet was the author of many reports as a member of the National Assembly. They include:

- Félix Chadenet (16 July 1850), Rapport... (Organisation cantonale) (Assemblée législative. 1850. Impressions. T. XIX. N°1227), Paris: impr. de l'Assemblée nationale, p. 66
- Félix Chadenet (8 January 1851), Rapport... (Dessèchements) (Assemblée législative. 1850-1851. Impressions. T. XXII. N°1528), Paris: impr. de l'Assemblée nationale, p. 12
- Félix Chadenet (18 May 1863), Le Pénitencier de Naumoncel, commune de Senon, canton de Spincourt, Meuse... (Extrait du "Courrier de Verdun"), Verdun: impr. de Lallemant, p. 17

== Sources ==
- Félix Chadenet (1798-1874) (in French), BnF: Bibliotheque nationale de France
- Félix, Jean-Baptiste Chadenet (in French), Assemblée nationale
- Ganzin, Gaetan, Felix Jean Baptiste Chadenet (in French)
- Les Présidents du Conseil Général (in French), Département de la Meuse
- Robert, Adolphe; Cougny, Gaston (1889–1891), "Chadenet, Félix Jean-Baptiste", in Edgar Bourloton (ed.), Dictionnaire des Parlementaires français (1789–1889) (in French)
