= Fresneau =

Fresneau is a surname. Notable people with the surname include:

- Armand Fresneau (1823–1900), French politician
- François Fresneau de La Gataudière (1703–1770), French botanist and scientist
- Jehan Fresneau (fl. c. 1468–1505), French composer of the Renaissance
