= Seze =

Seze may be,

- Seze language
- Aurélien de Sèze
- Raymond Desèze
