= François Joseph Ducoux =

French politician

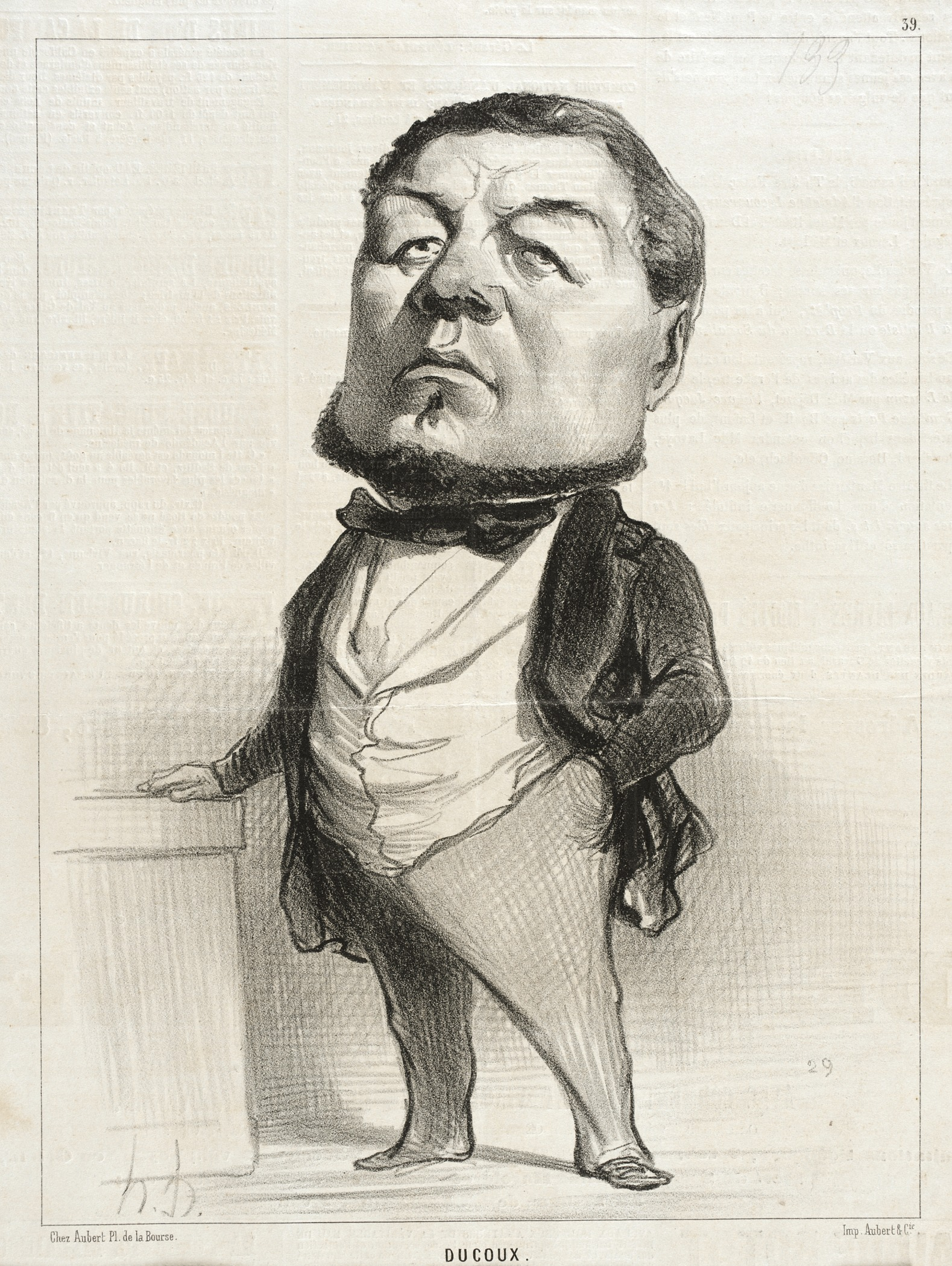
- Ducoux in 1849 by Honoré Daumier

Representative of Loir-et-Cher
- In office 23 April 1848 – 26 May 1849

Prefect of Paris Police
- In office 19 July 1848 – 14 October 1848
- Preceded by: Ariste Jacques Trouvé-Chauvel
- Succeeded by: Guillaume François Gervais

Representative of Haute-Vienne
- In office 10 March 1850 – 2 December 1851

Representative of Loir-et-Cher
- In office 8 February 1871 – 23 March 1873

Personal details
- Born: 11 September 1808 Châteauponsac, Haute-Vienne, France
- Died: 23 March 1873 (aged 64) Paris, France
- Occupation: Physician, businessman, politician

François Joseph Ducoux (11 September 1808 – 23 March 1873) was a French medical doctor, left-wing politician and businessman. He served as a military physician from 1828 to 1838 before settling in Blois and engaging in local politics. He was a representative in the National Assembly during the French Second Republic, and as Prefect of the Paris Police helped restore order after the bloody June Days uprising. He introduced legislation to establish the Bourse du Travail (labour exchange), but this was rejected. He left politics during the Second French Empire, but was again a representative in the National Assembly in the first years of the French Third Republic.

== Life ==
=== Early years (1808–48) ===
François Joseph Ducoux was born on 11 September 1808 in Châteauponsac, Haute-Vienne. He studied medicine in Paris and was among the most enthusiastic of the liberal youth in the Latin Quarter under the Bourbon Restoration. He wrote a poem that attacked the Jesuits, Epitre, signed with his initials, The 12-page poem was published in 1826 and received some attention.

After qualifying as a doctor Ducoux practiced in Paris before engaging as a Naval Medical Officer in June 1828. He campaigned in the West Indies and Brazil. After two years he returned to Brest with the rest of the fleet. In 1831 he was assigned to Africa, where he remained until 1837. He was assistant surgeon to the 4th Line Regiment in Africa, then for political reasons was transferred to the 55th Line Regiment, which he joined in Bône at the height of an epidemic.

Ducoux resigned from the army in 1838 and settled in Blois. He practiced there as a physician. He was made commander of the National Guard, municipal councilor and president of the Masonic lodge. He was a member of the Société des sciences et lettres de Blois.

=== Second Republic (1848–51) ===
After the February Revolution of 1848 Ducoux was made Commissioner of the Provisional Government in Blois. He was elected Representative of Loir-et-Cher in the Constituent Assembly from 23 April 1848 to 26 May 1849. He sometimes spoke in the Assembly, particularly during the debate over abrogating the article of the law of 10 April 1832 that banished members of the Bonaparte family from France. He said, "The Bonaparte family has only historical value, it is no more than the glorious tradition from a time that no one would have the folly to repeat."

Ducoux was appointed Prefect of Police on 19 July 1848 by the government of General Louis-Eugène Cavaignac after the June Days uprising in which there were a thousand deaths, including six generals and the Archbishop of Paris. He replaced Ariste Jacques Trouvé-Chauvel, who had been appointed Prefect of the Seine. He helped restore order and had many people arrested. He held this position until 14 October 1848. He resigned in disgust after Cavaignac reshuffled his cabinet and admitted former monarchists, calling the new ministry, "the personification of the counter-revolution."

Ducoux was a member of the Agriculture Committee. In the Assembly he voted for banishment of the Orleans family, for the law on gatherings, for the decree on clubs, for the agenda in favor of General Cavaignac, for abolition of the salt tax, for release of the transported, against the Jules Grévy amendment, against the right to work, against the Rateau proposal, against the prohibition of clubs, against the return of the defendants of 15 May to the High Court and against credits for the expedition of Rome.

Ducoux abstained from the votes on the prosecution of Louis Blanc and Marc Caussidière, on the death penalty and on the proposal for a general amnesty. During the 25 August 1848 debate on the complicity of the deputies Blanc and Caussidière in the May uprising both men slipped out of the chamber without being observed. Both reached England without difficulty. It was said that Docuoux as Prefect of Police let them escape, but if so he was not disciplined. It seems that Cavaignac had allowed them to go, having achieved his goal of discrediting the Republicans.

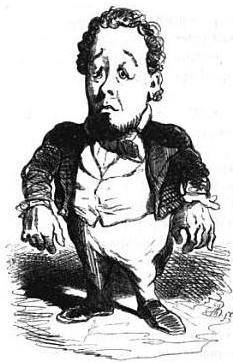
Ducoux by Cham (Amédée de Noé) in 1850

On 8 July 1849 Ducoux failed to be elected to the Legislative Assembly, winning only 2,009 votes against 14,647 for Justinien Nicolas Clary and 13,537 for the runner-up. On 10 March 1850 he was elected to the Legislative Assembly for Haute-Vienne by 29,619 votes against the Bonapartist candidate. He consistently voted with the Left against the policy of the Elysée. The idea of creating a Labour Exchange (Bourse du travail) is credited to the economist Gustave de Molinari in 1845. In February 1851 Ducoux submitted a bill to the Legislative Assembly that proposed to establish a state-run Labour Exchange in Paris. His project was also submitted to the Paris Municipal Commission. The project was abandoned, but later revived in 1875 and 1883 and eventually came into force in 1886.

=== Second Empire (1851–70) ===
After the coup d'état of 2 December 1851 Ducoux was arrested and held in custody for a short period. During the Second French Empire he generally stayed out of politics and was director of the Compagnie des Petites Voitures (Small Cab Company). On 13 May 1864 Ducoux communicated to the British court of patents that a French patent had been granted to Michael Henry for improvement in apparatus for time and distance indicators and tell-tales for vehicles. In the legislative election of 24 May 1869 he ran for election for the 1st district of Haute Vienne, but won only 1,793 votes against 16,141 for Armand Noualhier, who was elected. He also ran in the same election for the 2nd district of Loir-et-Cher and won 11,631 votes against 18,683 for the elected candidate, François-Philibert Dessaignes.

=== Third Republic (1870–73) ===
During the French Third Republic Ducoux was Representative of Loir-et-Cher in the National Assembly from 8 February 1871 to 23 March 1873. He sat on the left, and voted against public prayers, against the constituent power of the Assembly, for the return of the Assembly from Versailles to Paris and for the declaration by Adolphe Thiers on 13 November 1872 that the Republic was the legal and inevitable government of France. Ducoux died on 23 March 1873 in Paris.

== Publications ==
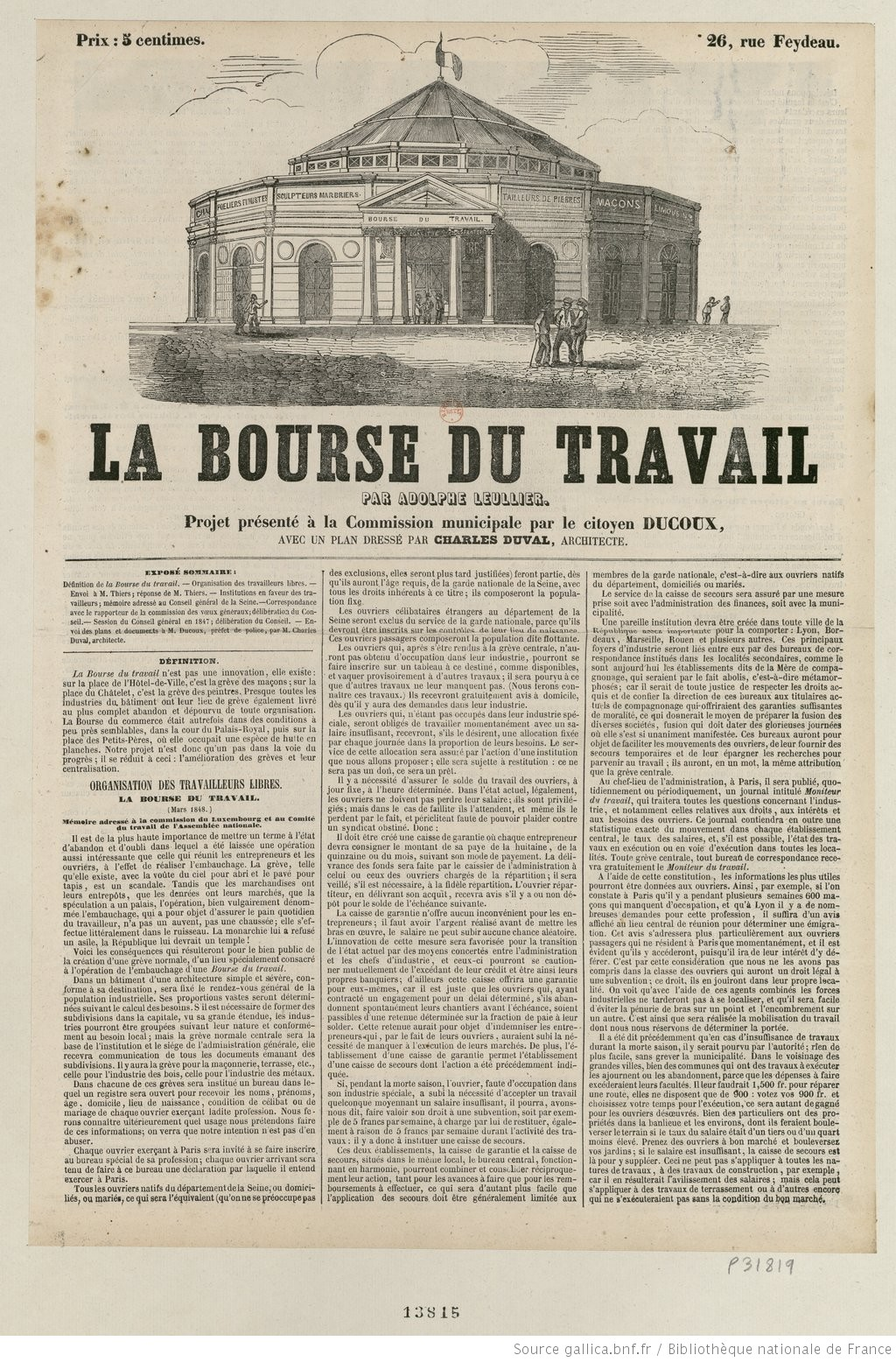
La Bourse du Travail (1851)

Publications by François-Joseph Ducoux include:

- François-Joseph Ducoux (25 July 1834), Considérations générales sur l'influence morale, Montpellier
- —— (1837), Esquisse des maladies épidémiques du nord de l'Afrique; suivi de Considérations hygiéniques applicables à l'armée d'occupation examen des causes qui les ont occasionnées et entretenues, Paris: librairies médicales et militaires, p. 56
- —— (1838), Éloge historique de Denis Papin, de Blois, inventeur des machines et des bateaux à vapeur, Blois: Prévost, p. 76
- —— (1847), Notice sur les eaux minérales naturelles de Cransac, département de l'Aveyron eaux ferro-manganésiennes et calcaréo-magnésiennes, sulfatées (2 ed.), Paris: librairies médicales, p. 78
- —— (1848), Catéchisme républicain, ou Manuel du peuple, Sèvres: impr. de Cerf, p. 24
- —— (1 July 1848), Proclamation au sujet du désarmement, Belleville: impr. de Galban
- —— (11 July 1848), Proclamation aux habitants de La Chapelle-Saint-Denis pour le rétablissement de l'ordre, Belleville: impr. de Galban
- —— (11 July 1848), Arrêté pour la nomination d'une commission municipale à La Chapelle, Belleville: impr. de Galban
- —— (11 July 1848), Arrêté relatif aux secours aux indigents, Belleville: impr. de Galban
- —— (18 August 1848), Proclamation aux habitants de Paris sur l'état de Paris et les effets rassurants du rétablissement de l'ordre, Paris: impr. de Boucquin
- —— (20 September 1848), Proclamation aux habitants de Paris sur l'état de Paris après les élections partielles, Paris: impr. de Boucquin
- —— (1849), Guide de l'électeur républicain, Paris: Impr. de E. Proux / France. Assemblée législative
- —— (3 February 1851), Proposition relative à la construction d'une bourse des travailleurs (Assemblée législative. 1851. Impressions. T. XXIV. N°1617), Paris: Impr. de l'Assemblée nationale, p. 2
- ——; Charles Duval (1851), La Bourse du Travail (Wood engraving by Adolphe Leullier)
- ——; M. Bannistère (1854), Notice sur Denis Papin, inventeur des machines et des bateaux à vapeur (2 ed.), Blois: H. Morard, p. 112
- —— (August 1856), Alimentation de Paris. État de la question des marchés à bestiaux de Paris., Paris: impr. de Maulde et Renou, p. 37
- —— (1859), Notice sur la Compagnie impériale des voitures de Paris, depuis son origine jusqu'à nos jours, Paris: impr. de P.-A. Bourdier, p. 86
- —— (1869), A Messieurs les électeurs de la 1re circonscription électorale de la Haute-Vienne, Limoges

== Sources ==
- Chereau, Achille (1874), Le parnasse médical français: ou, Dictionnaire des médecins-poètes de la France, anciens ou modernes, morts ou vivants ..., Delahaye
- François, Joseph Ducoux (in French), Assemblée nationale
- François-Joseph Ducoux (1808-1873) (in French), BnF: Bibliotheque nationale de France
- Luna, Frederick A. De (2015-12-08), The French Republic under Cavaignac, 1848, Princeton University Press, ISBN 978-1-4008-7980-9
- Mead, Christopher Curtis; Baltard, Victor (2012), Making Modern Paris: Victor Baltard's Central Markets and the Urban Practice of Architecture, University of Pennsylvania Press, ISBN 978-0-271-05087-4
- Notice bibliographique : La Bourse du Travail (in French), BnF: Bibliotheque nationale de France
- Notice biographique François Ducoux (in French), SFHP: Société Française d'Histoire de la Police
- "Portrait de François-Joseph Ducoux", Joconde (in French)
- Ribeyre, Félix (1872), "Ducoux (François Joseph)", Biographie des représentants à l'Assemblée nationale (in French), E. Lachaud
- Robert, Adolphe; Cougny, Gaston (1889–1891), "Ducoux, François Joseph", in Edgar Bourloton (ed.), Dictionnaire des Parlementaires français (1789–1889) (in French)
- Woodcroft, B. (1866), Subject-matter index of patents applied for and patents granted, Commissioners of Patents
