= Indiana (novel) =

1832 novel by George Sand

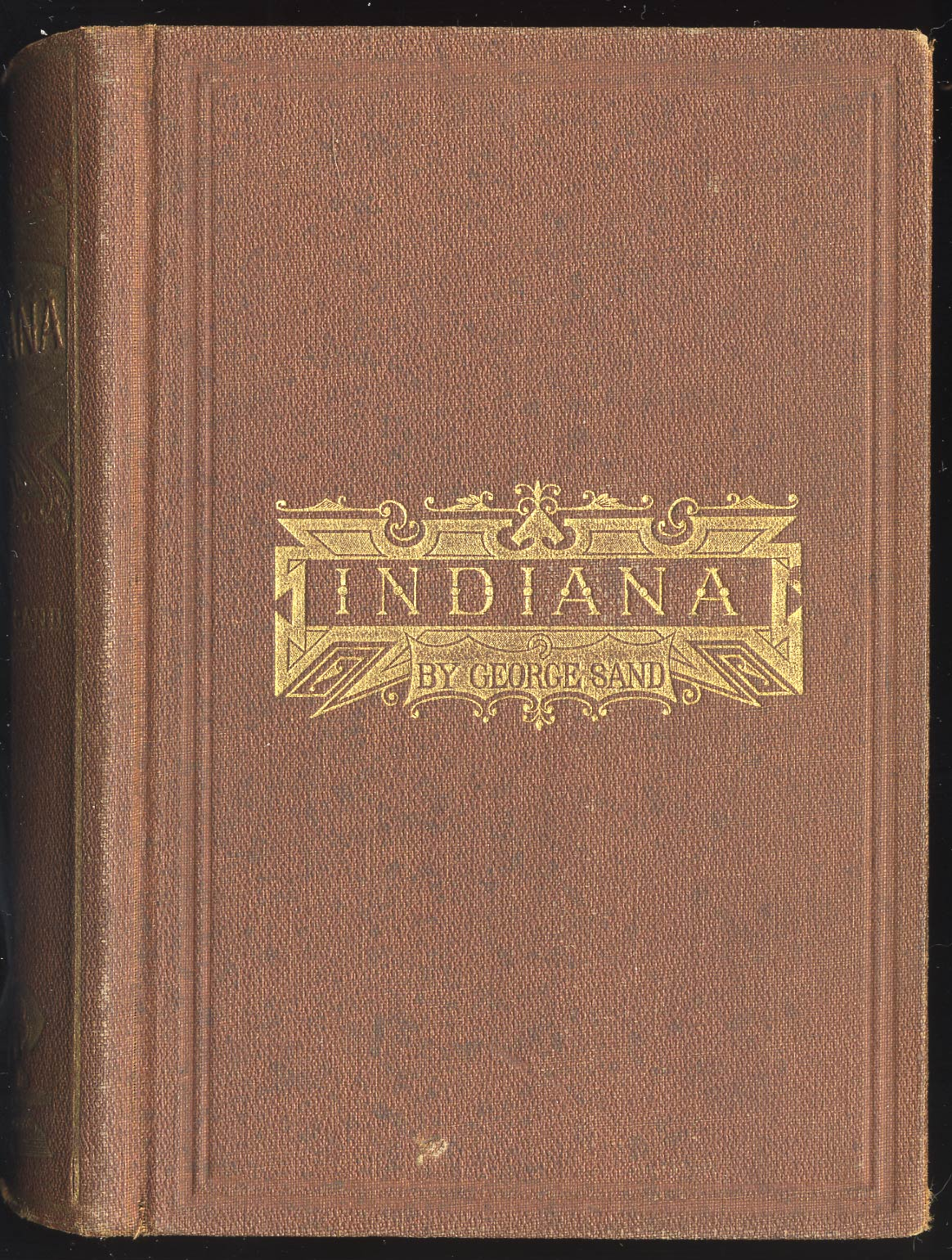
- Cover to the 1870 translation of Indiana by George W. Richards
- Author: George Sand
- Language: French
- Genre: Romantic
- Publication date: April 1832
- Publication place: France
- Pages: 344
- ISBN: 2-07-037604-4

Indiana is a novel about love and marriage written by Amantine Aurore Dupin; it was the first work she published under her pseudonym George Sand. Published in April 1832, the novel blends the conventions of romanticism, realism and idealism. As the novel is set partly in France and partly in the French colony of Réunion, Sand had to base her descriptions of the colony, where she had never been, on the travel writing of her friend Jules Néraud.

== Summary ==
One edition illustrated by Maurice Toussaint

Indiana is the story's heroine, a young noblewoman descended from French colonial settlers from Île Bourbon (now Réunion) and currently living in France. Indiana is married to an older ex-army officer named Colonel Delmare and suffers from a variety of unknown illnesses, presumably due to the lack of passion in her life. Indiana does not love Delmare and searches for someone who will love her passionately. She overlooks her cousin Ralph, who lives with her and the colonel. As it turns out, Ralph is in love with Indiana.

When their young, handsome and well-spoken neighbor, Raymon de Ramière, declares his interest to Indiana, she falls in love with him. Raymon has already seduced Indiana's maid, Noun, who is pregnant with his child. When Noun finds out what is going on, she drowns herself.

Indiana's husband decides that they will move to Île Bourbon. Indiana escapes the house to faithfully present herself in Raymon's apartments in the middle of the night, expecting him to accept her as his mistress in spite of society's inevitable condemnation. He at first attempts to seduce her but, on failing, rejects her once and for all. He cannot bear the thought that her will is stronger than his and writes her a letter intended to make her fall in love with him again, even though he has no intention of requiting this love.

Indiana has moved to the Island with the Colonel by the time she reads the letter. She resists the letter but finally returns to France on a perilous sea journey. When she arrives in Paris, the French Revolution of 1830 is taking place. In the meantime, Raymon has made an advantageous marriage and bought Indiana's house, where he and his wife live.

The stoic and remote Sir Ralph, whom Indiana has always seen as an "égoiste", suddenly comes to rescue her and tell her that Colonel Delmare has died from a fever. Indiana and Ralph decide to take their own lives together by jumping into a waterfall on the Île Bourbon. But on the way home, they fall in love. Just before the suicide, they declare their love for one another and pledge that they will be married in Heaven. At the end of the novel comes a conclusion, a young adventurer's account of finding a man and woman, Ralph and Indiana, living on an isolated farm on the Island.

== Themes ==
The novel deals with many typical nineteenth-century novelistic themes. These include adultery, social constraint, and unfulfilled longing for romantic love. The novel is an exploration of nineteenth-century female desire complicated by class constraints and by social codes about infidelity. In another sense, the novel critiques the laws around women's equality in France. Indiana cannot leave her husband, Colonel Delmare, because she lacks the protection of the law: under the Napoleonic Code, women could not obtain property, claim ownership of their children, or divorce. Finally, the novel touches on the subordination of the colonies to the French Empire.

== Main characters ==
- Indiana Delmare - young, attractive noblewoman trapped in a loveless marriage of convenience
- Sir Ralph - Indiana's cousin and potential suitor
- Raymon de Ramière - a handsome heartless young rake who ends up being a lover of Noun and Indiana, a practical seeker of wealth. (Note: Raymon may be modelled in part on Aurélien de Sèze, with whom Aurora had an intense but perhaps platonic affair in 1825.)
- Colonel Delmare - Indiana's husband
- Noun - lady's maid to Indiana, formerly grew up with her on the Ile de Reunion
- Madame de Ramière - Raymon's mother, a social schemer who tries to find a way to marry Indiana and Raymon
- Madame de Carvajal - Indiana's wealthy and affluent aunt.

== Legacy ==
In 2023, the Centre for Comparative Literature, University of Toronto staged a theatre adaptation of the novel in English at Alliance Française.

That same year, Claire Bouilhac and Catel Muller adapted Indiana into a graphic novel published by Europe Comics.
