= Jean-Pierre Rateau =

French politician

Jean-Pierre Lamotte-Rateau
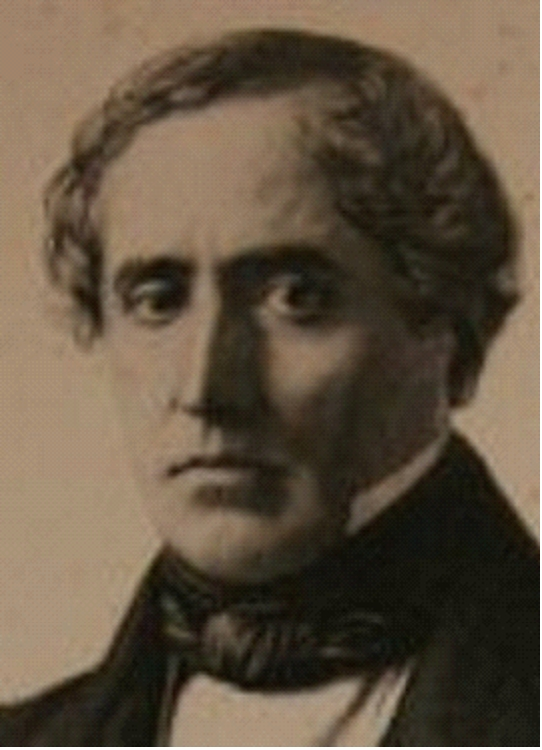
- Jean-Pierre Rateau c. 1849

Representative of Charente
- In office 23 April 1848 – 2 December 1851

Personal details
- Born: 24 April 1800 Aubeterre, Charente, France
- Died: 22 March 1887 (aged 86) Bordeaux, Gironde, France
- Known for: Rateau proposal

Jean-Pierre Lamotte-Rateau (24 April 1800 – 22 March 1887) was a French lawyer and politician who represented the department of Charente in the Constituent Assembly and then the Legislature during the French Second Republic. He is known as author of the Rateau proposal to dissolve the Constituent Assembly before all the organic laws had been passed, this preventing any reduction in the powers of the President Louis Napoleon Bonaparte.

== Early years (1800–48) ==
Jean-Pierre Lamotte-Rateau was born on 24 April 1800 in Aubeterre, Charente. (Note: The official parliamentary dictionary says he was born on 24 April 1800 in Aubeterre, Charente. Another source says he was born on 10 August 1800 in Bonnes, Charente. Bonnes is a village just south of Aubeterre.) He studied law and obtained a degree at the Faculty of Paris in 1820. He joined the bar in Bordeaux on 10 December 1821, and became known as a strong speaker. He became involved in politics. He supported the government of Louis-Philippe, but sided with the dynastic opposition in asking for electoral reform to add capabilities. Under this program he was appointed a member of the General Council of Gironde.

== Second Republic (1848–51) ==
After the February Revolution of 1848 Rateau ran for election to the Constituent Assembly and was elected as fifth of 6 with 37,839 out of 92,994 votes. He represented Charente in the National Constituent Assembly from 23 April 1848 to 26 May 1849. He sat with the Right parliamentary group. He was a member of the Justice Committee, and normally voted with the right. He voted for the restoration of security and physical coercion, for prosecution of Louis Blanc and Marc Caussidière, against abolition of the death penalty, against the Jules Grévy amendment to suppress the Presidency of the Republic, against the right to work, for the agenda in honor of Louis-Eugène Cavaignac, against reduction of the salt tax, against amnesty, for prohibition of clubs and for credits of the Expedition to Rome to remove the Roman Republic and restore the Pope. After the presidential election of 10 December 1848 he supported the government of Louis Napoleon Bonaparte.

Rateau was the author of the Rateau proposal, which was to dissolve the Constituent Assembly before it had drafted and voted on the organic laws. This proposal, supported by the followers of Louis Napoleon, was intended to end the opposition to presidential power by the majority. Rateau proposed that 19 March 1849 be fixed as the date when the Constituent Assembly would be dissolved and replaced by a new Legislative Assembly. By forcing early elections Rateau and others on the right seem to have expected that the Republican-oriented assembly would be replaced by a more conservative assembly due to the loss of popular support for the Republic after the June Days uprising. Jules Grévy strongly opposed ending the Constituent Assembly before it had passed all the organic laws need to complement the constitution.

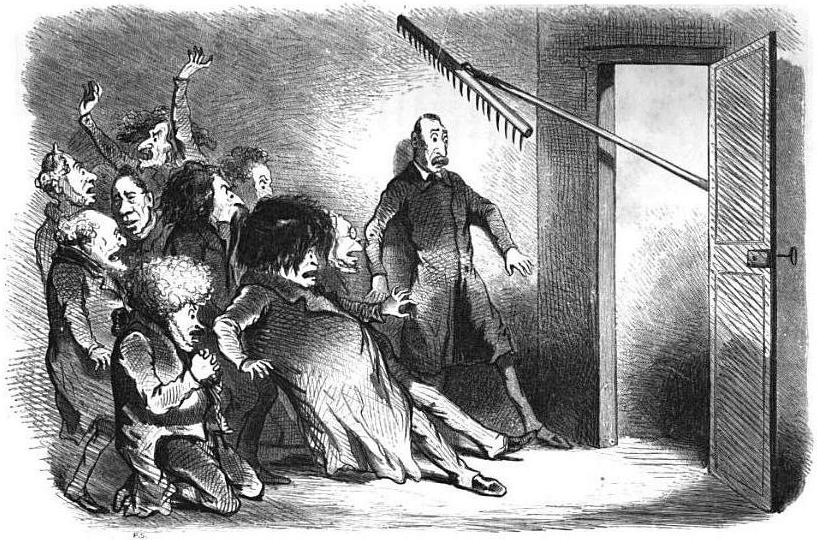
Rateau proposition by Amédée de Noé ("Cham"). The French word rateau means "rake".

At the session of 12 January 1849 the Rateau proposal was supported by Aurélien de Seze, Charles de Montalembert and Odilon Barrot, Minister of Justice and President of the council. The recommendation of the Justice Committee that the Rateau proposal be thrown out was put to the vote and rejected by 400 votes to 396, and the proposal remained under consideration. However, the next day Napoléon Joseph Curial, François Joseph Ducoux and Félix Chadenet wrote letters that disputed the accuracy of the vote count. The Rateau proposal was revived on 29 January 1849, when the recommendation of the committee that the Assembly should pass all the organic laws before dissolution was rejected by 416 votes to 405. Armand Fresneau, Victor Hugo and Mathieu de Combarel de Leyval supported the Rateau proposal, which was definitively adopted, despite lengthy counter arguments by Jules Favre. The Rateau proposal was adopted after an amendment proposed by Victor Lanjuinais by 470 votes to 337.

In the elections on 13 May 1849 Rateau was elected to the Legislative Assembly by 48,424, votes out of 79,163. He again sat with the Right parliamentary group. After being reelected Rateau continued to be hostile to the Republic, voted for the law of 31 May 1850^{(fr)} that restricted male universal suffrage and voted for revision of the constitution. He voted for the Rome expedition and for the Falloux-Parieu law on education. However, he remained attached to the parliamentary system and refused to support the policy of the Élysée Palace to the end.

== Last years (1851–87) ==
After the coup d'état of 2 December 1851 in which Napoleon III seized power Rateau returned to private life, and resumed his place at the Bordeaux Bar, of which he was president in 1838, 1856 and 1873. He was made a Knight of the Legion of Honour in 1873. Rateau died on 22 March 1887 in Bordeaux.

== Sources ==
- Jean, Pierre Rateau (in French), Assemblée nationale
- Lehning, James R. (2001), To be a Citizen: The Political Culture of the Early French Third Republic, Cornell University Press, ISBN 0-8014-3888-8
- Robert, Adolphe; Cougny, Gaston (1889–1891), "Rateau, Jean-Pierre", in Edgar Bourloton (ed.), Dictionnaire des Parlementaires français (1789–1889) (in French)
- Vapereau, Gustave (1861), "RATEAU (Jean-Pierre LAMOTTE-)", Dictionnaire universel des contemporains: contenant toutes les personnes notables de la France et des pays étrangers, avec leurs noms, prénoms, surnoms et pseudonymes ... etc (in French), L. Hachette
