= Mathieu de Combarel de Leyval =

Mathieu Jean Louis Désiré de Combarel de Leyval
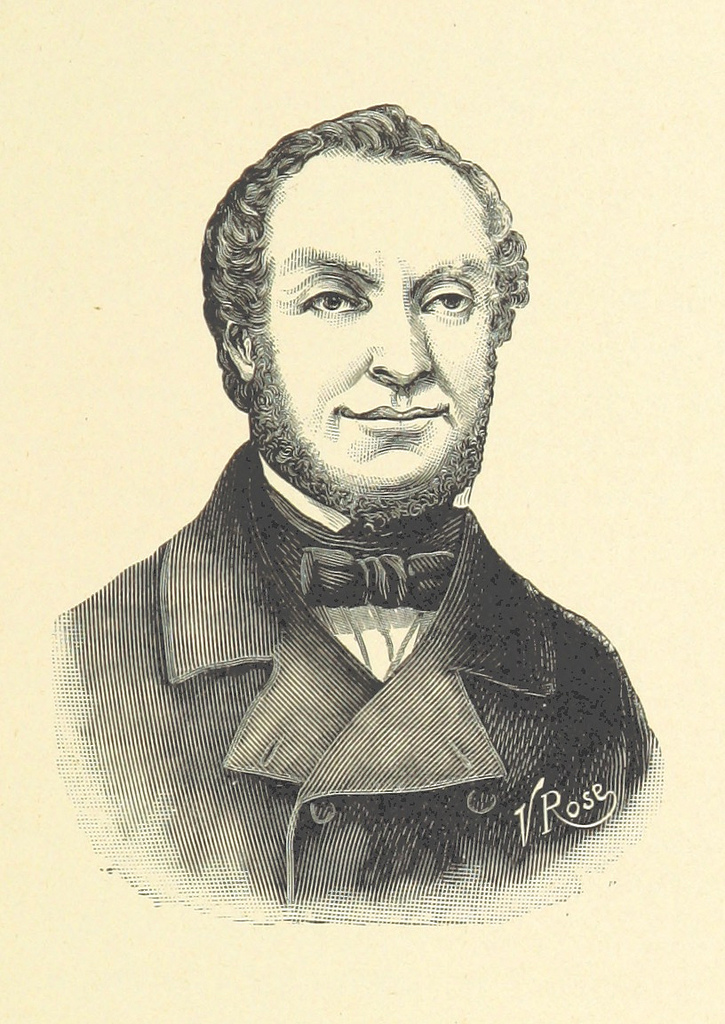
- Combarel de Leyval from an 1897 history

Deputy for Puy-de-Dôme
- In office 2 March 1839 – 24 February 1848

Representative for Puy-de-Dôme
- In office 23 April 1848 – 2 December 1851

Personal details
- Born: 11 February 1808 Le Vernet-Sainte-Marguerite, Puy-de-Dôme, France
- Died: 24 April 1869 (aged 61) Clermont-Ferrand, Puy-de-Dôme, France
- Occupation: Landowner, politician

Mathieu Jean Louis Désiré de Combarel de Leyval (11 February 1808 – 24 April 1869) was a French landowner and politician. He was a member of the National Assembly during the July Monarchy and the French Second Republic.

== Early years (1808–48) ==
Mathieu Jean Louis Désiré de Combarel de Leyval was born on 11 February 1808 in Le Vernet-Sainte-Marguerite, Puy-de-Dôme. His parents were Hippolyte de Combarel de Gibanel, owner of La Reynerie (died 1848) and Antoinette Françoise Hippolyte Dauphine de Leyval (died 1839). His maternal uncle was a former deputy of Puy-de-Dôme.

Combarel de Leyval inherited property, entered politics at an early age and was elected to the General Council of Puy-de-Dôme. Under the July Monarchy on 2 March 1839 Combarel de Leyval was elected Deputy of the 4th college (Riom) of Puy-de-Dôme. He sat with the center left, and generally voted for the government. He was reelected on 9 July 1842 by 146 votes out of 191, and on 1 August 1846 by 137 votes out of 232. He held office until 24 February 1848.

Combarel de Leyval was made a Knight of the Legion of Honour on 2 August 1845.

== Second Republic (1848–51) ==
Under the French Second Republic Combarel de Leyval was elected to the Constituent Assembly for Puy-de-Dôme on 23 April 1848. He sat with the Right. He voted on 9 August 1848 for reinstatement of the physical constraint, on 26 August 1848 for prosecution of Louis Blanc and Marc Caussidière, on 7 October 1848 against the Jules Grévy amendment to make the presidency subordinate to the Assembly, on 2 November 1848 against the right to work, on 4 November 1848 for the whole of the Constitution, on 25 November 1848 for congratulations to General Louis-Eugène Cavaignac, on 28 December 1848 against reduction of the salt tax, on 12 January 1849 for the Rateau proposal to dissolve the Assembly, on 21 March 1849 for prohibition of clubs and on 2 May 1849 against amnesty for the transportees. Combarel de Leyval spoke in the Assembly on several occasions, notably in the 29 January 1849 session to urge the Constituent Assembly to finish its work. After supporting Cavaignac's government he threw his support behind Louis Napoleon Bonaparte and declared that he was in favor of the expedition to Rome.

Combarel de Leyval was reelected to the Legislative Assembly on 13 May 1849, holding office until 2 December 1851. He was one of the strongest supporters of the reactionary policy of the government, and often spoke in defense of this policy. He voted for the law of 31 May 1850 restricting universal suffrage, for the Falloux-Parieu law on education, and for the revision of the Constitution.

== Later career (1851–69) ==
After the coup d'etat of 2 December 1851 Combarel de Leyval did not gain official support as candidate for the 4th constituency of Puy-de-Dôme in the 29 February 1852 Legislative Council elections. In fact he was strongly opposed by the administration and was not able to print election material. Two friends who distributed handwritten election papers in inns were arrested and imprisoned. He won only 1,456 votes against 20,782 for Francisque Rudel du Miral, who was elected. He then returned to private life. He died on 24 April 1869 in Clermont-Ferrand, Puy-de-Dôme.

== Sources ==
- Imhaus, Bernard, "Mathieu Jean Louis Désiré de COMBAREL de LEYVAL", Geneanet
- Magny, Le Marquis de (1847), Illustrations européennes... Livre d'or de la Noblesse, secrétariat général du collège Héraldique
- Mathieu, Louis, Désiré de Combarel de Leyval (in French), Assemblée nationale
- Robert, Adolphe; Cougny, Gaston (1889–1891), "Combarel de Leyval, Mathieu, Louis, Désiré de", in Edgar Bourloton (ed.), Dictionnaire des Parlementaires français (1789–1889) (in French)
