= Armand Fresneau =

French politician

Armand Félix Fresneau
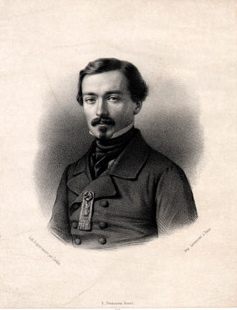
- Armand Fresneau in 1848

Representative of Ille-et-Vilaine
- In office 13 May 1849 – 2 December 1851

Representative of Morbihan
- In office 8 February 1871 – 7 March 1876

Senator of Morbihan
- In office 5 January 1879 – 13 November 1900

Personal details
- Born: 5 January 1823 Rennes, Ille-et-Vilaine, France
- Died: 13 November 1900 (aged 77) Pluneret, Morbihan, France
- Occupation: Politician

Armand Félix Fresneau (5 January 1823 – 13 November 1900) was a French politician. He was a deputy in the French Second Republic and again in the French Third Republic, and then was a Senator until his death. He was a right-wing supporter of the Catholic Church and of the Bourbon pretenders to the throne of France.

== Life ==
=== Monarchy (1823–48) ===
Armand Félix Fresneau was born in Rennes, Ille-et-Vilaine, on 5 January 1823. His parents were René Fresneau (1789–1855), a departmental prefect, and Amélie Jambin (c. 1796–1864). His father was Prefect of Corsica under the government of the July Monarchy. He studied at Rennes. In 1847 due to his father's influence he became the private secretary of Tanneguy Duchâtel, the Minister of the Interior. He expected to pursue a career in diplomacy.

=== Second Republic (1848–51) ===
With the February Revolution of 1848 Fresneau began an active career in politics with the support of the clergy and the Conservative party. He was elected to the National Constituent Assembly on 23 April 1848 for the department of Ille-et-Vilaine. He sat with the Legitimist Right parliamentary group. He made several speeches in the Constituent Assembly. On 6 October 1848 during the debate on the Constitution he insisted on the system of electing the president of France through universal suffrage as opposed to by vote of the Assembly. He supported the candidacy of Louis-Napoléon Bonaparte for the presidency.

Fresneau voted for reinstatement of the bond, for prosecution of Louis Blanc and Marc Caussidière, against the Jules Grévy amendment to make the president subordinate to the Assembly, against the right to work, for the agenda in honor of General Louis-Eugène Cavaignac, against reduction of the salt tax, against amnesty, for prohibition of clubs, for credits of the Rome expedition and against the abolition of the tax on drinks. On 29 June 1849 he spoke in favour of Jean-Pierre Rateau's proposal to dissolve the Constituent Assembly and elect a Legislative Assembly, saying the country was tired of the Assembly.

Fresneau was reelected to the National Legislative Assembly on 13 May 1849, and again sat with the Legitimist Right group. He continued to oppose the republican regime, and voted for the state of siege, for prosecution of the representatives compromised in the 13 June affair and for the law of 31 May restricting universal suffrage. On 2 December 1850 Fresneau married Henriette de Ségur (1829–1908). Their children included Elisabeth (1851–1943), Sabine (1853), Henriette (1857) and Armand (1861–1936). Towards the end of the legislature Fresneau began to disagree with from the policy of the president. He left office with the coup d'état of 2 December 1851.

=== Second Empire (1851–70) ===
After the coup Fresneau returned to private life. During the Second French Empire he spent most of his time on his properties. He made a single unsuccessful attempt at election to the legislature on 1 June 1863 as independent candidate in the 2nd district of Morbihan. He won only 7.155 votes against 22.383 to the incumbent, Joseph Honorat André Le Mélorel de la Haichois.

=== National Assembly (1870–76) ===
During the French Third Republic Fresneau was elected to represent the Morbihan department on 8 February 1871, and sat with the Extreme Right group. He held office until 7 March 1876. He was one of the most active members of the Catholic and Legitimist party. He voted for peace with Prussia, for public prayers, for repeal of the laws of exile of the princes, for the constituent power of the Assembly and against the return of the Assembly from Versailles to Paris. He directed several speeches against the government of Adolphe Thiers. In 1872 he co-authored a bill to organize the service of chaplains in the army.

In 1873 Fresneau voted for the resignation of Thiers, and then fully associated himself with the ministry of Albert de Broglie, and for restoration of the monarchy. After this failed, he became a supporter of the septennat (7-year presidential mandate). However, he turned against the de Broglie ministry and contributed to its fall in May 1874 when he became convinced that the Orléanists had obstructed recognition of Henri, Count of Chambord as king. He spoke on the municipal election law and on municipal organization. He supported the motion of the right for restoration of the monarchy. He voted against the Wallon amendment, against the 25 February 1875 constitution and for the law on higher education.

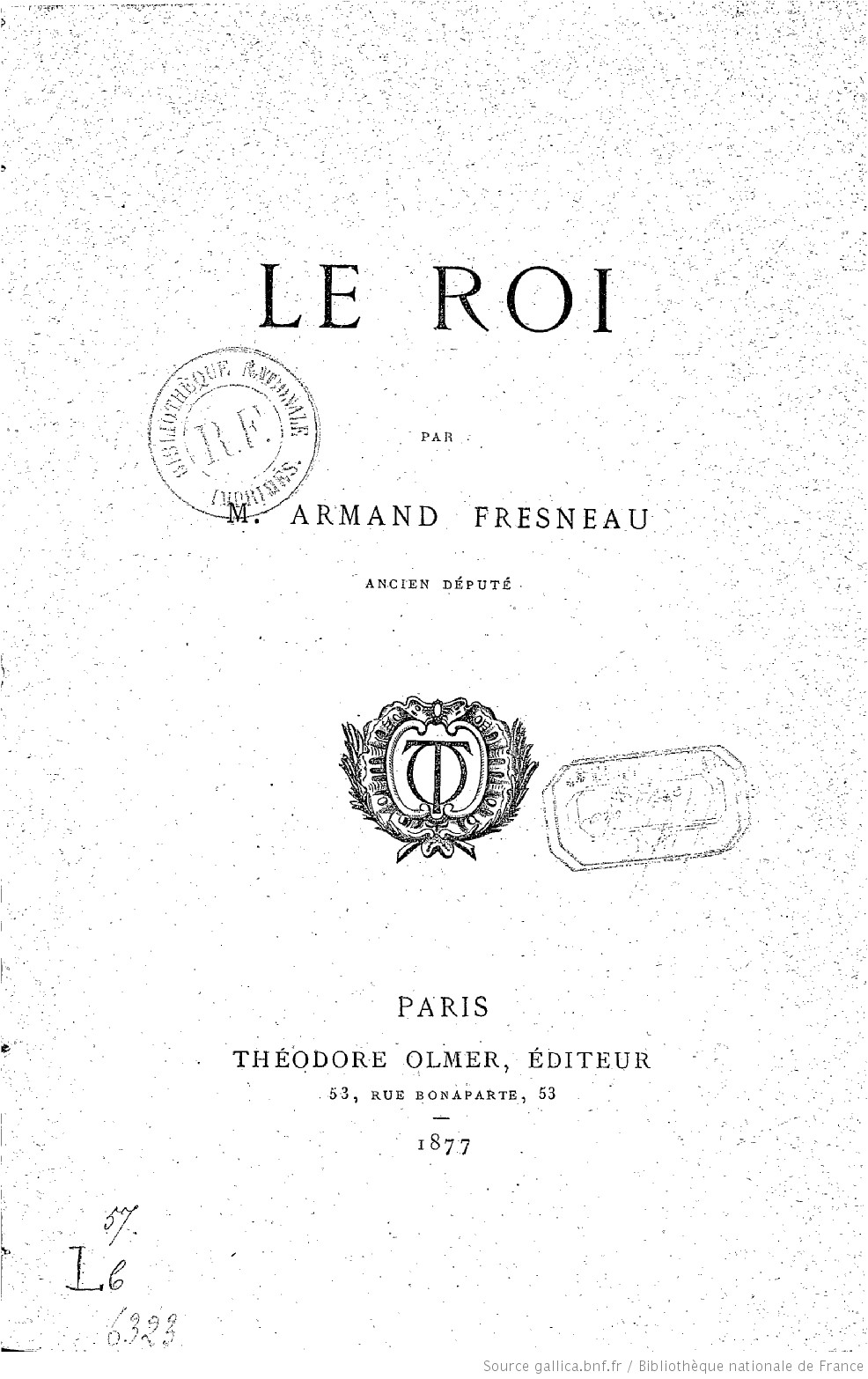
Cover of Le Roi (1877)

After the dissolution of the National Assembly in 1876 Fresneau did not run for election to the legislature or the senate. In 1877 he published a pamphlet entitled Roi (King).

=== Senate (1879–1900) ===
Fresneau ran in a senate partial renewal election (Note: At this time 1/3 of the senate seats came up for election every three years. The January 1879 elections were the first partial renewal of the senate in the Third Republic.) in Morbihan on 5 January 1879 and was elected by 193 votes out of 327. He again joined the most militant of the monarchist conservatives. He fiercely opposed the laws on education presented by Jules Ferry, and again raised the question of religion in an interpellation concerning a decision of the Besançon and Douai academic councils. On 10 December 1882 he questioned Jules Duvaux, Minister of Public Education, about the suppression of religious symbols in school premises. In July 1883 he protested at length about suspension of irremovability of the magistracy. In November 1884 he fought the proposal to reform Senate elections. He defended the surtax on cereals and import duties on cattle, attacked the government's financial management, discussed secularization of primary education, tried to delay the Franco-Italian tade treaty and voted against modification of the judicial oath, against the reform of the staff of the judiciary, against the law of divorce, against the expulsion of the princes and against the new military law.

Fresneau was reelected to the senate on 5 January 1888. He won 647 votes out of 944. He continued to strongly assert his legitimist and Catholic views. On 13 February 1889 he abstained from voting on renewal of the district poll. He voted against the draft Lisbonne law to restrict the freedom of the press, and against the Senate process to judge attacks against the security of the state by General Georges Ernest Boulanger. Fresneau opposed state intervention in social affairs and in education. He led opposition in the senate to the Bovier-Lapierre^{(fr)} law on professional unions of managers and workers. He supported long terms of military service, but in 1889 voted against a new law on recruitment to the army. He was opposed to the existence of the Ministry of the Colonies, which he felt should be managed by the Ministry of the Navy. On economic matters he was protectionist. He was one of the fourteen senators who refused to vote confidence in the Ribot government after the inquiry into the Panama Affair.

In 1890 Fresneau condemned the action of Minister of Education and Fine Arts, Léon Bourgeois, in secularizing the Vicq school. On 6 February 1891 he objected to a statue of Jean-Paul Marat that the municipality of Paris had erected, which he said "glorified the crimes of terrorists and the Terror." On 25 March 1892 he denounced the appointment of the positivist Pierre Laffitte, a disciple of Auguste Comte, as professor of the general history of science at the Collège de France. He saw this as support for revolutionary atheists. Fresneau was reelected on 3 January 1897. He died on 13 November 1900 in the Château de Kermadio, Pluneret, Morbihan.

== Publications ==
Publications by Fresneau include:

- Armand Félix Fresneau (1847), L'Éclectisme, Paris: au Comptoir des imprimeurs-unis, p. 144
- Armand Félix Fresneau (1851), La Planche de salut, Paris: Comon, p. 65
- Armand Félix Fresneau (1860), De la Constitution politique des États de l'Église, Paris: A. Vaton, p. 232
- Armand Félix Fresneau (1863), Évêques et professeurs, réflexions sur les balances de l'État, Paris: J. Lecoffre, p. 36
- Armand Félix Fresneau (6 September 1868), Kermadio, du 1er avril au 15 août 1868 ... Comment on peut quintupler le revenu d'une ferme bretonne (Rapport adressé à M. le Cte de Ségur d'Aguesseau), Versailles: impr. de Brunox, p. 24
- Armand Félix Fresneau (1868), Protestation contre l'élection de Lorient (Morbihan) (La Cour. imp. sert de titre), Paris
- Armand Félix Fresneau (10 December 1873), Rapport fait au nom de la commission de l'armée chargée d'examiner la proposition de M. Philippoteaux, ayant pour objet de déclarer inéligibles à l'Assemblée nationale les militaires et marins en activité de service (Assemblée nationale. 1873. N ° 2091), Versailles: Impr. de Cerf et fils, p. 8
- Armand Félix Fresneau (1877), Le roi, Paris: T. Olmer, p. 32
- Armand Félix Fresneau (1879), Ce ne sont point les masses populaires qui ont empêché la restauration de la monarchie légitime en 1873..., Vannes: imp. de Galles
- Armand Félix Fresneau (1879), L'Atelier français en 1879, Paris: E. Dentu, p. 69
- Armand Félix Fresneau (1881), La fédération et le clergé, Paris: Dentu, p. 24
- Armand Félix Fresneau (1881), La fédération et les domestiques, Paris: Dentu éditeur, p. 16
- Armand Félix Fresneau (1882), Une nation au pillage (Extrait de la "Revue trimestrielle"), Châteauroux: impr. de A. Majesté, p. 32
- Armand Félix Fresneau (1888), Une nation au pillage, Paris: H. Gautier, p. 273
- Armand Félix Fresneau (2 March 1888), Premier Rapport fait, au nom de la Commission chargée d'ouvrir une enquête sur les provenances, qualités et prix des fournitures militaires et autres inscrites au budget de l'Etat (ministère de la marine) (Sénat. Session 1888. N ° 145), Paris: Impr. de P. Mouillot / France. Sénat, p. 16
- Armand Félix Fresneau (1893), Où est la Force ?, Tours: imp. de A. Mame et fils, p. 52

== Sources ==
- Armand, Félix Fresneau (in French), Assemblée nationale
- Armand Félix Fresneau (1823-1900) (in French), BnF: Bibliotheque nationale de France
- Jolly, Jean, ed. (1960), "Fresneau (Armand Félix)", Dictionnaire des parlementaires français de 1889 à 1940, Presses universitaires de France
- Pierfit, "Armand FRESNEAU", Geneanet (in French)
- Robert, Adolphe; Cougny, Gaston (1889–1891), "Fresneau, Armand Félix", in Edgar Bourloton (ed.), Dictionnaire des Parlementaires français (1789–1889) (in French)
