= Ariste Jacques Trouvé-Chauvel =

French businessman, banker and politician

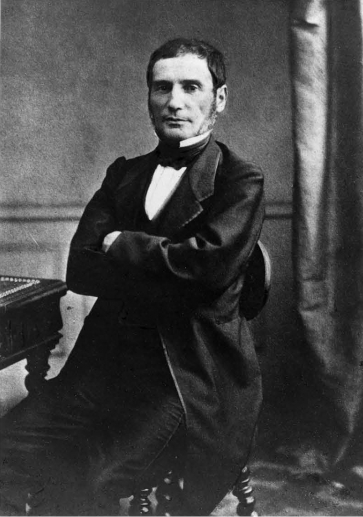
- Born: 8 November 1805; La Suze-sur-Sarthe, Sarthe, France
- Died: 14 October 1883 (aged 77); Paris, France
- Occupation: Politician
- Known for: Minister of Finance

Ariste Jacques Trouvé-Chauvel (French pronunciation: [aʁist ʒak tʁuve ʃovɛl]; 8 November 1805 – 14 October 1883) was a French businessman, banker and politician. He was briefly Minister of Finance towards the end of 1848.

== Early years ==
Ariste Jacques Trouvé-Chauvel was born in La Suze-sur-Sarthe, Sarthe, on 8 November 1805 (17 Brumaire year XIV). He was the son of René Trouvé (1781-1850) and Anne-Magdeleine-Louise Dorizon (1783-1845). His family came from Fillé, on the Sarthe River, about 12 kilometres (7.5 mi) south of Le Mans. They became merchants and then tanners at La Suze.

Trouvé-Chauvel studied at the School of Commerce in Paris. He worked for a merchant in Le Havre from 1826 to 1830, and then spent three years in manufacturing companies in England, Scotland and Ireland. When he returned to France he had become a believer in economic liberalism. In 1833 he set up business in Le Mans as a wholesale dealer in linen, muslin and lace. He was associated with a wholesale lace merchant, Louis-François Chauvel, whose daughter he married in 1834. He soon expanded his operations to discounting letter of exchange and settling commercial trades, a common practice at the time when there were no banks in the provinces to provide these services.

== Banker and politician ==
Trouvé-Chauvel became an alderman of Le Mans in 1833 and General Counsel of the Sarthe in 1839. He became an ally of François Sevin, and on 9 August 1838 co-signed with Sevin a proposal for a Commercial, Industrial and Agricultural Bank of Sarthe. However, given their republican views they could not win government approval for a public limited company. The minister recommended that they create a society that could not issue shares, and they accepted this restriction, in 1840 creating a Caisse commerciale industrielle et agricole de la Sarthe. The name Caisse was chosen rather than Banque to avoid regulation by the Banque de France, which wanted to restrict competition. The same year they opened branches in Sablé, La Flèche and Paris. Over the next few years Trouvé-Chauvel also launched enterprises such as an insurance company, mills and a barge company.

In 1840 Trouvé-Chauvel was appointed mayor of Le Mans, despite his Republican views. He gave a speech during a visit to the town by Prince Louis, Duke of Nemours that criticized the Orleans regime. He was dismissed along with all the other council members. A few days later he was reelected as councilor and soon after as deputy mayor.

== Second Republic politician ==
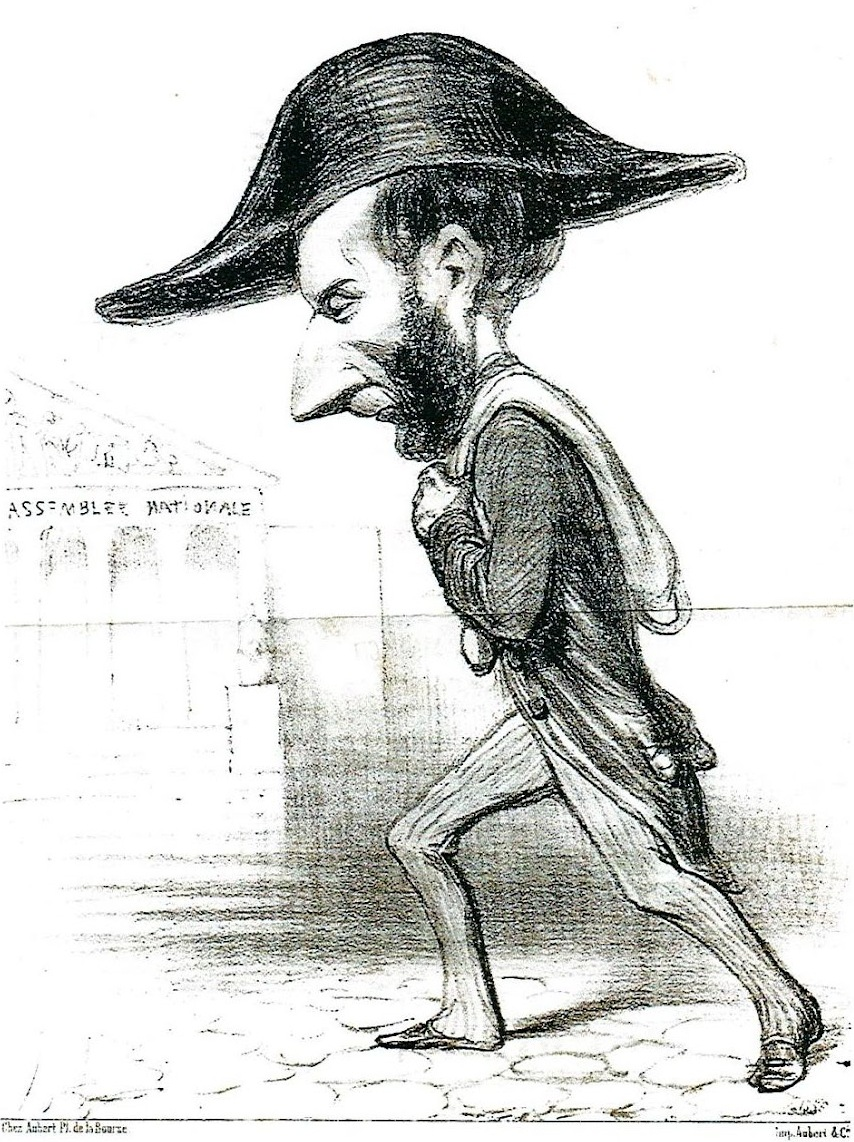
Caricature by Honoré Daumier, December 1848. The caption reads in part "Rigid guardian of the Republic, citizen Trouve-Chauvel is never separated from the treasure when he goes to the National Assembly. It is true that it is very easy to carry on his shoulder...".

Trouvé-Chauvel was returned as Mayor of Le Mans after the February Revolution of 1848, and was named General Commissioner of the Republic in the departments of Maine-et-Loire and Mayenne. The revolution had aggravated the economic crisis that began in 1847, and the Caisse de la Sarthe found itself in serious difficulty. Trouvé-Chauvel managed to organize a mutual credit association of the bankers of Sarthe, Orne, Mayenne and Maine-et-Loire, which became a National Discount Counter that began to operate on 15 May 1848. By this time Trouvé-Chauvel was absorbed in political issues and could spare no time for the banking business.

On 23 April 1848 Trouvé-Chauvel was elected to the Constituent Assembly as representative of Sarthe, sitting with the more moderate Republicans. He was Prefect of Police in Paris from 18 May 1848 to 19 July 1948. He backed up General Louis-Eugène Cavaignac during the June Days Uprising from June 23 to 26. On 19 July 1948 he was appointed Prefect of the Seine. He was replaced as Prefect of Police by François Joseph Ducoux. On 25 October 1848 Trouvé-Chauvel was appointed Minister of Finance in the cabinet of General Cavaignac, holding office until the cabinet was dissolved on 20 December 1848. He was not reelected to the legislature after the election of Prince Louis Napoleon Bonaparte to the Presidency.

== Later years ==
In January 1849 the Caisse de la Sarthe was placed in liquidation. Trouvé-Chauvel was appointed liquidator of the Caisse, but his political opponents determined to destroy him. He and the other Republicans were routed in the legislative elections of 13 May 1849. In December 1850 Trouvé-Chauvel was dismissed from his position as liquidator of the Caisse de la Sarthe. When the coup of 2 December 1851 was announced, a false rumor was spread in Le Mans of the failure of the Caisse de la Sarthe. On the morning on 5 December 1851 he took up arms with the workers of his tannery at La Suze, but when the success of the coup was confirmed he fled the country. He took refuge in Jersey, then London and finally Brussels. There he found Victor Hugo and made plans to launch a liberal periodical, but the project was abandoned due to lack of funds.

Trouvé-Chauvel was granted a special amnesty on 6 August 1854. Around 1858-60 he was the Paris agent for English bankers engaged in speculations in French railways in Algeria. Ariste Jacques Trouvé-Chauvel died in the 17th arrondissement of Paris on 14 October 1883. He was aged 77.

== Sources ==
- Antonetti, Guy; Cardoni, Fabien; Oliveira, Matthieu de (2007). "Trouvé-Chauvel (Ariste-Jacques)". Les ministres des Finances de la Révolution française au Second Empire. Vol. III. Institut de la gestion publique et du développement économique. ISBN 9782110948083.
- Mead, Christopher Curtis; Baltard, Victor (2012), Making Modern Paris: Victor Baltard's Central Markets and the Urban Practice of Architecture, University of Pennsylvania Press, ISBN 978-0-271-05087-4
- Robert, Adolphe; Bourloton, Edgar; Cougny, Gaston (1891). Dictionnaire des parlementaires français: comprenant tous les membres des assemblées françaises et tous les ministres français depuis le ler mai 1789 jusqu'au ler mai 1889, avec leurs noms, état civil, états de services, actes politiques, votes parlementaires, etc. Bourloton.
- "Trouvé-Chauvel". Institut de la gestion publique et du développement économique (IGPDE). Archived from the original on 2014-01-11.
