= Le Vernet-Sainte-Marguerite =

- Commune
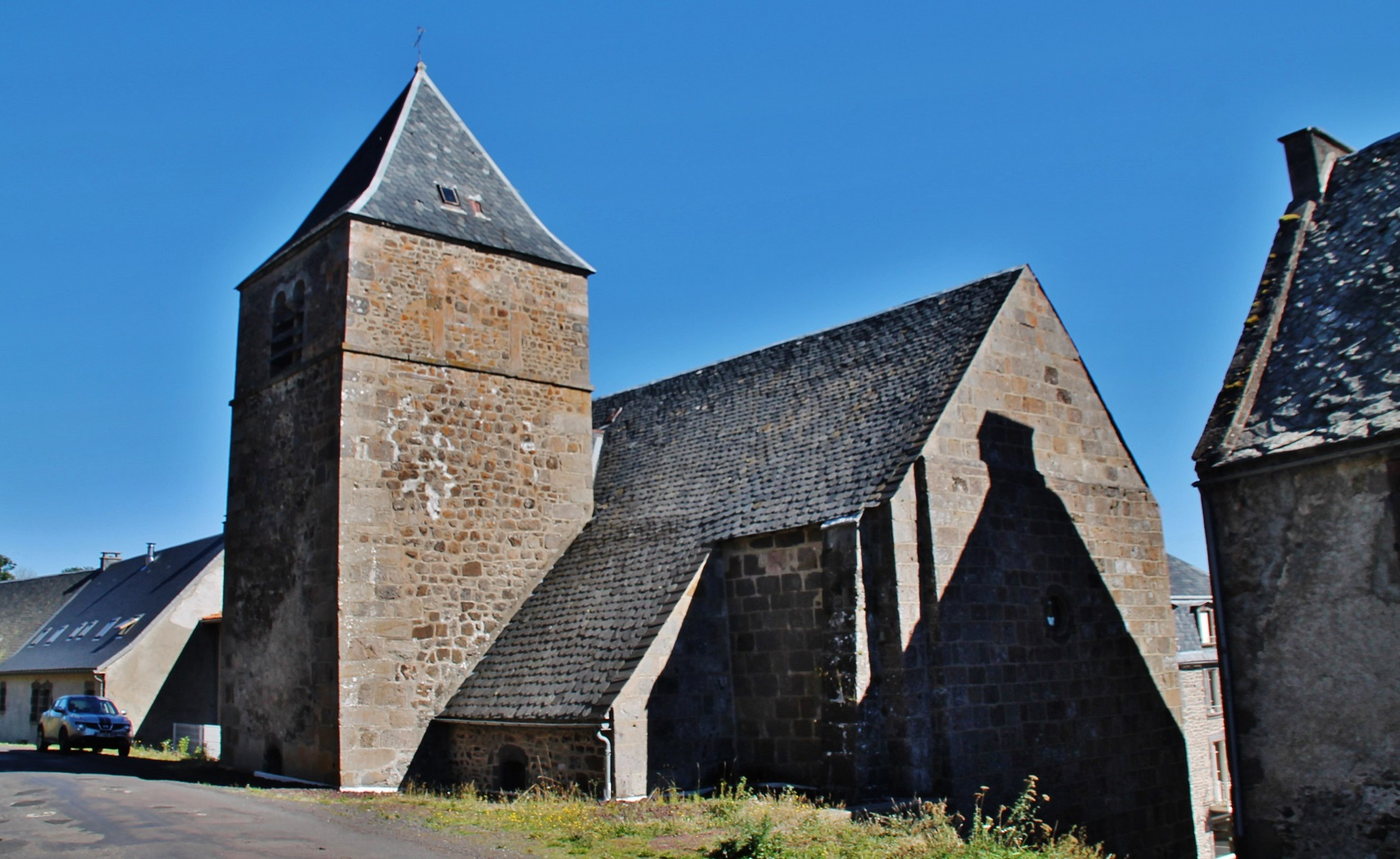
- The church in Le Vernet-Sainte-Marguerite
- Location of Le Vernet-Sainte-Marguerite
- Location within France Location within Auvergne-Rhône-Alpes
- Coordinates: 45°36′36″N 2°56′53″E
- Country: France
- Region: Auvergne-Rhône-Alpes
- Department: Puy-de-Dôme
- Arrondissement: Issoire
- Canton: Orcines
- Intercommunality: Massif du Sancy

Government
  - Mayor (2020–2026): Laurent Raymond Dabert
- Area^{1}: 25.03 km^{2} (9.66 sq mi)
- Elevation: 1 m (3.3 ft)
- Highest elevation: 1,363 m (4,472 ft)
- Lowest elevation: 869 m (2,851 ft)
- Population (2023): 327
  - Density: 13.1/km^{2} (33.8/sq mi)
- Time zone: UTC+01:00 (CET)
  - Summer (DST): UTC+02:00 (CEST)
- INSEE/Postal code: 63449 /63710
- ^{1} French Land Register data, which excludes lakes, ponds, glaciers > 1 km^{2} (0.386 sq mi or 247 acres) and river estuaries.

Le Vernet-Sainte-Marguerite (French pronunciation: [lə vɛʁne sɛ̃t maʁɡərit]) is a commune in the Puy-de-Dôme department in Auvergne in central France.

== Notable people ==
- Mathieu de Combarel de Leyval (1808–69), member of the National Assembly during the July Monarchy and the French Second Republic.

== See also ==
- Communes of the Puy-de-Dôme department
