= Aurélien de Sèze =

French lawyer

Jean-Pierre Aurélien de Sèze
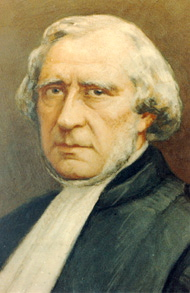

Representative of Gironde
- In office 23 April 1848 – 2 December 1851

Personal details
- Born: 11 September 1799 Saint-Médard-d'Eyrans, Gironde, France
- Died: 23 January 1870 (aged 70) Bordeaux, Gironde, France
- Occupation: Lawyer, magistrate, politician

Jean-Pierre Aurélien de Sèze (11 September 1799 – 23 January 1870) was a French lawyer who represented Gironde in the National Assembly during the French Second Republic. As a young man he had an intense but platonic affair with the future novelist George Sand. Politically, he was conservative and a legitimist monarchist.

== Life ==
=== Early years (1799–1830) ===
Jean-Pierre Aurélien de Sèze was born on 11 September 1799 in the Chateau d'Eyrans, Saint-Médard-d'Eyrans, Gironde. His parents were Paul Victor de Sèze (1754–1830), a physician and rector of the Bordeaux Academy, and Suzanne Caroline de Raymond Sallegourde (1770–1851), Marquise de Sallegourde. His uncle was the defender of King Louis XVI. He became a lawyer in 1820, and entered the magistracy as a substitute in Bordeaux in 1824. He was appointed Deputy Attorney General in 1825 and Advocate General in 1827.

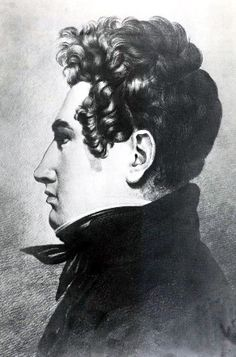
Aurélien de Sèze as a young man

At the age of 25 de Sèze visited Cauterets so he could spend time with his fiancée, Mlle Laure Le Hoult, and her family. There he met Aurore Dupin, later known by her pseudonym George Sand, and was profoundly attracted to her. He admitted that his fiancée was "very beautiful, but without ideas." He wrote to Aurore, "No one speaks like you, no one has your accent, your voice, your laugh, your way of seeing a thing and expressing the idea. No one sees this but me." Aurore reciprocated, with an intense but platonic passion for Aurélien. Some of de Seze's personality may be seen in Raymon, the libertine in Sand's first novel, Indiana (1832).

=== July Monarchy (1830–48) ===
After the July Revolution of 1830 de Sèze resigned rather than take an oath of loyalty to the Orléanist branch and returned to private practice at the Bordeaux bar, where he pleaded in several important criminal trials. On 31 July 1833 he married Marie Eugénie Claire Pauline Louise de Villeminot (1812–87). Their children included Marie Thérèse Charlotte Marguerite Claire Victoire Félicité Henriette (1834–1912), Victor (1835–1906), Paul François Joseph Marie Romain (1837–1919), Marguerite (1838–1863), Tony (1841–1872), Bathilde Gabrielle Marie Suzanne (1843–1924), Jean (1847–1856), Aurélien (1850–1921) and Louise (1851–1917). He became bâtonnier (President of the Bar) in 1841 and was appointed to the General Counsel of Gironde in 1847. He was a Catholic, a passionate royalist and active in politics in the Gironde.

=== Second Republic (1848–51) ===
On 23 April 1848 de Sèze was elected representative of Gironde in the Constituent Assembly. He sat with the Right parliamentary group. He was a member of the Justice Committee. He voted for the prosecution of Louis Blanc and Marc Caussidière, for restoration of physical constraint, against abolition of the death penalty and against the constitutional amendment of Jules Grévy. He abstained from the vote on honouring General Louis-Eugène Cavaignac. He voted for the Rateau proposal, for prohibition of clubs, for credits for the Roman expedition, against amnesty and for abolition of the tax on beverages. He spoke several times, particularly in the 12 January 1849 session on the Rateau proposal.

On 13 May 1849 de Sèze was reelected representative of Gironde in the Legislative Assembly, where he sat with the monarchist majority and was vice-president of the Assembly. He voted for the Rome expedition, for the Falloux-Parieu education law and for the law restricting universal suffrage, which he helped to draft. Although he had supported the policy of Prince Louis-Napoleon, he opposed the coup d'état of 2 December 1851.

=== Second Empire (1851–70) ===
De Sèze joined the Paris Bar, and became a member of the council of the bar in 1863. He returned to Bordeaux in 1865, and again became bâtonnier (President of the Bar) in 1868. He died on 23 January 1870 in Bordeaux, Gironde.

== Publications ==
Publications by Aurélien de Sèze include:

- Aurélien de Sèze (6 December 1849), Rapport fait au nom de la 4e Commission d'initiative parlementaire, sur la proposition de MM. Fourtanier, de Laussat, Pécoul... relative à l'indemnité accordée aux colons, Paris: Impr. de l'Assemblée nationale, p. 7
- Aurélien de Sèze (27 July 1850), Rapport fait sur la proposition de M. C. Lagrange tendant à autoriser les Représentants présents à Paris à assister aux séances de la Commission de prorogation, Paris: Impr. de l'Assemblée nationale, p. 6
- Aurélien de Sèze (3 August 1850), Rapport fait au nom de la Commission chargée d'examiner les propositions faites, l'une par MM. de Tinguy, Démarest et Tron, l'autre par les Représentants du Pas-de-Calais, et tendant à autoriser la réunion extraordinaire des Conseils généraux, Paris: Impr. de l'Assemblée nationale, p. 32
- Aurélien de Sèze (24 March 1851), Proposition relative aux travaux exécutés par l'Etat dans le lit des fleuves et rivières navigables ou flottables, Paris: Impr. de l'Assemblée nationale, p. 7
- Pierre Antoine Berryer; Jules Dufaure; Aurélien de Sèze; Henri de Vatimesnil (1860), Consultation relative à des faits qui se sont passés à Vesoul à l'occasion de la brochure de Mgr de Ségur, intitulée "Le Pape", Paris: impr. de W. Remquet, p. 14
- Aurélien de Sèze (1864), Consultation pour la famille de Montmorency contre M. Adalbert de Talleyrand-Périgord, Guyot et Scribe

== Sources ==
- Aurélien de Sèze (1799-1870) (in French), BnF: Bibliotheque nationale de France
- Hiddleston, J.A. (2017-12-02), George Sand and Autobiography, Taylor & Francis, ISBN 978-1-351-19865-3
- Jack, Belinda (2012-02-01), George Sand: A Woman's Life Writ Large, Knopf Doubleday Publishing Group, ISBN 978-0-307-81466-1
- Jean-Pierre, Aurélien de Sèze (in French), Assemblée nationale
- Robert, Adolphe; Cougny, Gaston (1889–1891), "Sèze, Jean-Pierre, Aurélien de", in Edgar Bourloton (ed.), Dictionnaire des Parlementaires français (1789–1889) (in French)
- Sand, George (1991), Story of My Life: The Autobiography of George Sand, SUNY Press, ISBN 978-0-7914-0580-2
- Savignac, Philippe, Jean Pierre Aurélien de SEZE (in French)
