= Philibert Jean-Baptiste Curial =

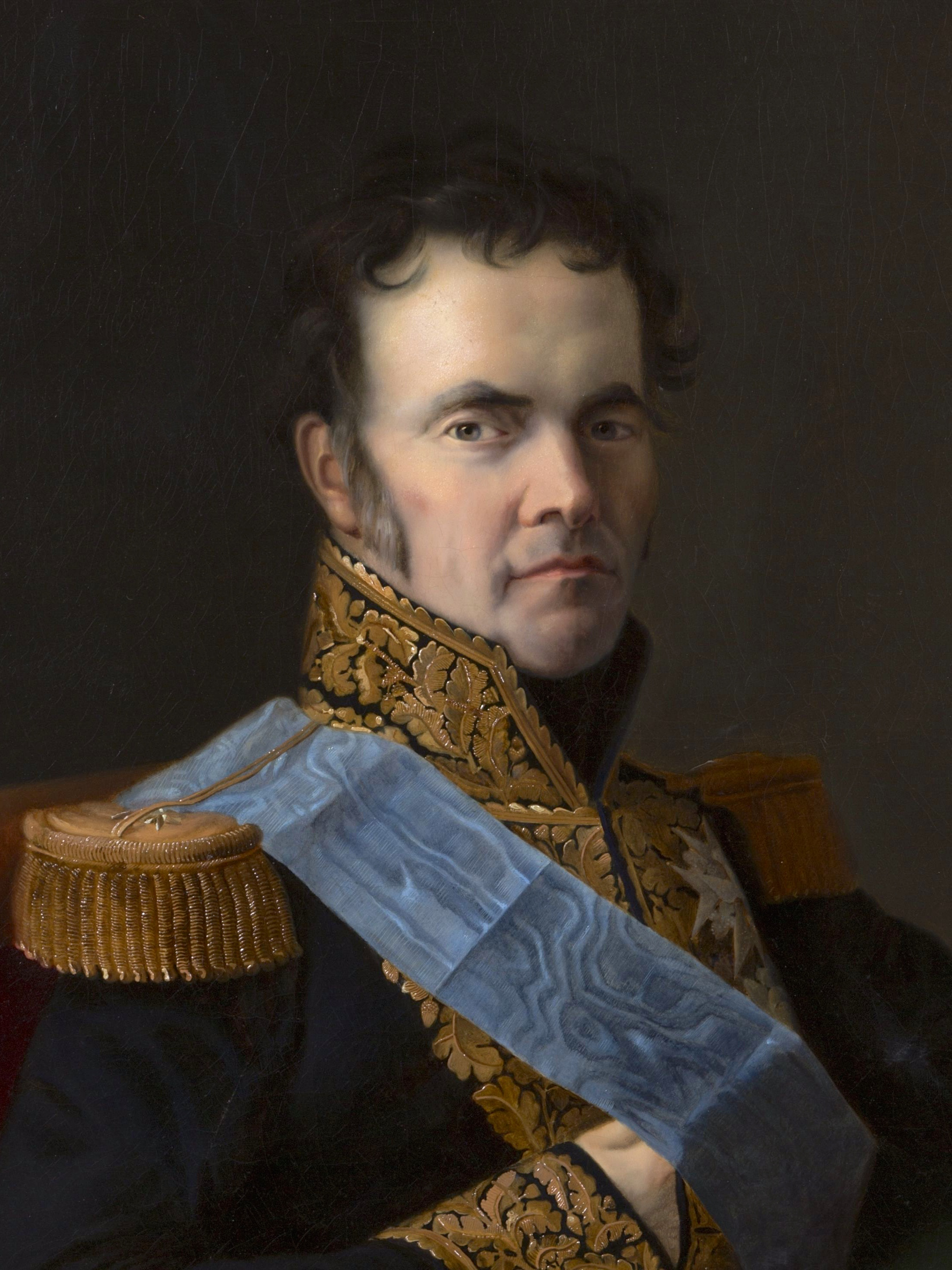
- Philibert Jean-Baptiste Curial, an 1820 portrait
- Born: 21 April 1774; Saint-Pierre-d'Albigny, Savoy
- Died: 30 May 1829 (aged 55); Paris
- Military career
- Allegiance: France
- Branch: Infantry
- Service years: 1792–1825
- Rank: Général de division
- Conflicts: French Revolutionary Wars; Napoleonic Wars; Spanish Expedition
- Awards: Comte of the Empire; Grand Cross of the Legion of Honour; Grand Cross of the Order of the Reunion; Commander of the Royal and Military Order of Saint Louis

Philibert-Jean-Baptiste François Joseph, comte Curial (French pronunciation: [filibɛʁ ʒɑ̃ batist fʁɑ̃swa ʒozɛf]; 21 April 1774 – 30 May 1829) was a general in the French Imperial Army during the Napoleonic Wars.

== Early life and career ==
Curial was the son of François Joseph Curial (1740-1801) and his wife, Marie Domenget. His father was a judge in the Mont Blanc Civil Court, and a representative for Mont Blanc on the Council of Ancients.

When the French invaded Savoy in 1793, Curial embarked on a military career. He began his career in the Légion des Allobroges, with the rank of captain. He was sent by the National Convention to Southern France under the command of General Jean François Carteaux, to pursue the Federalist insurgents. He then joined the French Army of Italy, and then took part in the Egyptian campaign. He took part in almost all of the battles that the French fought in and was promoted to the rank of chef de bataillon in 1799. Appointed colonel of the 88th Infantry Regiment on 12 Frimaire year XII, he received the decoration of the Legion of Honour on the 19th of the same month, that of officer on 25 Prairial, and served with distinction at the Battle of Austerlitz. His conduct during the battle earned him the cross of commander of the Legion of Honour, which he received on 4 Nivôse year XIII, and the rank of colonel-major of the 2nd regiment of chasseurs-à-pied of the Imperial Guard.

== Campaigning with Napoleon ==
Curial distinguished himself at the Battle of Eylau, and again at the Battle of Friedland, after which he was elevated to the rank of Général de brigade, and obtained the title of Baron of the Empire in 1808. He went on to play a decisive role in the Battle of Aspern-Essling, capturing the village of Essling after seven previous attacks had failed. This feat of arms earned him the rank of général de division, which the emperor conferred on him on 5 June 1809. Back in Paris, General Curial married the daughter of State Councilor Count Beugnot. He took part in the French invasion of Russia in 1812, commanding the Fusiliers-Chasseurs Regiment of the Imperial Guard, once more demonstrating great personal courage. Curial survived the French retreat, and in 1813 he was charged by the Emperor to organize and then take command of twelve new battalions of the Young Guard. He led these troops in the German Campaign of 1813 and took part in the Battle of Leipzig on 16 October, where he seized Dolitz's position, pushed the enemy back across the river Pleiße, and captured a large number of Austrian troops, including General Merfeldt.

On 30 October Curial was heavily involved in defending against the Austro-Bavarian army attempting to cut off the retreat of the French army at the Battle of Hanau. As a reward for his services during this battle, he received the Grand Cross of the Order of the Reunion. Curial took part in all the battles against the allied forces as they pushed into France, and particularly distinguished himself at the battles of Vauchamps and Craonne under the emperor, and the Battle of Paris under Marshal Mortier. The Emperor created him count of the Empire on 22 March 1814.

== Bourbon Restoration and the Hundred Days ==
Curial was one of the first general officers to announce their obedience to the acts of the Sénat conservateur and give their support to Louis XVIII on the Bourbon Restoration. The King created him a Knight of the Royal and Military Order of Saint Louis on 2 June, a Peer of France on 4 June, grand officer of the Legion of Honour and Commander of the 19th Military Division on 14 July. At the same time his father-in-law, Count Beugnot, was appointed director of the police. Curial became the grand cross of the Legion of Honour on 14 February 1815 and was created gentleman of the king's chamber. On his return from the island of Elba and the start of the Hundred Days, Curial was out of favour with Napoleon. He was relieved of command of the chasseurs de la Garde, which was entrusted to General Charles Antoine Morand and was ordered to go to Lyon to serve in the Army of the Alps under the orders of Marshal Louis-Gabriel Suchet. The Emperor did not call him to the newly created House of Peers.

== Second Bourbon restoration and later life ==
After Napoleon's defeat and exile, Curial had his civil and military dignities reinstated. Employed in the army as Inspector General of Infantry, he resumed his seat as a peer at the Luxembourg Palace, where he voted for exile in the trial of Marshal Michel Ney. In 1823 Curial commanded the 5th division deployed to Catalonia as part of the Hundred Thousand Sons of Saint Louis, under the orders of Marshal Bon-Adrien Jeannot de Moncey. He distinguished himself on 9 July at the attack at Molins de Rei, near Barcelona, and several times engaged the garrison of the city in several sorties. His favour increased at court, and he was appointed commander of St. Louis on 20 August 1823, and first chamberlain and grand master of the king's wardrobe. In this capacity he attended, on 29 May 1825, the Coronation of Charles X. Curial suffered a serious fall during the trip to Reims. His health steadily deteriorated thereafter, forcing him into retirement.

Curial remained loyal to Charles X, despite the monarch's decreasing popularity. As revolution threatened, Curial opposed the appointment of Marshal Auguste de Marmont to command Paris's defence, and warned the king not to place his confidence in him. Curial did not live to see the July Revolution, dying in Paris on 30 May 1829. His name is one of those inscribed under the Arc de Triomphe, in Column 17, on the eastern pillar.

== Family and issue ==
Curial married Clémentine Marie Amélie Beugnot (1788-1840) in Paris on 14 March 1808. Clémentine was the daughter of State Councilor Count Beugnot. The two had three children together:

- Napoléon Joseph (1809-1861), 2nd count Curial (1829), cavalry officer, general councillor of Orne, peer of France (1835), mayor of Alençon, deputy of Orne, and senator of the Second Empire (1852). He married, on 26 March 1832, Louise Félicie Gérard, and had an issue.
- Marie Clémentine (1812-1889), married Louis Gabriel Le Duc, Marquis de Saint-Clou.
- Adolphe Philibert (1814-1873), viscount Curial, married, on 20 February 1841, Marie Françoise Le Pileur de Brévannes (1821-1871), and had issue.
