= Napoléon Joseph Curial =

French peer and politician

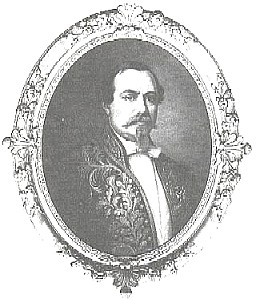

Member of the Chamber of Peers
- In office 23 March 1835 – 24 February 1848

Member for Orne of the Constituent Assembly
- In office 23 April 1848 – 6 May 1849

Member for Orne of the Legislative Assembly
- In office 13 May 1849 – 2 December 1851

Senator
- In office 26 January 1852 – 23 September 1861

Personal details
- Born: 9 January 1809 Paris, France
- Died: 22 September 1861 (aged 52) Paris, France

Napoléon Joseph Curial (9 January 1809 – 22 September 1861) was a French peer and politician.

== Early years (1809–48) ==
Napoléon Joseph Curial was born in Paris on 9 January 1809. His family originated in Savoy. His parents were Count Philibert Jean-Baptiste François Joseph Curial (1774–1829) and Clémentine Amélie Beugnot (1788–1840). His father was a general in the First French Empire and earned a well deserved reputation in the battles of Austerlitz, Eylau, Friedland and Essling. Under the Bourbon Restoration his father was named a Peer of France, and died in 1829 after falling from a horse.

Napoléon Joseph Curial was admitted as a page to King Louis XVIII, then at the age of 16 entered the École spéciale militaire de Saint-Cyr. Two years later he left the school in 1827 as a second lieutenant in the mounted grenadiers of the Royal Guard. He served with distinction in the invasion of Algiers in 1830, where he earned promotion to lieutenant.

After the July Revolution of 1830 Curial retired from the army and devoted himself to agriculture and horse breeding. On 26 March 1832 he married Louise Félicie Gérard (died 1869) in Alençon. Their son was Count Henri Napoléon Claude 'Philibert' Curial (1835–1904). On 23 March 1835 he was admitted to the Chamber of Peers on a hereditary basis. He became a member of the General Council of Orne, and in 1843 was appointed Mayor of Alençon. He was made a Knight of the Legion of Honour on 5 May 1847.

== Second Republic (1848–51) ==
After the February Revolution of 1848 Curial was dismissed from his post as Mayor. On 23 April 1848 he was elected Representative of Orne in the Constituent Assembly. He sat with the Right group and was a member of the War Committee and the Departmental and Communal Administration Committee. He was elected President of the Departmental Council of Orne on 21 November 1848 and held this office until 26 August 1861. In the Assembly Curial voted to maintain the guarantee of newspapers, against the right to work, against the progressive tax, for the amendment of Prosper Duvergier de Hauranne on the two Chambers, against the Jules Grévy amendment on the presidency, for military replacement, for the Rateau proposal, against reduction of the salt tax and for suppression of clubs.

Curial was reelected as representative of Orne in the Legislative Assembly on 13 May 1849. He was a consistent supporter of Louis Napoleon Bonaparte. He voted for the educational laws, against universal suffrage and for the Roman expedition.

== Later career (1851–61) ==
After the coup d'état of 2 December 1851 Curial was appointed to the advisory committee. On 26 January 1852 he was named on the first list of senators of the Second French Empire. He was a Senator from until his death in Paris on 22 September 1861.

== Sources ==
- Liste des présidents du Conseil départemental de l'Orne (in French), Conseil départemental de l'Orne
- Napoléon, Joseph Curial (in French), Assemblée nationale
- Rivallain, François, "Napoléon Joseph Curial", Geneanet
- Robert, Adolphe; Cougny, Gaston (1889–1891), "Curial, Napoleon Joseph", in Edgar Bourloton (ed.), Dictionnaire des Parlementaires français (1789–1889) (in French)
- Société de l'histoire de France (1863), "M. le comte Curial", Bulletin de la Société de l'histoire de France (in French), J. Renouard
