= Jules Néraud =

French botanist

Jules Néraud (9 April 1795, in La Châtre – 11 April 1855, in La Châtre) was a French botanist, who collected spermatophytes in France, Mauritius, and Réunion, but is best known as a friend of George Sand.
