= Marc Caussidière =

French police chief (1808–1861)

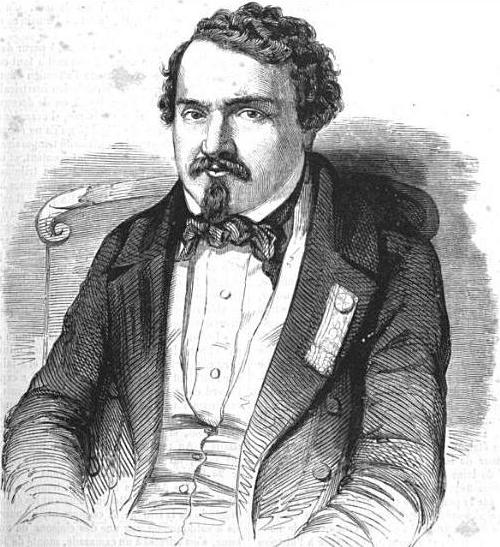
Marc Caussidière, 1848

Marc Caussidière (French pronunciation: [maʁk kosidjɛʁ]; 18 May 1808 – 27 January 1861) was a significant personality of the French republican movement of the first half of the 19th century.

== Biography ==
Caussidière was born in Geneva. Employed at Saint-Étienne, he took part in the Lyon insurgency of 1834 (in which his brother died). He was sentenced to 20 years in detention but he was pardoned in 1837. Afterward he became a broker and also distributed wines during his travels with the progressive newspaper La Réforme.

During the French Revolution of 1848, he fought on the barricades, seized the police headquarters and was appointed prefect of police by the provisional government. He replaced city sergeants with the guardians of Paris and created the body of the "Guard of the People", composed of all revolutionary elements recently released. The guard consisted of four companies (La Montagnarde, Saint-Just, February and Morisset). Beginning in May 1848, the Commission tried unsuccessfully to eliminate the prefecture of police. After the failure of the invasion of the National Assembly on 15 May 1848, he was dismissed from his position as prefect of police by the executive Commission. He resigned his tenure as deputy to the Constituent Assembly. In the elections of early June he was reelected but after the failure of the June Days Uprising, he was forced to flee and took refuge in England and the USA where he resumed his activities as a wine broker. Sentenced in absentia to deportation by the High Court of Justice Bourges for his participation in the demonstration on 15 May 1848, he returned to France after the amnesty of 1859.

He wrote Memoirs. He died, aged 52, in Paris.

== See also ==
- French demonstration of 15 May 1848
- Georges Danton
