= Le Puy Mine =

Ancient lead mine in France

Coordinates: 45.5156°N 0.7022°E

The le Puy Mine is an ancient lead mine in the northwestern Massif Central, France. The mine produced mainly silver-bearing galena.

== Geography ==
The Le Puy Mine, in French Les Mines du Puy, was named after the hamlet Le Puy. It is situated roughly 4 km southeast of Nontron on the right-hand side of the D 707 from Nontron to Saint-Pardoux-la-Rivière, at an elevation of 280 m (920 ft) above sealevel. The mine belongs to the commune of Nontron.

== Geology ==
The mine is implanted in Neoproterozoic, fine-grained paragneisses structurally belonging to the Saint-Mathieu Dome, an upwarp in the metamorphic basement rocks. The mine followed a 0.50-to-1.20 m-wide (1.6-to-3.9 ft) lode close to the SSE-striking border fault. The vertical to steeply North dipping, mineralized lode is striking N 115 to N 120.

== Mineralogy ==
The matrix of the lode consists of quartz and baryte, in some places only of baryte. The lode contains as ore minerals the sulfides galena, sphalerite, marcasite and pyrite as well as the lead alteration mineral cerussite. Galena and sphalerite are silver-bearing. The silver concentration in galena varies between 112 and 400 grams per ton, exceptionally reaching values as high as 1708 g/t. The silver concentration in sphalerite is 946 g/t.

=== Minerals ===
- baryte (BaSO_{4}): common matrix mineral; occurs normally in its leafy habit, in some places forming hemispherical clusters; crystals are up to 1 cm in size.
- cerussite (PbCO_{3}): fairly rare; formed from galena by alteration; usually encountered in geodes at the top of the lode (oxidation zone).
- galena (PbS): most common ore mineral; massive or in big cubes; can completely fill veins.
- marcasite (FeS_{2}): quite common; forms powdery crusts; crystals in cock's comb habit.
- pyrite (FeS_{2}): less common; associated with galena and baryte.
- quartz (SiO_{2}): most common matrix mineral; massive; occurs occasionally in geodes; short prisms; fills veins and lodes that are most often strongly jointed.
- sphalerite (ZnS): less common; forms dense encrustations.

== History ==
Works started at the Le Puy Mine in 1899, they lasted with several interruptions till 1935. The main shaft, called Sainte-Louise, was 75 metres deep and deserved 4 levels of excavation. Besides the main shaft there existed two other shafts. By 1901 a 760 m-long (2,490 ft) horizontal drainage shaft was installed, which led from the lowermost excavation level back to daylight. In its course it crossed several veins and also the Pré Granger Lode. The mined ore was washed in place and then taken by horse or ox cart to the train station in Nontron, where it was shipped by train to Marseille or Nantes for further treatment. Today all the shafts including the drainage shaft are filled in and the headframe has been dismantled. The house with its machine room and the bunker containing the dynamite are still standing. Two partially ruined wash basins can also be seen.

== Mined tonnage ==
Altogether the Le Puy Mine yielded 1000 (metric) tons of lead at a concentration of 65 to 75%, 100 tons of zinc at a concentration of 45 to 50%, 100 tons of pyrite at a concentration of 35 to 50% and 200 kilograms of silver.

Whether there are still extractable resources left below the 75-meter (246 ft) level is not known. There is also the possibility of stratabound ores to be present.

== Conclusions ==
The ores formed hydrothermally in a medium temperature range of 300 to 150 °C. The lodes are typical lead-zinc ores; they belong to the sphalerite-pyrite-galena-chalcopyrite association, although in Le Puy chalcopyrite is absent (in neighbouring lodes it is present). The ores most probably were exuded during the cooling process of the Piégut-Pluviers Granodiorite.

At the close of the 19th century and the beginning of the 20th century the Le Puy Mine was together with Poullaouen and Huelgoat in Finistère, Vialas in Lozère, Pontgibaud in Puy-de-Dôme and Pontpéan in Ille-et-Vilaine one of the most important lead mines in France.

== See also ==
- Cantonnier Lode
- Neuil mine
- Tabataud Quarry

== Literature ==
- Floc'h, J.-P. et al. Feuille Nontron. Carte Géologique de la France à 1/50 000. BRGM.
- Legrand, N., Faure, E. & Lebocey, J. (2008). Minéralogie des Mines du Nontronnais, Dordogne. Le Règne Minéral. Vol. 84, p. 5 – 22.
