= Neuil mine =

Coordinates: 45.5028°N 0.7175°E

The Neuil Mine, in French Mine de Neuil, is a mine emplaced in paragneisses of the northwestern Massif Central. The mine is part of the commune of Saint-Pardoux-la-Rivière in the Dordogne. Extracted from the mine was galena, slightly enriched in silver.

== Geography ==
The mine is situated about 1 kilometer north of Neuil, a small hamlet in the commune of Saint-Pardoux-la-Rivière. The main production shaft, at an elevation of 250 meters above sea level, can be reached by following a small valley on the left side of the D 707 Nontron- Thiviers just before arriving at Neuil. The shaft is located on the right-hand side of the small stream; it is fenced in and closed to the public because of its hazardous nature.

== Mine works ==
The partially collapsed main shaft was once 47.50 meters deep and led to three exploitation levels. An additional horizontal access is now flooded.

The ore was taken to Nègrecombe, washed and then transported by train (on the now redundant railway line Angoulême-Thiviers) to a smelting plant.

== History ==
The mine was in operation mainly between 1921 and 1928, between 1956 and 1959 and once more between 1976 and 1984. Several hundred tons of ore were mined. The reserves are estimated at several thousand tons.

== Geology ==
The Neuil Mine is emplaced in Neoproterozoic paragneisses of the Variscan basement of the northwestern Massif Central. The in places tightly folded paragneisses strike mainly N 130 and dip 35° to the northeast. The ore-bearing lodes crosscut the strike of the paragneisses, their orientation varying between N 045 and N 065. Their dip is generally 65° to the north. The lodes are therefore roughly parallel with the boundary fault of the Massif Central north of Saint-Pardoux-la-Rivière.

The lodes of the Neuil Mine are no single occurrence. To the northwest (towards Nontron) several other lodes follow, which were also mined (Le Puy Mine, Cantonnier Lode, Tabataud Quarry among others).

== Mineralogy ==
The central part of the lode consists of a quartz matrix enriched more or less in baryte. The baryte can become very abundant so that it completely replaces the quartz. Abundant fractures cut through the quartz-baryte core. The sulfides galena, sphalerite and marcasite are enclosed within the quartz/baryte. The galena forms mats of octahedral crystals, the sphalerite is dense and anhedral and the marcasite powdery or displays its coxcomb habit. The lodes are mylonitized at the edges; the sulfide mineral aggregates within this zone are sheared. Secondary mineralisations cover the central fracture surfaces and the mylonitic edges. In the core region geodes of quartz and of chalcedony can occur. In the quartz geodes the habit of quartz is hexagonal-pyramidal but can show occasional bipyramids. Druses in baryte can be clad with gypsum. Apple green pyromorphite occurs forming hexagonal prisms.

The mineralisation is due to hydrothermal circulation in the temperature range 150 – 300 °C. The ores were deposited in two stages, each with a characteristic paragenesis: a higher temperature stage with galena and quartz and a lower temperature stage with baryte and marcasite. These minerals are accompanied by sphalerite, pyrite and chalcopyrite. The ore therefore belongs to the mineralisation type sphalerite-pyrite-galena-chalcopyrite.

== Age ==
A radiometric lead isotope study on the basement lodes yielded an age of 300 to 250 million years BP (Lougnon, J. et al. 1974). The lodes belong clearly to a late Variscan phase and were definitely formed after the intrusion of the Piégut-Pluviers Granodiorite into the paragneisses during the late Pennsylvanian (elsewhere lodes can be found that also formed within the granodiorite). Yet the metal impregnation is most likely genetically related to the granodiorite.

== Conclusion ==
The spatial arrangement of the lodes points towards local southeasterly extension within the basement rocks. By that time the paragneisses had cooled down to below 300 °C. Additionally the lodes experienced shearing motions as shown be the mylonitized edges. This fact combined with the variations in strike possibly hints at a shear zone oriented southeast: the lodes following N 065 can then be interpreted as antithetic surfaces, whereas the lodes following N 045 are probably R'- Riedel shears. Furthermore the fairly steep northwesterly dip of the lodes hints at a top to the southeast sense of motion ("bookshelfing").

The mineralizing hydrothermal solutions most likely came from the Piégut-Pluviers Granodiorite.

== Literature ==
- Guillot, P. - L. et al. Feuille Thiviers. Carte géologique de la France à 1/50000. BRGM
- Legrand, N. et al. (2008). Minéralogie des Mines du Nontronnais, Dordogne. Le Règne Minéral, vol. 84, Munich.
