= Cantonnier Lode =

Mineral-bearing rock formation in France

Coordinates: 45°31′37″N 00°41′11″E

The Cantonnier lode formed in the Piégut-Pluviers Granodiorite, part of the basement rocks of the northwestern Massif Central in France. Its importance is highlighted by very rare mineral parageneses.

== Geography ==
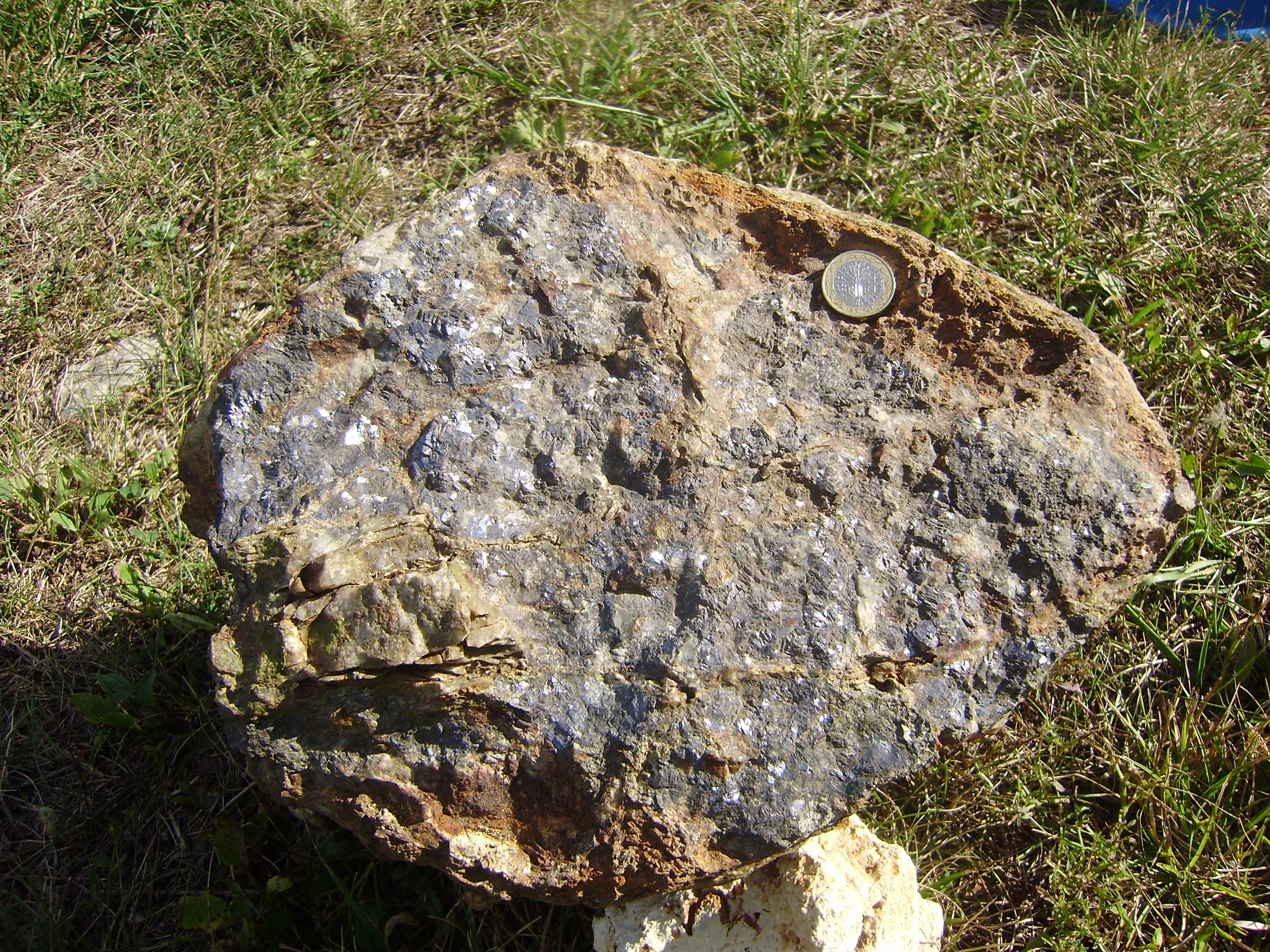
Massive galena coating of the 20 centimetre wide northern quartz band

The lode lies about 2 kilometers east of the town of Nontron, the northern subpréfecture of the Dordogne. It can be reached via a small left side stream of the Bandiat River; the stream starts at the hamlet of Brégout, flows to the Northwest past the lode and merges just upstream from Moulin de Bord with the Bandiat. Higher up on its left hillslope passes the D 707 from Nontron to Saint-Pardoux-la-Rivière. The lode is known to be at least 70 meters long ending at an elevation of 185 meters near the left bank of the stream.

== Geology ==
The nearly vertical lode strikes east-northeast (N 065) and is enclosed in the southern rim facies of the Piégut-Pluviers Granodiorite. Only a mere 1000 meters farther to the southeast country rocks (plagioclase-bearing paragneisses) are already encountered. The host granodiorite appears in its darker, finer-grained hornblende facies with amphibole and biotite. The rim facies has a much more mafic chemistry than the ordinary, coarser-grained facies to the North.

As one approaches the lode the granodiorite becomes mylonitized and is traversed by veinlets covered in pyromorphite. The lode itself is not wider than 60 centimeters and shows an asymmetric arrangement. The 25 centimeter wide contact zone on the south flank is composed of massive, nonmineralized quartz. Only some joints are covered in pyromorphite and crocoite. To the north follows a 10 centimeter wide band of white, powdery mylonite very rich in pyromorphite and crocoite. Next comes a 5 centimeter wide quartz band in boxwork facies, that is also very rich in the secondary minerals pyromorphite and crocoite. The crocoite appears skeletal and the pyromorphite acicular. The lode terminates on its north side with a 20 centimeter wide quartz band strongly mineralized in galena and sphalerite. Cross-joints show beautiful pyromorphite and crocoite, occasionally also cerussite.

The Piégut-Pluviers granodiorite formed at the end of the Variscan orogeny in the Massif Central and is dated as Pennsylvanian ( Serpukhovian) at 325 million years BP. It is assumed that the lode was emplaced during the distensive cooling phase of the granodiorite, supported by a lead isotope date of 300 to 250 million years BP. The Cantonnier lode is not a singular occurrence but rather is accompanied by several other lodes, which were mineralized at the same time. For example, the little side stream valley is traversed by a 3 kilometer long, southeast striking lode which was also mined (the so-called Filon des Anciens). The lodes are not restricted to the granodiorite, but can also be found in its hosting paragneisses (lodes of the Le Puy mine and the Neuil mine).

== Mineralogy ==
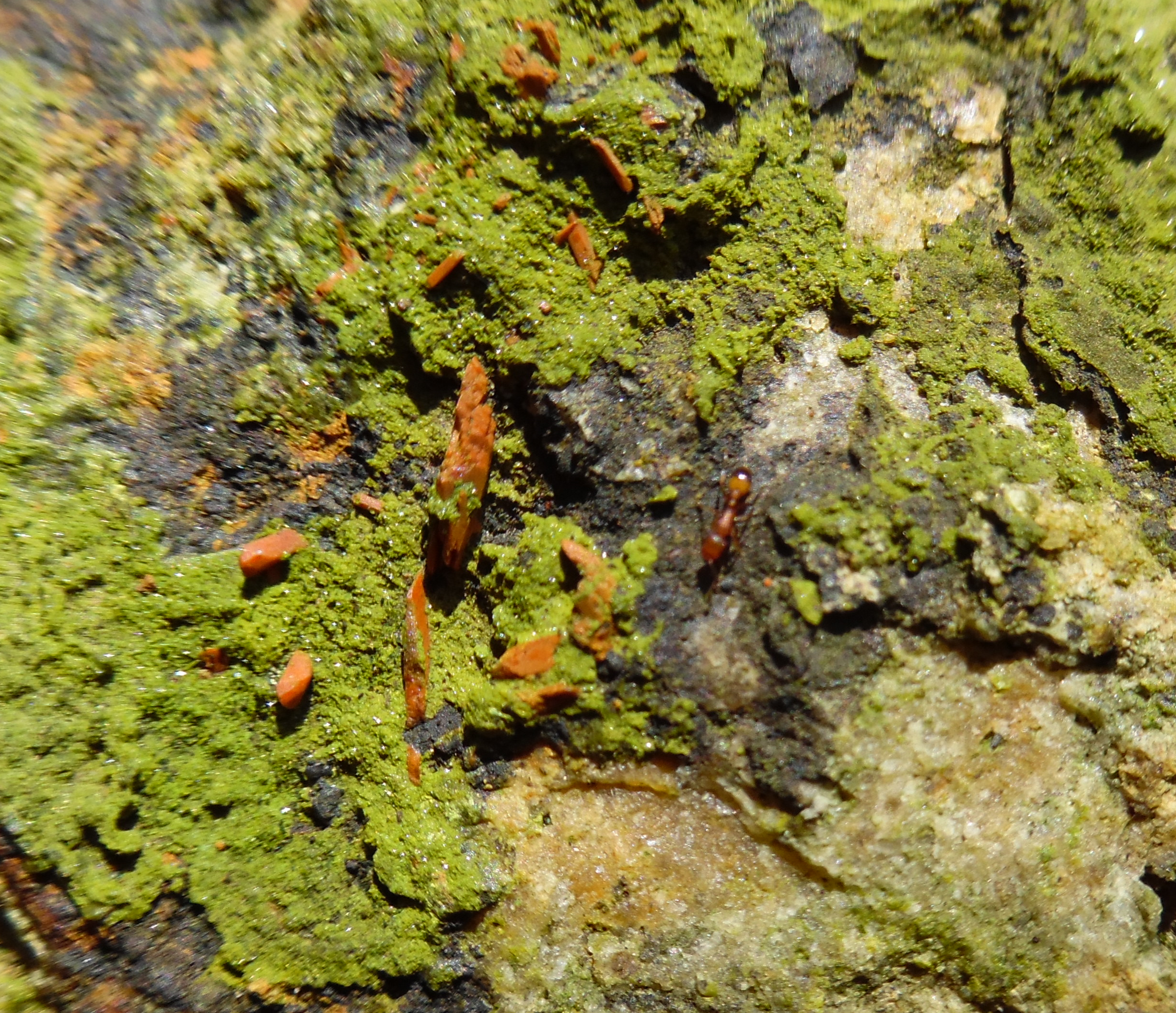
Orange crocoite tablets and green pyromorphite on galena. The scale is given by the ant.

Besides the nearly ubiquitous quartz more common minerals in the lode are baryte, calcite, chalcedony, finely disseminated chalcopyrite and nickel-bearing pyrite (variety bravoite). Primary ore minerals are silver-bearing galena and sphalerite; traces of native silver have also been found. Of great importance are the numerous secondary ore minerals, amongst them some very rare species. Besides cerussite, crocoite and pyromorphite appear anglesite, embreyite, hisingerite and mimetesite. Most likely dundasite, leadhillite, vauquelinite and wulfenite are also present (need confirming).

== History ==
Mining in the Nontronnais goes back to the end of the 17th century. The exploitation of the neighbouring lode Filon des Anciens is documented for the end of the 18th century. At the Cantonnier lode work started during the 1890s. A 75 meter long shaft was excavated in the hillside. But these activities must have been of rather short duration, because already in 1916 it was reported that the shaft had filled in again. In 1965 the BRGM (French mining authority) reopened the shaft and it was at that occasion that the mineral crocoite was discovered. Besides this reconnaissance no further works were undertaken and the mine filled in once more. Today hardly any ore material is left.

== Formation ==
The physical conditions reigning during the formation of the lode can be judged by the existing mineral parageneses. The primary lead-zinc-silver association indicates hydrothermal deposits of a medium temperature range (300 to 150 °C). The secondary minerals must have formed in a cooler environment closer to the surface (oxidation zone).

The mylonites within and near the lode implicate tectonic movements during the emplacement of the lode, most likely shearing due to bookshelving (if one assumes an overall dextral shear zone oriented northwest–southeast, which not only affected the country rocks but also the granodiorite)

== Conclusions ==
The lode clearly consists of a magmatic lead-zinc-association (more precisely a sphalerite-pyrite-galena-chalcopyrite association) enriched in silver. The importance of the Cantonnier-lode lies in the diversity of its secondary alteration minerals, some very rare species being present. Amongst these galena-derived lead minerals we find chromates (crocoite, embreyite and vauquelinite), arsenates (mimetesite) and molybdates (wulfenite). Vauquelinite indicates the presence of copper.

Arsenates and molybdates are not foreign to the Massif Central, which was mineralized in those two element groups at the end of the Variscan orogeny. In certain places the arsenates and molybdates were also accompanied by gold.

The chromates and copper are rather unusual and pose a problem. Normally chromates are associated with oceanic and ultramafic rocks like serpentinites or metagabbros. The closest occurrence of such rocks can only be found in the Sarrazac massif 25 kilometers farther to the east-southeast (near Saint-Paul-la-Roche, Jumilhac-le-Grand and Sarrazac), their geological setting being very different to that of the local granodiorite. Another source possibly are the Merlis Serpentinites. Maybe an answer to this dilemma can be found within the dark border facies of the granodiorite itself, which locally can produce very fine, dark, microdioritic rocks that almost resemble amphibolites in their appearance.

== See also ==
- Le Puy mine
- Neuil mine
- Piégut-Pluviers Granodiorite
- Tabataud Quarry

== Literature ==
- Cuchet, S., Ansermet, S. & Meisser, N. (2008). L'embreyite et l'hisingerite du filon du Cantonnier, Nontron, Dordogne. Le Règne Minéral, vol. 84, p. 23 – 24.
- J.-P. Floc'h et al. Feuille Nontron. Carte géologique de la France à 1/50 000. BRGM. Orleans.
- Laurent, Y. et al.(1967). La crocoïte de Nontron (Dordogne) et les minéraux associés. Bulletin de la Société Française de Minéralogie et Cristallographie, vol. XC, n° 3, p. 377 – 382.
- Legrand, N., Faure, E. & Lebocey, J. (2008). Minéralogie des Mines du Nontronnais, Dordogne. Le Règne Minéral, vol. 84, p. 5 – 22.
