= Merlis Serpentinites =

Aligned group of small serpentinite outcrops in the northwestern

Coordinates: 45°45′00″N 0°49′56″E

The Merlis Serpentinites are an aligned group of small serpentinite outcrops in the northwestern French Massif Central. Their parent rocks were peridotites from the upper mantle.

== Type locality ==
The serpentinites are named after their type locality, the little hamlet Merlis (also written Merly) near Vayres in the Haute-Vienne department.

== Geography and geology ==
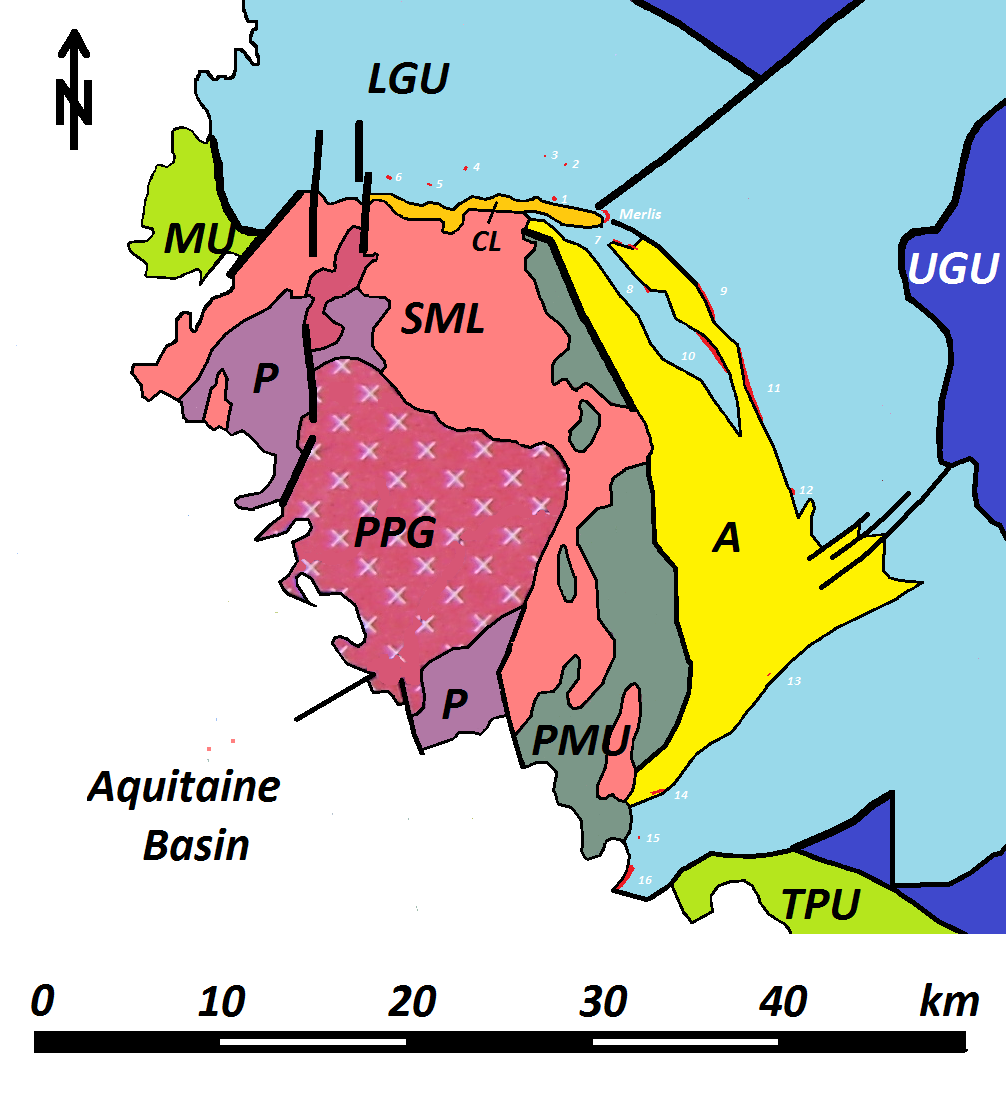
Geological map showing the serpentinite outcrops

The biggest outcrop of these serpentinites is situated east of Merlis, where the rock was once mined in two quarries. In map view it forms a crescent opening to the west, which measures just over a kilometre in longitudinal and 400 meters in latitudinal direction. Starting from the type locality several outcrops follow like beads on a string in a westerly direction, for example at Puytreillard west of Vayres, Les Soumagnes and Bonnefont northwest of Vayres, Bellevue southwest of Saint-Gervais, Gélisant southeast of Verneuil and Le Cluzeau near Massignac. Immediately north of the type locality are three small separate occurrences.

Serpentinite bodies can also be found southeast of Merlis, like near Saint-Bazile and Oradour-sur-Vayres, Champagnac-la-Rivière (with six small bodies), La Martinie (south of Champagnac-la-Rivière), La Boissonnie and Lageyrat (west of Châlus) and La Rougerie (east of Dournazac). Slightly off-set to the northwest are two occurrences near Cussac.

It is possible to prolong the southeastern branch farther to the SSW including the serpentinites from Chevalerie (west of La Coquille), Comboux (southwest of Saint-Jory-de-Chalais) and Le Suquet (northwest of Saint-Martin-de-Fressengeas). The chain ends with the metaharzburgite of La Rebière (southeast of Saint-Martin-de-Fressengeas), which still shows its original magmatic foliation and also most of its original mineralogy.

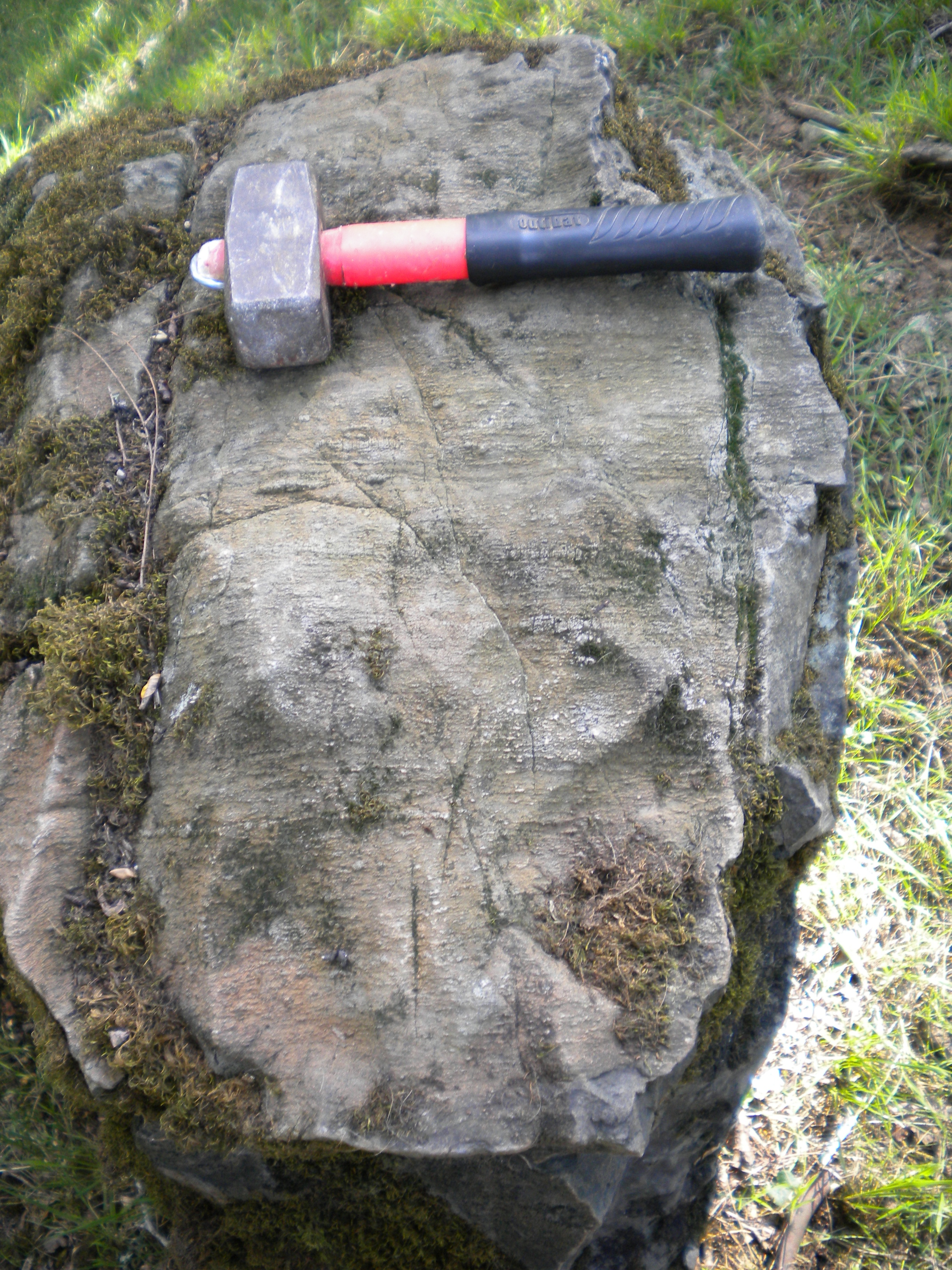
The La Rebière metaharzburgite. The steeply south dipping (top of picture) magmatic foliation parallels the hammer handle.

The western branch is about 13 kilometers long, whereas the southeastern branch measures 38 kilometers.

All the serpentinite bodies are found within the Lower Gneiss Unit (LGU), a basement thrust nappe of the northwestern Massif central. The type locality and the western branch are tectonically emplaced in the lower plagioclase-bearing paragneisses. These outcrops are spatially very close to the northern edge of the Chéronnac Leucogranite, a Pennsylvanian leucogranite with a very pronounced, east-west-striking foliation. The only exception are the serpentinites from Les Soumagnes and Bonnefont situated somewhat farther north and which are already associated with leptynitic gneisses. The southeastern branch generally overlies leptynitic augen gneisses folded into the paragneisses.

== Lithology and mineralogy ==
The Merlis serpentinites are ultrabasic rocks with very low SiO_{2}-contents of about 40% (weight percent) and a very high MgO-contents of 35%. They also tie up within their minerals a lot of water (over 13%). Most likely they are derived from hydrated mantle rocks, probably harzburgites or lherzolites. This is underlined by the presence of the metaharzburgite from La Rebière in the south. According to the degree of deformation and metamorphism the rocks can take on very different appearances. Generally one is able to distinguish two end member types:

- massive type
- foliated type

=== Massive serpentinite ===
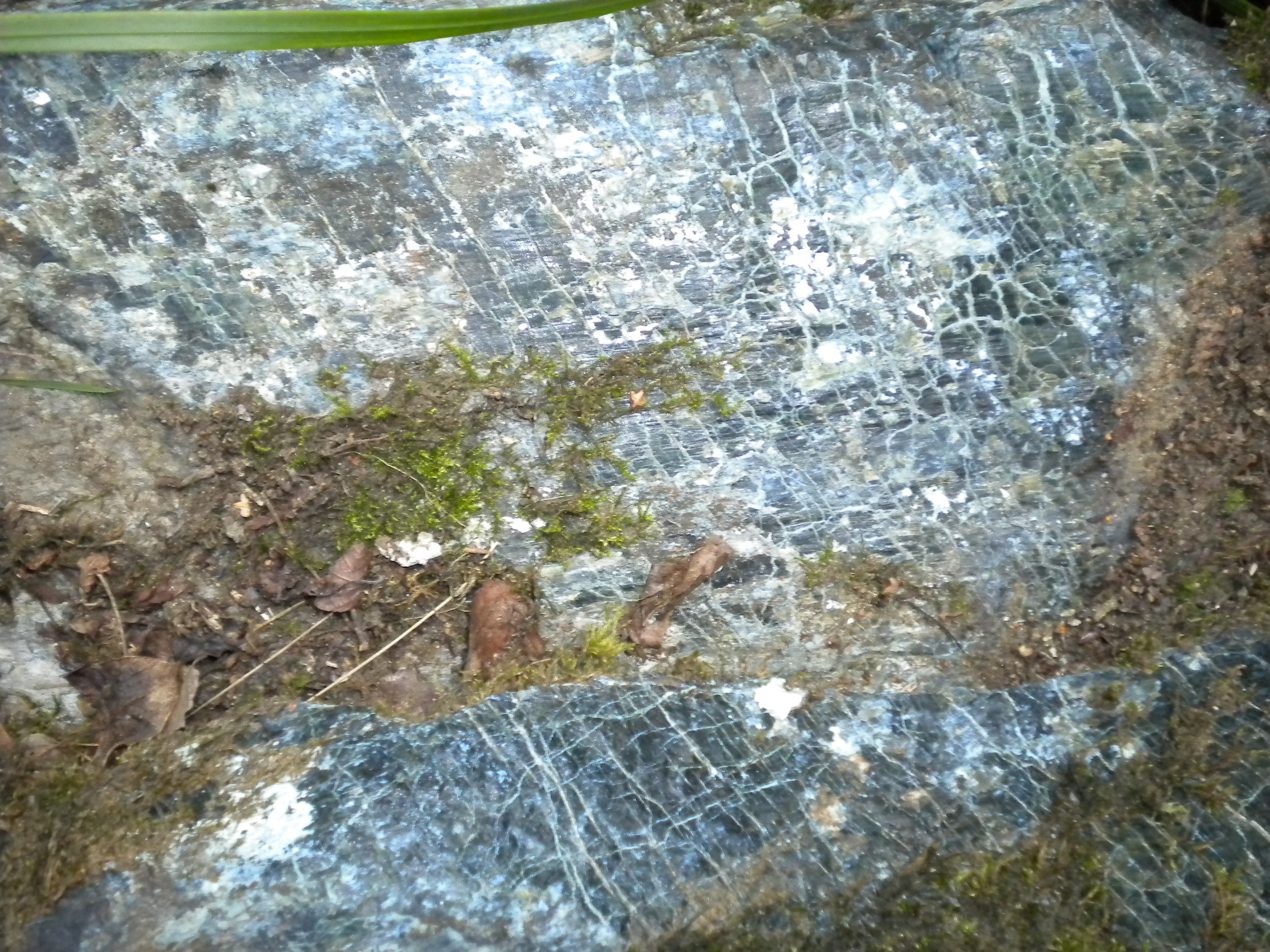
Serpentinite from the type locality Merlis with characteristic mesh texture on a fault plane

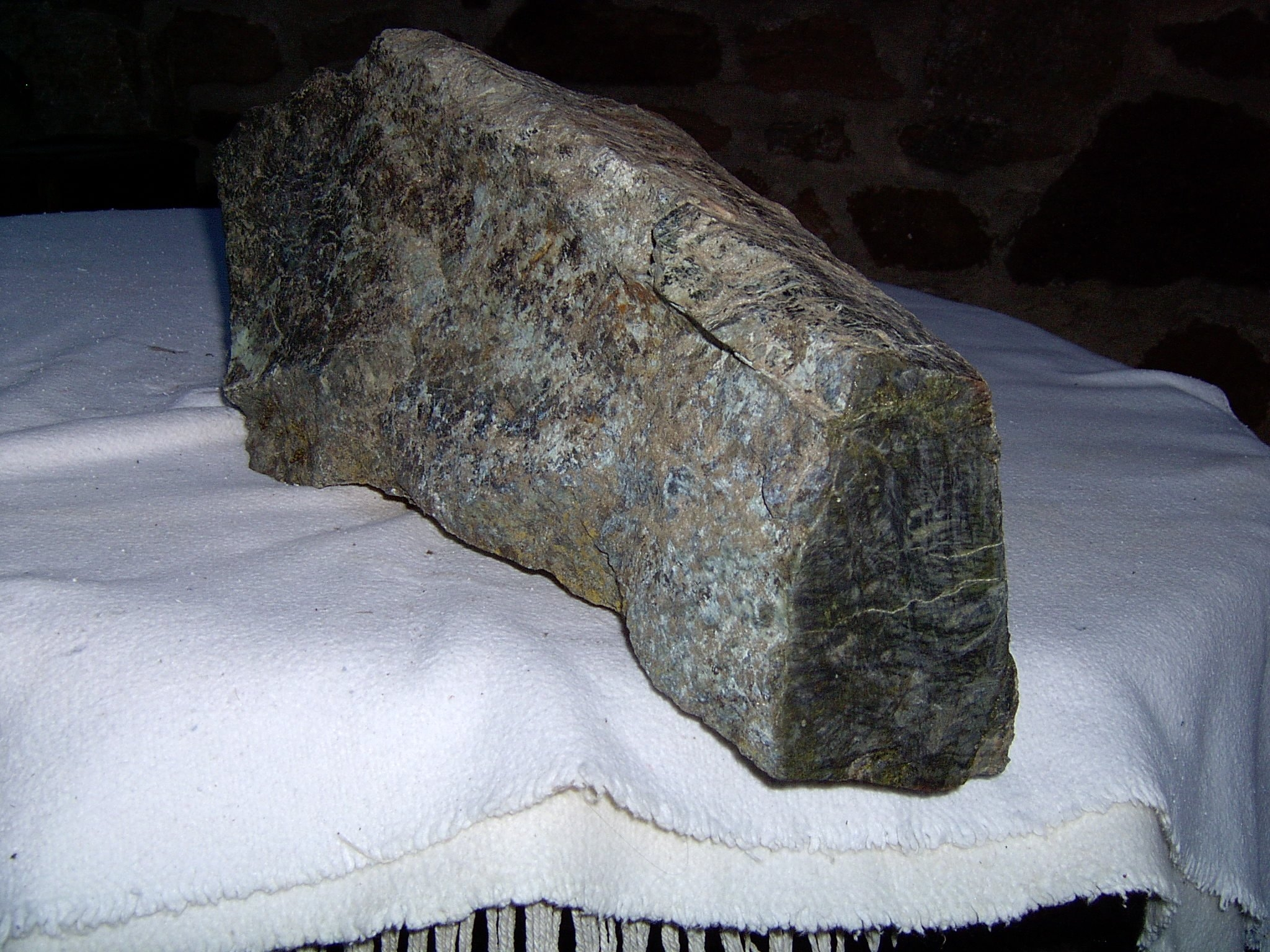
Massive serpentinite with a marble-like texture. Sawn hand sample from the type locality

The massive, dark green to black serpentinites most closely resemble their peridotitic protoliths. The comparatively weakly deformed metaharzburgite from La Rebière for instance weathers with the typical orange-brown colour of peridotites and under the microscope still shows crystals defining a hypersthene peridotite (olivine, orthopyroxene (hypersthene), spinel and salitic-diopsidic clinopyroxene). Massive serpentinites to the north exhibit bronzite, augite and brown spinel.

The massive serpentinites disintegrate into blocks bounded by straight to slightly curved joint surfaces coated with silky serpentine minerals. Often these surfaces are slickensided and represent therefore movement planes (faults). In the interior of these rocks one can discern mainly black (changing to grey on the exterior) vein networks exhibiting a metallic luster due to magnetite. They are contrasted by light green, 2 to 10 millimeter-sized rectangular to oval areas completely composed of bastitized pyroxenes. Recognizable are furthermore 0.5 to 3 millimeter long, grey to black crystals of spinel rimmed by light grey magnesium-rich chlorite.

Strongly deformed and serpentinized rocks appear marble-like due to interchanging dark green and light green areas. Crosscutting veins are mainly mineralized by serpentine minerals (like cross fibers of chrysotile) and magnetite.

Under the microscope the following minerals can be identified:

- antigorite
- chrysotile
- colourless, magnesium-rich chlorite (pennine)
- opaque magnetite

Porphyroblasts of the parent rocks appear only ghost-like as they have been replaced by a fibrous mesh of tremolite-actinolite, Mg-chlorite, serpentine minerals and talc (bastitization). Magnetite substituted for the original chromium spinel.

The serpentinite from Puytreillard is a banded variety with interchanging centimeter-scale dark and light layers. The dark bands are composed of completely pseudomorphosed olivine (replaced by antigorite, reddish iddingsite, Mg-chlorite and magnetite), whereas the light bands consist of tremolite fibers, Mg-chlorite and magnetite. The parent rock of this banded variety most likely was a pyroxenite enclosing cumulate layers of dunite.

=== Foliated serpentinites ===
With increasing serpentinization knot-like clusters of colourless, magnesium-rich chlorite, meshes of serpentine minerals, and felt-like aggregates of colourless amphiboles (tremolite), talc, anthophyllite and pargasite occur.

In foliated serpentinites newly formed chlorite is more common. Chlorite grows in leaf-like layers paralleling the regional foliation. This process can even lead to chlorite schists observable at La Rougerie, Cussac, Lageyrat, La Boissonie and Champagnac-la-Rivière. These chlorite schists are cross-cut in places by asbestos veins and coated by chalcedony or quartz.

== Parent rocks ==
For the Merlis serpentinites the following parent rocks can be deduced:

- peridotites (harzburgites and lherzolites)
- magnesium-rich (allivalitic: anorthite and olivine rich) peridotites
- magnesium-rich (allivalitic) gabbros

In some places even a stratigraphic succession can be recognized starting with peridotites (now massive serpentinites) at the base followed by magnesium-rich peridotites (now retromorphosed to chlorite and tremolite schists) and finishing with gabbros (now medium-grained amphibolites) at the top.

Possibly the parent rocks underwent postmagmatic alterations before being metamorphosed.

== Chemical composition ==
As an example follows the average composition of massive Merlis serpentinites:

Oxides	Weight %	Trace elements	ppm
SiO_{2}	39,58	Ba	25
TiO_{2}	0,05	Co	99
Al_{2}O_{3}	1,26	Cr	2641
Fe_{2}O_{3}	1,11	Hf	0,1
FeO	7,36	Li	10
MnO	0,11	Nb	0,15
MgO	35,71	Ni	2084
CaO	0,32	Rb	1
Na_{2}O	0,20	Sr	8,5
K_{2}O	0,05	Ta	0,1
P_{2}O_{5}	0,05	Th	0,55
LOI	13,33	U	0,1
		V	56
		Y	1,1
		Zr	2,5

Remarkable the high contents in chromium and nickel amongst the trace elements.

== Metamorphism ==
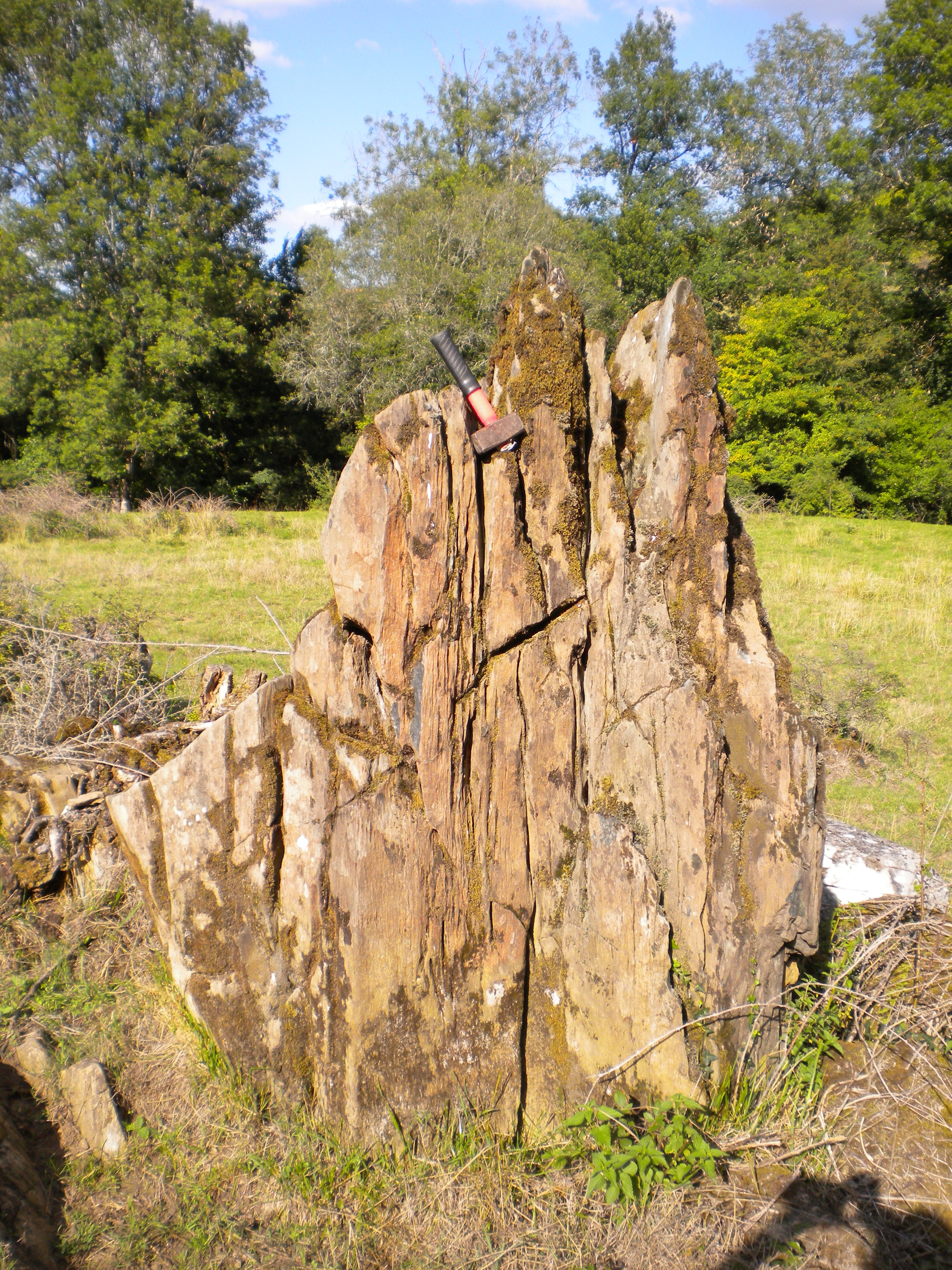
Metaharzburgite from La Rebière with the characteristic peridotite weathering and near vertical foliation

The parent rocks were serpentinized during the Variscan regional metamorphism which took place about 400 to 350 million years BP. In the Limousin the main metamorphism was mediovariscan and of the Barrovian type with medium pressure and medium to high temperature conditions (MP/MT metamorphism). It is responsible for the regional foliation. The parent rocks, which had formed under high temperatures and relatively high pressures, underwent retrograde metamorphism in several stages right down to chlorite schists as an end product. The chloritization seems to be general and can be seen to affect other basement rocks (i.e. granites and granodiorites) in the Limousin.

== Regional geological context ==
The Merlis serpentinites are tectonically emplaced as sheared lenses within paragneisses, leptynitic gneisses and augengneisses.

These bodies generally strike ESE to SSE (N 120 to N 150) in the northern branch, with a medium dip angle between 30 and 60°. In the southern branch the foliation then swings into a southwesterly direction (N 045) with a rather flat dip of about 30° to the Southeast (running parallel to the La Coquille Fault Zone).

All the occurrences in the North were strongly deformed – the only exception being the metaharzburgite at La Rebière as the southernmost outcrop. This metaharzburgite might be associated with the close by, far less metamorphic Thiviers-Payzac Unit – thus escaping the stronger metamorphism in the North.

As mentioned above the western branch of serpentinites lies spatially close to the Chéronnac Leucogranite. The southern branch overlies the leptynitic augengneisses, which in turn are thrust over the mica schists of the Parautochthonous Micaschist Unit (PMU) or the Saint-Mathieu Leucogranite.

In a wider perspective all the serpentinites rim the so-called Saint-Mathieu Dome, a dome-like basement uplift of the northwestern Massif Central. This uplift has pushed up the Parautochthonous Micaschist Unit – structurally the lowermost nappe unit below the Lower Gneiss Unit – on its eastern side.

Because of their high water contents (13 weight %) serpentinites are tectonically highly mobile rocks. Their spatial arrangement thus underlines major thrust planes bringing these mantle rocks into higher crustal levels.

== Literature ==
- Briand, Bernard et al. Feuille Châlus. Carte géologique de la France à 1/50 000. BRGM, Orléans.
- Chèvremont, P. et al. Feuille Rochechouart. Carte géologique de la France à 1/50 000. BRGM, Orléans.
- Floc'h, J.-P. et al. Feuille La Rochefoucauld. Carte géologique de la France à 1/50 000. BRGM, Orléans.
- Guillot, P.-L. et al. Feuille Thiviers. Carte géologique de la France à 1/50 000. BRGM, Orléans.
