= Paragenesis =

Sequence in which minerals form in a deposit

Paragenesis, in petrology, is the formation sequence of minerals in an ore deposit. It is used in studies of igneous and metamorphic rock genesis and importantly in studies of the hydrothermal deposition of ore minerals and the rock alteration (vein metasomatism) associated with ore mineral deposits. The concept and application of paragenesis, meaning 'born beside' in Greek, was first applied by August Breithaupt in 1849 in his work Die Paragenesis der Mineralien.

The paragenetic sequence in mineral formation is an important concept in deciphering the detailed geologic history of ore deposits and metamorphic events. The sequence is worked out through detailed microscopic studies in polished ore mineral section, petrologic thin section and fluid inclusion studies as well as macroscopic field relations.
