= Tabataud Quarry =

Quarry in France

Coordinates: 45°31′30″N 00°40′31″E

The Tabataud Quarry (sometimes also written Tabateaud) is situated in the northwestern French Massif Central. The quarry used to be mined for its granodiorite.

== Geography ==
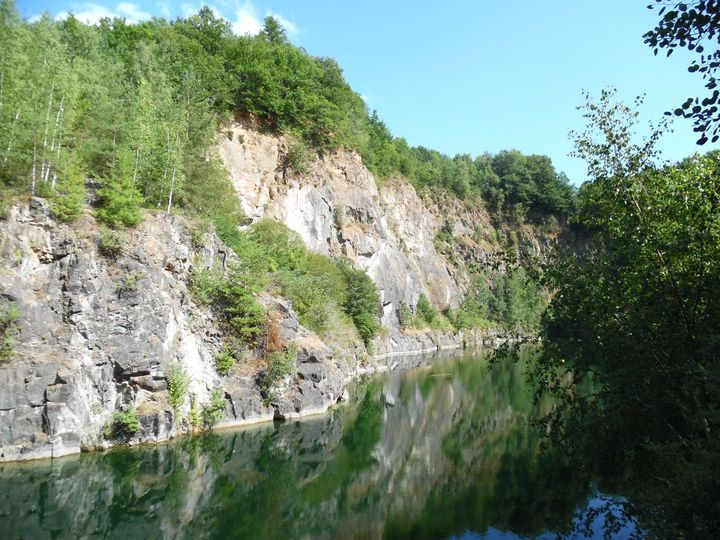
The upper part of the Tabataud quarry, which is flooded by now

The Tabataud Quarry was excavated along the left bank of the river Bandiat at an elevation of 165 metres, only about one kilometer southeast of Nontron town centre. Nearby passes the D 707 from Nontron to Saint-Pardoux-la-Rivière, from which it is easily accessible. In the immediate vicinity are two more adjoining quarries, the Maspeyrot-Lagarde quarry and the Moulin Blanc quarry, which are both older. All these quarries are closed by now and they are dangerous due to rockfall.

== Geology ==
The Tabataud quarry and its two satellites were worked from the Piégut-Pluviers Granodiorite, more precisely from its dark, fine-grained, biotite- and amphibole-bearing (green hornblende) border facies. Because of its slight blueish hue the rock used to be called granite bleu (blue granite) by the local population. Along the west side of the quarry crosses a NNE-SSW-striking fault zone that sets off the granodiorite from the plagioclase-bearing paragneisses farther west (Nontron Paragneiss). Within the quarry the granodiorite is traversed by a stockwork of mineralized dikes. Altogether 17 southeast-northwest-striking lodes are encountered. They only reach thicknesses of about 3 centimeters, an exception being the Puyssechet lode near the Moulin Blanc quarry, which is 30 cm thick and strikes east-west. Besides the lodes there are also some pegmatite dikes.

== Mineralogy ==
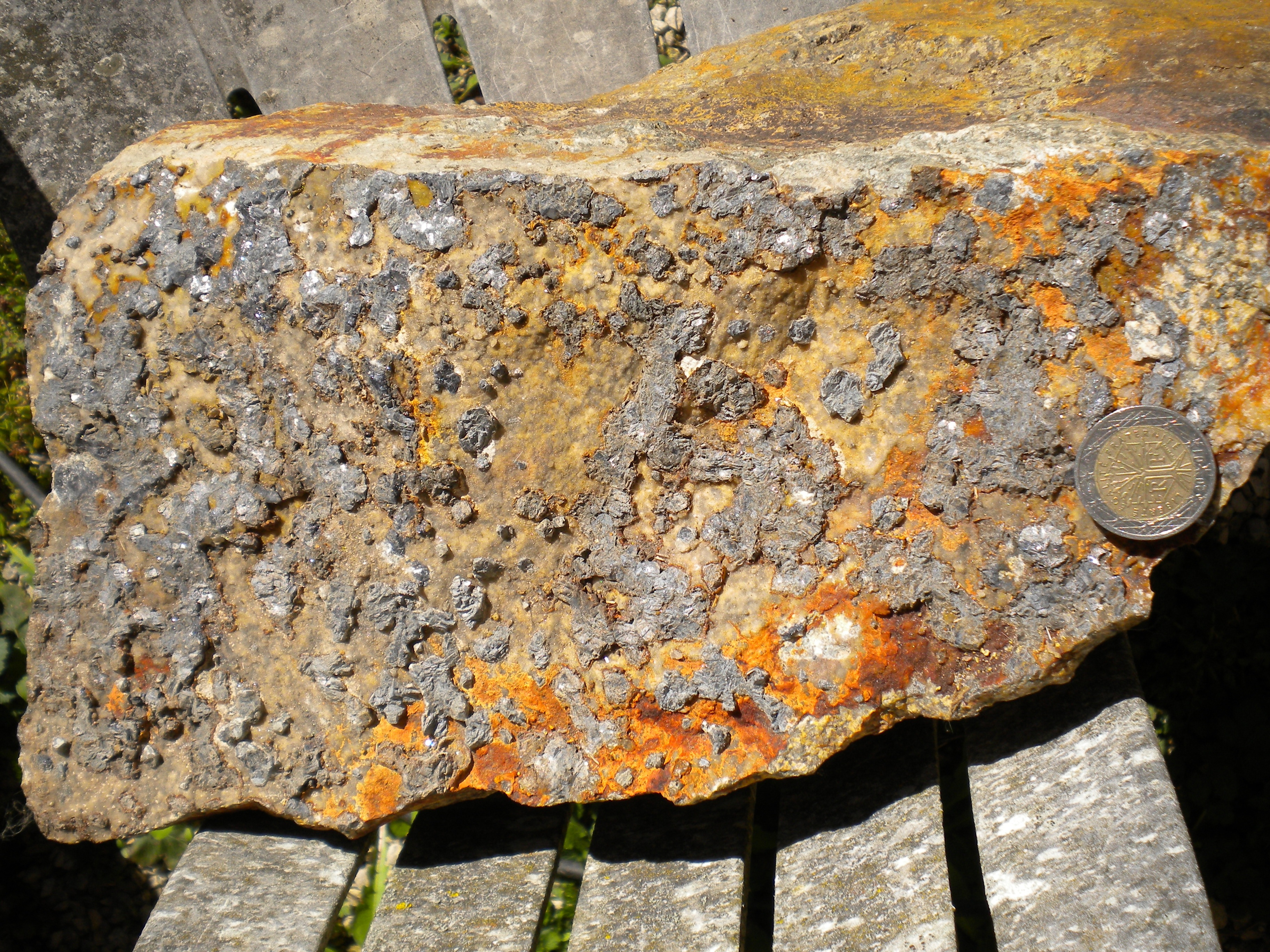
Partially weathered galena coating on granodiorite

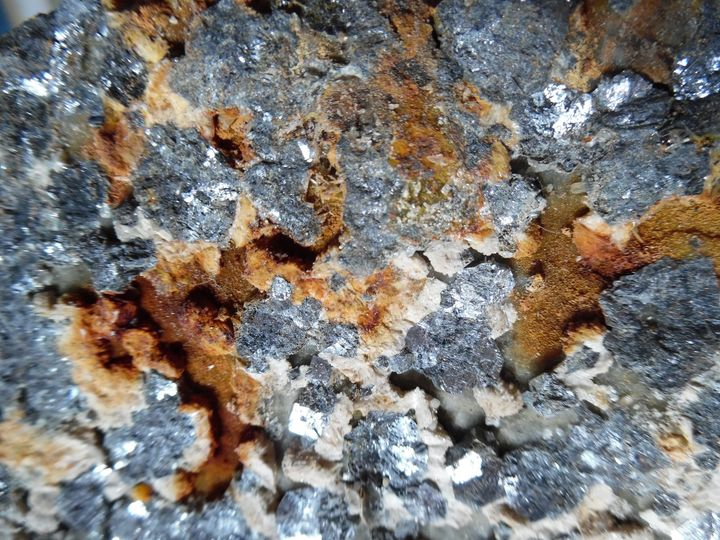
Close-up view. Metallic galena and some whitish/creamy cerussite are covered by brownish iron oxides.

The encountered lodes in the quarry belong to the classical sphalerite-pyrite-galena-chalcopyrite ore mineral association. As in the nearby Cantonnier Lode the mineralisation formed hydrothermally.

== History ==
Quarrying started in the Tabataud quarry in the 1890s. The encountered ores were gathered, but the focus of the mining activities was the granodiorite itself. In the beginning the granodiorite was a highly esteemed building and cobble stone, but was milled later on mainly to gravel (for roadworks etc.). In 2003 the mining came to a final halt; since then the quarry has been used as a storage area for the countless trees uprooted by cyclone Lothar in 1999. It is flooded by now.

== Literature ==
- Duthou, J.-L. et al. (1974). Les gisements plombo-zincifères du seuil du Poitou et de sa bordure Limousine. Bulletin du BRGM, section II, n° 1, p. 453 -474.
- Floc'h, J.-P. et al. Feuille Nontron. Carte géologique de la France à 1/50 000. BRGM, Orléans.
- Guillemot, J., Lebocey, J. & Legrand, N. (2008). Minéralogie de la carrière Tabataud, Nontron, Dordogne. Le Règne Minéral, vol. 84, p. 27 – 33.
