= Piégut-Pluviers Granodiorite =

The Piégut-Pluviers Granodiorite is situated at the northwestern edge of the Variscan Massif Central in France. Its cooling age has been determined as 325 ± 14 million years BP (Upper Mississippian, Serpukhovian).

== Geographical situation ==
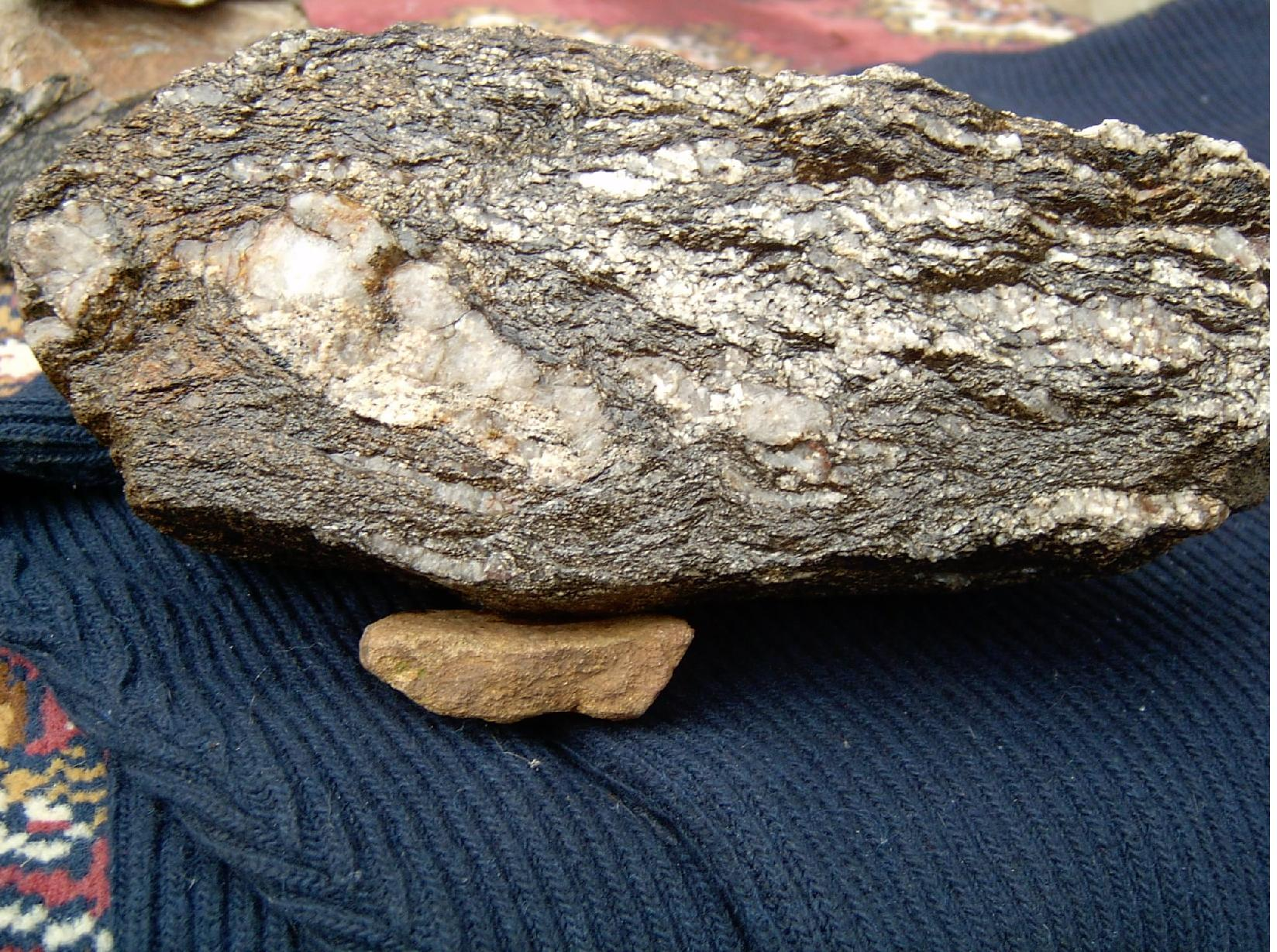
Plagioclase-bearing paragneiss south of Nontron with big porphyroblasts – country rocks of the granodiorite

The Granodiorite was named after Piégut-Pluviers, a small town in the Arrondissement of Nontron in the northern Dordogne. Its outline is in the shape of an inverted comma pointing north with a nearly squarish main southern part turned into the NE-SW direction. The main body measures 15.5 kilometers in the NE-SW direction and 15 kilometers in the NW-SE direction and terminates in a tapering triangular section. This section continues farther north in an almost ten kilometer long appendix that is separated from the main body only by a very thin layer of migmatitic gneiss. The granodiorite takes up about 250 square kilometers in surface area. Its lowest point has an elevation of 135 meters above sea level along the western edge; the highest point in the northeast rises to about 375 meters above sea level. Geomorphologically the granodiorite forms a tabular slab, that is gently inclined to the southwest without any major topographic differences.

== Geological overview ==
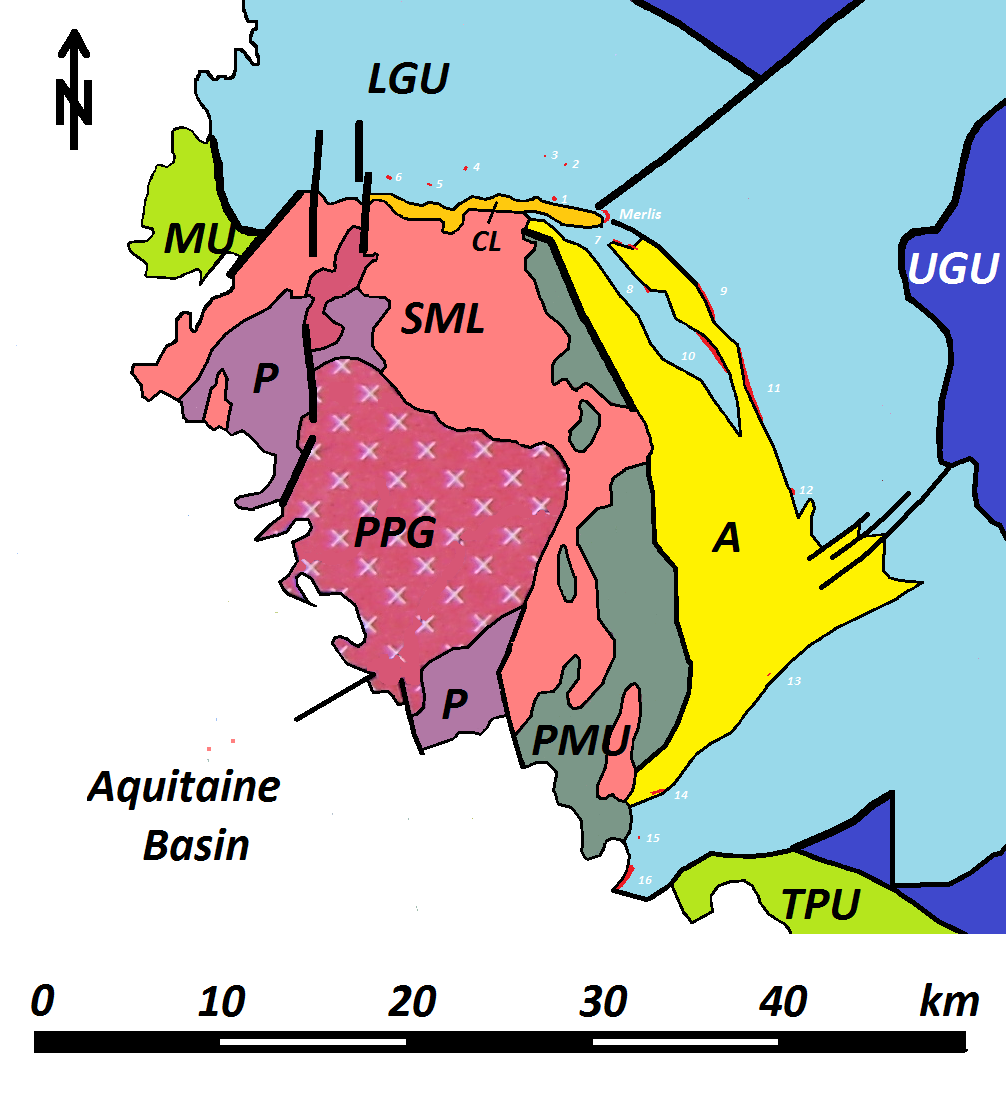
Geological map of the Saint-Mathieu Dome

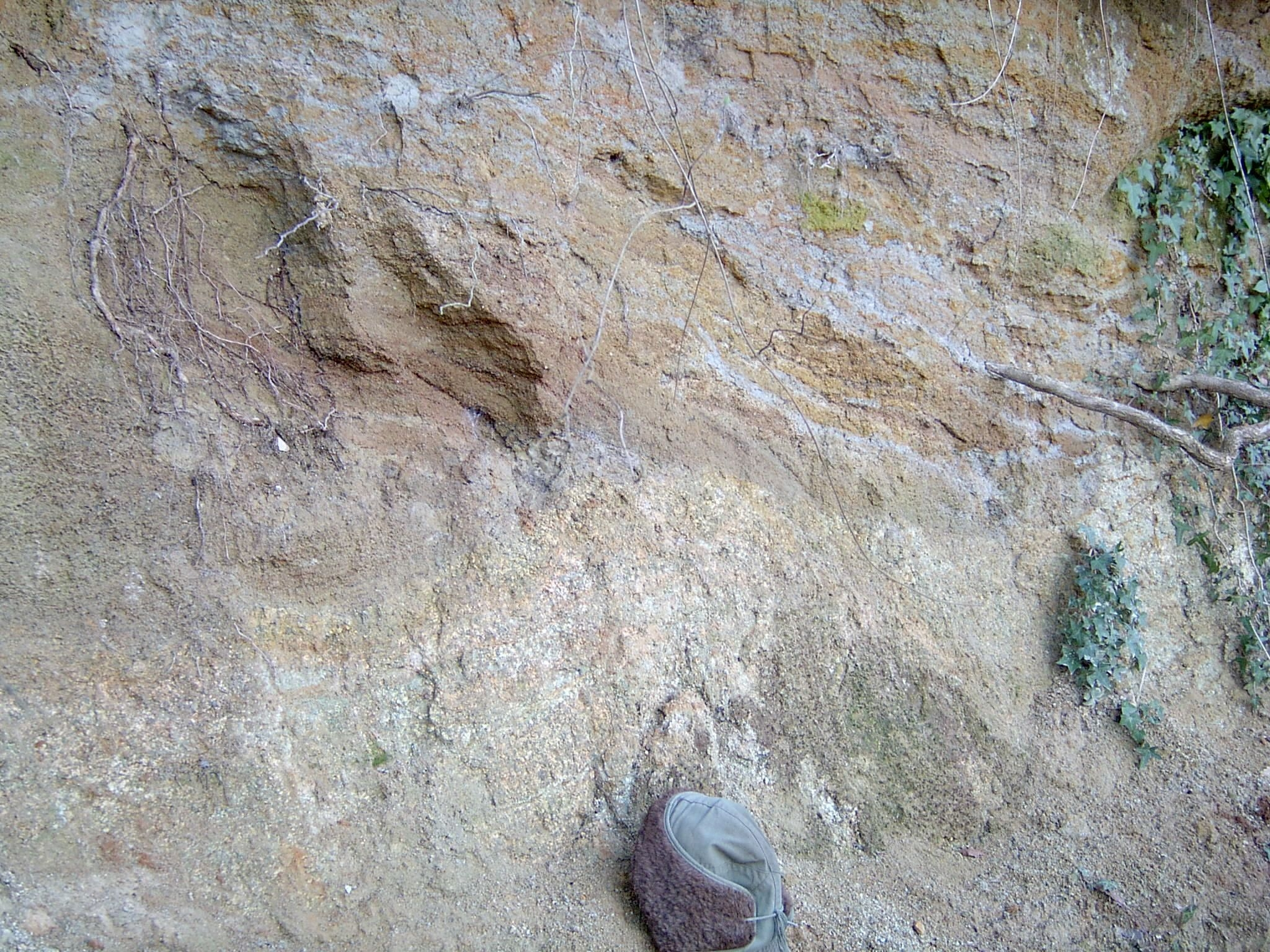
Transgression of liassic arkose onto the eroded Piégut-Pluviers Granodiorite near Nontron

The Piégut-Pluviers Granodiorite is surrounded in the north, northeast and east by the Saint-Mathieu Leucogranite and its equivalents (SML on the geological map), which has a slightly younger age of 315 ± 17 million years BP (Pennsylvanian, Bashkirian). In the northwest and southeast it is bordered by various paragneisses (unit P). Along the southwestern and western border the granodiorite is transgressed by liassic arkoses belonging to the sedimentary infill of the Aquitaine Basin. Together with the leucogranite the granodiorite forms a domal swell in the basement − the Saint-Mathieu Dome. The contact relationships with the paragneisses are not always clear-cut, sometimes there is a diffuse border region of several hundred meters where granodiorite and paragneiss interfinger. This indicates that the paragneiss is the host rock of the granodiorite and casts doubts on a truly intrusive origin.

The western Massif Central is a nappe-stack of several basement slivers in the following spatial arrangement (from top to bottom):

- Upper Gneiss Unit (UGU)
- Lower Gneiss Unit (LGU)
- Parautochthonous Micaschist Unit (unit bo) containing the Saint-Mathieu Leucogranite (PMU)
- Piégut-Pluviers Granodiorite
- paragneisses (P)

This arrangement is only spatial and does not reflect temporal relationships. Major thrust contacts are situated between the Parautochthonous Micaschist Unit and the Lower Gneiss Unit and in between the two gneiss units.

== Age ==
Field observations don't allow a decision on the relative ages of the two granitoids. Radiometric ages seem to indicate an older age for the granodiorite which has so far yielded 325 ± 14 million years BP and 314 ± 14 million years BP, whereas the leucogranite was dated at 315 ± 17 million years BP and at 304 ± 17 million years BP. Yet there is considerable overlap in these Rb-Sr-data and also a high standard deviation, so these values should be used with caution.

== Petrological facies ==
The Piégut-Pluviers Granodiorite is not homogenous, but consists of several petrological facies:

- coarse-grained (common) facies
- coarse-grained porphyric facies
- fine-grained facies
- fine-grained hornblende-bearing facies

=== Coarse-grained facies ===
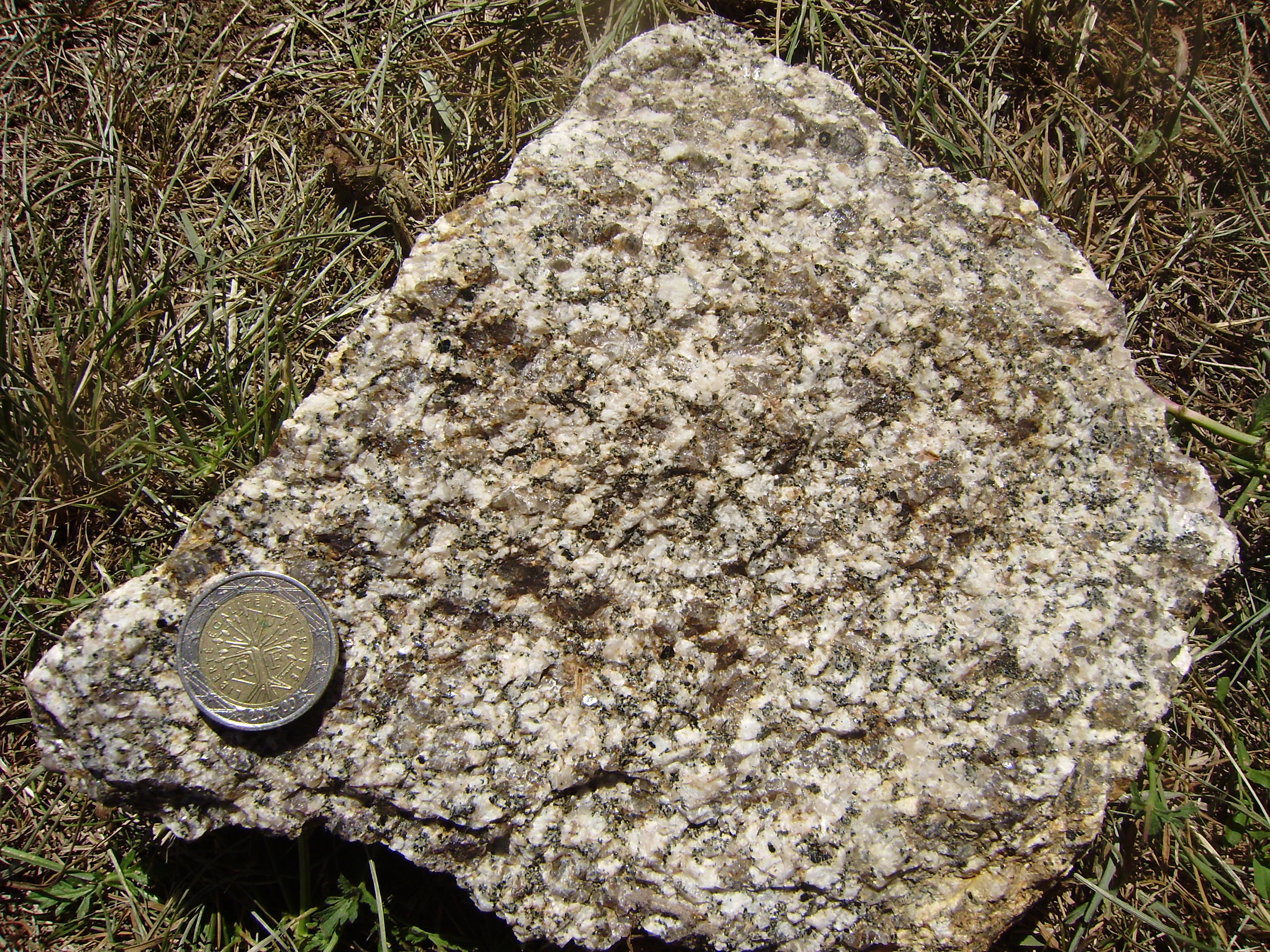
Common coarse-grained facies of the Piégut-Pluviers Granodiorite

The coarse-grained or common facies takes up the largest surface area. Grain sizes vary in general between 2 and 6 millimeter with roughly isometric grains. The fresh rock has a grey colour; weathered outcrops can take on a brownish-reddish stain. It comprises the following minerals:

- quartz - rounded, globular grains of 1 to 3 millimeter in diameter, can form agglomerations with 1 to 3 centimeters in diameter − 26 volume percent
- plagioclase − often displays normal zoning, with calcic cores An _{33-35} (andesine) and more sodic rims An_{25} oligoclase); some euhedral grains reach 10 millimeters and more − 42 volume percent
- orthoclase − perthitic, Carlsbad twinning, corroded by quartz, some euhedral crystals can reach more than 10 millimeters in grain size − 18 volume percent
- biotite − millimeter grain size, brass coloured, with zircon inclusions and often chloritized − 10 volume percent

Accessories are zoned allanite, apatite, epidote, occasionally green hornblende, zircon and zoisite. An opaque mineral is pyrite.

The coarse-grained facies sometimes contains dark, fine-grained rounded to subrounded inclusions that cover the centimeter to decimeter size range. The long axes of the feldspar grains show a preferred orientation in some places.

This facies is normative in quartz (oversaturated in SiO_{2}) and in corundum (peraluminous). It is also subalkaline. In the alphabet-soup classification it represents an I-type granitoid of calcalkaline characteristics belonging to the K-series. Compared with average granodiorites, this rock type has a higher SiO_{2} value and approaches the composition of monzonitic granites.

=== Coarse-grained porphyric facies ===
This facies is very similar to the common facies mineralogically and chemically, the difference being an increase in grain-size of the feldspars (can reach 1 to 4 centimeter; in some places even 6 centimeter). The groundmass minerals usually have a grain size of 5 millimeter, which is slightly higher than in the common facies. The transition from the common to the porphyric facies is gradual. Major outcrops are centered on Lacaujamet near Piégut (old abandoned quarry for lintels and facing stones) and on Puybégout near Augignac.

=== Fine-grained facies ===
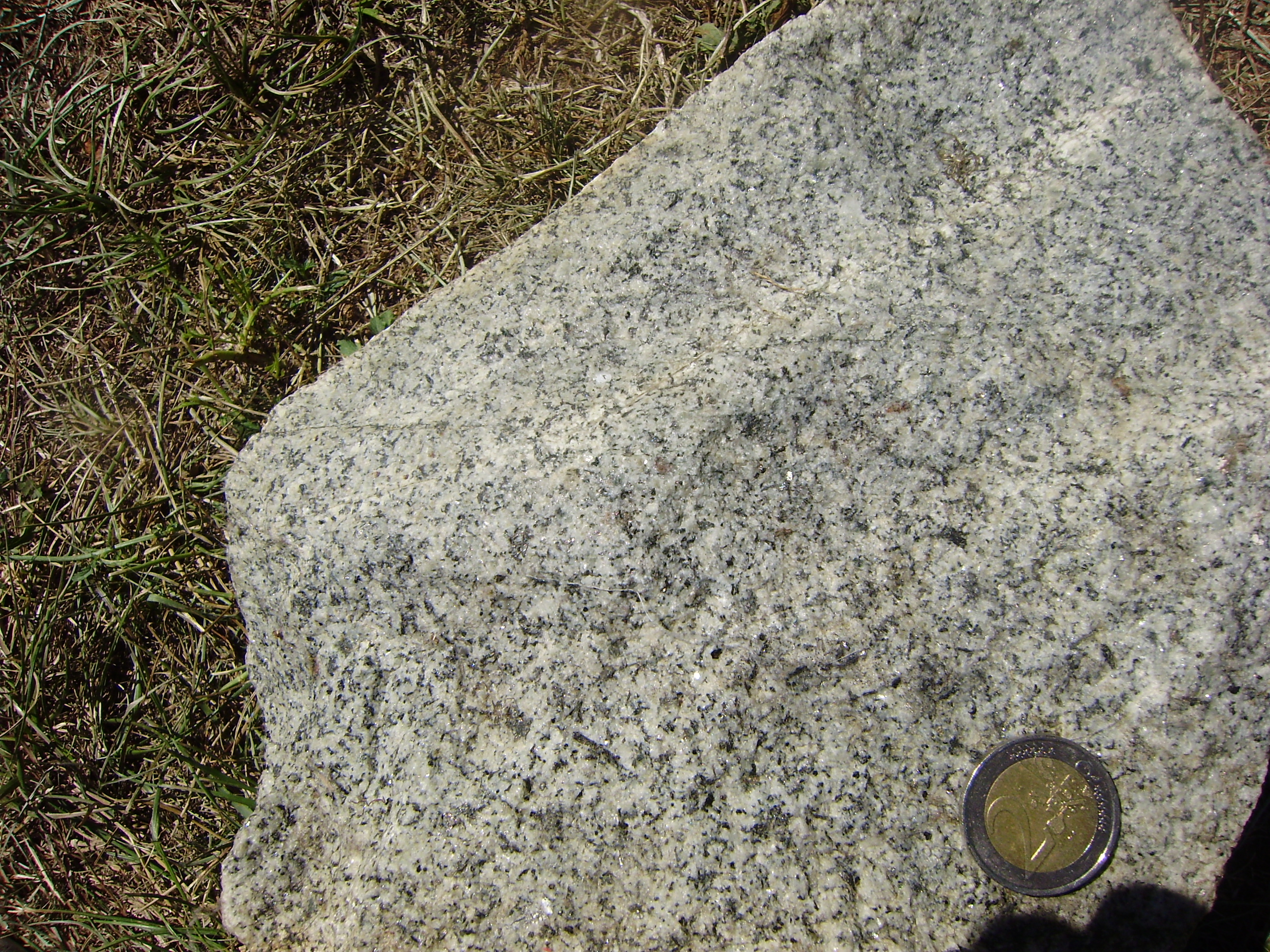
Fine-grained facies of the Piégut-Pluviers Granodiorite

The fine-grained facies can be found mainly along the Bandiat river southeast of Nontron at the southern edge of the Piégut-Pluviers Granodiorite. This facies gradually develops from the common facies by a decrease in grain size. Mineralogically and chemically its composition is also very similar, the only difference being an increase in hornblende and a slight decrease in alkali feldspar. The fine-grained facies also occurs in a narrow strip along the northeastern and the northwestern margin of the granodiorite and in isolated patches in the interior, which might represent a roof facies of the granodiorite.

=== Fine-grained hornblende-bearing facies ===
These fine- to medium-grained rocks have a rather dark appearance, they are quite rich in green hornblende but nearly devoid in alkali feldspar (less than 10 volume percent). Their SiO_{2}-contents are fairly low, so they compositionally approach dioritic rocks. In the past this facies has been extensively quarried (Tabataud Quarry south of Nontron). Associated with this facies are several NW-SE striking mineralised veins that have been mined for lead, silver and zinc. Mining activity stopped in 1939. The Cantonnier Lode is famous for very rare mineralizations. Besides baryte, calcite, chalcedony, dolomite, galena, marcasite, pyrite and sphalerite occur very rare minerals like anglesite, cerussite, crocoite, dundasite, embreyite, hisingerite, leadhillite, mimetite, ozokerite (pseudomineral), pyromorphite, native silver, vauquelinite and wulfenite.

The following chemical compositions are averages (14 analyses for the common facies, 2 analyses for the porphyric facies, 3 analyses for the fine-grained facies and 3 analyses for the fine-grained hornblende-bearing facies):

Oxide Weight %	Common facies	Porphyric facies	Fine-grained facies	Fine-grained Hbl facies	CIPW-Norm Percent	Common facies	Porphyric facies	Fine-grained facies	Fine-grained Hbl facies
SiO_{2}	70,49	69,98	71,83	64,43	Q	28,78	25,84	31,04	21,55
TiO_{2}	0,44	0,42	0,30	0,61	Or	22,45	24,34	24,58	16,54
Al_{2}O_{3}	14,69	15,42	14,95	15,90	Ab	29,77	31,55	29,94	27,91
Fe_{2}O_{3}	0,93	0,51	0,43	0,82	An	9,69	9,31	5,44	17,08
FeO	1,38	1,65	1,48	3,42	C	1,23	1,41	2,62	1,17
MnO	0,06	0,04	0,04	0,08	Hy	4,56	4,91	3,66	10,33
MgO	1,18	1,21	0,74	2,49	Mt	1,68	0,78	0,69	1,54
CaO	2,02	1,89	1,32	3,60	Il	0,83	0,82	0,56	1,15
Na_{2}O	3,52	3,73	3,54	3,30	Ap	0,11	0,02	0,39	0,27
K_{2}O	3,80	4,12	4,16	2,80					
P_{2}O_{5}	0,05	0,01	0,17	0,12					
H_{2}O^{−}	0,08	0,12		0,09					
H_{2}O^{+}	0,90	0,86	0,87	1,78					
Mg#	0,59	0,56	0,47	0,55					
A'/F	0,34	0,31	0,62	0,12					
Al/K+Na+Ca	1,08	1,10	1,17	1,05					

The magnesium numbers Mg # spread between 0,55 and 0,59 and are somewhat elevated compared with an average granodiorite. The anomalous fine-grained border facies shows an exceptionally low value of 0,47. The aluminosity (A'/F) values take up quite a large range with a tendency to peraluminous compositions. According to the alphabet-soup classification, the Piégut-Pluviers Granodiorite is a border case of an I-type granitoid. Again, the fine-grained border facies tends towards an S-type, thus documenting a contamination by the metasedimentary paragneisses.

== Microgranite ==
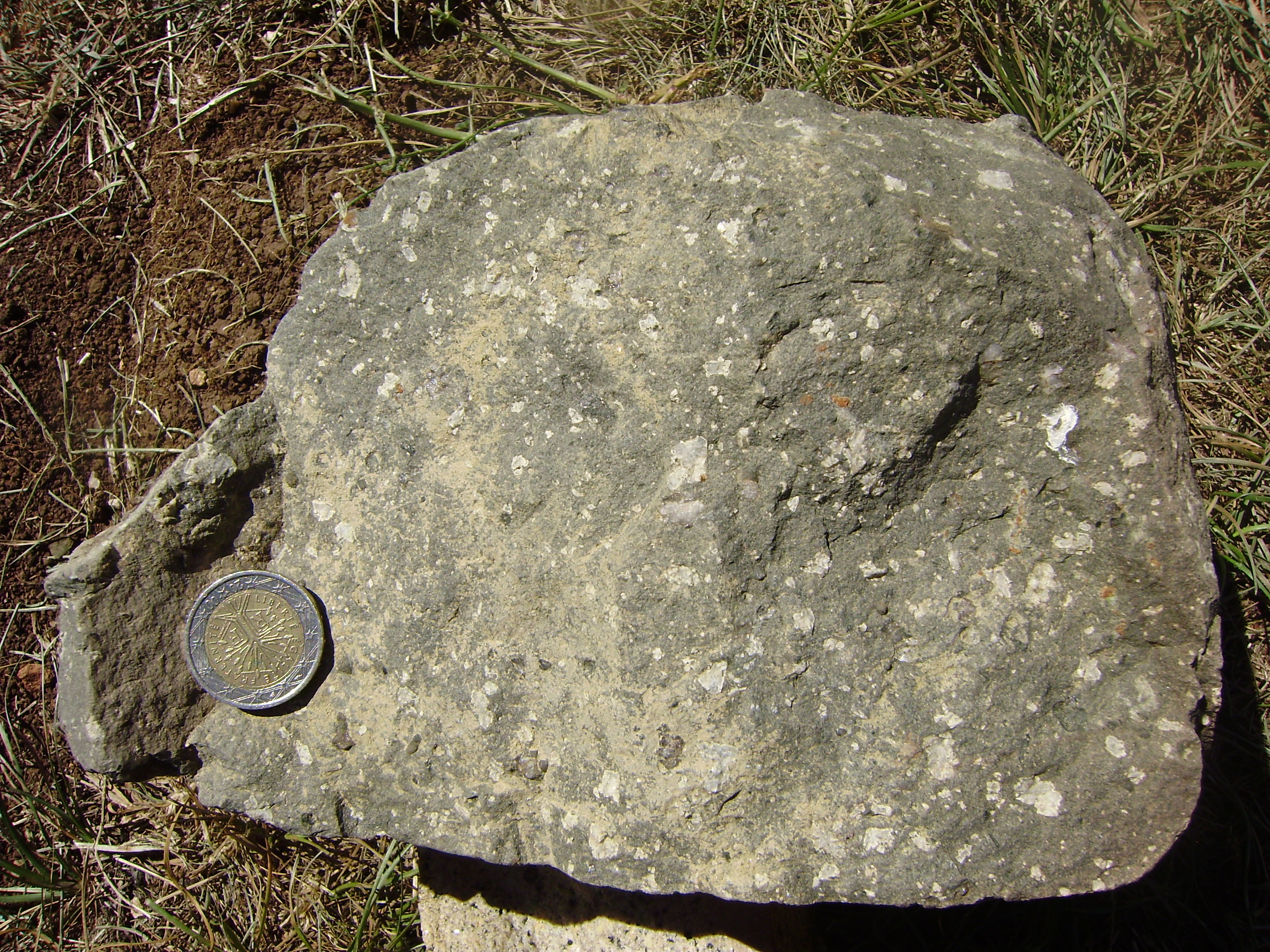
Light grey porphyric microgranite of the northern apophysis

The microgranite crops out in an apophysis north of the main granodiorite. It is separated from the main massif along the Trieux river only by a very thin migmatitic gneiss layer. Genetically it is probably related to the main granodiorite. The microgranite is porphyritic with a very fine groundmass. It develops two different facies, a light grey facies in its interior and a dark facies along the border. Mineralogically and chemically the microgranite very much resembles the fine-grained hornblende-bearing facies of the main massif. The phenocrysts can reach 12 millimeter in size and consist of quartz, plagioclase and biotite. Alkali feldspar is found only in the groundmass, sometimes associated with myrmekite. Besides the common accessories chlorite, epidote and zircon occurs titanite. The dark facies is rich in green hornblende.

Rocks compositionally very similar (but texturally different) to the light grey facies can also be found in isolated kilometer-sized enclaves within the main granodiorite (near Saint-Barthélemy-de-Bussière and south of Marval. They show intrusive contact relationships with the main body.

== Dikes ==
=== Aplites ===
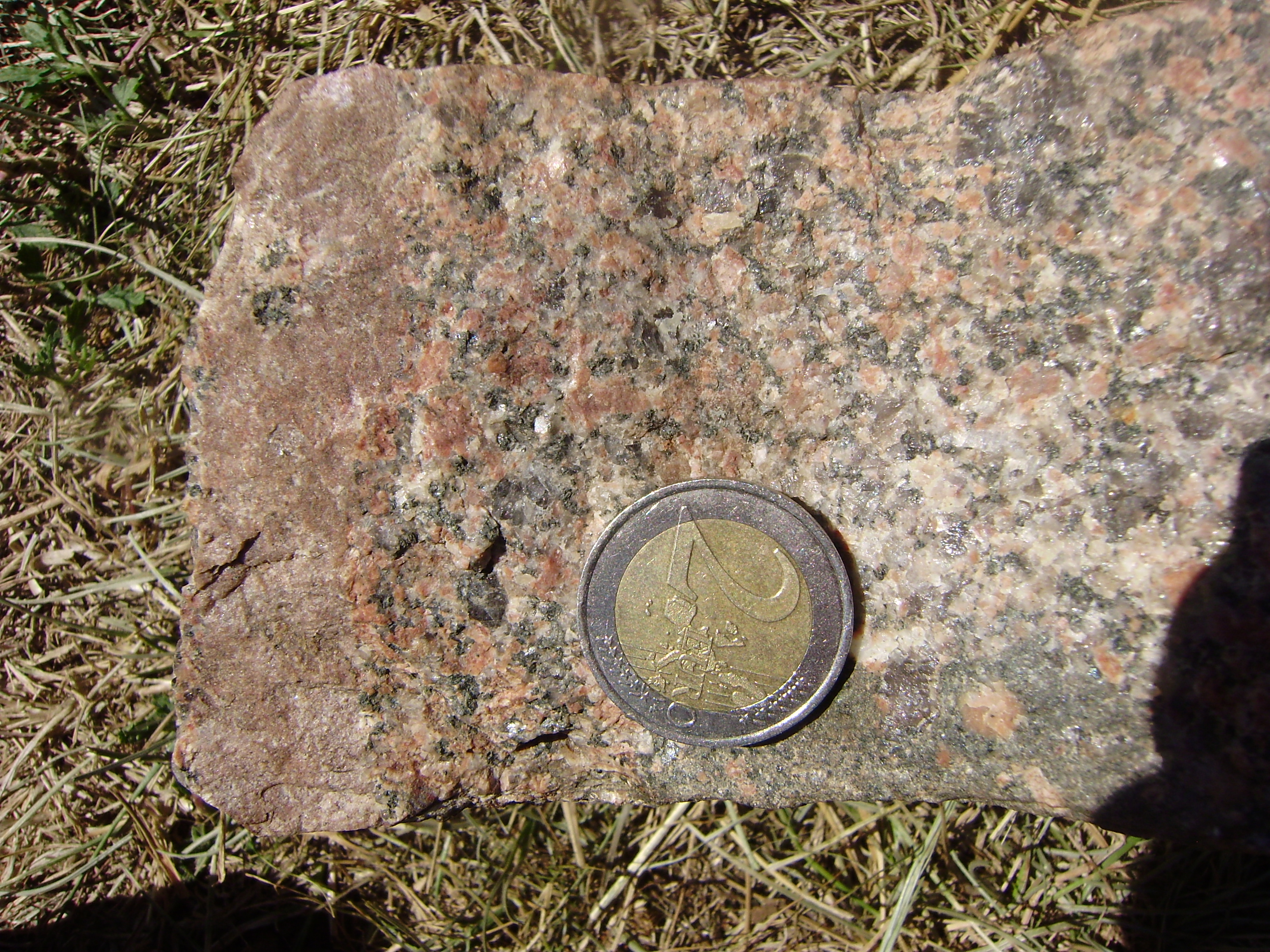
Red facies in the common granodiorite near Abjat-sur-Bandiat, at the left edge a pink aplite dike

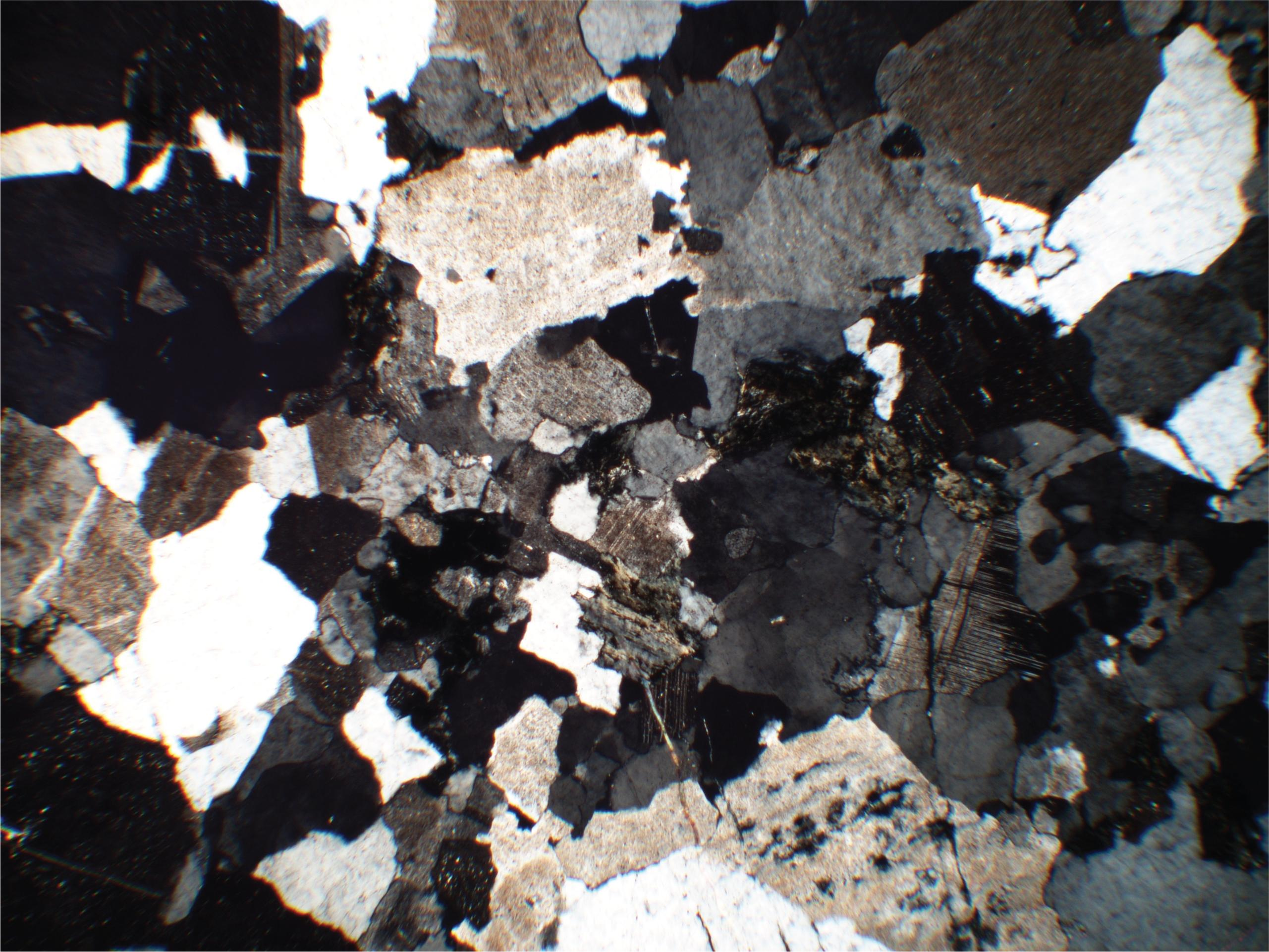
Thin section of pink aplite dike in red facies granodiorite, magnification 1:50. The plagioclase is stained red by hematite, the biotite is strongly chloritized.

The Piégut-Pluviers-Granodiorite is crosscut by many grey, in some places pink microgranitic aplite dikes. These usually upright dikes can occasionally attain one kilometer in length, their maximum thickness varying between one and ten meters. They are mainly oriented North-South and in many places follow a cross pattern formed by the N 020 and the N160 directions. Mineralogically the fine-grained phenocrysts consist of quartz, feldspars and biotite. The plagioclase phenocrysts occasionally reach a grain-size of 10 millimeters. The alkali feldspar is confined to the groundmass.

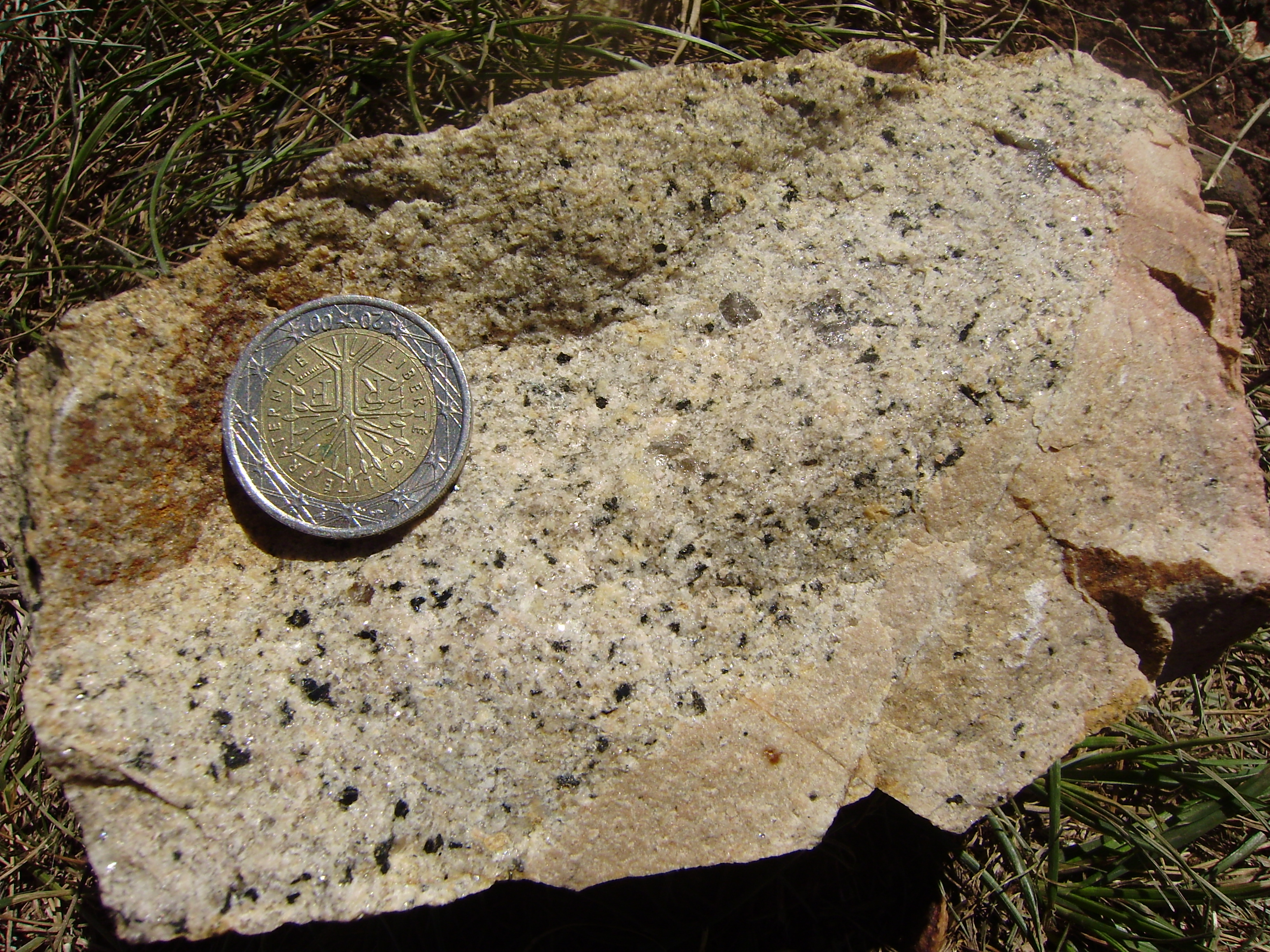
Light intrusive microgranite in the main massif with a pink aplite dike on the lower right

Associated with the pink aplite dikes is a coarser-grained red facies occurring in two larger outcrops near Ballerand and near Fargeas (commune of Abjat-sur-Bandiat). This facies contains also micropegmatites and pegmatitic geodes. In some places it also carries enclaves of quartz diorite and monzogabbro.

The reddish colours of the aplites and the red facies rocks is due to hematite invading the plagioclase and staining it. These rocks therefore underwent Fe-metasomatism (see thin section at left). Most of the biotite has been altered to chlorite (chloritization) indicating retrograde metamorphism under greenschist facies conditions.

=== Pegmatites ===
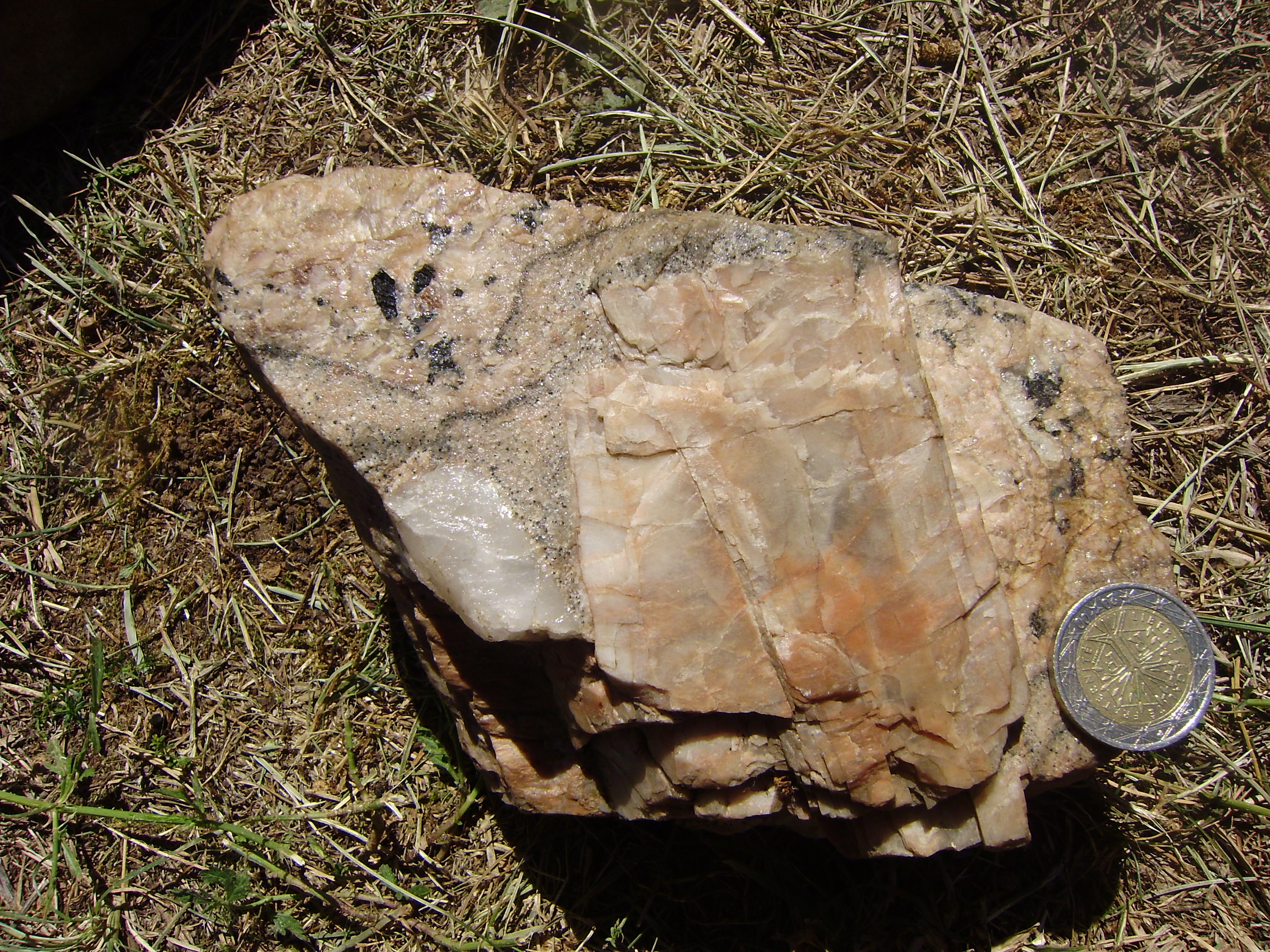
Pegmatite with large quartz, huge perthitic alkali feldspar and mafic reaction seam

Pegmatites do occur as well, mainly as dikes; in some places as amygdules with beautiful smoky quartz (rare).

=== Lamprophyre ===
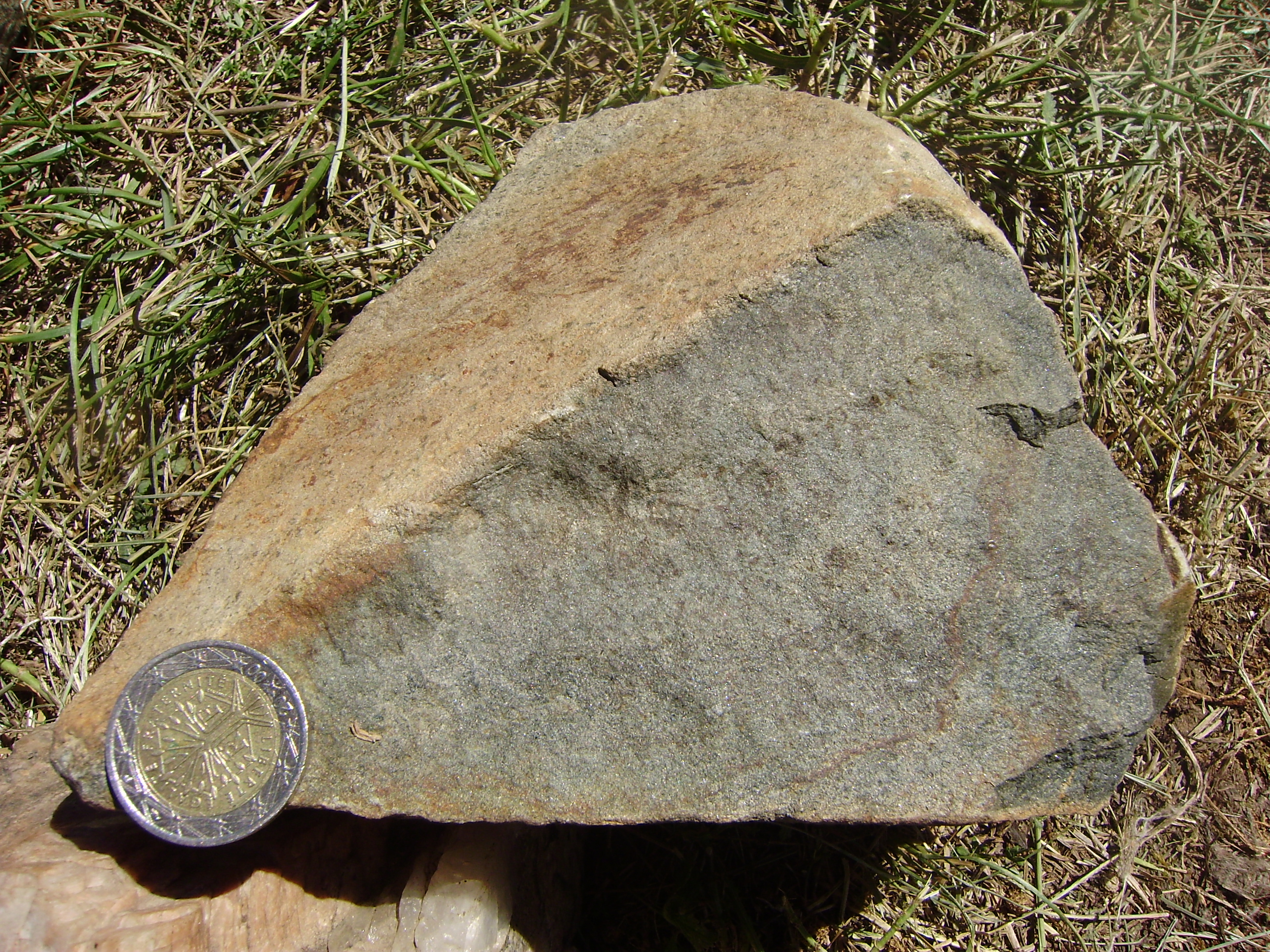
Lamprophyre from the Piégut-Pluviers Granodiorite

Lamprophyre dikes are fairly common in the metamorphic country rocks of the granodiorite, but extremely rare in the massif itself. Unweathered lamprophyres have a dark green to green colour; they are very dense fine-grained rocks that weather in creamy colours. Amongst all the different facies they have the lowest SiO_{2}-content and approach dioritic compositions (quartz-bearing microdiorites with tonalitic affinities).

Oxide Weight %	Microgranite	Aplite	Lamprophyre	CIPW-Norm Percent	Microgranite	Aplite	Lamprophyre
SiO_{2}	63,70	72,00	60,00	Q	18,30	32,92	14,45
TiO_{2}	0,56	0,28	0,79	Or	15,98	27,71	13,30
Al_{2}O_{3}	15,74	14,20	15,10	Ab	28,83	27,06	21,51
Fe_{2}O_{3}	1,04	0,45	0,90	An	20,25	4,39	28,84
FeO	3,60	1,30	4,63	Di	0,14		0,45
MnO	0,08	0,04	0,10	Hy	13,29	3,60	16,95
MgO	3,55	0,88	5,04	Mt	1,87	0,84	2,52
CaO	4,21	0,90	4,25	Il	1,07	0,55	1,56
Na_{2}O	3,36	3,20	3,44	Ap	0,26	0,28	0,42
K_{2}O	2,67	4,60	2,17	C		2,65	
P_{2}O_{5}	0,12	0,12	0,17				
H_{2}O^{−}	0,05	0,08	0,16				
H_{2}O^{+}	0,87	1,10	1,85				
Mg#	0,63	0,54	0,65				
A'/F	0,02	0,63	-0,01				
Al/K+Na+Ca	0,98	1,19	0,96				

The aplites are clearly peraluminous and belong to the S-type and are very similar to the fine-grained border facies. Microgranites and lamprophyres show similarities and belong to the I-type; they are hypaluminous to normal aluminous rocks and most likely have originated from an independent magma pulse or batch.

== Structures ==
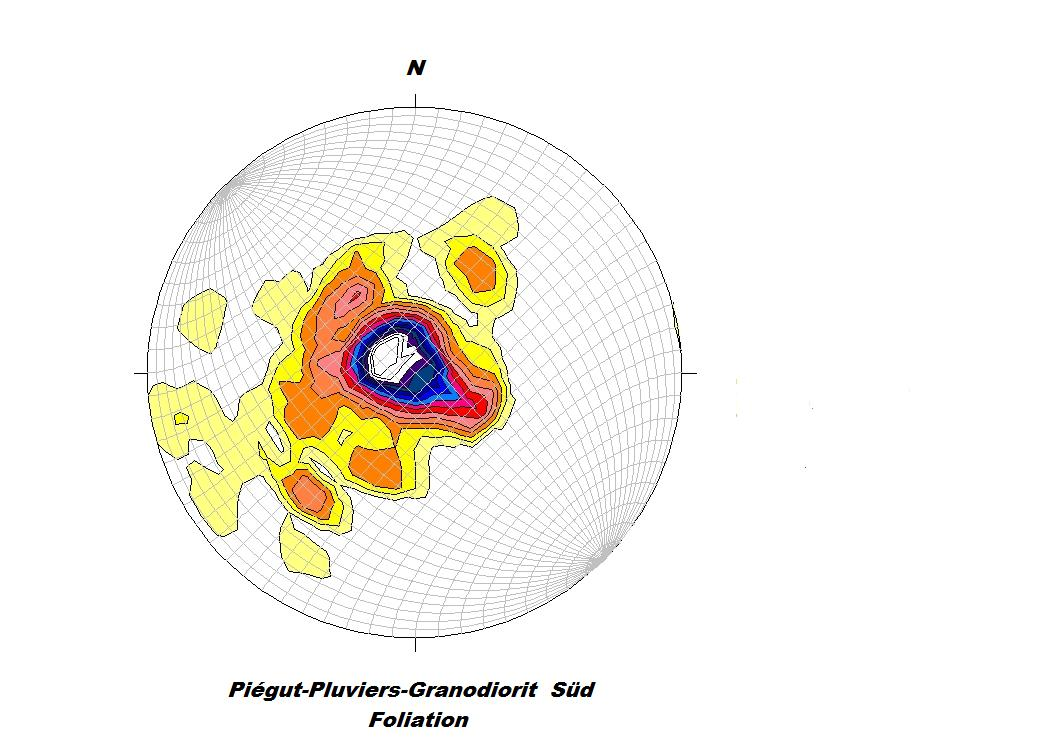
Foliation in the southern part of the granodiorite. Data plotted in a stereo net.

Despite a rather homogenous appearance the Piégut-Pluviers Granodiorite carries a foliation of tectonic origin, that is clearly evident in more weathered superficial outcrops. This indicates that the granodiorite was continuing to be deformed during the Variscan orogeny even in the subsolidus stage together with the country rocks. The stereo net on the right shows the spatial organisation of the granodiorite. One can discern a crossed pattern formed by the NW-SE and the NE-SW direction, very typical for this part of the Massif Central. This pattern can be interpreted as follows:

- a relatively flat, nearly symmetrical wave pattern in the NW-SE direction whose angles of incidence do not surpass 30° and whose wavelength varies from tens to hundreds of meters. Shear bands of the C'-type can be discerned.
- an asymmetric wave structure in the NE-SW direction with rather steep NE-facing limbs. Shear bands are of the C-type.

This implies, that the granodiorite was situated in regional shear zone or Riedel zone, in which the main material transport was directed to the Southeast (under extensional flow conditions) complicated by a simultaneous material transport under compression to the Southwest.

With the gradual cooling of the Variscan orogen the ductile movements came to an end. Accumulated strains in the granodiorite were now released in a brittle manner by faults, fractures and joints. Into these late orogenic zones of material weakness aplites, pegmatites and lamprophyres intruded. At the end of the Pennsylvanian hot hydrothermal solutions deposited lead, zinc and silver in veins, and in a second pulse a suite of rare arsenic-molybdenum mineralization was created.

== Final conclusion ==
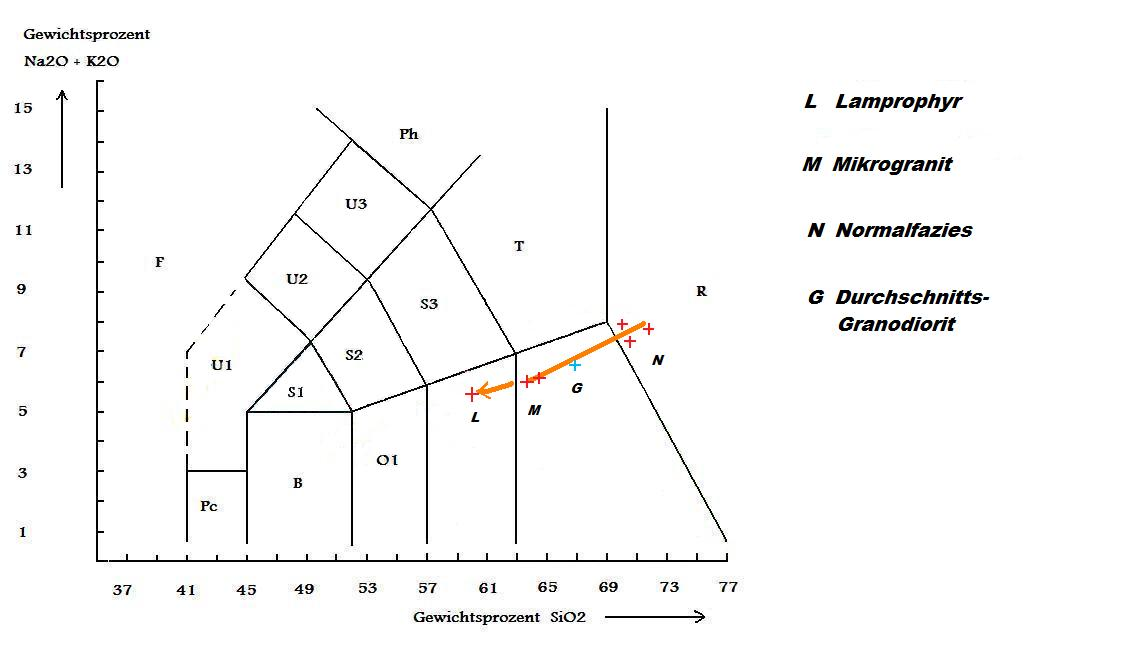
The different facies of the granodiorite in the TAS diagram. The blue cross indicates the composition of an average granodiorite

Modally the rocks of the massif plot as granodiorite in the QAPF diagram yet are in close vicinity of the granite field. Chemically they are granites; to be more precise they are adamellites. Likewise in the TAS diagram they plot as rhyolites.

At a first glance the rocks of the massif appear rather homogeneous, but closer inspection reveals several different petrologic facies. Chemical analyses indicate the existence of SiO_{2}-poorer rock types, i.e., the fine-grained hornblende-bearing border facies, the microgranites of the northern apophysis, the lamprophyres and the dark inclusions. The clear-cut distinction of the microgranites and the lamprophyres from the other facies argues for the existence or the hybridisation of two separate magmas.

Besides purely magmatic structures like schlieren and the alignment of feldspars due to viscous flow one can discern several tectonic structures in the granodiorite:

- foliation
- shear zones with C/S fabric and sbc fabric (shear band cleavage)
- mylonitic granitoids along the southern edge of the massif

The occasional appearance of myrmekite (mainly in the microgranites) and the hematitization of the plagioclase in the aplites and in the red facies rocks points to metasomatic processes.

The chloritization of the biotite is a clear sign for retrograde metamorphic overprinting under greenschist facies conditions. This fate the Piégut-Pluviers granodiorite shares with many other crystalline basement rocks in the Massif Central.

The massif therefore bears witness of multiple processes affecting it underlining the complexity in the formation of granitoids. Already during its initial magmatic stage the solidifying crystal mush continued being deformed in a ductile manner. Even after solidification deformations didn't stop but kept on transforming the rocks in a brittle fashion and allowing the still very hot metasomatic fluids to perform their alterations on the massif.

== Economic use ==
In the past the Piégut-Pluviers Granodiorite was in high demand economically. Due to its mineralization at the boundary fault the metals lead, zinc and silver were mined in the Cantonnier Lode and its prolongations towards Saint-Pardoux-la-Rivière. The granodiorite was also used as a building stone or was broken up for road gravel and building foundations. Today one last quarry is operational near Abjat-sur-Bandiat, where the rare decorative red facies is mined and mainly used as road surfacing. All other quarries, like the Tabataud Quarry in Nontron, the Piégut quarry or the Lacaujamet quarry — the latter produced massive building stones like lintels etc. — have been closed by now. Scattered through the countryside one can see local road side excavations that were mainly used for roadworks.

== Repository for nuclear waste ==
In the search for a suitable site as a repository for nuclear waste from the French nuclear power stations at the end of the 1990s ANDRA had chosen several granitoids to be investigated − amongst them the Piégut-Pluviers Granodiorite. This project found fierce opposition amongst the inhabitants of the Dordogne and after several demonstrations it was abandoned. After that research activities shifted to the granitoid of Civray-Charroux in the Vienne, which is covered by Jurassic sediments of the Seuil du Poitou. At the moment ANDRA seems to favour the Bure site in the Meuse in eastern France as the final repository − in Mesozoic clays 500 meter below the surface.

== Literature ==
- Carte géologique de la France au millionième (1996). 6ème édition. Éditions BRGM. Service Géologique National. ISBN 2-7159-2128-4
- Geological maps of the BRGM, scale 1/50000. Sheets Châlus, Nontron, La Rochefoucauld, Montbron and Thiviers.
- Passchier, C. W. und Trouw, R.A.J. (1998) Microtectonics. Springer Verlag. ISBN 3-540-58713-6
