= Saint-Mathieu Dome =

Geological feature in France

The Saint-Mathieu dome is a dome-like upwarp in the metamorphic basement of the northwestern French Massif Central. It exposes a very deep and normally hidden parautochthonous unit at the surface.

== Geography and geology ==
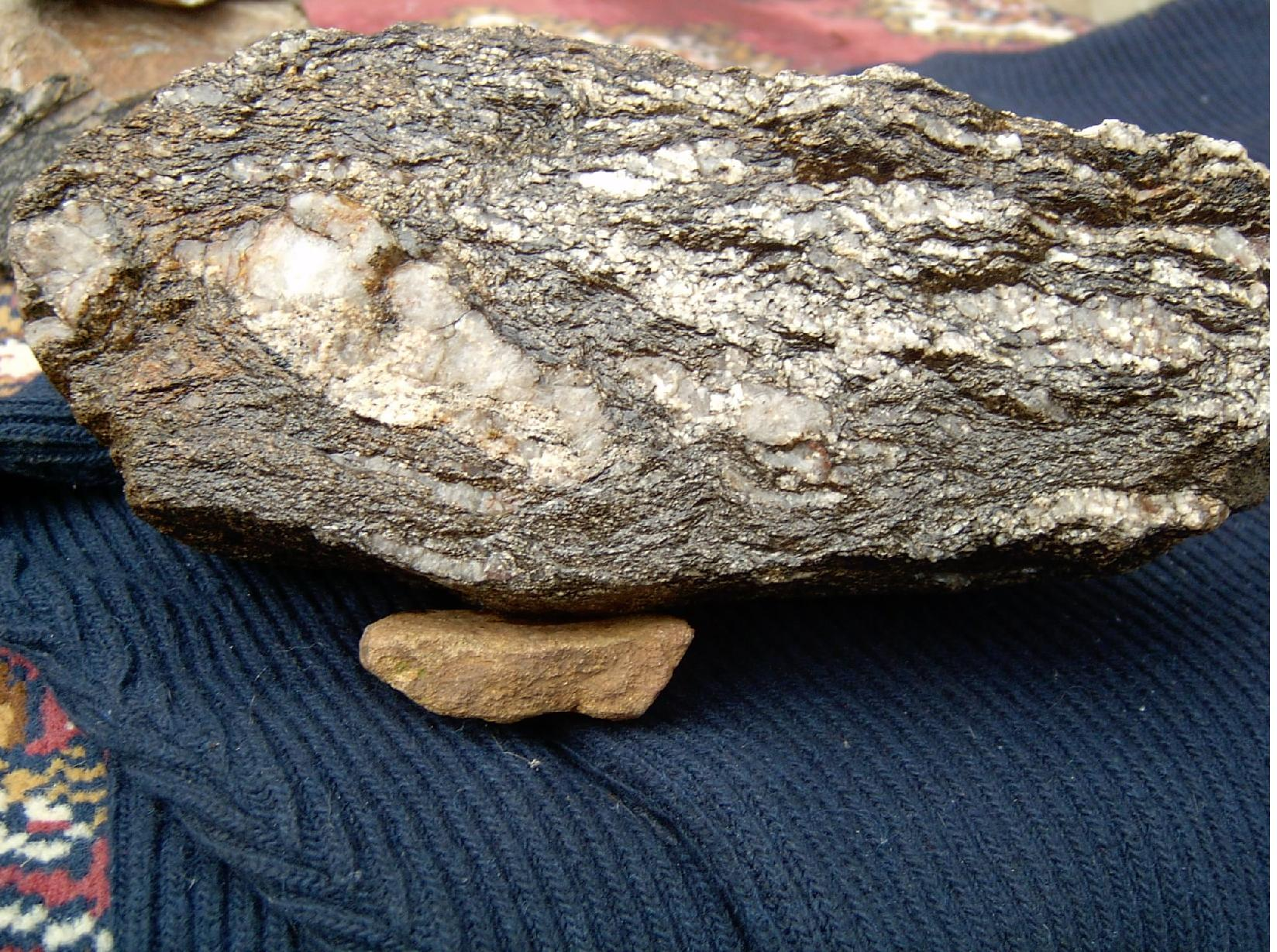
Plagioclase-bearing paragneiss from Nontron

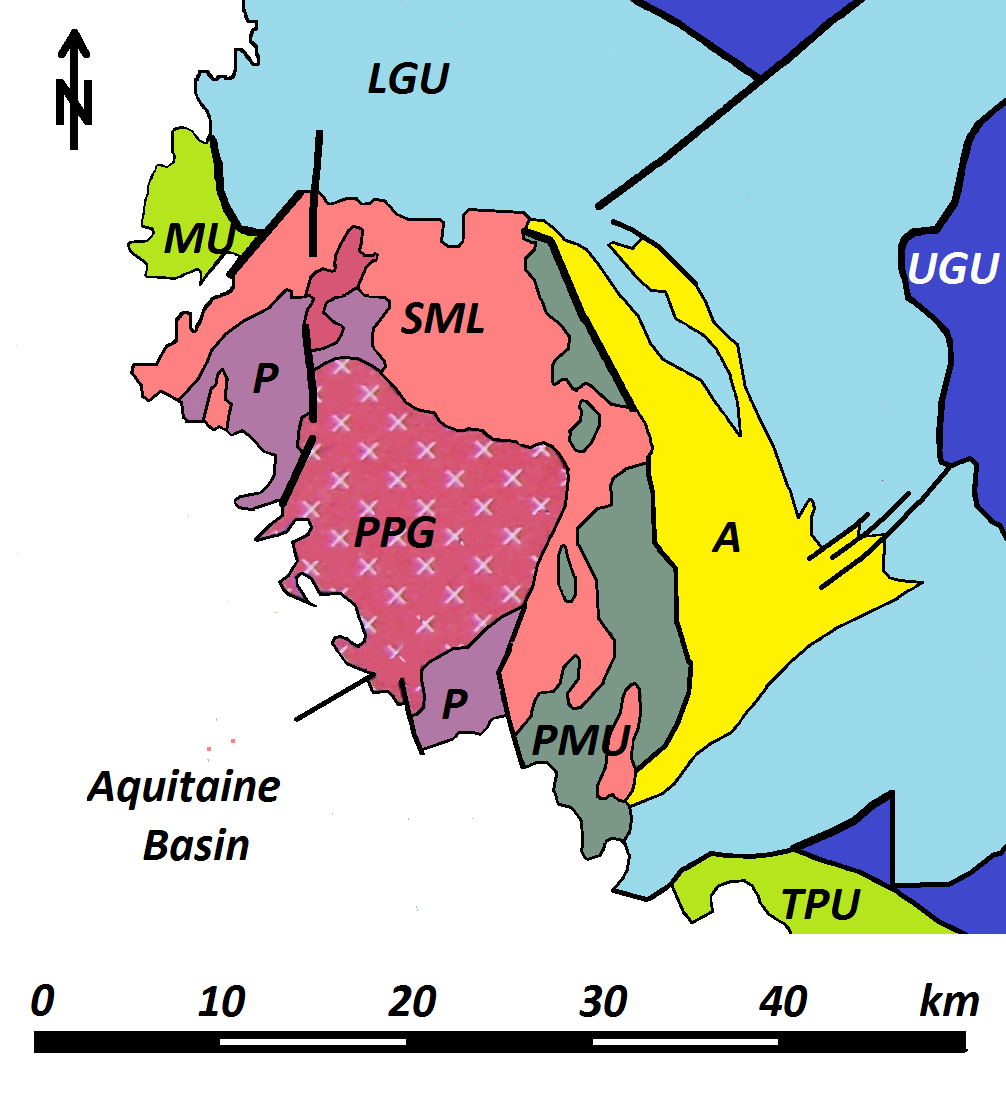
Geological map of the Saint-Mathieu dome

The Saint-Mathieu dome, named after the small town Saint-Mathieu in the Haute-Vienne department, is situated at the very northwestern edge of the Massif Central. To the southwest the dome structure is bordered by sediments of the Aquitaine Basin, the contact usually being marked by a border fault. On its eastern side the upwarp is overthrust by augengneisses (A) of the Lower Gneiss Unit (LGU), which between Saint-Jean-de-Côle in the South and the hamlet of Peyrassoulat (commune of Chéronnac) in the North override the Parautochthonous Micaschist Unit (PMU). The dome is bounded to the North by paragneisses of the Lower Gneiss Unit. The northwestern corner of the basement high is cut off by the Le Lindois Fault separating the dome's interior from the Mazerolles Unit in the Northwest and from Lias to the Southwest.

The dome measures about 35 kilometers in its maximal meridional extension and about 25 kilometers in an East-West direction.

Within the dome the following geological units can be discerned:

- Parautochthonous Micaschist Unit (PMU), bounded to the West by the intrusive Saint-Mathieu Leucogranite (SML) and to the North by the Chéronnac Leucogranite.
- Paragneisses (P), intruded by the Piégut-Pluviers Granodiorite (PPG).

On its western side the upwarp is traversed by a North-South-striking fault zone, which separates the Piégut-Pluviers granodiorite from the paragneisses. This fault zone starts at Lacrète (commune of Étouars) in the South and terminates just south of Massignac in the North.

== Formation ==
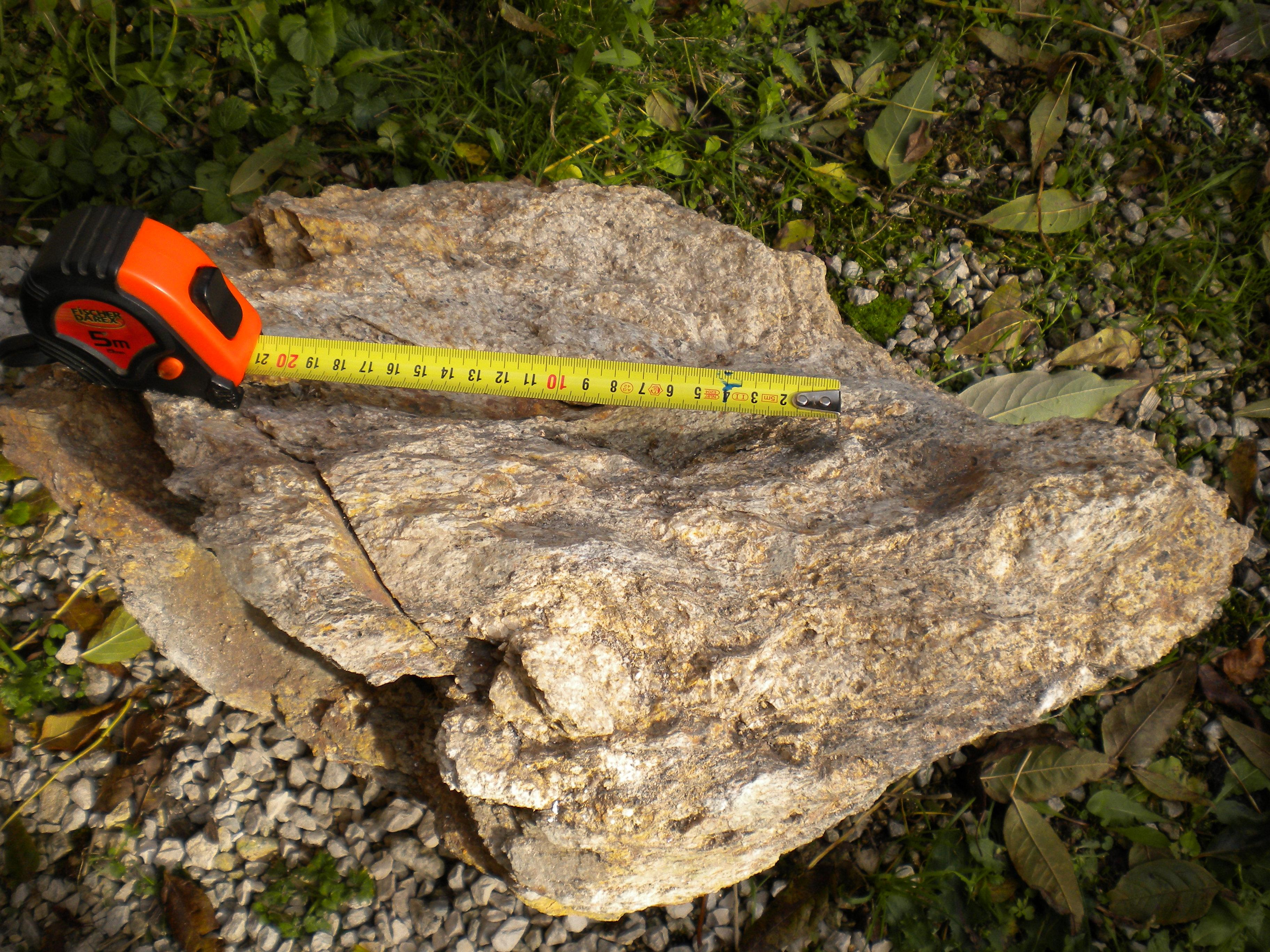
Anatectic Roussines granite, part of the Saint-Mathieu leucogranite

The interior of the dome structure is dominated by magmatic intrusive rocks, especially east of the North-South trending fault zone. These rocks occupy about 80% of the dome's surface area. It is therefore very likely that the basement upwarp was caused by a ballooning of the neovariscan intrusives. A direct tectonical cause of the structure caused by horsing thrust units during mediovariscan tectogenesis (continental collision 400 to 360 million years BP in the Limousin can be ruled out as the Saint-Mathieu leucogranite intruded well above the thrust plane and also sent many small apophyses into the augengneisses.

== Age ==
The neovariscan intrusives within the dome were emplaced during the Pennsylvanian, the Piégut-Pluviers granodiorite is dated for instance at 315 to 314 million years BP. The Saint-Mathieu leucogranite is younger, its coarse-grained facies was dated at 304 million years. This terminal Carboniferous age is most probably also the date for the final arching of the upwarp.

== Regional overview ==
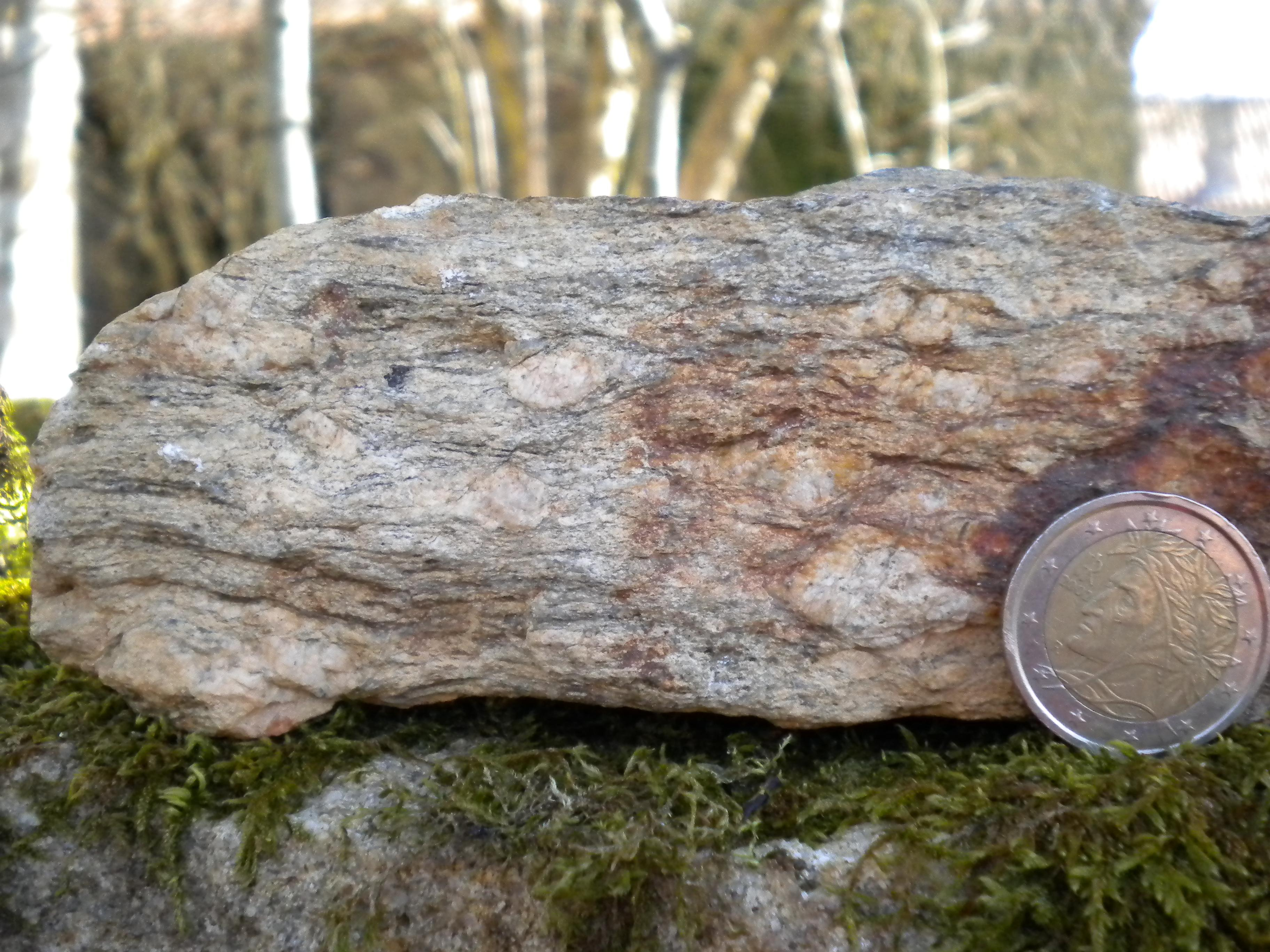
Augengneiss of the Lower Gneiss Unit near Mialet. These augengneisses overthrust the dome in the east.

The Saint-Mathieu dome is situated to the west of a large synform in the variscan nappe stack, the Saint-Germain-les-Belles Synform. South of Limoges this medium to high grade nappe stack consists of the Parautochthonous Micaschist Unit at the bottom, tectonically overlain by the Lower Gneiss Unit and the Upper Gneiss Unit (UGU) resting on top. The Upper Gneiss Unit is itself overthrust by the less metamorphic Thiviers-Payzac Unit (TPU) from the south. The Mazerolles Unit (MU), also of lower metamorphic grade and lithologically comparable to the TPU, overrides the paragneisses of the Lower Gneiss Unit from the southwest. The Saint-Mathieu dome has upturned the nappe pile at its eastern edge so that the normally hidden Parautochthonous Micaschist Unit now appears at the surface.

Similar structural relationships can be seen in the Millesvaches Massif east of the central synform. The Millesvaches Massif is also oriented North-South and consists like the Saint-Mathieu dome largely of intrusive rocks rimmed by micaschists of the PMU. With 160 kilometers it has a much larger meridional extension though. The 35 kilometers for the Saint-Mathieu dome most likely are only a minimal value as a possible extension of the dome underneath the sediments of the Aquitaine Basin has not been verified yet.

== Literature ==
- Briand, Bernard et al. Feuille Châlus. Carte géologique de la France à 1/50 000. BRGM, Orléans
- Chèvremont, P. et al. Feuille Rochechouart. Carte géologique de la France à 1/50 000. BRGM, Orléans
- Floc'h, J.-P. et al. Feuille La Rochefoucauld. Carte géologique de la France à 1/50 000. BRGM, Orléans
- Floc’h, J.-P. et al. Feuille Montbron. Carte géologique de la France à 1/50 000. BRGM, Orléans
- Floc’h, J.-P. et al. Feuille Nontron. Carte géologique de la France à 1/50 000. BRGM, Orléans
- Guillot, P.-L. et al. Feuille Thiviers. Carte géologique de la France à 1/50 000. BRGM, Orléans
