= Nontronnais =

- Natural region
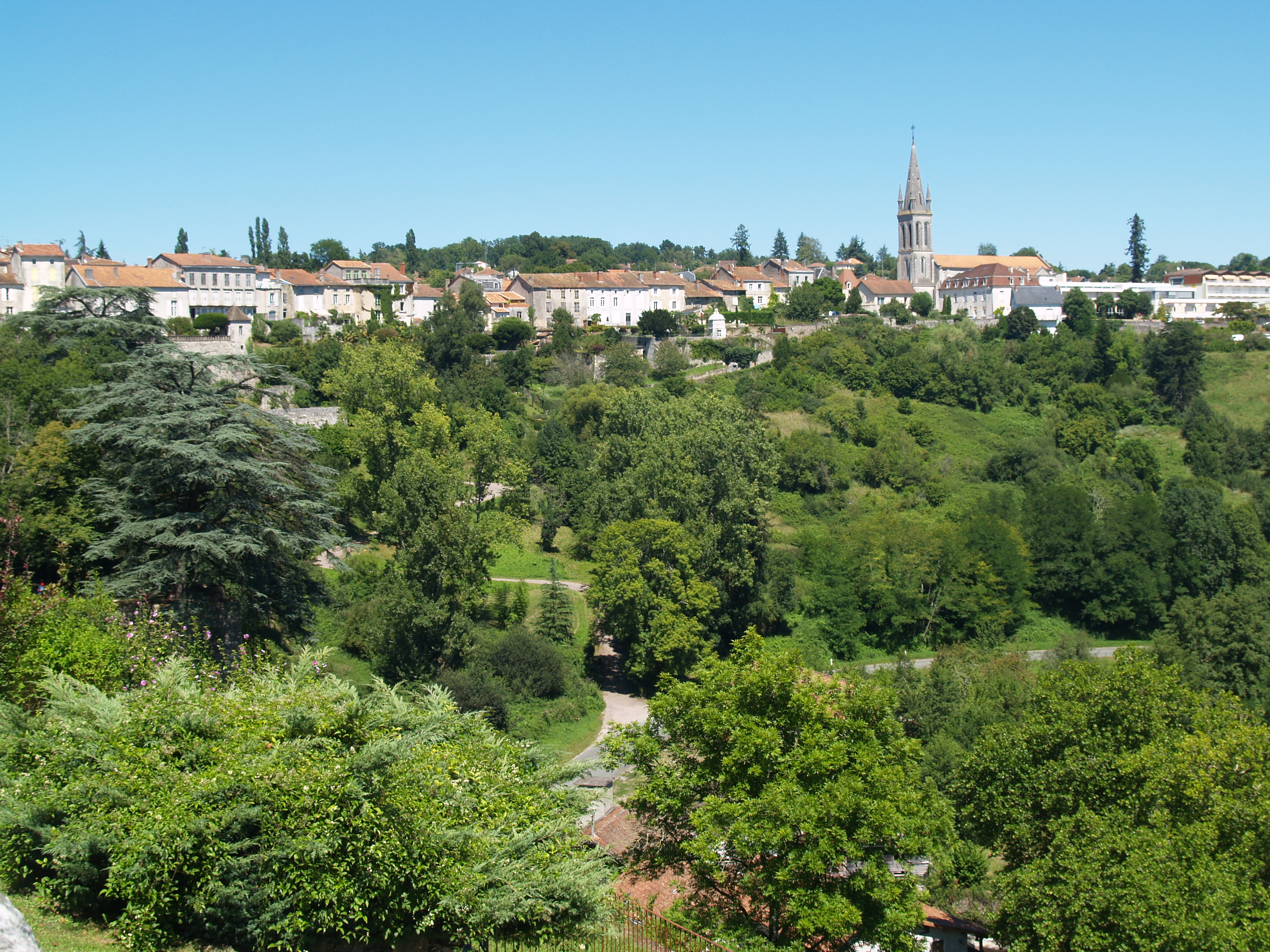
- Nontron overlooking the Bandiat valley

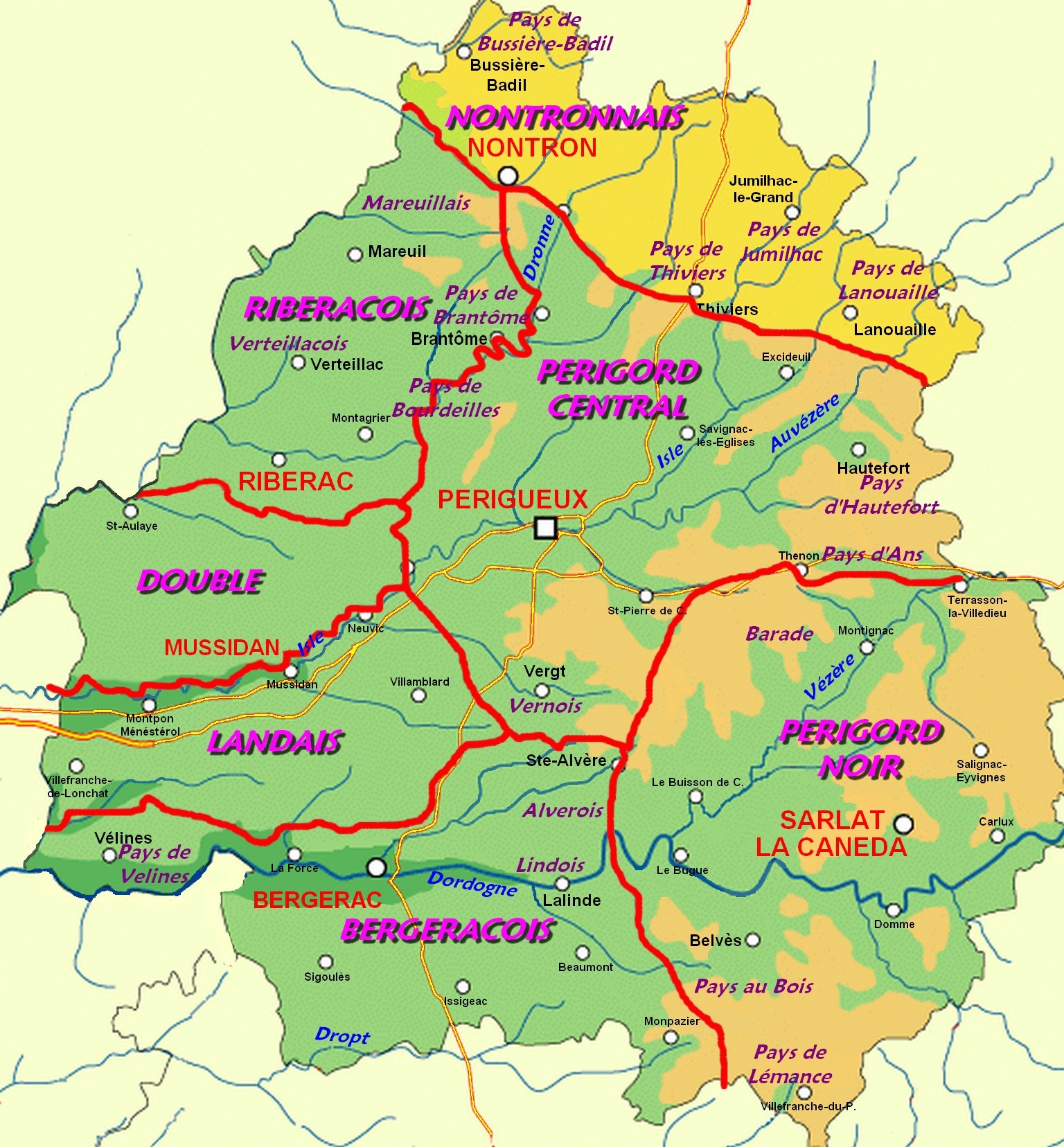
- The Nontronnais in relation with the other traditional landscapes of the Périgord
- region: Nouvelle-Aquitaine

Area
  - Total: 560.25 km^{2} (216.31 sq mi)
- Elevation: 220 m (720 ft)

Population (2014)
  - Total: 15,567
  - Density: 28/km^{2} (73/sq mi)

The Nontronnais is a natural region in the northern Dordogne département and therefore part of Nouvelle-Aquitaine. It covers the surrounding of the centrally placed subprefecture Nontron. Jules Verne had called the Nontronnais Périgord vert (Green Périgord) referring to the region's lush vegetation. The term Périgord vert is used mainly in tourism, but is not identical with the Nontronnais, which covers a much smaller area.

== Geography ==
The Nontronnais is situated in the far north of the Dordogne. Administratively it is composed of the Communauté de communes du Périgord vert nontronnais and the Communauté de communes du Haut-Périgord, which have fused by now to become the Communauté de communes du Périgord Nontronnais. It contains 28 communes and was inhabited in 2014 by 15,567 people. The surface area of the Nontronnais is 560.25 square kilometres resulting in a population density of 28 inhabitants per square kilometre — a rather low figure.

Some authors restrict the Nontronnais only to the Communauté de communes du Périgord vert nontronnais with its 17 communes.

The Nontronnais is surrounded by the following natural regions: in the north by the Pays de la Vienne in the Haute-Vienne département, in the east by the Pays d'Uzerche and by the Pays de Brive in the Corrèze département, in the south by the Périgord central and by the Ribéracois in the Dordogne département and in the west by the Pays d'Horte et Tardoire in the Charente département.

Attributed to the Nontronnais can be four more territories:

- the surroundings of Bussière-Badil
- the surroundings of Thiviers
- the surroundings of Jumilhac-le-Grand
- the surroundings of Lanouaille.

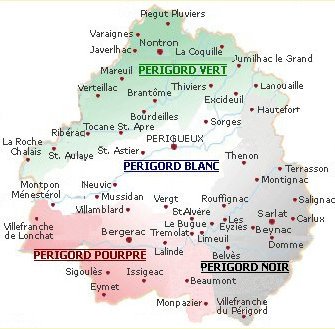
The four touristic regions of the Périgord

Topographically the Nontronnais covers the northwestern fringe of the French Massif Central and this explains why it is sometimes referred to as Périgord limousin. Its relief is taken up by undulating plateaus varying in elevation between 200 and 370 meters. These plateaus dip slightly to the southwest and have been incised by the rivers Auvézère, Bandiat, Isle, and Loue, the canyons being covered by abundant vegetation. The local climate is under the influence of the Atlantic Ocean with about a 1000 millimetres in yearly precipitation. This rather damp climate causes a very lush vegetation governed by chestnut, oak, spruce, Scots Pine, ferns, heath, gorse and reeds. .

The touristic term Périgord vert has got a wider definition as it includes besides the Nontronnais also a small part of the northern Périgord central and the Ribéracois, which belong to the Périgord blanc. The latter two territories are underlain by Mesozoic limestones and therefore completely differ geologically from the Nontronnais dominated by Variscan basement rocks.

== Geology ==
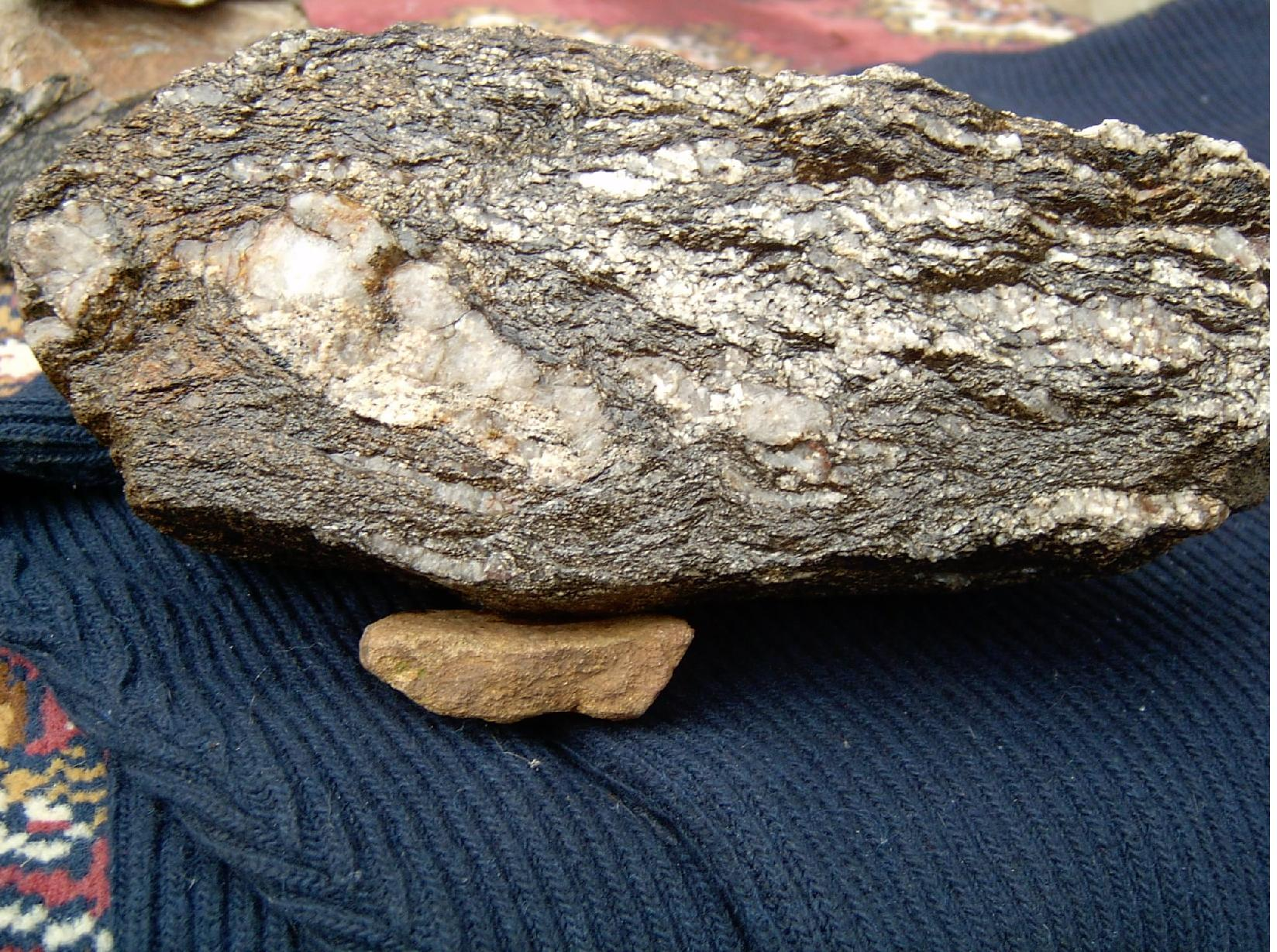
Plagioclase-rich paragneiss from Nontron

The Nontronnais is traversed from southeast to northwest by a very important geological boundary separating basement rocks in the northeast from flat lying sediments of the Aquitaine Basin in the southwest. This boundary is usually marked by an important fault. The crystalline basement rocks consist of high-grade paragneisses in sillimanite facies and granitoids like the Piégut-Pluviers Granodiorite and the Saint-Mathieu Leucogranite. The sediments of the Aquitaine Basin harbour arkoses, dolomites, shales and various limestones. The border fault starts near Saint-Pardoux-la-Rivière, passes near the lower town of Nontron and continues towards Saint-Martin-le-Pin. The fault is mineralized and was mined for lead, zinc and minor silver. As the mining activities aren't economically viable anymore they stopped.

== History ==
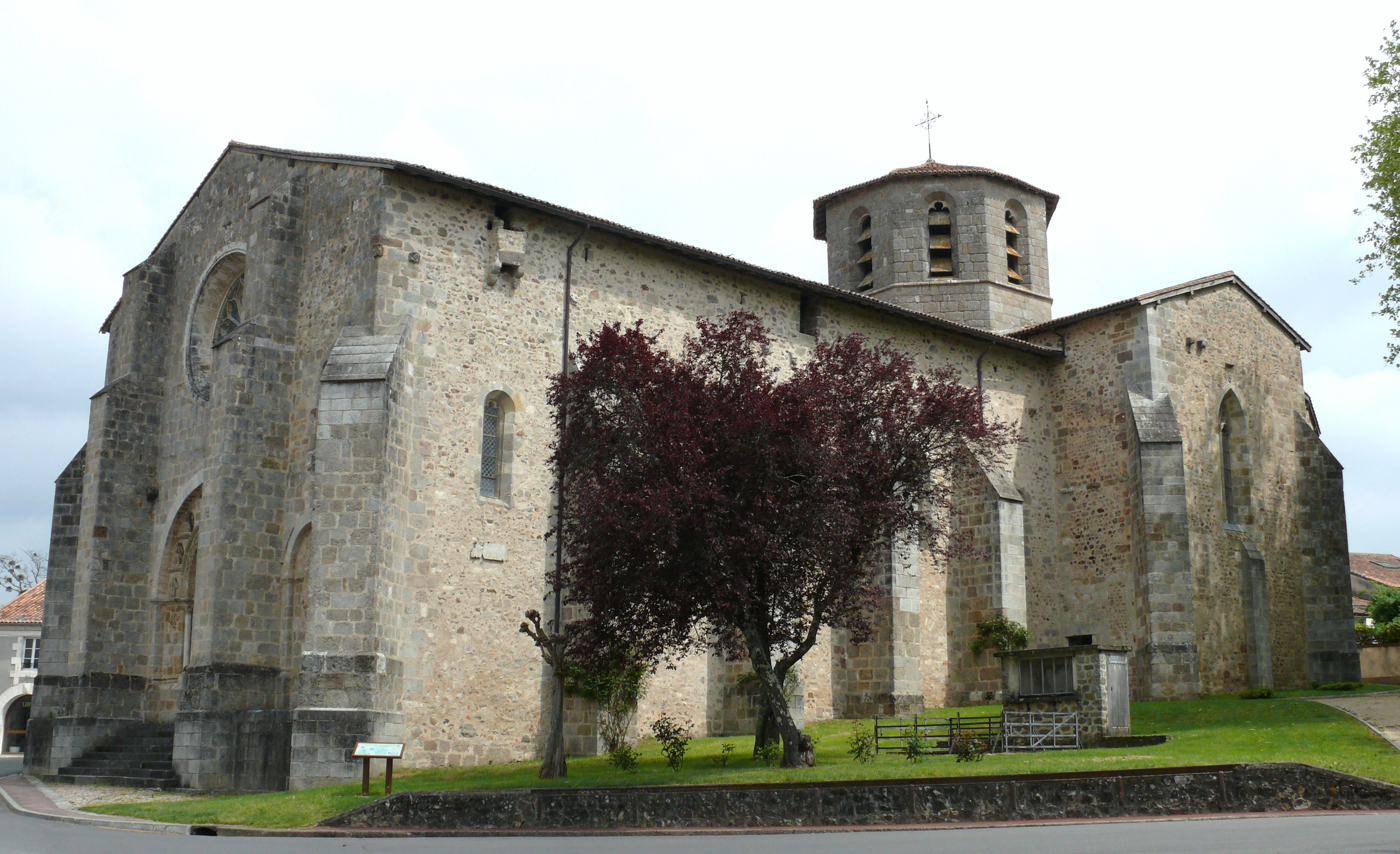
Abbey Notre-Dame-de-la-Nativité in Bussière-Badil

Up to the French Revolution only a few communes in the north of the actual Dordogne département belonged to the Périgord. The parishes of the Archpriest of Nontron were in fact dependent on the Roman Catholic Diocese of Limoges. The vast majority of these parishes was integrated in 1790 into the newly created Dordogne département. Amongst those parishes were Ajat (now Abjat-sur-Bandiat), Augignac, Busseroles (now Busserolles), Champniers et Reillac (since 1847 Champniers-et-Reilhac), La Chapelle-Montmoreau, Connezac, Javerlhac, Saint-Robert (since 1823 Javerlhac-et-la-Chapelle-Saint-Robert), Millac (now Milhac-de-Nontron), Nontron, Nontronneau (now Lussas-et-Nontronneau), Pluviers (now Piégut-Pluviers), Quinsac, Romain (now Champs-Romain), Saint-Angel (now Sceau-Saint-Angel), Saint-Barthélemy (now Saint-Barthélemy-de-Bussière), Saint-Etienne (now Saint-Estèphe), Saint-Front-de-la-Rivière (now Saint-Front-la-Rivière), Saint-Martial (now Saint-Martial-de-Valette), Saint-Martin-le-Peint (now Saint-Martin-le-Pin), Saint-Pardoux (now Saint-Pardoux-la-Rivière), Saint-Saud (now Saint-Saud-Lacoussière), Teyjac (now Teyjat) and Varaigne (now Varaignes).

== Sites of interest ==
- Château de Frugie
- Château de Jumilhac
- Château de la Renaudie
- Château de Mavaleix
- Château Saulnier
- Château de Vieillecour

== Gallery ==
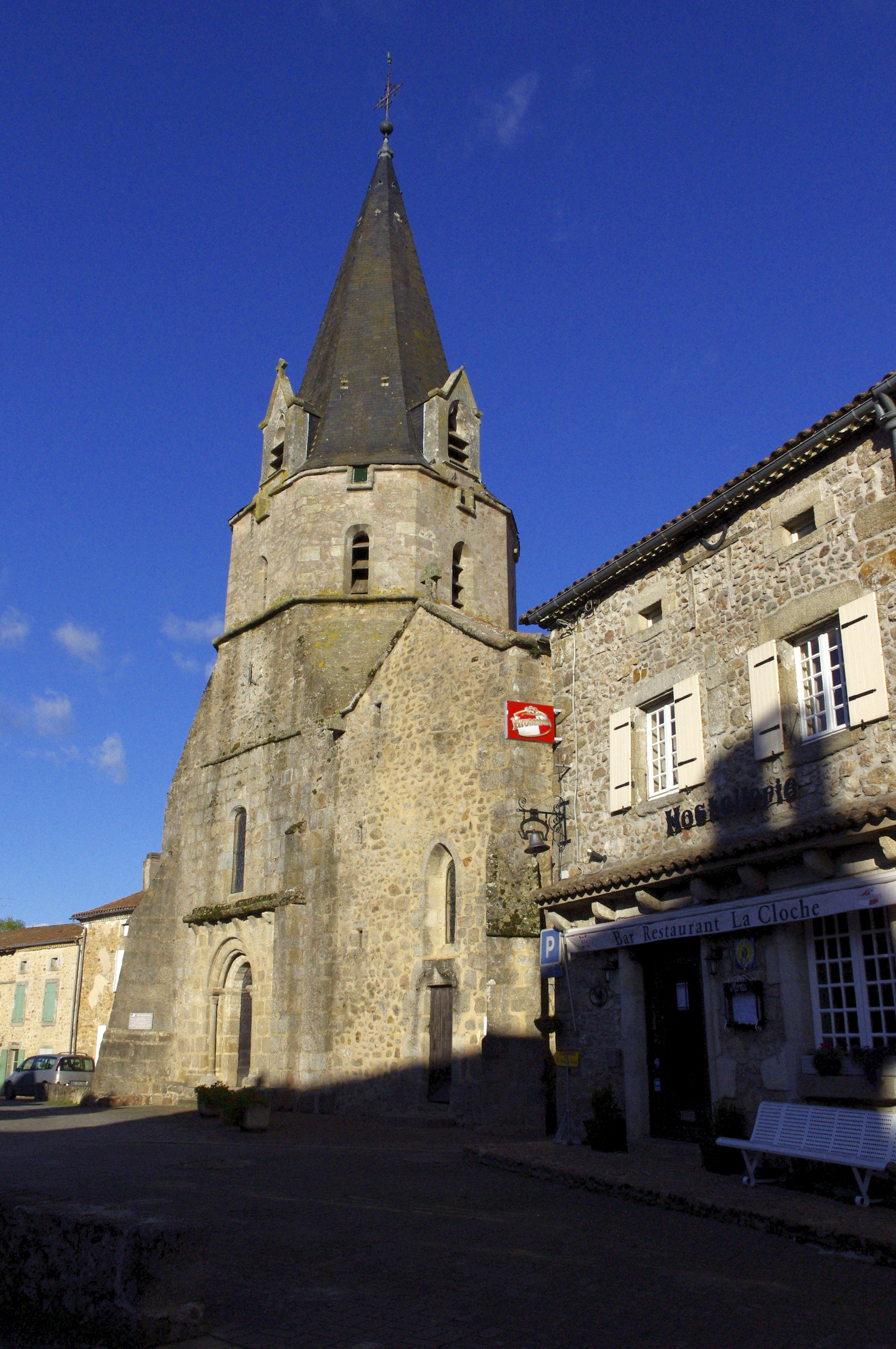
The church Saint-André in Abjat

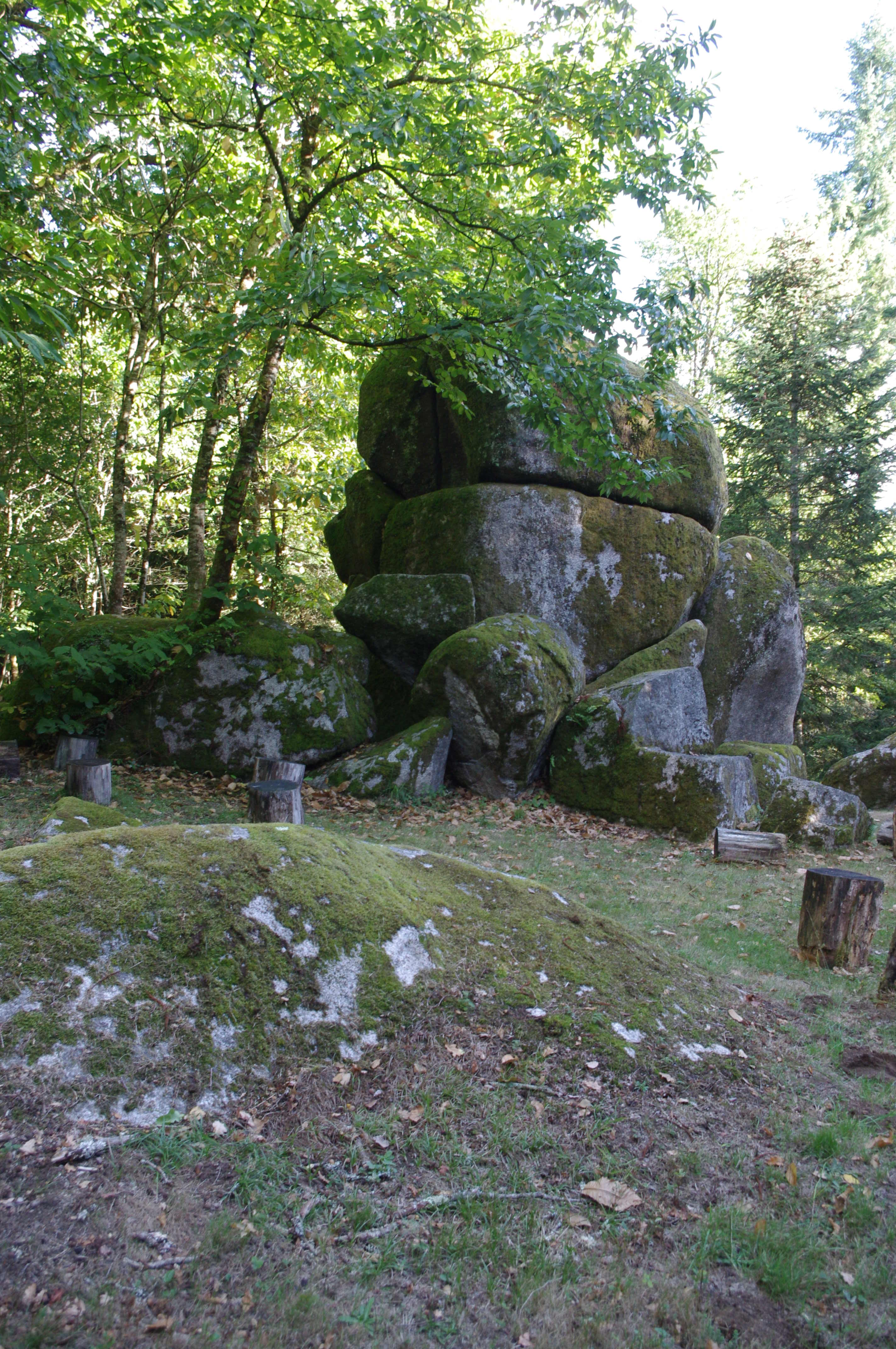
Roche Eyside near Augignac

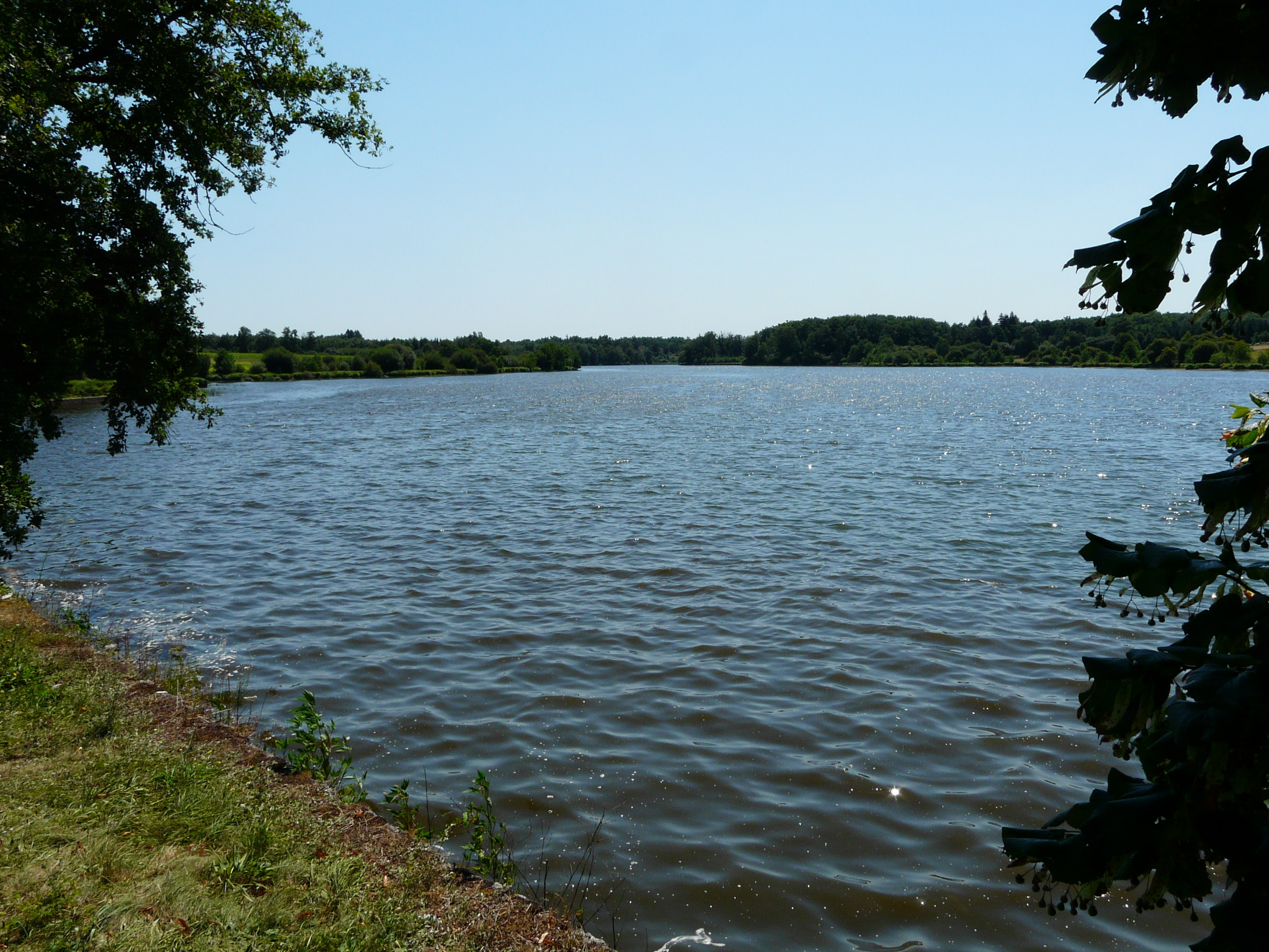
The lake Étang Grolhier near Busserolles

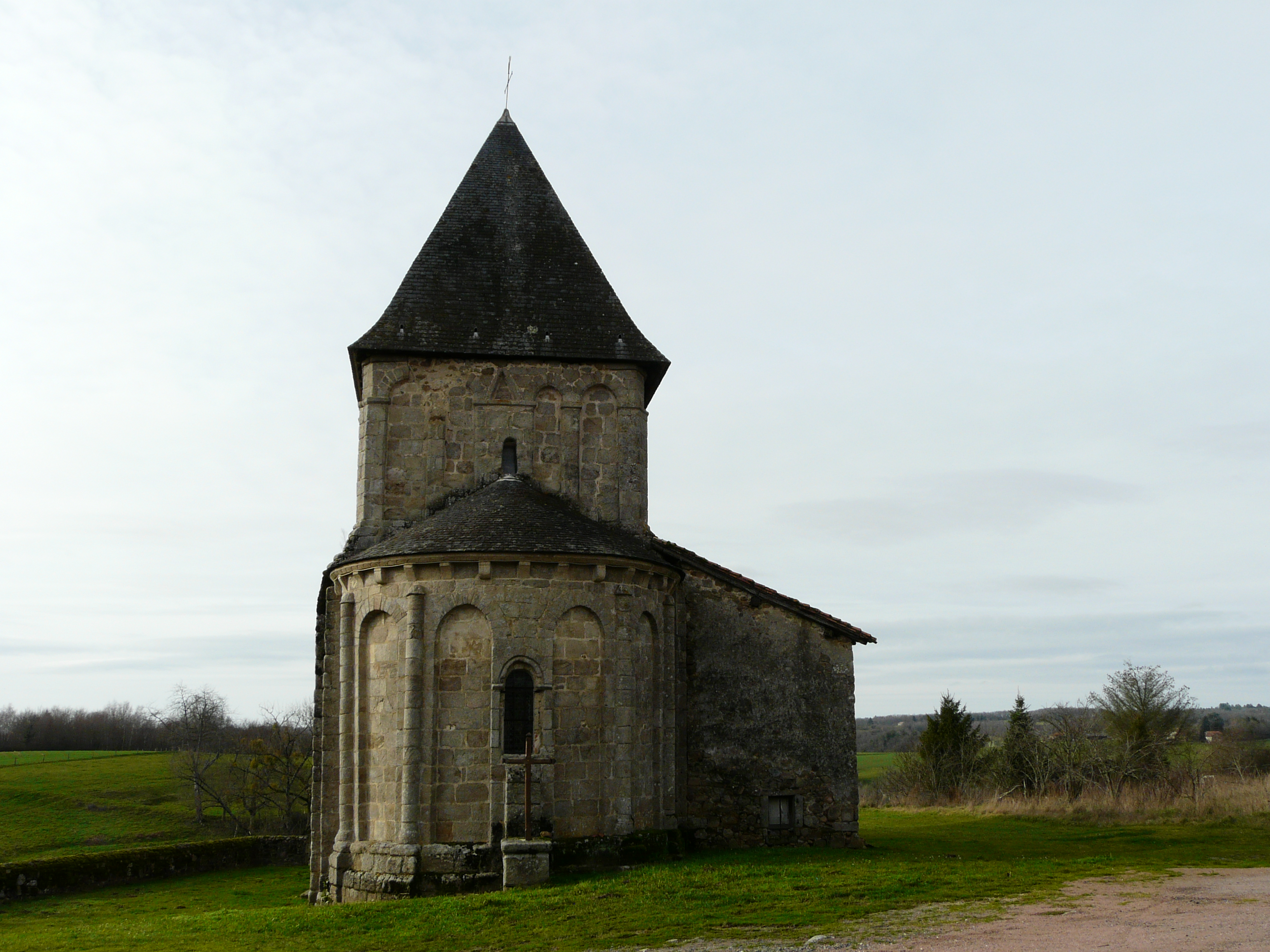
The church Saint-Paul in Reilhac

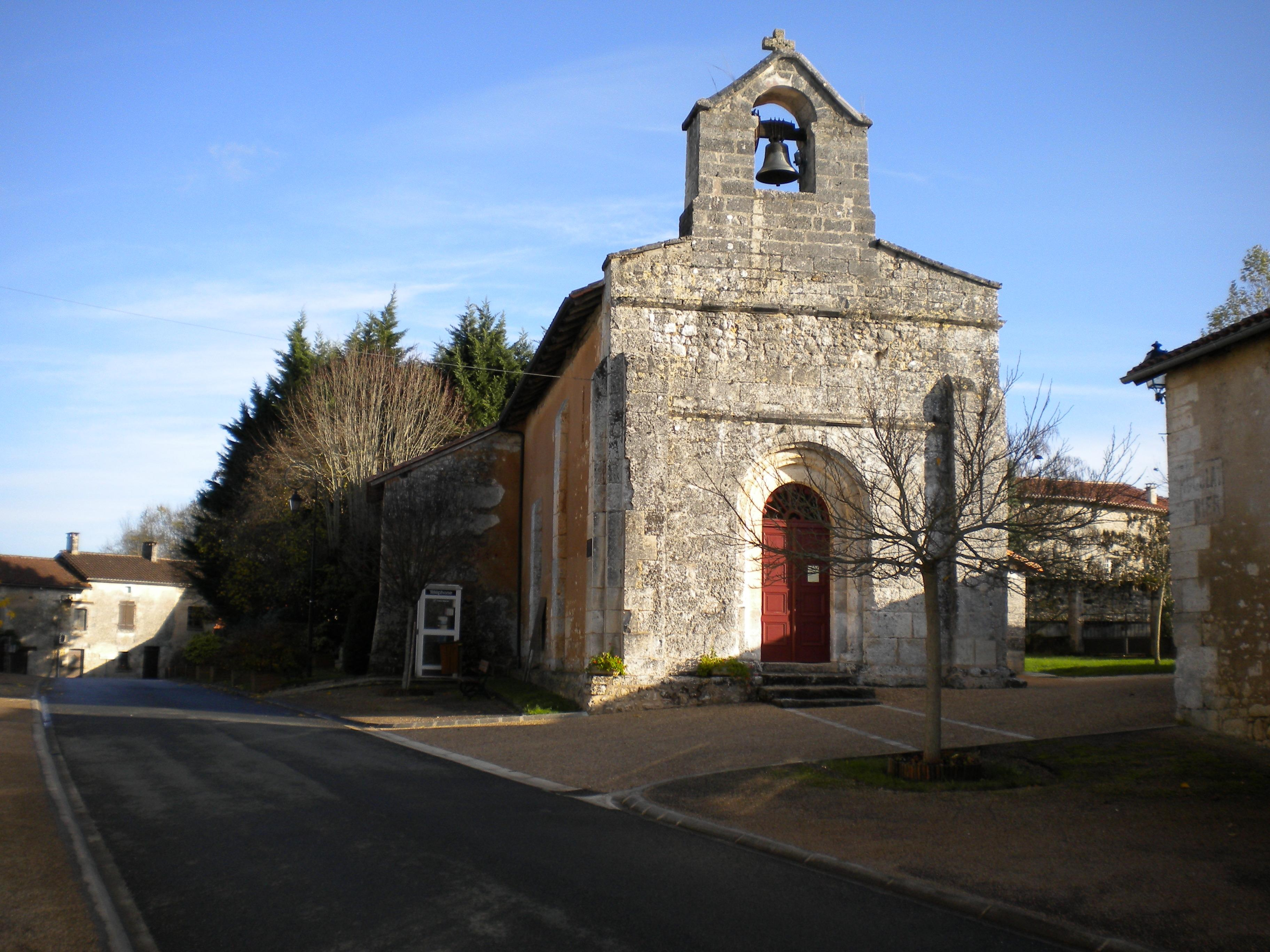
The church Saint-Pierre in La Chapelle-Montmoreau

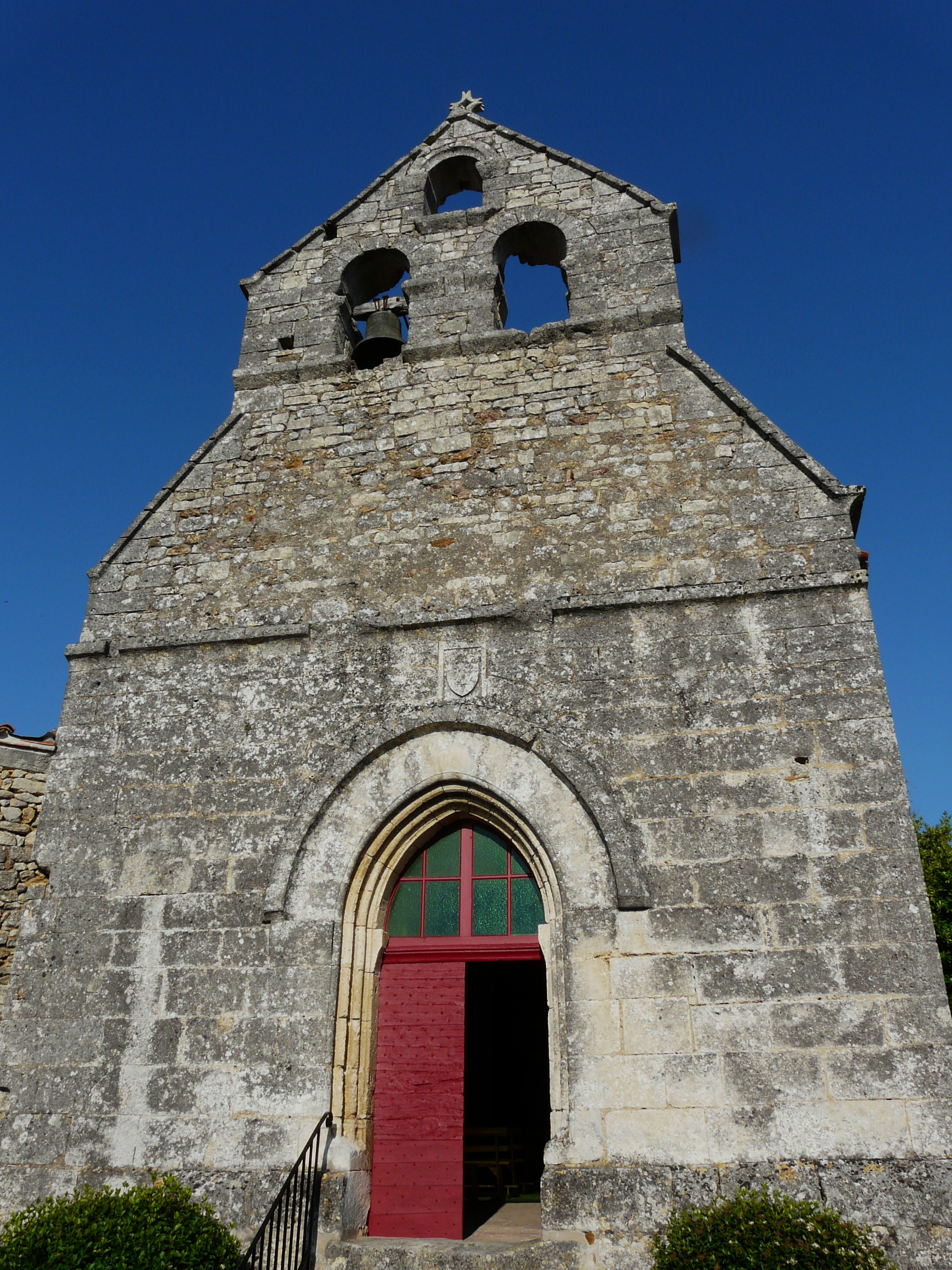
Saint-Martin in Connezac

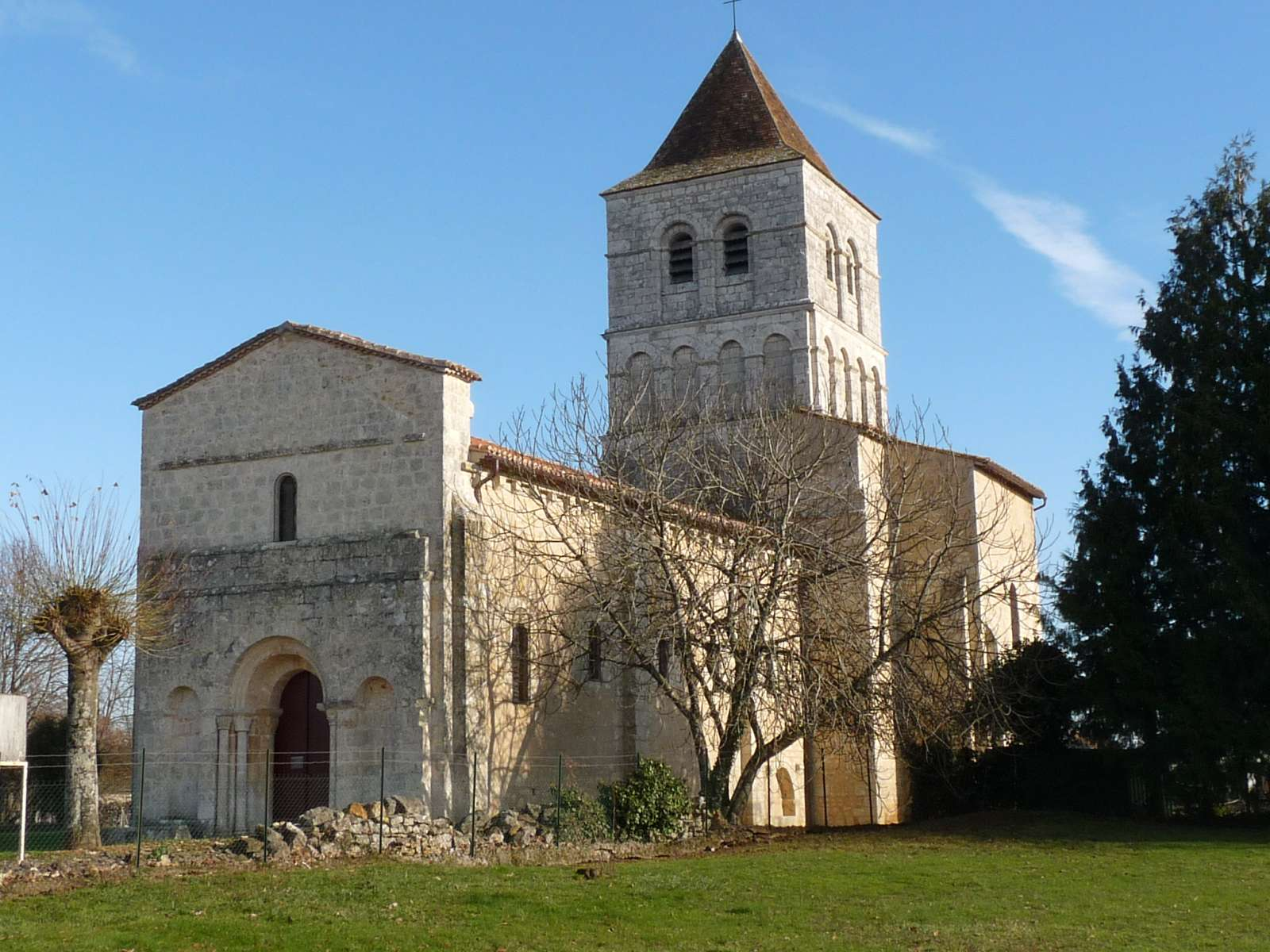
The church Saint-Robert in La Chapelle-Saint-Robert

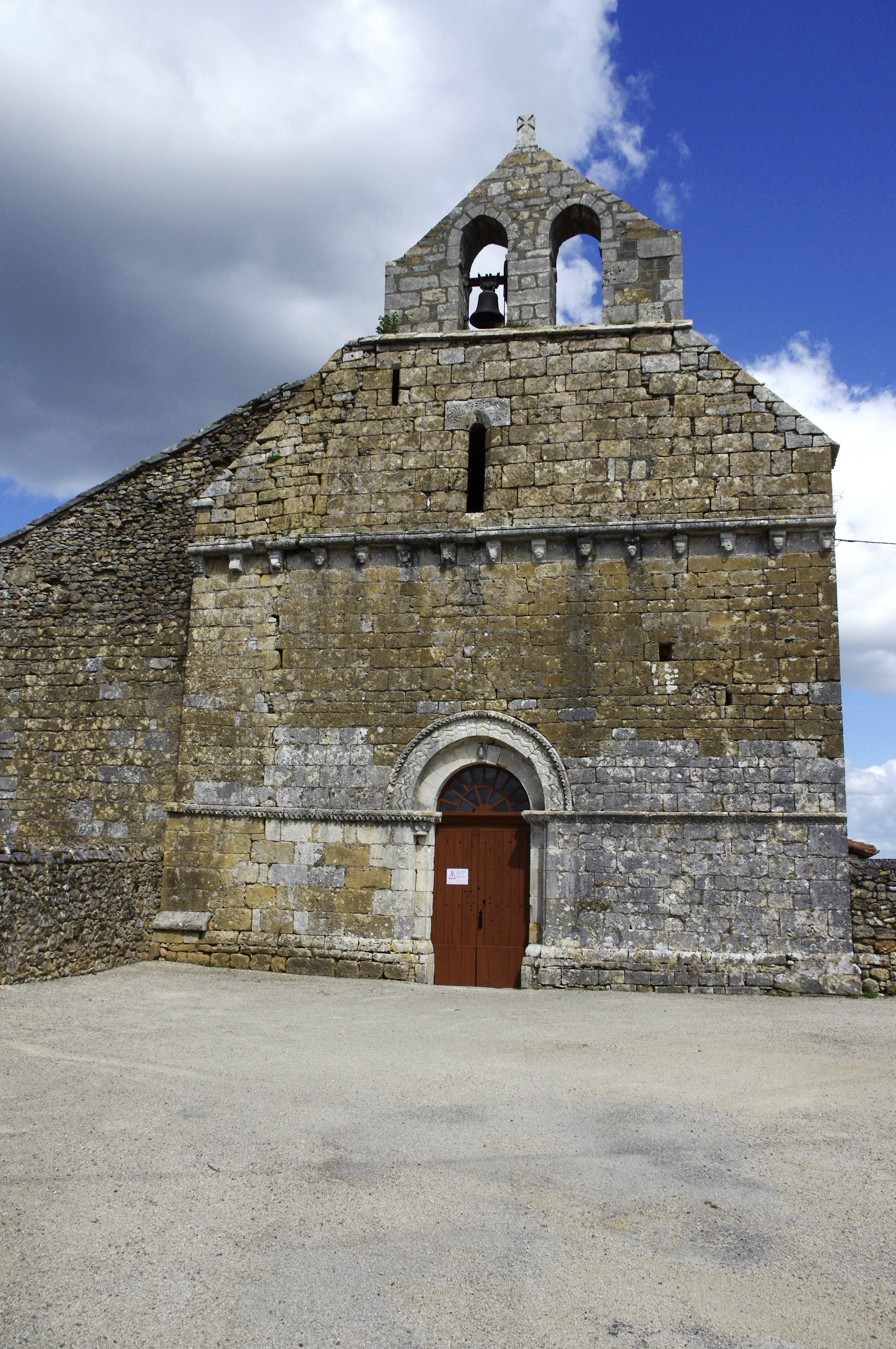
The church Saint-Jean in Nontronneau

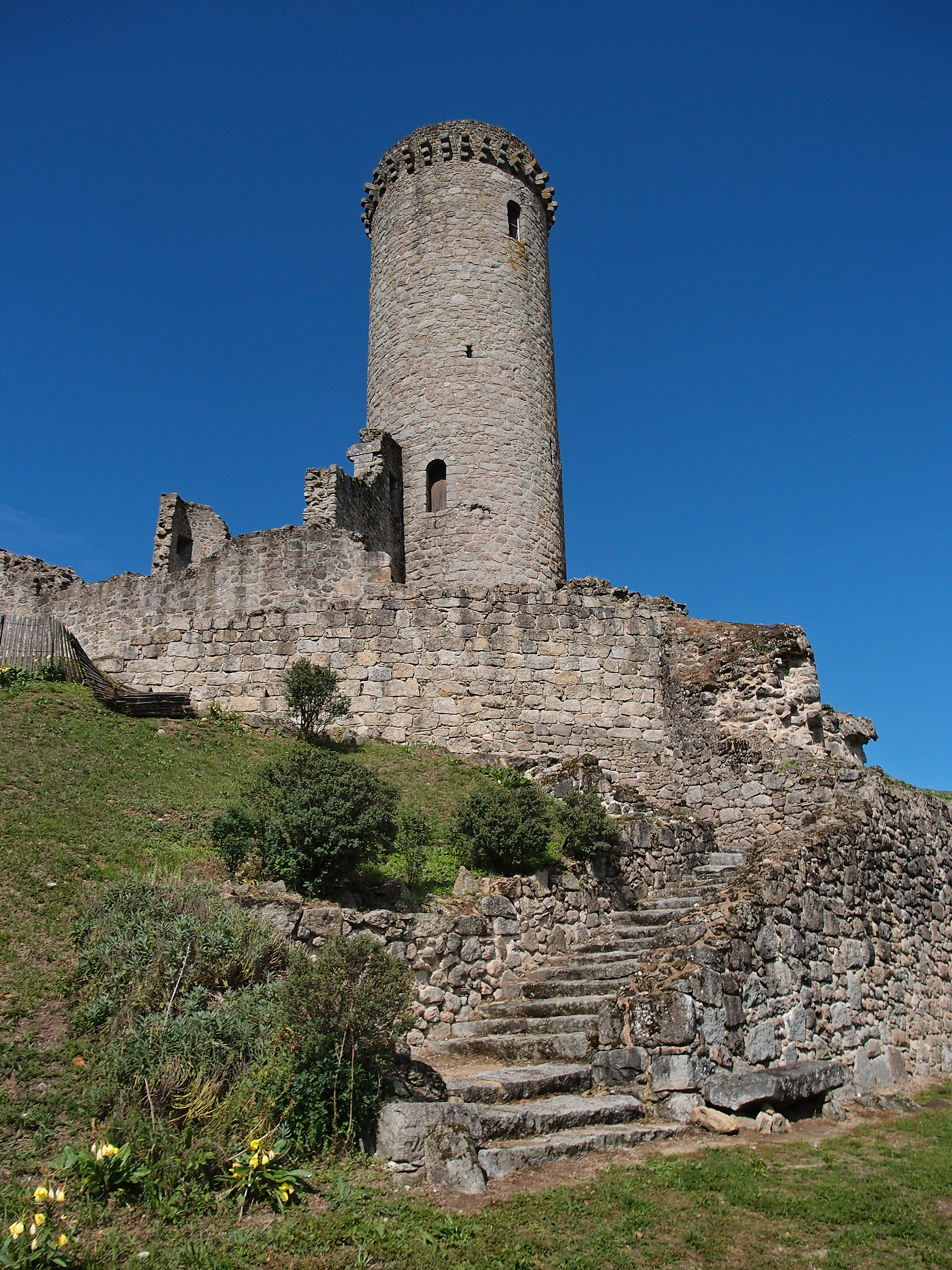
The keep of Piégut

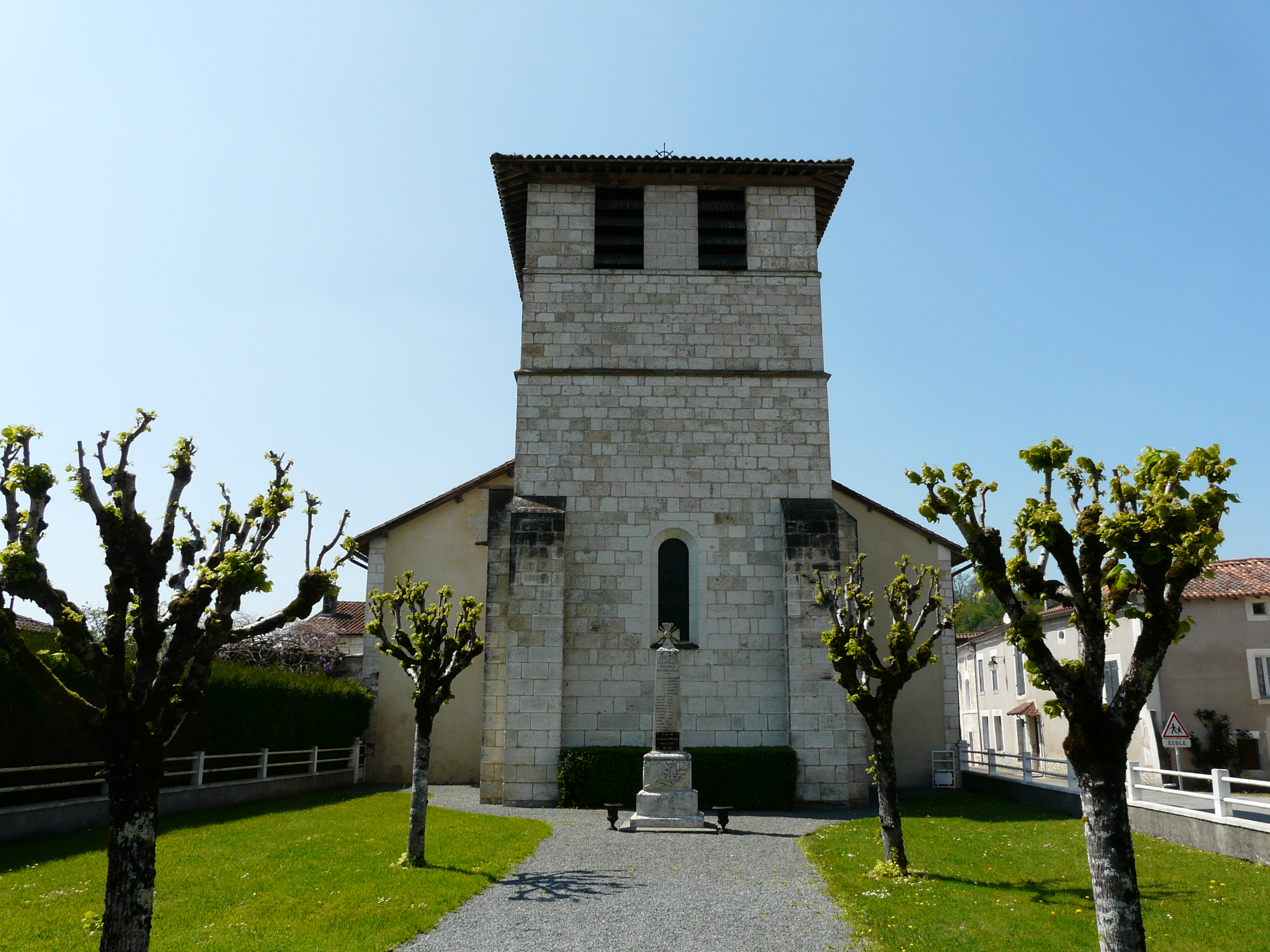
The church Saint-Saturnin in Quinsac

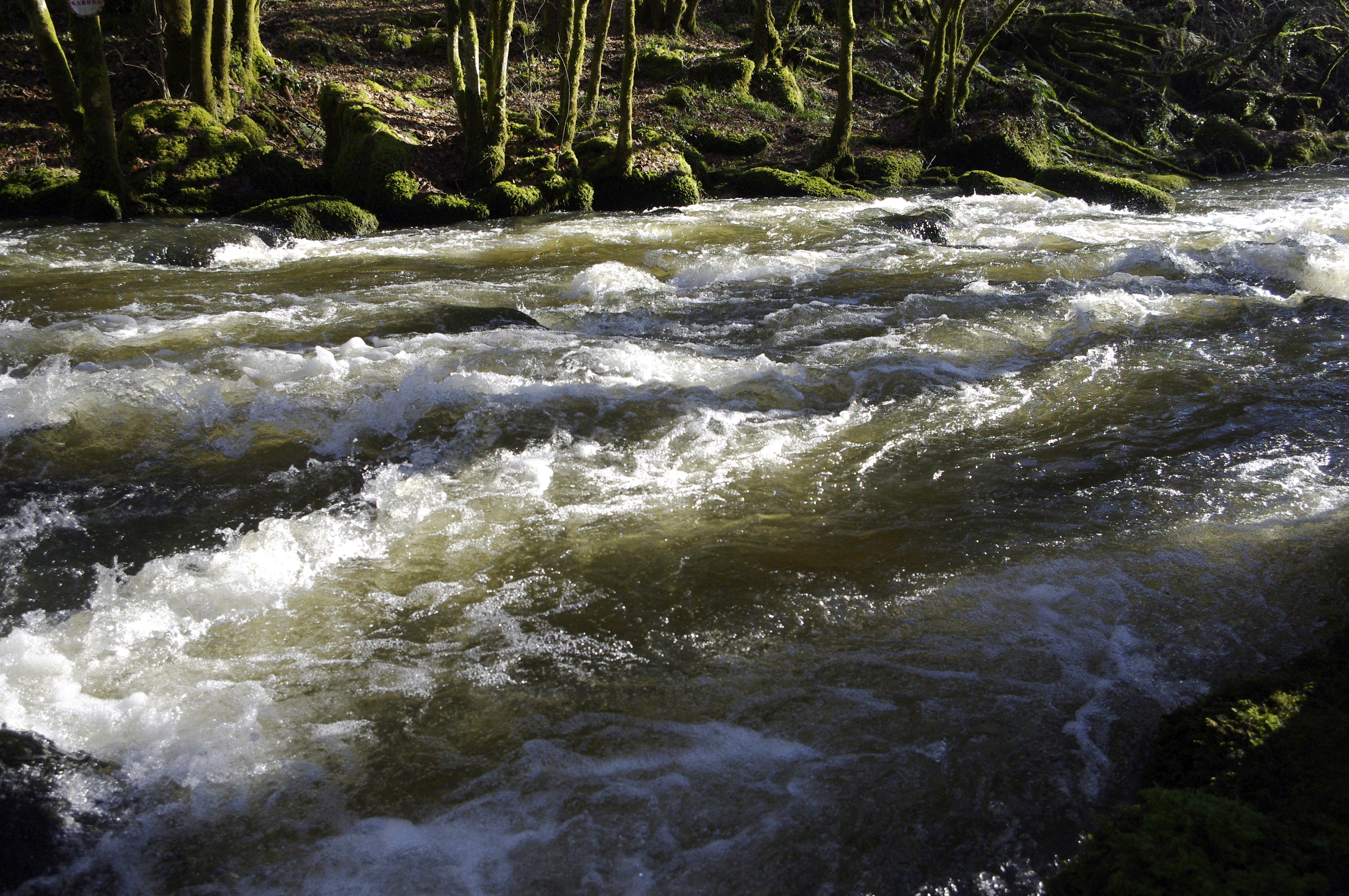
The rapids of the Saut du Chalard in the Dronne river near Champs-Romain

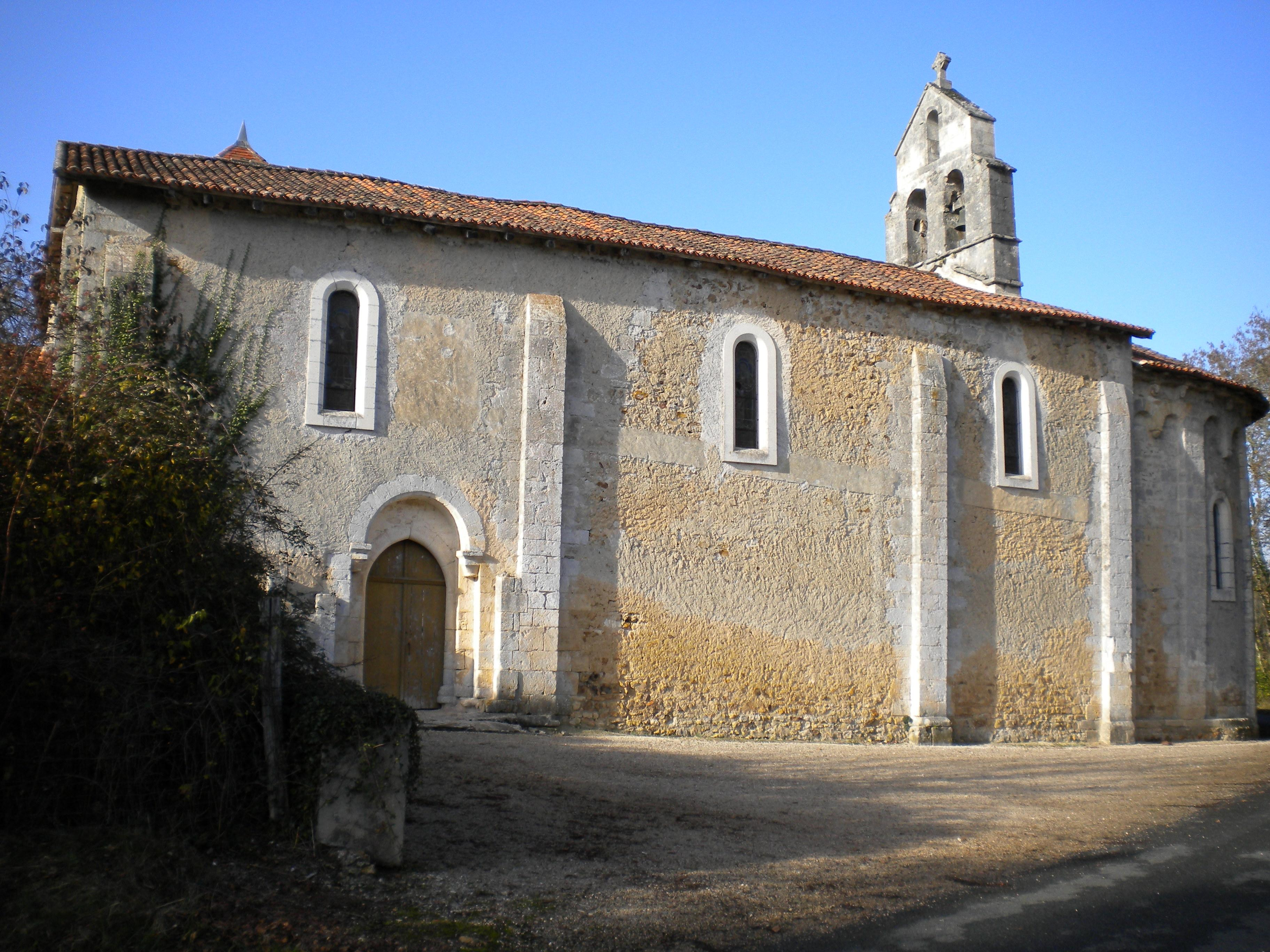
The church Saint-Michel in Saint-Angel

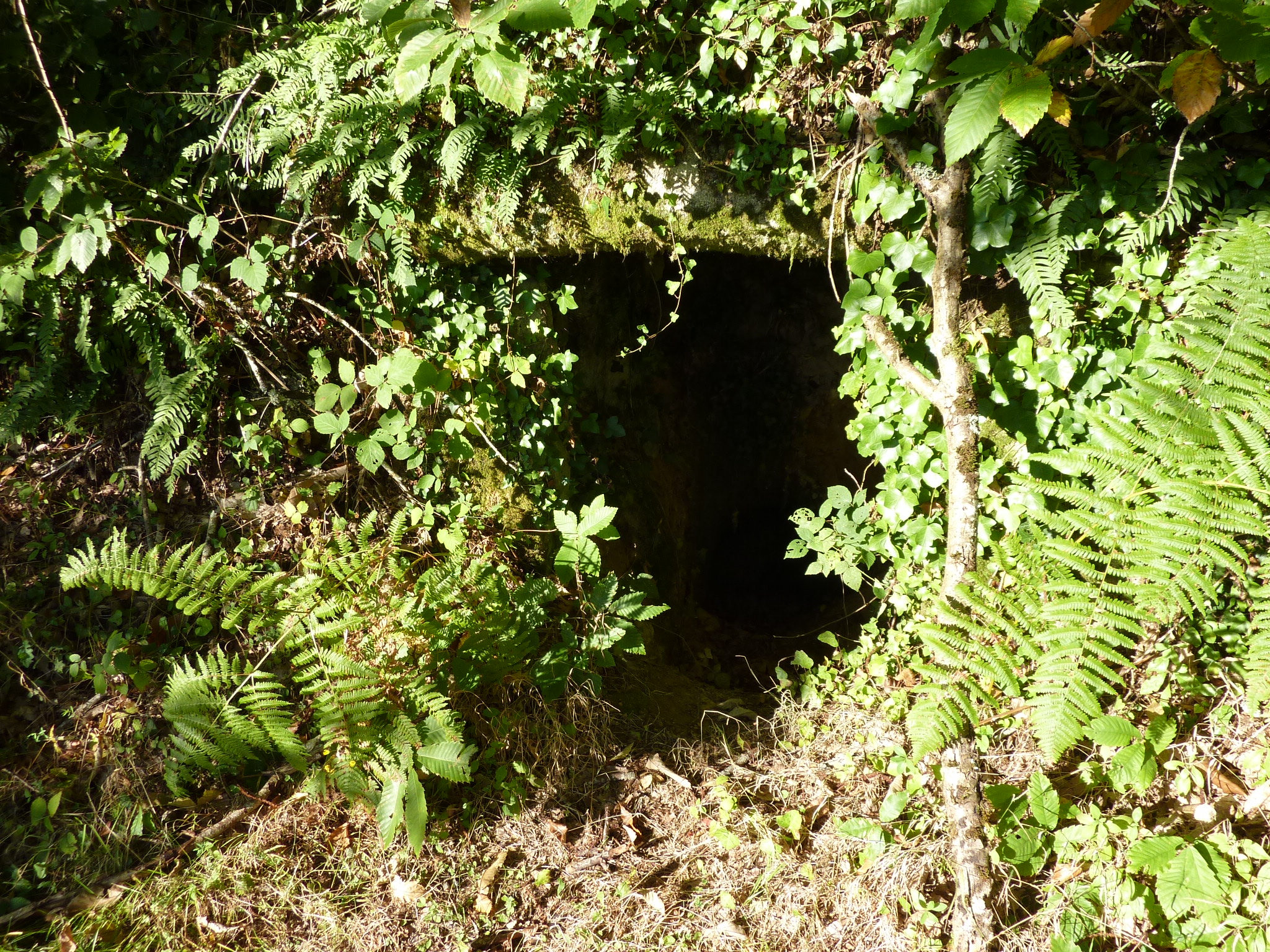
Megalithic burial chamber in La Courarie

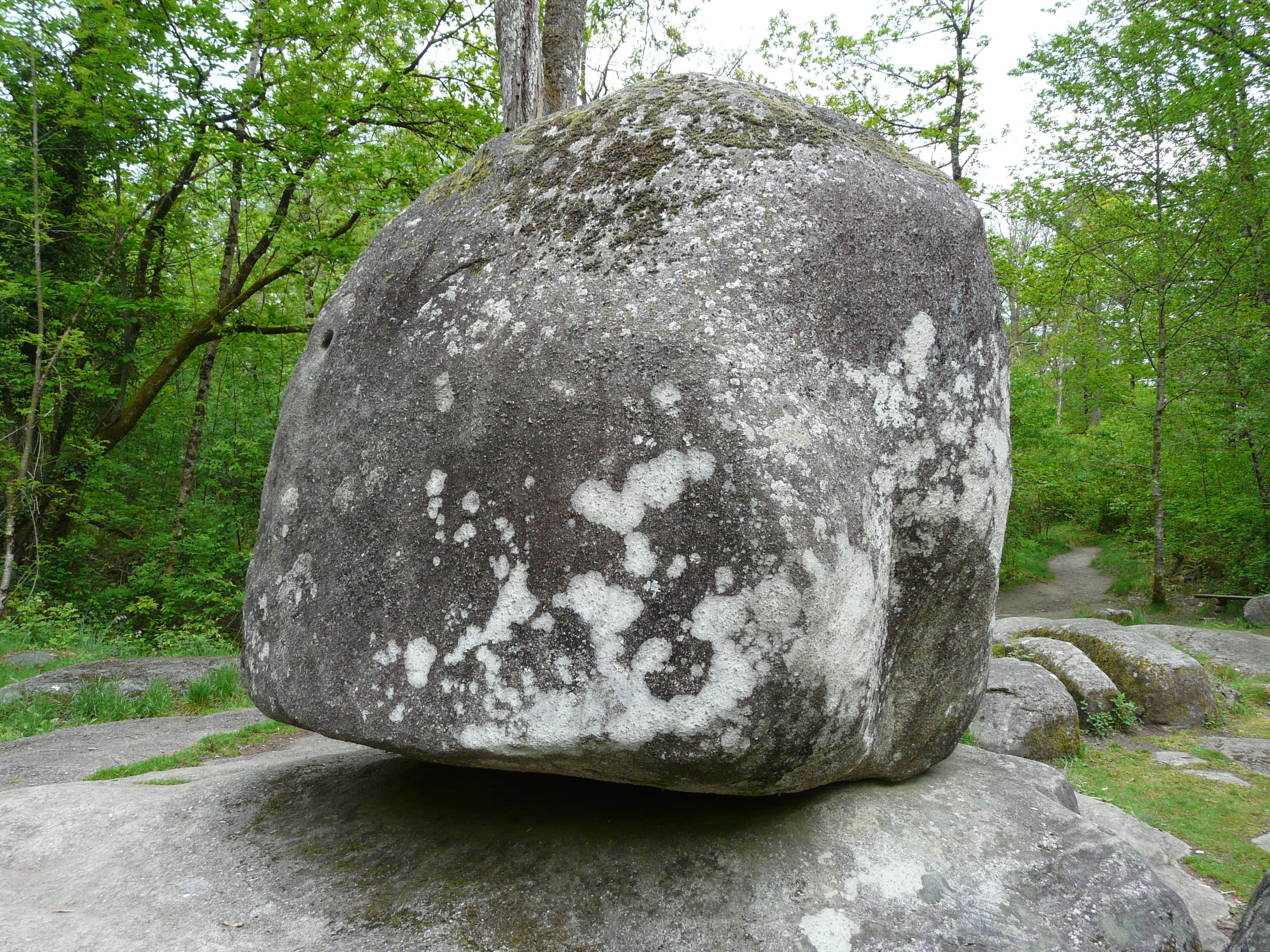
Roc branlant near Saint-Estèphe

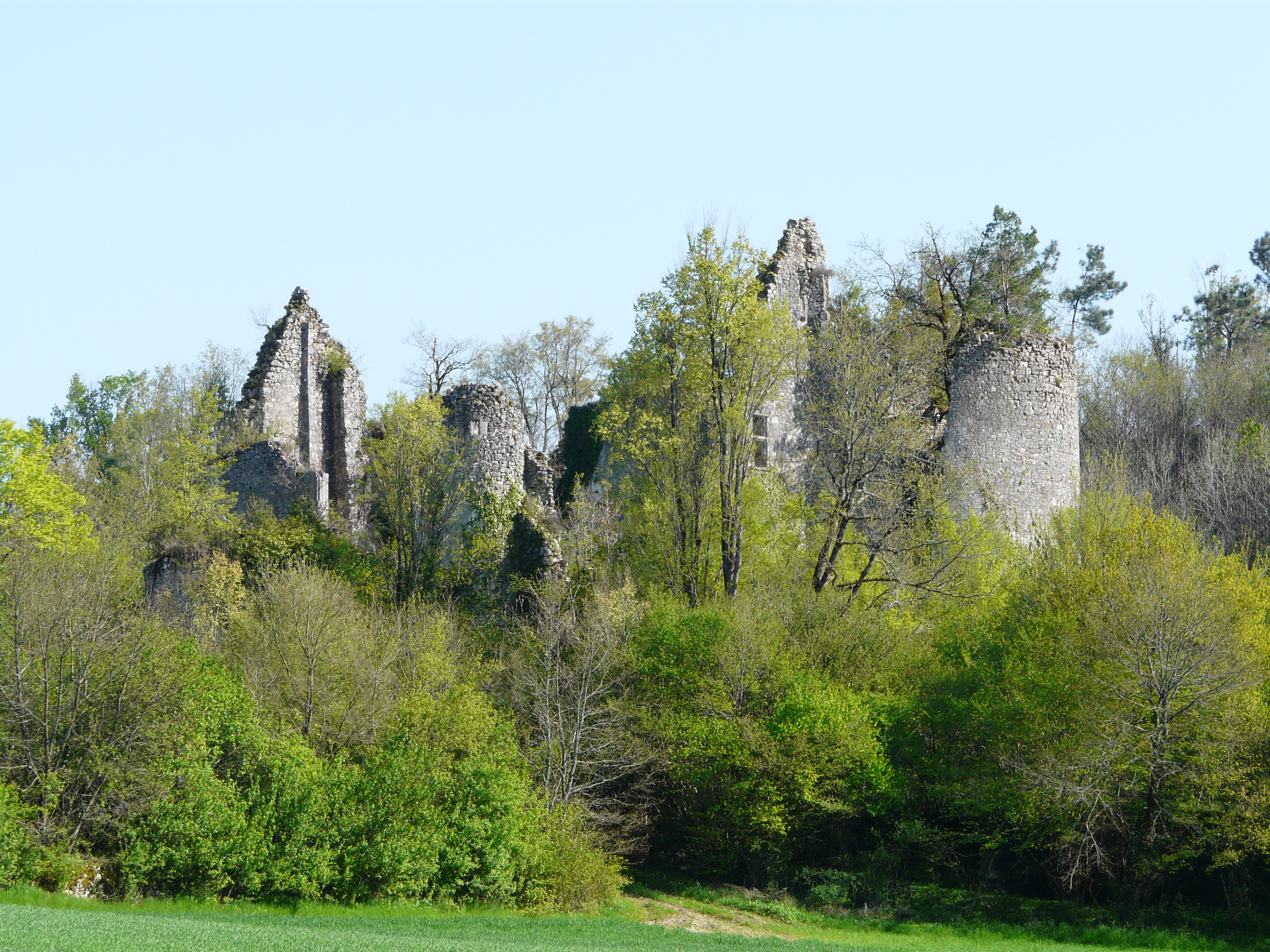
The castle ruin Château de la Renaudie near Saint-Front-la-Rivière

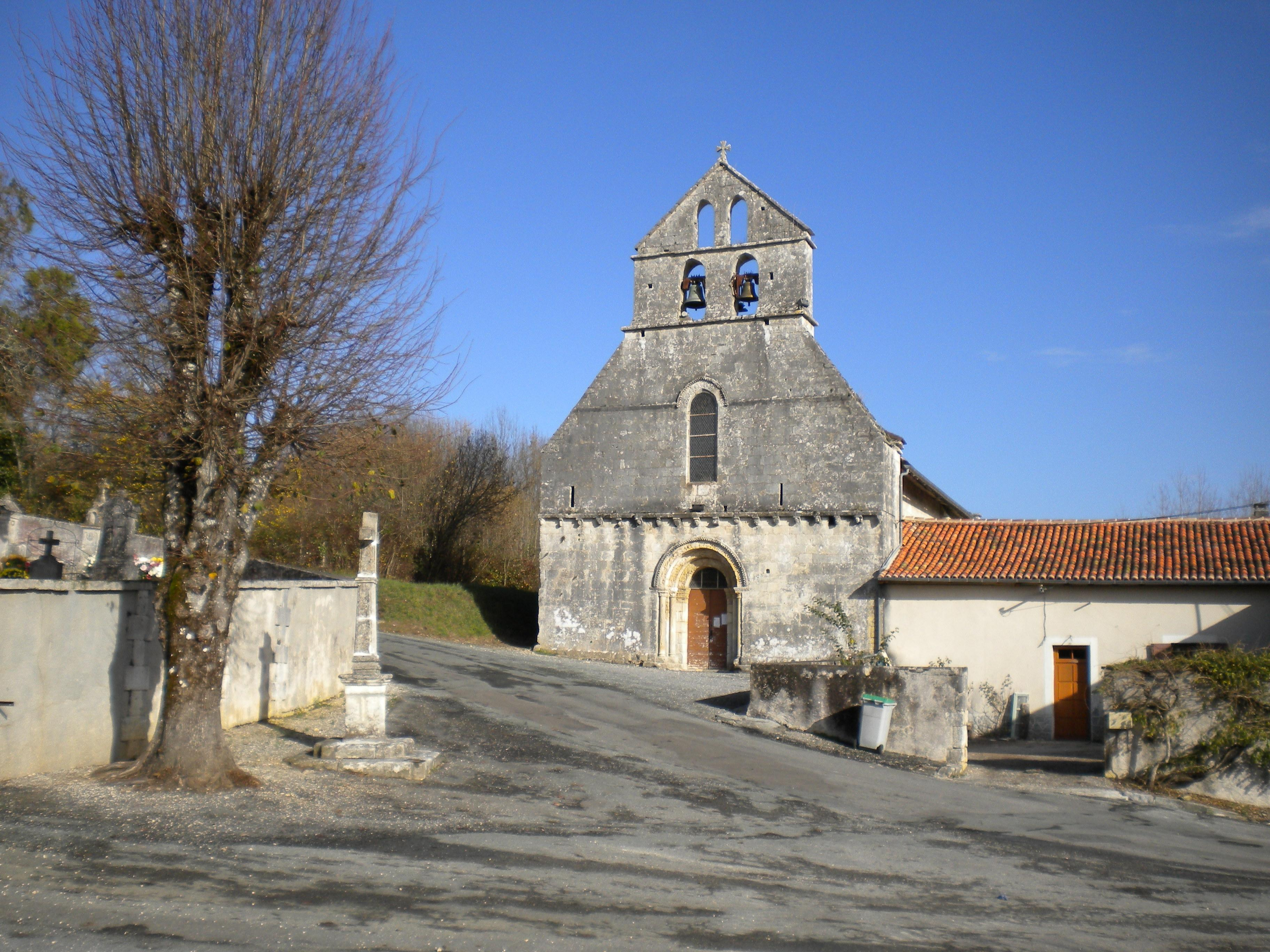
The church Saint-Martial in Saint-Martial-de-Valette

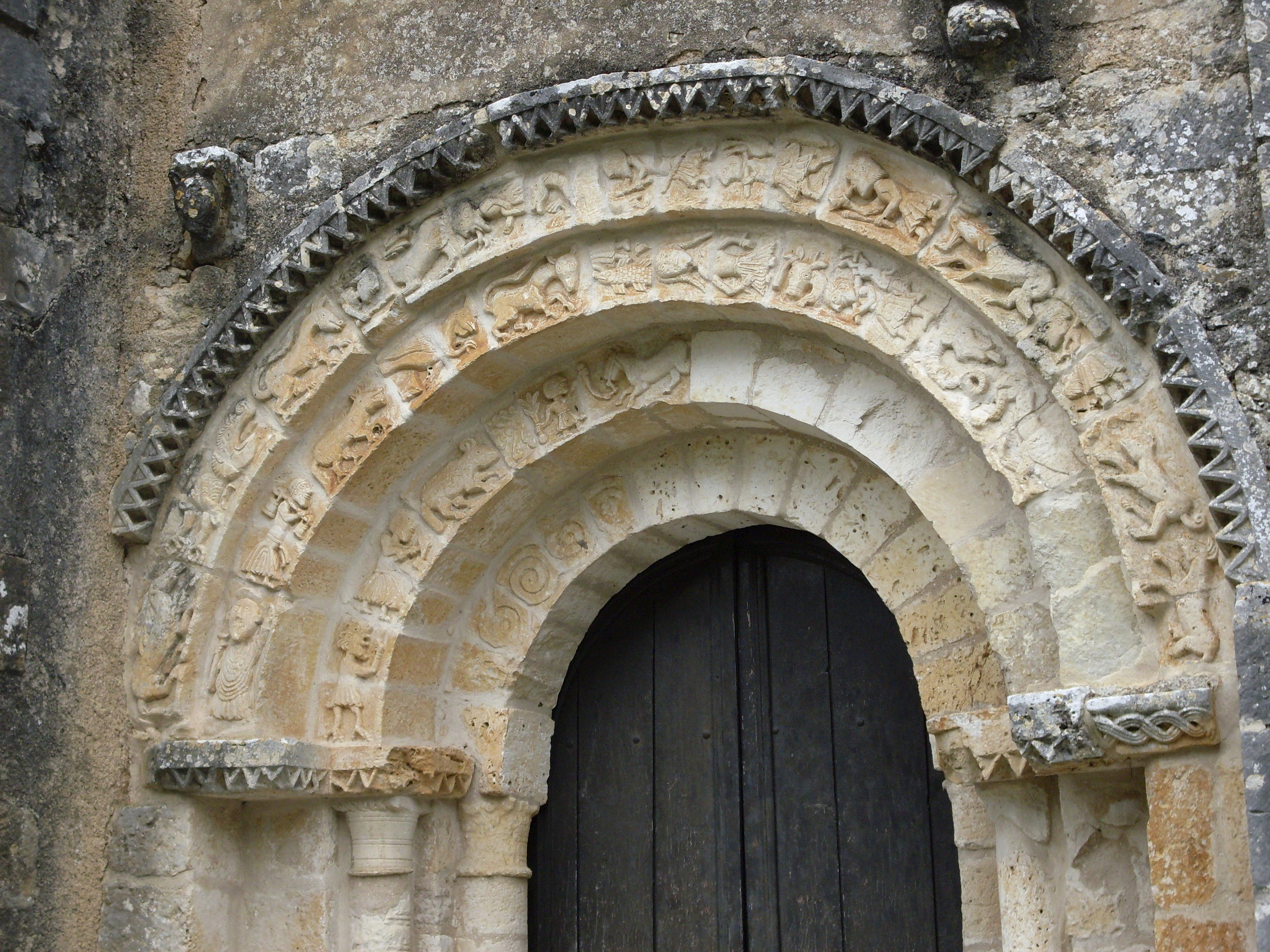
Church entry in Saint-Martin-le-Pin

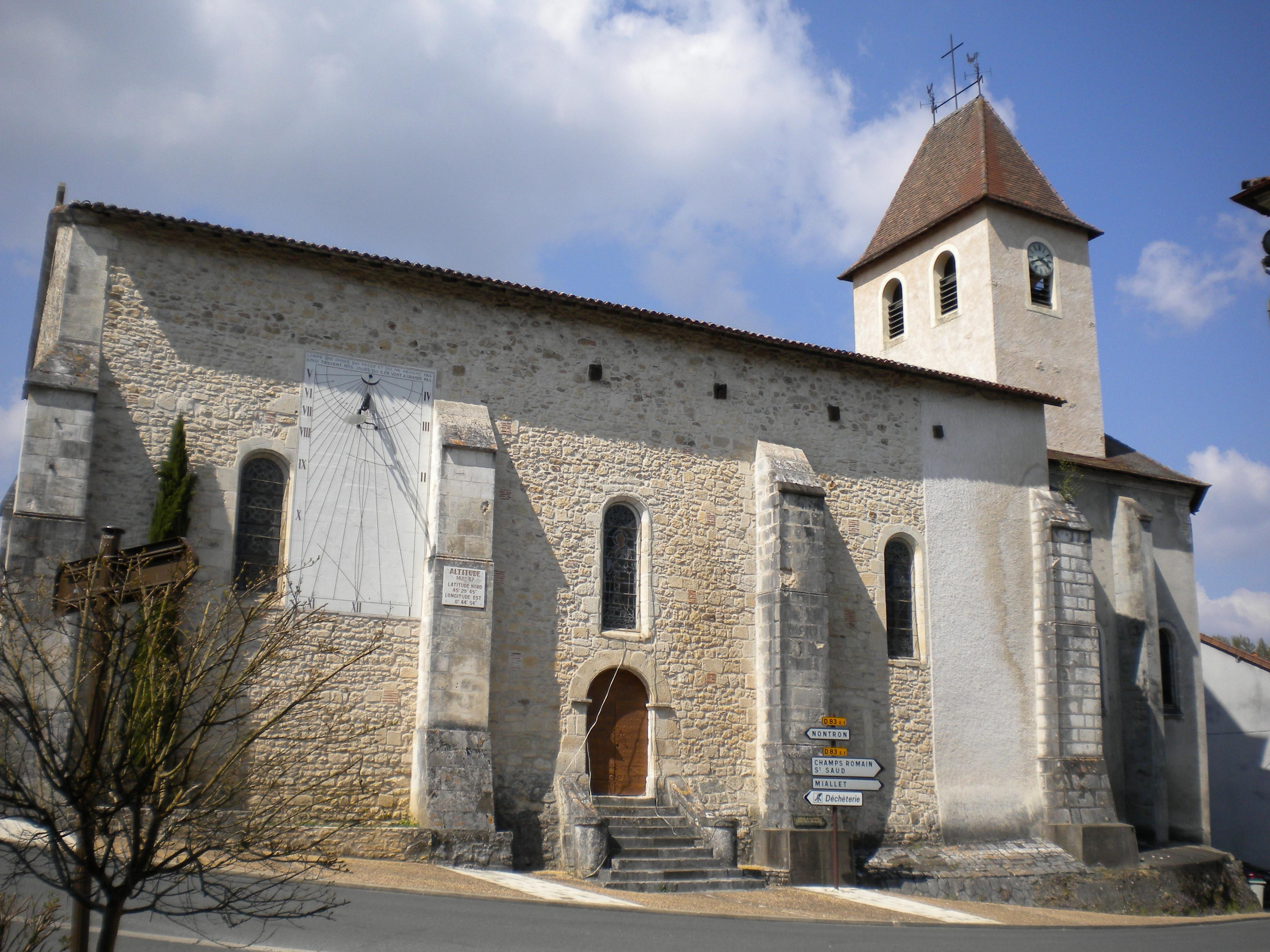
The church Saint-Pardoux in Saint-Pardoux-la-Rivière

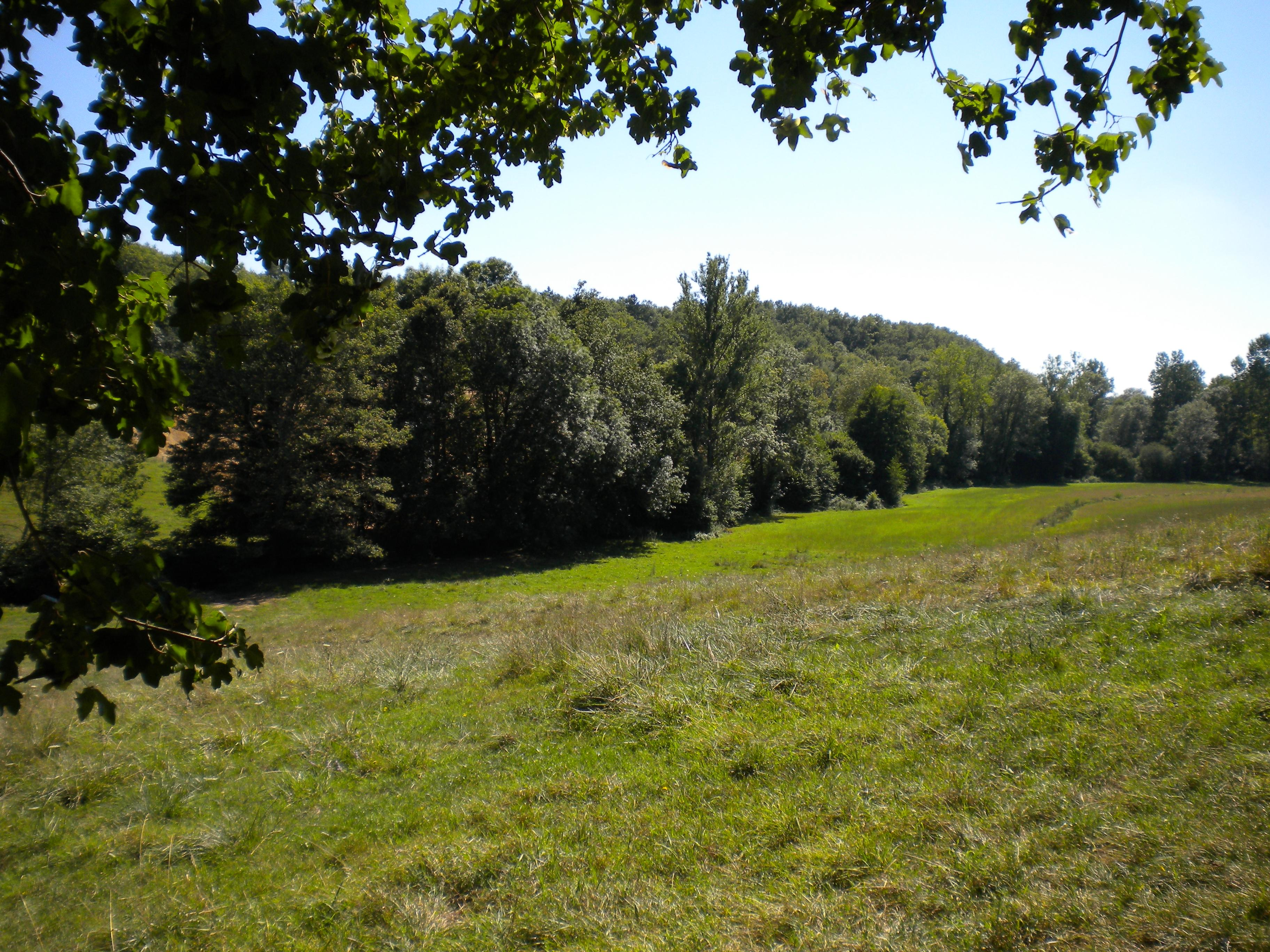
The Marcourive valley near Teyjat

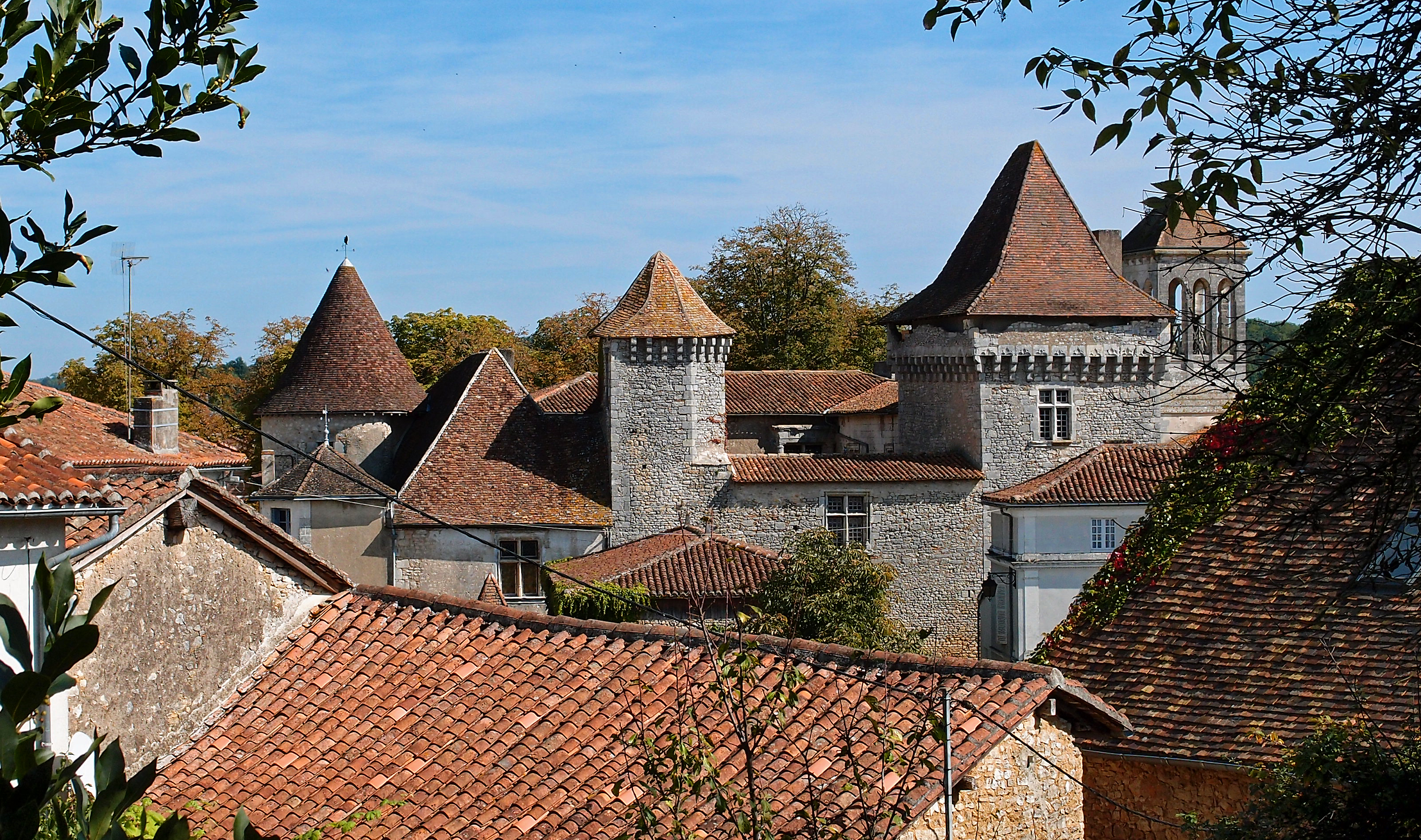
The castle in Varaignes

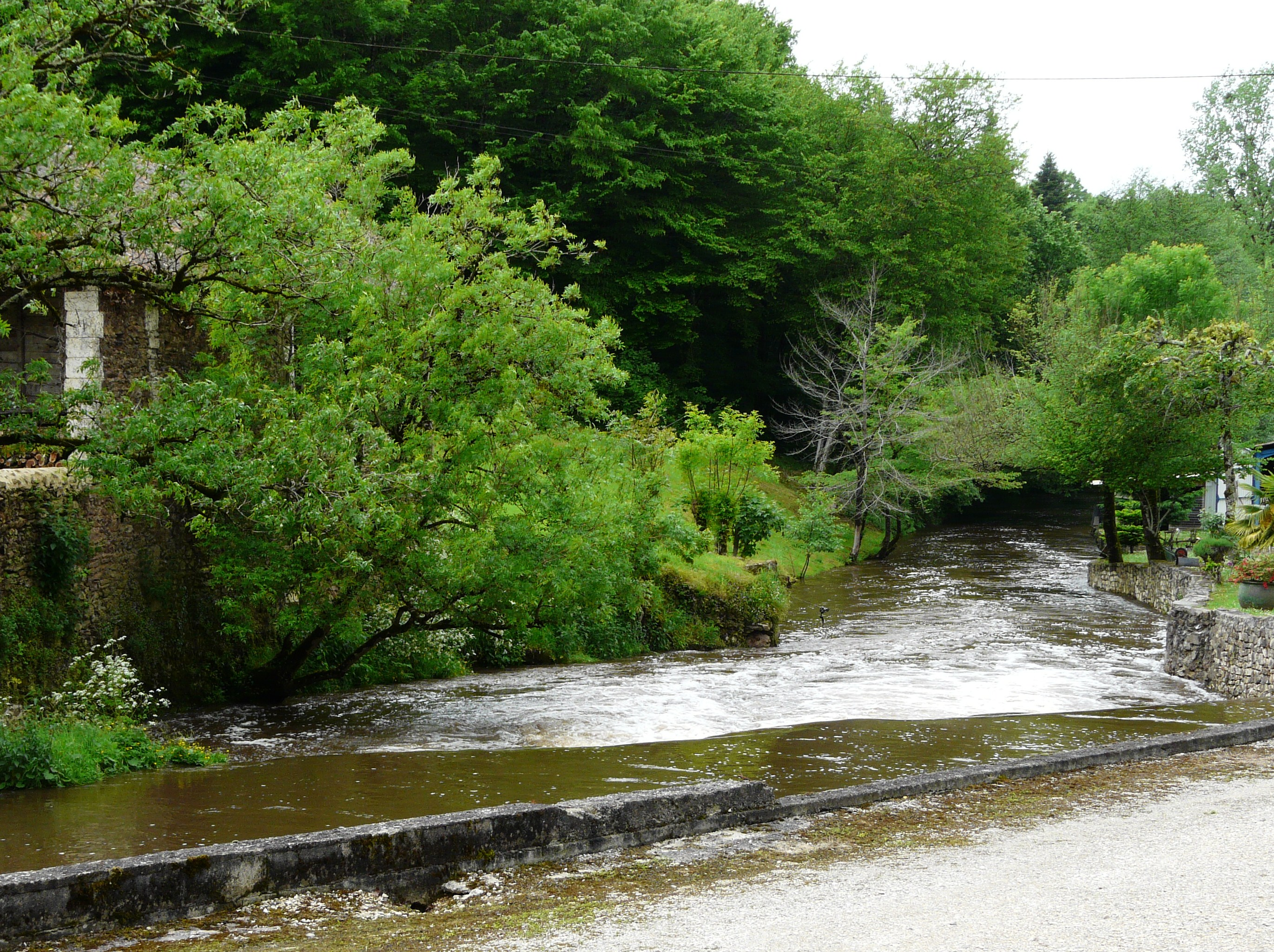
The Bandiat river near Saint-Martial-de-Valette

== See also ==
- Dordogne
- Périgord

== Literature ==
- Bernard Briand; et al., Châlus XIX-32, Carte géologique de la France à 1/50 000. BRGM, Orléans
- J.-P. Floc'h; et al., Nontron XVIII-33 Anticlinaux du Périgord blanc., Carte géologique de la France à 1/50 000 BRGM, Orléans
- P.-L. Guillot; et al., Thiviers XIX-33 Vallée de la Côle., Carte géologique de la France à 1/50 000. BRGM, Orléans
- G. Le Pochat; et al. (1986), Montbron., Carte géologique de la France à 1/50 000. BRGM, Orléans
