= Château de Pommier (Saint-Front-la-Rivière) =

Château in Nouvelle-Aquitaine, France

Coordinates: 45°27′43″N 0°43′36″E

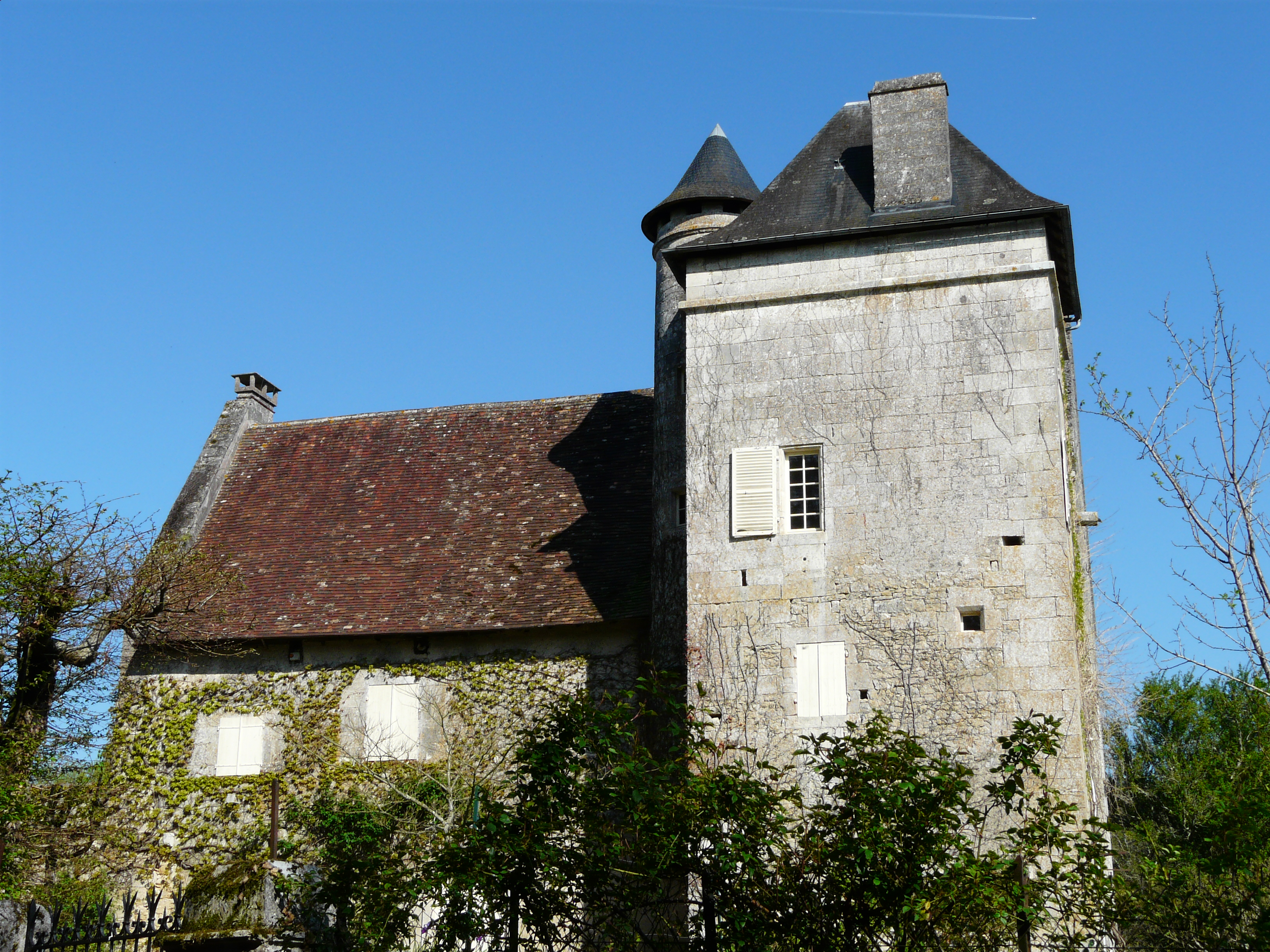
Château de Pommier

The Château de Pommier is a château in Saint-Front-la-Rivière, Dordogne, Nouvelle-Aquitaine, France.
