= Château de Montcigoux =

French fortified castle

Coordinates: 45°36′22″N 1°00′05″E

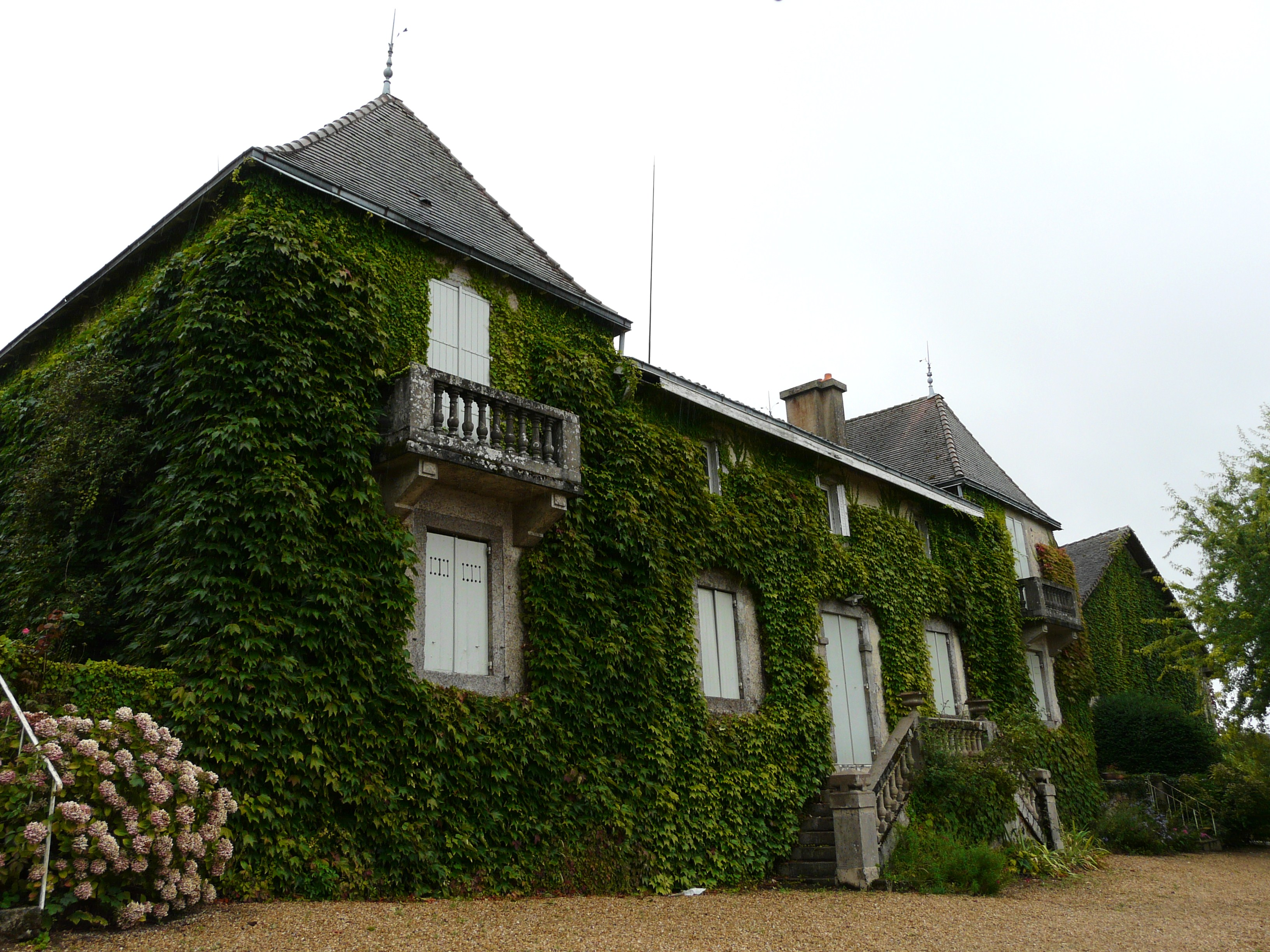
Château de Montcigoux

The Château de Montcigoux is a château in the commune of Saint-Pierre-de-Frugie in Dordogne, France.

A house in the grounds incorporates the remains of a round tower from a 12th-century castle.

== See also ==
- List of castles in France
