= Château de Vieillecour =

French castle

Coordinates: 45°35′17″N 1°01′06″E

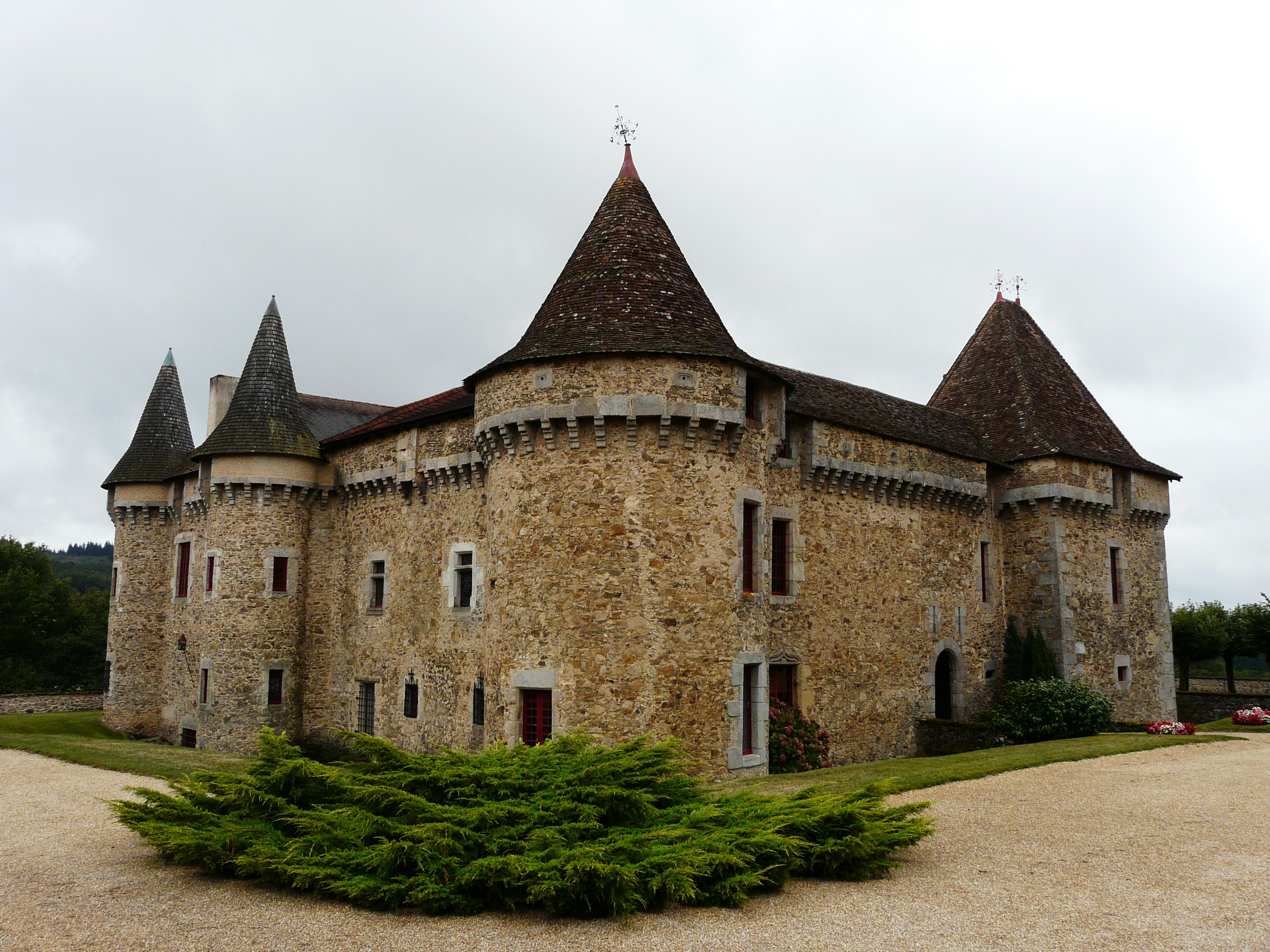
Château de Vieillecour

The Château de Vieillecour is a château in Saint-Pierre-de-Frugie, Dordogne, Nouvelle-Aquitaine, France. It was declared a monument historique in 1946.
