= Château de Frugie =

Château in Nouvelle-Aquitaine, France

Coordinates: 45°34′24″N 0°59′44″E

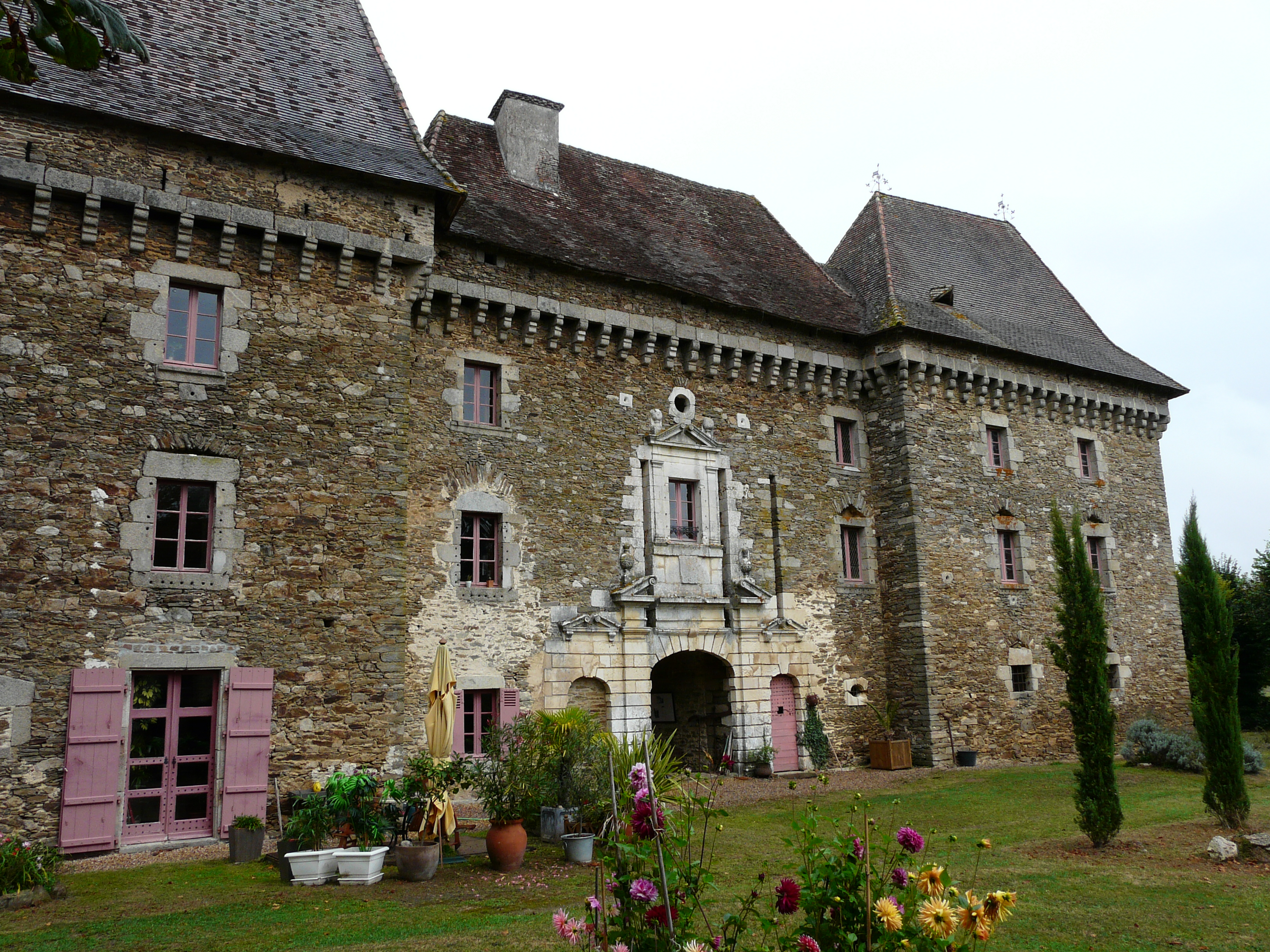
The south-west dwelling of the Frugie Castle

The Château de Frugie is a château in Saint-Pierre-de-Frugie, Dordogne, Nouvelle-Aquitaine, France. The current château was built in the 15th and 16th centuries, replacing an earlier medieval fortified manor that was ravaged during conflicts with the English. The entrance to the south building is decorated with a Louis XIII portal, preceded formerly by a drawbridge removed when the moats were filled in. It was listed as a monument historique on 21 March 1968, for its facades and roofing.

The noble manor of Frugie belonged to the lords of Lambertie from the 12th century, and was one of thirteen places protecting the unstable borders between the Valois and the Plantagenets. In 1585, François de Lambertie sold the château to Jacques Arlot, who rebuilt and enlarged it in 1600 following a fire in 1589 during which the Catholic League seized and burned it. The Arlot family retained ownership for four centuries.
