= Château de la Renaudie (Saint-Front-la-Rivière) =

Château in Nouvelle-Aquitaine, France

Coordinates: 45°26′50″N 0°43′33″E

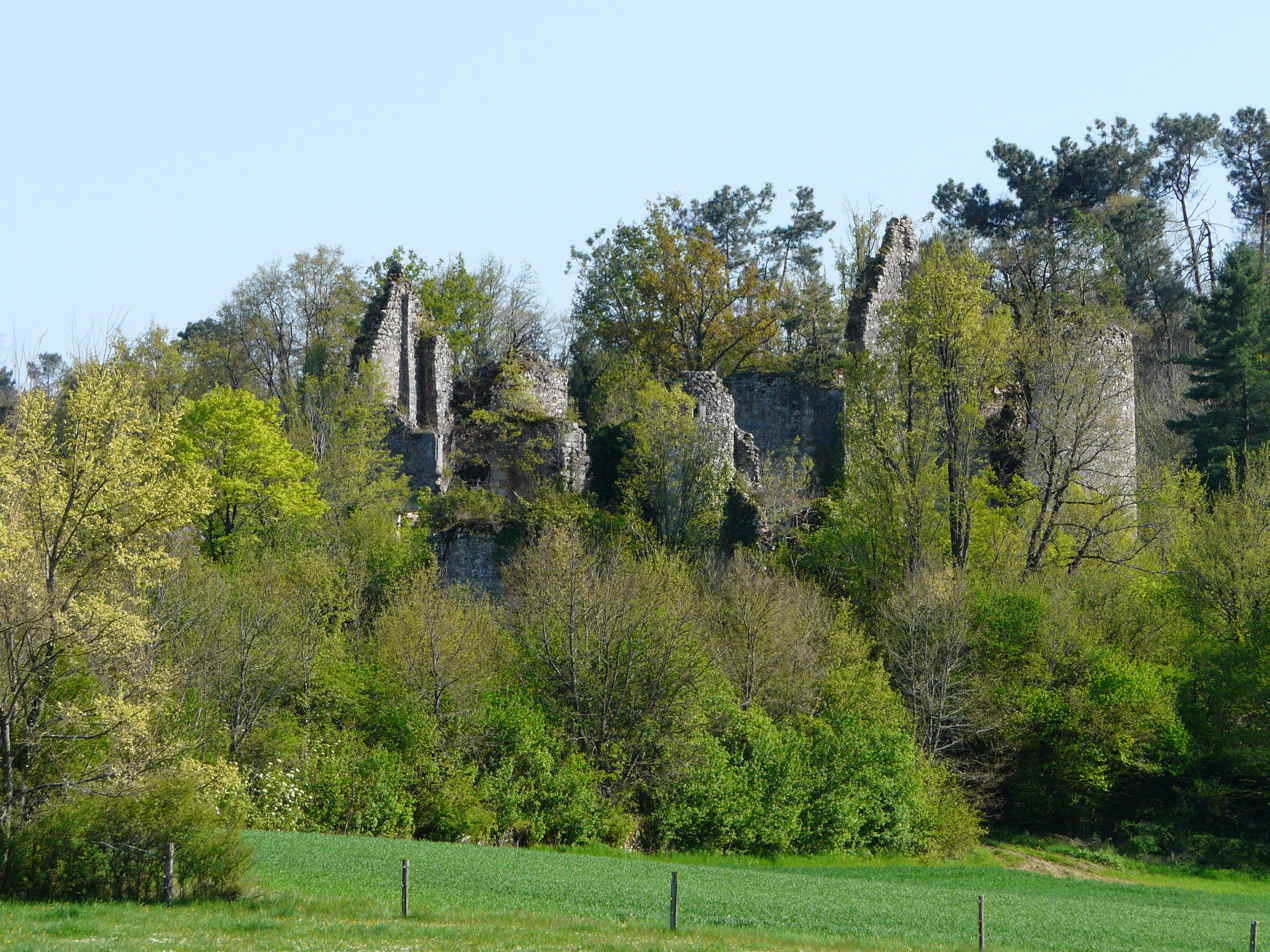

The Château de la Renaudie is a ruined château in Saint-Front-la-Rivière, Dordogne, Nouvelle-Aquitaine, France.
