= Château de Mavaleix =

Château in Chalais, Dordogne, France

Coordinates: 45°30′16″N 0°57′32″E

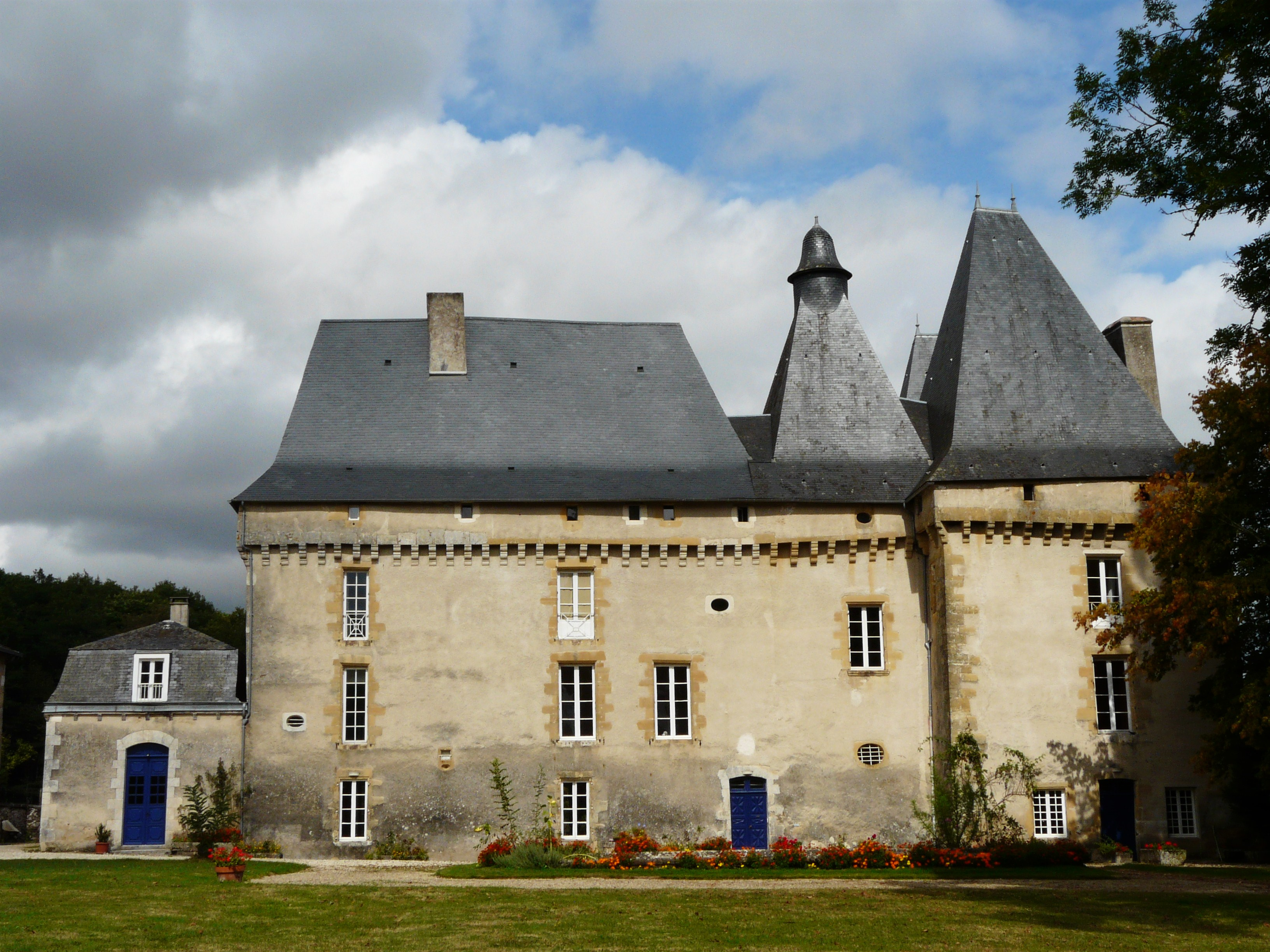
Château de Mavaleix

The Château de Mavaleix is a château, constructed in the 16th century around the remains of an earlier 13th-century castle, in the commune of Chalais, Dordogne, France.

== See also ==
- List of castles in France
