= Saint-Front-la-Rivière =

- Commune
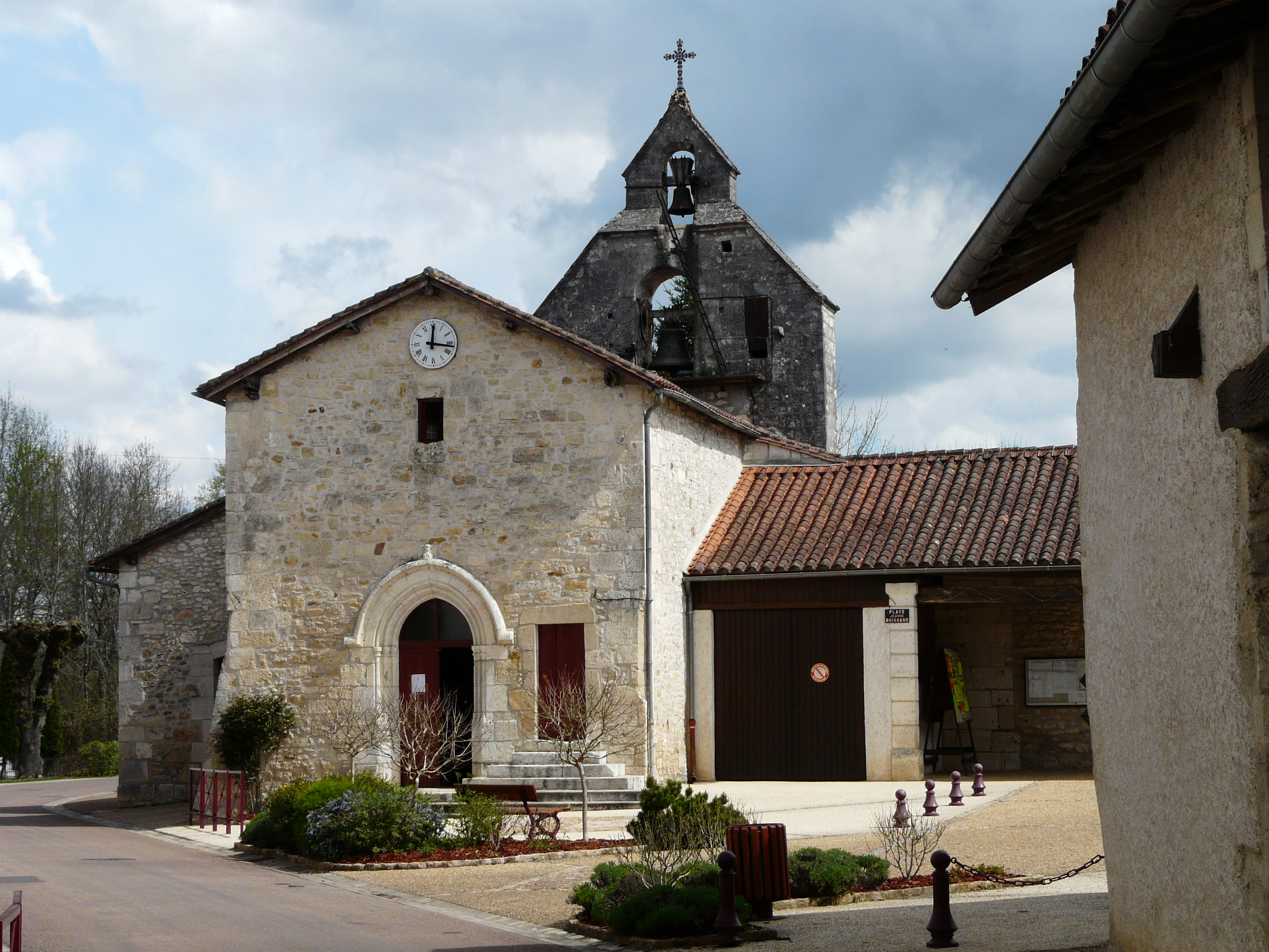
- The church in Saint-Front-la-Rivière
- Location of Saint-Front-la-Rivière
- Location within France Location within Nouvelle-Aquitaine
- Coordinates: 45°28′23″N 0°43′38″E
- Country: France
- Region: Nouvelle-Aquitaine
- Department: Dordogne
- Arrondissement: Nontron
- Canton: Périgord Vert Nontronnais
- Intercommunality: Périgord Nontronnais

Government
  - Mayor (2024–2026): Jean Touchet
- Area^{1}: 17.89 km^{2} (6.91 sq mi)
- Elevation: 132 m (433 ft)
- Highest elevation: 233 m (764 ft)
- Lowest elevation: 125 m (410 ft)
- Population (2023): 511
  - Density: 28.6/km^{2} (74.0/sq mi)
- Time zone: UTC+01:00 (CET)
  - Summer (DST): UTC+02:00 (CEST)
- INSEE/Postal code: 24410 /24300
- ^{1} French Land Register data, which excludes lakes, ponds, glaciers > 1 km^{2} (0.386 sq mi or 247 acres) and river estuaries.

Saint-Front-la-Rivière (French pronunciation: [sɛ̃ fʁɔ̃ la ʁivjɛʁ]; Occitan: Sent Front la Ribiera) is a commune in the Dordogne department in Nouvelle-Aquitaine in southwestern France.

The village center has a twelfth-century church, a bar, school, hairdressers and a post office. It also has four châteaux, dating from between the Middle Ages and the 19th century. These include the ruins of the Du Barry family château, the Château de la Renaudie, which dates from the time of François I. The Du Barrys were implicated in a plot to overthrow the monarch during the Wars of Religion.

Chazelles, one of St Front's surrounding hamlets, was a mint in Gallo-Roman times, before the village came into being.

La Varenne, another of St Front's hamlets, means 'game reserve'. Wild deer are often seen in the surrounding farmland.

== Population ==
Historical population
Year	Pop.	±% p.a.
1968	570	—
1975	586	+0.40%
1982	541	−1.13%
1990	559	+0.41%
1999	543	−0.32%
2007	532	−0.26%
2012	519	−0.49%
2017	518	−0.04%
2023	511	−0.23%
Source: INSEE

== Economy ==
In the 19th century St Front had a good reputation for the quality of its wine. There remain a few private but no commercial vineyards. An important contributor to the village's growth was the steam tram linking Saint Front to Périgueux, the administrative capital of the Dordogne, to Brantôme and the railway at Saint-Pardoux-la-Rivière. Agriculture has always played an important role in the area. More recently, St Front was the manufacturing headquarters of an important picture frame manufacturer. The factory, which was the last big local employer, closed at the start of this century. There are several small businesses and artisans, including a forge and a luxury cattery, La Crème de la Crème, just for cats. One of the biggest contributions to the village economy is tourism, with self-catering gîtes in several of the hamlets welcoming visitors from all over the world.

== Saint-Front-la-Rivière today ==
Saint Front is a typical small French country village, with a mixture of older, renovated and new properties. The majority of the small population were born in the village, and new residents are a mixture of locals and incomers from the Périgord, and also British and Dutch. Village social life is driven by the bar, Le Relais de la Dronne 2ème Génèration, a few associations (charities) and the comité des fêtes. Each year there is a Loto day, Boules competition, a flea market with children's funfair, farmers' markets and a cycle race "Les Boucles de la Dronne". Guests in 2009 include veteran Tour de France champions and the race attracts many cycling pros.

== See also ==
- Communes of the Dordogne department
