= Saint-Pierre-de-Frugie =

- Commune
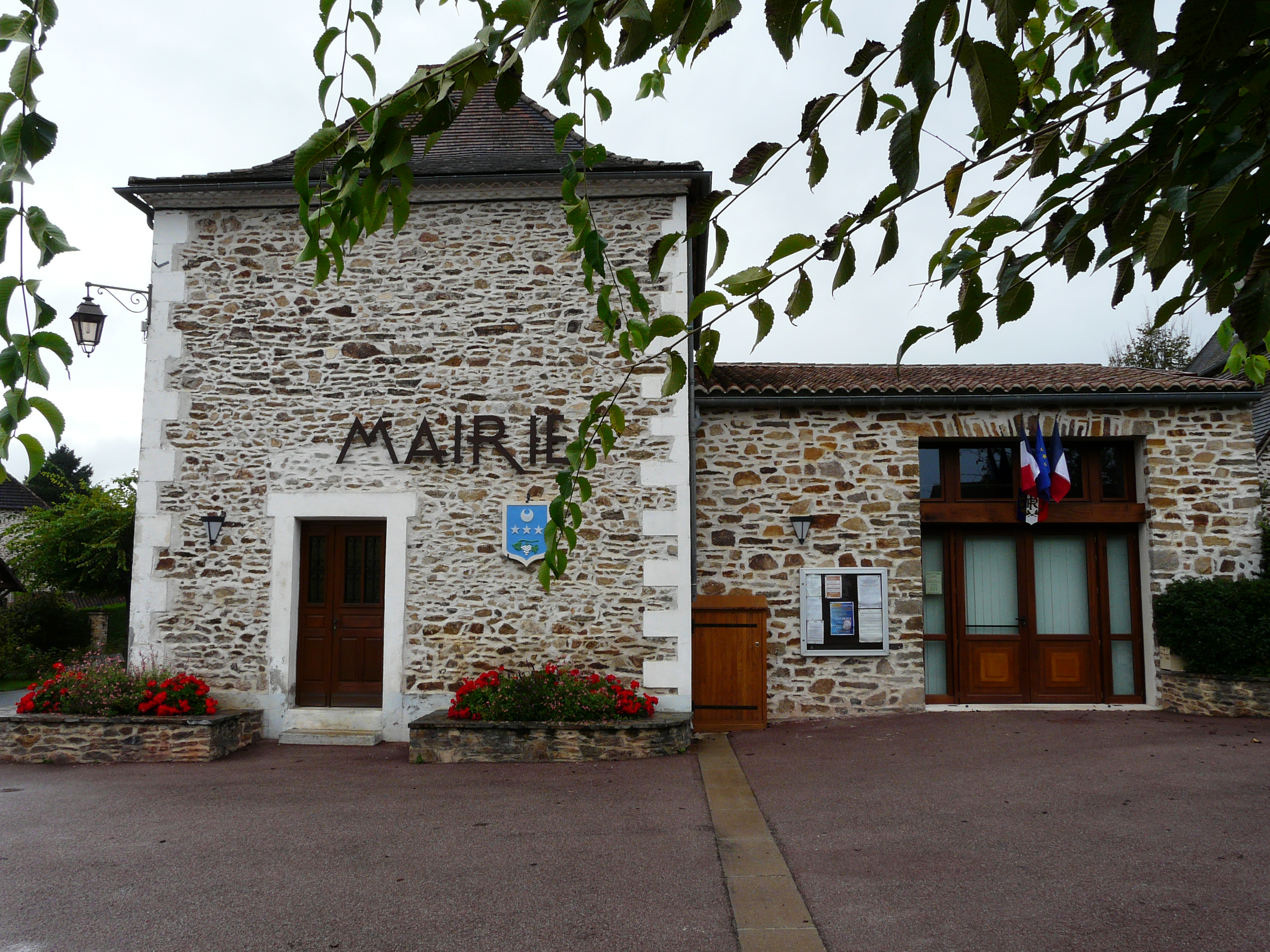
- The town hall in Saint-Pierre-de-Frugie

- Coat of arms
- Location of Saint-Pierre-de-Frugie
- Location within France Location within Nouvelle-Aquitaine
- Coordinates: 45°34′27″N 0°59′59″E
- Country: France
- Region: Nouvelle-Aquitaine
- Department: Dordogne
- Arrondissement: Nontron
- Canton: Thiviers

Government
  - Mayor (2024–2026): Stéphane Fayol
- Area^{1}: 21.74 km^{2} (8.39 sq mi)
- Elevation: 318 m (1,043 ft)
- Highest elevation: 491 m (1,611 ft)
- Lowest elevation: 305 m (1,001 ft)
- Population (2023): 520
  - Density: 24/km^{2} (62/sq mi)
- Time zone: UTC+01:00 (CET)
  - Summer (DST): UTC+02:00 (CEST)
- INSEE/Postal code: 24486 /24450
- ^{1} French Land Register data, which excludes lakes, ponds, glaciers > 1 km^{2} (0.386 sq mi or 247 acres) and river estuaries.

Saint-Pierre-de-Frugie (French pronunciation: [sɛ̃ pjɛʁ də fʁyʒi]; Occitan: Sent Peir de Frègia) is a commune in the Dordogne department in Nouvelle-Aquitaine in southwestern France.

The village is dependent on tourism. The heart of the town contains a central office, staffed only part-time, a single restaurant ('L'Escargot'), and one hotel.

== Geography ==
Saint-Pierre-de-Frugie is situated among rolling hills. The characteristic farm-land is rich in history of this particular region. Many of the farms have been abandoned, and have no crop yield, but are maintained by the people as fields. These fields are still private property, and much of the area is off limits to tourists, but roads often run in between the farms, and one can see the expansiveness of the unused landscape.

== Population ==
Historical population
Year	Pop.	±% p.a.
1968	584	—
1975	516	−1.75%
1982	487	−0.82%
1990	413	−2.04%
1999	373	−1.13%
2007	407	+1.10%
2012	383	−1.21%
2017	398	+0.77%
2023	520	+4.56%
Source: INSEE

== See also ==
- Communes of the Dordogne department
