= Parc naturel régional Périgord Limousin =

Natural park of France

Coordinates: 45.5567°N 1.00389°E

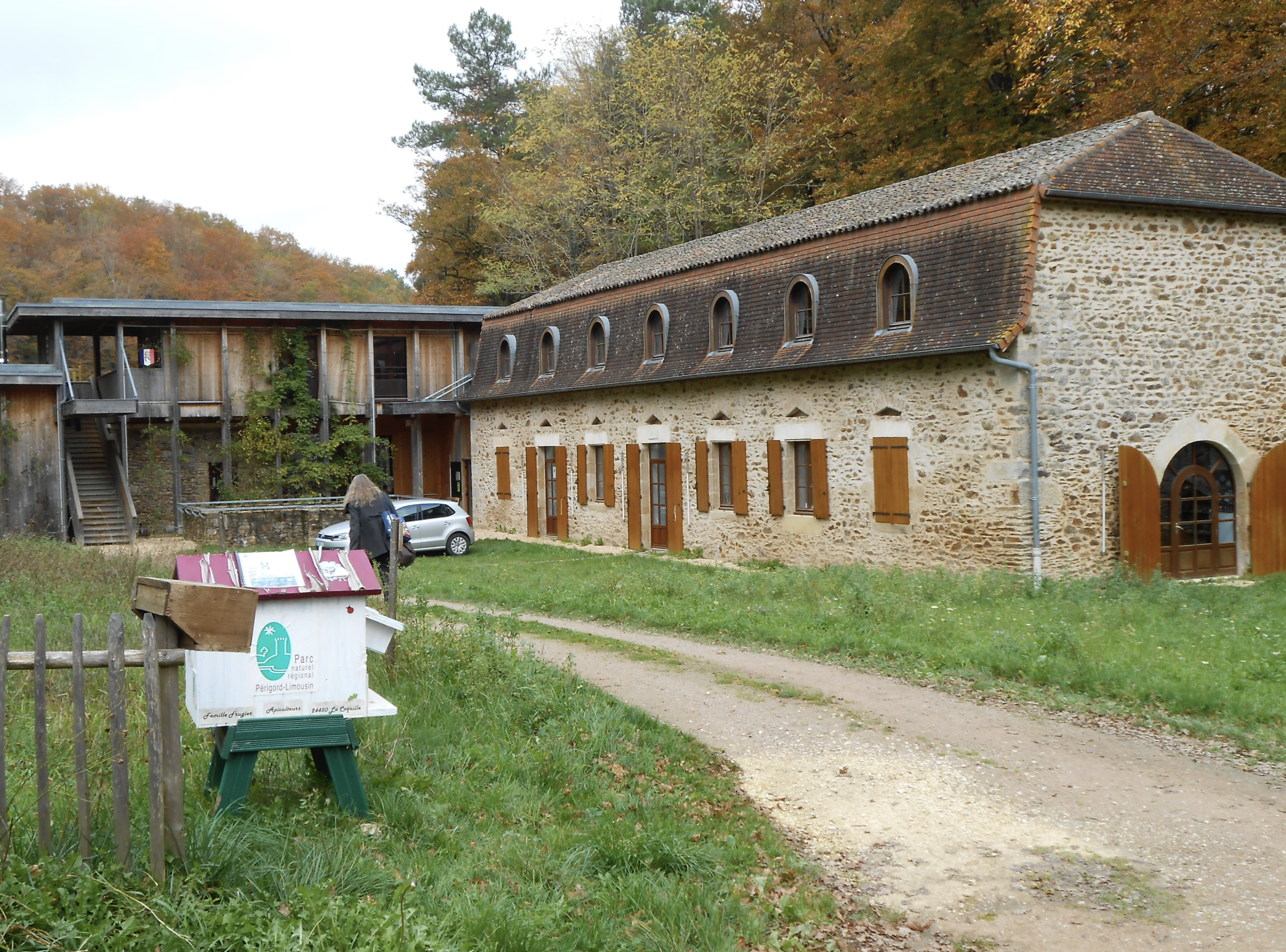
Parc naturel régional Périgord Limousin

The Parc naturel régional Périgord Limousin (French pronunciation: [paʁk natyʁɛl ʁeʒjɔnal peʁiɡɔʁ limuzɛ̃], "Périgord Limousin Regional Natural Park") was created March 9, 1998. It consists of 78 communes situated in the Dordogne and Haute Vienne départements. The park has a surface area of 1,800 square kilometers and is inhabited by 49,661 people.

== Geography ==
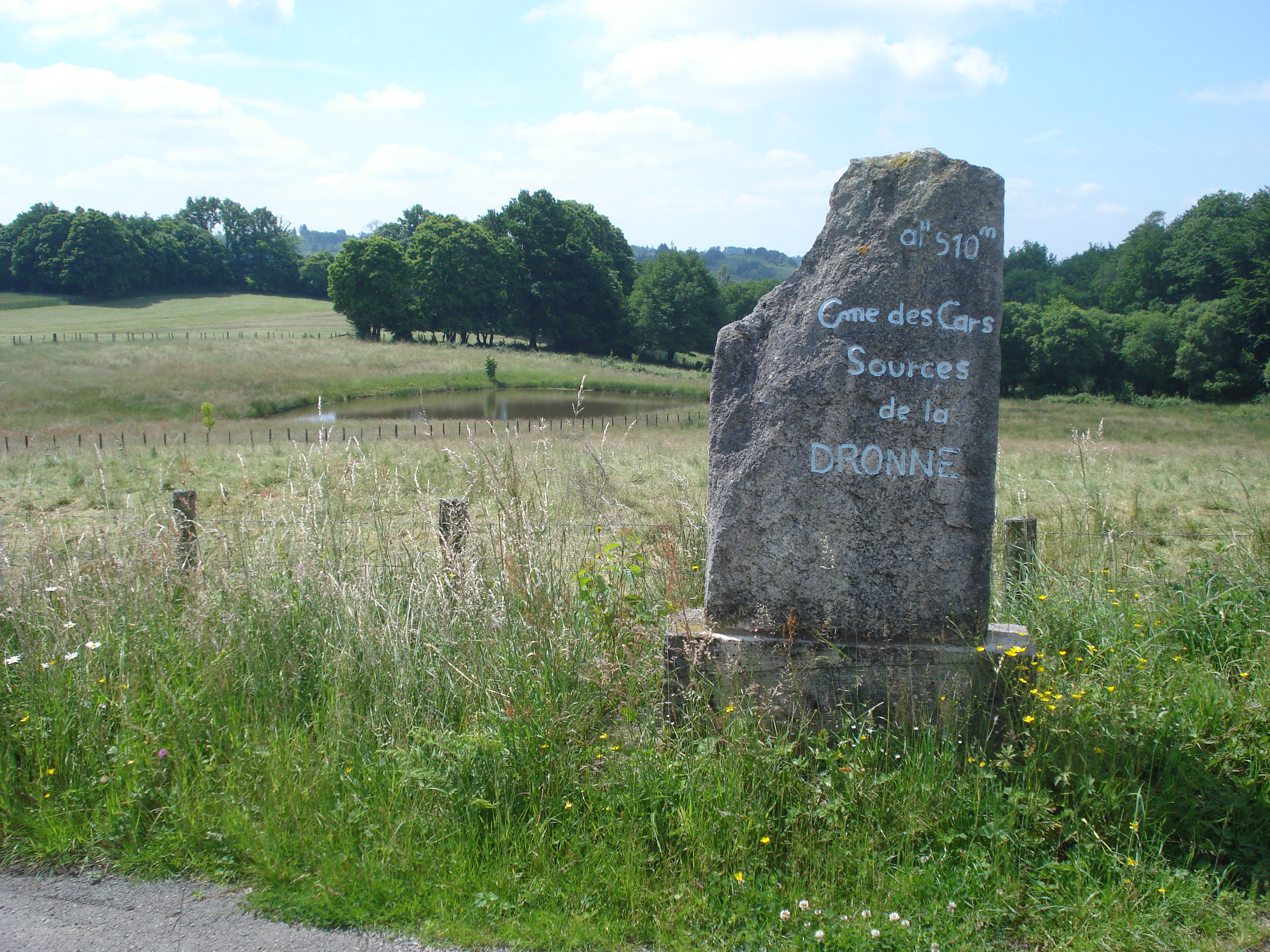
The source of the Dronne in the granitic massif of Nexon-Les Cars, eastern highlands

The park comprises 5 cantons in the Dordogne:

- Bussière-Badil
- Jumilhac-le-Grand
- Mareuil
- Nontron
- Saint-Pardoux-la-Rivière

and 5 cantons in the Haute-Vienne:

- Châlus
- Oradour-sur-Vayres
- Rochechouart
- Saint-Laurent-sur-Gorre
- Saint-Mathieu

Associated with the 78 founding communes are six other communes, that serve as access points to the park:

- Aixe-sur-Vienne
- Brantôme
- Nexon
- Saint-Junien
- Saint-Yrieix-la-Perche
- Thiviers

The two artificial lakes Lac de Lavaud and Lac de Mas Chaban belong to the Charente département, but they are also associated with the park.

The park administration is housed in an ancient smithy in the hamlet of La Barde (commune of La Coquille), whereas the visitor center is established in Pageas.

=== Landscapes ===
Elevations in the park start at 85 meters along the Nizonne river near La Rochebeaucourt-et-Argentine and reach 556 meters near Courbefy southeast of Bussière-Galant. Due to these differences in elevation the park possesses several different natural habitats like moors near Champagnac-la-Rivière, bocage, meadows near water courses and forests consisting of chestnut and oak. South of Mareuil one encounters heathland and dry grassland. There are also many little pools and lakes. Many brooks and smaller rivers like for example the Arthonnet, the Bandiat, the Charente, the Côle, the Dronne, the Gorre, the Grêne, the Nizonne and the Tardoire drain the parkland. Of all these water courses the Isle is the only river that has its source outside the park's perimeter.

The water courses belong to one of the three drainage basins:

- the Dordogne in the south of the park
- the Vienne in the north and
- the Charente in the northwest.

=== Climate ===
The climate in the park is temperate, but can show quite pronounced local variations. In the northeast the climate is generally continental, whereas in the southwest it is maritime. Certain protected south-facing slopes can even possess a submediterranean climate. The following climatic diagram shows data averaged over the last five years (2004–2008) from a private weather station (354 meters above sea level) near Milhaguet in the Haute Vienne.

Temperature distribution in °C:

The average temperature over the last five years was 11.1 °C, the yearly precipitation was 1053.6 millimeters. The last years have been exceptionally wet.

== Geology ==
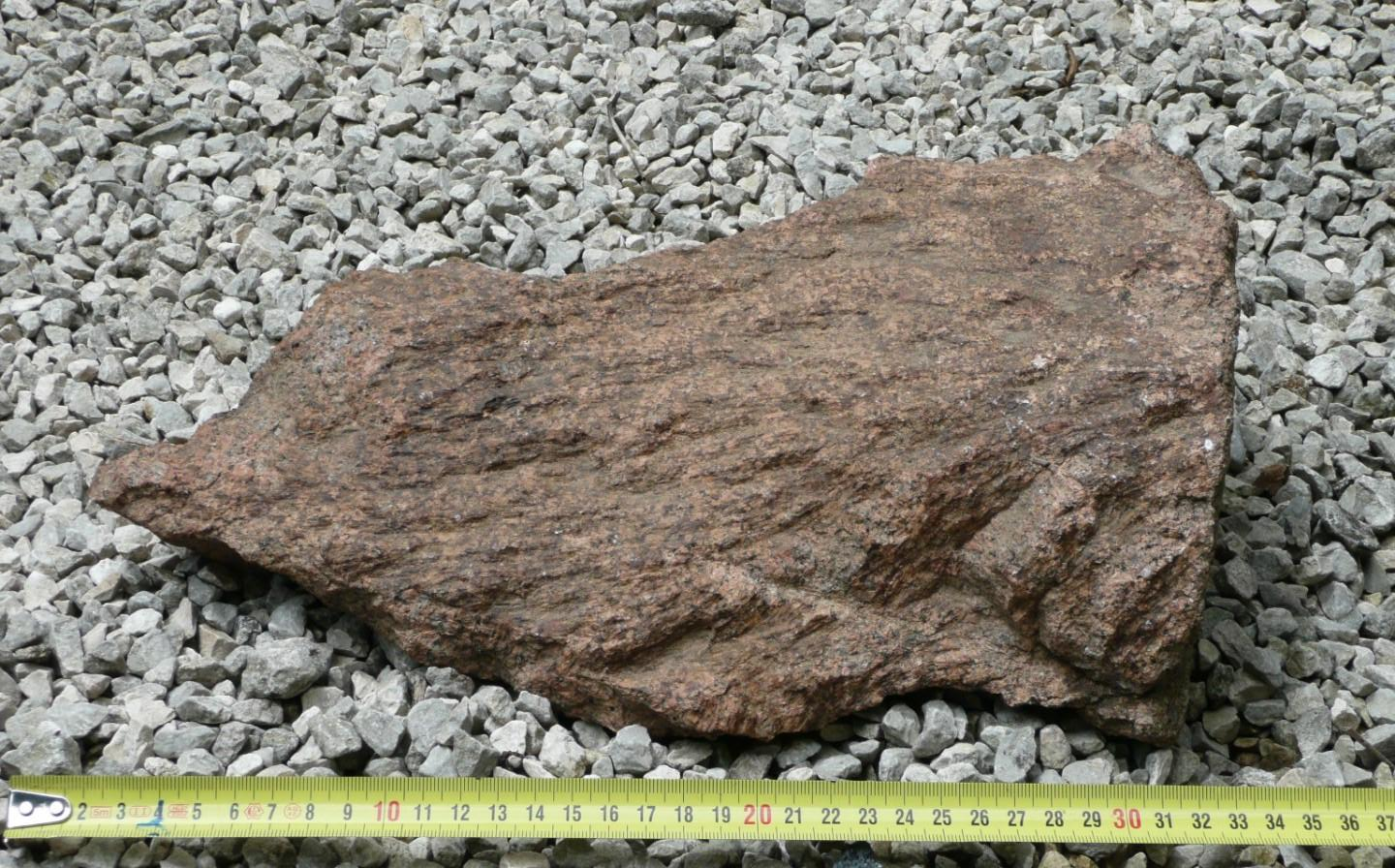
Shatter cone from the Rochechouart impact structure

Geologically the park belongs to two very different terranes: the major part northeast of a line Varaignes - Nontron - Saint-Pardoux-la-Rivière - Thiviers consists of Variscan basement rocks of the northwestern Massif Central. The much smaller southwestern part is made up of Mesozoic and Cenozoic sedimentary rocks belonging to the Aquitanian Basin. The boundary between the two terrains is outlined by important faults in most places. The downthrown sedimentary block has in general much lower elevations. The basement block has been uplifted fairly recently as shown by the rejuvenation of streams.

The basement rocks are mainly gneisses, mica schists and granitoids with occasional outcrops of amphibolites and serpentinites. The sedimentary succession of the Aquitanian Basin starts with a transgression in the Lower Jurassic (Lias) over the basement rocks (usually a conglomerate at the base, followed by arkoses, dolomites and shales). During the Dogger a calcareous reef built from ooids developed. During the Malm dense, micritic limestones were deposited. Afterwards the sea retreated to come back again at the onset of the Cenomanian (Upper Cretaceous). A very warm epicontinental sea chalky sediments were laid down right up to the Maastrichtian. At the end of the Cretaceous the sea finally retreated and the sediments of the Aquitanian Basin started to become continental within the area of the park.

During the Alpine and the Pyrenean orogeny (Eocene and Oligocene) the basement of the Massif Central was uplifted and rejuvenated. As a consequence massive alluvial deposits (mainly conglomerates and sandstones) were built out as long tongues onto the lowlands, some reaching almost 50 kilometers in length. Due to the various ice ages, erosion has again increased since the Pleistocene − a good example for this being the Dronne. Since the start of the Pleistocene the river has lowered its bed downstream of Brantôme by almost 100 meters.

A geological specialty of the park is the Rochechouart impact structure, the remnants of an asteroid impact at the end of the Upper Triassic (roughly 200 million years ago). The impact created a crater with a diameter of 21 kilometers and destroyed every form of life within a radius of several hundred kilometers. There is no trace of the original crater left, the only indicators for its existence are ejecta blankets (breccias and suevites), shatter cones and thrust faults.

=== Minerals in the park ===
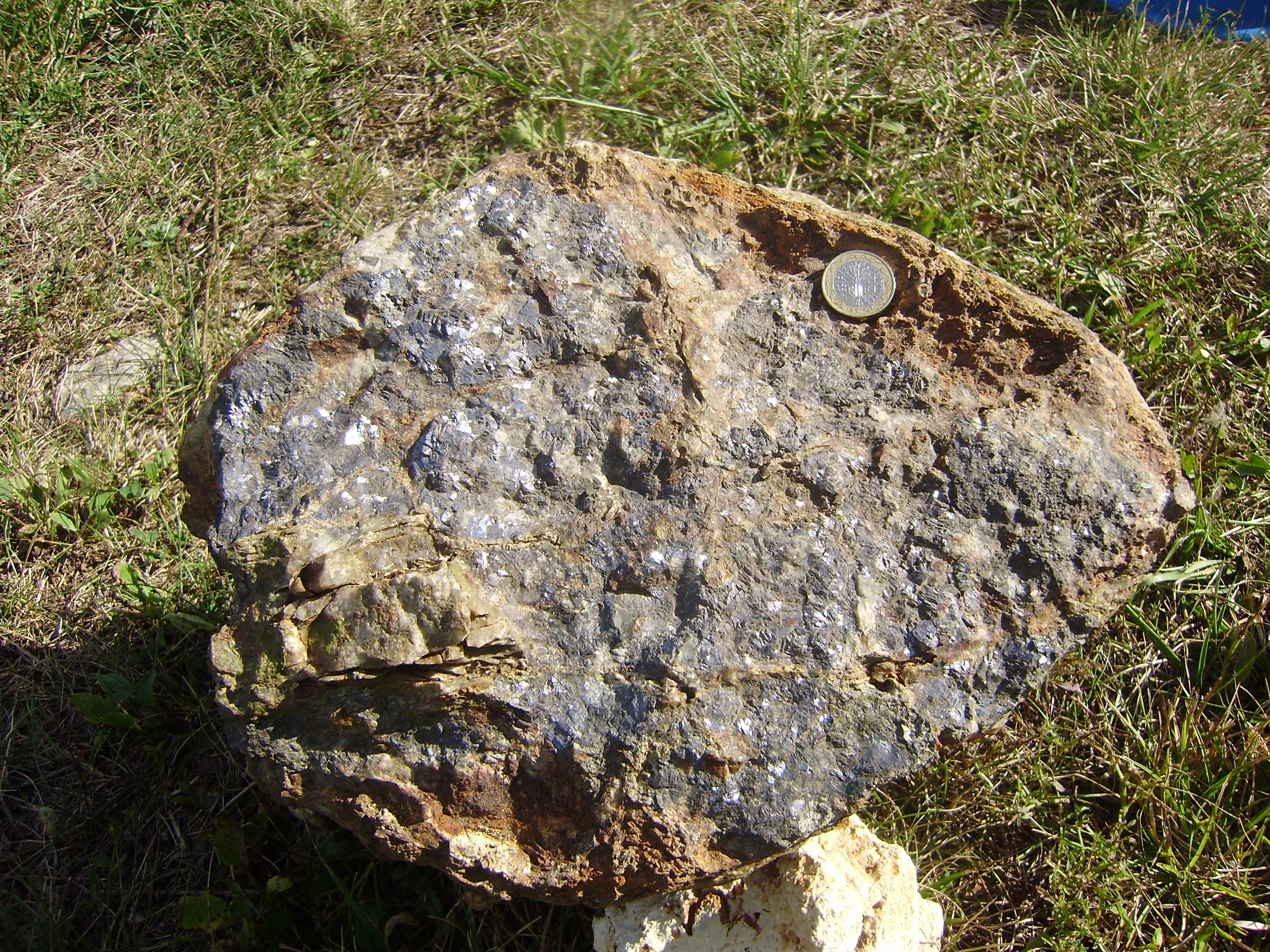
Massive galena coating - quartz vein from the fine-grained hornblende-bearing Piégut-Pluviers Granodiorites Mine du Cantonnier, southeast of Nontron.

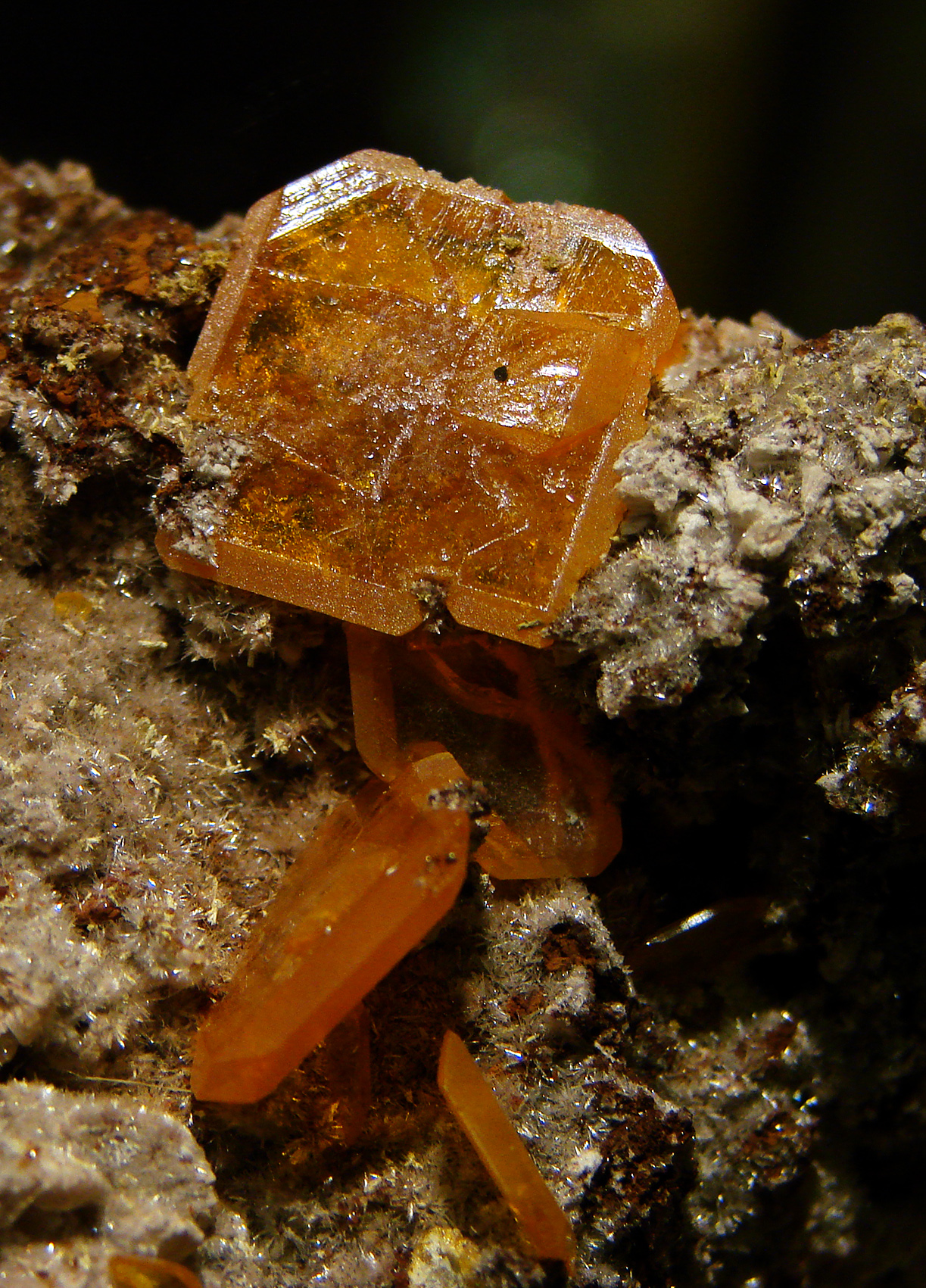
Wulfenite

Besides the common minerals quartz, alkali feldspar, plagioclase, biotite, muscovite as well as calcite, dolomite and gypsum rarer minerals occur, for example actinolite, allanite, andalusite, antigorite, apatite, arsenopyrite, baryte, cassiterite, chalcedony, chalcopyrite, chlorite, chromite, clinopyroxene, chrysotile, cordierite, cyanite, epidote, galena, garnet, goethite, graphite, hematite, hornblende, ilmenite, kaolinite, limonite, magnetite, manganite, marcasite, montmorillonite, prehnite, psilomelane, pyrite, pyrolusite, pyrrhotite, rutile, sillimanite, sphalerite, sphene, staurolite, tourmaline and zircon. Some very rare minerals do exist as well, like anglesite, autunite, beryl, cerussite, covellite, crocoite, greenockite, nontronite, pyromorphite, scheelite, native silver, stibnite and wulfenite, and also extremely rare minerals like chalcolite, dundasite, embreyite, hisingerite, leadhillite, mimetite, ozokerite (pseudo-mineral) and vauquelinite.

=== Resources ===
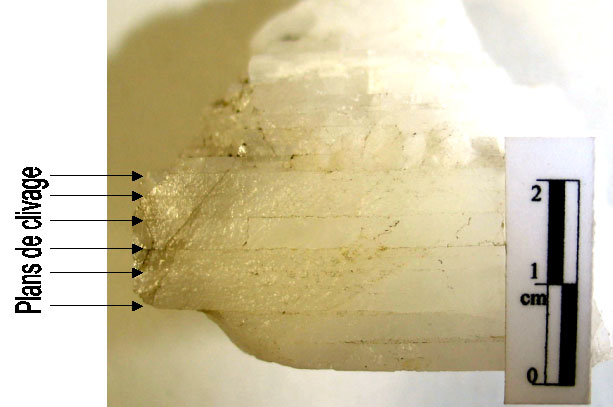
Ultrapure quartz from Saint-Paul-la-Roche

In the Piégut-Pluviers Granodiorite existed a quarry near Lacaujamet (commune of Saint-Estèphe, not far from Piégut-Pluviers) that once extracted granodiorite lintels for doors and windows. The Toarcian clays were exploited by numerous small tile factories. The relatively soft Cretaceous limestones (especially the Turonian) were mined in hundreds of small quarries, because they were a much appreciated building stone. All these activities have now almost come to a halt in the park. There are a few quarries still in operation, but they produce mainly gravel for roadworks or limestone flour for agricultural purposes.

Many small pockets of pegmatites used to be exploited locally as a resource for the porcelain industry.

A curiosity was an ultrapure quartz lens found near Saint-Paul-la-Roche with parallel C-surfaces belonging to a C/S fabric. Originally this fabric was attributed to the Rochechouart impact structure, but later on its purely tectonic character was confirmed. Meanwhile, the outcrop has been completely exploited due to requests by the computer industry and NASA.

In the last two centuries lodes containing lead, zinc and silver were mined near Nontron and Saint-Pardoux-la-Rivière. Iron used to be exploited in the Sidèrolithique - small iron-rich Tertiary deposits. At the base of these iron deposits are manganese-rich layers in karstic depressions and infills. They formed the basis for manganese mining activities that have ceased in the last century.

The following metals are known to exist, but have never been mined:

- antimony − in pyrite near Bussière-Galant
- copper − in chalcopyrite and in covellite near Saint-Pierre-de-Frugie
- gold − in arsenopyrite near Bussière-Galant
- tin − in cassiterite near Cussac
- tungsten − in scheelite near Montibus, commune of Mialet
- uranium − in autunite and in chalcolite, commune of Champs-Romain.

== Flora and funga ==
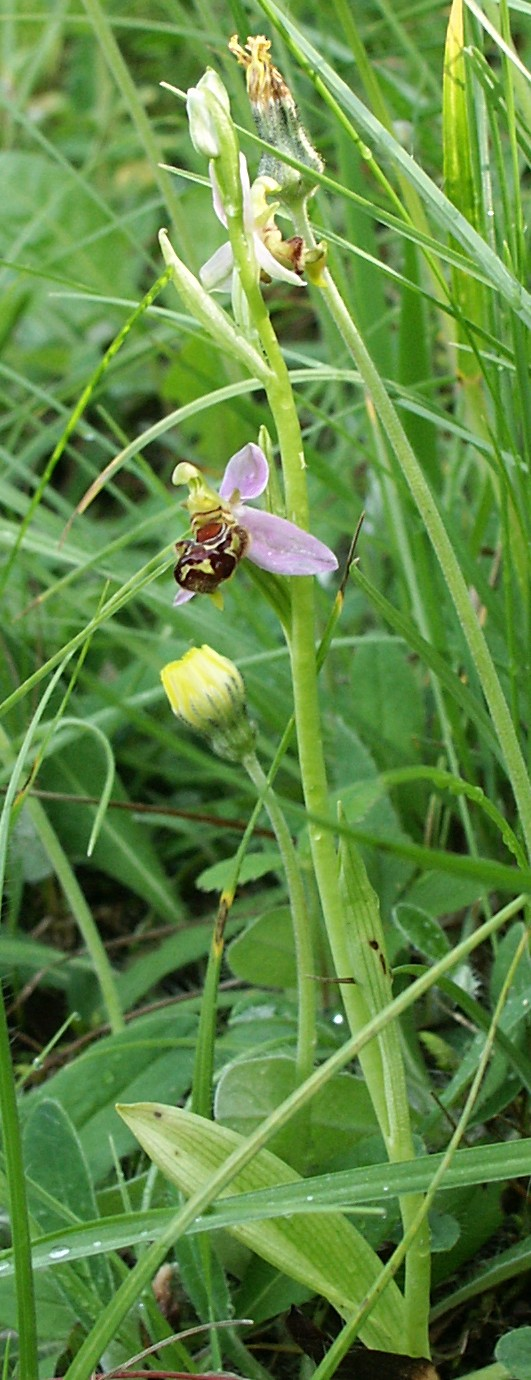
Bee orchid, one of the more than 25 species of orchids found in the Park

The park harbours many different biotopes and therefore possesses a very varied flora. Remarkable are the orchids with 25 different known species. Amongst the orchids one finds species like Anacamptis coriophora, bee orchid, Dactylorhiza maculata, fly orchid, frog orchid and pyramidal orchid. Besides the orchids grow chelidonium, common bluebell, cornflower, the carnivorous Drosera rotundifolia, equisetum, Gentiana pneumonanthe, geum, honeysuckle, mentha, Papaver rhoeas, Polygonatum multiflorum and Verbascum thapsus.

Mushrooms are quite common as well with taxa like agaricus, boletus, craterellus and truffles.

Amongst shrubs and trees thrive Fraxinus excelsior, hazel, malus, Mespilus germanica, oak, Prunus spinosa, Robinia pseudoacacia, sambucus, sweet chestnut and walnut.

== Fauna ==
In the park live over 40 different species of mammals, amongst them beech marten, common genet, European badger, European pine marten, European mink, European otter, fox, garden dormouse, hedgehog, red deer, red squirrel, roe deer and wild boar.

Bats comprise on their own 12 different species, amongst them barbastelle, greater horseshoe bat, lesser horseshoe bat, pipistrellus, plecotus and whiskered bat.

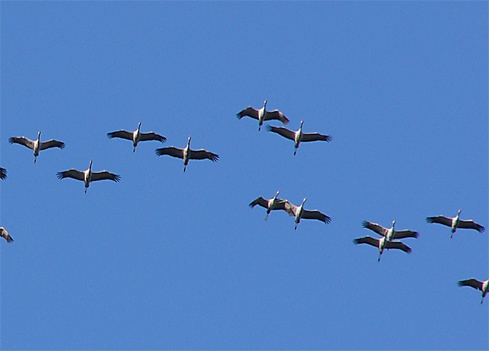
Migrating cranes

The birds are represented by 110 species, for example barn owl, black kite, black redstart, black woodpecker, common buzzard, common cuckoo, common kestrel, common kingfisher, common moorhen, European nightjar, European robin, great spotted woodpecker, grey partridge, hen harrier, honey buzzard, hoopoe, jackdaw, little owl, nightingale, shrike and swallow.

Amongst the reptiles 12 species have their habitat in the park, e.g., grass snake, Vipera aspis, wall lizard and western green lizard.

Amphibians comprise also 12 species like for example agile frog, common frog, common toad, European tree frog, fire salamander and marbled newt.

Amongst the fishes there are brown trout, common minnow, European brook lamprey and European bullhead.

Also many different invertebrates are present, amongst them Austropotamobius pallipes, freshwater pearl mussel and insects like Caelifera, crickets, Geotrupidae, Lucanus cervus, Lepidoptera and Odonata.

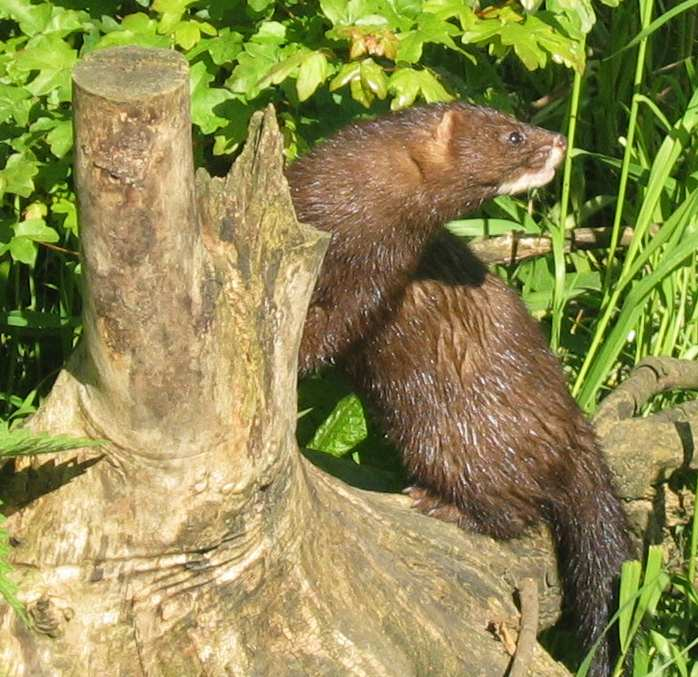
European mink

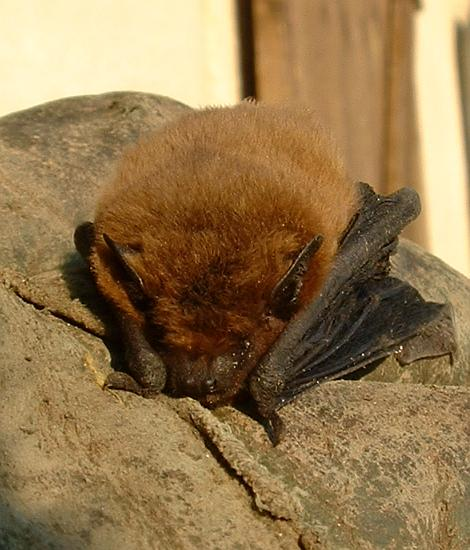
Pipistrellus

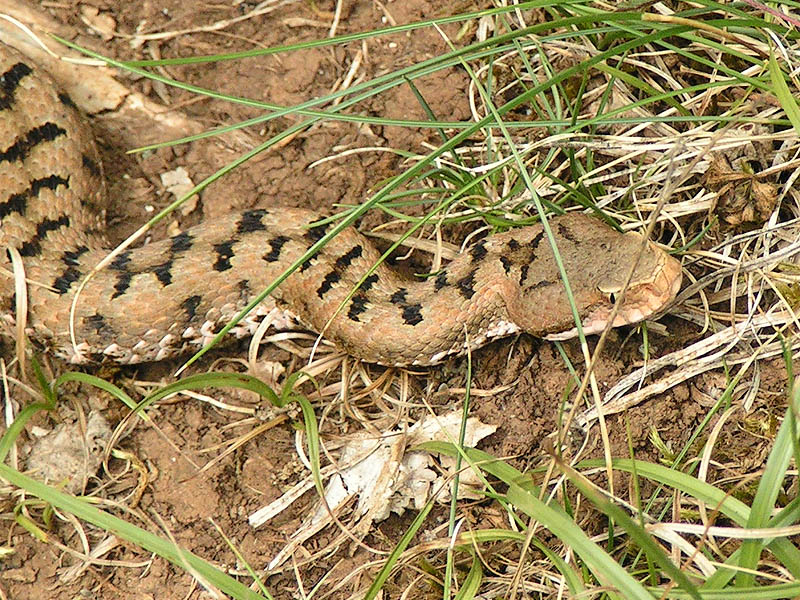
Vipera aspis

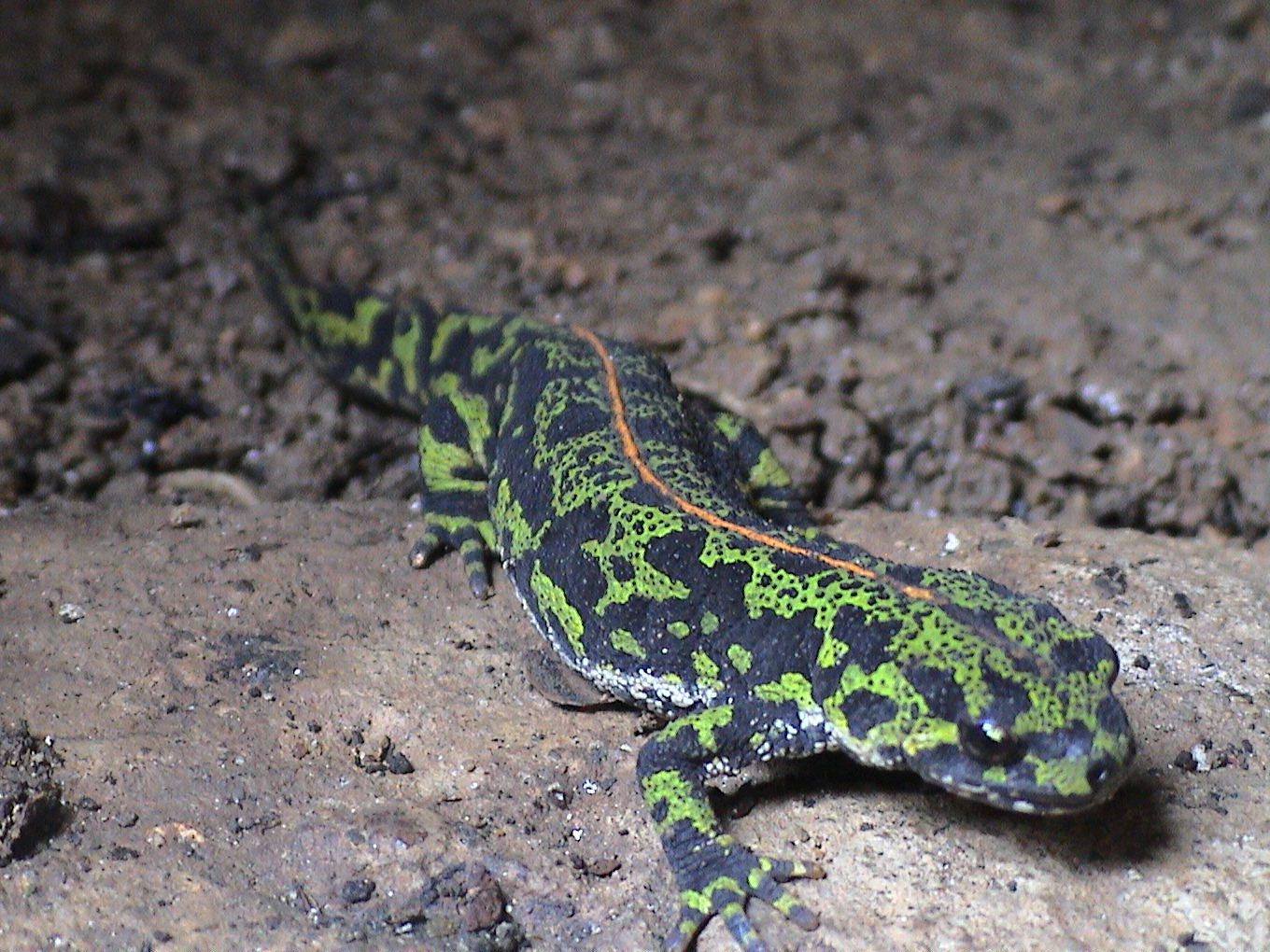
Marbled newt

== Prehistory ==
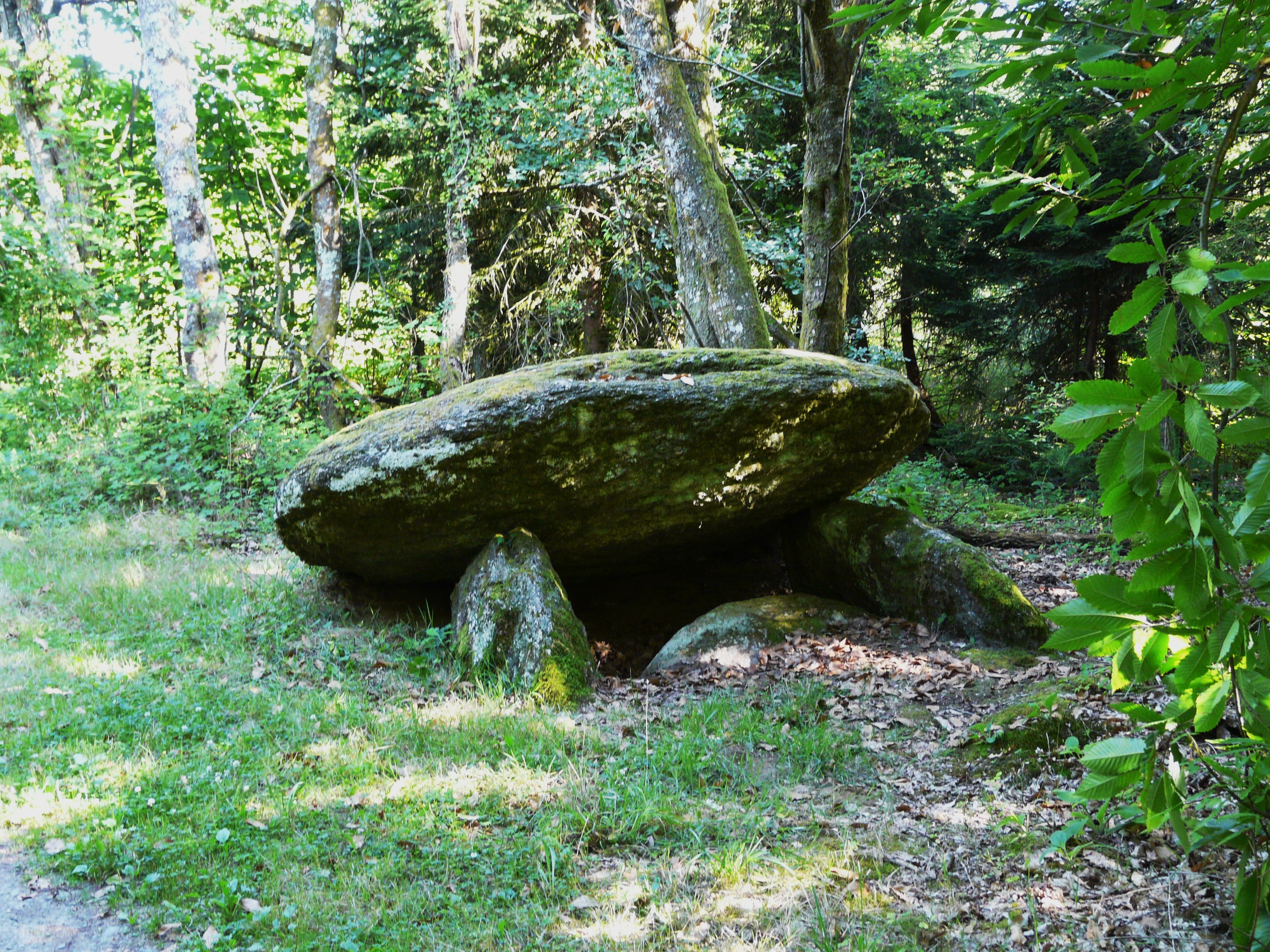
Dolmen near La Jalinie, commune of Saint-Jory-de-Chalais

The park's area has been inhabited by humans (Homo heidelbergensis and Homo neanderthalensis) since the Lower Paleolithic. More than 1200 stone tool remnants found near Vayres document the presence of humans from 300 000 years BP onwards (Acheulean) into the Neolithic. The numerous findings (well over 3000 pieces) near Montoume (commune of Chéronnac) cover Middle Paleolithic, Upper Paleolithic, Mesolithic and Neolithic.

=== Dwellings ===
Rock shelters, grottoes and caves in the valley of the Bandiat, the Dronne, the Nizonne, the Tardoire and the Trincou have been occupied since the Mousterian up into the Magdalenian. Examples are:

- Brouillaud near La Tour-Blanche − Mousterian and Aurignacian
- Font Bargeix near La Chapelle-Montmoreau − Magdalenian
- Fronsac near Vieux-Mareuil − Magdalenian
- La Jovelle near La Tour-Blanche - engravings of a capricorn and a mammoth - Périgordian?
- La Peyzie near La Tour-Blanche - Magdalenian and Azilian
- La Tabaterie near La Gonterie-Boulouneix - paleolithic rock shelter, slightly outside of the park
- Puyrignac near Champeaux-et-la-Chapelle-Pommier
- Rebières near Brantôme - several rock shelters and caves, somewhat outside of the park
- Sandougne near La Gonterie-Boulouneix - Mousterian
- Villars - 30 engravings and cave paintings (blue horse, capricorns, hunter attacked by a bison) - early Magdalenian (17000 – 15000 years BP)
- Teyjat - engravings of bisons, red deer, horses and reindeer - late Magdalenian (~ 10000 years BP)

The neolithic open-air sites Montoume and Nouaillas near Vayres document the gradual changeover from hunter-gatherers to a more agrarian/sessile lifestyle. Finds include stone axes, arrow heads, scrapers and whetstones made from quartz or metamorphic schists.

=== Megalith culture ===
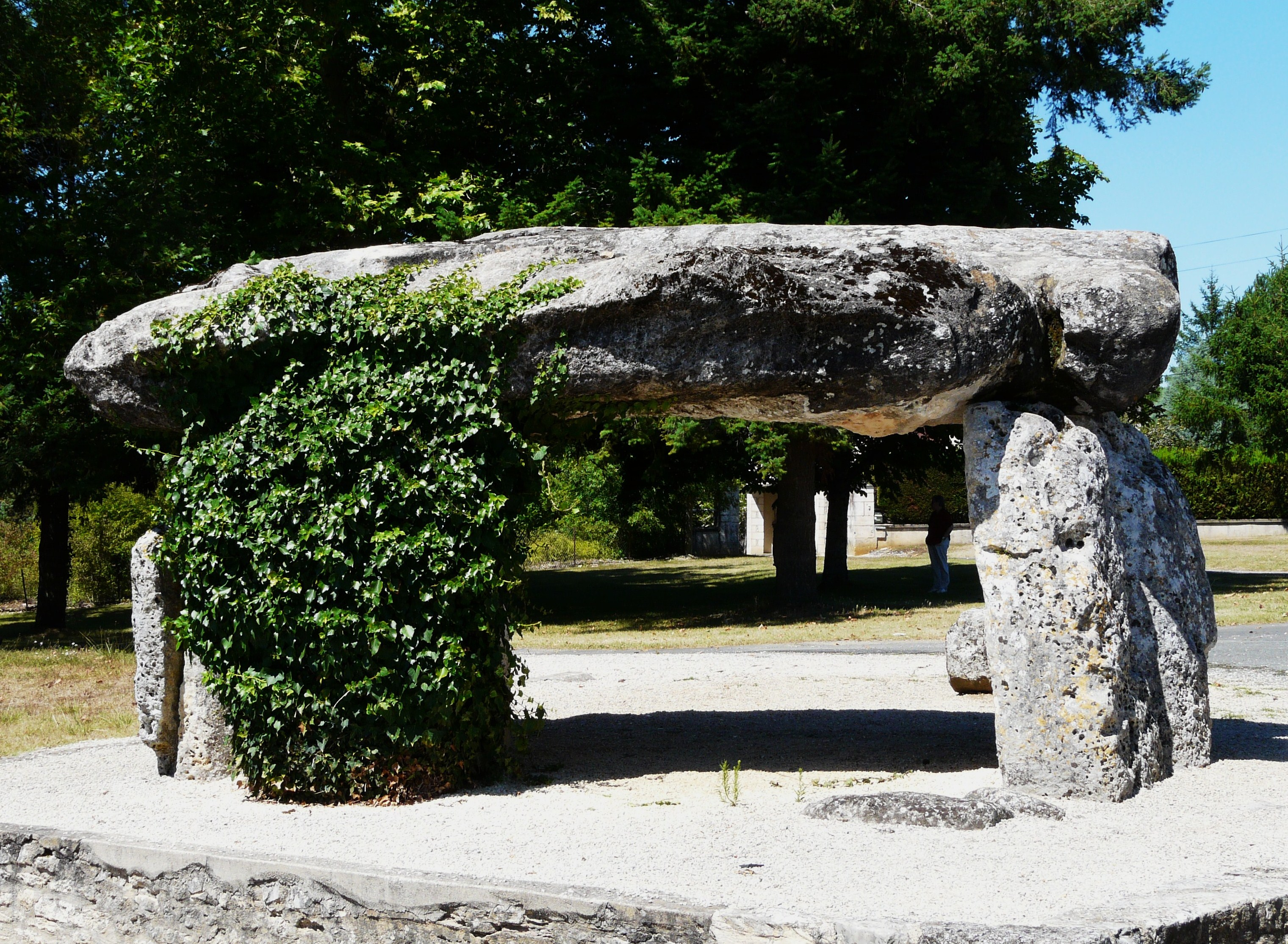
Dolmen Peyrelevade near Brantôme

From the megalithic period there are several dolmen and menhirs left behind in the park. Examples for dolmen are:

- Caillou blanc near Rochechouart
- Chez-Moutaud near Saint-Auvent
- La Côte near Saint-Laurent-sur-Gorre
- La Jalinie near Saint-Jory-de-Chalais
- La Tamanie near Oradour-sur-Vayres
- Le Fouret near Condat-sur-Trincou
- Peyre d'Ermale near Paussac-et-Saint-Vivien, somewhat outside of the park
- Peyrelevade near Brantôme, outside of the park
- Peyrelevade near Paussac-et-Saint-Vivien, outside of the park
- Pierre Plate near Veaubrunet, commune of Teyjat - remnants

Examples for menhirs are:

- Chez-Moutaud near Saint-Auvent
- Coudert-Ferry near Milhac-de-Nontron
- Firbeix near Piégut-Pluviers
- Le Fouret near Condat-sur-Trincou
- Lescuyras near Saint-Laurent-sur-Gorre
- Theil near Gorre

The dolmen and menhirs were erected about 3500 BC and are attributed to the Artenac culture. Many stone tools, stone knives, arrow heads and whetstones made from flint have been found nearby. Significant is the first occurrence of plain and adorned pottery fragments.

=== Early history ===
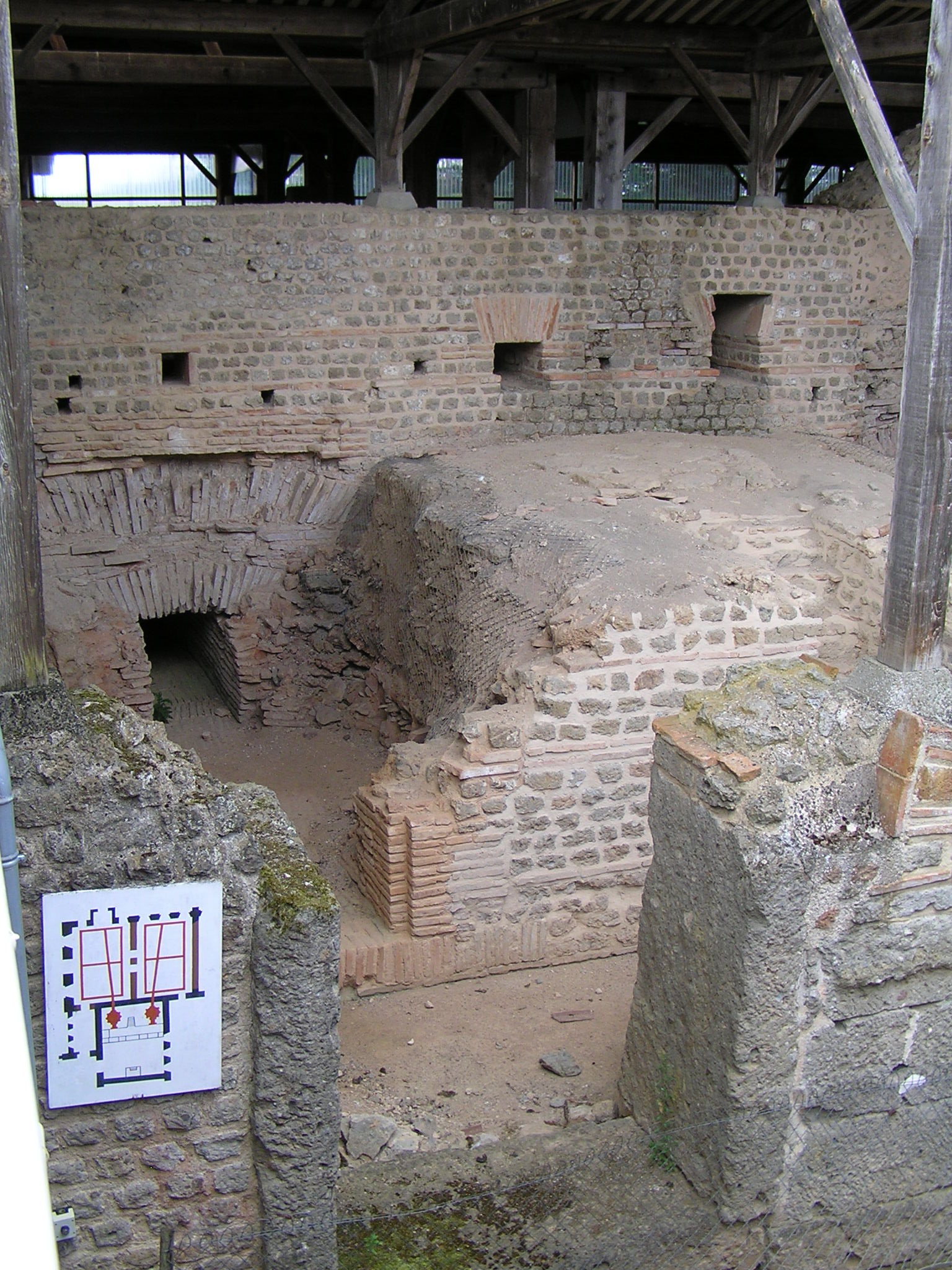
The Thermae near Chassenon

A Bronze Age settlement near Chalat, commune of Vayres, has so far yielded only insignificant findings.

From the early Iron Age date several tumuli and a necropolis. Examples are:

- Champ des Mottes near Oradour-sur-Vayres - tumuli
- Coudert-Ferry near Milhac-de-Nontron - tumulus
- La Motte near Rochechouart - tumulus and necropolis

Iron fibulae and iron knives were discovered in geometrically adorned vases that also kept the ashes of the defunct.

Several Roman sites are also known, such as the villa foundations near Nontronneau not far from Nontron. Outside the park are the thermae near Chassenon (Cassinomagus) in the Charente département. The park is traversed by the ancient Roman road Via Agrippa that connected Limoges with Saintes.

There is a Merovingian necropolis dating back to the 6th century in La Blancherie near Paussac-et-Saint-Vivien at the edge of the park.

== Sites of interest ==
In the Charente département: the reservoirs Lavaud and Mas Chaban.

In the Dordogne département: Château de Richemont, Nontron, Saut du Chalard near Champs-Romain, Château de Jumilhac in Jumilhac-le-Grand, the round dungeon tower of Piégut, Château des Bernadières near Champeaux-et-la-Chapelle-Pommier, the romanesque church in Bussière-Badil, Château de Mareuil in Mareuil, Abbey Saint-Pierre in Brantôme.

In the Haute-Vienne département: Château de Montbrun, Château de Rochechouart, the castle in Les Cars, Château de Brie near Champagnac-la-Rivière, the two castles in Châlus - Château de Châlus-Chabrol and Château de Châlus-Maulmont, the romanesque church in Salles-Lavauguyon, the church in Flavignac with reliquary, the reservoir in Bussière-Galant.

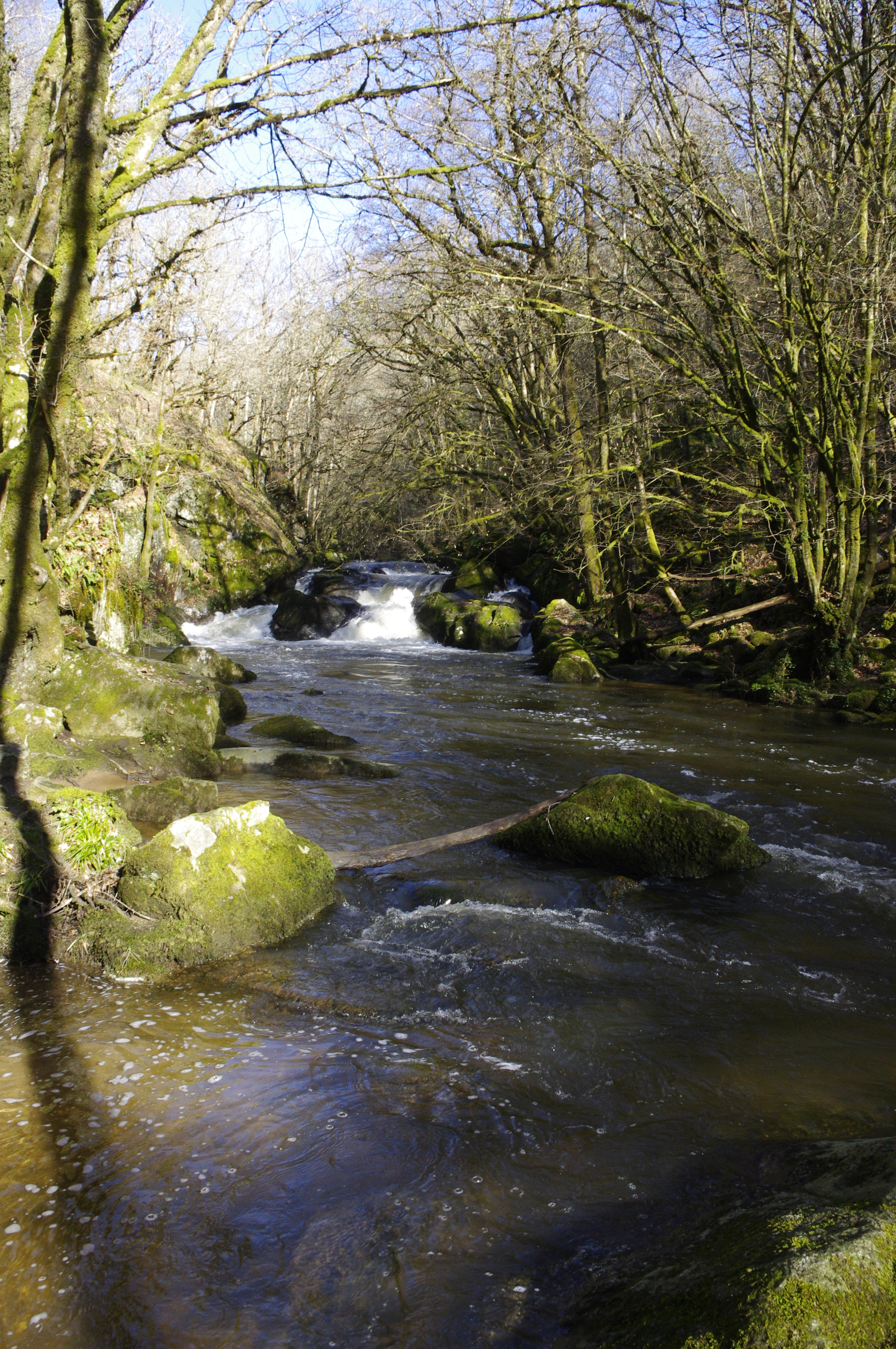
Saut du Chalard – rapids in the Dronne river

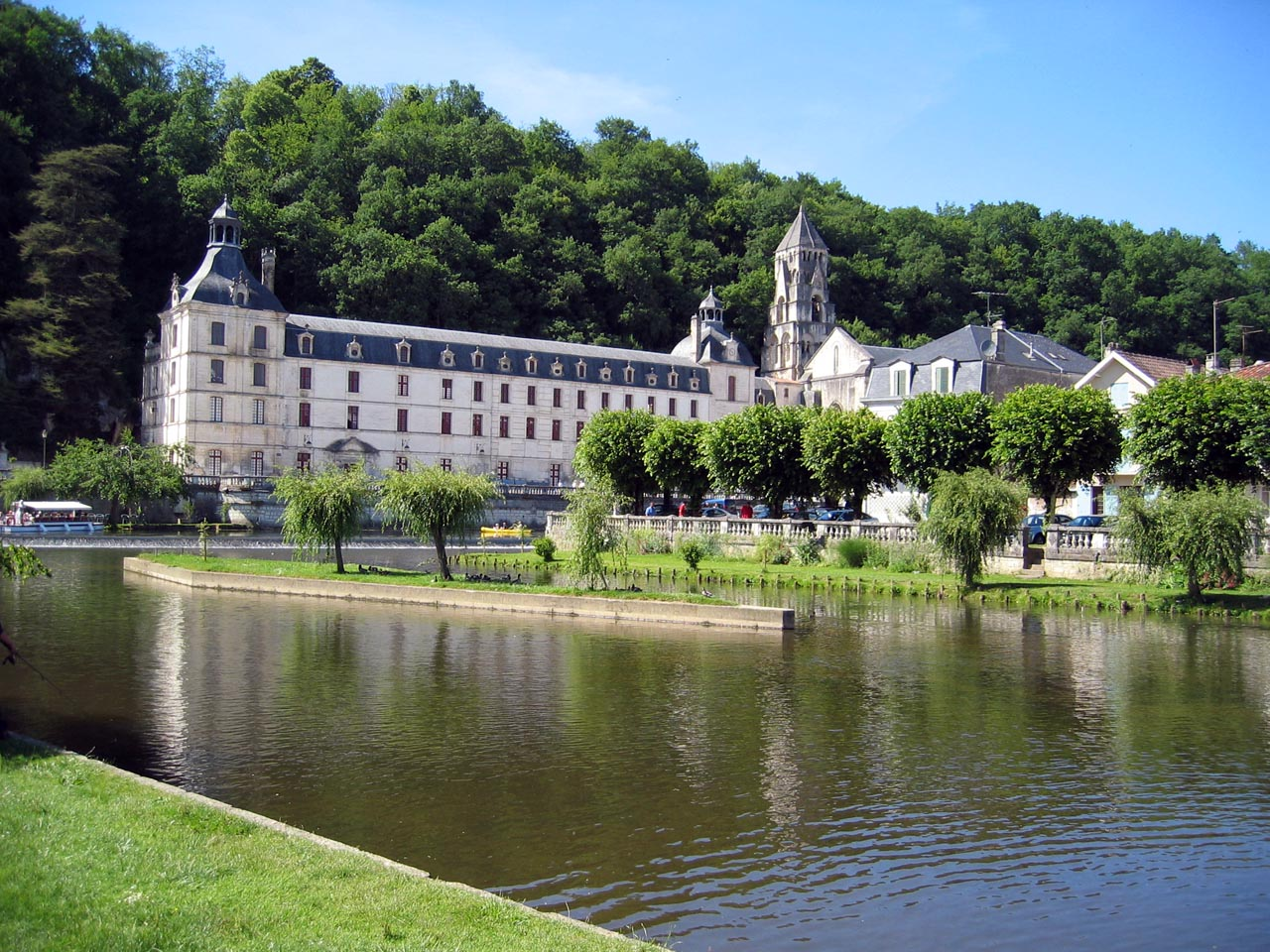
Abbey Saint-Pierre-de-Brantôme

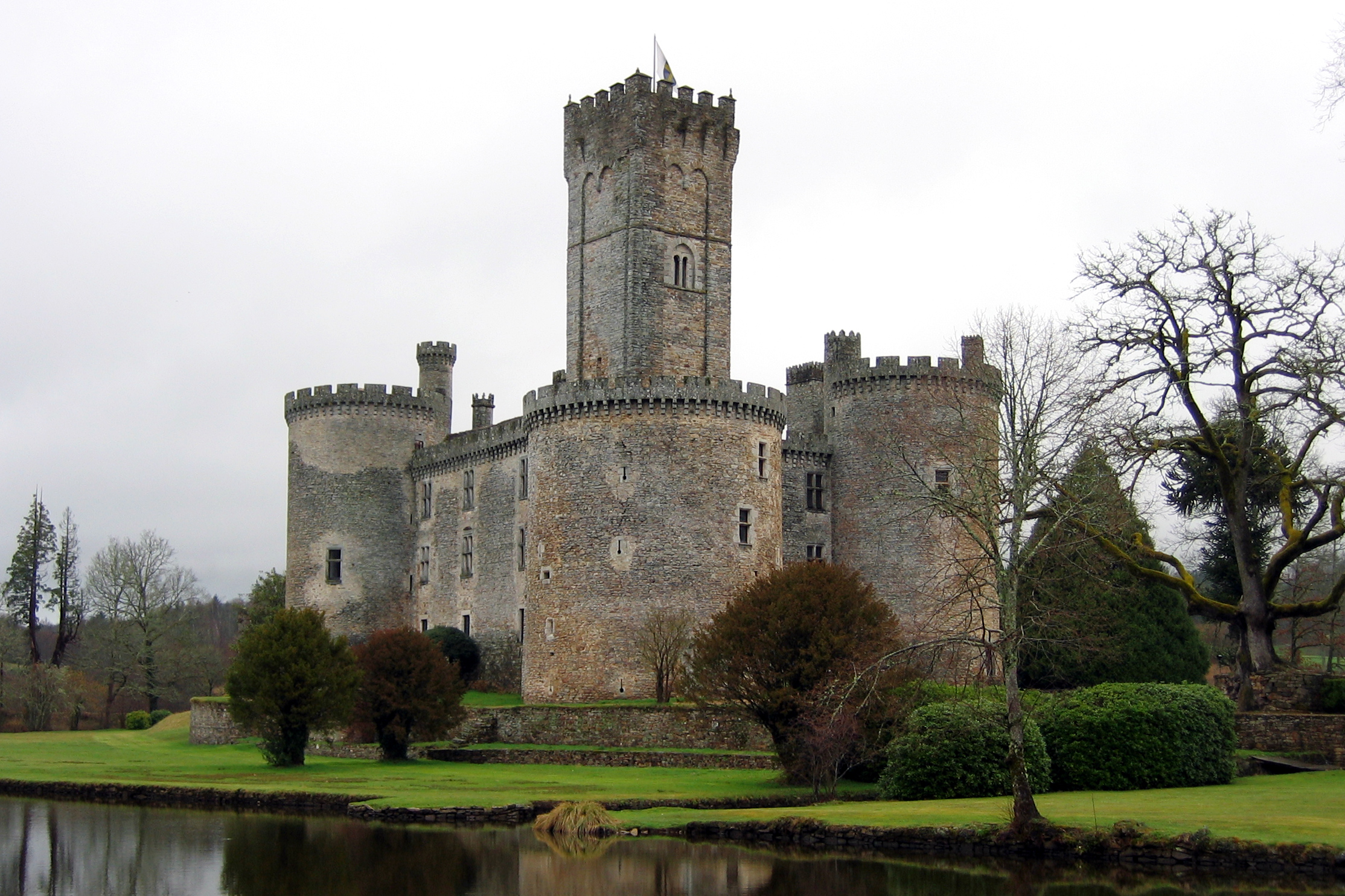
Château de Montbrun

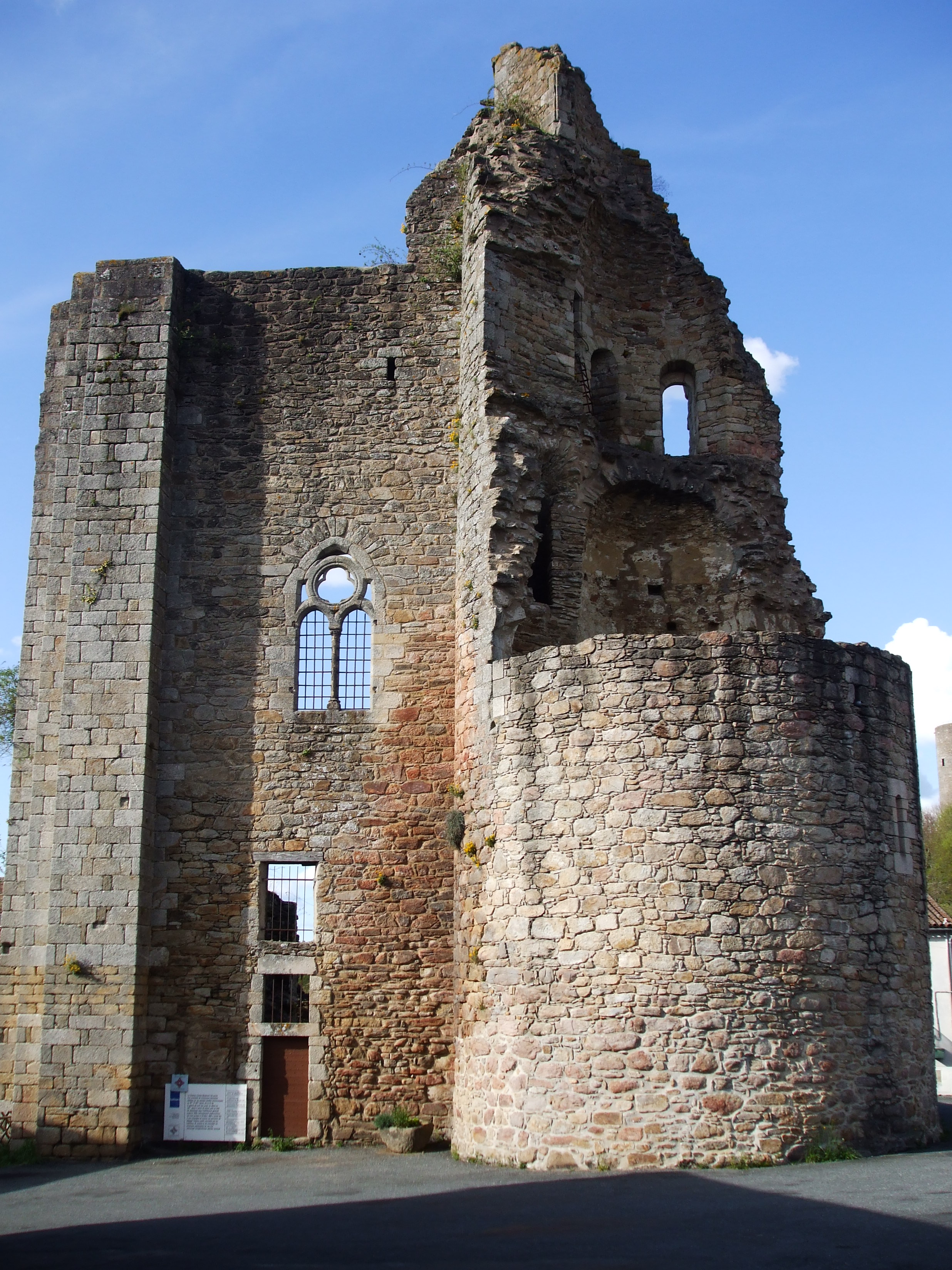
Château de Châlus-Maulmont

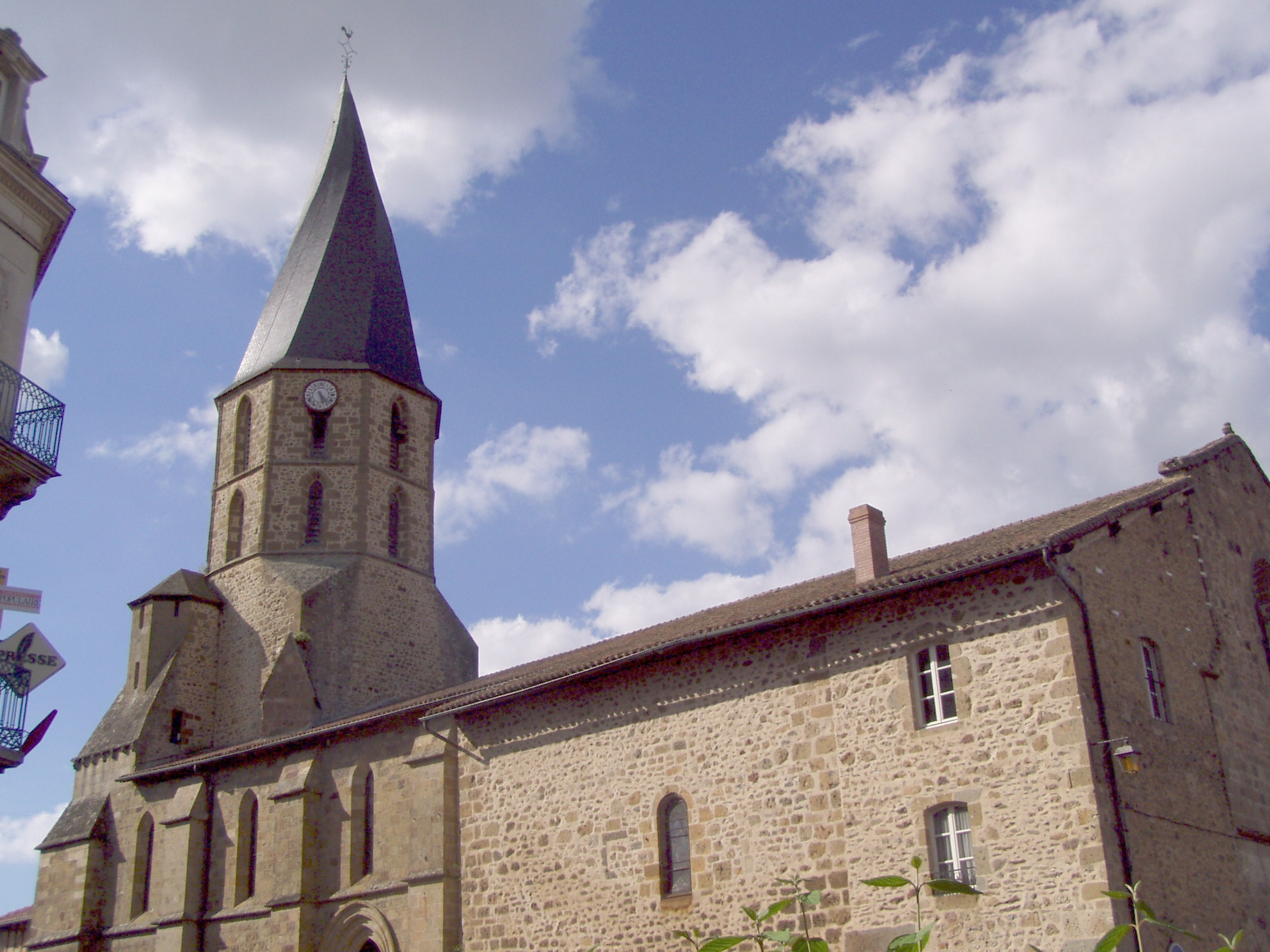
The church Saint-Sauveur in Rochechouart

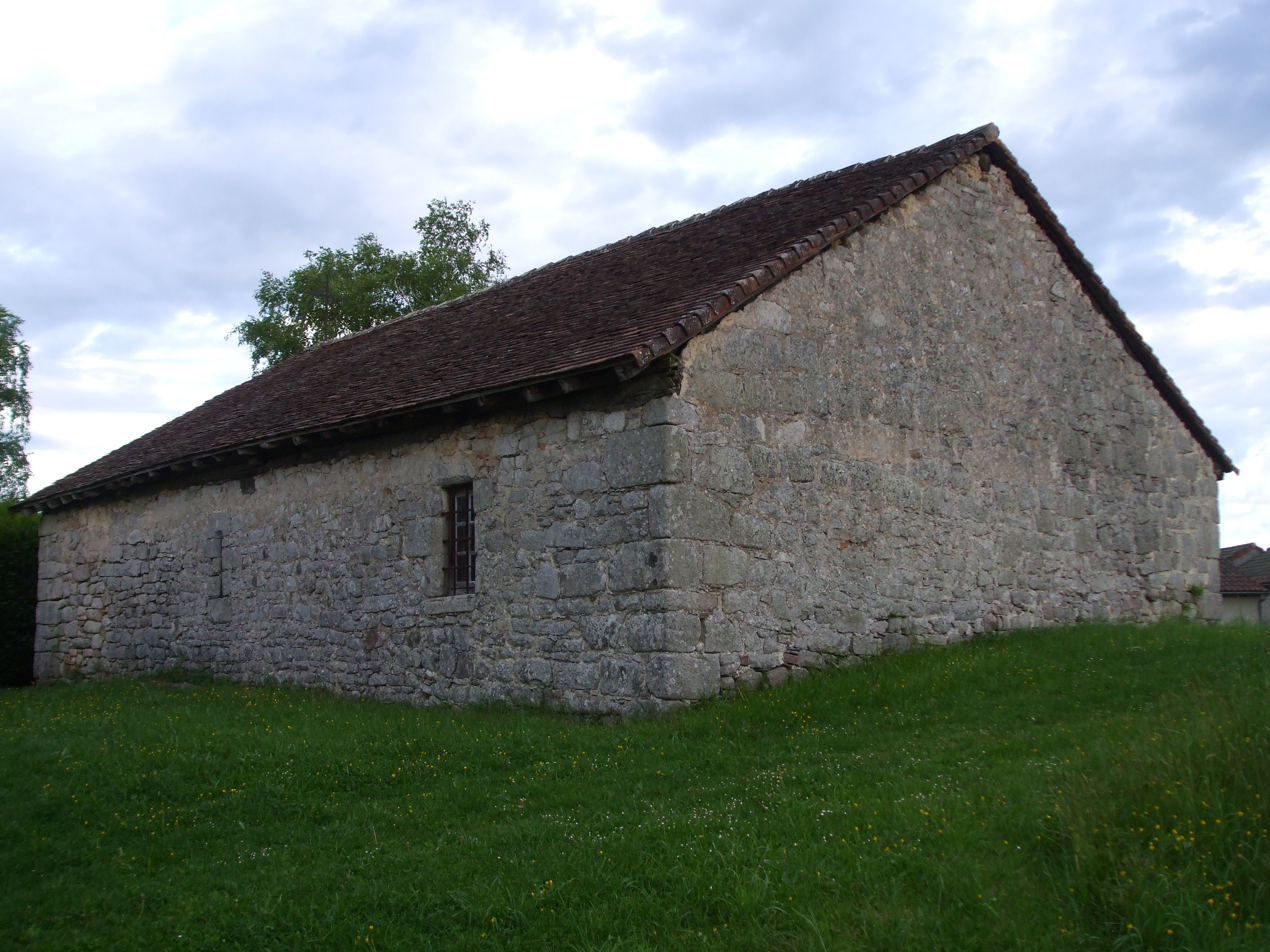
Chapel in Courbefy, close to the highest point in the park

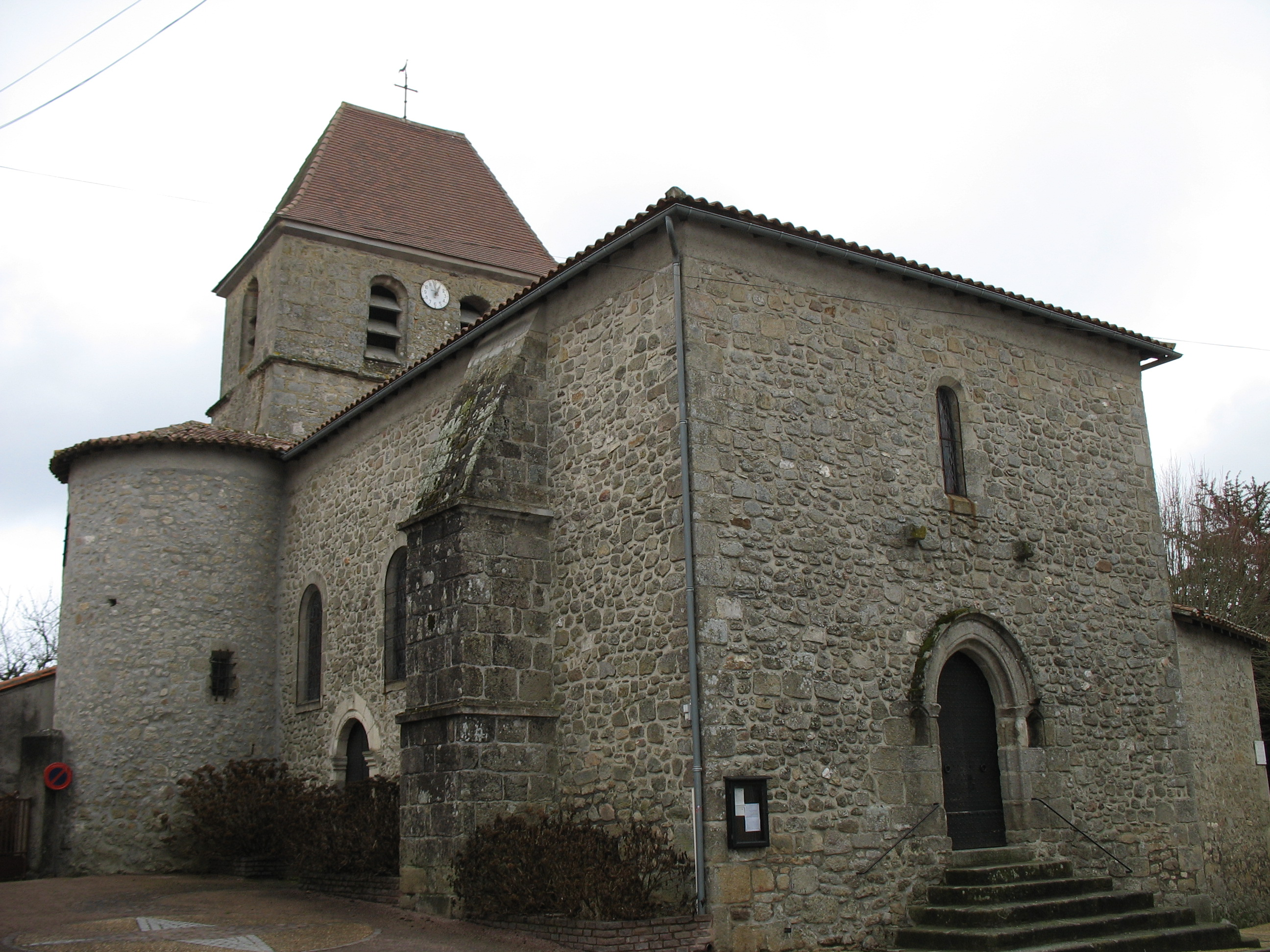
The church in Saint-Saud-Lacoussière

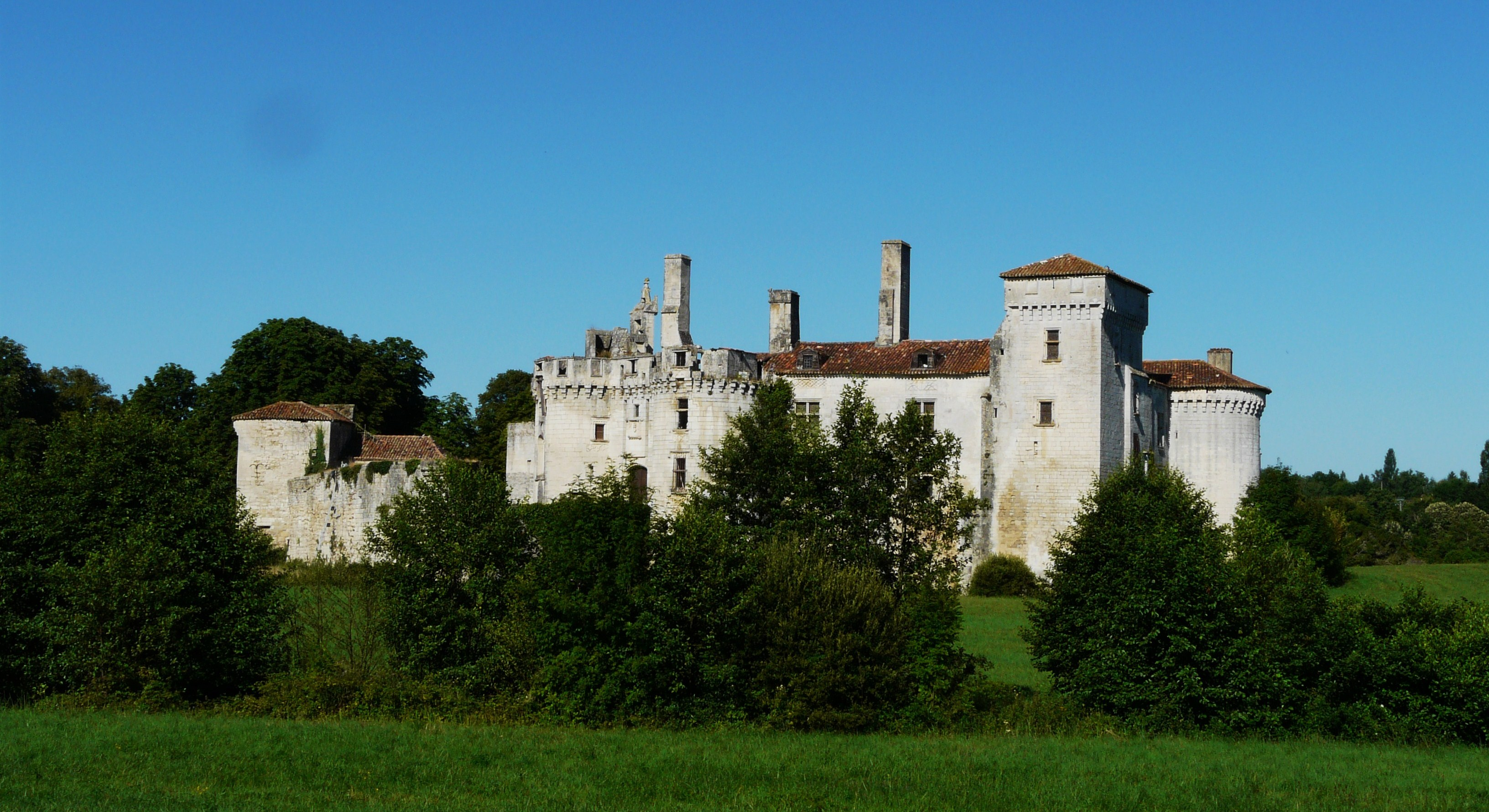
Château de Mareuil

== See also ==
- Regional natural parks of France

== Literature ==
- Aubarbier, J.L., Binet, M., Bouchard, J.P. und Guichard, G. (1991). Aimer la Préhistoire en Périgord. Éditions Ouest-France. ISBN 2-7373-0786-4
- Chèvremont, P., Floch, J.P., Ménillet, F., Stussi, J.M., Delbos, R., Sauret, B., Blès, J.L., Courbe, C. und Vuaillat, D. (1996). Carte géologique de la France à 1/50000, Feuille Rochechouart. BRGM éditions.
- Les minéraux de Nontron. Le Règne Minéral, Novembre/Décembre, Munich 2008
