= Saint-Barthélemy-de-Bussière =

- Commune
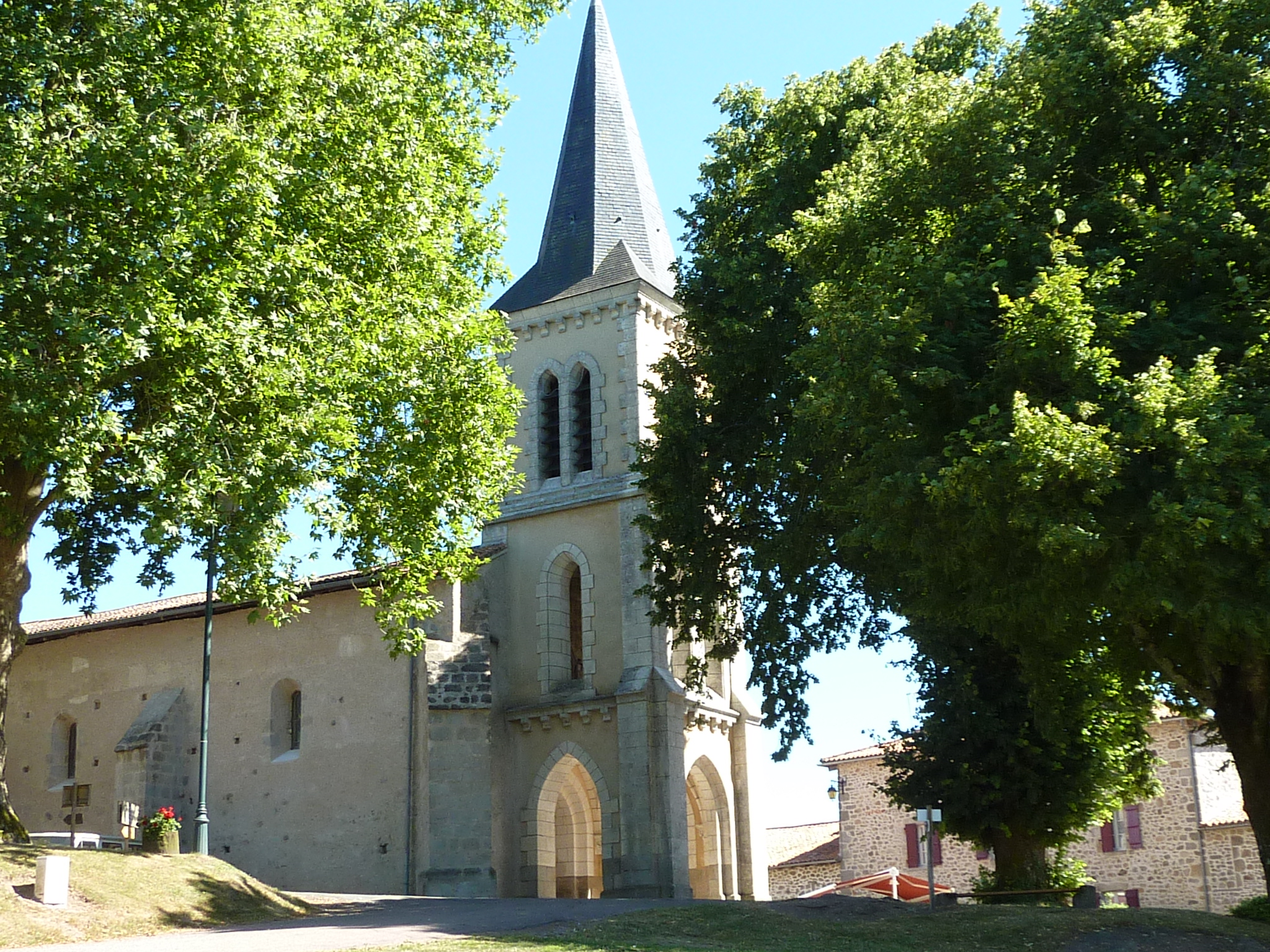
- The church in Saint-Barthélemy-de-Bussière

- Coat of arms
- Location of Saint-Barthélemy-de-Bussière
- Location within France Location within Nouvelle-Aquitaine
- Coordinates: 45°38′29″N 0°45′23″E
- Country: France
- Region: Nouvelle-Aquitaine
- Department: Dordogne
- Arrondissement: Nontron
- Canton: Périgord Vert Nontronnais

Government
  - Mayor (2020–2026): Laurent Mollon
- Area^{1}: 15.01 km^{2} (5.80 sq mi)
- Elevation: 287 m (942 ft)
- Highest elevation: 366 m (1,201 ft)
- Lowest elevation: 218 m (715 ft)
- Population (2023): 219
  - Density: 14.6/km^{2} (37.8/sq mi)
- Time zone: UTC+01:00 (CET)
  - Summer (DST): UTC+02:00 (CEST)
- INSEE/Postal code: 24381 /24360
- ^{1} French Land Register data, which excludes lakes, ponds, glaciers > 1 km^{2} (0.386 sq mi or 247 acres) and river estuaries.

Saint-Barthélemy-de-Bussière (French pronunciation: [sɛ̃ baʁtelemi də bysjɛʁ], literally Saint-Barthélemy of Bussière; Occitan: Sent Bertomiu de Bussiera) is a commune in the Dordogne department in Nouvelle-Aquitaine in southwestern France.

== Population ==
Historical population
Year	Pop.	±% p.a.
1968	345	—
1975	307	−1.65%
1982	270	−1.82%
1990	271	+0.05%
1999	244	−1.16%
2007	227	−0.90%
2012	230	+0.26%
2017	214	−1.43%
2023	219	+0.39%
Source: INSEE

== Sights ==
- Jardin botanique des oiseaux, a botanical garden

== See also ==
- Communes of the Dordogne department
