= Cussac, Haute-Vienne =

Cussac
- Commune
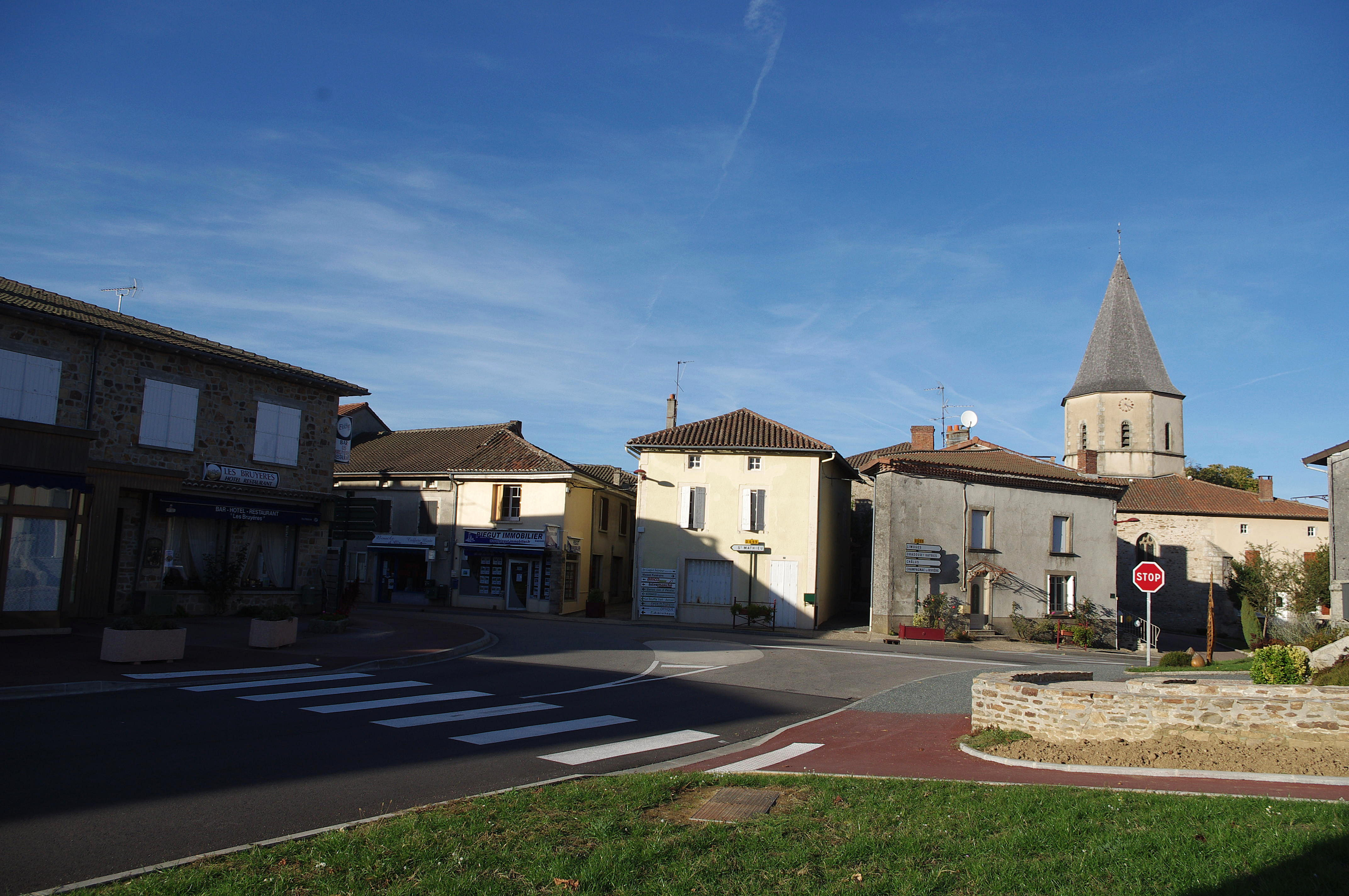
- The centre of Cussac

- Coat of arms
- Location of Cussac
- Location within France Location within Nouvelle-Aquitaine
- Coordinates: 45°42′24″N 0°51′08″E
- Country: France
- Region: Nouvelle-Aquitaine
- Department: Haute-Vienne
- Arrondissement: Rochechouart
- Canton: Rochechouart
- Intercommunality: CC Ouest Limousin

Government
  - Mayor (2020–2026): Dominique Chambon
- Area^{1}: 31.70 km^{2} (12.24 sq mi)
- Highest elevation: 476 m (1,562 ft)
- Lowest elevation: 264 m (866 ft)
- Population (2023): 1,152
  - Density: 36.34/km^{2} (94.12/sq mi)
- Time zone: UTC+01:00 (CET)
  - Summer (DST): UTC+02:00 (CEST)
- INSEE/Postal code: 87054 /87150
- ^{1} French Land Register data, which excludes lakes, ponds, glaciers > 1 km^{2} (0.386 sq mi or 247 acres) and river estuaries.

Cussac (French pronunciation: [kysak]; Occitan: Cuçac) is a commune in the Haute-Vienne department in the Nouvelle-Aquitaine region in western France. Inhabitants are known as Cussacois.

It has a supermarket, garden centre, clothes shops, chemist, Doctors, opticians, bakery, library, bars and restaurants.

The town is situated in the Parc naturel régional Périgord Limousin. There are many places for walking. There are plenty of lakes and rivers for fishing.

Unlike many villages in the area this village is increasing in population and investments are being made by the Mayor.

The nearest airport Limoges is about 45 mins away by car.

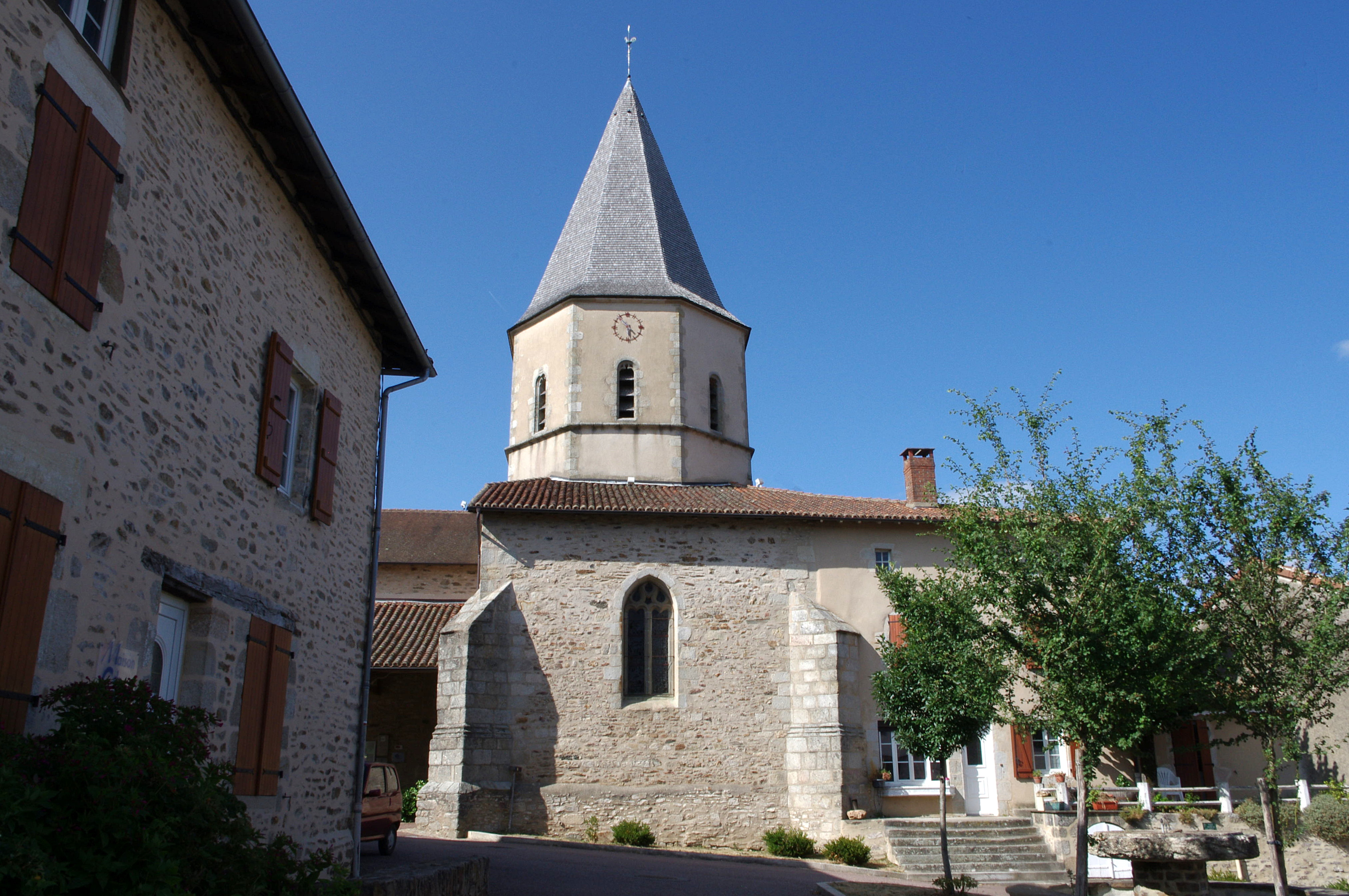
Church

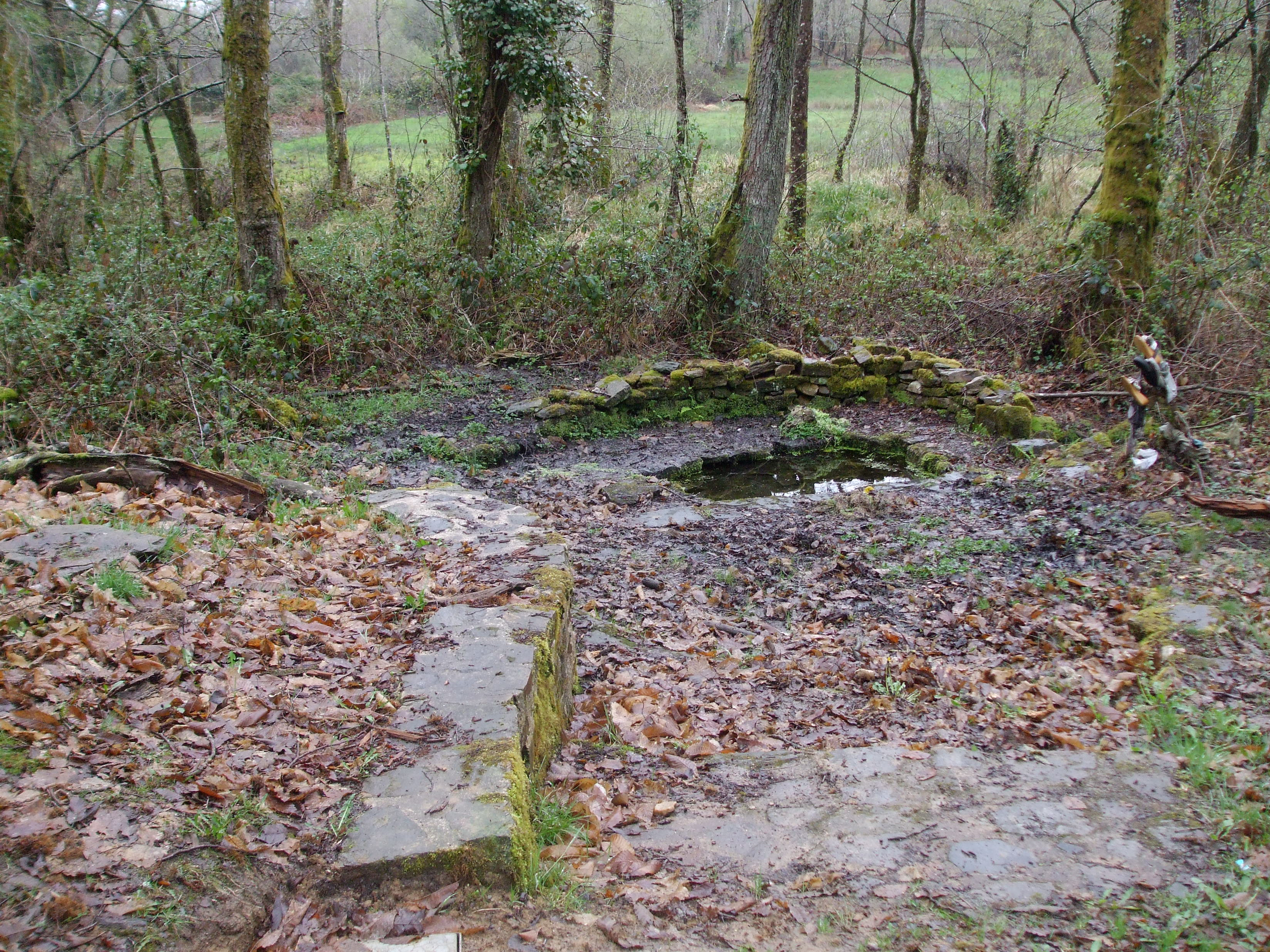
The fountain of devotion; the good fountain of La Mazaurie, in Cussac

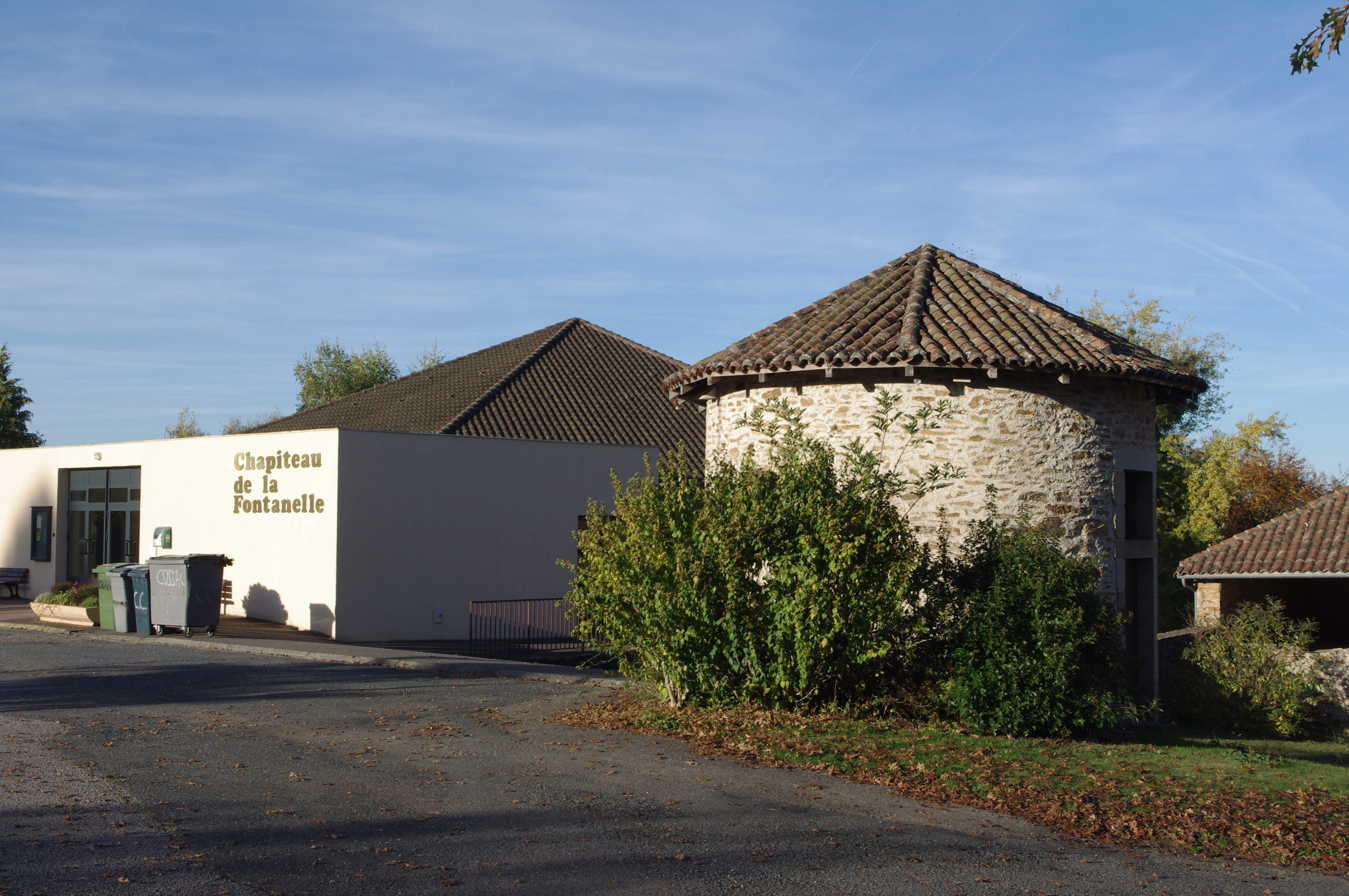
Round chestnut dryer called clédier

== See also ==
- Communes of the Haute-Vienne department
