= Jardin botanique des oiseaux =

Botanical garden in Dordogne, Aquitaine, France

Coordinates: 45°38′29″N 0°45′23″E

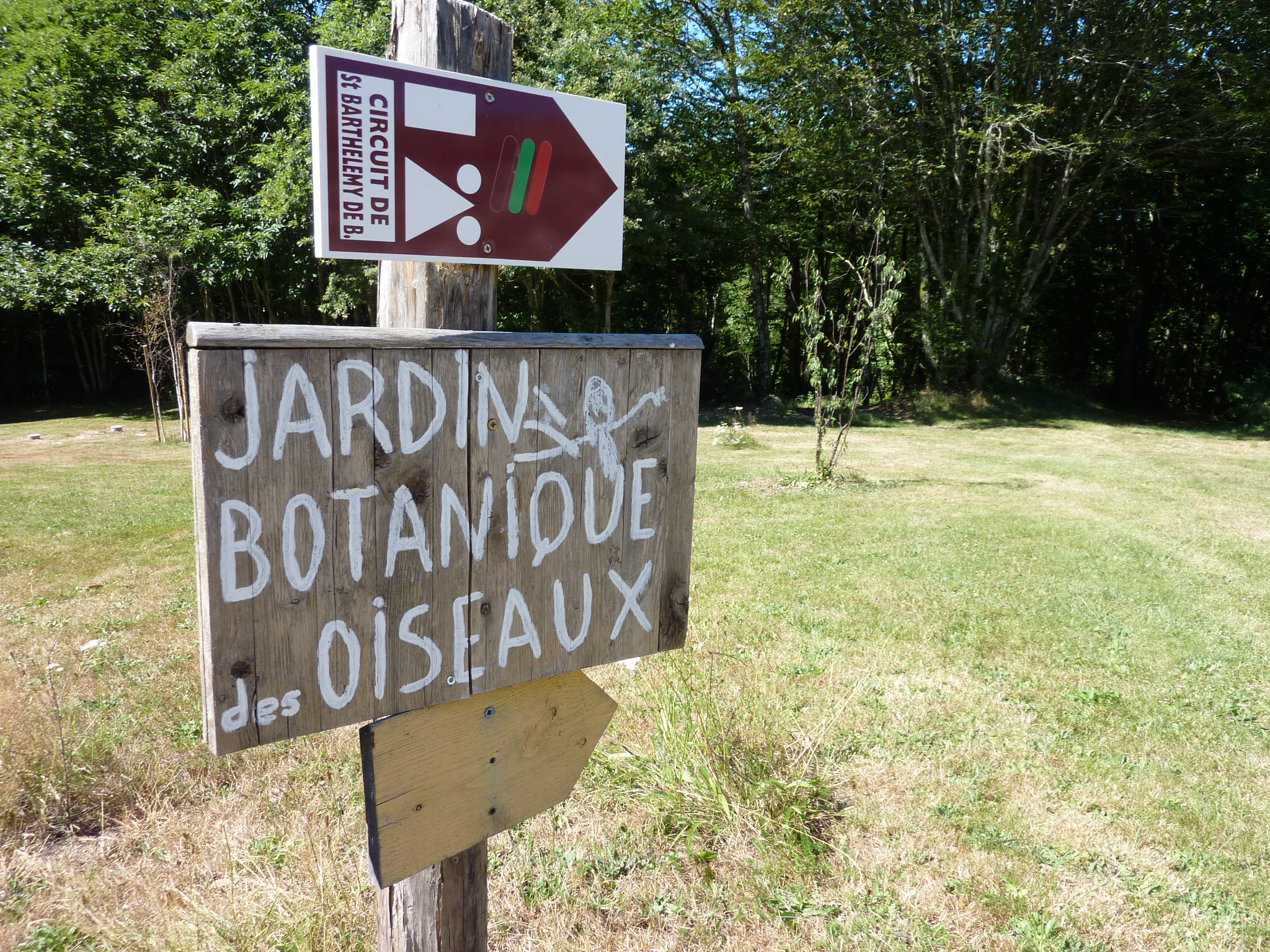
Jardin botanique des oiseaux Center in 2010

The Jardin botanique des oiseaux is a botanical garden on the grounds of the Maison Botanique in the Espace Découverte Nature et Patrimoine, located on Le Bourg, Saint-Barthélemy-de-Bussière, Dordogne, Aquitaine, France. The garden contains plants providing fruits, berries, and seeds that attract a variety of birds. It is open weekday afternoons; admission is free.

== See also ==
- List of botanical gardens in France
