= Piégut-Pluviers =

- Commune
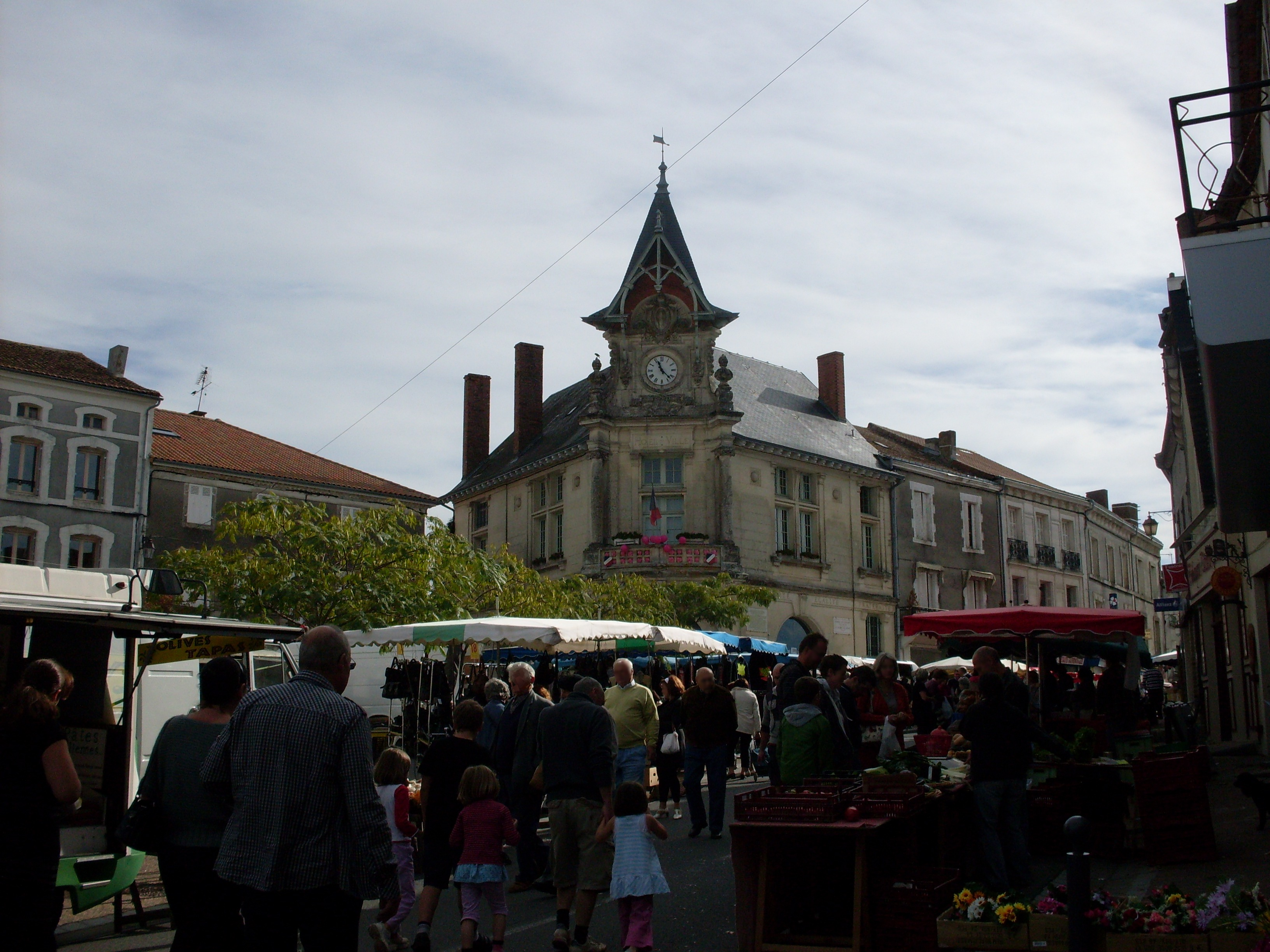
- Town hall

- Coat of arms
- Location of Piégut-Pluviers
- Location within France Location within Nouvelle-Aquitaine
- Coordinates: 45°37′25″N 0°41′25″E
- Country: France
- Region: Nouvelle-Aquitaine
- Department: Dordogne
- Arrondissement: Nontron
- Canton: Périgord Vert Nontronnais
- Intercommunality: Périgord Nontronnais

Government
  - Mayor (2020–2026): Alain Marzat
- Area^{1}: 18.11 km^{2} (6.99 sq mi)
- Highest elevation: 310 m (1,020 ft)
- Lowest elevation: 216 m (709 ft)
- Population (2023): 1,180
  - Density: 65.2/km^{2} (169/sq mi)
- Time zone: UTC+01:00 (CET)
  - Summer (DST): UTC+02:00 (CEST)
- INSEE/Postal code: 24328 /24360
- ^{1} French Land Register data, which excludes lakes, ponds, glaciers > 1 km^{2} (0.386 sq mi or 247 acres) and river estuaries.

Piégut-Pluviers (French pronunciation: [pjeɡy plyvje]; Occitan: Puei 'Gut e Pluviers) is a commune in the Dordogne department in Nouvelle-Aquitaine in southwestern France. The commune is located 45 km (28 mi) from Angoulême, 65 km (40 mi) from Périgueux and Limoges and 200 km (120 mi) from Bordeaux.

== Population ==
Historical population
Year	Pop.	±% p.a.
1968	1,545	—
1975	1,504	−0.38%
1982	1,527	+0.22%
1990	1,471	−0.47%
1999	1,313	−1.25%
2007	1,211	−1.01%
2012	1,244	+0.54%
2017	1,166	−1.29%
2023	1,180	+0.20%
Source: INSEE

== History ==
In Gallo-Roman times the place was called Podium Acutum. The castle was destroyed by Richard Lionheart in 1199, only the tower is still to be seen. The market on Wednesday morning has been held here since the seventeenth century.

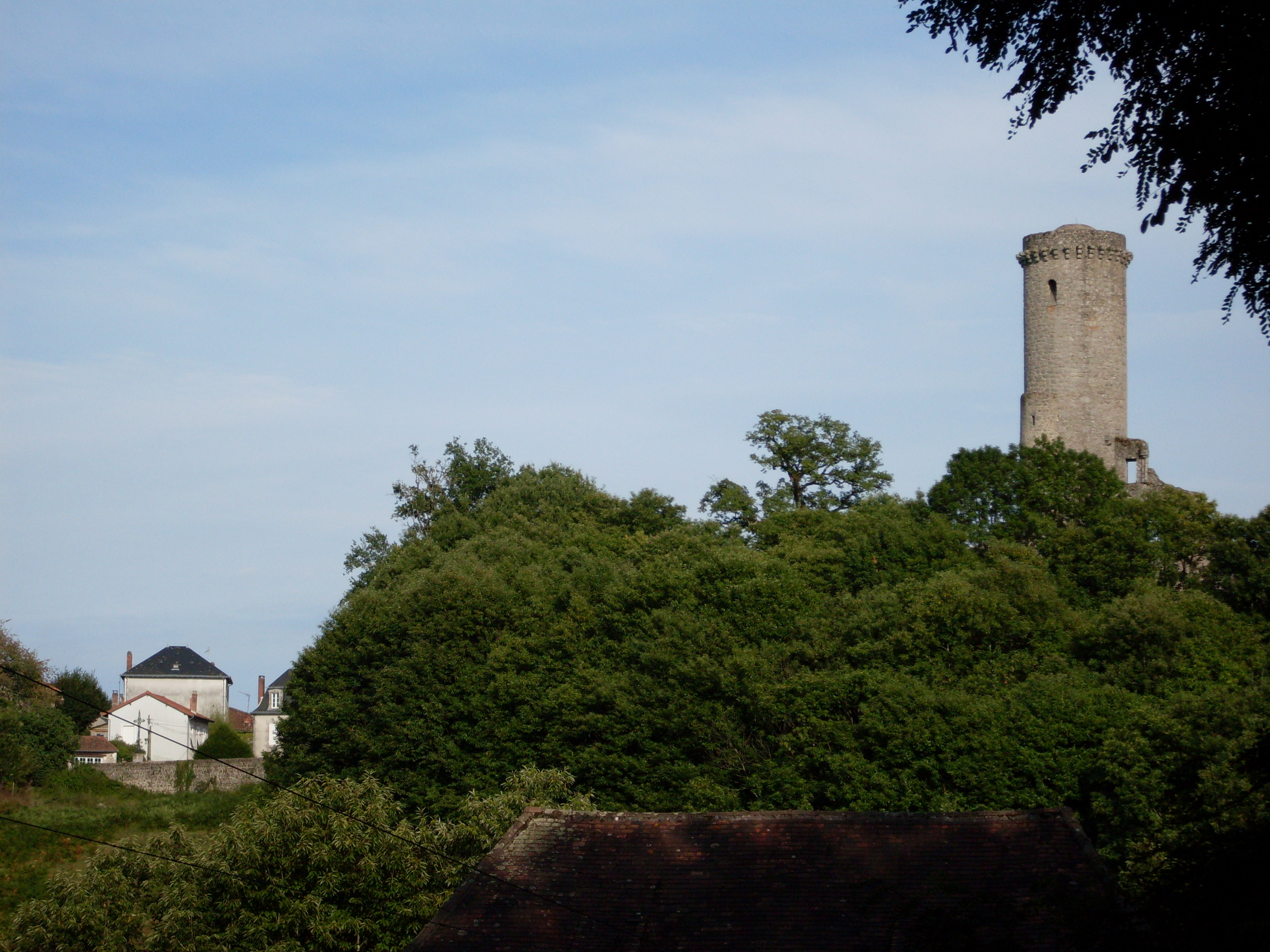
Tower of Piégut

== See also ==
- Communes of the Dordogne department
