= Château de Richemont =

Château in Dordogne, Nouvelle-Aquitaine, France

Coordinates: 45°24′38″N 0°36′50″E

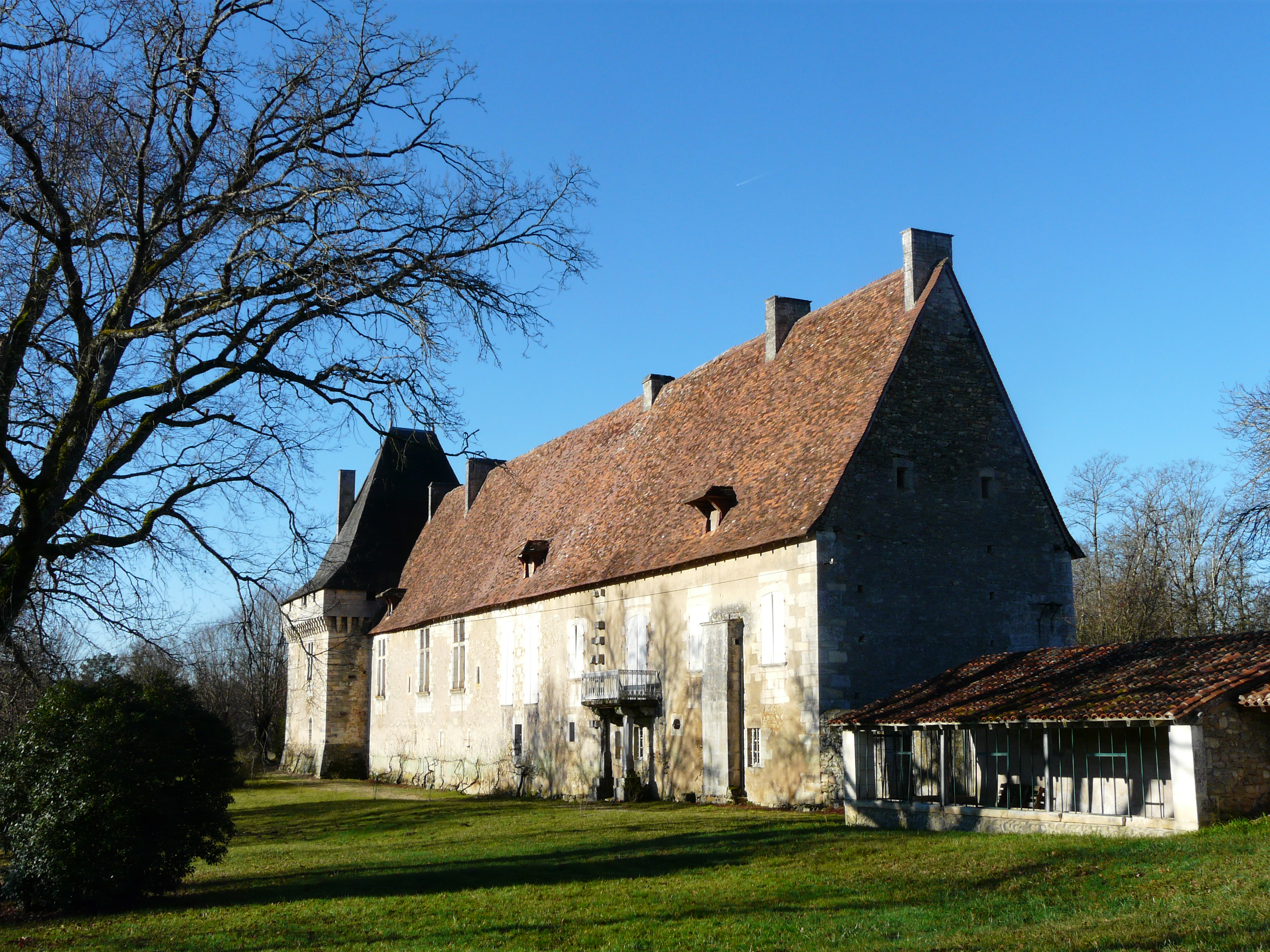

The Château de Richemont is a château in Saint-Crépin-de-Richemont, Dordogne, Nouvelle-Aquitaine, France. It is currently a private property built between 1564 and 1610. The chateau's main structure is of two perpendicular main buildings. The castle was started in 1564 by Pierre de Bourdeille.
