= Bussière-Badil =

- Commune
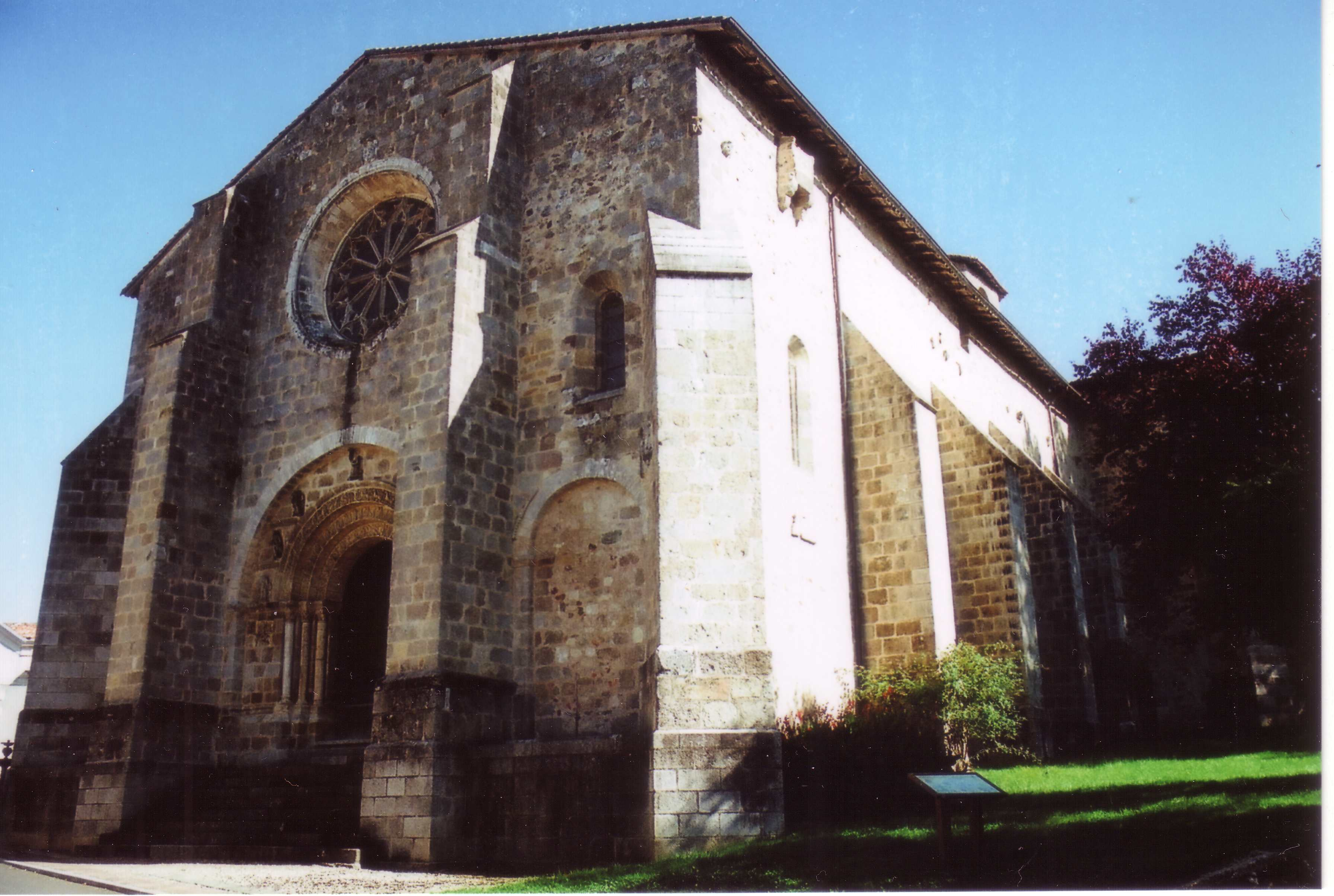
- The church in Bussière

- Coat of arms
- Location of Bussière-Badil
- Location within France Location within Nouvelle-Aquitaine
- Coordinates: 45°39′09″N 0°36′22″E
- Country: France
- Region: Nouvelle-Aquitaine
- Department: Dordogne
- Arrondissement: Nontron
- Canton: Périgord Vert Nontronnais

Government
  - Mayor (2020–2026): Jean-Jacques Lavallade
- Area^{1}: 19.86 km^{2} (7.67 sq mi)
- Elevation: 190 m (620 ft)
- Highest elevation: 292 m (958 ft)
- Lowest elevation: 125 m (410 ft)
- Population (2023): 386
  - Density: 19.4/km^{2} (50.3/sq mi)
- Time zone: UTC+01:00 (CET)
  - Summer (DST): UTC+02:00 (CEST)
- INSEE/Postal code: 24071 /24360
- ^{1} French Land Register data, which excludes lakes, ponds, glaciers > 1 km^{2} (0.386 sq mi or 247 acres) and river estuaries.

Bussière-Badil (French pronunciation: [bysjɛʁ badil]; Occitan: Bussiera Badiu) is a commune in the Dordogne department in southwestern France, part of the Parc naturel régional Périgord Limousin.

The place is first mentioned in 768 when the Order of Saint Benedict built a priory there. The Romanesque art-style church was built in the 12th century.

== Population ==
Historical population
Year	Pop.	±% p.a.
1968	584	—
1975	595	+0.27%
1982	540	−1.38%
1990	530	−0.23%
1999	523	−0.15%
2007	499	−0.59%
2012	444	−2.31%
2017	391	−2.51%
2023	386	−0.21%
Source: INSEE

== See also ==
- Communes of the Dordogne department
- Parc naturel régional Périgord Limousin
