= Soufflaculs of Nontron =

French festivity

The Soufflaculs of Nontron
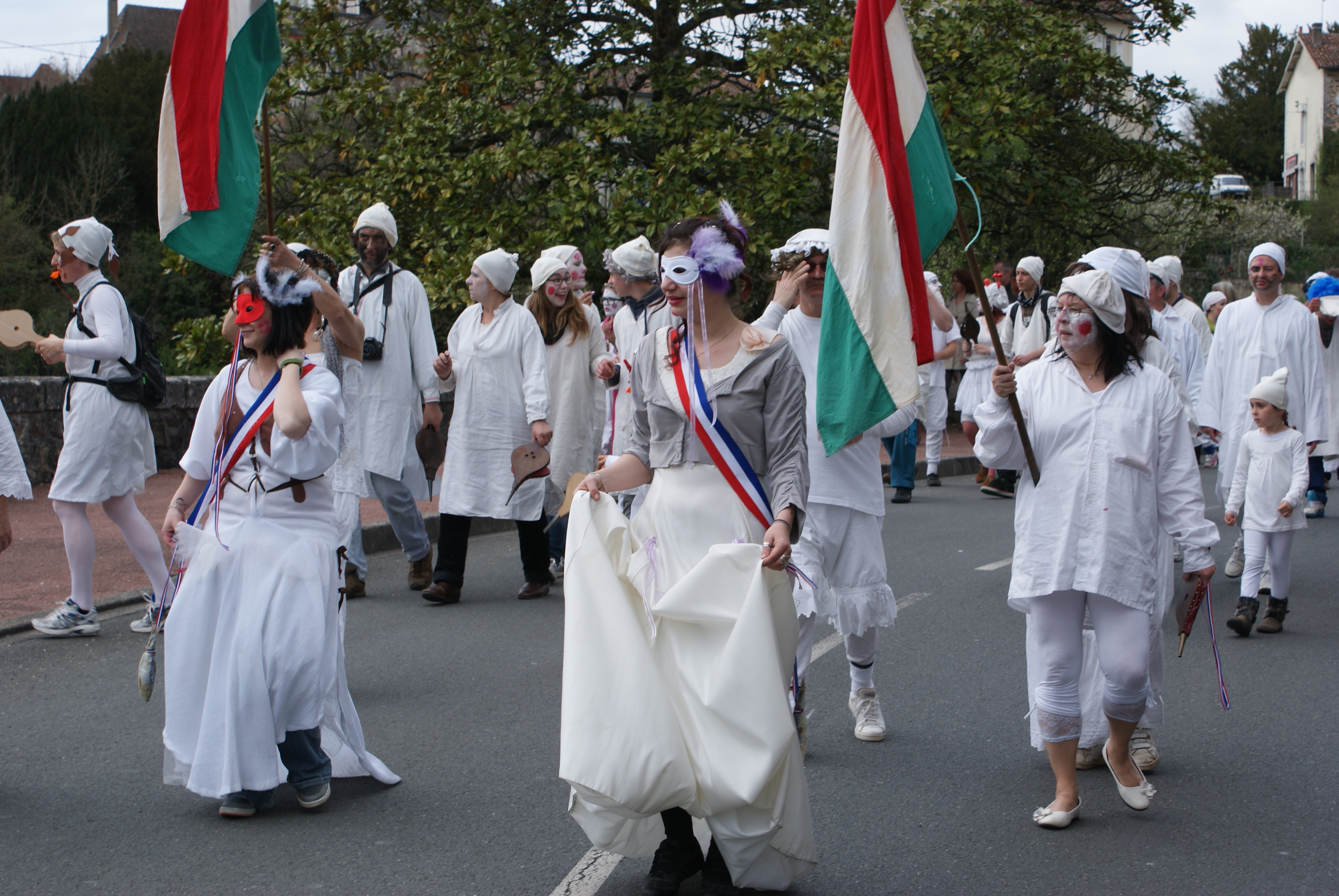
- Type: Festive practices

The Soufflaculs de Nontron is a popular tradition in the town of Nontron, in the French department of Dordogne in the Nouvelle-Aquitaine region. Initially widespread in the south of France, this carnival festival has survived in only a few localities, most notably Nontron. The day's celebrations are marked by the parade of the Soufflaculs, dressed in nightgowns and white cotton bonnets, whose mission is to march through the town with a bellows, chasing away any evil spirits hiding under women's skirts.

During this masquerade, which dates back to the Middle Ages, people originally dressed up to mock the rich, the ecclesiastics and the powerful. Despite economic and political difficulties in remaining active from one year to the next, this carnival remains the major event in local festive life. Listed in France's Inventory of Intangible Cultural Heritage since 2010, the Soufflaculs of Nontron have become famous for their comic, caricatured and satirical vision of society.

== History ==
=== Origins of Soufflaculs ===
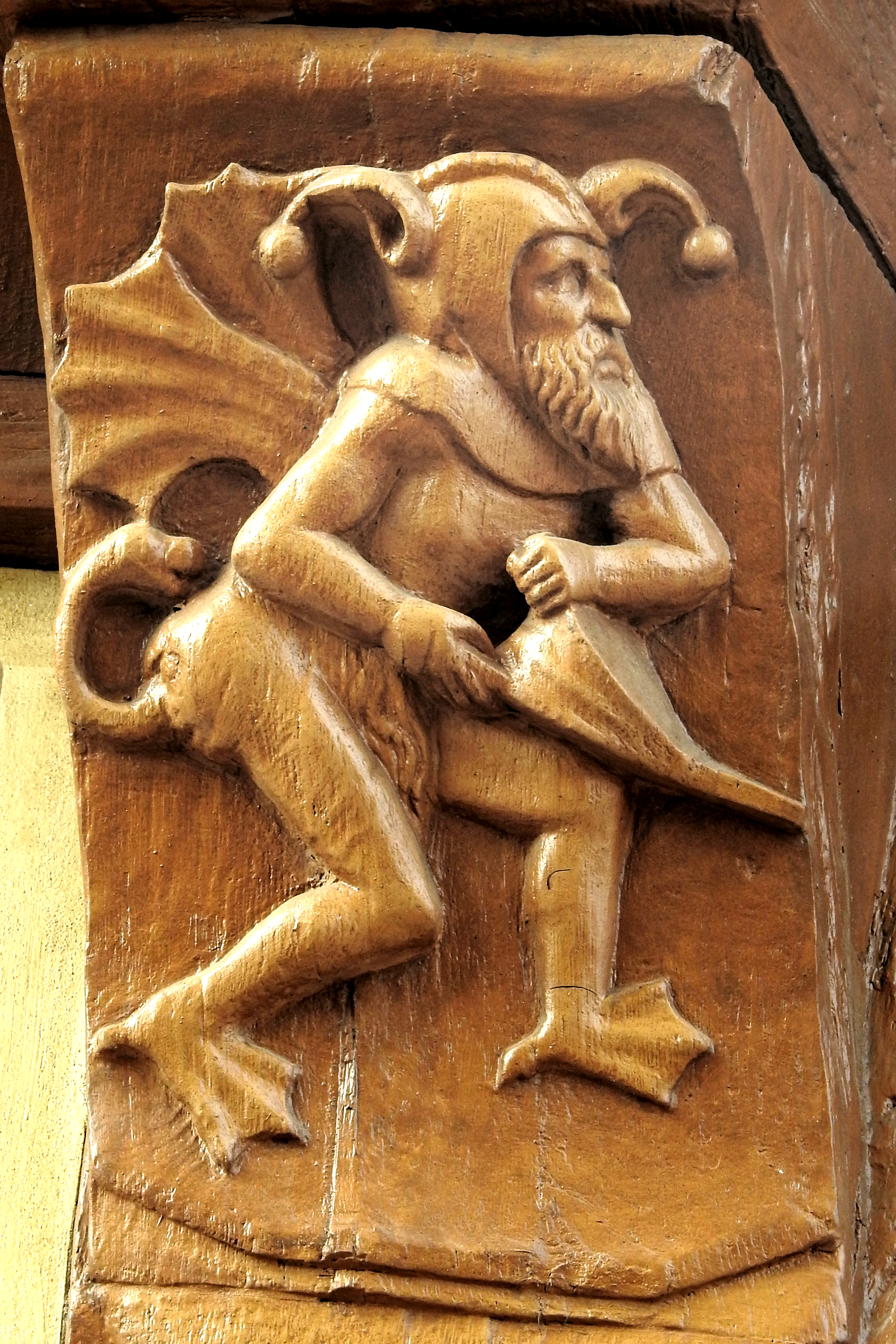
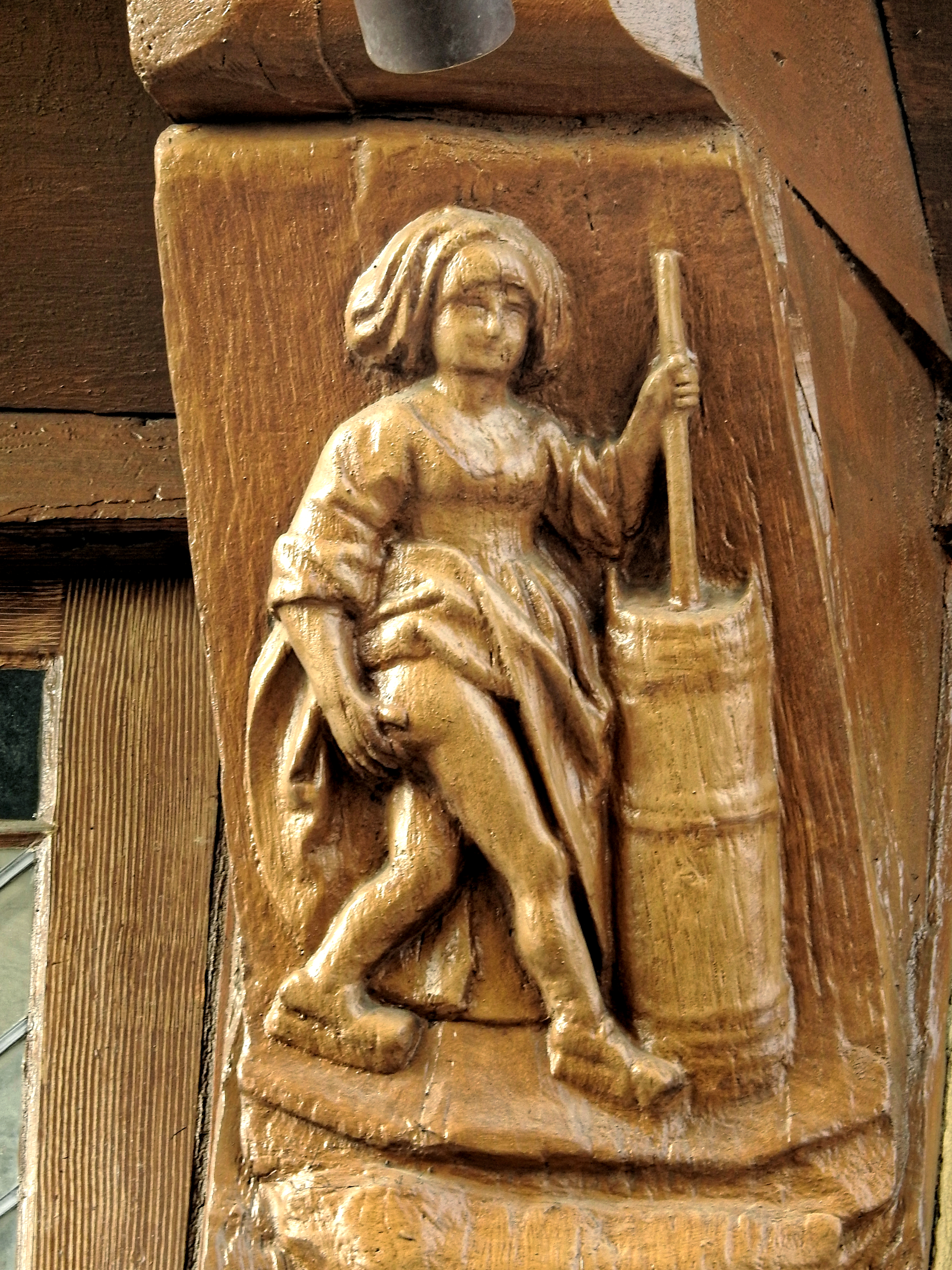
Ornaments carved on the Brusttuch House in Goslar (Germany). An imp is preparing to blow the wind out of a witch with his bellows. This ritual is repeated in the Soufflaculs tradition.

There are few archives or historical evidence to fully trace the origins of Soufflaculs. The oldest known iconography of the souffle-à-cul dates back to the 16th century, and appears to be the bas-reliefs carved on the wood outside the Hotel Brusttuch in Goslar, Germany. A demon is depicted with a poppy and crow's feet, preparing with his bellows to wind a witch whose right arm is in the position of an anal offering. His churn overflows with cream stolen during Walpurgis Night. However, a 13th-century medieval manuscript, a 14th-century cul-de-lampe in Troyes' Saint-Pierre-et-Saint-Paul cathedral and a 15th-century banner of the Compagnie de la Mère-Folle seem to allude to a similar use of bellows before the 16th century.

The souffle-à-cul is a carnivalesque tradition from the Middle Ages that takes different forms in different regions of France. Generally speaking, the character of "la vieille Bouchée" – an elderly, extremely thin, religious and prudish lady who never stops farting in a church – is used as a personification of the carnival cycle. The venting of old Bouchée can be seen as a symbol of Lent, which, on Ash Wednesday, is equivocation with the help of a bellows. Often compared to a childish game or, on the contrary, to an obscene gesture, the practice of souffle-à-cul consists in reversing the internal circuit of breath and soul in our body, from top to bottom and bottom to top, to expel evil spirits.

Increasingly popular in the 18th century, the practice of souffle-à-cul is mainly found in the south of France. In some departments, a Catalan variant is known as the "danse du feu aux fesses" (or "Tiou-tiou"): participants each light a paper corkscrew hanging from the buttocks of the person in front of them. Soufflaculs do not appear to have appeared in Nontron until the 19th century.

=== The Soufflaculs in 19th-century Nontron ===
Le Nontronnais of 16 February 1850 is the first known press title to mention the practice of souffle-à-cul in Nontron: "Autrefois, dans la basse ville des bals magnifiques, que la mascarade des Soufflets était originale, qu'elle exécutait avec ensemble une manœuvre que nos lecteurs qualifieront comme ils l'entendront, que les costumes étaient frais et blancs...". Journalists avoid talking about this popular tradition, which was morally reprehensible at the time and would run counter to their readers' values. Others talk about it, but condemn it as "crude, vulgar and obscene".

On 8 March 1851 Le Nontronnais devoted a long column to a description of the carnival, but only described the ball attire, disguises and masks worn by the participants. In 1865, as evidenced by an article published on April 1 of that year, a dozen or so people dressed up as they pleased: costumes of Don Quixote, the Musketeers, Sancho Panza, the pages of François I, Louis XIV, Mephistopheles, Harlequin and Pierrot were seen around town. The number of participants varied from one edition to the next: five or six Soufflaculs in 1872, around thirty in 1894 and forty in 1900.

In February 1894, the Courrier de Nontron was the first newspaper to publish a chronological description of the Nontronnais carnival. The four-day festivities kick off on Sunday evening, when the Nontronnais are invited to a masked ball held in the large hall of the former Café Italien. On Monday, the young participants dress up and improvise a cavalcade through the streets of Nontron. Soufflaculs judge and burn Carnaval on Ash Wednesday.

On the same day, two celebrations are held in Nontron, as well as in Daglan, Terrasson-Lavilledieu and Périgueux. The first, called "l'assouade", consists in having cuckolded or beaten husbands mounted on a donkey. Particularly in Nontron, the husbands are seated upside down, facing the donkey's hindquarters, which are winded by a bellows. The husbands are taken for a walk and publicly mocked throughout the town, dressed in a dress, kerchief and coif. The second tradition, less widespread than the first, is called the "horns". About thisː

"On this day [...], all those who were married in the carnival year that ended a year earlier, on the same day, gather in disguise and masks [...]. The last bridegroom among them wears a pitchfork with two ox horns stuck in the two prongs [...]. The troop [...] goes in procession to the home of the first groom of the carnival year that ends today. In front of the door, people line up in a semicircle; the music gives the aubade, then falls silent. Then the oldest groom in the group steps forward, and [...] calls the man three times by his [...] nickname. [...] So he arrives, and when he's on the doorstep, the music bursts out raucously. Then silence falls, and the man steps forward [...]. First he is made to bow low to the pitchfork held in the center of the circle [...], then he is made to kneel [...] and to recite farcical questions [...].When he has answered, he is made to recite, dictating it word for word, a profession of faith to burst with laughter, by which he promises, among other things, to be deaf and blind. [The] horns are lowered towards him and crown his head for a moment, and then he is made to kiss them [...]. The leader of the troupe pronounces a burlesque formula [...], makes the man stand up and embraces him, while the music resumes with great noise. [...] The whole troupe heads for the second groom's house, where [the farce] begins again [...], then on to the third, and so on, until the last groom, who carries the horned contraption to the inn, where the troupe suppers in great merriment."

— Eugène Le Roy, Le Moulin du Frau (1891).

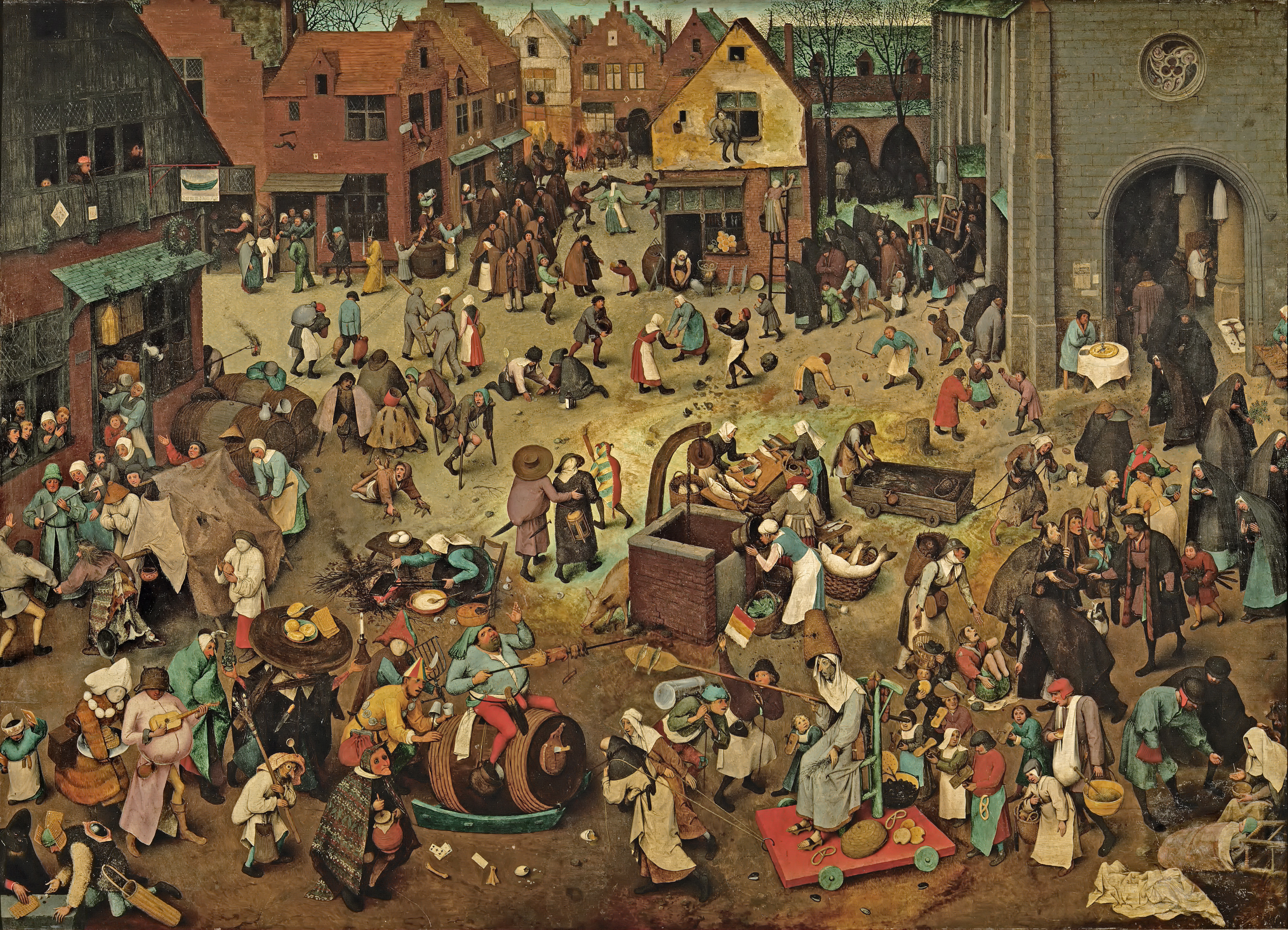
Le Combat de Carnaval et Carême (painted in oils by Pieter Brueghel the Elder in 1559) depicts the contrast between Mardi Gras and Ash Wednesday, the beginning of Lent in the Middle Ages.

Until the beginning of the 20th century, Nontron's carnival was above all the "pig festival". Each owner (whether farmer, sharecropper, cabaret owner or bourgeois) raised a piglet, often the last of the litter, to take part in the "pig slaughter" on Shrove Saturday, three days before the carnival. Once the men have slaughtered and butchered the animal, the women wash the offal in the morning to make pork fricassee. With famine a regular occurrence in Périgord, and winter synonymous with food deprivation, fricassee, which is rich in fat and calories, is one of the best dishes of the carnival period. Pieces of liver, spleen, osseline and sweetbreads are sautéed in a richly spiced onion sauce. The dish is served on toasted garlic bread. Saturday afternoons, Sundays and Mondays are devoted to making boudins cooked in salted water.

In the tradition of Bœuf Gras, essentially perpetuated after the First World War, the people of Nontron also enjoy pieces of beef. The animals are tied to rings set into the floor of the town hall, before being slaughtered by the butcher in front of the town's children. The oxen are deliberately stunned, bled and skinned in front of the customers, so that they can see the quality of the merchandise. On Shrove Saturday, the village fair is the perfect place to stock up on meat, hung on butcher's hooks and decorated with garlands and blossoming fir branches. Soups, stuffings, tarts, pies and doughnuts are also on sale. Meat in particular is eaten in abundance in every household (two or three dishes per person), on the eve of the first day of abstinence in Lent.

=== Les Soufflaculs de Nontron since 1979 ===
Soufflaculs tradition in 1947. Dark green: Soufflaculs only. Olive green: Soufflaculs + buttocks fire dance. Red: Buttocks fire dance only.

Having fallen into disuse in the 1950s, and after an attempt to revive it in 1968, the Nontron carnival was reborn in 1979, under the impetus of the local rugby association and the Compagnie des soufflets de Nontron, an association under the law of 1901 and chaired by Michel Meyleu. It was from this date onwards that the Soufflaculs were organized every year, on a Sunday in April. Along with the commune of Saint-Claude (Jura), the tradition continues in the Dordogne and Hérault regions, with over thirty villages taking part since the late 1970s.

Although the town of Nontron generally uses it as a genuine tourism promotion tool, the event sometimes comes up against a lack of financial resources or disagreements with some of the successive mayors, preventing it from taking place in certain years. Moreover, the originality that Soufflaculs had enjoyed for several decades began to be lacking in the late 1980s: the carnival's lack of novelty and modernity led to a drop in the number of participants and spectators. Organizers tried to incorporate other historical carnival figures, while preserving the Soufflaculs' identity.

Nontron's Soufflaculs are part of the town's cultural heritage, handed down from generation to generation. In 1986, a statue of a Soufflacul in action was built by a local high school class. In 2003, a South Korean TV crew came to Nontron to film the Soufflaculs, becoming the first foreign media to broadcast the event. One of Nontron's thoroughfares is named "Rue des Soufflets".

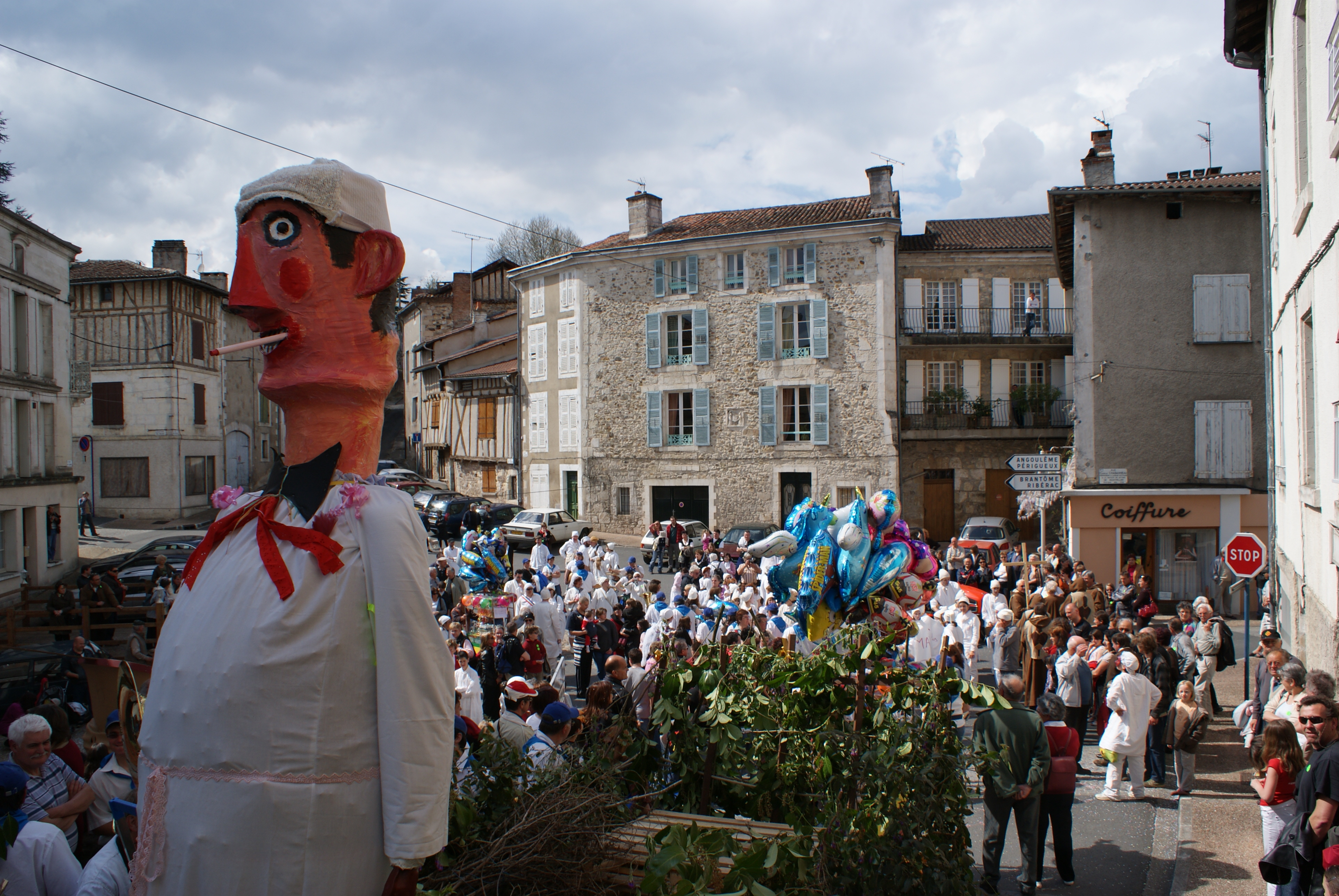
Bufador is towed through the audience in 2009.

As part of the "Institut Occitan 2008–2010" mission led by Marie Hirigoyen and Christine Escarmant-Pauvert, a survey was carried out in Nontron on 26-27 April 2008, 7 January 2009 and 17-18 April 2010, to determine the status of the carnival. The investigators met with Michel Meyleu and Gilbert Cibert, co-founders of Les Soufflaculs in 1979, as well as Jean-Louis Dumontet, the association's president. The Soufflaculs of Nontron have been listed in France's Inventory of Intangible Cultural Heritage since 5 July 2010, for "their procession through the town, their Carnival judgment and cremation, and their ritual of circulating breaths". In 2011, the organizing team is also seeking more international recognition, by launching a procedure for inscription on UNESCO's World Intangible cultural heritage List.

In 2011, despite its recent recognition in the Inventaire du patrimoine culturel immatériel (inventory of intangible cultural heritage), enabling it to obtain subsidies from the Regional Council of Aquitaine, among others, the association that organizes the Soufflaculs is still making a loss, and is still finding it difficult to find the financial backing needed to ensure the festivities continue. In 2012, the Soufflaculs were exceptionally cancelled due to the first round of presidential elections. In 2013, the event was not repeated, due to a lack of volunteer organizers. A new team of volunteers took over, and the Soufflaculs were organized in 2014 and 2016 – the last editions to date in Nontron, while the commune of Saint-Claude (Jura) continued the festivities in 2018.

== Description of recent festivities ==
Until 2016, the Soufflaculs de Nontron were held every two years. On Saturday evening, the eve of the festivities, a large banquet is prepared by the organizers at the Nontron village hall. It features an orchestra, group games, the election of Miss Soufflette (who accompanies Bufador the following day) and a ball.

On a Sunday in April, between 200 and 300 Soufflaculs gather at 2 pm in front of the village hall. They're dressed in long white nightgowns, white cotton nightcaps, clogs (often red), their faces covered with false noses, masks or flour, or even smeared with black smoke. They march down the street, one behind the other, carrying a bellows. Each participant places the bellows on the buttocks of the person in front of them and sings in Occitan: "E bufa s'i al cual". Some participants form caterpillars by sewing their nightgowns together.

The festivities revolve around the judgment of the unknown person presented as the king of the festival: "Bufador" (called "Pétassou" or "Carnaval" until 1990, as in the Périgueux carnival). The mannequin symbolizing Bufador takes on a human form. Generally speaking, it's made of a wooden frame, stuffed with straw and filled with firecrackers. He is often decorated, costumed and dressed in the mask of a famous character. The actor who plays his living double is often covered in red make-up, a sign of excessive and regular alcohol consumption.

A character called "Jaurès" (or "Niflant") leads the procession. In the 20th century, the character of Jaurès was played by M. Brousse for thirty years. The character is said to have been named after the politician Jean Jaurès for his imposing moustache and oratorical skills. The Jaurès character is dressed in a top hat, white gloves and a three-piece suit, frock coat or tailcoat. Bufador appears behind him or at the end of the procession, seated or astride a donkey or in an old carriage. Other recurring characters in the crowd include the lazy king "Dagobébert I" on his chariot, transvestites, fake firemen and monks.

The emblematic characters of the Nontron carnival

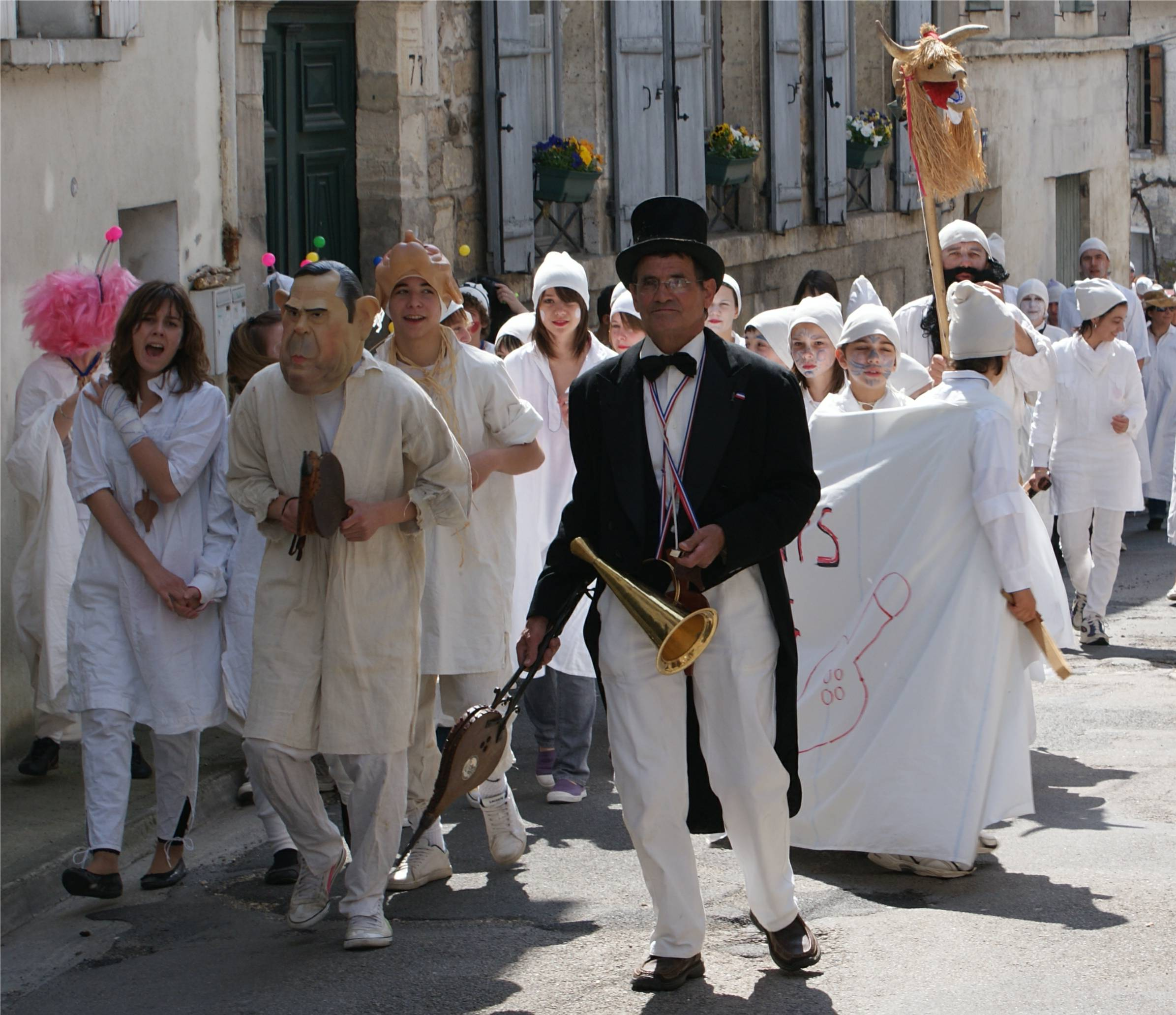
Jaurès, at the head of the procession.

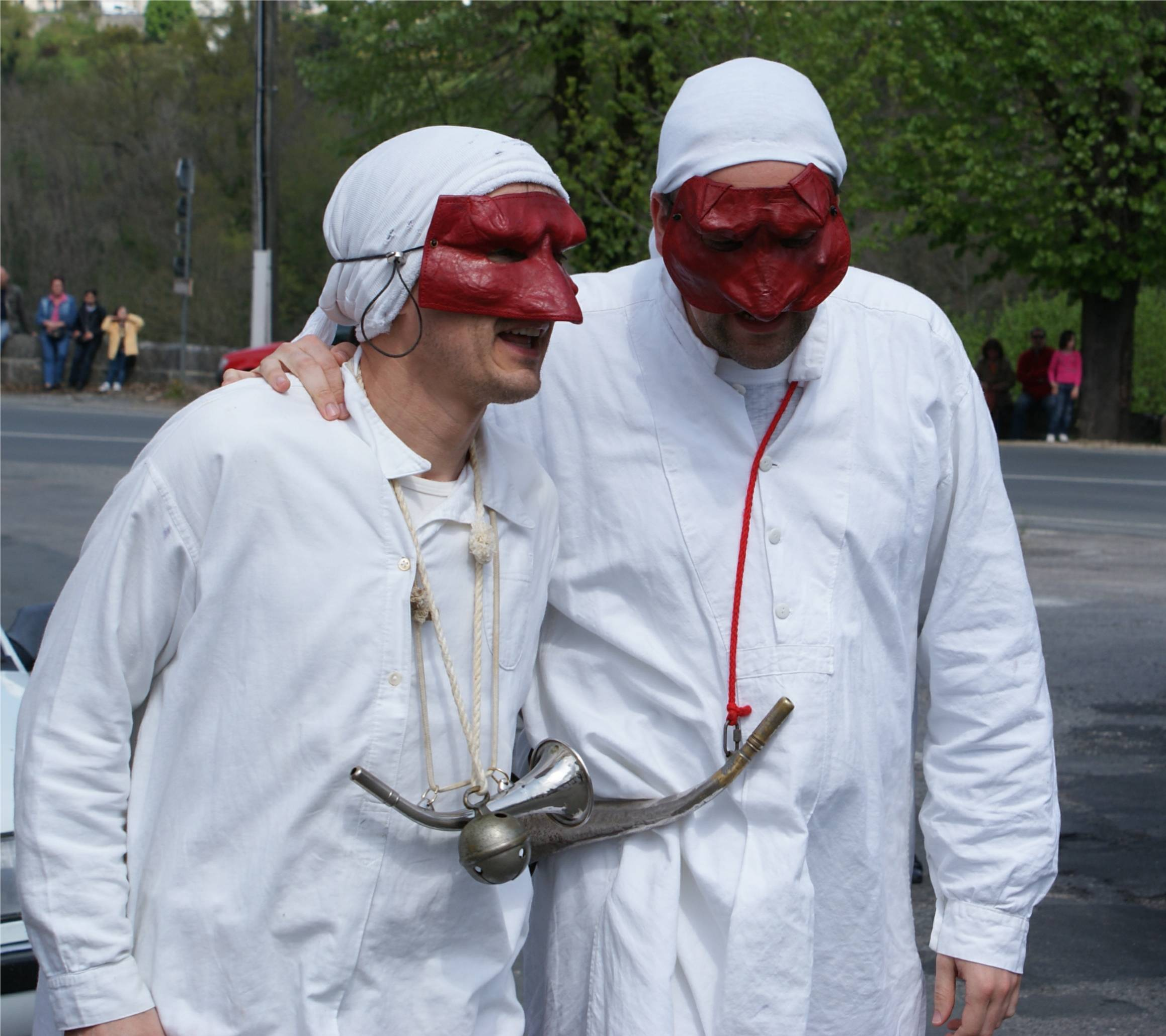
Two Fools.

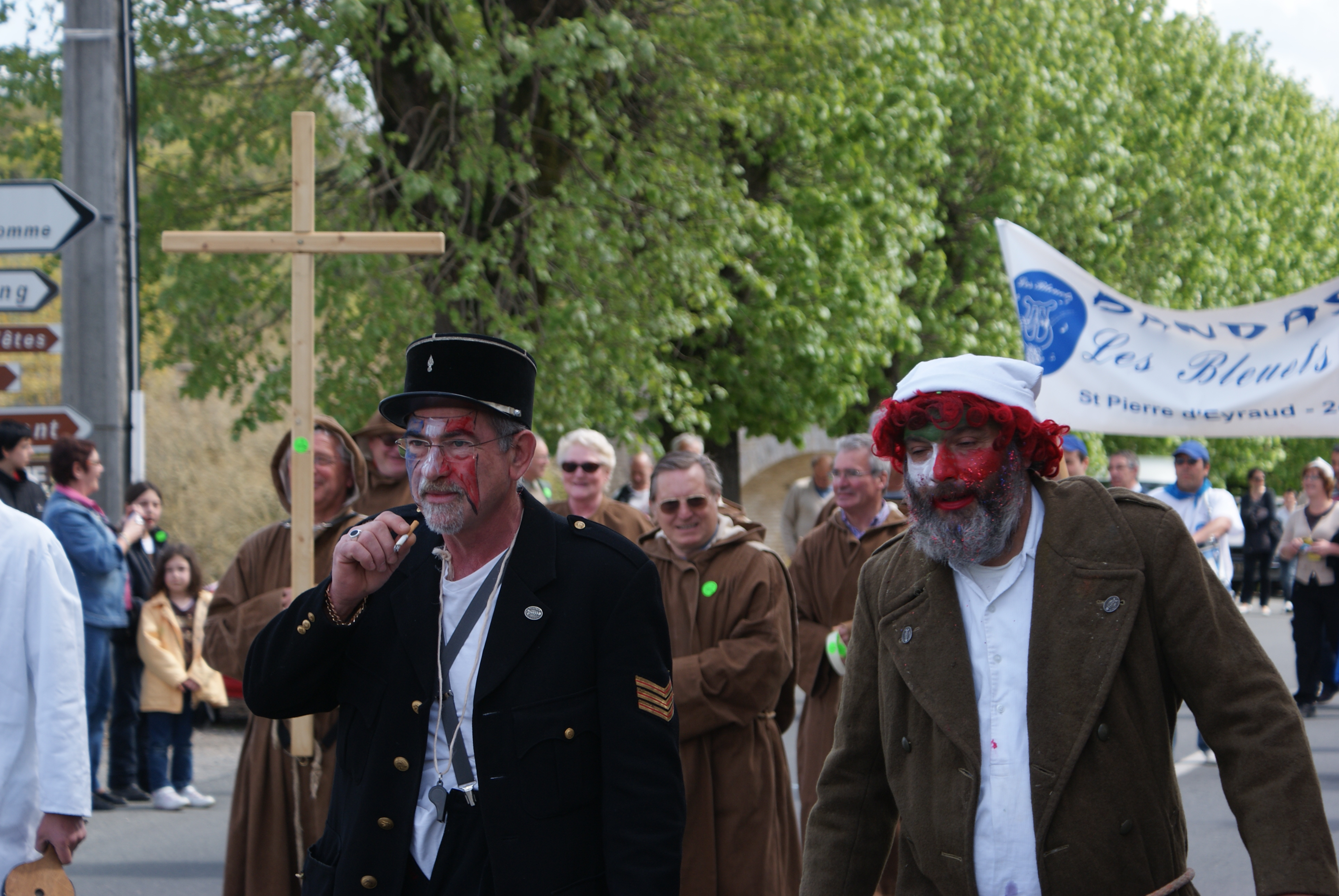
Bufador (right), escorted by a gendarme.

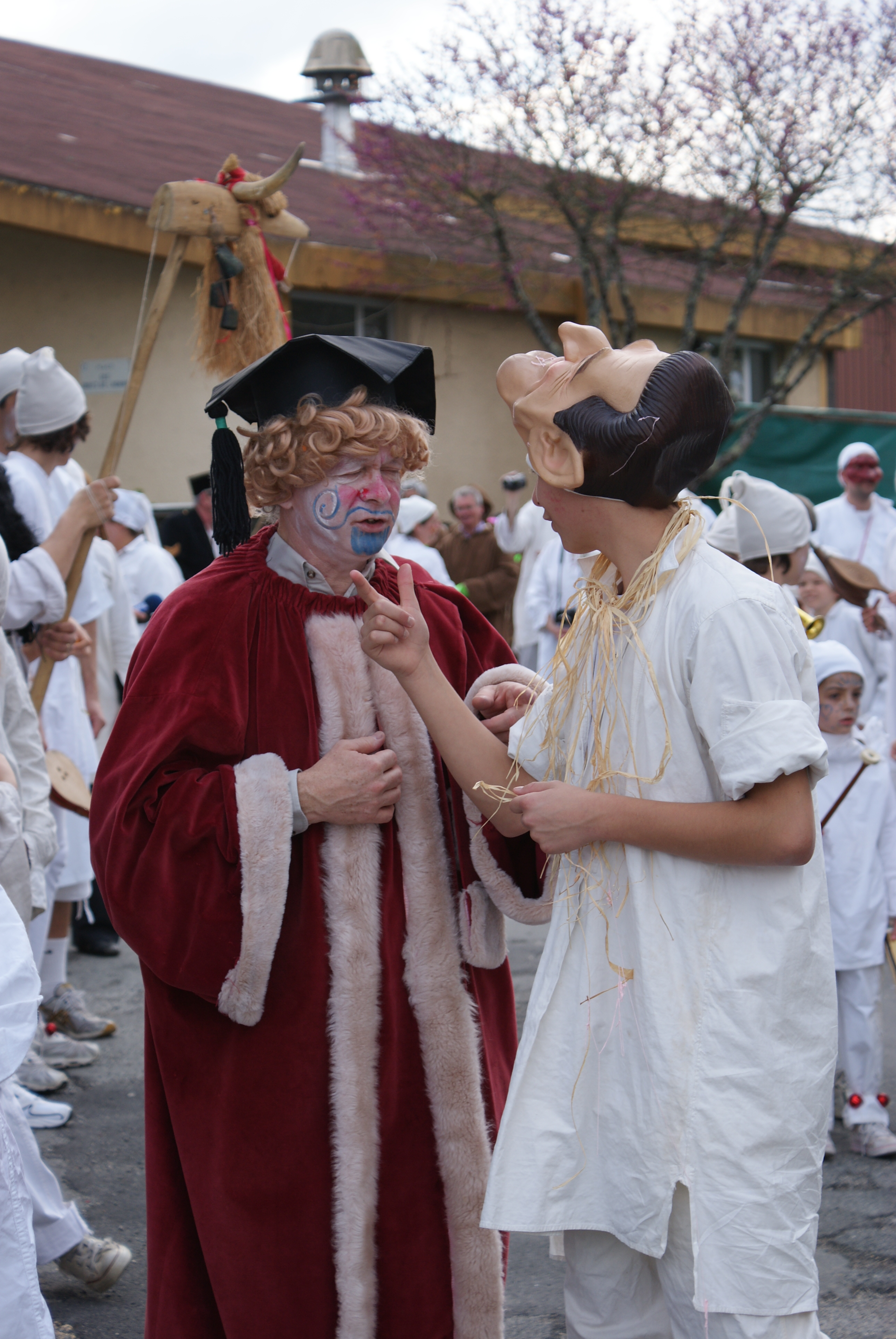
The public prosecutor.

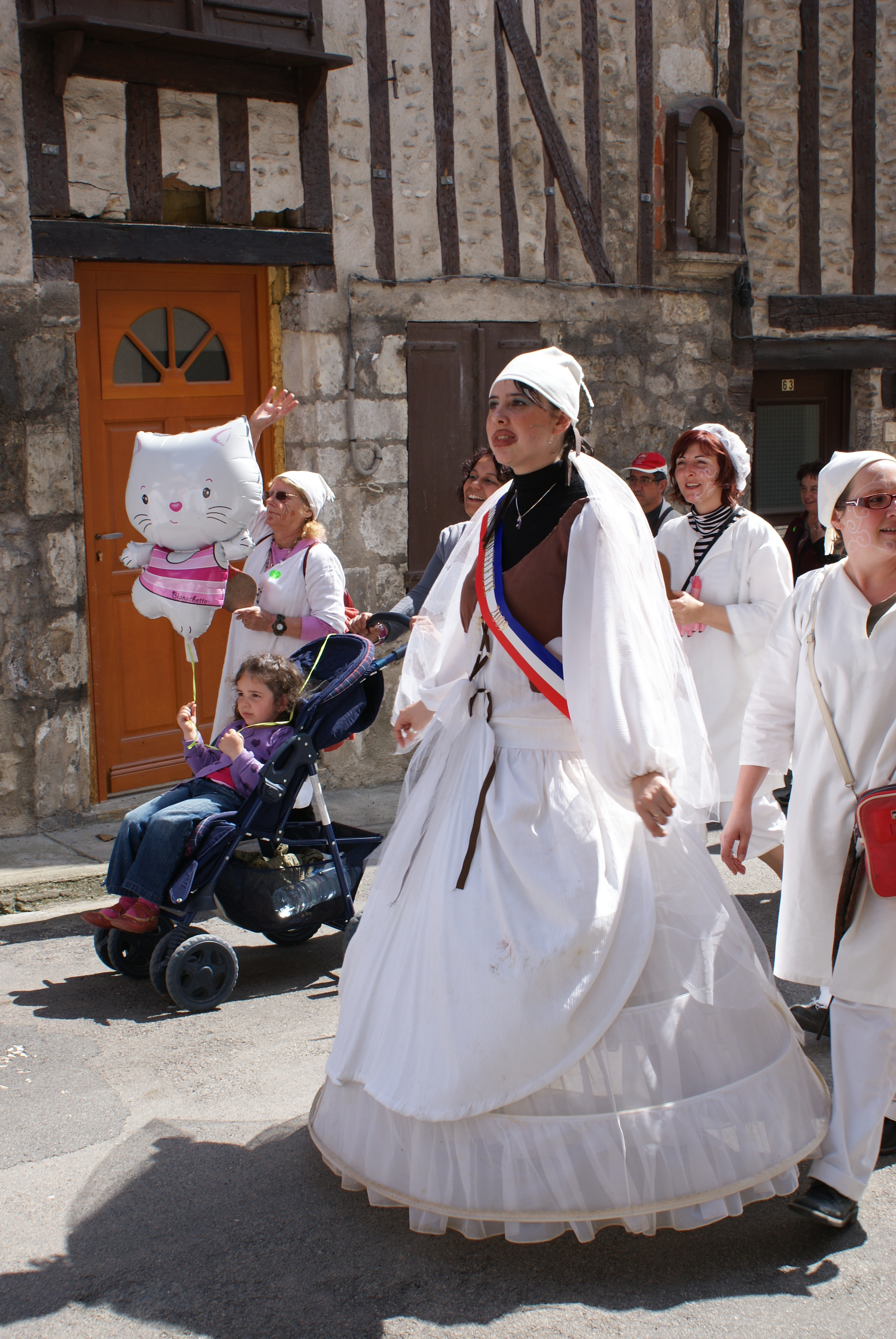
Miss Soufflette.

Using a ladder or a large pole fitted with a begging bowl, a group of Soufflaculs wearing red masks, known as the Fous, enter cafés and climb up to the windows and balconies of Nontronnais to be served wine. Massed on the sidewalks, in the middle of the crowd of spectators, the Soufflaculs regularly perform the Soufflets de Nontron song, accompanied by a banda or street band.

Soufflets de Nontron song

Generally every 100 meters, the Soufflaculs crouch behind each other, with the end of each person's bellows under the buttocks of the person in front. When the whistle blows, everyone has to blow. When the whistle blows again, all the Soufflaculs stand up and continue the procession. Soufflaculs sometimes leave the ranks to "purify" spectators, notably by blowing under women's petticoats.

The procession stops in front of the Nontron town hall for the town's actual mayor (or Jaurès in his absence) to present the most deserving with the "Ordre National des Sardines Valeureuses", considered to be the "supreme distinction of the Soufflaculs de Nontron", above even the Légion d'Honneur. The series of dried, stinking sardines is suspended on a decorated circle. These people are also made members of the "Confrérie des Fous des Soufflets", which organizes the carnival.

Bufador makes his way back through the city to the place of his trial. At this very moment, the mannequin is accompanied by his living double, an actor who plays Bufador as the accused. A courtroom table, surrounded by a public prosecutor, a lawyer and witnesses, is set up in a large square in Nontron. Flanked by two gendarmes, Bufador is charged with all the misdeeds, thefts and crimes perpetrated in the town. The judgment speech, traditionally transmitted orally, is often reworked to reflect current events. The judgment was inspired by Le jugement de Carnaval, a burlesque comedy in prose and verse in one act, written in 1951 by Nontronnais Paul Thibaud.

Once condemned in public, Bufador is put to death and burned on a pyre (often erected on the Place des Droits-de-l'Homme). Soufflaculs form a circle around the pyre and take turns fanning the flames with their bellows, to the collective euphoria. Some salute Bufador's death with a rendition of the popular song Adieu paure Carnava l. In some years, the condemnation takes place under the gaze of "Baboye", a large statue of a Soufflacul in action, a symbol of the Nontron festivities.

Bufador's judgment thus replaces that of the Vieille Bouchée, considered highly obscene. In the Middle Ages, it was the mannequin of this character, also known as the "Dame Roussignole", that was condemned and sawed up in the public square. The people mourned this spectacle, singing: "We saw the old lady, the old lady. We saw the old lady today! Farewell poor grandmother, you die sawed, what a misfortune! So much the better! She was a witch, she deserved it.

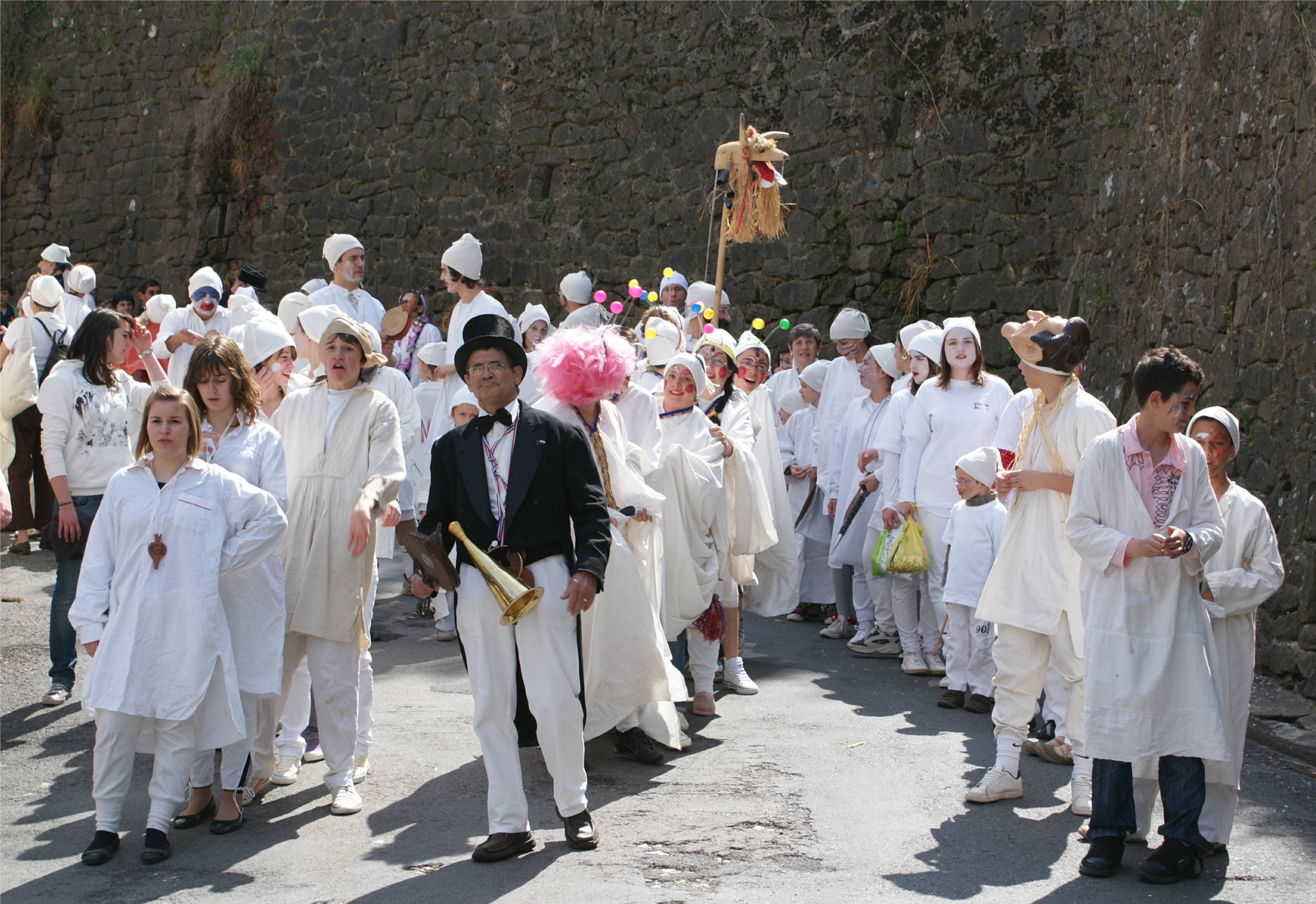
The procession is led by Jaurès

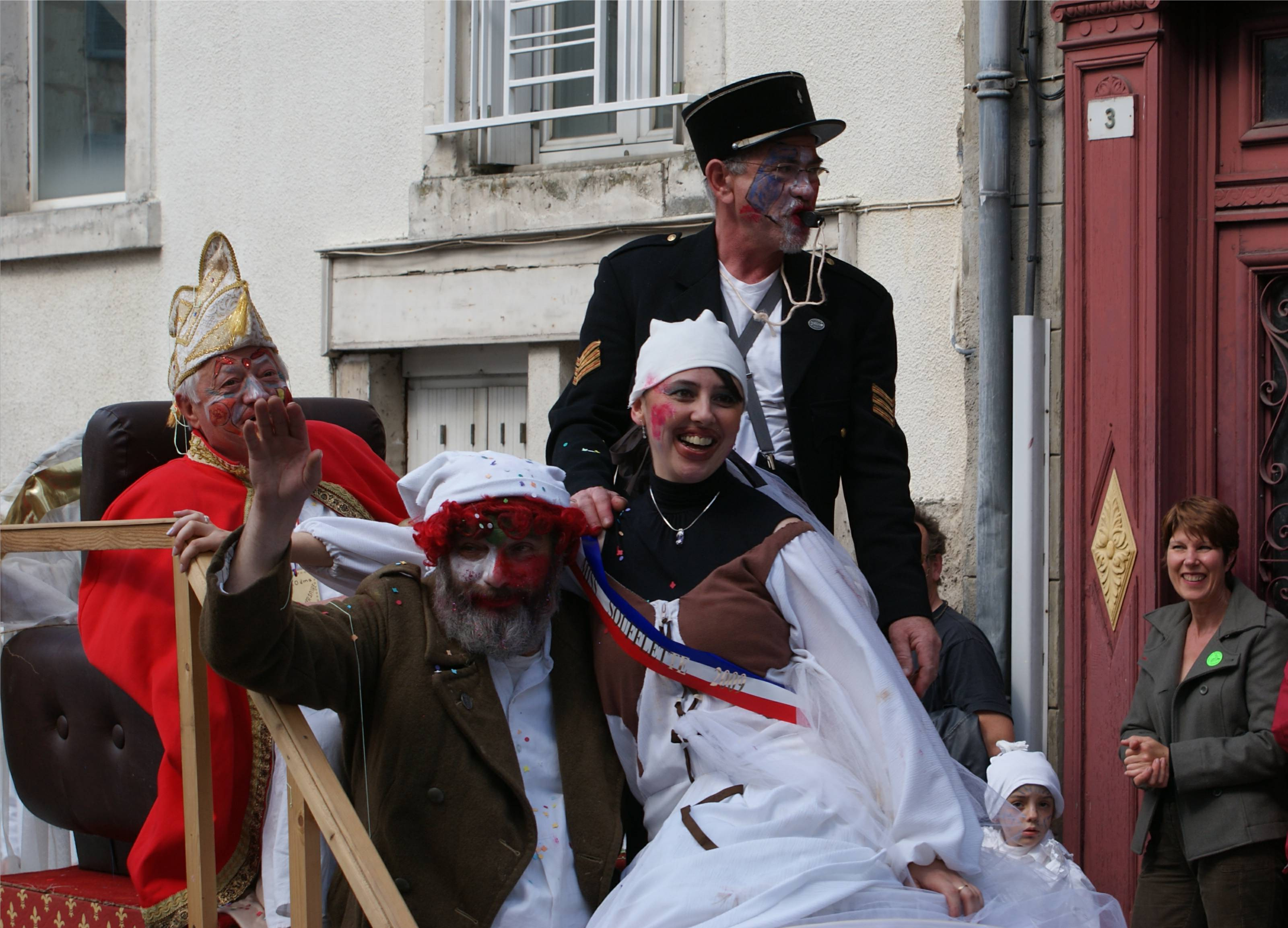
Bufador appears behind in the procession, alongside Miss Soufflette and King Dagobert I.

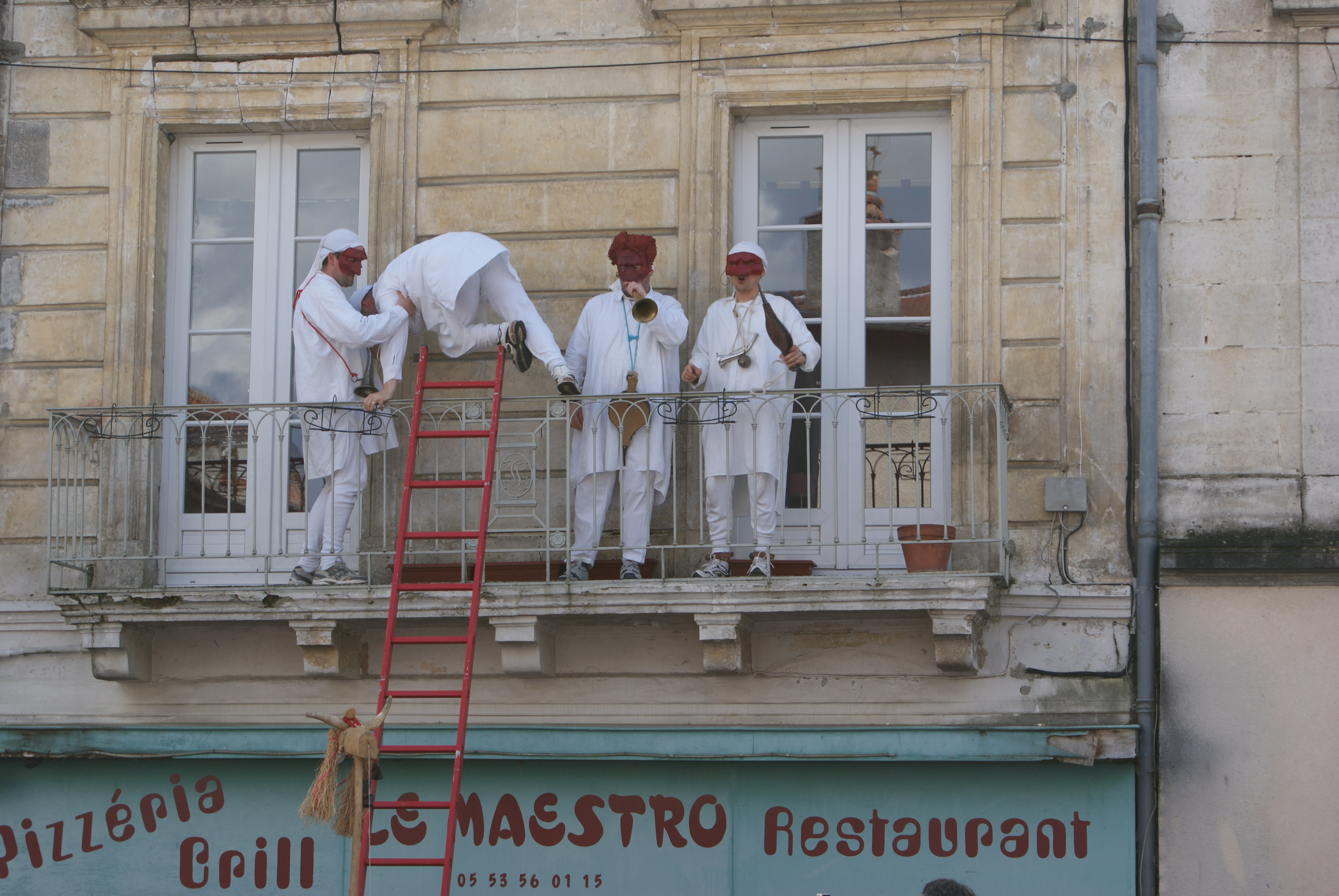
Les Fous climb to Nontronnais' balconies to be served wine.

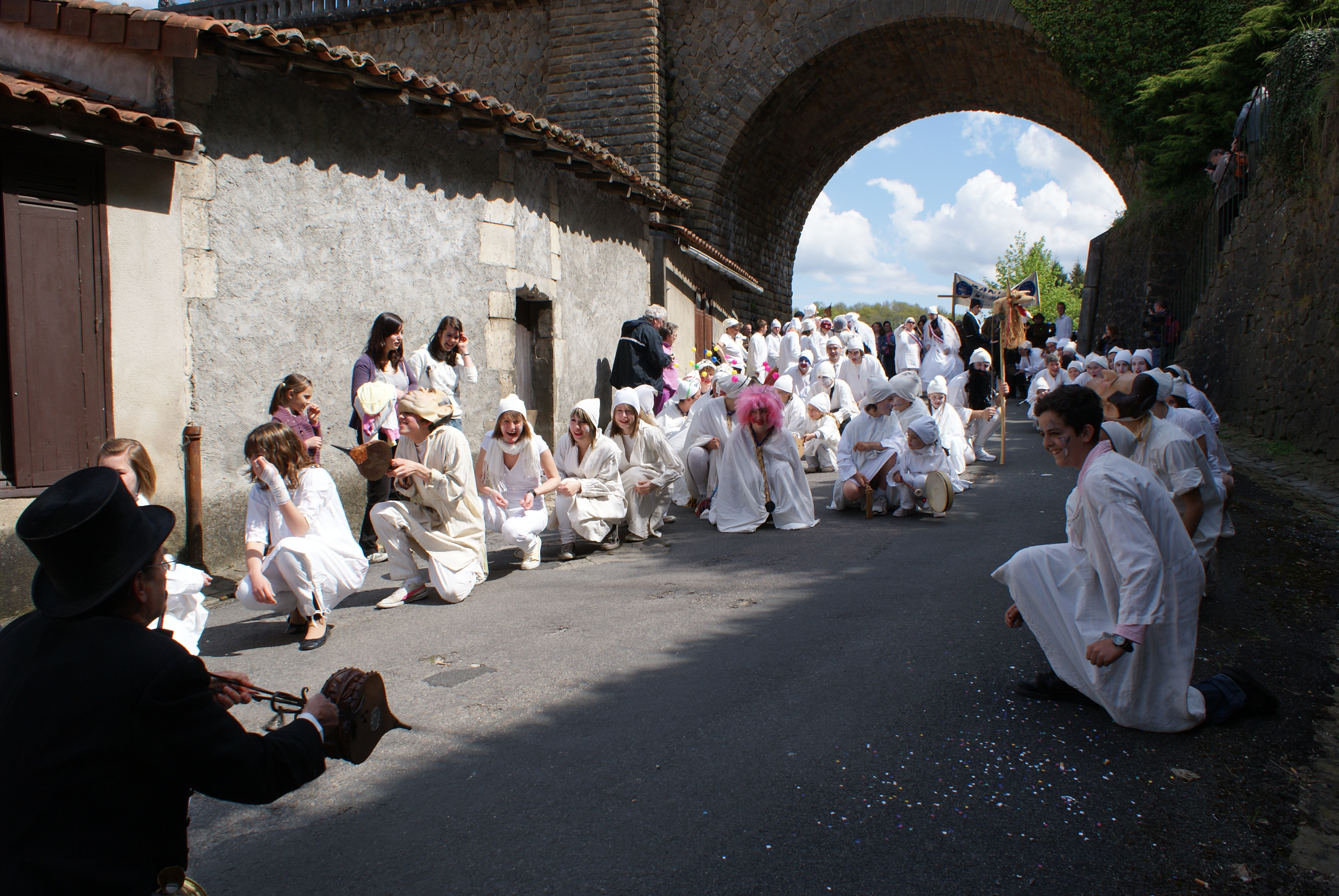
Soufflaculs regularly crouch down to blow their neighbors' butts off.

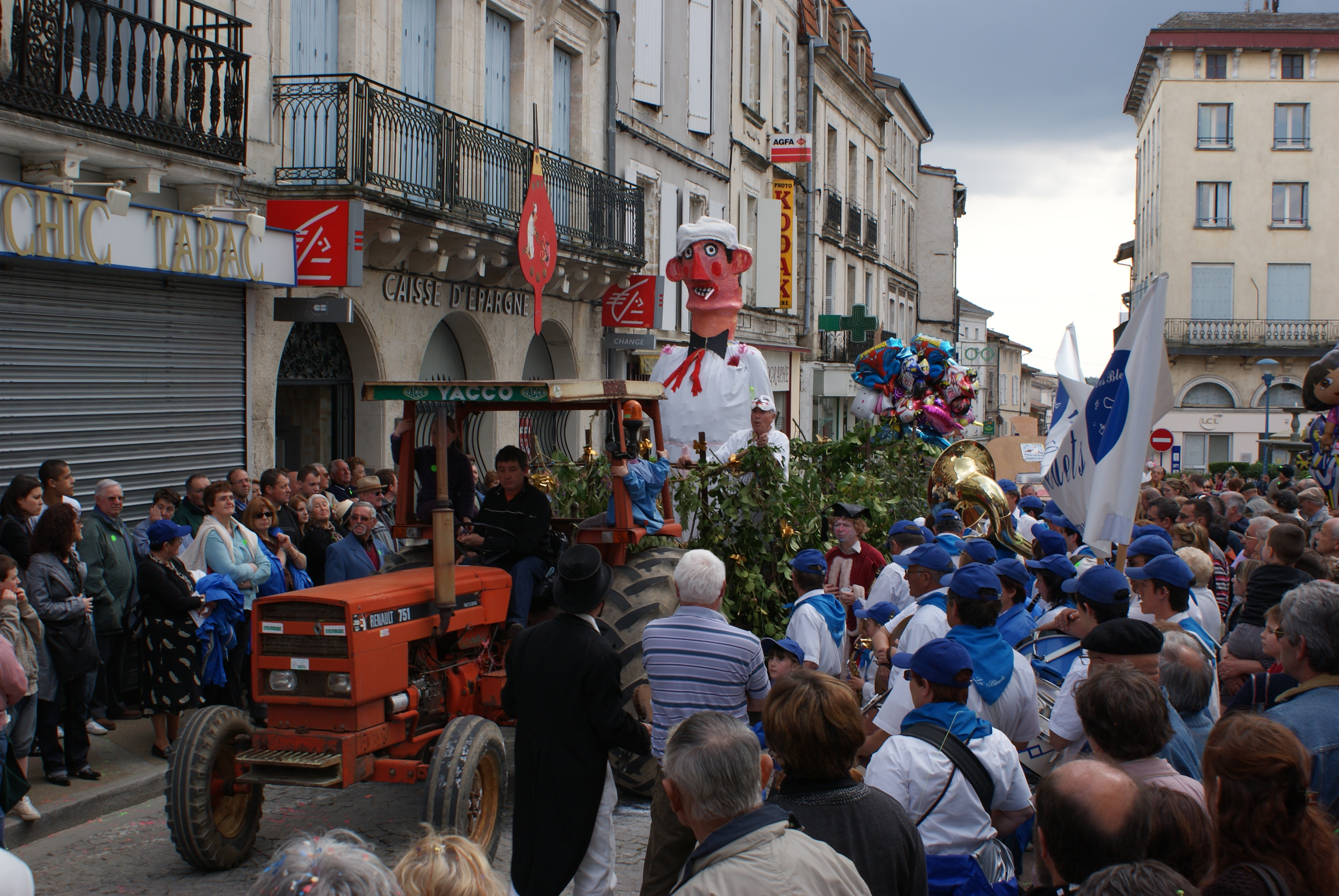
The procession made its way to Nontron town hall.

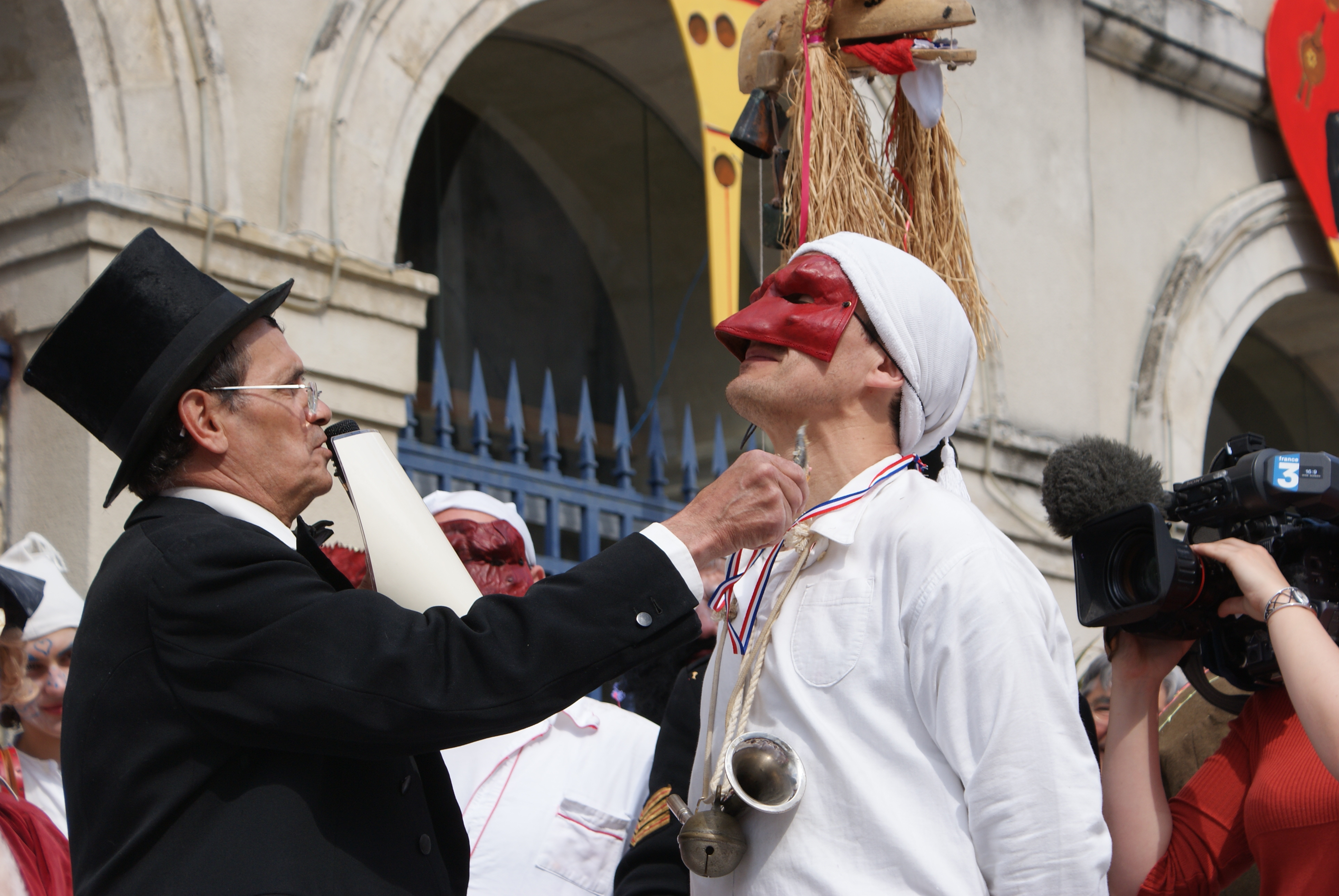
Some are awarded the "Ordre National des Sardines Valeureuses".

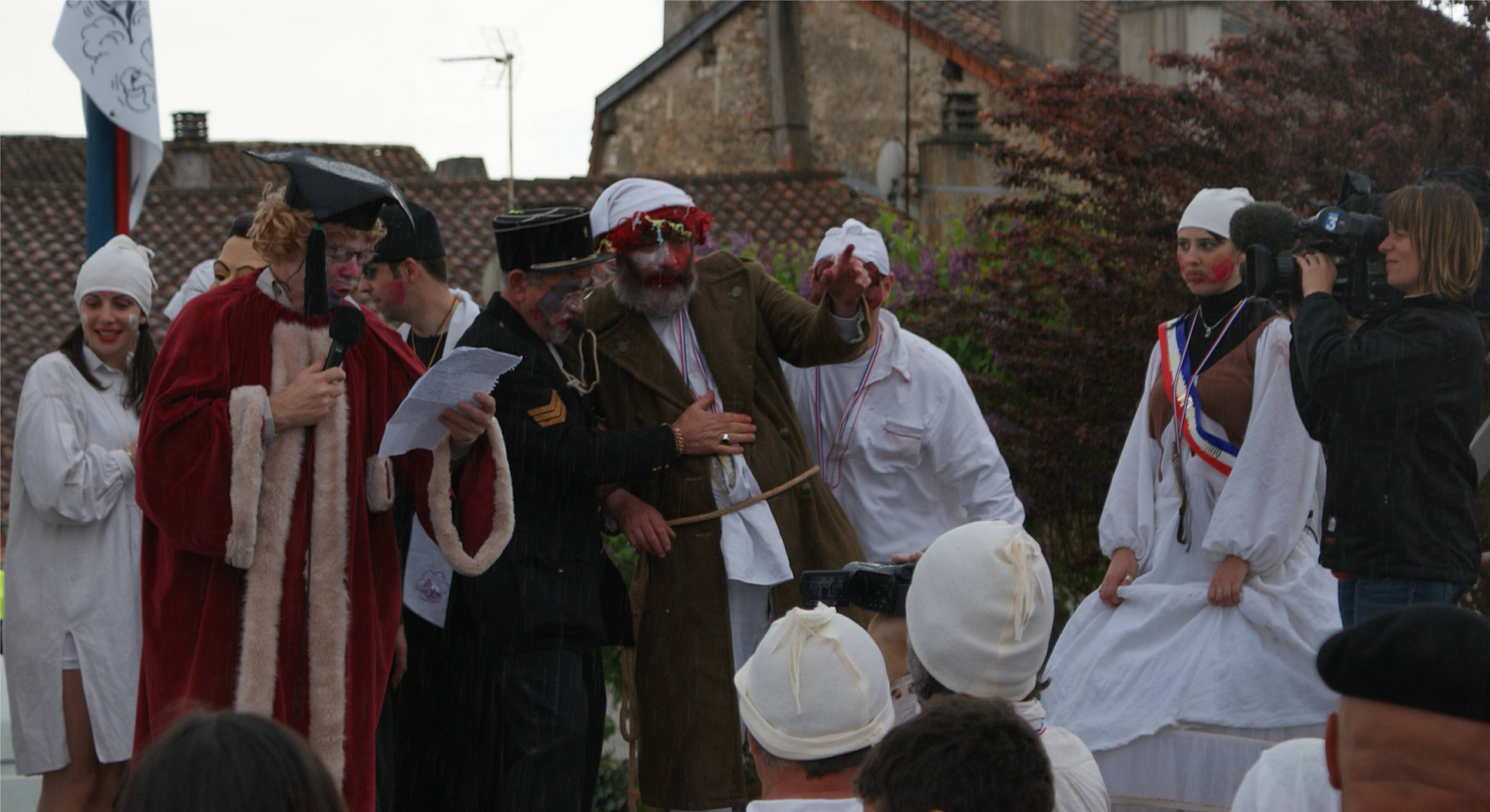
Bufador is tried in public and sentenced to death

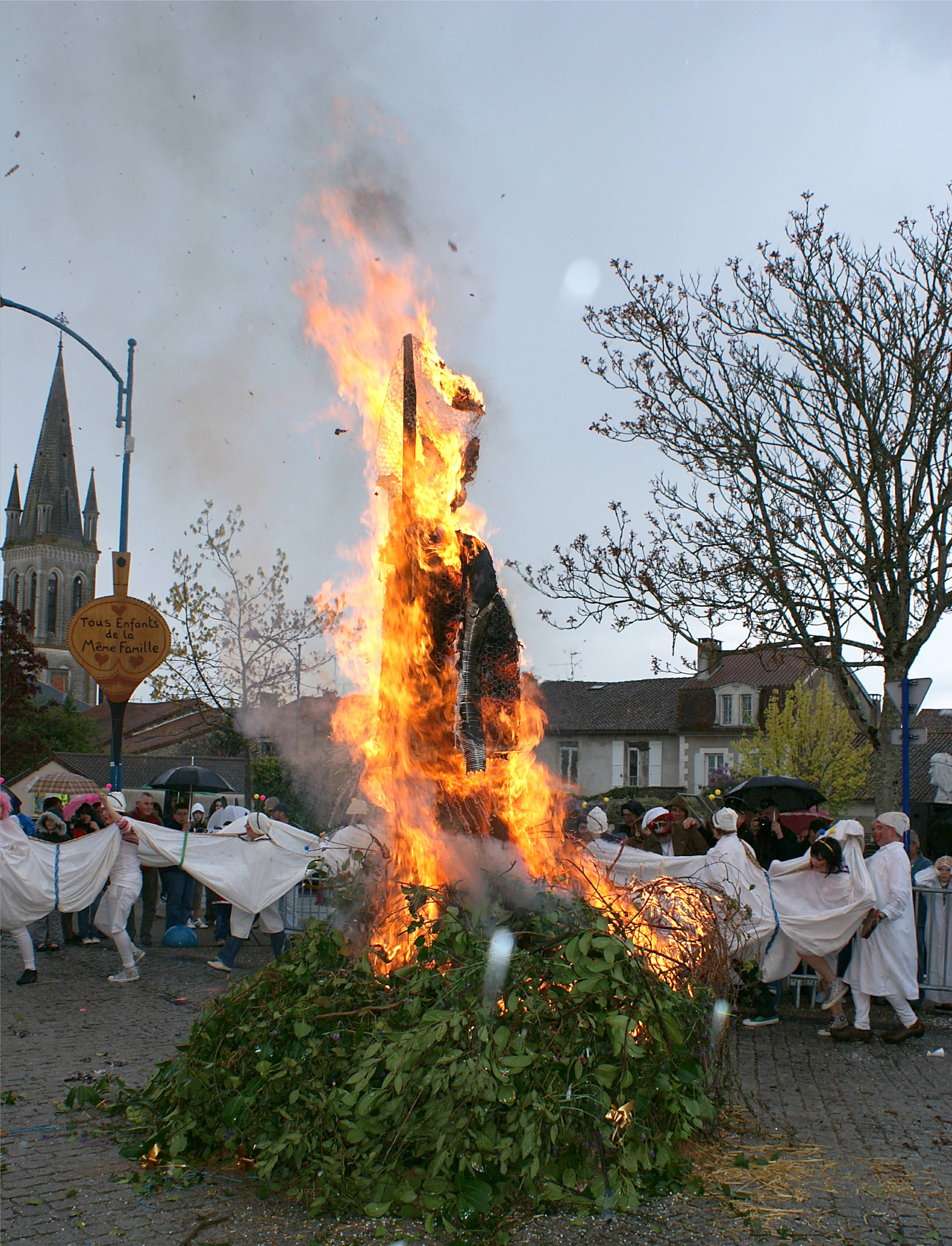
He is burned at the stake.

== Significance ==
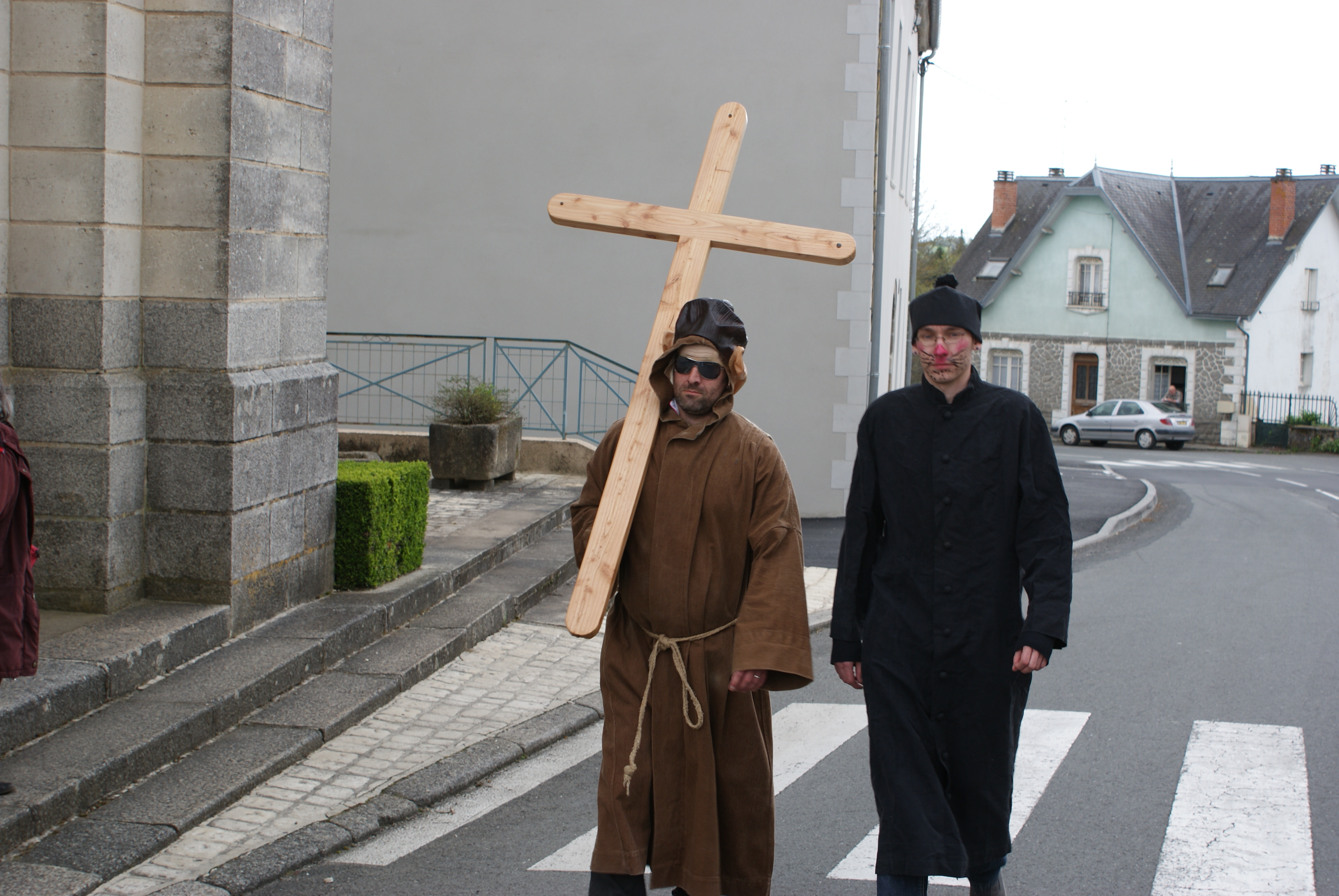
In 2014, two participants dressed up as clergymen.

The few historical records found on the Soufflaculs of Nontron show that they occupy a special place in the popular calendar. Citizens indulged in festive excesses before Lent. The idea of this satirical farce is to forget about constraints, taboos (particularly those linked to the body when it comes to anal insufflation), prohibitions, the social institution and the law. Historians compare the Soufflaculs of Nontron to the Fête des Fous, in the sense that these two medieval festivities demonstrate that society was capable of parodying and ridiculing itself for a period of the year, and "ape the rich and powerful of the Church and the Court". Everyone was able to mock the most sacred religious and royal practices and conventions, and exceptionally imagine "a world where the last was first, where fools and serfs became kings", and vice versa. In this sense, ethnologist Christian Magne explains that Soufflaculs are "too universal and unpredictable to be considered a folkloric manifestation". The Soufflaculs are not a passive show; everyone has the opportunity to make the festival their own, to express themselves and have fun. In January 2019, Jean-Noël Cuénod, a correspondent for Mediapart, notably drew a parallel between the fervor of the Soufflaculs and that of the Gilets jaunes in the streets, when Emmanuel Macron had just written his Letter to the French to explain the modalities of the great national debate: "[the letter] from President Macron could only lack breath, unlike the Soufflaculs of Nontron [...], pantless heroes of this festival as annual as it is petulant". In carnival mythology, the bellows are filled with wind, magic and madness. In this sense, the word "soufflet" can be traced back etymologically to the Latin "follis", the origin of "madness". According to legend, the original meaning of the practice was to chase away the Devil with loud blows of the bellows, as the monks of Saint-Sauveur did in their abbey on the site of today's central pharmacy, Place Alfred-Agard in Nontron. Bellows seem to be a remedy against Satan and sin. What's more, the song Les Soufflets de Nontron indicates that the bellows are also a means of strengthening village ties: "We're all children of the same family, our father was a bellows maker"; the town of Nontron is a family whose family link is the bellows.

The Bufador character embodies the unity of a community. The incredible stories attributed to him are based on real events, from which only the comical, caricatural, parodic or ridiculous aspects are extracted. Through Bufador's judgment, everyone unconsciously takes the opportunity to stigmatize him, whether as a cuckolded husband, a mean-spirited person, a member of the clergy or an overambitious politician. Bufador's expeditious judgment is a criticism of an over-hasty justice system, which is often called into question for this very reason.

Jaurès seems to be the antinomian character of Les Soufflaculs. According to Christian Magne, he represents the "leader", the "man of authority", and symbolizes rigor in the midst of carnivalesque disorder.

== Local beliefs and legends ==
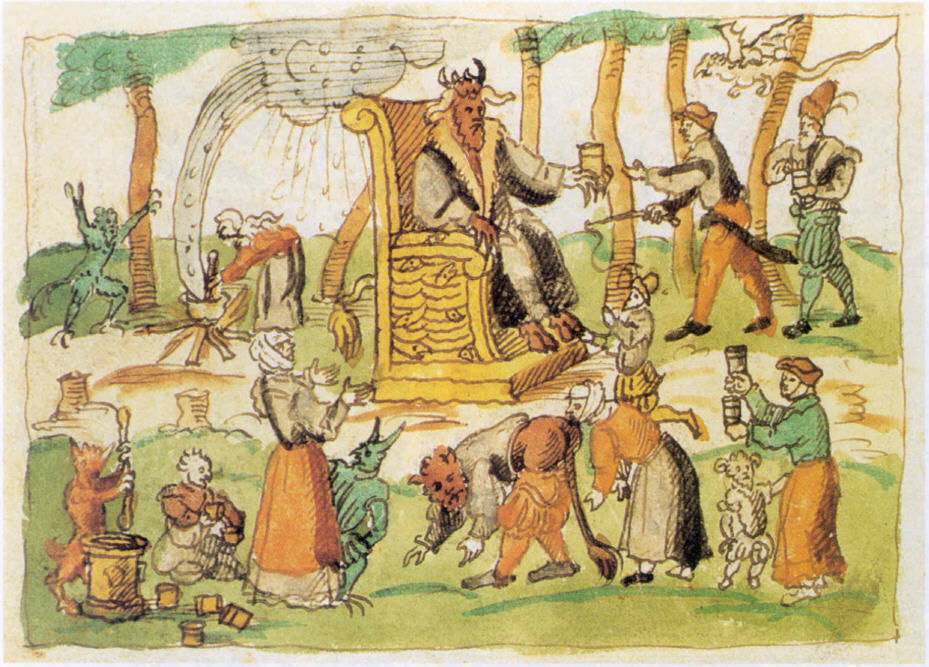
Johann Jakob Wick's chronicle (16th century) depicts the Sabbath ceremony.

In Périgord, and particularly in Nontron, the carnival period is the subject of several beliefs. One of these is that it seems to be a good time to get rid of pests, including fleas, spiders, cockroaches, moles and midges. Another belief is to perform a few fertility rituals during the carnival period, to improve crop yields and make livestock prosper: spoonfuls of broth are thrown into the cowshed before breakfast; a flat bone is placed on the head of the oldest cow; no eggs are broken on carnival day; the best pancake of the period is reserved for the hens, in order to multiply their laying; a shot is fired on carnival night

According to local legends, the Devil takes part in the festivities. Having also gone to excess on Carnival Day, that same evening he becomes master of ceremonies at the Sabbat, a witchcraft gathering of his servants – witches and werewolves – in an abandoned glade. He is personified as a grinning, tortured man holding a pitchfork in his hand, or as a goat with large horns and a tail. This belief reminds citizens that, the day after Carnival, the Devil is always present and will not tolerate any faux-pas.

A number of weather lores are also formulated in Occitan to link the carnival period with weather forecasts.

"If it rains on Carnival day, year of buckwheat."

"If it rains for Carnival, it's a year of nuts.

"If it rains for Carnival, good year for walnuts."

"On Carnival day, if the hawthorn drips, there'll be buckwheat."

"We've never seen a Mardi-Gras outside of a February new moon."

"February moon brings Mardi-Gras."

== Bibliography ==
- Magne, Christian (1992). Le Carnaval en Périgord, vol. 1 : La fête en Périgord. Le Bugue: PLB Éditions. ISBN 978-2-8695-2039-4. ISSN 0989-6422.

== See also ==
- Nouvelle-Aquitaine
- Eugène Le Roy
- Nontron
