= Cul-de-lampe =

A Cul-de-lampe is

- in architecture, a weight bearing piece jutting from a wall; see Corbel
- in typographic illustration, a graphical tail piece: see Cul-de-lampe (typography)
