= Royal Almanac =

French administrative directory

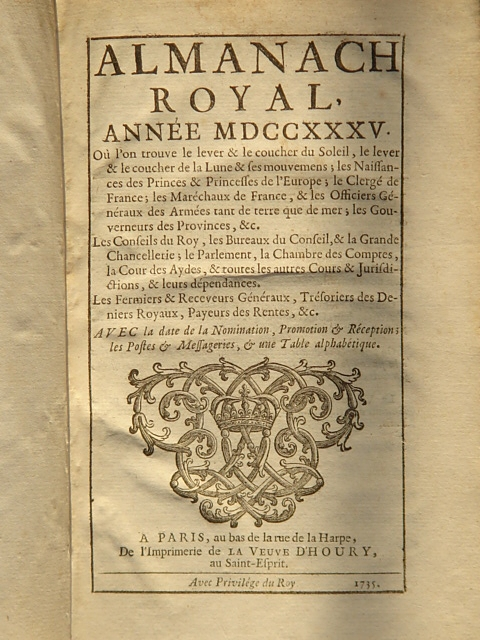
Frontispiece, Royal Almanac, 1735

The Royal Almanac (French: Almanach royal) was a French administrative directory founded in 1683 by the bookseller Laurent d'Houry, which appeared under this title from 1700 to 1792, and other titles until 1919.

Each year the Alamanc presented, in the official order of precedence, the list of members of the royal family of France, the princes of blood, and the main body of the kingdom: great crown officers, senior clerics, abbots of large abbeys (with income of each abbey), marshals of France, colonels and general officers, ambassadors and consuls of France, presidents of the main courts, state councilors, and bankers.

Despite the fact that it consisted of a series of supposed lists, the publication enjoyed a wide circulation with a readership consisting primarily of financiers, politicians, and all persons who had an interest in knowing the administrative organization of France.

Although its edition was due to the action of a private publisher, being included in the lists of the Royal Almanac had an air of legitimacy and abuse was therefore punished. Consequently, a Poitevin, Pierre Joly, was interned in the Bastille at the end of the eighteenth century due to having seized the banking profession by having himself registered as a Poitevin in the Almanac.

The regular edition was in the 8vo format with a leather publisher's binding adorned with a sprinkling of golden fleur de lys.

== History ==
=== Founded at the request of the king ===
Laurent d'Houry, a book binder and publisher, first envisioned a calendar, or Almanac, in 1683. The first edition contained only a few pages with a calendar and omens for the coming year. The last edition in this form, published in 1699, already shows some lists that foreshadow the upcoming Royal Almanac. Thus, we find lists of counselors of state with their ordinary homes, the commissioners of the Board, auditors general and stewards of finances, the Chancellor, archbishops and bishops of France, universities, the list of major exhibitions, sessions of the courts of Paris and the log of the Palace, and finally the addresses of messengers and post offices with indication of departure days.

In 1699, Louis XIV asked that the author describe his work in detail. His widow explained this work's beginnings as follows:

"Louis XIV, who wanted this glorious memory Almanac, made him ask the author, who had the honor to present to Her Majesty's what induced him to give the title of Royal Almanac, and to make it his principal occupation of this work. "

The same year, Louis Tribouillet, chaplain of the king and canon of Meaux, published the State of France. This book describes in detail the functioning of the Court of the King, all his ministers, the treatments they receive, and the various expenses of the state and clergy.

The first edition of the Almanac Royal appeared in 1700, at the same time as another book, Calendar of the Court, which was printed by John Colombat, one of the printers of the king. Parisians had a choice between three books with similar content: Houry's Almanach Royal, Colombat 's Calendar of the Court, and Tribouillet's State of France. At that time, the court around Louis XIV was highly structured, and since the expansion of the Palace of Versailles in 1684, it had continued to grow. In this context, recognition of peers was a valuable asset. The multiplicity of these publications showed the king's desire to "officially" refer his courtiers to positions created to keep them at his side at Versailles, and maintain jealousies between each other.

Even if the king gave his approval, publishing such a book was not without risk. In December 1708, Laurent d'Houry was being prosecuted for having established a printing press in his home and was forced to sell the equipment two months later. Then, in February 1716, he was imprisoned in the Bastille on complaint of the Earl of Stair, the British Ambassador, "to have been disrespectful in his almanac towards King George for not naming him as king of England, or rather of Great Britain", and mentioning the king as son of Jacques II Stuart, exiled to St. Germain.

=== Affirmation of a monopoly ===
The Almanac and the Royal Court Calendar coexist peacefully for ten years and are highly profitable for their authors, but from 1710, Laurent d'Houry integrates more and more topics similar to those in Colombat's work. The conflict starts in 1717 when Houry releases his Abridged Almanac that follows the format of the Calendar of the Court and, simultaneously, files a lawsuit against his competitor. A Judgement of Solomon was made: Houry was now forbidden to continue the publication of his Abridged Almanac and from counterfeiting the Court Calendar. Meanwhile, Colombat was obliged to freeze the format of his calendar and was forbidden from expanding its content. This stops any development of the calendar of the Court, leaving the way open to the Almanac.

Upon the death of Laurent d'Houry in 1725, his family was destitute. Revenues from sales of the Almanac were not sufficient to cover the expenses of printing and bookselling. In these circumstances, his widow, Elizabeth Dubois, took over the business. Their son Charles-Maurice, who had, until then been a mere proofreader of the Almanac, was trying to dismiss his mother and filed a lawsuit against her. He prepared the 1726 edition, but a ruling forbade him from publishing it in his name alone. The ruling of 11 December 1726 forbade him from disturbing the affairs of his mother and from participating directly or indirectly in the development of the Almanac. That is why Charles-Maurice is mentioned as editor of the Almanac in the edition of 1726.

In 1731, Elizabeth Dubois filed a new lawsuit against Colobat, who had expanded the Court Calendar despite the ruling in 1717 that prohibited him from doing so. Unsuccessful, she resumed the publication of the Abridged Almanac, and Colombat files a complaint in turn. She agrees to abandon the publication of the Abridged Almanac "if Colombat returns to the 1718 format." The disputes became extinct with the death of the parties.

With the privilege of the Almanac being about to expire, Charles-Maurice d'Houry tried one last time to seize it, but a royal letter on March 27, 1744 confirmed definitively André-François Le Breton as sole owner of the rights.

== A family of hegemony 131 years ==
=== Directorate of André Le Breton ===
In 1728, d'Houry's widow joined hands with her grandson André-François Le Breton, who was 18 years old at the time and an orphan under the guardianship of Charles-Maurice d'Houry. André-François had inherited, according to the will of the estate of Laurent Houry, half of the rights of the Almanac, and his widow having inherited the rest.

Under his leadership, the Almanac takes a new breath and adds new sections, which sometimes does not go without difficulties. For example, in 1768, Voltaire sent him an incendiary letter:

"I say as much to Le Breton, the Royal Almanach's printer: I will not pay him a dime for the Almanac he sold me this year. He had the rudeness to say that Mr. President... Mr. advisor..., lives in the cul-de-sac to Menard, in the cul-de-sac of the White Coats in the ass -de-sac de l'Orangerie. (. . .) How can you say that president lives in an ass?"

In 1773, Le Breton moved his print shop in a wing of the former Hotel d'Alegre, at 13 rue de Hautefeuille, which he acquired from William Louis Joly de Fleury and was previously occupied by the Portuguese Ambassador.

In the late eighteenth century, the weather was bad, and so were the wheat harvests. The price of this staple food increases disproportionately. At the time, a rumour was circulating that the government had a monopoly on wheat, thus perpetuating the high cost of this staple. This rumour became official when, in his edition of 1774, Le Breton accidentally added a "Treasurer of grain on behalf of the King" in the person of Sr. Mirlavaud. The edition of the Almanac had been proofread and approved by the Chancellor, but he was still sentenced to close his shop for three months and publish a revised edition, without the line in question.

In 1777, Le Breton was again being accused of inserting information seen as treasonous. It has, according to its critics, cited "Fleuri & les Polissons de Vergès & de Vaucresson", among the prosecutors and attorneys general of the Parlement of Paris, despite these being people who had been involved in a reform of parliament made by Maupeou against the venality of Parliament desired by Louis XV, but annulled by Louis XVI. In rebuke, Le Breton was made to cancel this section on any of the Almanacs that had not yet been sold, and to replace at no cost, the litigious Almanac issues of those who so request it.

Le Breton died on October 4, 1779 and his cousin, Charles-Laurent Houry, son of Charles-Maurice d'Houry, took over the business.

=== French Revolution ===
The privilege granted to the family of Houry for the Almanac was threatened in 1789 when Camille Desmoulins, in his speech at the Lantern to the Parisians, said he would cease in favour of Baldwin, another Parisian publisher. This threat was not brought into effect since ownership of the Almanac remained with Houry.

=== Last generation Houry ===
Following the death of Joan Nera, widow of Laurent-Charles Houry, publication of the Almanac was taken over by Jean-François-Noël Debure, husband of their daughter, Anne-Charlotte d'Houry. Debure was from a prominent and wealthy family of Parisian booksellers, especially allied with the Didot family. He has been a printer since 1784 with the title of printer to the Duke of Orleans.

Debure took over the printing of the family of Houry for a time, but his other businesses faced hardships, and he was forced to file for bankruptcy. To keep the property inherited from her family, Anne-Charlotte d'Houry initiated separation proceedings. In November 1791, the bankruptcy was declared, and she fought the creditors to preserve her inheritance. This opposition was ultimately futile, and a ruling allowed creditors to seize her belongings, but that does not appear to have been necessary due to a following decision allowing her to recover property that creditors had not taken from her husband.

Francois-Jean-Noel Debure died in 1802 in Loiret.

Stephen Lawrence Testu worked as a clerk in the Debure family home since 1788, and had gradually won the confidence of the household. Because of the absence of Mr. Debure, Anne-Charlotte was left alone with her two sons. Despite their age difference, he was 20 years younger than her; she married Testu in July 1795. Testu highlights his knowledge in the profession to convince her to transfer the management of printing to him. She accepted in 1797 and offered him priority over the rights of the Almanac in exchange for a perpetual annuity of 800 francs, and subsequently completely abandoned the Almanac. This influx of money appears to get to Testu's head, who indulges in gambling and develops a taste for the easy life. He neglects the direction of his establishment and constantly runs out of money. He takes on many loans, which gradually ruin his business. Relations were strained with his wife because he left the marital home in September 1801, and the only ties that bind the couple were the result of the multiple lawsuits they initiated against each other.

In 1810, Testu secretly sold the rights of the Almanac to Guyot, with whom he partnered. Anne-Charlotte d'Houry opposes this sale, who saw it as theft, but lost the case in 1812. In return, she got a pension of 1200 francs, which Testu failed to pay. Indeed, a decree in 1820 declared him in debt of more than 90000 francs. In 1814, due to the large sums invested by Guyot in the case, a legal order confirmed him to be the owner of the Almanac. Testu still obtains from Guyot the repayment of his debts and a life annuity of 2400 francs.

Guyot pushed Testu away from his business in 1820 and stopped paying his annuity. The latter, again running out of money, turned against his wife in 1823, demanding that she return to the marital home and pay all household expenses, or pay him an annuity of 6000 francs. Judges dismissed Testu's claim for the marital home, since he himself had deserted it 22 years earlier and has no housing to offer his wife, even though she already lives in a very beautiful home, but still requires his wife, who was very rich, to pay him a pension of 1,800 francs by invoking the solidarity between spouses.

The hegemony of the family of Houry on the Almanac established in 1683 finally ceased in 1814 when, by order, the company was transferred to the association Guyot-Testu. Anne-Charlotte d'Houry died on July 22, 1828, aged 83 years.

=== Judgement of publishing ===
The 1867 edition of the Almanac was transferred to the widow Berger-Levrault, who already published the Diplomatic yearbook of the French empire, and Military Yearbook of the French empire, both published like the Almanac based on documents provided by the administration.

The publishing of the Almanac stops definitively in 1919 after four years of interruption due to war; the latter number compiles the years 1915 to 1919. The reasons that prompted the shutdown of publication cannot be found in the literature, but it can be assumed that the combination of the very large volume of the book (more than 1650 pages in 1900) and the hard times that the French economy and politics were going through at that time made the management of such a volume of information extremely complex and unprofitable for the publisher. It is also possible that the new government formed after the elections of 1919 no longer supported the development of the Almanac.

== Changing content ==
=== The topics in the Almanac ===
The Almanac or Calendar, as it was called in its early editions, was just a simple calendar to which were associated topics on astronomical events, the days of fairs, the newspaper of the Palace, the residence of messengers, the departure of mail, the price of currencies and the list of collectors' offices. After its presentation to the king in 1699, many items were constantly being added, including the clergy, the royal family of France, then the families of other sovereign nations, officers, ambassadors, etc.

In 1705, Houry added the list of knights of the Holy Spirit and peer and marshal of France. In 1707, he added the state of the clergy and, in 1712, the birth of kings, princes and princesses of Europe. After the death of Louis XIV, the Duke of Orleans, now the Regent, had the members of the House of Orleans added to the list of members of the royal family. Later, on top of his own, he had the full house of the Queen and princes added.

The table of contents of the Almanac takes up ten pages.

The Almanac also stands abreast of scientific advances. In the middle of the eighteenth century, with the improvement in the accuracy of clocks, many wealthy fans began to observe and study the stars. It is indispensable to know the difference between true solar time of sundials and mean solar time clocks, especially since the advent of clock seconds. This is the equation of the pendulum, also called the equation of time. The table was added shortly before 1750.

With the French Revolution, the Almanac changed its title and its content was modified to match the new institutions.

The abolition of all noble distinctions requires an overhaul of the Almanac's topics, the calendar of the vulgar era was replaced by the Republican calendar, the spot reserved for kings and princes of Europe was replaced by a note on the foreign forces friendly to France, the administrative organs of the royal house are replaced by the new ministries.

The content changes again with the reforms of the Consulate and the Empire, the Restoration, the Hundred Days, the July Monarchy, the Second Republic followed the Second Empire and the Third Republic who sees the end of the publication of the Almanac. In each case, the binding of the Almanac was updated with the times.

As the number of entries doesn't cease increasing, the number of pages follows the same trend: they numbered one hundred in 1699, nearly five hundred in 1760, and seven-hundred just before the French Revolution. The thousand page mark was reached in 1840, and exceeds 1,600 pages in 1900. On average, about thirty names are listed per page, the total number of people or places listed annually in the tens of thousands, although there is no table to search for a particular name.

All the editions of the Almanac make it a very useful book for historians that can follow, year after year, ministries and other administrative bodies, movements of people in these offices, and the details of public service organizations for a resident of Paris (such as places of mailboxes, timetables and fares for coaches and royal messengers).

=== Chronology of the 237 years of publishing Almanacs ===
After the death of Laurent d'Houry, his descendants continued his work until 1814. The edition continued until 1919. It would be tedious to describe in words the evolution of the Almanac over the 237 years that have elapsed since the first edition by Laurent d'Houry in 1683, hence the choice of this table layout.

Throughout its existence, the Almanac has crossed eleven political regimes, changed editors fourteen times, and changed the title nine times.

== Publication ==
=== Collecting information ===
Since its inception in 1700, following a royal demand, the Almanac invented by Laurent d'Houry aimed to be an official handbook.

Until the French Revolution, contributors were cordially invited to provide information to the bookseller, as pointed by a note of the printer in the first pages of the Almanac. In 1771, for example, we read in the Historical Journal of the Revolution that the Bar Association, in the person of a certain Gerbier, asserted that "there would be no change in the order of the table, and that it would be printed in the Royal Almanac as it was last year, leaving out only the dead."

With the French Revolution, the order was given to government to provide all information to the publisher. In 1802, Testu even obtained exclusive rights to it.

Later, the collection of information for the Almanac is even part of the operating budget of the ministries and can be seen in an order of December 31, 1844 signed by Louis-Philippe I "on the organization of the Ministry Administration Navy" Article 6 of which list in the items in the budget "the formation of the Royal Almanac".

==== Typography ====
The print quality improved significantly when Laurent d'Houry became the printer. He multiplied the number of bands and cul-de-lampes used to decorate titles and ends of sections. The Almanac is still very minimal in prints because the image was not its goal. The only print that the reader will be able to find are the diagrams explaining the oppositions of the planets and eclipses, present every year, and the map of departments of France from the 1791 and 1792 editions.

Despite the short time to prepare the book, the printer takes care with the presentation and uses, as appropriate, many variations in the size and shape of characters for easy reading of long lists, special characters to emphasize certain lines, compositions tables or columns and groupings in braces.

The more modern nineteenth-century Almanacs benefit from technological advances. The design of characters is modernized and the use of fonts with varied graphics increases, sometimes in excess: we can count at least 7 fonts in 11 different typefaces on the cover page of the National Almanac of 1850 printed by Guyot et Scribe.

Announcements, the ancestors of advertising, are introduced by the publisher Berger-Levrault in the late nineteenth century.

==== Final Page Proof ====
The deadline for submitting this information to the editor was set to the first ten days of October (or November). The last-minute changes are incorporated in an erratum at the end of the book. When they are too large, they may even delay the release. In late December, a proof was sent to the administration for approval of the content. This approval was required before the publication went on sale.

This leaves only two months to integrate the information of the year in the text of the previous edition and call all of the pages before submitting the book for the final page proof. The editing step, at least for the test in 1706, has not been done with great care as can be seen by very many shells and mistakes which have crept into the table of contents presented in thumbnail to the right.

Once the administrative agreement was obtained, it was inserted at the end of the book, the Almanac was stapled or bound and was then distributed to customers at the end of the year.

=== Printing ===
Early Almanacs were not printed by Laurent d'Houry. The Almanac of 1706 was printed by Jacques Vincent, installed Huchette street, at the sign of the Angel. On November 15, 1712, Laurent Houry became printer and immediately began printing his work. From then on, all the almanacs were printed by their publishers.

==== Circulation ====
There is no source detailing the circulation of the Almanac. The only figures available are the annual profits generated by sales.

In 1782, Mercier reported a pension of more than 40 000 francs. Diderot, at the same time, puts the figure at 30,000 pounds. For a price of sale of 5 to 6 pounds, the number of sales must necessarily be greater than about 7,500 almanacs.

Around 1820, during the trials that brought the widow and Debure Testu, the income of the Almanac was estimated between 25 and 30,000 francs. In 1834, another almanac, the Almanac of France, said that its cost is 35 cents for a sale price of 50 cents. Booksellers then purchase the item for 38 cents to resell at a suggested retail price of 50 cents. The publisher earns so 3 cents per pound sold, the bookseller earns 12 (minus shipping costs, dependent). If one considers - arbitrarily - a four-volume Almanac was sold directly into the library Testu (priced at 10 francs 50), the remainder being passed through intermediaries, we can prorate that to generate an annual income of 30,00 francs, Testu must sell approximately 25,000.

In the absence of more precise information, we can only estimate at about 15,000, the number of copies sold per year between the late eighteenth and early nineteenth century.

==== Binding ====
The almanac was sold either stapled or bound by the printer. The paperback version allowed the purchaser to connect his book as he wishes, and so it was possible to find books with bindings very ornate, with lace, coats of arms of families, many colors brightened or gilding Biblio 24, etc.

The bound version of the almanac provided by the printer was usually presented in a bound in calf or Morocco, full, and lilies in the boxes back. With the revolution, the lilies are replaced with Phrygian caps in roundels.

==== Distribution ====
The Almanac was normally available from the bookseller, but it could also be found in the province in other bookstores that serve as intermediaries, for example in 1816, at Pesche, bookseller at Le Mans, or by correspondence through the Sorbonne, as did Voltaire.

=== Readership ===
The Almanac has a very great interest because of the number of subjects it addresses, including the organization of the French administration. In 1785, Mairobert wrote that "the Almanach Royal is in the hands of everyone and is among the Princes, the King's office, the foreign ministers would cater. Louis-Sebastien Mercier, in a pamphlet, the Tableau de Paris that stands in 1782, explains that "Those who are thrown into the paths of ambition, study Almanac Royal with serious attention," "more a beautiful royal consult the almanac to see if her lover is a lieutenant or sergeant, . . ." that everyone was buying the almanac to find out exactly where they stand. "And finally," even Fontenelle said, "that it was the book which contained the greatest truths."

Adages use the almanac as a reference. According to Jean-François de La Harpe is "the only book to read to get rich is the Royal Almanac.", Jean-Joseph Regnault-Warin uses the phrase "having the memory of a Royal Almanac" or the Memoirs of the Academy of hawkers explains that "it is enough to read the Almanac for education."

In the eyes of justice, the book can be used as a basis for comparison: during a police investigation in 1824, a defendant defends himself by explaining that the volume of documents he was accused of having carried "could be equal to that of a royal Almanac or a related trade."

Whether to have a certain level of resources to purchase this item, the customer extended beyond the financial and political world.

== Competition ==
The Royal Almanac is competing at its inception with the Almanac of the Court of Colombat, which cannot make it evolve since 1717. If it essentially describes the royal court and the Parisian institutions, other major cities also have their almanacs, such as the city of Lyon, equally voluminous. The Almanac is, however, considered a reference book.

Since 1717, the Calendar of the Court can not change, its sections are limited to an ephemeris of the celestial motions (30 years) increased by astronomical tables with sky conditions, and timing of the court to the family and royal house, lists of boards, departments and secretaries of state finances, births and deaths of kings, queens, princes and princesses of Europe, the knights of various orders, the archbishops and bishops of the kingdom and Cardinals of the Sacred College.

It is primarily sought for its astronomical calendar.

=== The Almanac of Commerce ===
The Almanac of Business, published by Sébastien Bottin in the eighteenth century contains, besides the addresses of shops in Paris, many useful statistics financiers. It is supplementary to the Almanach oyal, which concerns only the French administration.

== Examples of information contained in the Almanac ==
Further details concerning the organization of the administration of the French state, and persons who occupied positions, many other topics are discussed in the Almanacs, for example in the eighteenth century:

=== The cost of construction in Paris ===
This section is only found in the Almanacs of the early eighteenth century, and stops just before 1726.

There are prices for masonry, carpentry and joinery, roofing, locksmithing, painting and glazing that are usually in Paris, for example:

"Walls of circular pits, with layers of stone studded with low excess moilon quilted 18 inch thick, 22 pounds fquare fathom, and more in proportion to the depth of the wells, or other difficulties that may encounter."

With these data, the historian is able to quantify fully the construction of a building in Paris at that time.

=== The official ceremonies ===
The Almanac explains in great detail some official ceremonies:

- Opening Ceremony of the Annual Courthouse

"The Entry of Parliament is the day after the S. Martin, 12 November, which day Presidents in red dresses holding their furs & Mortar, & Gowns Gentlemen Consultants red, after attending the solemn Mass that are usually said by a Bishop in the grand hall of the Palace, receive oaths of Lawyers & Counsel. The first president made this day a speech to thank those who celebrated the Mass, which responds to him by another harangue."

- Procession of the University, whose description takes three pages of the Almanac

"The Rector of the University at the end of its Rector, who regularly is only three months, indicating a general procession which assists the whole body. It is a ceremony that deserves to be seen. We will mark the place here What the doctors take the four faculties that comprise the university, all the graduates of these faculties, with the Religious Orders. Procession from the Church of Religious Trinitarians, otherwise known as Maturin. (. . .) The procession is closed by the booksellers, papermakers, bookbinders, Parcherminiers, illuminators, writers swear by the University."

The detailed description of the ceremonies to stop mid-eighteenth century to make room for a still more comprehensive directory. A reference is then made towards the end of the book "guides for all kinds of ceremonies to be observed in the receipt of any office or employment whether in dress or in the Sword."

=== Transportation ===
Transportation of persons is ensured by the coaches, carriages, wagons and other carriages. Found in the Almanac schedules and rates of major roads.

In 1715, a passenger wishing to travel from Paris to Caen would go rue Saint-Denis on Monday at six o'clock in the morning. He has previously "sent his clothes the night before early." Fifteen years later, the starting time is advanced to 5 am in summer and in 1750, the departure is 5 hours throughout the year. In 1780, two flights were scheduled on Tuesdays and Fridays at 23:30, and the journey took two days. A van, slower, except on Sunday at noon and made the trip in four and a half days in summer and five days in winter. In 1790, transportation was provided by the General Department of stagecoaches and the Royal Mail of France. Three coaches liaise on Tuesday, Thursday and Sunday and the van on Sunday. The departure is now Notre-Dame-des-Victoires.

Rates are rarely reported but in 1725 and 1761 it is 18 pounds per person tournaments. He is 21 pounds in 1770 to reach 42 pounds in 1790 (Fortunately for the traveler, it is stated that the "sleeping bag weighing 10 pounds is free.").

=== Company guards of the King Pumps ===
In 1716, the king appoints François Perrier Dumouriez as Director General of public pump to remedy fire, without the audience is obliged to pay anything. In 1722, he founded the Compagnie des Gardes Pumps du Roy, under the direction of the same. This company later became the Brigade of firefighters in Paris.

The Almanac of 1719 lists these pumps and their wardens and deputy wardens. We then learned that a brigade is made up of four guards and four sub-custodians who are responsible for maintaining the material deposited in each district. What became three years later the Society of King's Guards Pumps were not at that time that 41 people, 17 pumps distributed in groups of 8 men and 4 or 3 pumps in the City Hall, the convent of the Grands Augustins The Carmelite convent in the Place Maubert, Convent of Mercy, and the Fathers of Little Place des Victoires, in addition to a pump at the Director General of the pumps, Rue Mazarine. Except Dumouriez guards are not professional fire but shoemakers, carpenters, locksmiths, etc.

== Considerations for bibliophiles ==
=== Availability ===
Almanacs are found regularly in auctions and in the antiquarian booksellers. Given their importance documentary and the fact that there are beautiful copies, these books are particularly sought after by historians, writers, bibliophiles and enthusiasts.

Volumes in the first round of the seventeenth century often exceed several thousand euros, the other is generally negotiated between a few tens and five hundred euros, sometimes more, depending on their rarity, condition and quality bookbinding. Just over half are available for free download on Gallica or Google Books.

=== Notes handwritten readers ===
Almanacs contain some handwritten notes left by their readers. The value of the book can then be influenced upward or downward depending on the quality and content of these notes, and especially the person who wrote them - when you can identify it. They are usually found on page intentionally left blank for the ephemeris. Some of these notes can provide very interesting information, such as notes written on the page in August 1715 a copy of the BNF. It relates the circumstances of the death of Louis XIV, who was suffering from gangrene:

"We thought the death dez Roy Lundy 25. He marched
better a day or two quoyque hopeless. It
died after having suffered much and with great
Patience on Sunday September 1, r t is 8 pm Morning
M r le Duc d'Orleans went to Parl t and was declared
Regent on 2. September e"
