= Nontron =

- Subprefecture and commune
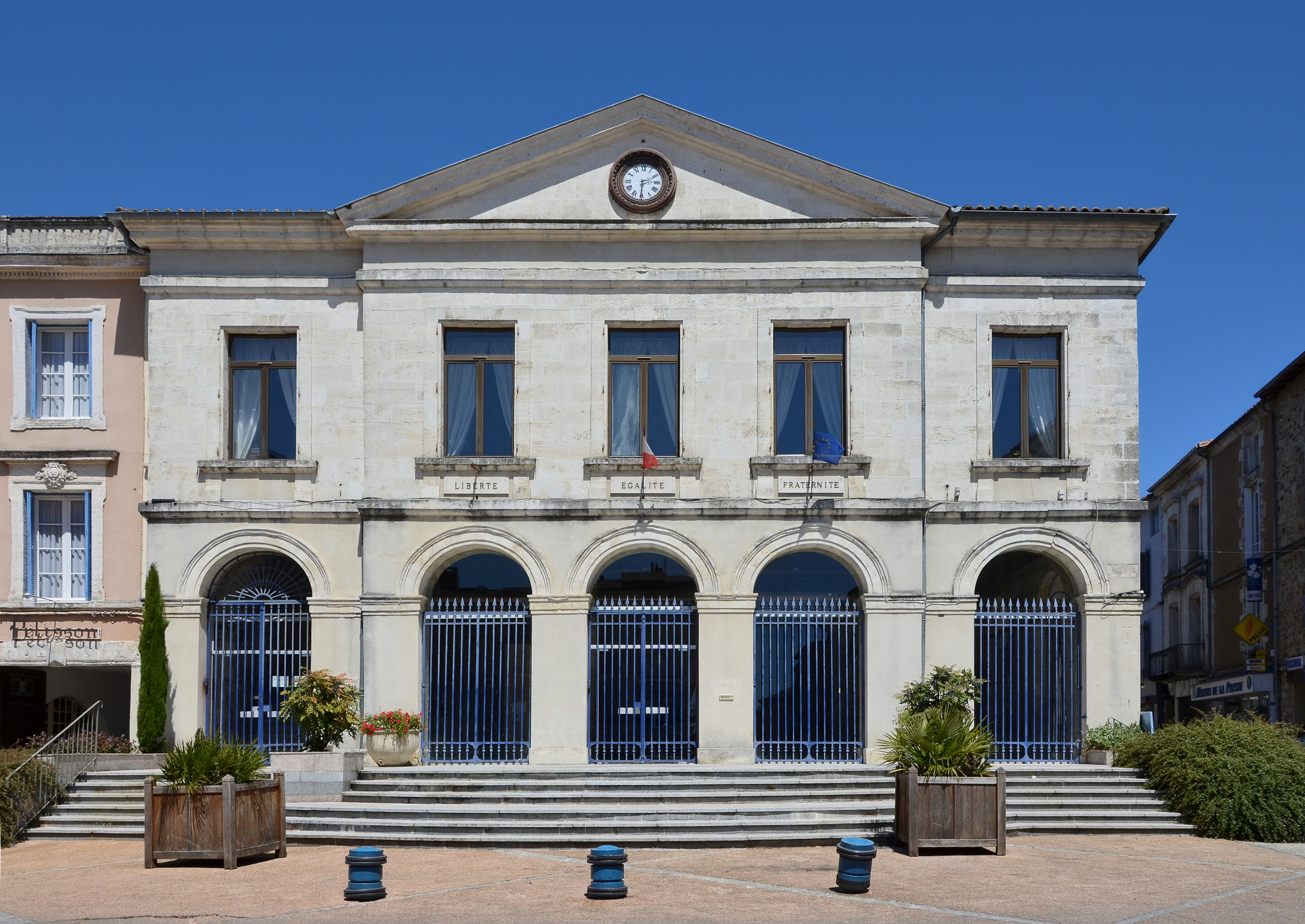
- The town hall in Nontron

- Coat of arms
- Location of Nontron
- Location within France Location within Nouvelle-Aquitaine
- Coordinates: 45°31′46″N 0°39′43″E
- Country: France
- Region: Nouvelle-Aquitaine
- Department: Dordogne
- Arrondissement: Nontron
- Canton: Périgord Vert Nontronnais
- Intercommunality: Périgord Nontronnais

Government
  - Mayor (2020–2026): Nadine Herman-Bancaud
- Area^{1}: 24.67 km^{2} (9.53 sq mi)
- Elevation: 200 m (660 ft)
- Highest elevation: 274 m (899 ft)
- Lowest elevation: 183 m (600 ft)
- Population (2023): 3,057
  - Density: 123.9/km^{2} (320.9/sq mi)
- Time zone: UTC+01:00 (CET)
  - Summer (DST): UTC+02:00 (CEST)
- INSEE/Postal code: 24311 /24300
- ^{1} French Land Register data, which excludes lakes, ponds, glaciers > 1 km^{2} (0.386 sq mi or 247 acres) and river estuaries.

Nontron (French pronunciation: [nɔ̃tʁɔ̃]; Occitan: Nontronh [nunˈtɾuɲ]) is a commune in the Dordogne department in Nouvelle-Aquitaine in southwestern France.

== History ==
The name Nontron probably derives from the Gallo-Roman personal name Nantironius. Over time, the placename has been spelt Natadun, Nattun, Nantrun and Nontroun, before the current Nontron.

The town was probably founded around 1100 BC and has been invaded or sacked several times, including by Saracens in the eighth century. In the Hundred Years' War, Nontron was besieged several times, sitting on the border between the Kingdom of England and the Kingdom of France. In 1800, after the French Revolution, it became a subprefecture of the department of the Dordogne.

The town's railway station served passengers between 1883 and 1940, continuing to handle freight until 1975. The town is known for producing a type of folding knife, known as the Nontron knife.

== Population ==
Historical population

Year	Pop.	±% p.a.
1793	2,356	—
1800	2,809	+2.54%
1806	2,990	+1.05%
1821	2,865	−0.28%
1831	3,246	+1.26%
1836	3,573	+1.94%
1841	3,609	+0.20%
1846	3,692	+0.46%
1851	3,704	+0.06%
1856	3,546	−0.87%
1861	3,581	+0.20%
1866	3,557	−0.13%
1872	3,223	−1.63%
1876	3,427	+1.55%
1881	3,687	+1.47%
1886	4,151	+2.40%
1891	3,585	−2.89%
1896	3,657	+0.40%
1901	3,686	+0.16%

Year	Pop.	±% p.a.
1906	3,426	−1.45%
1911	3,508	+0.47%
1921	3,059	−1.36%
1926	3,112	+0.34%
1931	3,019	−0.60%
1936	2,943	−0.51%
1946	3,204	+0.85%
1954	3,280	+0.29%
1962	3,593	+1.15%
1968	3,792	+0.90%
1975	3,954	+0.60%
1982	3,850	−0.38%
1990	3,558	−0.98%
1999	3,500	−0.18%
2007	3,458	−0.15%
2012	3,212	−1.47%
2017	3,050	−1.03%
2023	3,057	+0.04%

Source: EHESS and INSEE (1968-2023)

== See also ==
- Communes of the Dordogne department
- The Soufflaculs of Nontron
- Nontron knife
