= Nontron knife =

Traditional knife made in France

Nontron logo

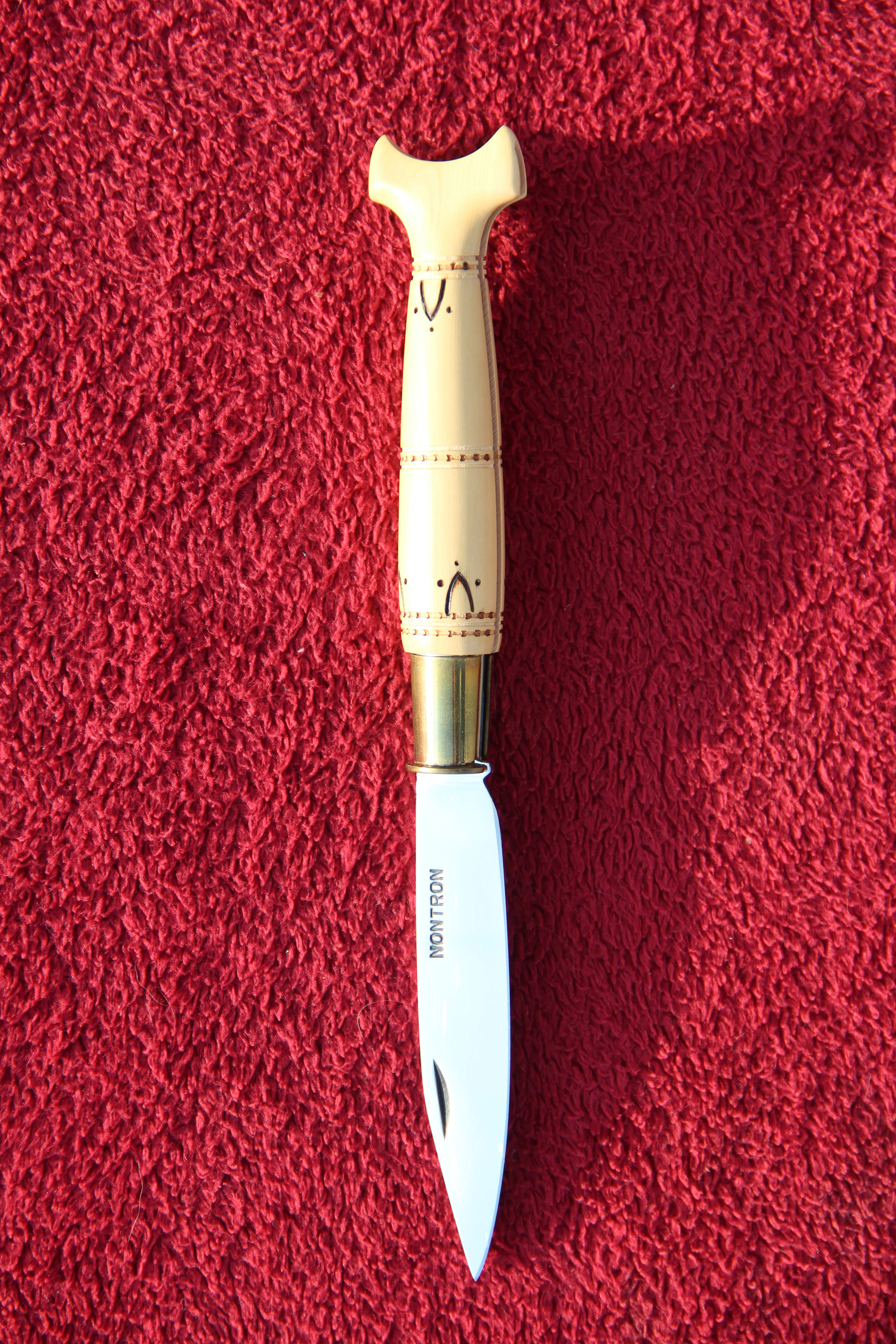
Nontron knife with boxwood handle and brass ferrule.

The Nontron knife is a traditional wooden-handled knife manufactured in the village of Nontron in the Dordogne area of southern France, in a tradition said to date back to the 15th century. The handle is usually of boxwood.

== Overview ==
Nontron knives are decorated with pokerwork designs based on a distinctive logo, and are now highly prized as a style item.

The Nontron penknife is similar in appearance to the cheaper and much more widespread Opinel knife, though the blades and handles are more various in shape.

== Manufacture ==
Nontron also manufacture a variety of table cutlery, chefs knives, and carving knives. Many of these use the traditional boxwood handle but others use more modern materials compatible with dishwashers.

== See also ==
- Pantographic knife
- Ballpoint pen knife
