= Cul-de-lampe (typography) =

Typographic ornament

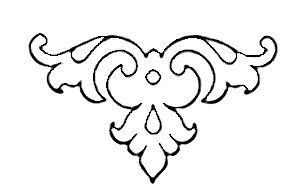
Example of a cul-de-lampe design.

A cul-de-lampe is a typographic ornament, sometimes called a pendant, specifically a tailpiece in the shape of a triangle marking the end of a section of text. It may be a single illustration or assembled from fleurons. Alternatively, it may consist of text where each line becomes progressively shorter. For example, this is a cul-de-lampe ornament made with asterisks:

*****
***
*

Cul-de-lampe is French for 'bottom of the lamp', from the shape of the ornament. The plural is culs-de-lampe.

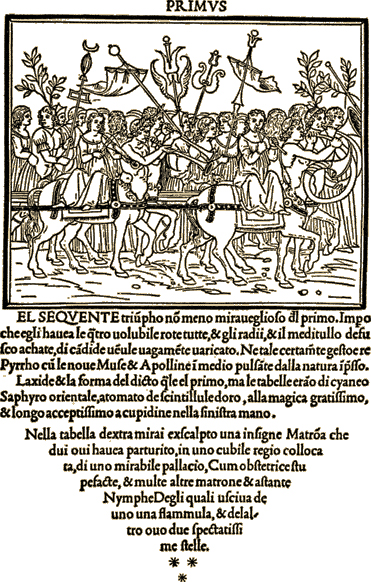
Cul-de-lampe text beneath a woodcut illustration.

== See also ==
- Headpiece (book illustration)
